= Nicolae Crevedia =

Romanian journalist, poet, and novelist (1902–1978)

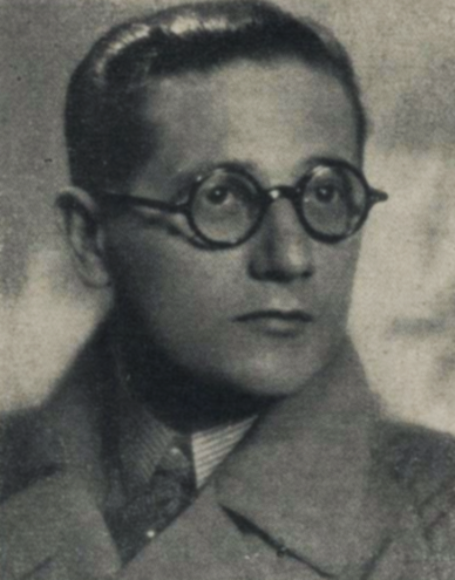
- Crevedia in 1938
- Born: Niculae Ion Cârstea; December 7, 1902; Crevedia Mare, Vlașca County, Kingdom of Romania
- Died: November 5, 1978 (aged 75); Bucharest, Socialist Republic of Romania
- Occupations: Journalist, diplomat, civil servant, translator
- Writing career
- Period: 1924–1977
- Genres: Lyric poetry, free verse, epigram, satire, sketch story, reportage, political novel, autofiction
- Literary movement: Gândirea

Nicolae Crevedia (born Niculae Ion Cârstea; December 7, 1902 – November 5, 1978) was a Romanian journalist, poet and novelist, father of the writer-politician Eugen Barbu. Of Muntenian peasant roots, which shaped his commitment to agrarian and then far-right politics, as well as his dialectal poetry and humorous prose, he preferred bohemian life to an academic career. As a writer at Gândirea, Crevedia became a follower of Nichifor Crainic, and worked with him on various other press venues, from Calendarul to Sfarmă-Piatră. His poetic output and his political outlook were both nominally influenced by his peasant background; in practice, however, he gave literary expression to the suburban environment (or mahala), and adored the modernist poetry of Tudor Arghezi.

Turning to fascism, Crevedia sympathized with the Iron Guard, and, in the late 1930s, contributed to the press campaigns vilifying ideological enemies, while also putting out novels, reportage pieces, and anthologies. His alleged affair with the Iron Guard muse Marta Rădulescu was at the center of a literary scandal, and was fictionalized by Crevedia in one of his novels. Fluent in Bulgarian, he became press attaché in the Kingdom of Bulgaria under the National Legionary State, serving to 1946. He was sidelined by the Romanian communist regime in the late 1940s and early '50s, when he was employed as a minor clerk—though he was largely spared persecution, leading his rival Ion Caraion to suggest that he was an asset of the regime. Alongside his mentor Crainic, he contributed to the propaganda review Glasul Patriei.

Crevedia was more fully recovered under national communism in the 1960s, and lived to see the communist ascendancy of his son Barbu. Various authors see him as partly responsible for the latter phenomenon, alleging that Crevedia had ghostwritten Barbu's debut novel, The Pit. Crevedia's own poetry, much of it heavily indebted to Arghezi, Ion Minulescu and Sergei Yesenin, was reprinted in various installments to 1977. It is regarded by critics as a minor but picturesque contribution to modern Romanian literature. Upon his death at age 75, he was survived by Barbu, who went on to establish the Greater Romania Party, as well as by his daughter Diana Cristev, a literary researcher.

== Biography ==
=== Early life ===
The future writer was born in the eponymous Crevedia Mare, Vlașca County (now Giurgiu County), on December 7 [O.S. November 24] 1907. His parents were the peasants Ion Cârstea and his wife Floarea née Antonescu, described the poet as: "well-to-do people of the plow. I am the first one in my family to have worn a necktie." Crevedia also saw himself as "purely Romanian and from a fully Romanian region", but was rumored to be of Bulgarian ethnicity. His birth name was Niculae (or Nicolae) Ion Cârstea, although he later had it officially changed to N. Crevedia, his pseudonym of choice. His political adversaries at Dreptatea newspaper alleged that his ancestors were Bulgarian greengrocers (zarzavagii), originally called "Cârstoff".

One of two sons born to the Cârsteas, Niculae sponsored his younger brother to complete a high-school-level education, while his older sisters (one of whom had 17 children of her own) remained largely illiterate. After completing primary school in his native village, his own high-school education was interrupted by World War I. Niculae was mobilized as a telephone operator at the mayor's office in Crevedia Mare. He witnessed first-hand the Romanian defeat of November 1916, when Vlașca and all of Muntenia fell to the Central Powers; his father was drafted into the 45th Infantry Regiment, and withdrew with it to Iepurești. With Floarea and his sister Oana, Crevedia traveled there, meeting the caravans of refugees heading for Bucharest, the national capital. As revealed by his private notebooks, Niculae witnessed his father's humiliation by a young platoon leader, as well as his marching into the infantry counterattack of Bălăriile (part of the larger Battle of Bucharest). Upon the end of war, he walked to Bucharest in order to complete his education. In 1923–1924, he was a clerk at the War Ministry, making his published debut in 1924, in the journal Cultul Eroilor Noștri.

Crevedia was a student at Saint Sava High School in Bucharest, where he befriended the younger Simion Stolnicu, who also grew up to be a writer. Stolnicu recalls that his colleague, who wore puttees like most other lower-class students, was an avid reader with a taste for prosody, but never gave clue that he was also an aspiring poet. Crevedia graduated in 1925, and then pursued a degree in Slavic studies at the University of Bucharest. Although he learned Latin and the rudiments of Bulgarian, he never in fact took his degree. He belonged to the sociological research teams led by Dimitrie Gusti and worked for a while as a substitute teacher, then as a private tutor. Notoriously philandering into his old age, Crevedia boasted that his first sexual encounters were war widows. While moving between rented apartments, Crevedia had a sexual relationship with one of his landladies, resulting in the birth of son, the future novelist Eugen Barbu. According to eyewitnesses, father and son resembled each other perfectly. Crevedia recognized him as his own, but preferred to be discreet about his existence. Formally registered as the son of State Railways carpenter Nicolae Barbu, Eugen himself publicly denied his origins, but later admitted to them in private.

Complaining that teaching and studying made him a "misfit", Crevedia took up professional journalism, writing for Curentul, Epoca and Mișcarea; other magazines that ran his work include Rampa, Vremea, and Revista Fundațiilor Regale. In 1928, a Bulgarian newspaper in Balcic hosted two poems by Dimcho Debelyanov, translated into Romanian by Crevedia. The following year, he was contributing to Bilete de Papagal, corresponding with its editors Tudor Arghezi and Felix Aderca from his temporary home in Sâmbăta de Sus (where he shared boarding with writers Cicerone Theodorescu and Ana Luca); he was also preparing an overview of Bulgarian literature, which was supposed to be printed by Adevărul Literar și Artistic. In 1930, Universul's literary supplement hosted his interview with writer Vasile Voiculescu, in which the latter spoke about his mystical experiences. Crevedia's first book, Epigrame ("Epigrams"), was published in 1930, followed in 1933 by poetry collection Bulgări și stele ("Clumps and Stars"). After frequenting the modernist club at Sburătorul, he became one of the most dedicated followers of the poet-theologian Nichifor Crainic, and "one of the most constant" contributors to his magazine, Gândirea.

A journalist colleague, Teodor Al. Munteanu, sees young Crevedia as absorbed by peasant issues, adding: "of course, he jumped in to help without delving any deeper, into the real causalities, but rather for daily concerns, for the bare minimum." Crevedia saw himself as "a man of the right, like my father before me". In his definition, this meant both "ardent" Romanian nationalism and calls for "social justice", with particular emphasis on "the peasant issue": "The [peasantry] is rotten with illness, still ignorant, morally ruined, and political parties have turned it into bedlam." In 1932, he was briefly associated with the leftist newspaper Azi, which began serializing his work of satirical prose, Dragoste cu termen redus ("Short-term Love"). Crevedia withdrew from this enterprise with a public announcement in July. Drifting toward Crainic's neo-traditionalist and Romanian Orthodox far-right, he served as editor-in-chief for the dailies Calendarul and Porunca Vremii. He also published in Cuvântul reportage pieces which documented the effects of the Great Depression on the Bucharest proletariat. As recounted by Munteanu, the young man was unusually sensitive and "ungentlemanly" in his contributions, carrying on disputes in which he "hit below the belt"; in one case, he responded to a literary reviewer at Curentul by drawing attention to his unkempt appearance. He also made a mockery of colleagues such as Maica Smara and Sandu Tudor—the former shamed him publicly, asking him to stop, while the latter published a "Response to All Crevidisms" in his own newspaper, Credința. His milder jibes at another colleague, Păstorel Teodoreanu, almost cost him a public beating.

Crevedia followed up with books of humorous prose: Bacalaureatul lui Puiu ("Puiu's Baccalaureate", 1933) was followed by a complete edition of Dragoste cu termen redus (1934); together with Al. C. Calotescu-Neicu, he published Antologia epigramei românești ("An Anthology of Romanian Epigrams", 1933). Crevedia won the Romanian Writers' Society prize in 1934 and enjoyed commercial success, but was soon after accused of plagiarism by his Calendarul colleague Pan M. Vizirescu and by the epigrammatist Paul I. Papadopol. One of the accusations referred to Crevedia's translation of a Bulgarian poem by Nikolay Rainov, which appeared as such in both Viața Literară and Frize. The piece was later exposed as nearly identical to one of Crevedia's own works; when asked to justify himself, he noted that both poems were his own, and that he had presented one as a translation piece so as to ensure that I. Valerian would publish it. His account was verified by literary historian Mihail Straje, who reports "Rainov" as Crevedia's quasi-pseudonym.

=== Iron Guard sympathizer ===
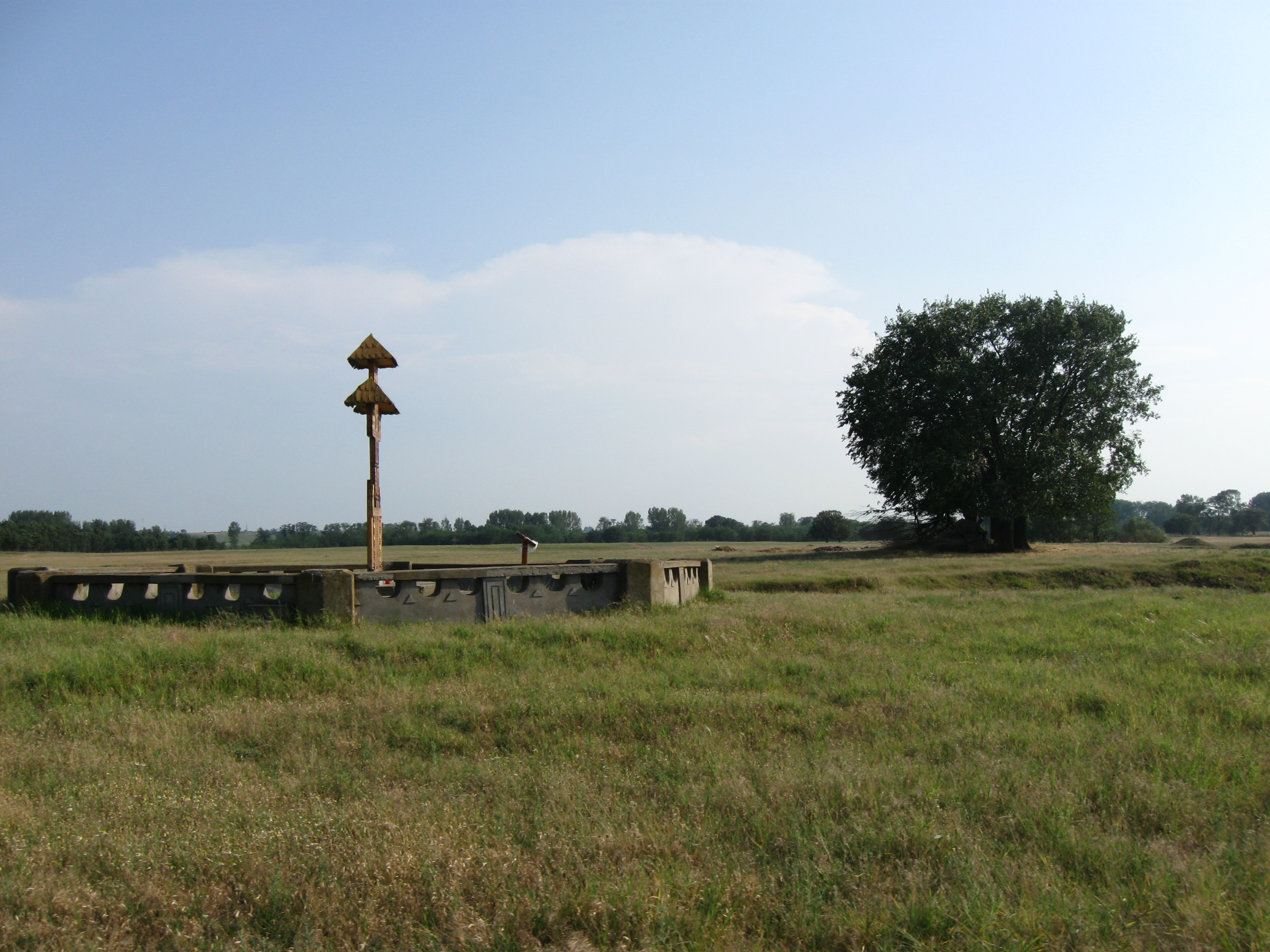
Site of Petrache Lupu's reported miracles, in Maglavit

This period also brought Crevedia and Crainic into contact with the radically antisemitic Iron Guard. In December 1933, Crevedia was one of the intellectuals who protested in Axa magazine against the government's decision to ban the Guard. During 1935, he was present at Maglavit, one of several Guard sympathizers claiming to have witnessed the religious miracles performed by shepherd Petrache Lupu. In Porunca Vremii, he recounted that Lupu had cured his own uncontrollable blinking. According to Munteanu, his "lengthy reportage pieces" about Lupu were overall critical, "generally unmasking priestly involvement in expanding that state of ignorance and confusion". Crevedia also penned panegyrics to the Guard's Captain Corneliu Zelea Codreanu, an "extraordinary organizer" and "profound thinker who reflects on the current issues facing our nation." In his words, Codreanu, an example of "virility, faith, and sacrifice, [had] managed to make us believe that this Nation has not disappeared." He alternated this cult with that of King Carol II and his "Prince Charming" son, Michael I. Nonetheless, Vizirescu accused him of being a disloyal "servant" of Crainic and an inconsistent, corrupt, ally of the Iron Guard. Reportedly, Crevedia complained to his peers that Crainic was exploiting him.

Crevedia had another publicized row with the literary critic and historian George Călinescu—later, he acknowledged Călinescu as a "titan of his generation" and "one of our great prose writers", but still criticized him for "work[ing], year upon year, for the Jews". He also applied his polemical energy to more personal causes, for instance attacking a putative former lover, Marta Rădulescu (daughter of the author Dan "Justus" Rădulescu), with a lampoon piece in Viața Literară. A resident of Cluj, she was locally famous as the editor of Revista Mea, a mouthpiece of the Iron Guard. They had allegedly been due to be married, and Rădulescu even wrote a short novel on the topic, but she eventually rejected him. In such texts, Crevedia accused Marta of having stolen his writings—a claim dismissed by Vizirescu and later also by researcher Ion Chinezu. In some of his notes on the scandal, Crevedia also claimed that Marta's ghostwriter was her father "Justus". Crevedia took his final revenge on Rădulescu by having her satirized in the 1936 novel Buruieni de dragoste ("Love Weeds").

Active in Crainic's proximity, Crevedia had befriended Gândirea novelist Gib Mihăescu, and became a personal witness to Mihăescu's hospital death in 1935. Some two years after the Rădulescu scandal, he married Maria Mutu, in a religious ceremony with Crainic as godfather. Maria was a niece of Mihăescu's, in whose house she lived before marriage; she worked as a professor of French and Romanian. The couple had two daughters, Ioana and Diana. A flight enthusiast, Crevedia continued to travel throughout Europe, and announced by 1937 that he was planning to publish a travelogue of his trips through the Balkans, a theatrical version of Bacalaureatul lui Puiu, and an anthology of Bulgarian poetry, alongside a new novel, Mămăligă—referencing the folk dish. His play was reportedly finished, and Crevedia failed at convincing Camil Petrescu to include it in the National Theater program. Two other volumes of his poetry appeared around that time: Maria (1938), named after his wife, and Dă-mi înapoi grădinile ("Give Me Back My Gardens", 1939).

Still at Porunca Vremii, Crevedia responded to left-wing adversaries of Crainic, primarily the novelist Mihail Sadoveanu, director of Adevărul. During the far-right's anti-Masonic campaign of 1936–1938, he mocked Sadoveanu's obesity and urged him to shoot himself. His invitation to suicide enraged fellow journalist Mircea Damian, who reportedly promised that he would respond in kind, by sending Crevedia a death threat of his own. In early 1937, at the height of the Spanish Civil War, Crevedia contributed to Iron Guard martyrology, depicting Romanian volunteers as "killed for Christ and the Latin race", seeds of "the iron phalanx of tomorrow." However, later that year he and Porunca Vremii had switched their allegiances to the National Christian Party (PNC), which took fourth place in the December elections. On January 1, 1938, Crevedia published an editorial calling for the PNC to take over and inaugurate a "new era" of antisemitic conservatism. In May, he was sent by his newspaper to Ciucea, where PNC leader Octavian Goga was dying from bronchopneumonia; Crevedia is therefore a primary source on Goga's final moments.

As announced by the Iron Guard paper Buna Vestire, Crevedia was involved in the effort to establish "non-Jewified literary circles", and attending one such salon—alongside Șerban Bascovici, Virgil Carianopol, George Dorul Dumitrescu, George Murnu, and Straje. He was supportive of Fascist Italy, and its colonial effort in East Africa. His claim that Italy had "deflowered the filth of Abyssinia" was reproduced by Dreptatea as a sample of unwitting humor. Crevedia soon took distance from the more militaristic aspects of Nazi Germany, expressing alarm that journalists there had become uniformed cadres for the Reich Ministry of Propaganda. Before World War II, he had joined the staff of Gusti's new state-welfare agency, the Social Service. He was mainly contributing to Universul, which was increasingly favorable to fascism. In its literary supplement, he issued calls for a nationalist art, purified of "unhealthy, imported currents".

=== Wartime rise and postwar sidelining ===
With his self-coup and authoritarian constitution, Carol II did away with traditional parties. He then set up the National Renaissance Front, which Crevedia joined in January 1939 (within a mass recruitment of Writers' Society members). As noted by the satirist Neagu Rădulescu, the early 1940s were prosperous times for Crevedia, who had a firm contract with publisher Petre Georgescu-Delafras. At the time, he was keeping the aspiring novelist Constantin Virgil Gheorghiu as his salaried secretary and his țuțăr ("yes-man"), allowing him to wear his old clothes. He thus protected Gheorghiu, who was being maligned by Buna Vestire. Rădulescu notes that, at the Writers' Society, Crevedia acted as a person of importance, but was told off by other writers. As he moved up in his career, the poet built a modern home in his village, which he then donated to his sister. He continued to rely on rented housing, but purchased himself residential land in Băneasa, where, in 1940, he still hoped to build himself a family villa. That year, in March, he agreed to rewrite his play, which finally entered production at the National Theater with Ion Șahighian as the designated director. As the writer himself reports, "events precipitated" after the Invasion of Poland and during the Phony War: theatrical activity was put on hold, and he himself was conscripted for military service.

Under the Iron Guard's National Legionary State regime of late 1940, Crevedia briefly directed Crainic's own fascist newspaper, Sfarmă-Piatră. In mid-1940 the Ion Antonescu government sent him as a press attaché in Sofia. Serving there to 1946, he put together an edition on Romanian culture for Serdika and published Cultura românească și centrul ei: Bucureștii ("Romanian Culture and Its Center: Bucharest", 1943). He also began translating Bulgarian poetry from the original, in the hope of publishing it, and also arranged for "an esteemed Bulgarian colleague", noted elsewhere as Nikolai Liliev, to work on similar translations from the Romanian. No such work ever so print, though Crevedia sent some of his own poems to be published in Convorbiri Literare. As the Iron Guard's managers of theaters, Radu Gyr and Haig Acterian promised him that they would take up the production of Bacalaureatul, but this process was again interrupted in January 1941, when Antonescu ousted and repressed the Guard's leadership. In a February letter to Antonescu's new Director of Theaters, Liviu Rebreanu, he declared that "other than [my having] nationalist ideas [...] which are presently a policy of the state, I never engaged in any sort of politics [emphasis in the original]. And should you need any other referrals, please ask Mr Nichifor Crainic, my spiritual godfather, who, in fact, has also overseen my wedding [...]. I also have the honor of being known to our country's father, General Antonescu."

Following the Guard's downfall, Crevedia approached writer Kristo Kapitanov, who promised to translate two of Rebreanu's novels into Bulgarian. Crevedia himself continued to publish in Universul, including 1941 verses which deplored the cession of Northern Transylvania to Romania's nominal ally, Regency Hungary, and claimed that Greater Romania would emerge again. He made frequent trips back to Bucharest, watching World War II unfold in Romania, and returning with cultural contributions. In November 1941, months after Operation Barbarossa and the reestablishment of Romanian rule in Bessarabia, he was a contributor to Viața Basarabiei of Chișinău—that issue celebrated the new territorial expansions, proposing the full annexation of Transnistria Governorate. In 1943, the same magazine hosted Crevedia's eulogy to his fellow poet and friend, Octav Sargețiu, whom he thus brought to public attention. A report by poet Ion Caraion, who was at the time employed by the official newspaper Timpul, and also networking with the anti-fascist underground, Crevedia was sent in from Bulgaria to negotiate with him and some other of his colleagues, "late in 1943". He recalls not being persuaded by the "radical Naziphile", but also that they had a lengthy conversation on Crevedia's progeny. Caraion alleged that one of Crevedia's sons, whom he tentatively identifies as Eugen Barbu, was a Gendarmerie officer in Transnistria, and as such a Holocaust perpetrator. Barbu himself dismissed reports of his Gendarme status as produced by "some cretin", and noted that, during the period discussed by Caraion, he was in Bucharest, feeding soup to Jewish forced laborers (because, as he put it: "people of the suburbs have not been, and never will be, antisemitic"). According to journalist and period chronicler Dan Ciachir, Caraion's account is "groundless", at least when it comes to Barbu's identification.

Although a fascist, Crevedia was spared during the first purge of the Writers' Society that followed Antonescu's ouster in August 1944. He was reportedly stranded in Bulgaria after the anti-fascist coup of September 9. In October, the reemerging Dreptatea commented on his unwillingness to "return into his motherland", adding: "That man is a press attaché, but here's hoping that the press will no longer be attached to him." In July 1945, the Petru Groza government assessed his case and ruled: "From [Crevedia's] articles in Porunca Vremii one can discern a fully antisemitic campaign with incitement and exhortation of the most violent actions. With his writing he serviced Hitlerism and fascism, popularizing hooligan, anti-democratic, frames of mind. Since Nicolae Crevedia's actively fascist journalism is limited to the year 1939 and given that in later years he stopped putting out such articles, sanction shall be limited to a ban on activities, for no longer than 5 years." Caraion contends that Crevedia never risked more serious persecution, since he was recovered as a "minor dignitary" by the Romanian Communist Party, and also as an informant by its secret police, the Securitate.

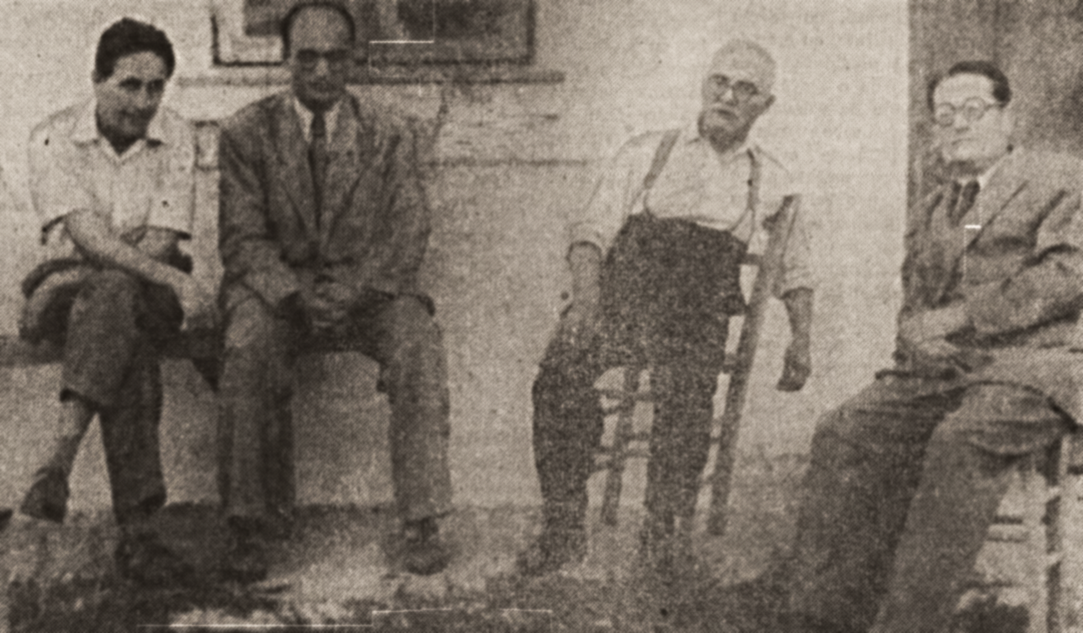
Left to right: Eugen Barbu, Ion Larian Postolache, Tudor Arghezi and Crevedia at Arghezi's Mărțișor mansion in September 1954

Following the establishment of Romanian communist regime in 1948, Crevedia found himself shunned from mainstream literature, and continued to write, secretly, poems which explicitly contradicted the guidelines of socialist realism. He resorted to informal channels, and, with Carianopol, Ion Buzdugan and Radu D. Rosetti, began frequenting the literary parties held at Ion Larian Postolache's home, on Dobroteasa Street, Bucharest. This salon also grouped younger writers, including C. D. Zeletin and Crevedia's own son, Eugen. According to one account, Postolache arranged for Crevedia to meet his son: they had been aware of each other, but never actually met, and Crevedia had heard that Barbu was reduced to poverty. As noted by Ciachir, "the regime was aware that Barbu was the natural son of Nicolae Crevedia (Cristev [sic]), the nationalist writer and newspaperman, a former editor at Porunca Vremii and a godson of Nichifor Crainic's." The notoriety was such that Zaharia Stancu of the Writers' Union "only referred [to Barbu] as 'Crevedia'."

=== Final return ===
Barbu soon became more acceptable to the regime, and published in 1957 his own novel The Pit, part of which fictionalizes Crevedia's youth. According to a persistent rumor, the whole book was actually ghostwritten by his father. The claim is dismissed as unrealistic by Ciachir, who argues that The Pit is well above Crevedia's creative competence. Crevedia himself clerked at the virology institute (1955–1956). Caraion claims that, at about this time, he was being treated at the Parhon Institute for "pre-premature impotence, [and] by doctors whom his bastard son would later besmirch." The story is partly backed by Alexandru Lungu, the endocrinologist and poet. He took Crevedia in his care, after being asked to do so by Crevedia's attending physician, and brother-in-law, I. Popescu-Sibiu. Crevedia became a functionary of the Romanian Academy's linguistics institute in 1956 or 1957. Alongside Gheorghe Bulgăr and other philologists, he worked on a dictionary of Romanian literary biographies. Bulgăr recalls that he was "withdrawn [and] anonymous"; they befriended each other, with Crevedia handing him a selection of his own poetry, in manuscript.

Crevedia was ultimately called on by the regime to edit Glasul Patriei magazine, which he did from 1957 to 1972. As noted by critic Ovid Crohmălniceanu, the enterprise, publishing propaganda aimed at the Romanian diaspora, was set up by former political prisoners Crainic and George Ivașcu, with Securitate agents as supervisors. According to Crohmălniceanu, Crevedia and others, supposed to show the world that freedom of speech existed behind the Iron Curtain, were not in fact "old defenders of democracy", but "had rather filled [with their names] the old fascist press." Following relative liberalization and national communism under Nicolae Ceaușescu, Crevedia returned to the public eye with Luceafărul articles on his meetings with Gib Mihăescu (1965) and Ion Barbu (1966). The latter was panned by Doina Mantu in her review for Amfiteatru. She argued that Crevedia had displayed his "insolence" and "mediocrity", discussing mostly himself (rather than the subject of his article), and making condescending remarks about Barbu's poetic output. In 1966–1967, Argeș magazine featured an epigrammatic duel between Crevedia and Gabriel Țepelea—the latter joked that Crevedia's name was famous, but only "as a village"; Crevedia responded in kind, telling his readers that Țepelea was "a rather famous name, in his own village."

In 1968, Nicolae Manolescu published samples of Crevedia's interwar poetry in his 2-volume anthology. Glasul Patriei's Ivașcu gave the work a lukewarm review, noting in particular that Manolescu's biographical notes were excessive in their "benign elegance"—specifically, Manolescu had omitted any explicit references to many of the poets' far-right convictions, including Crevedia's "foulest activity" at Porunca Vremii. This partial recovery was closely followed by Crevedia's self-selected anthology, Versuri ("Verse"), published that same year. Crevedia was in Craiova in July 1969, attending a literary conference organized by the communist newspaper Înainte. On that occasion, he spoke of the "great victory and reality of the socialist era", namely its ability to instill writers with a "spiritual and social mission." In December, Crevedia, Vizirescu and Carianopol, alongside the Communist-Party envoy Paul Niculescu-Mizil, attended an official banquet marking Crainic's 80th birthday. Reportedly, the same year he was also the first reviewer of Eugen Barbu's other novel, Princepele, which he found to be a masterpiece.

Despite being left-wing and Jewish, Crohmălniceanu discovered that he liked the poetry of both Crainic and Crevedia, and made efforts to have it revisited; as he recounts, these were received with indignation by the communist poet Eugen Jebeleanu, who called Crevedia a "hooligan". Crevedia himself was moved by Crohmălniceanu's work, and the two, later joined by Crainic, had cordial meetings in the early 1970s. Crevedia continued to appear in public, and on March 31, 1970 was billed alongside Neagu Rădulescu at a Sala Dalles event, where they were to discuss the atmosphere of old literary cafés. He visited Covasna in October 1975, reading samples of his own poetry to mark Ștefan Octavian Iosif's centennial. In his final years, he put out the anthology Epigramiști români de ieri și de azi ("Romanian Epigrammatists Past and Present", 1975) and included his previously unpublished verses in Vinul sălbatic ("Wild Wine", 1977).

In 1976, his son made his debut as a poetry critic, tentatively discussing Crevedia as a member of the interwar avant-garde and the postwar neo-modernists—on par with both Sașa Pană and Marin Sorescu; this verdict was received with astonishment by other commentators. Crevedia himself was by then subsidized by the Writers' Union, and, in summer 1976, attended a get-together for interwar writers at Doina Restaurant. He was reunited with novelist Pericle Martinescu, who recalls asking him about his relationship with Barbu; Crevedia reportedly answered that Barbu was a "hump on my back", but "insidiously smiled" when Martinescu told him that his hump was "gilded"—"the father would not disown the son." Crevedia died in Bucharest on November 5, 1978. His burial at Sfînta Vineri Cemetery was scheduled for November 8.

== Work ==
=== Poetry ===
From early on, Crevedia created a reputation as a haughty, blustering countryside poet and as a prose writer inclined toward the licentious; gradually, his lyricism became purer and more temperate, in line with an authentic peasant traditionalism. With Aron Cotruș, Radu Gyr, and other Gândirea poets, he exulted hajduk life, "bursting into explosions of vitality." The Gândirea house critic, Ovidiu Papadima, referred to Crevedia as a traveler on the "imperial road of poetry", emanating "warm and full light"; also affiliated with that neo-traditionalist group, Dragoș Protopopescu argued in 1933 that Crevedia was "the greatest poet of tomorrow"—while noting that such evaluations had raised protest from others in the press, including traditionalist Nicolae Iorga. Crevedia's positioning within the anti-modernist movement remained unclear and contentious: as noted by scholar Dumitru Micu, he is located in the succession of Iorga's own Sămănătorul group, while remaining neatly separated from the ideological core of Gândirea, which was overtly devotional (or "Orthodoxist"). As a voice of the Iconar faction of traditionalists and nationalists, Mircea Streinul argued that Crevedia had understood nothing of "Romanian specificity", his poems being "versified hogwash". Some modernist chroniclers were instead welcoming: Pompiliu Constantinescu thought that Bulgări și stele had a "vigorous poetic strength"; Octav Șuluțiu assessed that Maria was a "profoundly Romanian", "unitary and organic" work of art.

Overall, Șuluțiu regards Crevedia and George Mihail Zamfirescu as authentic voices of mahala regions, expressing an "intermediary reality between village and city"; Crevedia's language in Maria is "picturesque and colored by imperfection and violence". When dealing specifically with the poetic universe of Bucharest suburbia, his lyrical work was infused with influences from Tudor Arghezi, who, Călinescu argues, was a "prototype", particularly with his Mildew Flowers cycle. Nevertheless, the critic points out that the thick Wallachian dialect of Crevedia's prose was only suited for comedic situations and "facile subjects", not "great lyricism". He viewed Crevedia as particularly hampered by his borrowings from the humorous verse of Ion Minulescu and his own "prankish temperament". Crevedia and his friend George Dorul Dumitrescu both regarded Arghezi as "the prince of writers". Also supporting the hypothesis that Crevedia's work was largely shaped by Mildew Flowers, critic Șerban Cioculescu saw additional echoes from Sergei Yesenin, particularly in the "daring crudeness" of their shared vocabulary. This view was toned down by poet Mihai Beniuc, who thought that a direct comparison between the Romanian and Russian poet was exaggerated.

Constantinescu, who notes that Arghezi's influence on Crevedia amounted to a "blessed collaboration", believes that Crevedia's particular note is his "Dionysian delirium", channeling the "will to live". In poems such as "Hunger", the author chose to depict drought and starvation in their minutest detail, an "obsession" which ends up transfiguring nature itself. As seen by Constantinescu, this effort was superior to the hunger-themed poetry of predecessors such as Ștefan Octavian Iosif and Corneliu Moldovanu. Yesenian themes were traced by Cioculescu to poems such as Ceai dansant ("Tea Party"), which displays nostalgia for the countryside:

În pieptu-mi, ca-ntr-o cobză, de-ambiții zdruncinat,
Mai păcăne, căruțe ce-au dus la târg chirie —
Cârlanii-și fac nălucă, dă buzna văcăria
Și duduie în vară mașini de treierat.

Translation:

In my ambitious bosom, the strums of a cobza are meshing,
Here still, taking produce to fairs, the wagon will rattle—
Colts fade out of view to a stampede of cattle
And summer comes in with the whirring of threshing.

The modernist Eugen Lovinescu describes Crevedia as the most accomplished traditionalist, and notes that Bulgări și stele would have been a fully original work had it not been for Mildew Flowers. Crevedia's art was "neither folkloric nor a pastel, neither bucolic nor a fairy tale, and yet a rural poetry, or rather a plebeian poetry [...] of great plastic vigor, its vocabulary cruel to the brink of vulgarity and ugliness, but authentic". According to C. D. Zeletin, Crevedia had a "rural obsession", but actually disliked Romanian folklore; behind the "impression of aggressiveness and primitivism", he was secretly inspired by Arghezi's more cultivated and urbanite literature. Zeletin praised in particular Crevedia's use of alliteration and experiments with poetic language, arguing that they render a "savant charm". Călinescu also noted that Crevedia's poetic homage to his father as a man "seemingly made from stumps and soil", had "a certain xylographic vigor"; Lovinescu likewise sees it as an "admirable woodcut", and Constantinescu as the "most vigorous" work of its cycle. Călinescu identified even "purer vibrations" in stanzas such as:

Apusul și-a-ngropat trandafirii
Toamna își arde ultimele foi —
Ce prelung se sfâșie păunii sângelui.
Noi, foștii locuitori ai lunii,
Coborâm în văi
Astrul iubirii.

Venus e-un munte de tăcere.
Ne-ntoarcem ca dintr-o luptă.
Am văzut, spre ziuă, pe cer,
Sania lumii — ruptă.

Translation:

Sunset has buried its roses,
Autumn burns its last leafs—
How prolonged now the blood-peacocks' torment.
We, former inhabitants of the moon,
Are marching down into the pits
The star of love to descend.

Venus is a mountain of silence.
We return as if from battle.
We saw it in the sky, daylight breaking:
The world-sled, now broken.

=== Prose ===
In a 1991 overview, literary scholar Alexandru George spoke of Crevedia, I. C. Vissarion and Ion Iovescu as an "intermediary generation" of peasant and peasant-focused prose-writers, located halfway between the Sămănătorul group and canon-breaking novels by Marin Preda (as George notes, Preda chose to ignore or discard all such legacy). Crevedia's debut work, Bacalaureatul lui Puiu, is described by Constantinescu as proof that he was "carving his own path." According to reviewer Silviu Bardeș, Crevedia's ten sketches comprised therein had "lively dialogue" and "verve", but alternated between the "remarkable" and the "salacious". The title story was "a fine portrait of today's educated guttersnipes." Crevedia himself argued in 1941 that the work featured "light mockery" against the "old regime" of democracy, aimed "especially at students that are presently obsessed with sport." Protopopescu defended all the samples as landmarks in Romanian humor, arguing that Crevedia had managed to synthesize influences from Ion Creangă, Ion Luca Caragiale, and I. A. Bassarabescu. He acknowledged that the prose fragment Dragoste veche ("Old Fling") could generate scandal with its sexualized content, but still praised Crevedia for managing to accurately depict a young woman's stubborn "sensual ignorance".

Dragoste cu termen redus, a comedic novel, shows the myopic cadet Vasile Țâgăran faking an illness to escape the dullness of military life, only to fall in love with his nurse, Aurora, and finding out that his unrequited affection is much more unbearable. Toward the end of the book, Aurora, having rejected his advances, is shown making passionate love to a street-smart Rom recruit. Reviewer Alexandru Robot panned the volume, surmising that Crevedia "writes violently, without transcending a facile immediacy." As noted by Lovinescu, both Bacalaureatul lui Puiu and Dragoste cu termen redus were complicit to the point of being "vulgar", and overdone: "Comedic situations are exploited mercilessly, persistently, gleefully, amplified and unchecked. For something that Gh. Brăescu will obtain on one page, [Crevedia] uses ten."

The political novel and memoir Buruieni de dragoste depicts Sanda Marinescu, a thinly disguised version of Marta Rădulescu; Revista Mea becomes Revista Revistelor, and "Justus" is Professor Barbu Marinescu, a Freemason. The journalist Trestieru, standing in for Crevedia, slowly discovered that Sanda's political prose is actually the work of her father, and also that the latter has commonplace political opinions, dictated by sociology, democracy, and Fordism. Reviewing the work in 1937, folklorist Iosif Bâtiu argued: "The nationalist youth will easily recognize in the novel's characters, admirably contoured as they are, many pioneers of the nationalist movement, as well as its detractors, the latter viewed in all their spiritual emptiness." This opinion was contrasted by that of Pagini Literare columnist Romulus Demetrescu, who suggested that Crevedia wrote a "lampoon [...] against Marta Rădulescu 's family", "doing away with all discretion and delicacy". He found especially "upsetting" and indecent that Crevedia had disguised other known characters under transparent pseudonyms, suggesting that the author was suffering from megalomania.

Another traditionalist reviewer, Grigore Bugarin, argued that Buruieni de dragoste was written in "masterly Romanian, with unexpected charm. [...] The protagonists come alive. As soon as you close the book, you may close your eyes and hear them speak, watch them gesticulate." The novel, Bugarin claimed, "is a lifelike expression of today's Romanian bourgeoisie." Agreeing with Crevedia's politics, but also with his ideal of the "intellectual woman", Bâtiu concluded: "In this literary era of ours, when so many indecent and pornographic books are shamelessly published by authors of dubious origins, these Love Weeds settle in as a gentle breeze". On the modernist side, Lovinescu also argued that Buruieni de dragoste was Crevedia's most accomplished work. "Poorly structured" and "embarrassing for those familiar with literary life", it was nonetheless more analytical, and had "a poetic note and vigorous expression".

== Legacy ==
The writer was survived by his wife Maria, by his son, and by Barbu's two half-sisters. Maria Crevedia announced in 1983 that she was still holding notebooks of her husband's unpublished prose and poetry; a similar comment had been made in 1982 by Bulgăr, who also held on to Crevedia's self-anthology. Diana Crevedia, married Cristev, worked for the Museum of Romanian Literature and was an editor of Manuscriptum. A translator of works by her more famous half-brother, she later emigrated to Italy. In 2018, she and her sister provided the military magazine România Eroică some fragments from their father's unpublished Mămăligă. Well regarded by the Ceaușescu regime, Barbu remained active at the forefront of Romanian politics and literature through to the 1989 Revolution. A subset of protochronist ideology, his cell of pro-Ceaușescu writers was sometimes known as the "Barbu Group", with Barbu himself co-opted on the Communist Party Central Committee; however, his reputation as an author suffered after revelations of plagiarism, and he was sidelined in the 1970s. As editor of Săptămîna, he cultivated poet Corneliu Vadim Tudor, famous for introducing antisemitic themes to the national-communist discourse. Following the Revolution, Barbu, Tudor and Iosif Constantin Drăgan set up an ultra-nationalist Greater Romania Party.

In his lifetime, Crevedia was a stylistic influence not only on Eugen Barbu, but also on poets such as Ion Mara and Dumitru Gherghinescu-Vania. However, his record in cultural memory remained largely untapped: in 1983, poet Nicolae Stoian had complained that Crevedia, like his younger colleague Mihu Dragomir, had been "relegated into oblivion." In December 1990, Pericle Martinescu depicted him as one of the "utterly wronged" poets, whose works had been "successful at the time of their writing" but were no longer mentioned at all in later scholarship. The early 1990s also witnessed the publications of memoirs by Crevedia's one-time associate Constantin Virgil Gheorghiu, who was living in exile in France. Literary critic Cornel Ungureanu argues that these texts greatly overstated Crevedia's cultural importance, elevating him from the "picturesque underground" to which both he and Gheorghiu naturally belonged.
