= Marta Rădulescu =

Romanian poet, journalist, and novelist (1912–1959)

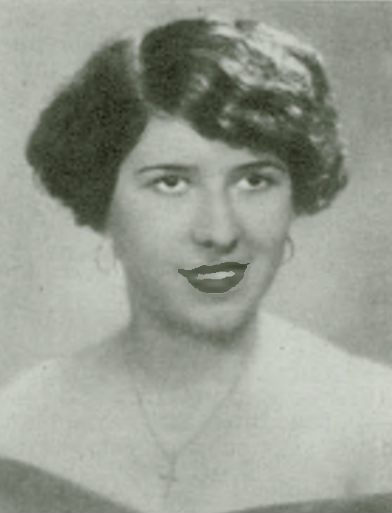
- Born: April 24, 1912; Pitești, Kingdom of Romania
- Died: September 5, 1959 (aged 47)
- Occupations: Journalist, political militant, photographer
- Writing career
- Period: 1922–1940
- Genres: Autofiction, lyric poetry, satire, sketch story, prose poetry, young adult literature, fairy tale, reportage, travelogue, political novel, historical novel

Marta D. Rădulescu or Rădulescu-Moga (April 24, 1912 – September 5, 1959) was a Romanian poet, journalist, and novelist, made famous in the 1930s for her autofictional work. From an academic family with a penchant for radical politics, she veered into fascist politics, supporting the Iron Guard. The commitment shaped part of her literary output. From a satirical rendition of education in the provinces, with borrowings from Ionel Teodoreanu, it veered into a document of interwar radicalization and student political battles. Scandal followed the publication of her early prose works, particularly after claims that they had been largely or entirely written by her father—or, alternatively, by her friend and putative lover Nicolae Crevedia. Her polemic with Crevedia was consumed in the national press and in books written by both participants.

Rădulescu's family moved away from an initial commitment to left-wing politics, joining the far-right of Romanian nationalism. This transition ended up straining relations between Marta and her Jewish publishers at Adevărul. She became a believer in antisemitic conspiracy theories, airing these through the magazine Revista Mea, which she put out as an Iron Guard satellite between 1935 and 1937. By then, however, her sincerity and political literacy had been put into question by Crevedia. She faded into obscurity by 1940, when she issued her last novel, the first installment of an uncompleted cycle. Her other published works include modern fairy tales and a travelogue of her hiking trips.

== Biography ==
=== Debut ===
Born in Pitești, Marta noted that she had Transylvanian roots, despite being formally from the "Old Kingdom". She was the daughter of chemist Dan Rădulescu who, in the 1930s, worked as a professor at the University of Cluj. Under the pseudonym Justus, he also penned literary works. Marta's brother, Fluor, followed the same career path as their father, and ended up teaching alongside him. It was also in Cluj that Rădulescu completed her secondary education, at Regina Maria High School; she had earlier been homeschooled by her mother. According to her own recollections, her first poem was an "invective" directed at sandals her father had bought for her—Marta was frustrated that other children had fancier footwear, while her family shunned luxuries. A "literary friend" read the poem, and encouraged her to send her attempts for publication in Dimineața Copiilor magazine (a supplement of Dimineața daily). Though not published immediately, she was urged by editor Nicolae Constantin Batzaria to continue with perfecting her style. Her first published work, the poem Vorbind cu luna ("Talking to the Moon"), appeared in Dimineața Copiilor in 1929.

Rădulescu was already writing down prose, but was apprehensive about sending it to be published in magazine. As she explained, she was reading in Adevărul Literar și Artistic scathing reviews of other aspiring novelists, penned by Mihail Sevastos. Her mind was then made up to only publish "all in one go, as a volume." As recalled in 1988 by Horia Stanca, Marta entered Cluj's literary scene in 1930, when, chaperoned by her father, she attended literary parties hosted by physician Victor Papilian. It was here that she read from her sketches—published in 1931 as the volume Clasa VII A ("Grade 7th A"). According to critic Pavel Dan, it was "not a good book", but "promising"; another reviewer, Perpessicius, viewed her as noting "with humor, a humor often filtered through venom, a crooked and obsessive world, that of schoolmarms". He also argued that Rădulescu was heavily indebted to the young adult literature put out by Ionel Teodoreanu.

The stories were also at the center of a scandal involving both the young writer and her father. Since they made no effort to disguise facts from life, and satirized living people using their real names, critics readily claimed that her father had ghostwritten them: during the late 1920s, as a contributor to Cuvântul, Dan Rădulescu had campaigned for reform in public education. Some found the work to be a distasteful act of revenge. Responding to such claims in Societatea de Mâine, Ion Clopoțel argued that Clasa VII A was rather a call for "betterment", "a protest against the lackadaisical nature of some classes being taught, and against some purposefully disengaged attitudes." Marta herself noted that she had been disgusted by her time in high school—though she had loved most areas of study, she could not bear the "dogmatic" way of teaching them. Clasa VII A was her "liberation from a nightmare." The modernist doyen Eugen Lovinescu noted the work for its "irreverent rebelliousness" which "gave harmless satisfaction to an entire generation of youth oppressed by their schooling."

Rădulescu's first publishing contract was with Scrisul Românesc of Craiova, a company that, in her own definition, was not one of national relevance, making it "sheer luck [that] I enjoyed such success as other debuting authors never had." Clasa VII A became a best-seller, going through three successive editions. By 1934, she boasted 100,000 lei in revenue, noting that this was above the sums earned by other, more senior writers. The volume was followed the same year by Mărgele de măceș ("Dog-rose Beads")—vacation stories and verses which critics have deemed mediocre. One exception was Perpessicius, who found the volume to be "mature", "diverse", and emancipated from Teodoreanu's influence—instead, he noted echoes from the earlier romantics, and in particular from Alexandru Odobescu's hunting stories. Marta also persevered as a poet: in addition to ending her Mărgele de măceș with rhyming verse (which won Perpessicius' praise), she published other lyrical pieces in Societatea de Mâine and Hyperion.

=== Sunt studentă! ===
By late 1932, Rădulescu was in correspondence with Nicolae Crevedia, an admirer and like-minded humorist-writer, who visited her at her second home in Pitești. Crevedia may have also acted as her literary agent, arranging the text for print, and instructing her on how to polish her style. Reportedly, Rădulescu was taking courses at the literature and philosophy faculties of the University of Bucharest, but did not graduate. One of her interviewers, Alexandru Robot, claims that the university "expelled her, as a subversive element." Living with her father in a large townhouse outside Cluj's Botanical Garden, she began writing her self-styled "fantasy reportage pieces", collectively grouped as Sunt studentă! ("I Am a Student!"). Mysteriously, this work was a fresco of her father's Cluj University, which Rădulescu may not have attended at all, to the backdrop of the Great Depression and political convulsions. Such details renewed speculation that Marta was signing works penned by Dan Rădulescu. The latter's colleagues are disguised under various names, but, as noted at the time by critic Pompiliu Constantinescu, not very well, with philologist Gheorghe Bogdan-Duică easily recognizable by any reader. The student-narrator takes part in the strike of 1932, where she meets recruiters for both the Romanian Communist Party and the fascist Iron Guard (including a glimpse of the agitator Bănică Dobre). The autofictional Rădulescu informs the reader that she prefers the Guard, but attends meetings of the far-left, during which communist activists imply that the difference between them and the fascists is a minor one.

Constantinescu was critical of the book's unmitigated observation, noting that her "precious lucidity" fell short of an artistic effort, and that her usage of similes in her descriptions drew attention away from her lively dialogues. He also noted some fragments of poetic prose, using models "involuntarily stolen" from Teodoreanu, but also from Tudor Arghezi, Emil Gârleanu, and Mihail Sadoveanu. According to Pavel Dan, all of Sunt studentă!'s pieces are too self-referential, even "surfeited": "[She] writes about the fact that she is now an author. Of course, this fact unsettles the entire universe. [...] Humanity itself breaks in half: on the one hand, those who appreciate her talent [...] and, on the other, those who know-nothings, such as university professors". A similar verdict was provided by Lovinescu: "the writer explored the situations facing her tiny personality in two more novels [...], which failed to make her interesting anew; the genre is too much for her to handle". The book was well received by the reading public at large, and generated a "tiny local storm" in Cluj, where Rădulescu had become universally recognized. In a 1933 piece, she thanked her new publishers, the "great company" Editura Adevărul of Bucharest, for ensuring the "combative success of my funny little book." By 1935, it had had four consecutive editions.

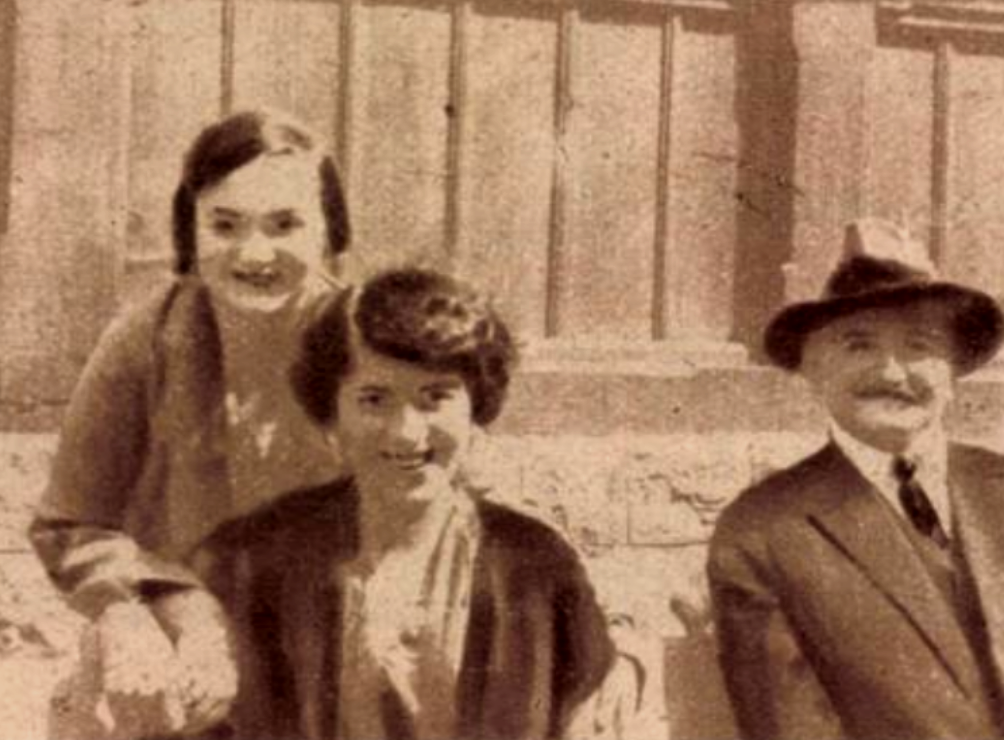
From left: Kuki de Herz, Rădulescu, and Major Gheuca (organizer of the Romanian writers' retreat) in Bușteni, August 1933

Mostly enthusiastic about her new prose, Crevedia took Marta with him to Bucharest. Inducted into the Romanian Writers' Society, she visited the Royal Foundations, meeting Arghezi, Panait Istrati, George Dorul Dumitrescu, and King Carol II. She told Robot that this visit had made her feel as if a "tiny morsel from a real greater whole", like "soldiers in their file." Crevedia also introduced her to Lovinescu's literary society, Sburătorul, where he read from her drafts. An excerpt of Sunt studentă! was published by Societatea de Mâine in January 1933.

The book finally came out later that year, again at Editura Adevărul. The same press holding published the lifestyle magazine Realitatea Ilustrată, where Marta was also introduced. In summer 1933, she hiked and climbed through the Bucegi Mountains, or, as she called them, "Little Tibet". Her reportage, illustrated with her landscape photography, saw print in Realitatea Ilustrată. In August, she was at the Writers' Society hotel in Bușteni, vacationing alongside dramatist A. de Herz and his actress daughter Alexandra "Kuki", whom she befriended. Rădulescu was passionate about sports: in addition to hiking, she enjoyed competitive dance, biking, skiing, and horse-riding; by 1933, her only visit abroad was to what she called "non-Hitlerian Germany".

=== Conflict with Crevedia ===
In July 1933, Rădulescu informed her readers that she was seeing someone romantically, and that she believed in marriage as a fulfillment of her status as a woman—though she also jokingly commented that her ideal man would have been an Orthodox bishop. Sunt studentă! was followed in 1934 by an autobiographical novel, Să ne logodim! ("Let's Get Engaged!"), which was taken up by Cartea Românească publishers. Literary scholar Dan Smântânescu discovered her as a "talent of quick observation" and a "novelist in a sense that is completely unlike all of what we have learned to appreciate in modern epic complexities." Her depiction of sentimental transactions was authentic, in that it showed an engagement being determined "not by residual morality, but by the imperatives of present-day life." While working on translating works by Bjørnstjerne Bjørnson and a draft of a large novel called Cadavre ("Carcasses"), she published a children's volume. It was called Cartea celor 7 basme ("The Book of 7 Fairy Tales"), and was written in a pretentiously poetic style. Rădulescu's work also appeared in Gândirea, Viața Literară, and Ideea Literară.

By then, the Rădulescus' relationship with the fascist Iron Guard was becoming ambiguous, then notoriously close. From initially liberal positions, which criticized the antisemitic excesses and vandalism of the Guardists, Dan slowly moved toward ideas which the authorities deemed "communistic", and then became a putative follower of the Guard. In the December 1933 elections, he shocked Cluj's intelligentsia, who still knew him as a "left-wing theoretician", by presenting himself as a Guardist candidate. That same month, despite protests from the faculty, the government of Ion G. Duca arrested him for his involvement with an outlawed subversive movement. At the time, prosecutor Nicolae Birăescu alleged that documents implicating Rădulescu Sr in terrorist activities had been found in a Guardist safe-house.

Soon after, the literary relationship between Crevedia and his protégée ended, with the two alleged former lovers becoming enemies. What followed was, according to Crevedia himself, an "embarrassing amorous polemic". In articles he published on the subject, he publicly suggested that himself or someone else had been the author of Rădulescu's various works. In July 1934, the regional magazine Viața Ardealului noted: "The case of Marta D. Rădulescu grips public opinion just like a novel or a change of government would"; her name, journalist Sever Stoica argued therein, "is almost as well-known as that of a Hollywood star." Reportedly, Crevedia was upset that Marta had dissolved their engagement, and wished to take revenge. He believed that Să ne logodim! was a book about their relationship.

For her part, Marta claimed that the story of their engagement was a fabrication, and that the only words attesting her affection for him were plainly sarcastic. As evidence of this and other details, published Crevedia's letters to her in the same Viața Ardealului; on this basis, she threatened to sue him. The fragments were covered by Dreptatea daily, which noted that they evidenced her poor grasp of Romanian orthography, but also that Crevedia had embarrassed himself—since he had been the first person to promote "idolatry" of Marta; the controversy was summarized therein as țigănie ("quarrel among Gypsies"). As Stoica noted, Crevedia had only succeeded in making Marta more beloved by the public. Stoica also rejected Crevedia's allegations about Marta's plagiarism, noting that he had made no effort to substantiate them. A similar claim was stated by poet Mihai Beniuc: "Could it be that Miss Marta's books are so extraordinary that they were necessarily written by someone else?" Reportedly, writer Mircea Damian confronted Crevedia at a Bucharest coffeehouse and "administered [him] a scathing public lesson in morality." The claim of plagiarism from Crevedia was dismissed by his colleague Pan M. Vizirescu (who moreover claimed that Crevedia himself was a plagiarist), and then also by the literary researcher Ion Chinezu.

=== Revista Mea and later years ===
From January 1935 to 1937, Marta again took up the Iron Guard cause publicly, putting out Revista Mea ("My Own Magazine") as a regional mouthpiece of the movement—with Fluor as a co-editor and with contributions from Guard affiliates such as Traian Brăileanu, Emil Cioran, and Ion Moța. The latter two called for a rejuvenated Romanian literature, emancipated from "the Jewish shackles", and stripped of "kike commercialism". His convictions largely defined by his children's affiliations, Dan Rădulescu was also part of the Revista Mea staff. His articles there clarified that he now viewed communism as "suicide", and the far-right as a guarantee of "[our] independent ancestral faith and ethnic countenance". His overall conclusion was that: "The right's spirituality will win against communism's destructive materialism." Fascist activists Mihail Polihroniade, Alexandru Constant, and Ioan Victor Vojen were also featured, with pieces which attacked liberal democracy, supporting "organicism" and antisemitism. Another publication of the Guard, Cuvântul Argeșului, noted in May 1936: "Professor Rădulescu's family will be absolved in heaven of all its earthly sins, for it has surrendered itself to sacrifice, entirely and for its entirety."

The review published some 5,000 copies per issue, with more pages and higher quality print as time passed. Although she advertised it as an independent publication for "honest reviews", and maintained that she was not personally antisemitic, Revista Mea promoted the far-right ideology from its first issue. In that print's editorial, Rădulescu alleged that a Jewish conspiracy at Editura Adevărul was preventing her from publishing, because of her father's politics. In that context, she also claimed that Jewish booksellers had refused to advertise Mărgele de măceș with its brief retelling of Romanian folklore, since it contained references to Uriași antagonists called Jidovi ("Jews"); she also reported that fragments of Sunt studentă!, detailing antisemitic chants as heard directly from the Guardists, had been unexplainably removed from the printed edition. In her retorts, she demanded the creation of a "nationalist Romanian literature" to counter the influence of "Jewish nationalism" (which she otherwise rated as a "quite explainable and respectable" phenomenon). Fellow writer Mircea Eliade partly credited her claims, noting that Jewish bookstores had boycotted a nationalist book by Teodoreanu, as well as a controversial essay by the Jewish intellectual Mihail Sebastian. He warned: "Once politics get into literature, those who will end up suffering the consequences are the Jews and the writers."

Himself sympathetic toward the Guard, Crevedia published his own account of the affair in the 1936 novel Buruieni de dragoste ("Love Weeds"), with himself as the protagonist Trestieru and Marta as Sanda Marinescu; Fluor is disguised as the agronomist Grâu Marinescu. This work cemented earlier allegations against Dan Rădulescu (including that he had penned his daughters' work), but added that he was ideologically unreliable. Appearing as Professor Barbu Marinescu, he is a democratic-minded, "bookish" Freemason, obsessed with sociology and Fordism. In love with Sanda, whom he believes to be his ideal "intellectual woman", Trestieru is disappointed by her plagiarism and her overall mediocrity. Praised by nationalists as an attack on the "spiritual emptiness" of the Guard's "detractors", or as a "lifelike expression of today's Romanian bourgeoisie", Buruieni de dragoste was panned by reviewer Romulus Demetrescu. A former schoolteacher whose students had included Fluor Rădulescu, he described Crevedia's book as a megalomaniac's lampoon, "doing away with all discretion and delicacy". Lovinescu sees Crevedia's book as accomplished, but "embarrassing".

Also in 1936, Fluor himself became a published novelist, with a psychological novel of his adolescence, called Descătușare ("Unchaining")—the first part of an incomplete cycle. Also that year, all three Rădulescus, including Marta, who had married into a Moga family and used the new name of "Marta D. Rădulescu-Moga", celebrated the right-wing daily Universul for its offensive against the "Jewish communism" at Adevărul. In June 1937, the Guard's main daily, Buna Vestire, reported that Revista Mea had not appeared for a long time, adding: "Marta Rădulescu needs to make up her mind, and Revista Mea needs to reappear. Our comrades await it." That same month, another Cluj magazine, called România Eroică, hosted fragments of Marta's historical novel, Frații de cruce ("Blood Brothers" or "Brothers of the Cross"). Her final work was another novel, Streina ("The Foreigner"), which came out in 1940. This too was the first part of a planned cycle, called Ferentarii, that she did not complete. Their father, meanwhile, reasserted his faith in the Guard by contributing, during the December 1937 election, to a collective homage in Buna Vestire.

According to historian Dragoș Sdrobiș, the first stages of World War II should have been a time of political prominence for the family, with the Iron Guard having set up its totalitarian government, the National Legionary State. However, this was not the case, and "historical silence fell" over all three Rădulescus. In October 1944, shortly after the anti-Nazi coup and the Communist Party's legalization, the latter's official organ, Scînteia, demanded that Rădulescu be "purged" out of the Writers' Society—along with scores of other Guardist or more generically nationalist affiliates. Surviving the establishment of a Romanian communist regime, Marta died on September 5, 1959, aged 47; her father outlived her by ten years, dying on November 14, 1969, when Fluor was still alive.

== Legacy ==
Rădulescu's works were again being panned by authors of the communist period: in 1954, pedagogue Alexandru Sen argued that Clasa VII A plunged readers into a "strange world, peopled by maniacs," unwittingly showing "the decomposition of that bourgeois society which schools of that day were so duly serving." In a 1965 piece, critic Mircea Tomuș referred to her as "rightfully forgotten", only using her work for comparison with a "bourgeois curtain-raiser" by Sidonia Drăgușanu. In 1997, a publication called Revista Mea was being put out by the Romanian Jewish community of Tel Aviv, its editors unaware (until a reader informed them) that this title had an antisemitic pedigree.
