= Ceptura =

- Commune
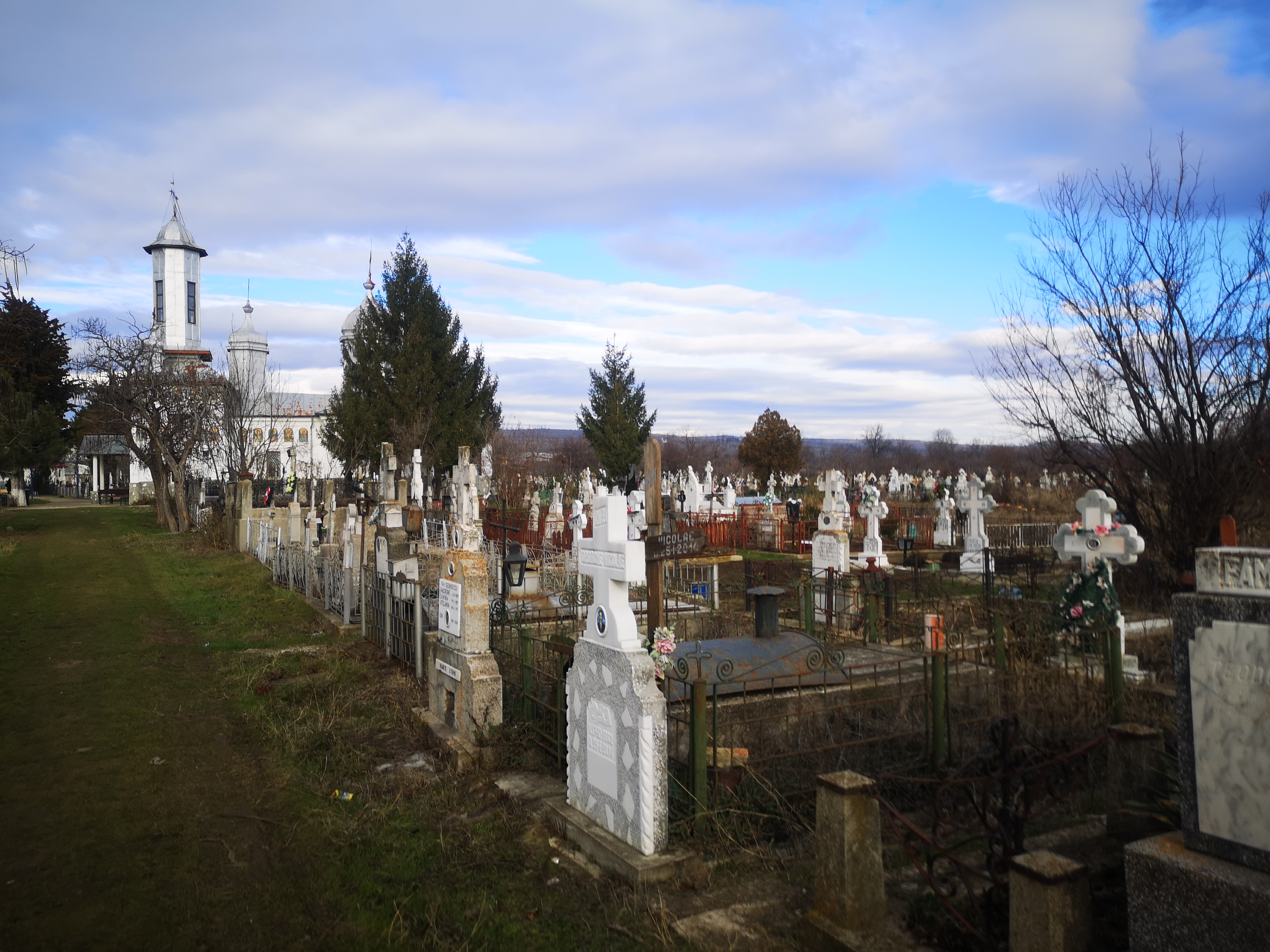
- Holy Trinity Church in Ceptura de Jos

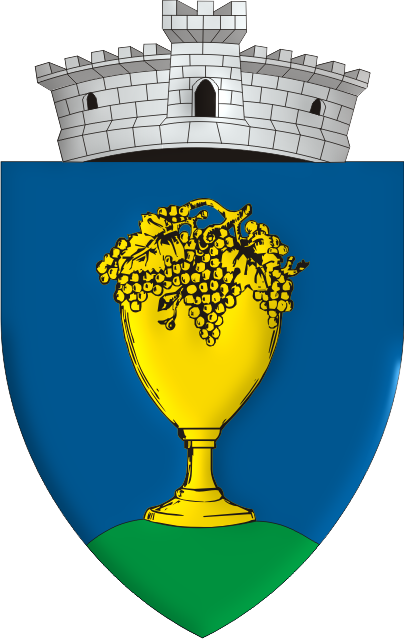
- Coat of arms

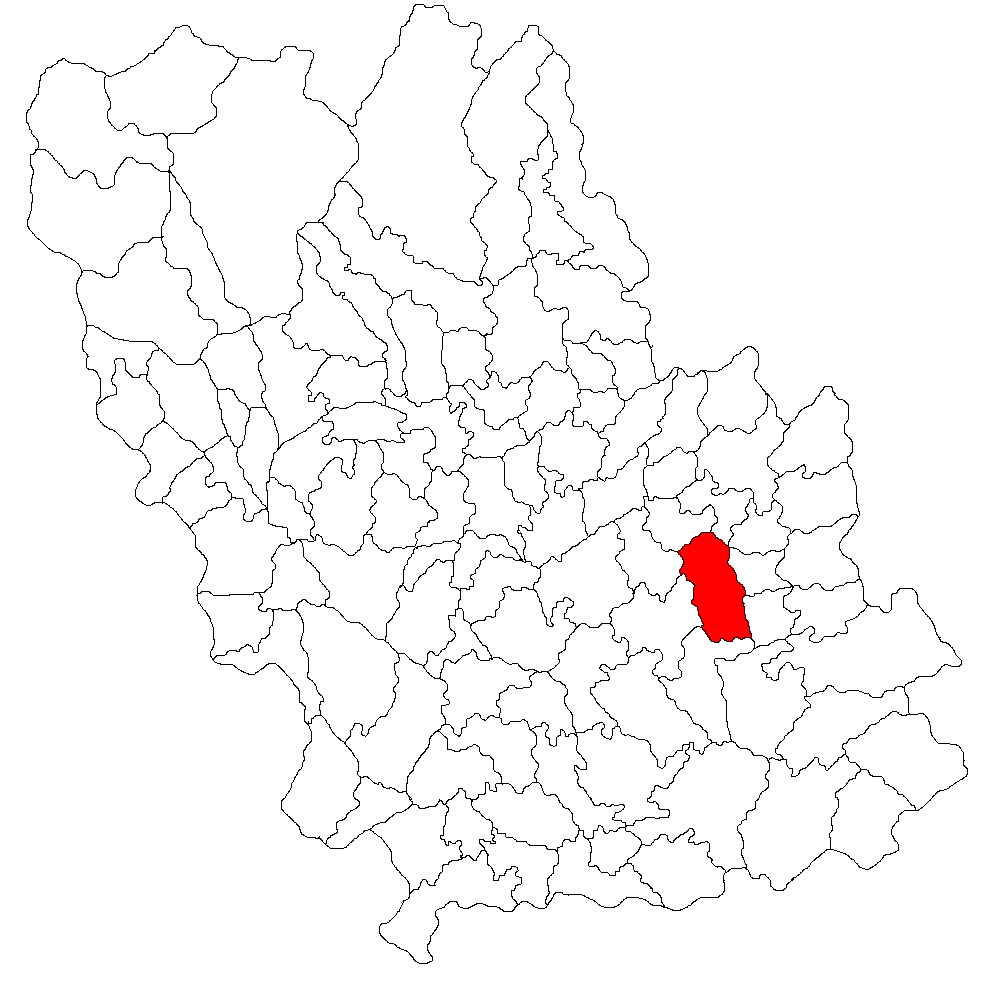
- Location in Prahova County

- Location in Romania
- Coordinates: 45°01′N 26°20′E
- Country: Romania
- County: Prahova

Government
  - Mayor (2024–2028): Vasile George Stanciu (PSD)
- Area: 47.05 km^{2} (18.17 sq mi)
- Elevation: 170 m (560 ft)
- Population (2021-12-01): 4,019
  - Density: 85.42/km^{2} (221.2/sq mi)
- Time zone: UTC+02:00 (EET)
  - Summer (DST): UTC+03:00 (EEST)
- Postal code: 107125
- Area code: +(40) 244
- Vehicle reg.: PH
- Website: comunaceptura.ro

Ceptura is a commune in Prahova County, Muntenia, Romania. It is composed of five villages: Ceptura de Jos (the commune centre), Ceptura de Sus, Malu Roșu, Rotari, and Șoimești.

The open-pit Ceptura Coal Mine (opened in 1954) is located in Ceptura de Sus.

Historical population
Year	Pop.	±%
1992	5,473	—
2002	5,304	−3.1%
2011	4,717	−11.1%
2021	4,019	−14.8%
Source: Census data

== Notable people ==
- George Dorul Dumitrescu (1901 or 1904–1985), prose writer and columnist
- Georgeta Militaru-Mașca (born 1954), rower
