= Maglavit =

- Commune
- Location in Romania
- Coordinates: 44°2′N 23°6′E
- Country: Romania
- County: Dolj
- Population (2021-12-01): 3,938
- Time zone: UTC+02:00 (EET)
  - Summer (DST): UTC+03:00 (EEST)
- Vehicle reg.: DJ

Maglavit is a commune in Dolj County, Oltenia, Romania. It is composed of two villages, Hunia and Maglavit.

== History ==
Research carried out on the banks of the Danube in which Maglavit is situated on, proves that the area has been inhabited since at least 1500 B.C. It has been mentioned in documents of the 14th century, by the name of Toporna. In mid-1935, local Romanian Orthodox shepherd Petrache Lupu claimed to have seen and spoken with God. Over the following three years, some two million pilgrims came to Maglavit, 10 million lei in donations were raised and King Carol II ordered the construction of a church on the site of the reported miracle. However, interest in the story had withered by autumn 1938, the church remained largely unbuilt and the funds were embezzled. The episode was exploited by the far-right: Iron Guard supporter Nichifor Crainic eulogized Lupu, while his Sfarmă-Piatră was still mentioning him in April 1941. Meanwhile, in 1935, Iron Guard sympathizer N. Crevedia claimed Lupu had cured him of uncontrollable blinking.

== Gallery ==
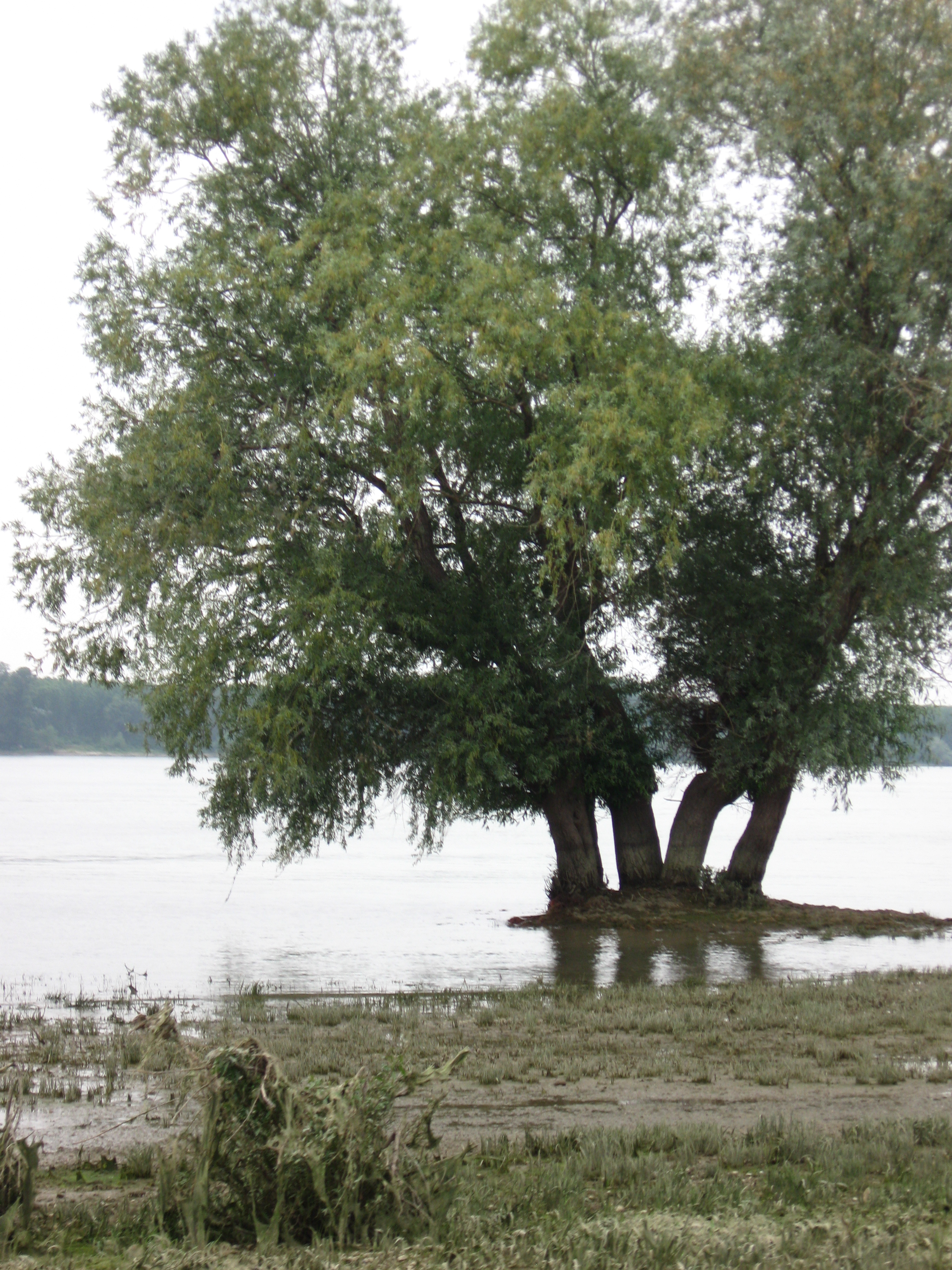
Marsh on the Danube

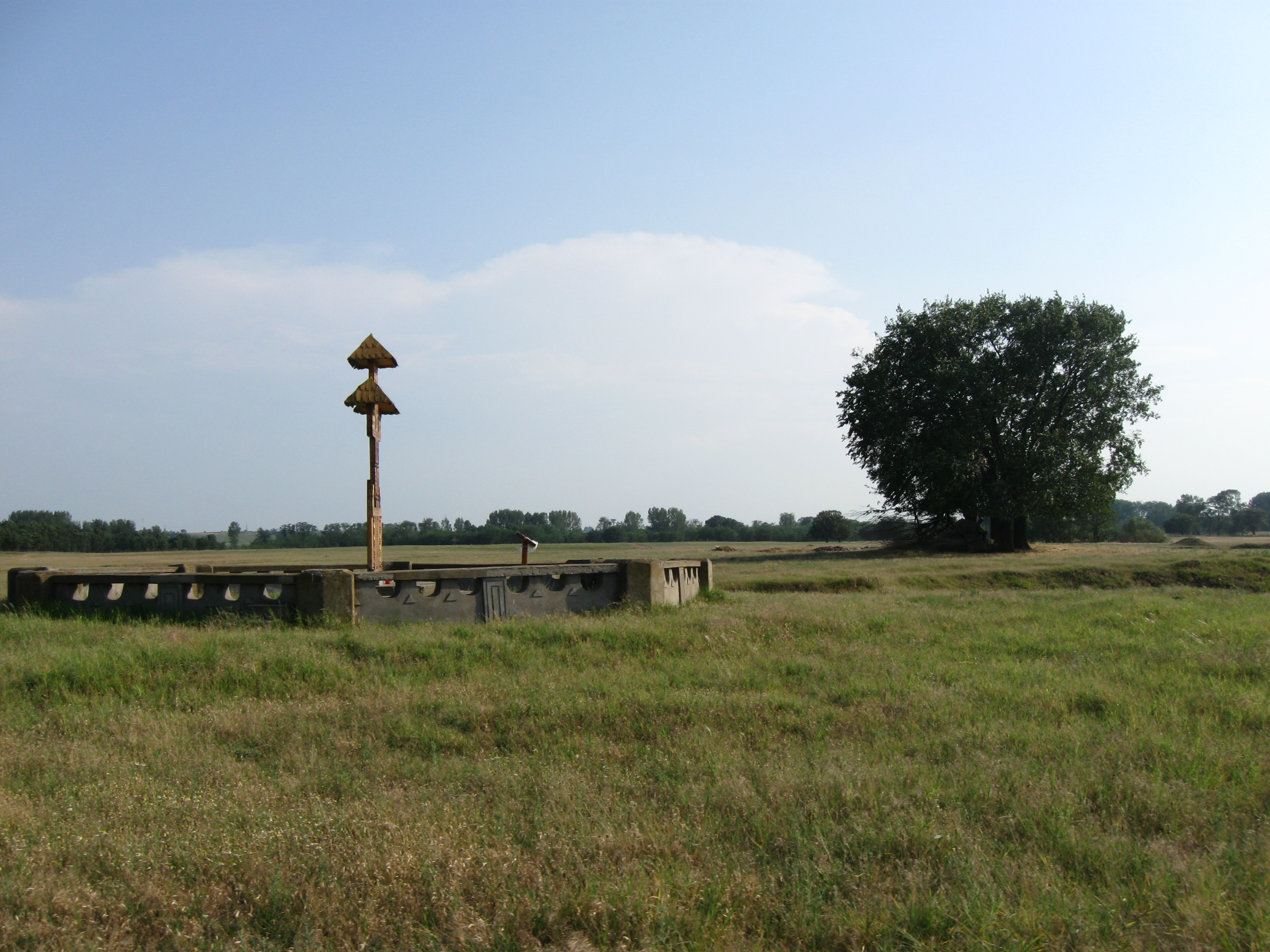
Site of Lupu's reported miracle

== See also ==
- Maglavit Monastery
