= Relations between the Romanian Orthodox Church and the Iron Guard =

Interactions between the Romanian Orthodox Church and the Iron Guard

The relationship between the Romanian Orthodox Church and the Iron Guard was one of ambivalence. The Romanian Orthodox Church promoted its own version of nationalism which highlighted the role of Orthodoxy in preserving the Romanian identity. Starting with the 1920s, the Church became entangled with fascist politics and antisemitism. In this context, the Iron Guard, also known as the Legion of the Archangel Michael, a fascist movement founded in 1927, became very influential with church grassroots. Numerous rank-and-file priests joined the Iron Guard ranks and actively supported its policies; so did a minority of influential high-ranking clergymen such as Nicolae Bălan or Vartolomeu Stănescu.

Patriarch Miron Cristea, on the other hand, felt threatened by the Iron Guard's anti-establishment rhetoric and so did his successor Nicodim Munteanu. Thus, when the National Legionary State was proclaimed in 1940, Munteanu showed little enthusiasm. The insurrection of 1941 ended with Marshal Ion Antonescu crushing the Guard and taking full control of the country. The Holy Synod of the Romanian Orthodox Church was quick to condemn the Rebellion but, at the same time, numerous priests who had actively taken part in it were protected from repercussions by their respective bishops.

After the end of World War II, when Romania came under communist rule, Orthodox congregations outside Romania maintained, in some cases, strong connections to exiled Iron Guard members. Since the fall of communism in 1989, Orthodox groups or individual clergymen have displayed legionary sympathies, although connections between Romanian neo-fascist groups and the Church are neither official nor systematic.

== Background ==
At the end of the nineteenth-century, Romanian Orthodox theological education was in its infancy. Priestly training was practical and general rather than focused on theology. In the early twentieth century the curriculum of a priest included subjects such as hygiene, calligraphy, accountancy, psychology, Romanian literature, geometry, chemistry, botany, and gymnastics. A strong emphasis was placed on church music, canon law, church history, and exegesis. After World War I, however, a number of young theologians like Nichifor Crainic, Ioan Savin, or Dumitru Stăniloae went to study abroad. These theologians proved extremely influential after their return to Romania and helped shape theological academies. With a few rare exceptions, these theologians were also nationalists. By the 1920s the Church had adopted a nationalist narrative which highlighted the role of Orthodoxy in preserving the Romanian identity. Crainic advocated in his magazine Gândirea a mix of Orthodoxy and nationalism, while philosopher Nae Ionescu argued that Orthodoxy was inseparable from the Romanian identity. In the second half of the 1920s antisemitism also started to appear in official Church publications such as Revista teologică ("The Theological Magazine").

The Legion of the Archangel Michael emerged in 1927 as a breakaway group from A. C. Cuza's far-right, antisemitic movement called the National-Christian Defense League (LANC). Dissatisfied with the older generation of LANC, Corneliu Codreanu embarked on the creation of what he saw as an "idealistic, youthful, voluntary movement organized hierarchically". The name of the organization was inspired by an icon of the archangel that Codreanu's father had shown him in the Văcărești prison in 1923. Initially, very few LANC affiliates followed Codreanu (roughly twenty stundets). In an article from the first issue of the Legion's new newspaper, Pământul strămoșesc ("The Ancestral land"), titled "To the Icon!", Codreanu's brother-in-law and fellow legionnaire, Ion Moța, wrote "We have a religion, we are slaves to a faith. We are consumed in its fire and are completely dominated by it. We serve it until our last breath." From this profession of Christian faith, Moța proceeded to highlight the more earthly goals of the ultranationalist movement, writing "In this consists salvation, with freedom from the Yids and from all the deadly plagues that consume us: in restoring fruitfulness in the godly vine [în via dumnezească], which today is sick and barren, in our nation (at least here), fallen into satanic claws that lay waste to the soul and bring it loss". Throughout the late 1920s and the early 1930s, the Legion steadily increased its membership among students, peasants, workers and tradesmen, but also among priests. The name "Iron Guard" only appeared in 1930 and specifically designated the paramilitary branch of the organization whose official existence ended in 1933. However, the name remains a popular way of referring to the Legion as a whole.

== Rise of the Legion (1927–1938) ==
=== Church grassroots ===
Cuza's ultra-nationalist and antisemitic LANC had been critical of Orthodox Church hierarchy and lacked support among the clergy. Unlike Cuza, Codreanu felt a genuine sense of duty towards the Church and the clergy. Furthermore, his political narrative was unburdened by Cuza's overt rejection of the Old Testament. The Legion focused on traditional Orthodox themes like virtue, sacrifice, and regeneration. All this made Codreanu's organization increasingly attractive for rank-and-file Orthodox priests. The social status of priests in rural Romania gave them unique prestige and made them important assets that legionnaires sought to recruit. The total number of Orthodox priests to join the Legion by the mid-thirties was very large. Archival documents provide names for several hundred but estimates of the total number are closer to two thousand (up to 26% of all Romanian Orthodox priests). According to a police report from 1937, 1.2% of legionnaires were ordained priests. Beyond mere numbers, the priests were prone to assuming leadership roles within the organization because of their prestige; they also granted the organization access to their churches and they performed rituals on behalf of the Legion. All these aspects contributed to the Legion being so often associated with the Romanian Orthodox Church.

Like ordained priests, students of Orthodox theology also joined the Legion in large numbers. In universities, they played a significant role in the violent actions meant to take control of dormitories and canteens. An investigation conducted in a student dormitory in Bucharest in 1932 found that the governing committee had completely lost control of the facility as gangs of theology students were fighting students from other faculties and legionnaires regularly used the building to hold meetings.

In Orthodox seminaries the situation differed little from universities. The 1930s saw them turn into legionary strongholds with both students and teaching staff embracing legionary ideology. In Galați, for instance, seminary teacher Petre Andronescu was active organizing the local branch of the Legion in 1933. Legionary death-squads included a significant number of seminary students.

The so-called "work camps" were an important tool for propaganda, indoctrination and, ultimately, public celebration of the Legion. They were mostly construction and renovation projects using voluntary labor but in some cases they also took the form of organized participation in various petty jobs in villages. While the idea was not original among European fascist movements, the scale on which they were organized in Romania was unparalleled. Overall, the Orthodox clergy benefited from these projects, but in some cases fascist priests acted as facilitators and even leaders. These priests introduced the legionnaires to the local villagers and, at times, managed the work camps. Such examples highlight the vital role rural priests played in the Iron Guard. From the total number of work camp projects 39% involved Church property. Several high-ranking clergymen initially praised the legionnaires for their work camps; however, on October 23, 1935 Patriarch Miron Cristea forbade priests from participating in such projects. The ban was not effective, illustrating once more how deep the Legion's influence ran with rank-and-file clergy. When the Government officially banned work camps in 1936 a majority of ongoing projects still involved Church property.

The Legion's success in co-opting parish priests was not replicated in the case of high-ranking Orthodox clergymen. However, Church hierarchy was not immune to the organization's influence and a minority of important bishops became Iron Guard supporters.

=== Nicolae Bălan and the Academy of Theology in Sibiu ===
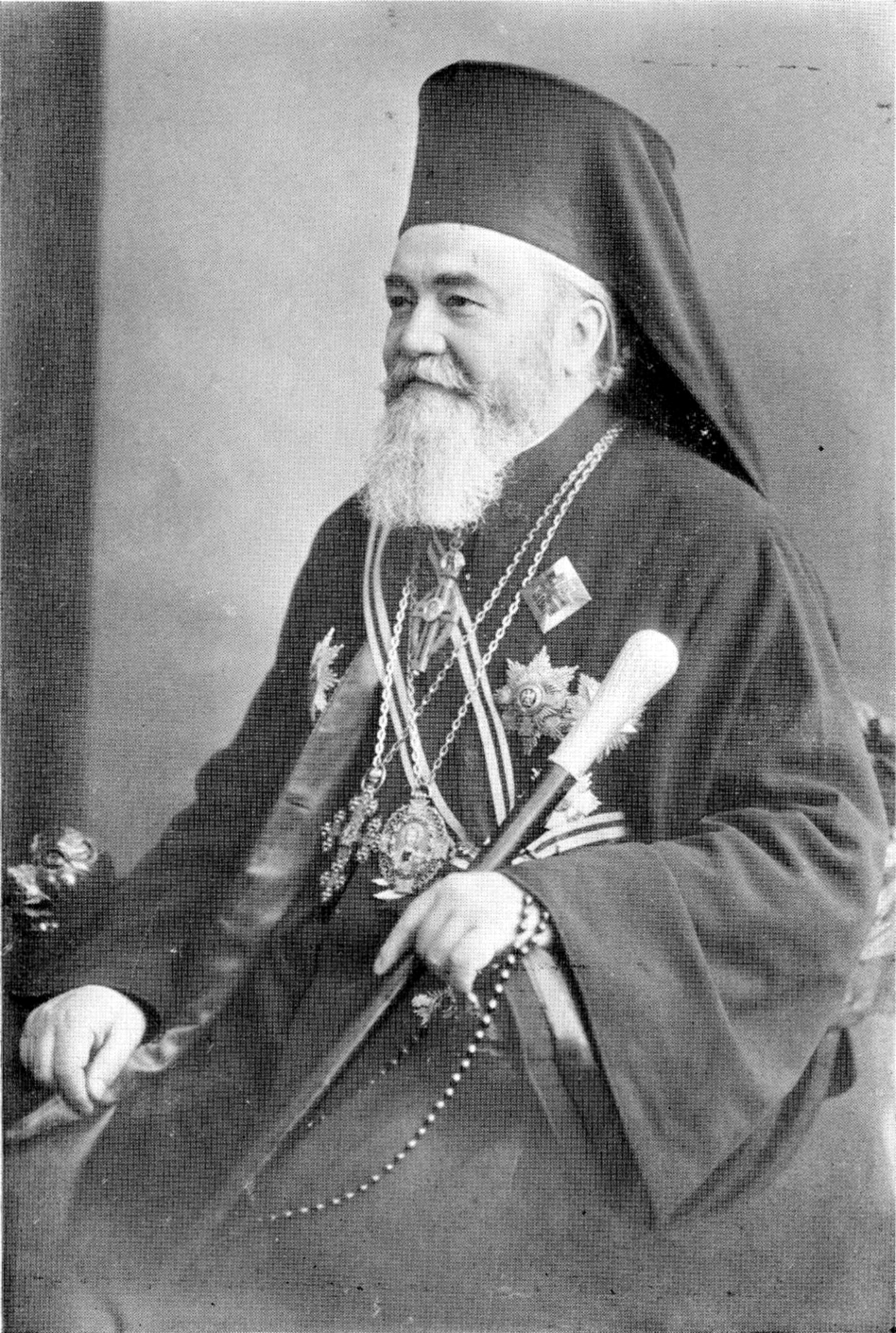
Metropolitan Nicolae Bălan

Nicolae Bălan, the highly influential Metropolitan of Transylvania and Archbishop of Sibiu, was one of the Legion's most open and valuable supporters. In the general elections of 1928, Bălan supported the National Peasants' Party, but later began perceiving it as the political arm of the Romanian Greek Catholic Church. Hence, he started providing financial support to far-right intellectuals like Nichifor Crainic or Nae Ionescu via periodicals like Calendarul ("The Calendar"), Cuvântul ("The Word"), and, later, Sfarmă-Piatră ("Stone Crusher"). By doing so, Bălan sought to draw Orthodox intellectuals away from the National Peasants' Party.

In 1930 Bălan replaced priest Iosif Trifa as editor in chief of weekly Lumina Satelor (The Light of villages) with Ioan Moța, father of Legion leader and founder Ion Moța. Lumina Satelor was very influential, printing a million copies a week, but under Moța's leadership it took an antisemitic and anti-Catholic line and sales dropped. Eventually, Iosif Trifa, a man who had always kept his distance from political parties, took his old job back.

In 1932 Valeriu Beleuță, a student of the Orthodox Theological Academy in Sibiu founded a periodical called Legiunea ("The Legion") in the village of Mândra, in Southern Transylvania. It only printed four issues but stood out as overtly antisemitic and anti-Catholic. According to Beleuță, any Greek-Catholic affiliated to the National Peasants' Party holding public office was likely to be a friend of the Jews and a traitor to the Romanian nation.

Glasul strămoșesc ("The Ancestral Voice") offers a different example. Founded in the major city of Cluj (Northern Transylvania), two years after Legiunea it initially attracted contributions from both Orthodox and Greek-Catholic clergymen who found common ground in their fascist views.

Nicolae Bălan's actions were instrumental in fueling support for the Legion in Transylvania. They also led the Academy of Orthodox Theology in Sibiu to grow into a fascist stronghold. Valeriu Beleuță was the earliest known legionary activist associated with the institution but more followed. Particularly influential in converting the teaching staff to the legionary cause was professor Spiridon Cândea.

=== Other high-ranking clergymen connected to the Legion ===
Vâlcea county was a unique case in interwar Romania. The Iron Guard branch in Vâlcea literally developed under the guidance of the local bishop - Vartolomeu Stănescu. Stănescu was an able manager with a talent for business, but he also had a more scholarly interest in theology. For the Legion, he acted as a regional patron. He discouraged any anti-legionary opposition among his subordinates and mobilized village priests and church resources in the service of Iron Guard propaganda. He remained a loyal supporter of the movement through its most difficult times. Legionary commandant Radu Gyr referred to Stănescu as the "true shepherd of legionary souls" and believed him to be a fit candidate for the Patriarchal throne in a Legionary Romania.

Gurie Grosu, Metropolitan of Bessarabia, also displayed legionary sympathies on various occasions. He was an open admirer of the Legion's "work camps" and in 1935 he publicly praised what he described as a Christian organization. His speech was relayed by the Iron Guard press: "Deeply impressed by the organization of legionary youth, students, intellectuals, and common people for constructive work, [...] we give our blessing to this direction embraced by them and implore the help of God for the strengthening, extension and growth of the legionary organization, which has a purely Christian character". Historian Roland Clark notes that Grosu was above all involved in a feud with King Carol II. He had demanded that the king end his relationship with his Jewish mistress Elena Lupescu. The legionnaires hated Lupescu, so when Grosu was forced to resign in 1936, following corruption charges, they naturally sided with him. Historian Oliver Jens Schmitt nuances Grosu's relations with the Royal Palace. He points out that the Metropolitan had both enemies and friends in the King's inner circle; this made Codreanu hesitate about supporting Grosu.

In the case of Visarion Puiu, Metropolitan of Bukovina (later Metropolitan of Transnistria), the legionary connection is well established in the 1940s but there is little evidence tying him to the movement throughout most of the 1930s. Puiu cautiously refrained from making his political views known, although some of his actions during his tenure as Metropolitan of Bukovina indicate antisemitism. It is established that shortly after Puiu's appointment in 1935, King Carol II began pressuring the Orthodox Church to depose him. This may be due to a number of reasons, Puiu's personality made him prone to conflict; furthermore the Metropolis of Bukovina was very wealthy and Puiu's financial dealings could have played a part in his falling out with the Royal Palace.

Patriarch Miron Cristea, on the other hand, was more cautions in his attitude towards the Legion. Cristea shared Codreanu's nationalism and antisemitism, but he feared the organization's anti-establishment narrative. Nonetheless, Cristea only attempted to curb the Legion's influence among the lower clergy after 1935. By that time the Legion was a mass movement.

=== Duca's assassination ===
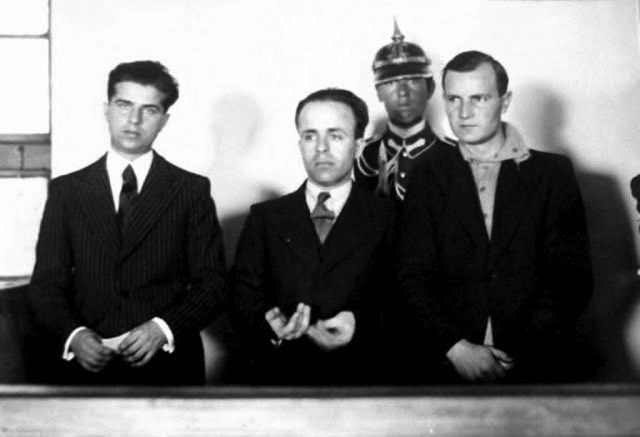
Ion G. Duca's assassins on trial

Ion G. Duca's government banned the Iron Guard on December 9, 1933. Thousands of legionnaires were arrested shortly before the elections of December 20 but most were only detained for a couple of weeks. Metropolitan Bălan publicly intervened on behalf of the legionnaires arrested in Sibiu. Nine days after the elections, prime-minister Ion G. Duca was assassinated in Sinaia by a group of young legionnaires. The gunman was a student named Nicolae Constantinescu; he was accompanied by Aromanian students Ion Caranica and Dorul Belimace. Duca's assassination triggered even more arrests, a sizeable minority of those detained being theology students and clergymen (in Bessarabia the authorities even arrested a bishop). Historian Oliver Jens Schmitt stresses that these arrests targeted "active aggressors", potential terrorists, people constituting a paramount danger to the state.

Other students were hunted down by the police but found refuge with sympathetic priests and professors. Theologian Nichifor Crainic was arrested and imprisoned with the legionnaires. Fellow theologian, priest Dumitru Stăniloae publicly supported Crainic in the newspaper he edited, Telegraful Român. Stăniloae blamed the murder on the nefarious influence of secular democracy and urged for more religious education. Crainic's theology courses at the University of Bucharest were taken over by priest Grigore Cristescu who led the students in singing legionnaire hymns in class. The theology student body, rallied by militant leaders such as Gheorghe Furdui, Florian Constantinescu, and Sica Popescu, also supported Crainic.

Crainic was not an ordained clergyman but was very influential in theological circles as an intellectual mentor and educator. Despite associating very closely with the Legion in 1933 he switched allegiance for LANC in 1934.

In the aftermath of Duca's murder, legionnaires were also arrested in Vâlcea, in Vartolomeu Stănescu's diocese. Some were local parish priests or had connections to the Orthodox Church. Police records show that the priests of Tetoiu and Tomșani, both Iron Guard members, were released on February 7, 1934, as well as three students of Theology and a church cantor from Stroești. The priest of Stroești, Gheorghe Doară, remained in detention. Police records from September 1934 show the local population supported the imprisoned legionnaires. A committee chaired by Bishop Stănescu himself was carrying out coordinated efforts to provide the prisoners with excellent food, medicine and clothes.

Stănescu's practically open support for what had become an illegal political movement went even further. In August 1934 he hosted what was a barely disguised legionary conference in Râmnicu Vâlcea. The event was organized by the legionary student association of Olt, Oltenia and Timoc. Participants included prominent Iron Guard activist Mihai Stelescu, Moldavian student leader Sandu Valeriu, and Tiana Siliman from Botoșani, the fiancée of Nicolae Constantinescu, Duca's assassin. Former members of the Legion's paramilitary units were also among the attendees. Bishop Stănescu provided the venue and accommodation in the episcopal dormitory. He celebrated a Te Deum for the participants who wore the iconic, and by that time illegal, green shirts. As the event was turning into a blatant defiance of the law, the authorities intervened. The legionnaires refused to leave town and 49 studentes were arrested; 39 were subsequently convicted. Undeterred, Stănescu maintained his close relations with the Legion. In 1935 the bishop's interactions with the fascists revolved around Petrache Lupu, a herdsman who claimed to have divine visions and gained a popular following. In December 1936 a bomb exploded in front of the episcopal palace - an indication of how controversial Stănescu had become.

=== Funerals of Moța and Marin ===
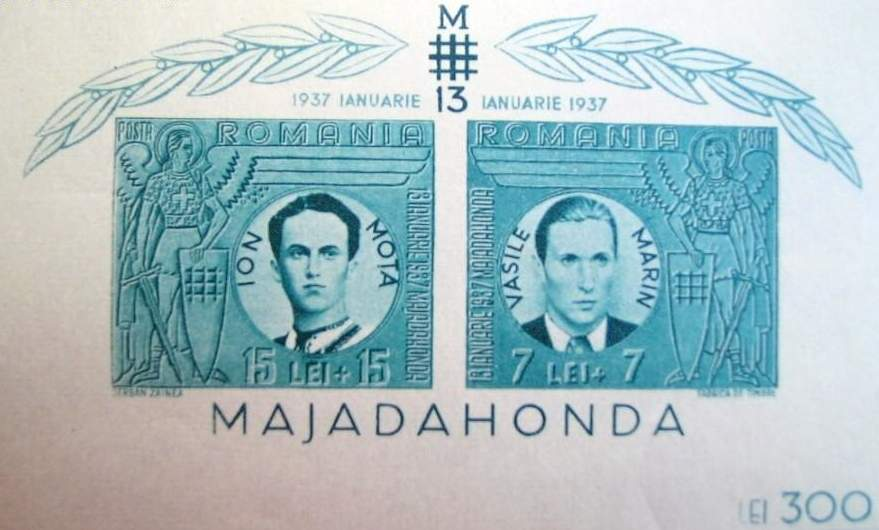
1941 stamp commemorating the deaths of Moța and Marin

Prominent legionnaires Ion Moța and Vasile Marin were killed by the same grenade on January 13, 1937, at Majadahonda where they were fighting for the Nationalist faction in the Spanish Civil War. On January, 17, a memorial service was held in Bucharest. The religious ceremony was performed by a group of priests led by the vicar (auxiliary bishop) of Bucharest, Veniamin Pocitan. The clergymen then accompanied Codreanu who led a parade of mourners into a public square, where they held yet another religious ceremony. Two priests gave short public speeches after the service, praising Moța's and Marin's sacrifice explaining that the two had died "for the cross of Christ." The crowd then sang Imnul legionarilor căzuți ("The hymn of the fallen legionnaires").

The two bodies were brought by mortuary train from Spain and reached the Romanian border on February 9. Instead of taking the shortest route to Bucharest as instructed by the Government, it took a detour through Bukovina, Moldavia, Transylvania and Wallachia stopping along the way. Wherever it stopped crowds of mourners gathered and religious services were held. In Bacău the service involved 30 priests, in Sibiu 32. In Cluj the service was led by vicar Nicolae Colan who praised the struggle of Moța and Marin against the "red madness", then Ion Agârbiceanu made a speech on behalf of the Romanian Greek-Catholic Church. When the train finally reached Bucharest it was met by a welcoming committee of over 180 priests and roughly 3,000 people. A crowd of 15,000–20,000 people waited outside the station.

The funeral ceremony was held on February 13, 1937. The pallbearers advanced in the shape of a cross and mourners filled the streets of Bucharest. Nicolae Iorga wrote of Codreanu: "[he] followed the funeral car like a sovereign, with everyone falling to their knees and bowing before him". Four high ranking Orthodox clergymen participated: metropolitans Nicolae Bălan of Transylvania and Gurie of Bessarabia, bishop Vartolomeu Stănescu of Râmnicu Vâlcea and vicar Veniamin Pocitan of Bucharest. They were accompanied by two hundred Orthodox priests. Nicolae Bălan, prayed: "We praise you, Father, that You send the light of the exemplary sacrifices of Your chosen ones, Ioan and Vasile, so that we might escape from the darkness of ambivalence, of doubt and of any quelling of the soul in the face of our destiny... May their names be written in your Book of Life and may they remain in the memory of our people forever and ever." After the ceremony the mourners joined in taking an oath binding them to the Legion: "I swear before God, and before your holy sacrifice for Christ and for the Legion, to separate myself from all worldly pleasures, to renounce worldly love, and to be always ready to die for the resurrection of my people".

Shortly after the funeral, Orthodox theologian Gheorghe Racoveanu and priest Grigore Cristescu founded the theological journal Predania ("The Tradinion") and Nae Ionescu quickly became involved in the project. The first issue featured a glorification of Moța and Marin and their sacrifice and reflected the Guard's obsession for martyrdom. Intended as a bi-monthly, Predania printed a total of twelve issues before being banned by the authorities. It stood out in several ways. It took a very academic approach to theology, a first among legionary periodicals, and openly sought to confront Church hierarchy on matters of dogma. Its editorial line was also profoundly anti-ecumenical, publishing attacks against Catholics, Protestants, Evangelicals.

Also in the aftermath of Moța and Marin's funeral, the Holy Synod issued a condemnation of Freemasonry. Moreover, following the lead of Metropolitan Bălan who wrote the anti-Masonic manifest, the Synod issued a "Christian point of view" against political secularism stating that the Church was in its right to choose which party was worthy of support, based on moral principles. Iron Guard leader Codreanu saluted the Synod's position and instructed that the Synod's proclamation be read by Guard members in their respective "nests" (i.e. chapters).

The funerals of Moța and Marin are a landmark event in the history of the Romanian Orthodox Church's interactions with the Legionary movement. They stand out by the sheer number of priests and bishops involved, by the echo they had in Orthodox periodicals and by the fusion of Orthodox rituals and Legionary ceremonial which they displayed. Historian Oliver Jens Schmitt notes, however, that it would be wrong to judge a complex relationship that evolved in time by a single event.

== From royal dictatorship to National Legionary State (1938–1941) ==
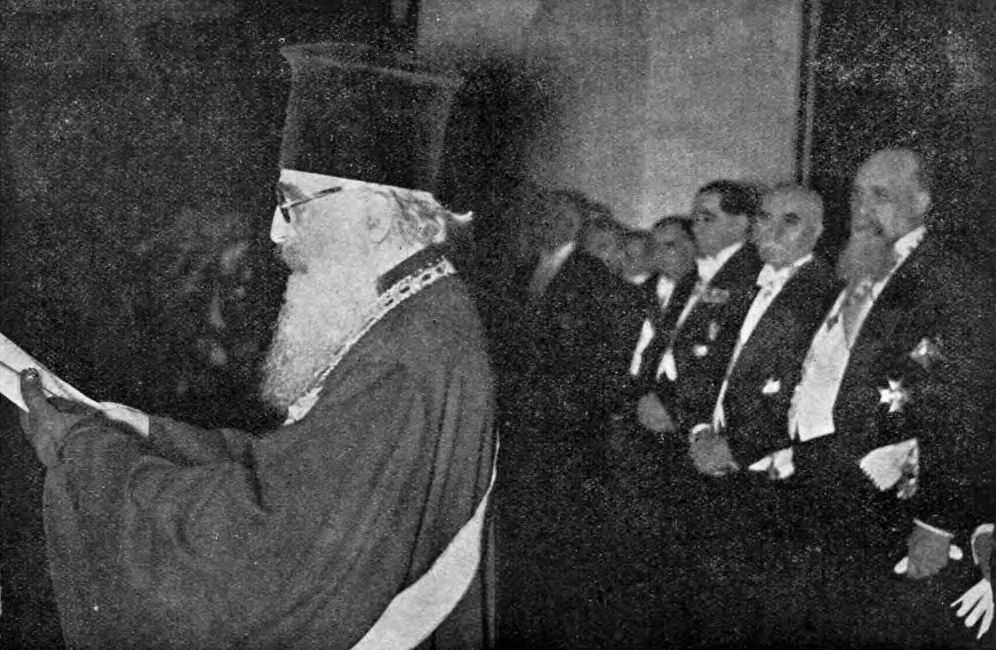
Patriarch Miron Cristea as Prime-Minister in 1938

The period known as the "royal dictatorship" began on February 10, 1938, when King Carol II suspended the Constitution, banned all political parties and appointed Orthodox Patriarch Miron Cristea as Prime-Minister. Armand Călinescu, a committed enemy of the Legion, remained Minister of internal affairs. Codreanu's initial reaction was cautious. On February 21, 1938, he formally disbanded the Legion announcing that he would not choose the path of violence and "transform Romania into a bloodied Spain". However, following a verbal clash with royal counselor Nicolae Iorga, he was arrested and convicted on libel charges. Then, in May, Codreanu was sentenced to ten years in prison for treason and inciting rebellion. In November he was killed in a staged escape attempt.

The King's decision to crush the Legion affected Church politics, namely the positions of those clergymen perceived as close to the Legion. Bishop Vartolomeu Stănescu was deposed and forced to retire to a monastery in 1938. After Cristea's death in March 1939, the Patriarchal office passed to a reluctant Nicodim Munteanu. Metropolitans Bălan and Puiu refused to compete for the position, arguably because of the King's opposition. Nicodim Munteanu had been rather sympathetic of the Legion in its early days; he had also met Codreanu during his tenure as bishop of Huși, but by the time he became Patriarch his views were aligned with Cristea's and he saw the anti-establishment nature of the Iron Guard as a threat.

Anti-legionary politician Armand Călinescu succeeded Cristea as Prime Minister. The conflict between the Government and the Legion escalated. Călinescu was assassinated by a legionary commando on September 21, 1939. Theologian Dumitru Stăniloae reacted: "We have to remember that they are adolescent boys, without experience..., without the power to judge using their own knowledge and understanding of things, easily stirred up adolescents, who cannot be calm enough to judge moderately, and who are incapable of discovering and establishing nuances, but who see things in exaggerated proportions, fervently starting off in one direction or another, completely condemning or completely worshiping a person or a way of seeing things. So it is not surprising if some of them fall victim to the sinful atmosphere of blind and exaggerated criticism which continued until yesterday, and which may exist even today."

The staff at the Academy of Theology in Sibiu kept a low profile under the Royal dictatorship, refraining from publicly engaging in politics. They nonetheless maintained close ties with the legionary underground and the library of the academy served as a hiding place for propaganda material, manuscripts of wanted legionnaires and, in some instances, even weapons. Visarion Puiu was deposed in May 1940. Tit Simedrea took over the Metropolis of Bukovina.

Romania remained under Royal dictatorship until September 6, 1940, when Carol abdicated. An openly pro-German coalition of the military, headed by marshal Ion Antonescu, and the Iron Guard took over. Patriarch Nicodim Munteanu's reaction was cautious and his September 1940 address was unenthusiastic. Stăniloae, on the other hand hailed the victory of the Legion as a victory for Christ and described the armies of Hitler as God's soldiers on Earth. The new regime was quick to reinstate Visarion Puiu as Metropolitan of Bukovina.

The new political situation also seemed favorable for Metropolitan Bălan. His legionary protégés at the academy in Sibiu were rewarded with various influential positions. Thus, Spiridon Cândea became legionary under-prefect of Făgăraș; Teodor Bodogae became head of the Legion's charity organization Ajutorul Legionar ("The Legionary Aid"); Liviu Stan was named general director at the Ministry of Religious Denominations. Furthermore, Bălan had a good personal relationship with Antonescu. Under the National Legionary State the professors in Sibiu were actively publishing fascist propaganda.

The Legion's cooperation with Marshal Antonescu ended violently in January 1941. Indeed, seeking full control of the Government, the legionnaires organized an insurrection known as the Legionary Rebellion.

== Legionary Rebellion and World War II (1941–1945) ==
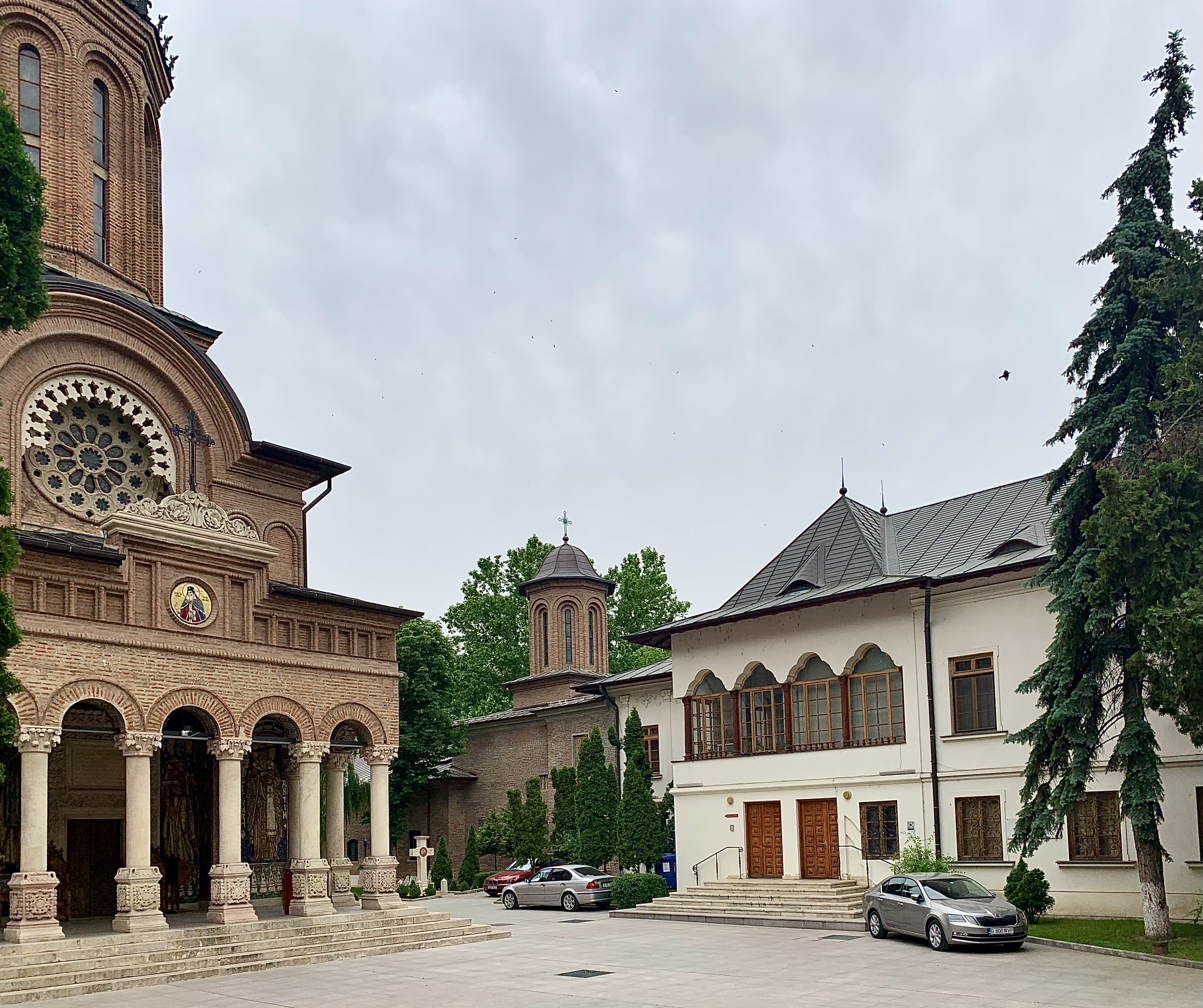
Antim Monastery in Bucharest in 2020

The participation of Orthodox priests and theology students in the violent events which took place in Romania between 21 and 23 January 1941 is well documented. It's worth noting that even before the insurrection, five students from the St. Nicholas Seminary in Râmnicu Vâlcea, all members of the Legion's youth organization, the Brotherhood of the Cross, vandalized the local synagogue and stole vestments, manuscripts, and other objects. During the rebellion, seminary head and known antisemite, priest Gheorghe Doară, assisted by priest Stoinac and armed students, barricaded the seminary building. They threatened to blow it up rather than surrender to the Army.

Ștefan Palaghiță, Orthodox priest and Legionary commandant, played an important part in the insurrection in Bucharest. Palaghiță had higher education in Orthodox theology and had been a priest in Berlin between 1938 and 1940. He had obtained a position with the Ministry of Religious Denominations and Arts thanks to legionary leader Horia Sima. During the Rebellion, he led an armed militia into the neighborhood of Dudești which had a numerous Jewish population. Palaghiță and his men engaged in looting, assault and murder. He also urged the population to resist the authorities who were trying to put an end to the looting.

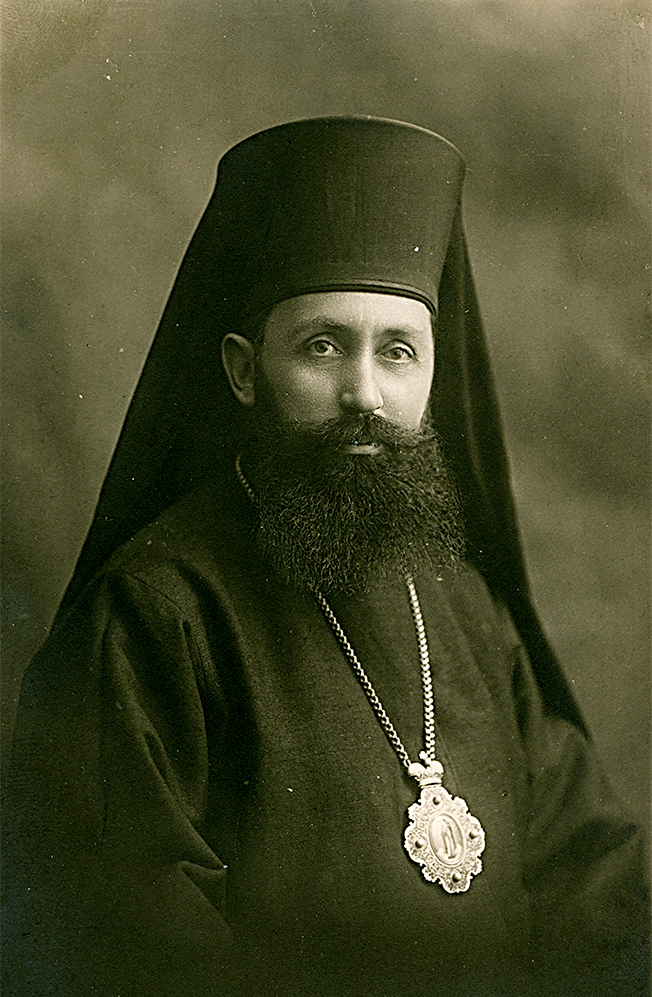
Bishop Visarion Puiu in the 1930s

Also in Bucharest, monks from the Antim Monastery, led by their abbot, Hieromonk Nicodem Ioniță, armed themselves and, using explosives, blew up a synagogue on Antim Street. The numerous Jewish inhabitants of the neighborhood hid in terror. Some of the monks involved were graduates of the Cernica Seminary, a Legionary stronghold. Among them, sources list Antim Nica (future bishop) but also Teoctist Arăpașu (future Patriarch of the Romanian Orthodox Church). Historian Ion Popa judges the evidence in Arăpașu's case controversial.

Viorel Trifa, head of the Romanian Christian Students' Union, took part in the insurrection in Bucharest and was instrumental in preparing it, spreading propaganda.

In Sibiu, staff and students of the Academy of Orthodox Theology, rounded up Jews in the courtyard of the academy and robbed them of their valuables at gunpoint. They were led by Professor Spiridon Cândea, and assisted by legionnaire militiamen.

Ultimately Antonescu crushed the rebellion. A total of 9000 people were arrested including 422 priests and 19 cantors. The first statement issued by the Council of Ministers (i.e. the Executive) after the insurrection explicitly mentioned priests: "[...]the priests who participated in the disorders of the past days will be severely punished." In a later report titled Pe marginea prăpastiei, 21-23 ianuarie 1941 ("On the cliff edge, January 21–23, 1941") Antonescu's Government again emphasized the participation of priests in the Rebellion: "Particularly serious is that many priests, preachers of the Christian faith […] headed the gangs of rebels with gun in hand instead of a cross, inciting them to barbaric and cruel acts."

Instances of clergymen helping runaway legionnaires after January 23, 1941, were also recorded. A police report noted that a car belonging to a monastery in Bucharest was used to transport legionnaires dressed-up as monks.

The Holy Synod was quick to condemn the Legionary Rebellion and publicly paint it as a diabolical temptation that had led the Iron Guard to undermine the state and the Conducător. Many of the clergymen who had participated in the Rebellion were, however, shielded by their bishops and continued parish work in remote villages. Romania's participation in World War II on the Axis side after June 1941 would provide them with opportunities for rehabilitation.

Also in the aftermath of the failed putsch, Visarion Puiu was once more replaced as Metropolitan of Bukovina by Tit Simedrea. Nicolae Bălan, on the other hand, and his legionnaire acolytes at the Theological Academy in Sibiu escaped unbothered with the exception of Spiridon Cândea who was detained for a few months in a camp in Tismana.

Some surviving legionnaires found refuge in Nazi Germany where they were held in protective detention in SS facilities near Buchenwald, Rostock, Berkenbruck. Young theologian Viorel Trifa, thanks to his privileged relation with the SS, enjoyed a particularly favorable treatment spending a lot of time in spas such as Bad Kissingen or Bad Mergentheim.

On August 15, 1941, The Holy Synod established a mission in Transnistria, the Romanian-occupied part of the Soviet Union. The assumption was that Soviet atheist rule had destroyed the Russian Orthodox Church and the Romanian Orthodox Church took it upon itself to "re-evangelize" the locals. The main architect of the enterprise was Archimandrite Iuliu Scriban. In 1942 the Mission evolved into an Exarchate and was taken over by Visarion Puiu. Antim Nica was also involved in the Mission as vice-head; he would become bishop of Ismail in 1944. Many of the missionaries were former affiliates of the Iron Guard, some were seeking rehabilitation after the 1941 insurrection. Abuse against the Jewish population was widespread and numerous reports of Orthodox priests partaking and profiting from the abuse exist.

In December 1943 Visarion Puiu resigned as Metropolitan of Transnistria. In his resignation letter he cited reasons such as shortage of resources and insufficient missionary priests, but it is reasonable to believe that with the tide of the War turning, Puiu was merely being cautious. In August 1944 Puiu traveled to Croatia to anoint a new Orthodox bishop, an event that would prove fortunate for him. On August 23, following King Michael's Coup, Romania changed sides and joined the War against Nazi Germany. Puiu went into exile. Meanwhile, the Nazis were setting up an Iron Guard Romanian Government in exile. Constantin Papanace, a rival of Horia Sima, suggested General Ion Gheorghe as head of Government, and, when the latter was discarded, Visarion Puiu. Horia Sima, on the other hand, actively sought to undermine Puiu's candidacy. The tension between the two was considerable. When the Nazis ultimately favored Sima, Ștefan Palaghiță and other legionnaires from the rival faction proposed the creation of an Orthodox episcopate headed by Puiu in Nazi Germany. The plan was opposed by Sima who suggested that Puiu join his government instead. According to historian Paul A. Shapiro, Puiu initially accepted but then wavered and, finally, declined. Historian Ion Popa, however, citing intelligence service cables, argues that when Radio Donau finally aired the announcement about the creation of Horia Sima's Government in exile in December 1944, Visarion Puiu was listed as a member. Popa's argument is based on the fact that the communists had not targeted Puiu for arrest until December 14, 1944, after the Radio Donau broadcast, when the clergyman's name appeared on a list designating him as Religious Secretary of the Iron Guard Government in exile.

Puiu's presence in the Kitzbuhel camp in Austria, in American custody, in May 1945 is documented. Chaplain (Colonel) Herbert E. MacCombie of the 36th Infantry Division reported on his encounter with the Romanian clergyman: "He (i.e., Puiu) told me that the Germans had been paying him several hundred marks a month, plus food and lodgings to support their cause. He asked what I thought the Americans would pay him to switch sides. Since he had not been much help to the Germans, I did not think the Americans would pay him anything. I arranged quarters and rations for him. He had his 'niece' with him. I arranged separate quarters for her." Colonel MacCombie's account is important because it proves Puiu had been receiving special treatment from the Nazi authorities along with other exiled legionnaires.

Another notable clergyman involved with Horia Sima's exiled legionnaires and connected to Puiu was priest Vasile Boldeanu. Boldeanu had joined the organization early, had held a number of mid- and upper-middle-level positions reaching the rank of Legionary commandant at the time of the National Legionary State and had officiated during the religious service held at the exhumation of Codreanu's body in November 1940. Arrested after the rebellion, he had spent two years in prison before escaping to the German occupied Serbian Banat. Involved in the legionary underground, he was arrested by the Nazi authorities in June 1944 and sent to join the legionnaires being held at Buchenwald. Both Puiu and Boldeanu would play a significant role in the Romanian Orthodox community in Paris after the war.

== Under communist rule and in exile (1945–1989) ==
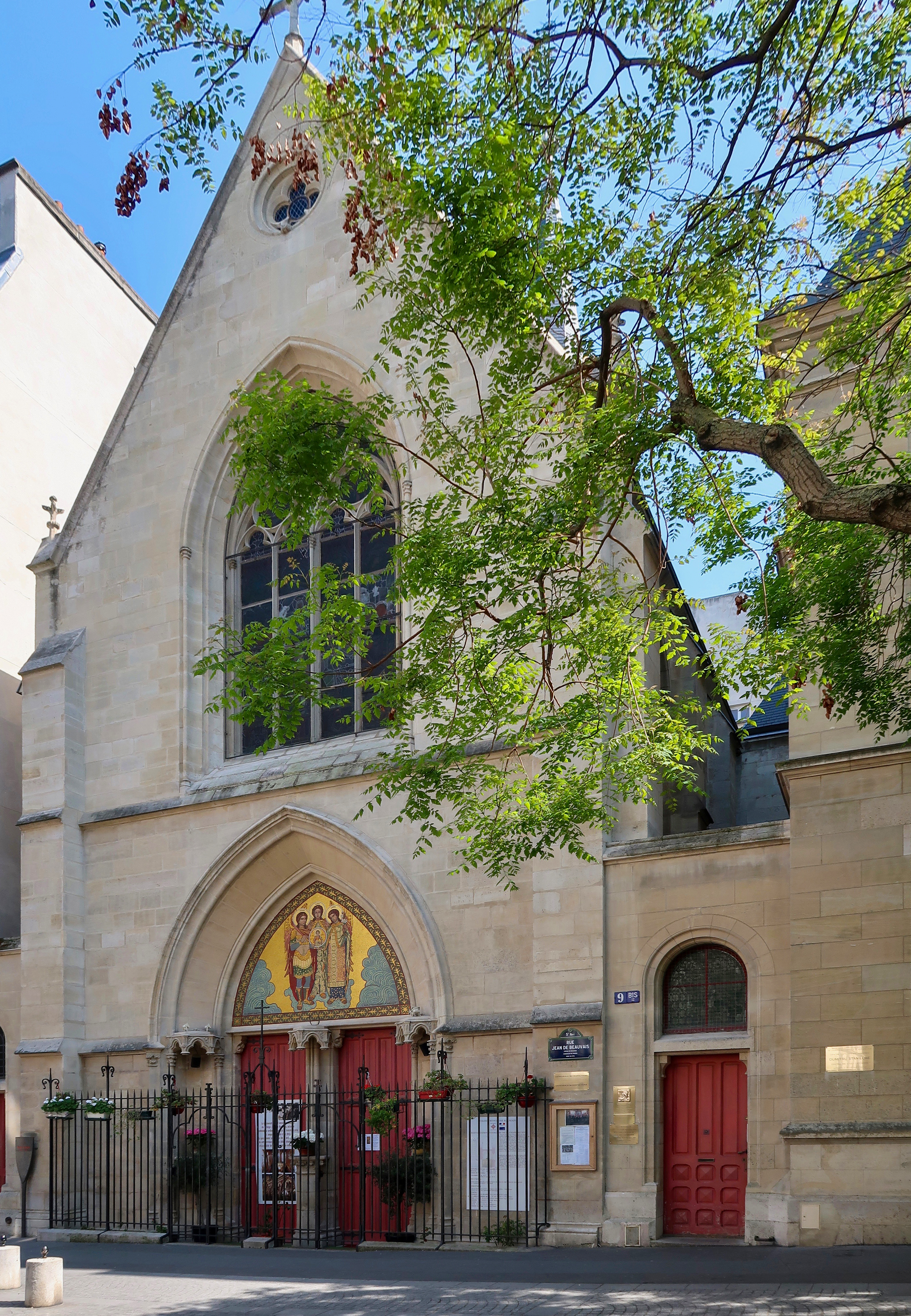
The Church of the Archangels in Paris where Vasile Boldeanu officiated

Under communist rule after World War II, some clergymen were imprisoned for their collaboration with the fascists, while others became informers of the communist secret police, the Securitate. Many priests who had been active in Transnistria faced prosecution. Communist prosecutors were specifically looking for connections to the Iron Guard, rather than investigating persecution of Jews.

Metropolitan Bălan narrowly avoided being purged; he later supported the communists in their dissolution of the Romanian Greek Catholic Church. Much like their spiritual master Bălan, the staff at the Academy of Theology in Sibiu generally adapted well to the new regime. Some, such as Liviu Stan or future metropolitan Nicolae Mladin, managed to advance their careers in remarkable manner despite their fascist past.

Visarion Puiu was sentenced to death in absentia in 1946 for his involvement in Transnistria, his relations with the Legionary movement and his collaboration with the Nazis in the final stages of the war. Later, he was also defrocked by the Holy Synod. He became the head of an independent diocese established by the Orthodox Romanians in Paris after 1948. In this new position, he placed legionnaire priest Vasile Boldeanu, in charge of the largest Parisian congregation. Horia Sima, who had survived the War and remained the leader of a now exiled Iron Guard, recognized the importance of émigré Orthodox Church structures and re-established contact with Puiu in 1949.

Paradoxically the death sentence did not prevent the communist regime from reaching out to Puiu and trying to recruit him in later years. According to a secret document dated 1955, Puiu asked the communist leader Gheorghiu Dej for the full restoration of his clerical rank, as he wished to be appointed Metropolitan of Moldavia. The demands were so unreasonable that the regime concluded Puiu was not genuinely interested in returning to Romania. He died in Paris in 1964.

Unlike other émigré groups, legionnaires lacked access to media such as Radio Free Europe. They did however still wield considerable influence in the Orthodox congregations outside Romania. This was evident in the case of Puiu's breakaway archdiocese in Paris but also in another case, in the United States. The bishop of the Romanian Episcopate in America, Policarp Morușca, retired abruptly in 1947. When the Romanian Patriarchate appointed a new bishop in 1950, church leaders from Detroit refused to accept someone they perceived as "communist" and instead appointed Valerian (Viorel) Trifa, effectively creating a schism within the Church. Trifa, known for his involvement in the 1941 rebellion, had also served for a time as Visarion Puiu's secretary during his exile. The altar in Trifa's episcopal church featured icons of Codreanu and the bishop regularly attended meetings of émigré legionnaires.

The schism in the US was only resolved in 1966 thanks to the mediation of another former legionnaire: Bartolomeu Anania. Anania had been member of the youth branch of the Legion under the National Legionary State. He managed to mediate the conflict and a new bishop, acceptable to both parties, was appointed.

The legionnaires who found themselves behind bars in communist Romania experienced prison in different ways. They taught each other foreign languages, history, philosophy, literature, mathematics, and theology. Poems by Crainic or Radu Gyr were circulated among prisoners and memorized along with extensive Bible passages. All this contributed to the myth of the erudite legionnaire, devout and disciplined and caused younger prisoners to see former Iron Guard affiliates as role models. Some incarcerated fascists followed the teachings of Traian Trifan, lawyer and former prefect of Brașov under the National Legionary State. These teachings focused on prayer, introspection, and passive resistance as the most effective way of surviving prison. From 1948 until the amnesty of 1964 these prisoners fasted, practiced the prayer of the heart, and sought to live the holiest lives possible. Later testimonies of their religious experiences behind bars inspired numerous hagiographical writings after the fall of communism.

== After the fall of communism in 1989 ==
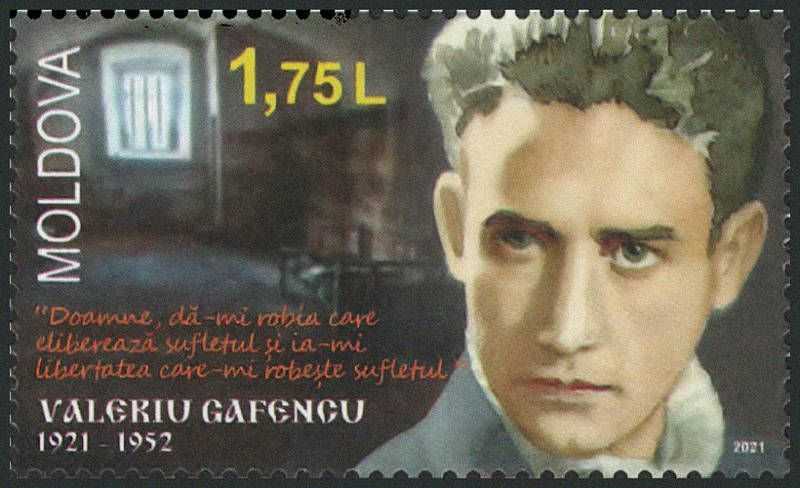
Moldovan stamp of Iron Guard activist Valeriu Gafencu, often designated as a "prison saint". The text on the stamp reads "Lord, grant me the slavery which frees my soul and take away the freedom which enslaves my soul".

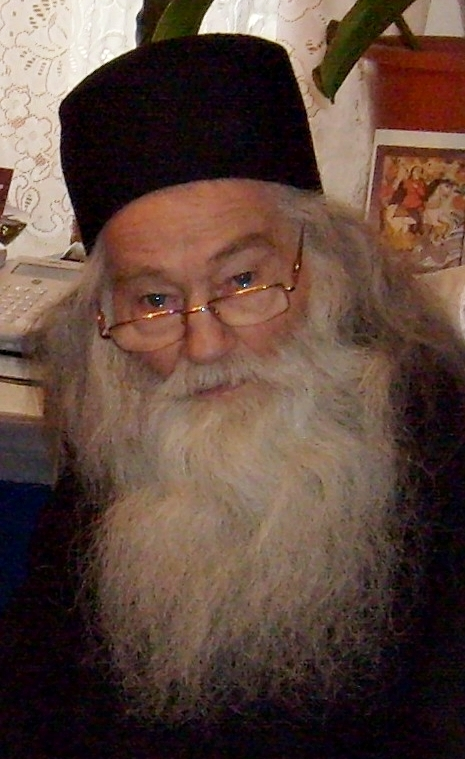
Archimandrite Iustin Pârvu in 2008

In the aftermath of the Revolution of 1989, the memory of the communist dictatorship was more acute in Romania than the memory of fascism. By the early 2000s, the anti-communist narrative became mainstream. In this context, several groups started advocating canonization for the men who had shown Christian devotion as they met death in prison. A social phenomenon developed around the so-called "prison saints". Sociologist Monica Grigore, writing in 2015, reported religious worship of the dead prisoners' bones, perceived as relics, as well as the existence of icons featuring the "prison saints". She also cited a 2012 travel agency advertising Aiud, a town where many political prisoners had been held, with a leaflet reading: "Come to pray and bring your gratitude to the Romanian martyr saints who sacrificed themselves for the sins of our nation when the red beast tried to suffocate our Christian Orthodox belief. Come to Aiud!".

The phenomenon has a problematic political side, since many of these would-be-saints, such as Valeriu Gafencu, were legionnaires. Moreover, the worship of "prison saints" was often accompanied by the public display of legionary symbols. This triggered reactions from organizations such as the Elie Wiesel National Institute for the Study of Holocaust in Romania. The Romanian government addressed these concerns by amending the legislation on Holocaust denial to include a legal definition of the Iron Guard movement as a fascist and criminal organization, thus banning the public display of its symbols. The new legislation left the followers of the "prison saints" undeterred. They argue it is not the politics of former prisoners which drives them but religious resilience. Writing in 2015 historian Roland Clark noted that "it [is] difficult to speak of legionaries as villains in contemporary Romania, where many people, especially some Orthodox Christians and those on the extreme right, see legionaries as Orthodox saints". The explanation, according to Clark, resides in the historical circumstances in which prisoners and exiles formulated their memories, entrenching the idea of the Legion as a spiritual movement.

Among Romanian Orthodox clergymen, Archimandrite Iustin Pârvu, a man with an Iron Guard past of his own, was often associated with the "prison saints" movement. Pârvu was a charismatic figure within the Church, the subject of several documentaries and an honorary citizen of several Romanian towns, including Aiud in 2014. It was at Pârvu's initiative that a monastery, which opened in 2004, was established in the cemetery of Aiud. Pârvu publicly referred to the prisoner's remains as "relics". One of Pârvu's followers, theologian and writer Danion Vasile, reported fragrant oil miraculously springing from some human remains given to him by Pârvu. The event supposedly took place during a conference in Iași in March 2009.

Pârvu's 2011 birthday celebration caused public scandal when nuns at the Petru Vodă monastery sang the iconic Iron Guard song "Holy Legionary Youth". The Church initially tried to avoid the topic, but after several days of silence, public outrage led the Orthodox Patriarchate to issue a press statement. The final sentence read: "The Romanian Patriarchate does not initiate and promote racist, xenophobic, and antisemitic movements and does not support enmity based on religious or ethnic reasons as they are contrary to the Gospel of love toward all people." The statement avoided any direct condemnation of those involved in the incident or of the Legion. Moreover, when Iustin Pârvu died in 2013, a large ceremony was held with the Metropolitan of Moldavia officiating the burial service in person.

The Romanian Orthodox Church has not officially canonized any of the Aiud detainees and it does not recognize their human remains as "relics". According to Grigore, this is likely related to the former prisoners' far-right affiliations and the effect such a canonization might have on the Church's image. In practice however, the Church has, discretely, contributed to the development of a "martyr's memoriae". In 2019 an official press statement was issued by the Romanian Patriarchate. It specified that a collective remembrance day had been instituted for the "anticommunist political detainees" on March 9 as well as a day of devotion for "the martyrs of communist prisons" on May 14. However, the statement stressed that it is God who grants sainthood, the Church is there to recognize and proclaim it after a lengthy process.

Independently from the "prison saints" movement, a number of neo-fascist organizations emerged in Romania after 1989, some claiming legionary heritage. In some cases, entities or individuals from within the Orthodox Church have been noted to support them. In 1998 a memorial service for Moța and Marin took place in the Orthodox Cathedral in Cluj-Napoca. Neo-legionary organizations spread propaganda material at the event. However, the preferred gathering place of Cluj-based neo-legionnaires was a smaller church on Strada Horea where they could rely on the support of the local priest. It was in this church that memorial services for Sima and Codreanu were held in 1999. In 2000, a nationalist meeting was organized at the Sâmbăta de Sus Monastery in Făgăraș. The establishment of legionary "nests" in various Romanian cities was discussed.

Also in the aftermath of the regime change in 1989, Orthodox circles began re-evaluating Visarion Puiu's legacy. In 1990, The Holy Synod vacated its 1950 decision to defrock Puiu and posthumously reinstated him among the clergy. Over the following decades Puiu's popularity grew, particularly in Romanian Moldavia, where conferences and symposiums were often organized to honor his memory. Articles printed in the national press often presented Puiu in a favorable light and in 2003 a member of the Romanian parliament publicly called for Puiu's body to be returned to Romania.

The Romanian Orthodox Christian Students' Association, ASCOR, is a youth organization with several thousand members. Its monthly publication Schimbarea la față ("The Transfiguration") occasionally featured quotes of inter-war Iron Guard authors and articles celebrating the heroism of inter-war youths. Cecilie Endresen notes that this could either be read as coded support for the Legionary revival movement or as "an expression of a more general Romanian nationalism and Orthodox traditionalism."

In the particular case of Timișoara, Cecilie Endresen noted that students of Orthodox theology with neo-legionary sympathies had some connection to the periodical Gazeta de vest ("The Western Gazette"). Gazeta de vest was the first post-1989 neo-legionary publication and Endresen describes it as "characterised by poor layout and rhetoric that is conspicuously hateful and racist even by (neo-)Legionary standards". It is worth noting that some articles from Gazeta de vest were reprinted by the nationalist, Church sanctioned, Orthodox journal Scara ("The Ladder").

As a general assessment of the Romanian Orthodox Church's connection with Legionary revival, Cecilie Endresen notes that "[o]fficially, the Romanian Orthodox Church is neutral on political questions. Still the church is, in many respects, an influential political actor with a conspicuously nationalist orientation that often overlaps with neo-Legionarism." She observes that "it is fair to say there have been (and probably still are) a number of personal, ideological and practical connections between the neo-Legionary Movement and the Church. It must be added, however, that these connections are unofficial and that they are not systematic."
