= Maglavit Monastery =

Monastery in Romania

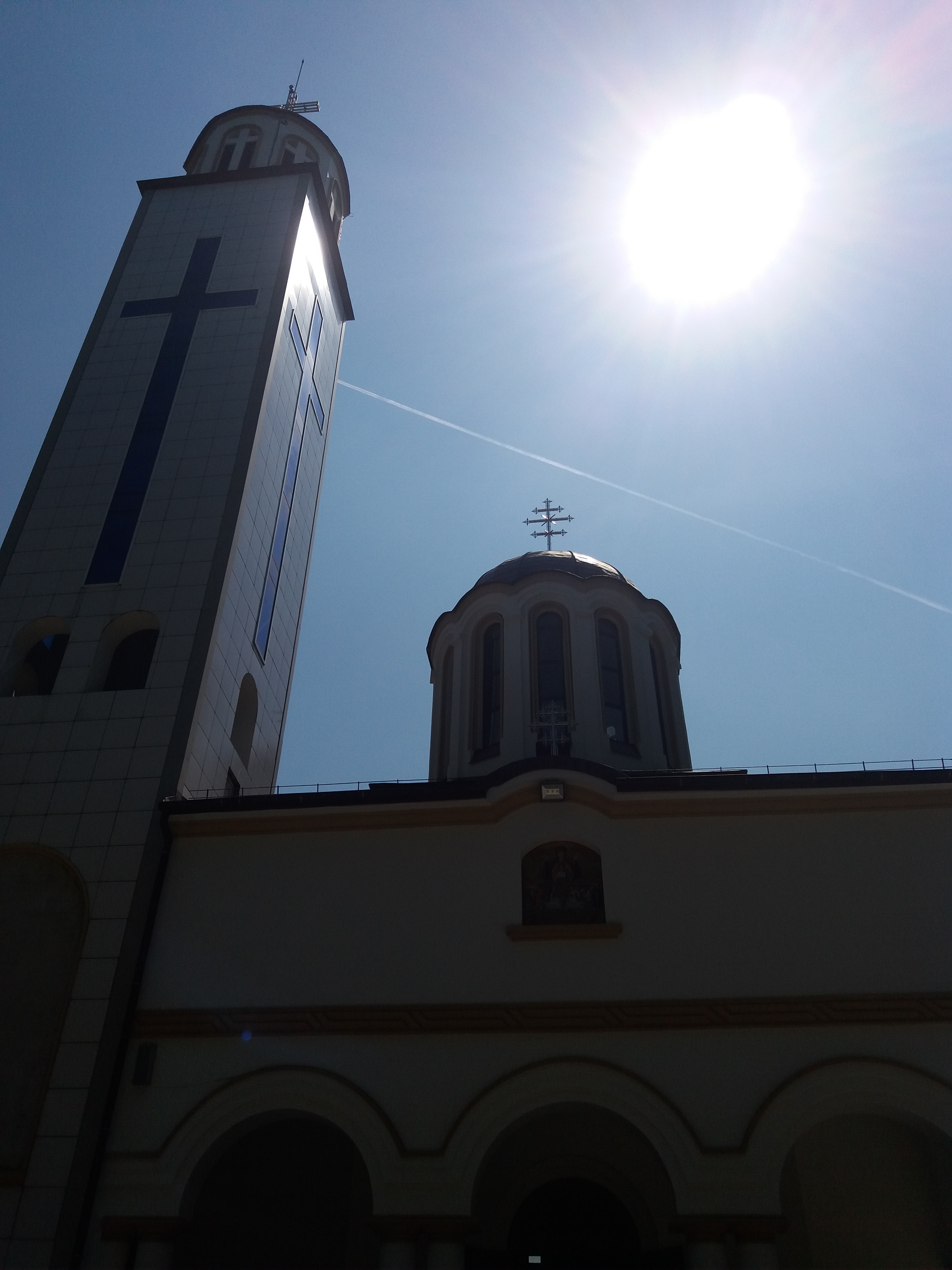
- Maglavit Monastery

- Location within Romania

Monastery information
- Order: nuns
- Established: 14 September 1935

People
- Important associated figures: Petrache Lupu

Site
- Location: Maglavit, Dolj County, Romania
- Coordinates: 44°01′56″N 23°03′56″E
- Public access: yes

Maglavit Monastery is an Orthodox monastery in Romania, located in Maglavit commune in Dolj County. It is built at the place where the shepherd Petrache Lupu would have seen God. The place was called "La buturug". Petrache Lupu was a deaf and mute shepherd that convinced hundreds of thousands of pilgrims that God appeared to him. The monastery was closed in the communist period and opened after 1989. In 2019 the International Meeting of Orthodox Youth happened at the Monastery with over 4,000 young people.

== See also ==
- Petrache Lupu

== Bibliography ==
- România - Harta mănăstirilor, Amco Press, 2000
- Mănăstirea Maglavit, loc al miracolelor și credinței
- Mănăstirea Maglavit, punct de atracţie pentru pelerini
- Manastirea Maglavit
- Mănăstirea Maglavit şi-a sărbătorit hramul
- DOSAR: Fenomenul Maglavit şi Petrache Lupu
