= Ceptura Coal Mine =

Coal mine in Romania

Ceptura Coal mine
- Location within Romania

Location
- Location: Ceptura, Prahova County, Romania; 45°1′0″N 26°20′0″E (approximate)

Production
- Products: Coal

History
- Opened: 1954

Owner
- Company: Ploiești National Coal Company

Ceptura Coal Mine is an open-pit mining exploitation it is considered one of the largest in the country of Romania located in Ceptura, Prahova County with estimated coal reserves of 18 million tonnes.

The coal mine opened in 1954. The legal entity managing the Câmpulung mine is the Ploiești National Coal Company, which was set up in 1957.
