= Petrache Lupu =

Shepherd who claimed to have seen God in a vision

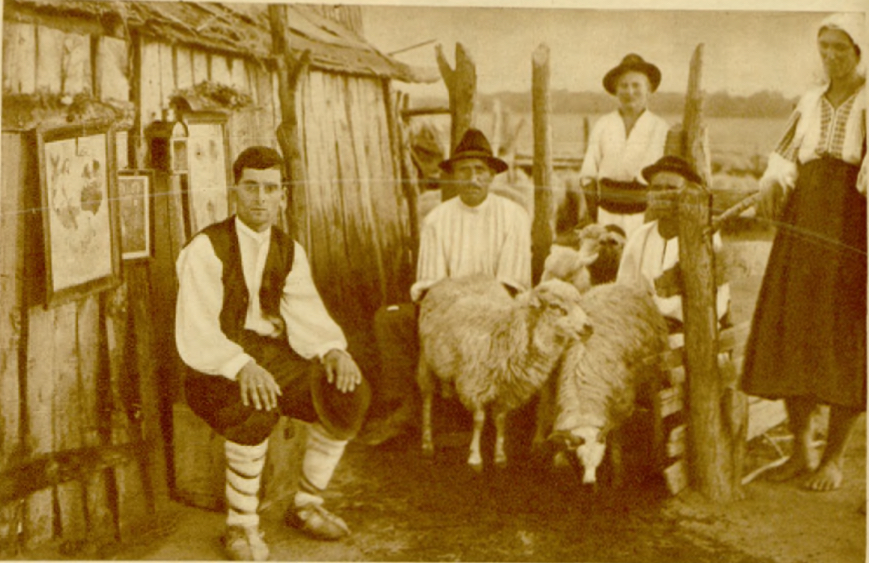
- Lupu (left) in 1935
- Born: Petrache Lupu; October 12, 1907; Maglavit, Dolj
- Died: December 14, 1994 (aged 87); Maglavit, Dolj
- Other name: Petre Lupu
- Occupation: shepherd
- Known for: divine visions

Petrache Lupu (born 12 October 1907, Maglavit, Dolj, Romania - died December 14, 1994, Maglavit, Dolj, Romania) was a shepherd from Maglavit commune, who claimed to have had divine visions. In 1935 a mass phenomenon began, with Maglavit becoming a Christian pilgrimage place for crowds of people. The Maglavit Monastery is built in the area.

Lupu stated that he saw God hovering above the earth, who urged him to tell others to repent, honour the Lord's Day, as well as fast on Wednesdays and Fridays. Lupu erected a Christian cross where the apparition took place; it soon became a place of Christian pilgrimage, with the fountain water being said to be miraculous.

As Lupu rose to fame, he also attracted the attention of some fascist and traditionalist intellectuals. For instance, the far-right writer and politician Nichifor Crainic referred to Lupu (alongside other figures and currents in mysticism) in his articles from the 1930s. The fascist politician Alexandru Cuza and his National-Christian Defense League praised Lupu after the latter supposedly cured the "uncontrollable blinking" of a journalist associated with Cuza, and Lupu was visited by the Iron Guard-affiliated bishop Vartolomeu Stănescu. Mihai Vâlsan, a traditionalist and ex-student of Mircea Eliade, also visited Lupu, but believed him to be a fraud (which he reported to the French traditionalist René Guénon). In the years after 1935, Lupu visited various eparchies and developed contacts with leading figures in Fascist Romania.

During the socialist era, Lupu was imprisoned for a period of time.

== See also ==
- Relations between the Romanian Orthodox Church and the Iron Guard
