= Glasul Patriei =

Romanian propaganda publication

Glasul Patriei (Romanian for 'The Voice of the Fatherland') was Communist Romania's propaganda publication aimed at Romanian emigres, that served the aim of promoting the Socialist Republic of Romania as a harbour not only of socialist ideas, but also as a natural continuation of Romanian nationalist and Orthodox traditions. Romanians with nationalist, Orthodox Christian or far-right credentials (such as people who once had been close to the fascist Iron Guard) were picked as the authors.

The journal legitimized the regime by associating with members of the former elite and supported the view that former opponents of socialism were not being discriminated against.

The journal portrayed the everyday reality of Romania positively, extolled how culture was now supposedly easy to access and re-interpreted symbolic figures of Romanian nation in a way that fit the regime. Thus, Nichifor Crainic portrayed the proto-fascist Octavian Goga as a peasant poet bemoaning the suffering peasants' hardship under the landlords' rule.

Radu Gyr was also a notable collaborator with Glasul Patriei.

Founded in 1955, Glasul Patriei appeared until 1972. It was then replaced by Tribuna României, which ran until the Romanian Revolution.
