= George Dorul Dumitrescu =

Romanian poet and columnist

George Dorul Dumitrescu (born Gheorghe Dumitrescu; February 14, 1901 or 1904–1985) was a Romanian prose writer and columnist.

Born in Ceptura, Prahova County, he attended high school in Bucharest from 1916 to 1925, and studied at the University of Bucharest's literature faculty, from which he obtained a degree in 1931. In 1933, he became a substitute teacher of Romanian at the military high school in Chișinău. In 1937, he began teaching at a trade school in Bucharest. He was later a civil servant within the "work and entertainment" section of the Labor Ministry.

Dumitrescu's first published work was prose that appeared in Universul literar in 1928. He co-edited Pagini basarabene and Veac nou magazines. His work appeared in Cele trei Crișuri, Universul literar, Neamul românesc literar, Brazde adânci, România nouă literară, Telegraful, Adevărul literar și artistic, Revista Fundațiilor Regale and Gândirea. In 1933, he published La fetița dulce, a book of tales, and he was awarded the Romanian Writers' Society prize the same year. The monograph Viața și opera lui Leon Donici came out in 1936. He died in Bucharest and was buried at Bellu cemetery.
