= Teodoreanu =

Teodoreanu is a Romanian surname that may refer to:

- Ionel Teodoreanu (1897–1954), Romanian novelist and lawyer
- Păstorel Teodoreanu (1894–1964), Romanian humorist, poet and gastronome, brother of Ionel
- Ștefana Velisar Teodoreanu (1897–1995), Romanian novelist, poet and translator, wife of Ionel
