= Păstorel Teodoreanu =

Romanian writer (1894–1964)

Alexandru Osvald "Păstorel" Teodoreanu
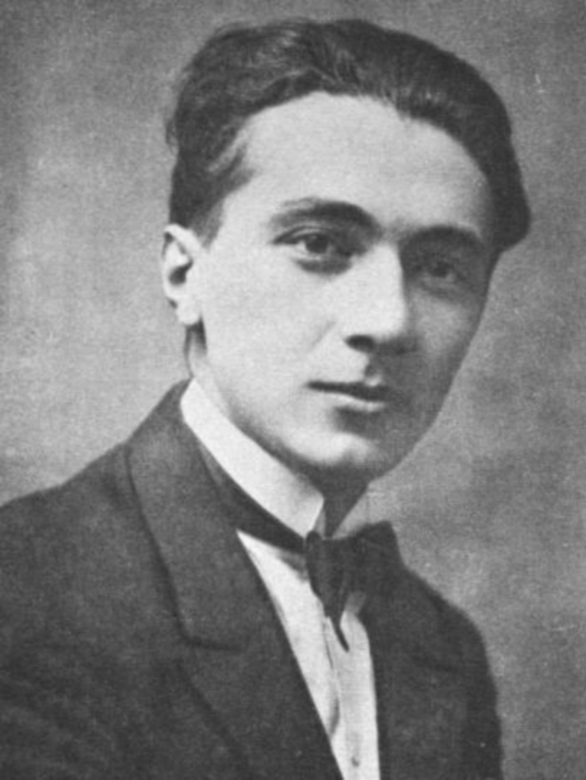
- Păstorel c. 1926
- Born: July 30, 1894; Dorohoi, Dorohoi County, Kingdom of Romania
- Died: March 17, 1964 (aged 69); Armenian Quarter, Bucharest, People's Republic of Romania
- Occupations: Poet; columnist; food critic; lawyer; soldier; propagandist; copywriter
- Writing career
- Pen name: Iorgu Arghiropol-Buzatu, Hidalgo Bărbulescu, Mița Cursista, Nicu Modestie, Mic dela Pirandola, Vălătuc
- Period: 1916–1964
- Genres: Aphorism, comedy, epigram, erotic literature, essay, fable, fantasy, frame story, historical novel, parody, pastiche, sketch story, sonnet, political poetry, advertorial
- Literary movement: Symbolism (Romanian), Gândirea, Viața Românească

Păstorel Teodoreanu, or just Păstorel (born Alexandru Osvald (Al. O.) Teodoreanu; July 30, 1894 – March 17, 1964), was a Romanian humorist, poet and gastronome, the brother of novelist Ionel Teodoreanu and brother in law of writer Ștefana Velisar Teodoreanu. He worked in many genres, but is best remembered for his parody texts and his epigrams, and less so for his Symbolist verse. His roots planted in the regional culture of Western Moldavia, which became his main source of literary inspiration, Păstorel was at once an opinionated columnist, famous wine-drinking bohemian, and decorated war hero. He worked with the influential literary magazines of the 1920s, moving between Gândirea and Viața Românească, and cultivated complex relationships with literary opinion-makers such as George Călinescu.

After an unsuccessful but scandalous debut in drama, Teodoreanu perfected his work as a satirist, producing material which targeted the historian-politician Nicolae Iorga and the literary scholar Giorge Pascu, as well as food criticism which veered into fantasy literature. As an affiliate of Țara Noastră, he favored a brand of Romanian nationalism which ran against Iorga's own. Corrosive or contemplative, Păstorel's various sketches dealt with social and political issues of the interwar, continuing in some ways the work of Ion Luca Caragiale. In the 1930s, inspired by his readings from Anatole France and François Rabelais, he also published his celebrated "Jester Harrow" stories, mocking the conventions of historical novels and Renaissance literature. His career peaked in 1937, when he received one of Romania's most prestigious awards, the National Prize.

Teodoreanu was employed as a propagandist during World War II, supporting Romania's participation on the Eastern Front. From 1947, Păstorel was marginalized and closely supervised by the communist regime, making efforts to adapt his style and politics, then being driven into an ambiguous relationship with the Securitate secret police. Beyond this facade conformity, he contributed to the emergence of an underground, largely oral, anti-communist literature. In 1959, Teodoreanu was apprehended by the communist authorities, and prosecuted in a larger show trial of Romanian intellectual resistants. He spent some two years in prison, and reemerged as a conventional writer. He died shortly after, without having been fully rehabilitated. His work was largely inaccessible to readers until the 1989 Revolution.

== Biography ==
=== Early life ===
The Teodoreanu brothers were born to Sofia Muzicescu, wife of the lawyer Osvald Al. Teodoreanu. The latter's family, originally named Turcu, hailed from Comănești; Osvald's grandfather had been a Romanian Orthodox priest. Sofia was the daughter of Gavril Muzicescu, a famous composer from Western Moldavia, and herself a teacher at the Music and Declamation Conservatory in Iași. When Păstorel was born, on July 30, 1894, she and her husband were still living at Dorohoi. Ionel (Ioan-Hipolit Teodoreanu) and Puiuțu (Laurențiu Teodoreanu) were his younger siblings, born after the family had moved to Iași. Osvald's father, Alexandru T. Teodoreanu, had previously served as City Mayor, while an engineer uncle, also named Laurențiu, was the first manager of the original Iași Power Plant. The Teodoreanus lived in a townhouse just outside Zlataust Church. They were neighbors of poet Otilia Cazimir and relatives of novelist Mărgărita Miller Verghy.

From 1906, Alexandru Osvald attended the National High School Iași, in the same class as the film critic and economist D. I. Suchianu. Young Păstorel had a vivid interest in literary activities and, critics note, acquired a solid classical culture. Literary historian Zigu Ornea, who spent time with Păstorel in the 1950s, cautions that, in addition to being a "jolly carouser", he was outstandingly educated in the classics, and could converse in Old French. The final two years of his schooling were spent at Costache Negruzzi National College, where he eventually graduated. He became friends with a future literary colleague, Demostene Botez, with whom he shared lodging at the boarding school. Years later, in one of his reviews for Botez's books, Teodoreanu confessed that he once used to steal wine from Botez's own carboy. Botez himself recalled that Păstorel would leave him endearing notes confessing to his weakness, noting that such exchanges helped to strengthen their friendship. He recalled that all three Teodoreanu brothers were outstanding and well-loved as boys, but also that Păstorel had made one enemy—his mathematics professor, the subject of his pranks and innuendo.

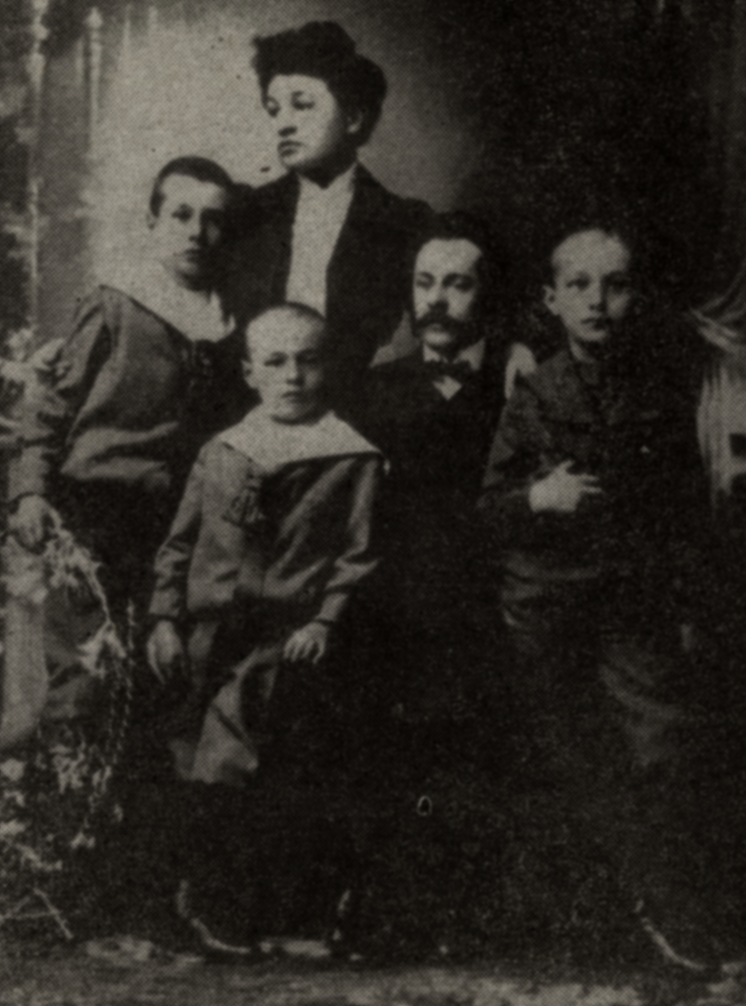
Osvald and Sonia Teodoreanu with their three sons (left to right): Păstorel, Puiuțu, and Ionel Teodoreanu

In 1914, just as World War I broke out elsewhere in Europe, he was undergoing military training at a Moldavian cadet school, leading him to graduate from the Artillery School of Bucharest in 1916. Over the following months, Osvald Teodoreanu became known for his support of prolonged neutrality, which set the stage for a minor political scandal. When, in 1916, Romania joined the Entente Powers, Alexandru was mobilized, a Sub-lieutenant in the 24th artillery regiment, Romanian Land Forces. He had just published his first poem, a sonnet of unrequited love, uncharacteristic for his signature writing. As he recalled, his emotional father accompanied him as far west as the army would allow.

According to Botez, the war only helped to bolster Păstorel's "Quixotic irreverence toward life and its cruelties". The future writer saw action in the Battle of Transylvania: on August 25, 1916, he was in Toplița, confessing in a rhyming letter that he was always "drink[ing] like a Cossack", even when commanding his troops. He eventually withdrew during The Romanian Debacle, escaping with the defeated armies into besieged Moldavia. His fighting earned him the Star of Romania and the rank of Captain. Meanwhile, Puiuțu Teodoreanu volunteered for the French Air Force and died in April 1918. During the same interval, Ionel, still in Iași, fell in love with Ștefana "Lily" Lupașcu, who became his wife. She was half French, and, through her, the Teodoreanus became cousins in law of Cella and Henrieta Delavrancea (orphaned daughters of writer Barbu Ștefănescu Delavrancea); and of Stéphane Lupasco, the French philosopher.

In 1919, upon demobilization, Alexandru returned to Iași. Like Ionel, he became a contributor to the magazines Însemnări Literare and Crinul, and also proofread for the former. Though he enjoyed an expensive lifestyle, he still had no steady income, and reportedly depended on his family, and especially his mother, for his material needs. At the time, he openly provoked his fellow citizens, who mocked for not having enough funds to entertain girls, by taking a britzka ride throughout the city, leaving his legs and hands to hang out; he then placed women's shoes on his hands, to make it appear that he was having public intercourse.

Păstorel eventually took a law degree from Iași University, and, in 1920, moved to the opposite corner of Romania, employed by the Turnu Severin Courthouse. He only spent a few months as a magistrate. Before the end of the year, he relocated to Cluj, where Cezar Petrescu employed him as a staff writer for his literary magazine, Gândirea. The group's activity was centered on Cluj's New York Coffeehouse. Together with another Gândirea author, Adrian Maniu, Teodoreanu wrote the fantasy play Rodia de aur ("Golden Pomegranate"). It was published by the Moldavian cultural tribune, Viața Românească, and staged by the National Theater Iași in late 1920. Some months later, Teodoreanu was co-opted by theatrologist Ion Marin Sadoveanu into the Poesis literary salon, whose members militated for modernism.

=== Țara Noastră period ===
In short while, Al. O. Teodoreanu became a popular presence in literary circles, and a famous bon viveur. The moniker Păstorel, candidly accepted by Teodoreanu, was a reference to these drinking habits: he was said to have "tended" (păstorit) the rare wines, bringing them to the attention of other culinary experts. His first contribution to food criticism was published by Flacăra on December 31, 1921, with the title Din carnetul unui gastronom ("From a Gastronomer's Notebook"). He is said to have been uniquely well-acquainted with French cuisine, having read all its relevant guides—from Joseph Berchoux to Brillat-Savarin and Mapie de Toulouse-Lautrec. Teodoreanu integrated with the bohemian society in several cities, leaving written records of his drunken dialogues with linguist Alexandru Al. Philippide. At Iași, the Teodoreanus, including Ștefana, tightened their links with Viața Românească, and with novelist Mihail Sadoveanu; Păstorel greatly admired the group's doyen, critic Garabet Ibrăileanu. A visitor, modernist poet-critic Felix Aderca, reported seeing Păstorel at Viața Românească, "plotting" against the National Theater Bucharest, because, unlike the nationalist theatrical companies of Iași, it only rarely staged Romanian plays. Aderca's antagonistic remarks, published in Sburătorul, reflected growing tensions between the modernist circles in Bucharest and the cultural conservatives in Iași. Visiting Bucharest in or around 1923, Păstorel met Aderca at Casa Capșa restaurant; the resulting fistfight was only interrupted by the intervention of a bystander, Ilarie Voronca.

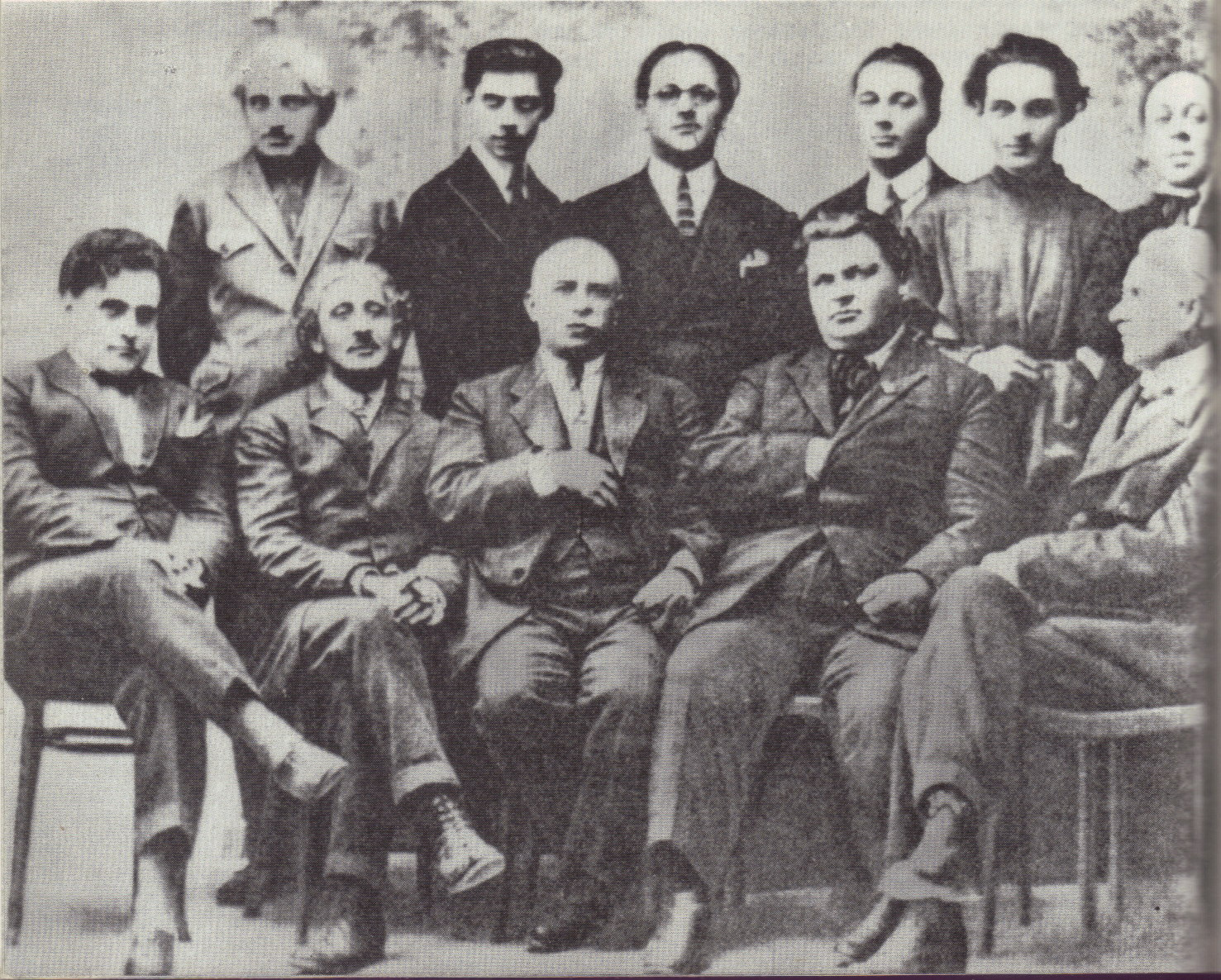
Romanian writers visiting Fălticeni in 1923. Păstorel is pictured top row, third from the right, between his brother Ionel (second from the right) and Ion Marin Sadoveanu. Seated directly in front of them is Mihail Sadoveanu

Bibliographers list the one-act comedy V-a venit numirea ("Your Appointment Has Been Received"), written in 1922, as Teodoreanu's only solo work as a playwright; he is known to have published another "sketch drama", eponymnously known as Margareta Popescu. This was taken up in 1928 by Bilete de Papagal, an experimental literary newspaper managed by poet Tudor Arghezi, with whom he toured Moldavian towns in an anti-tuberculosis awareness campaign. In 1923, he published his "Inscriptions on a Coffeehouse Table" in the satirical magazine Hiena, which was edited by Gândirea's Pamfil Șeicaru. While receiving his first accolades as a writer, Păstorel was becoming a sought-after public speaker. Together with Gândirea's other celebrities, he toured the country and gave public readings from his works (1923). He also made an impact with his welcome speech for Crown Princess Ileana and her "Blue Triangle" Association of Christian Women. The address culminated in a polite pun: "I finally understood that the Blue Triangle is not a circle, but a sum of concentric circles, whose center is Mistress Ileana, and whose radius reaches into our hearts."

Teodoreanu was also involved in the cultural and political quarrels of postwar Greater Romania, taking the side of newcomers from Transylvania, who criticized the country's antiquated social system; they proposed an "Integral nationalism". In January 1925, Păstorel began writing for the Transylvanian review Țara Noastră and became, together with Octavian Goga and Alexandru "Ion Gorun" Hodoș, its staff polemicist. In the mid-1920s, Păstorel's satire had found its main victim: Nicolae Iorga, the influential historian, poet and political agitator. According to Goga and Hodoș, Iorga's older brand of nationalism was unduly self-serving, irresponsible, and confusing. Teodoreanu followed up with satirical pieces, comparing the omnipresence of Iorga "the demigod" with the universal spread of novelty Pink Pills. He also ridiculed Iorga's ambitions in poetry, drama, and literary theory: "Mr. Iorga doesn't get how things work, but he is able to persuade many others: he is dangerous." Teodoreanu was courted by the modernist left-wing circles, which were hostile to Iorga's traditionalism, and was a guest writer for a (formerly radical) art magazine, Contimporanul. His mockery of Iorga was widely distributed at a time when his own father, Osvald, was chairing a regional chapter of Iorga's Democratic Nationalists. Teodoreanu Sr was consequently pushed to resign.

Păstorel's editorial debut came only later. In 1928, Cartea Românească publishers issued his parody historical novel, titled Hronicul Măscăriciului Vălătuc ("The Chronicle of Jester Harrow"). According to George Lesnea, a fellow poet and personal friend of Teodoreanu's, the book's history was intertwined with his growing disdain for Iorga. As noted by this source, Iorga had praised Sandu Teleajen for a similar parody, while lambasting Hronicul for "downgrading the Romanian language". Păstorel's Trei fabule ("Three Fables") were taken up by Bilete de Papagal, which also hosted his satirical advice column "for music lovers" (instructing them how to misbehave at concerts). While Teodoreanu expected Hronicul to be an inside joke for him and his friends, it was a national best-seller. It also earned him a literary award sponsored by the Romanian Academy. He made frequent appearances in Bucharest, for instance participating at the Romanian Writers' Society functions—in November 1926, he attended the banquet honoring Rabindranath Tagore, who was visiting Romania.

In 1929 the National Theater, chaired by Liviu Rebreanu, staged a new version of Rodia de aur. The event brought Păstorel into collision with the modernists: at Cuvântul, theatrical reviewer Ion Călugăru ridiculed Rodia de aur as a backward, "childish", play. The verdict infuriated Teodoreanu, who, according to press reports, visited Călugăru at his office, and pummeled him in full view. According to Curentul daily, he threatened onlookers not to intervene, brandishing a revolver. At Casa Capșa, where he was residing c. 1929, Păstorel was involved in another publicized squabble, throwing cakes at a table where Rebreanu sat together with the modernists Voronca, Camil Baltazar, and Ion Theodorescu-Sion. At the time, the Ilfov County tribunal received a legal complaint from Călugăru, who accused Teodoreanu of assault and repeated death threats. History does not record whether Teodoreanu was ever brought to court. Contimporanul also took its distance from Teodoreanu, who received negative reviews in its pages.

=== Gastronomice years ===
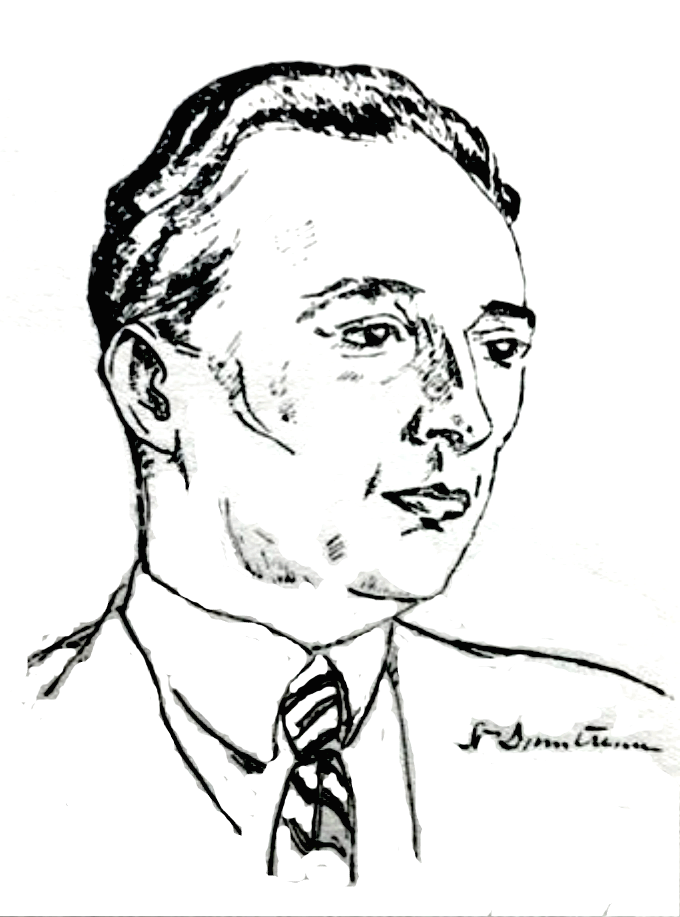
Ștefan Dimitrescu's portrait of Păstorel, published in Mici satisfacții (1931)

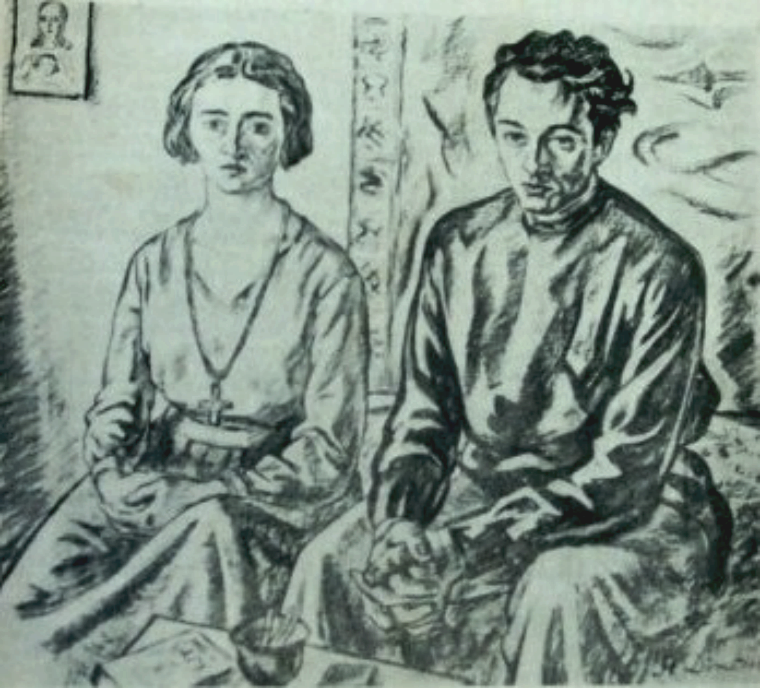
Ștefana and Ionel Teodoreanu in 1931, also by Dimitrescu

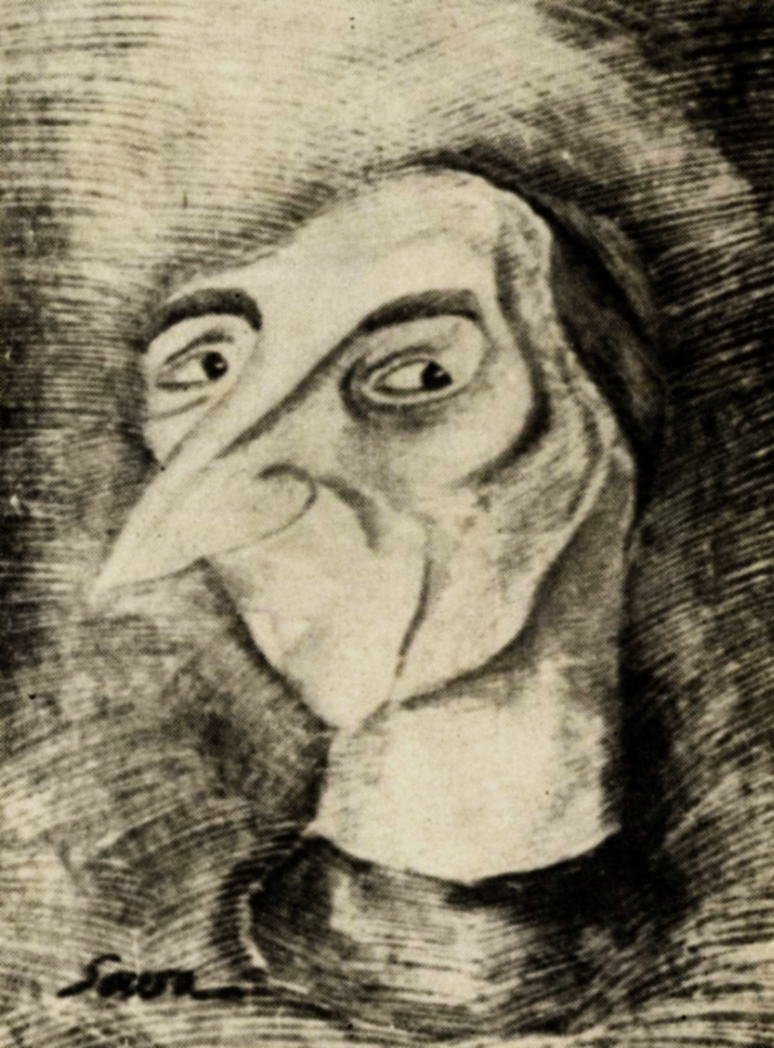
Caricature of Păstorel, by Ion Sava

Păstorel returned to food criticism, with chronicles published in Lumea, a magazine directed by literary historian George Călinescu, in Bilete de Papagal, and in the left-wing review Facla. He was involved in the dispute opposing Ibrăileanu to philologist Giorge Pascu, and, in December 1930, published in Lumea two scathing articles against the latter. By 1932, he had denounced Pascu to the local prosecutors, alleging that he had mishandled old manuscripts in his care. Pascu sued him for damages, this being one of several lawsuits in which the two men faced each other over time. Also in 1930, Teodoreanu joined the National Theater Iași directorial staff, where he supported the production of plays by Ion Luca Caragiale; his colleagues there were Moldavian intellectuals from the Viața Românească group: Mihail Sadoveanu, Demostene Botez, Mihail Codreanu, Iorgu Iordan. Like Sadoveanu and Codreanu, he was inducted into the Romanian Freemasonry's Cantemir Lodge. The formal initiation had an embarrassing twist: Teodoreanu turned up inebriated, and, during the qualifying questionnaire, stated that he was "damned well pleased" to become a Mason.

The volume Strofe cu pelin de mai pentru/contra Iorga Neculai ("Stanzas in May Wormwood for/against Iorga Neculai") was published in 1931, reportedly at the expense of Păstorel's friends and allies, since it had been refused "by all of the nation's publishing houses". However, bibliographies list it as put out by a Viața Românească imprint. The book came out just after Iorga had been appointed Prime Minister. According to one anecdote, the person most embarrassed by the Strofe was Osvald Teodoreanu, who had been trying to relaunch his public career. Osvald is said to have toured the Iași bookstores on the day Strofe came out, purchasing all copies because they could reach the voters; another version, favored by poet Ion Larian Postolache, is that the public itself made sure to buy it as soon as the shops opened, thus preventing the authorities from confiscating it. Postolache also recounts that Păstorel pulled an elaborate prank on Iorga and Osvald, announcing that he would show up at Iorga's home to deliver a public apology; he arrived late, pretended that he was in reality looking for a "Doctor Göldenberg", and left when told that he was in Iorga's home. Iorga then sued Păstorel for defamation, but gave up on his claim for compensation.

More officially, Teodoreanu published two sketch story volumes: in 1931, Mici satisfacții ("Small Satisfactions") with Cartea Românească; in 1933, with Editura Națională Ciornei—Rosidor, Un porc de câine ("A Swine of a Dog"). His work also included a translation of Alfred de Musset's play, Le Chandelier, used by Ion Sava in his stage production at Iași (1932). Around that time, he agreed to join the National Agrarian Party (PNA), out of respect for Goga, who was its chairman. Active for a while within the PNA's Iași section (which only had some ten members in all), he ridiculed its chairman Florin Sion, asking his party colleagues Sadoveanu and Ion Petrovici to take over; he eventually lost interest and quit the group. He had additionally had a running dispute with Lumea, and had rallied with the rival city newspaper, Opinia.

Eventually, Teodoreanu left Moldavia behind, and moved to Bucharest, where he rented a Grivița house. With help from the cultural policy-maker, General Nicolae M. Condiescu, he was employed as a book reviewer for The Royal Foundations Publishing House, under manager Alexandru Rosetti. He also became a professional food critic for the literary newspaper Adevărul Literar și Artistic, with a column he named Gastronomice ("Gastronomics"), mixing real and imaginary recipes. It was in Bucharest that he met and befriended Maria Tănase, Romania's leading female vocalist. Still indulging in his pleasures, Teodoreanu was living beyond his means, pestering Călinescu and Cezar Petrescu with requests for loans, and collecting from all his own debtors. Ibrăileanu, who still enjoyed Teodoreanu's capers and appreciated his talent, sent him for review his novel, Adela. Păstorel lost and barely recovered the manuscript, then, in his drunken escapades, forgot to review it, delaying its publication.

A collection of Al. O. Teodoreanu's lampoons and essays, of which some were specifically directed against Iorga, saw print in two volumes (1934 and 1935). Published with Editura Națională Ciornei, it carries the title Tămâie și otravă ("Frankincense and Poison"), and notably includes Teodoreanu's thoughts on social and cultural policies. The two books were followed in 1935 by another sketch story volume, eponymously titled Bercu Leibovici. In its preface, Teodoreanu announced that he refused to even classify this work, leaving classification to "morons and rubberneckers". The following year, the prose collection Vin și apă ("Wine and Water") was issued by Editura Cultura Națională. Also in 1936, Teodoreanu contributed the preface to Romania's standard cookbook, assembled by Sanda Marin. Osvald Teodoreanu and his two living sons participated in the grand reopening of Hanul Ancuței, a roadside tavern in Tupilați, relocated to Bucharest. The other members and guests were literary, artistic and musical celebrities: Arghezi, D. Botez, Cezar Petrescu, Sadoveanu, Cella Delavrancea, George Enescu, Panait Istrati, Milița Petrașcu, Ion Pillat and Nicolae Tonitza. Păstorel tried to reform the establishment into a distinguished wine cellar, and wrote a code of conduct for the visitors. The pub also tried to engender a literary society, dedicated primarily to the reformation of Romanian literature, and, with its profits, financed young talents. In April 1935, the club lost Istrati, with Păstorel representing the Writers' Society at his funeral.

The Hanul Ancuței episode ended when Teodoreanu was diagnosed with liver failure. Sponsored by the Writers' Society, he treated his condition at Karlovy Vary, in Czechoslovakia. The experience, which meant cultural isolation and a teetotal's diet, led Teodoreanu to declare himself an enemy of all things Czechoslovak. During his stays in Karlovy Vary, Păstorel corresponded with his employer, Rosetti, keeping with the events in Romania, but wondering if Romanians still remembered him. Upon his return, he was a recipient of the 1937 National Prize for Prose. The jury comprised other major writers of the day: Rebreanu, Sadoveanu, Cezar Petrescu, Victor Eftimiu. Teodoreanu was especially proud about this achievement: in his own definition, the National Prize was an endorsement "worth its weight in gold". He impressed the other literati at the celebratory dinner, where he was "dressed to the nines" and drank with moderation. After the event, Teodoreanu turned his attention to his poetry writing: in 1938, he published the booklet Caiet ("Notebook"). The same year, Ionel joined his older brother in Bucharest.

=== World War II and communist takeover ===
The Teodoreanu brothers were public supporters of the authoritarian regime instituted, in 1938, by King Carol II, contributing to the government propaganda. The king returned the favor and, also in 1938, Păstorel was made a Knight of Meritul Cultural Order, 2nd Class. In January 1939, both brothers joined the monarch's sole legal party, called "National Renaissance Front, as part of a mass recruitment among Writers' Society members. From autumn 1939, when the start of World War II left Romania exposed to foreign invasions, Teodoreanu was again called under arms with the 24th artillery regiment. His commanding officer, Corneliu Obogeanu, found him to be useless, and ordered him to stay behind in Roman (a town which Teodoreanu described as unhygienic and "not at all attractive"); though not in active service, he put on hold his regular food chronicles. In a letter to Rosetti, he noted that the only event of this second period under arms was the passage of refugees from Poland, who were fleeing the Nazi invasion. His military duties quickly dissolved into wine-drinking meals. This was attested by Corporal Gheorghe Jurgea-Negrilești, an aristocrat and memoirist, who served under Teodoreanu and remained his friend in civilian life.

In 1940, Teodoreanu worked with Ion Valentin Anestin, writing the editorial "Foreword" to Anestin's satirical review, Gluma, and published a series of aphorisms in Revista Fundațiilor Regale. He and Sadoveanu found additional employment at the Labor Ministry, as a councilor for the national leisure service, Muncă și Voe Bună. At around that time, the monarch personally obtained that Teodoreanu be allowed to inhabit a two-room apartment at his Royal Foundations. In September, Carol was ousted and the FRN dissolved, with the Iron Guard establishing a "National Legionary State". Upon taking over as Labor Minister, Vasile Iașinschi, had him immediately sacked; he also lost his state-owned domicile. A passing mention in the diaries of Mihail Sebastian informs that both Ionel and Păstorel had tried to appease the Guard, and were pressing to have Sadoveanu join its ranks (Sebastian partly attributes this account to Sadoveanu's daughter, Profira).

Returning to Bucharest, Păstorel stayed at Carlton Tower, until the building was destroyed in the November 10 earthquake; for a while, Teodoreanu himself was presumed dead. Shortly after, Romania, under Conducător Ion Antonescu, became an ally of Nazi Germany. In summer 1941, the country joined in the German attack on the Soviet Union (Operation Barbarossa). Teodoreanu took employment as an Antonescu regime propagandist, publishing, in the newspaper Universul, a panegyric dedicated to pilot Horia Agarici. Țara newspaper of Sibiu hosted his scathing anti-communist poem, Scrisoare lui Stalin ("A Letter to Stalin"). His brother and sister in law followed the same line, the former with novels which had anti-Soviet content. In one other context, Păstorel defended his colleague Lesnea, who was publishing translations from Sergei Yesenin and was therefore accused of being a communist.

In November 1941, the National Theater Iași hosted dramatized stories by Caragiale and Păstorel's commentaries, put together into a single play by Aurel Ion Maican. A second edition of Bercu Leibovici came out in 1942, followed in 1943 by a reprint of Caiet. Inhabiting a semi-basement in Dorobanți, Teodoreanu kept company with Jurgea-Negrilești. According to the latter, Păstorel had friendly contacts with novelist Paul Morand, who was the diplomatic representative of Vichy France in Bucharest. The story shows a high-strung Teodoreanu, who defied wartime restriction to obtain a bowler hat and gloves, and dressed up for one of Morand's house-parties. One of his stories was used for a variety show which opened in July 1943 at Colorado Theater, Bucharest. In December, the author was scheduled to go on a literary tour of Odesa, in the Romanian-held Transnistria Governorate, but never showed up for his train (allegedly, because he was "comatose" drunk). In mid-1944, at the peak of Allied bombing raids, Teodoreanu had taken refuge in Budești, a rural commune south of the capital. He was joined there by Maria Tănase and her husband of the time. In late June, he accompanied General Ioan Rășcanu to Oltenița, for a festival commemorating Romania's national poet, Mihai Eminescu.

After the August 23 Coup broke apart Romania's alliance with the Axis powers, Teodoreanu returned to regular journalism. His food criticism was again taken up by Lumea, and then by the general-interest Magazin. Lacking a stable home, he was hosted at The Royal Foundations Publishing House, and could be seen walking about its library in a red housecoat. At that stage, Romania was under a Soviet occupation, with only a marginal presence of other Allied armies. Returning to dine at Capșa with friends such as Henri Wald, Paul Georgescu, Mihail Petroveanu and Zaharia Stancu, Păstorel expressed his conviction that Sovietization was irreversible: nu le arde americanilor țara noastră, nici nu știu măcar unde suntem pe hartă ("the Americans couldn't care less about our country, they can't even locate us on a map"); Wald recalled the moment as one of comedic perfection since, just moments after, a US Army officer in a "superb uniform" entered the room, glanced around as if looking for someone, and left.

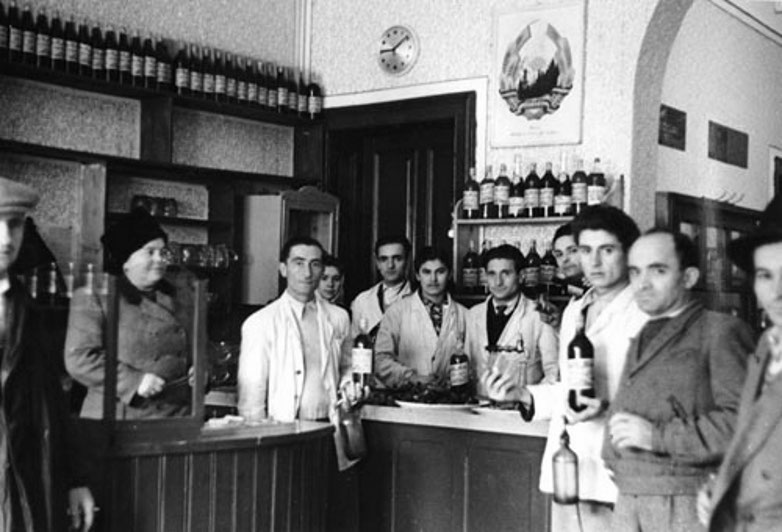
The restaurant section of a Romanian consumer cooperative, 1950

Though Rodia de aur was taken up by the National Theater Craiova in 1945, Teodoreanu's contribution to wartime propaganda had made him a target for retribution in the Romanian Communist Party press. Already in October 1944, România Liberă and Scînteia demanded for him to be excluded from the Writers' Society, noting that he had "written in support of the anti-Soviet war". Ionel and his wife also faced persecution for sheltering wanted anti-communists Mihail Fărcășanu and Pia Pillat-Fărcășanu. Păstorel's career was damaged by the full imposition, in 1947, of a Romanian communist regime. In May 1940, Teodoreanu had defined humor as "the coded language that smart people use to understand each other under the fools' noses". Resuming his food writing after 1944, he began inserting subtle jokes about the new living conditions, even noting that the widespread practice of rationing made his texts seem "absurd". Traditionally, his cooking recommendations had been excessive, and recognized as such by his peers. He firmly believed that cozonac cake required 50 eggs for each kilogram of flour (that is, some 21 per pound).

=== Censorship and show trial ===
The communists were perplexed by the Păstorel case, undecided about whether to punish him as a dissident or enlist him as a fellow traveler. Păstorel was experiencing financial ruin, living on commissions, handouts and borrowings. He tried to talk Maria Tănase into using his poems as song lyrics, and stopped seeing her altogether when her husband refused to lend him money. Sadoveanu, meanwhile, had emerged as a major figure in the politics and cultural life of the new communist state. The 1949 novel Mitrea Cocor consolidated Sadoveanu as an exemplary writer within the confines of Socialist Realism; however, persistent rumors suggest that it was in fact ghostwritten by Păstorel.

In 1953, aged 58 or 59, Păstorel married Marta Poenaru. Of roughly the same age as he, she was the daughter of a renowned surgeon, Constantin Poenaru Căplescu, and more distantly descended from architect Pierre Charles L'Enfant. Ionel Teodoreanu died suddenly in February 1954, leaving Păstorel devastated. In the aftermath, he assisted Ștefana with destroying Ionel's manuscripts, burning each individual page after first reading it. He compensated for the loss of his brother by keeping company with other intellectuals of the anti-communist persuasion. His literary circle, hosted by the surviving Bucharest locales, included, among others, Jurgea-Negrilești, Șerban Cioculescu, Vladimir Streinu, Aurelian Bentoiu, and Alexandru Paleologu. During communist celebrations such as Liberation Day, he would also hold meetings with other writers, including Vlaicu Bârna, Tudor Mușatescu, and Adrian Maniu (all of them pretended to watch the ongoing parade while in fact gossiping).

By 1954, Teodoreanu was being called in for questioning by agents of the Securitate, the communist secret police. Pressure was put on him to divulge his friends' true feelings about the political regime. He avoided a direct answer, but eventually informed Securitate about Maria Tănase's apparent disloyalty. While harassed in this manner, Teodoreanu was already earning a leading place in underground counterculture, where he began circulating his new anti-communist compositions. According to literary critic Ion Simuț, the clandestine poetry of Păstorel, Vasile Voiculescu and Radu Gyr is the only explicit negation of communism to have emerged from 1950s Romania. As other Securitate records show, the public was aware of Teodoreanu's visits to the Securitate, but distinguished between him, who was "called over" to confess, and those who made voluntary denunciations. Păstorel himself gave clues to his friends about his newfound discretion—when asked about his affairs, he would answer them: văzând și tăcând ("let's see about that and then shut up some more").

As recalled by Ornea, Teodoreanu was still struggling financially. He walked about town in "shabby clothes, though always with a smile and a joke blossoming on his cheek". As noted by researcher Florina Pîrjol: "the scion of bourgeois intellectuals, with his liberal values and his aristocratic spirit, unsuitable for political 'taming', Al. O. Teodoreanu had a rude awakening into a world where, perceived as a hostile element, he was unable to exercise his profession". In trying to salvage his career, he was forced to diversify his literary work. In 1956, his literary advice for debuting authors was hosted by the gazette Tînărul Scriitor, an imprint of the Communist Party School of Literature. He also completed and published translations from Jaroslav Hašek (Soldier Švejk) and Nikolai Gogol (Taras Bulba). In 1957, he prefaced the collected sonnets of Mihail Codreanu, and issued, with Editura Tineretului, a selection of his own prose, Berzele din Boureni ("The Storks of Boureni"). Samples of his communist-era works were read out at the Bucharest Literary Week in December of that year.

With Călinescu, Teodoreanu worked on La Roumanie Nouvelle, the French-language communist paper, where he had the column Goutons voir si le vin est bon ("Let's Taste the Wine and See if It's Good"). From 1957 to 1959, he resumed his food chronicles in Magazin, while also contributing culinary reviews in Glasul Patriei and other such communist propaganda newspapers. He was a virtual employee or "technical adviser" of Bucharest's Continental Restaurant, for which he wrote short poems that doubled as advertorials. Alongside Victor Tulbure and Mihai Beniuc, he gave poetry readings for the sporting staff of CS Dinamo București. According to literary reviewer G. Pienescu, who worked with Teodoreanu in the 1960s, the Glasul Patriei collaboration was supposed to grant Păstorel a "certificate of good citizenship". Under pressure from communist censorship, Teodoreanu was re-configuring his literary profile. Dropping all references to Western cuisine, his food criticism became vague, reusing agitprop slogans about "goodwill among men", before adopting in full the communists' wooden tongue. Although the country was still undernourished, Păstorel celebrated the public self-service chain, Alimentara, as a "structural transformation" of the Romanian psyche. Meanwhile, some anti-communist texts, circulated by Teodoreanu among the underground dissidents, were intercepted by the authorities. Those who have documented Teodoreanu's role in the development of underground humor note that he paid a dear price for his contributions.

On October 30, 1959, Teodoreanu was arrested, amidst a search for incriminating evidence. The Securitate relied on reports from its other informers, one of whom was Constantin I. Botez, the psychologist and academic. His manuscripts, including draft translations from William Shakespeare and a novel, were confiscated. The writer became one of 23 intellectuals implicated in a show trial, whose main victims were writer Dinu Pillat and the philosopher Constantin Noica. Although grouped together, these men and women were accused of a variety of seditious deeds, from engaging in "hostile conversations" to keeping company with Western visitors. One thing they had in common was their relationship with Noica: they had all attended meetings in Noica's home, listening to his readings from the letters of a banished philosopher, Emil Cioran. In Teodoreanu's specific case, the authorities also recovered a fable of his from the 1930s, where he was ridiculing communism as the rally-call of rebellious donkeys. His newer poems were also recovered through the testimonies of some who had heard them. The presiding judge, Adrian Dumitriu, asked Teodoreanu why he ever felt the need to contribute such works. Păstorel noted that it was impossible for him to stop: "chickens lay eggs, and I compose epigrams"; he also added: "if there's nothing else we can do [for our country], let's at least suffer for her sake." Wald also attributes him another quote, from his response to the judges: "I've been joking around for fifty years, and you gentlemen, of all people, had to take me seriously?"

=== Prison term, illness, and death ===
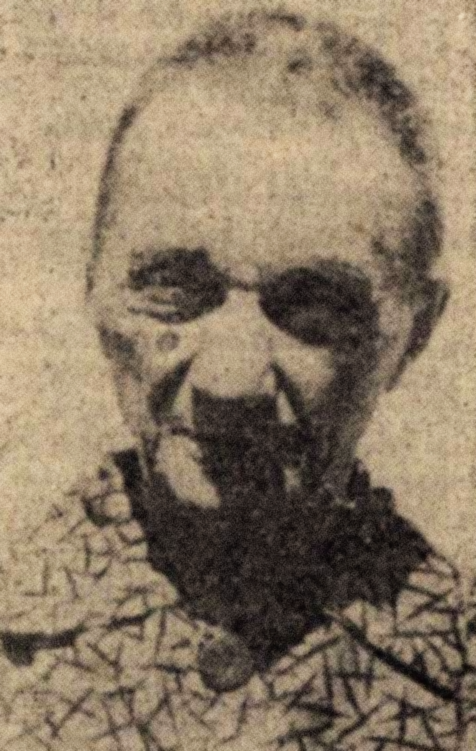
The aging and ill Teodoreanu, c. 1962

Teodoreanu received a sentence of six years in "correctional prison", with three years of loss of rights, and permanent confiscation of his assets. Communist censors took over his manuscripts, some of which were unceremoniously burned. These circumstances forced Marta Teodoreanu to work nights as a street sweeper. Held in confinement at Aiud Prison, Păstorel reportedly complained of having been brutalized by one of the guards. His much younger cellmate, Vasile Gavrilescu, recalls that Păstorel taught him and others to expand their cultural horizon beyond country affairs, advising them to prepare for an era of cultural openness. While in Gherla Prison, he filed an appeal: he admitted to having ridiculed communism, and to having distanced himself from Socialist Realism, but asked to be allowed a second chance, stating his usefulness in writing "propaganda". Sociologist Mihai Ralea, formerly of Viața Romînească, tried to obain a reprieve from the communist potentate Gheorghe Gheorghiu-Dej, who angrily rejected the plea and told Ralea: "Let him stay in". Reportedly, the Writers' Union, whose President was Demostene Botez, made repeated efforts to obtain Păstorel's liberation. He himself was not informed of this, and was shocked to encounter Botez, come to plead in his favor, in the prison warden's office.

Teodoreanu was ultimately granted a reprieve on April 30, 1962, together with many other political prisoners, and allowed to return to Bucharest. Later that year, he paid his friends in Iași what would be his final visit, the memory of which would trouble him to his death. Teodoreanu returned to public life, but was left without the right of signature, and was unable to support himself and Marta. In this context, he sent a letter to the communist propaganda chief, Leonte Răutu, indicating that he had "redeemed his past", and asking to be allowed back into the literary business. Păstorel made his comeback with the occasional column, in which he continued to depict Romania as a land of plenty. Written for Romanian diaspora readers, just shortly after the peak of food restrictions, these claimed that luxury items (Emmental, liverwurst, Nescafé, Sibiu sausages) had been made available in every neighborhood shop. His hangout was the Ambasador Hotel, where he befriended an eccentric communist, poet Nicolae Labiș. Helped by Pienescu, he was preparing a collected works edition, Scrieri ("Writings"). The communist censors were adverse to its publishing, but, after Tudor Arghezi spoke in Teodoreanu's favor, the book was included in the "fit for publishing" list of 1964.

Păstorel, having been diagnosed with lung cancer, was receiving highly invasive treatment, which cause him additional suffering. Writer Vintilă Russu-Șirianu, whose son was part of the hospital team, reports that Teodoreanu "always made efforts to ease things for his doctors", humoring them with his quatrains even moments after undergoing a bronchoscopy. In December 1963, he attended his final wine tasting at a cellar on Banului Street, in downtown Bucharest. Upon entering the terminal stages of disease, he was receiving palliative care at his house on Vasile Lascăr Street, in Bucharest's Armenian Quarter. Teodoreanu's friend and biographer, Alexandru Paleologu, calls his "an exemplary death". According to Paleologu, Teodoreanu had taken special care to render his suffering bearable for those around him, being "lucid and courteous". Jurgea-Negrilești was present at one of the group's last meetings, recalling: "At the very last drop [of wine], he got up on his feet... there was gravitas about him, a greatness that I find hard to explain. In a voice that his pain had made hoarse, he asked that we leave him alone".

Teodoreanu died at home, on March 17, 1964, just a day after Pienescu brought him news that censorship had been bypassed; in some sources, the date of death is given as March 15. Reportedly, death caught him reading volume sixteen of Ionel Teodoreanu's complete works. He was buried, alongside his brother, in the Delavrancea crypt at Bellu cemetery. Six hundred people were in attendance, but, owing to Securitate surveillance, the funeral remained a quiet affair. The Writers' Union was only represented by two former Gândirea contributors, Maniu and Nichifor Crainic. They were not mandated to speak about the deceased, and kept silent, as did the Orthodox priest who was supposed to deliver the service. The writer had left two translations (Anatole France's Chronicle of Our Own Times; Prosper Mérimée's Nouvelles), first published in 1957. As Pienescu notes, he had never managed to sign the contract for Scrieri. Without children of his own, he was survived by his sister in law Ștefana and her twin sons, and by cousin Alexandru Teodoreanu, himself a former, pardoned, detainee. Ștefana lived to age 97, and continued to publish as a novelist and memoirist, although from c. 1982 she withdrew into near-complete isolation at Văratec Monastery. The last-surviving of her sons died without heirs in 2006.

== Work ==
=== Jester Harrow ===
==== Common themes ====
Culturally, Teodoreanu belonged to the schools of interwar nationalism, be they conservative (Gândirea, Țara Noastră) or progressive (Viața Românească). Some exegetes have decoded proof of patriotic attachment in the writer's defense of Romanian cuisine, and especially his ideas about Romanian wine. Șerban Cioculescu once described his friend as a "wine nationalist" and George Călinescu suggested that Păstorel was entirely out of his element when discussing French wine. On one hand, Păstorel supported illusory claims of Romanian precedence (including a story that caviar was discovered in Romania); on the other, he issued loving, if condescending, remarks about Romanians being a people of "grill cooks and mămăligă eaters". However, Teodoreanu was irritated by the contemplative traditionalism of Moldavian writers, and, as Cioculescu writes, his vitality clashed with the older schools of nationalism: Nicolae Iorga's Sămănătorul circle and "its Moldavian pair", Poporanism. Philosophically, he remained indebted to Oscar Wilde and the aestheticists.

The frame story Hronicul Măscăriciului Vălătuc is, to at least some degree, an echo of "national specificity" guidelines, as set by Viața Românească. It is however also remembered as a most atypical contribution to Romanian literature, and, critics argue, "one of his most valuable books", a "masterpiece". Nevertheless, the only commentator to have been impressed by the totality of Hronicul, and to have rated Păstorel as one of Romania's greatest humorists, is the aestheticist Paul Zarifopol. His assessment was challenged, even ridiculed, by the academic community. The consensus is nuanced by critic Bogdan Crețu, who writes: "Păstorel may well be, as far as some care to imagine, peripheral in literature, but [...] he is not at all a minor writer."

According to Călinescu, Hronicul Măscăriciului Vălătuc parallels Balzac's Contes drôlatiques. Like the Contes, Jester Harrow's tale reuses, and downgrades, the conventions of medieval historiography—in Păstorel's text, the material for parody is Ion Neculce's Letopisețul țărâi Moldovei. As both the writer and his reviewers have noted, Teodoreanu mixed the subversive "counterfeiting" of Neculce's history into his own loving homage to the Moldavian dialects and their verbal clichés. Archaic Moldavian, he explained in a 1929 interview, was highly distinct from officialese; he related to it as "the language I used to speak, but forgot", the voicing of one's "deep melancholy". He specified his models: the Moldavian chroniclers, Neculce and Miron Costin; the modern pastiches, Balzac's Contes and Anatole France's Merrie Tales of Jaques Tournebroche. In addition, literary historian Eugen Lovinescu believes, Teodoreanu was naturally linked to the common source of all modern parodies, namely the fantasy stories of François Rabelais. Păstorel's "so very Rabelaisian" writing has a "thick, big, succulent note, that will saturate and overfill the reader". Ornea expressed his dissatisfaction with such views, arguing that Teodoreanu was primarily a narrator in the "Moldavian style", and, even there, an original one.

A narrative experiment, Hronicul comprises at least five parody "historical novels", independent of each other: Spovedania Iancului ("Iancu's Confession"), Inelul Marghioliței ("Marghiolița's Ring"), Pursângele căpitanului ("The Captain's Purebred"), Cumplitul Trașcă Drăculescul ("Trașcă the Terrible, of the Dracula Clan"), and Neobositulŭ Kostakelŭ ("Kostakel ye Tireleſs"). In several editions, they are bound together with various other works, covering several literary genres. According to biographer Gheorghe Hrimiuc, the latter category is less accomplished than the "chronicle". It notably includes various of Teodoreanu's attacks on Iorga.

==== Particular episodes ====
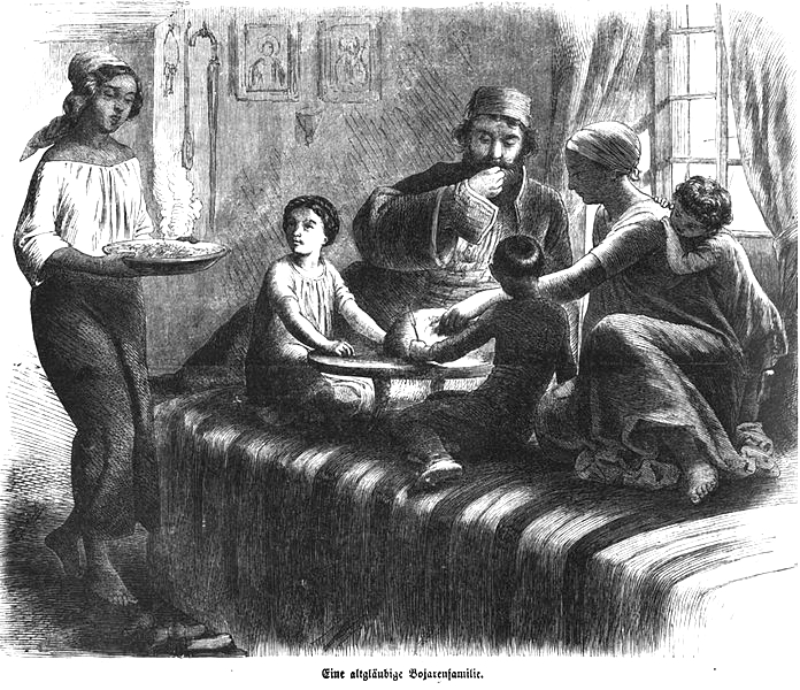
Domestic scene of boyardom in the Danubian Principalities (Die Gartenlaube, 1857)

Although the presence of anachronisms makes it hard to even locate the stories' time-frame, they seem to be generally referencing the 18th- and 19th-century Phanariote era, during which Romanians adopted a decadent, essentially anti-heroic, lifestyle. A recurrent theme is that of the colossal banquet, in most cases prompted by nothing other than the joy of company or a carpe diem mentality, but so excessive that they drive the organizers into moral and material bankruptcy. In all five episodes, Păstorel disguises himself as various unreliable narrators. He is, for instance, a decrepit General Coban (Pursângele căpitanului) and a retired courtesan (Inelul Marghioliței). In Neobositulŭ Kostakelŭ, a "found manuscript", he has three narrative voices: that of the writer, Pantele; that of the skeptic reviewer, Balaban; and that of the concerned "philologist", with his absurd critical apparatus (a parody of scientific conventions). The alter ego, "Harrow", is only present (and mentioned by name) in the rhyming Predoslovie ("Foreword"), but is implicit in all the stories.

Also in Neobositulŭ Kostakelŭ, Teodoreanu's love for role-playing becomes a study in intertextuality and candid stupidity. Pantele is a reader of Miron Costin, but seemingly incapable of understanding his literary devices. He reifies metaphoric accounts about a Moldavian Princedom "flowing with milk and honey": "Had this been in any way true, people would be glued to fences, like flies". Even the protagonist, Kostakel, is a writer, humorist and parodist, who has produced his own chronicle of "obscenities" with the stated purpose of irritating Ion Neculce (who thus makes a brief appearance within Harrow's "chronicle"). The deadpan critical apparatus accompanying such intertextual dialogues is there to divert attention from Teodoreanu's narrative tricks and anachronisms. Hrimiuc suggests that, by pretending to read his own "chronicle" as a valid historical record, Păstorel was sending in "negative messages about how not to decode the work".

Neobositulŭ Kostakelŭ and Pursângele căpitanului comprise some of Păstorel's ideas about the Moldavian ethos. The locals have developed a strange mystical tradition, worshiping Cotnari wine, and regarding those who abstain from it as "enemies of the church". The author also highlights the Moldavian boyars' loose sexual mores: weak husbands are resigned cuckolds, Romani slaves are used for staging sexual farces; however, as Zarifopol argues, this type of prose does not seek to be "aphrodisiac". Inelul Marghioliței depicts a boyar humiliating himself in front of his promiscuous young wife—according to writer Crișan Toescu, this stands as a symbol of his entire class. Some scenes of merrymaking are played out for a melancholy effect. In Neobositulŭ Kostakelŭ, the antagonist is Panagake, whom the other boyars detest. Kostakel exerts the collective retribution, by staging a situation in which he and a group of servants have intercourse with Panagake's wife. An outsider (Graeco-Romanian) and an usurper of tradition, Panagake suffers defeat and ridicule, but his very presence in the narrative announces the end coming end of universal joy. As critic Doris Mironescu notes, characters experience an "entry into time", except "theirs is not Great history, but a minor one, that of intimate disasters, of homemaking tragedies and the domestic hell."

Hronicul satirizes the conventions of Romanian neoromanticism and of the commercial adventure novel, or penny dreadful, particularly so in Cumplitul Trașcă Drăculescul. The eponymous hero is a colossal and unpredictable hajduk, born with the necessary tragic flaw. He lives in continuous erotic frenzy, pushing himself on all available women, "without regard as to whether they were virgins or ripe women, not even if they had happened to be his cousins or his aunts". Still, he is consumed by his passion for the nubile Sanda, but she dies, of "chest trouble", on the very night of their wedding. The broken Trașcă commits suicide on the spot. These events are narrated with the crescendo of romantic novels, leading to the unceremonious punch line: "And it so happened that this Trașcă of the Draculas was ninety years of age."

=== Caragialesque prose ===
Teodoreanu's Mici satisfacții and Un porc de câine echo the classical sketch stories of Ion Luca Caragiale, a standard in Romanian humor. Like him, Păstorel looks into the puny lives and "small satisfactions" of Romania's petite bourgeoisie, but does not display either Caragiale's malice or his political agenda. His own specialty is the open-ended, unreliably-narrated, depiction of mundane events: the apparent suicide of a lapdog, or (in Berzele din Boureni) an "abstruse" dispute about the flight patterns of storks. Another piece shows a patient decaying irreversibly, but enthusiastically, after a hack doctor prescribes him alcohol for a misdiagnosed illness. Alegeri libere ("Free Elections") was well-liked by the communist literary establishment for discussing electoral fraud under the defunct Romanian monarchy. Other texts are diatribes with "bewildering imprecations": "one single page bears 57 proper nouns, from Plato to Greta Garbo".

Un porc de câine pushed the jokes a little further, risking to be branded an obscene work. According to critic Perpessicius, "a witty writer can never be an obscene writer", and Păstorel had enough talent to stay out of the pornographic range. Similarly, Cioculescu describes his friend as an artisan of "libertine humor", adverse to didactic art, and interested only in "pure comedy". In his narrator's voice, Păstorel mockingly complains that the banal was being replaced by the outstanding, making it hard for humorists to find subject matters. Such doubts are dispelled by the intrusion of a blunt, but inspirational, topic: "Can it be true that mayweed is an aphrodisiac?" In fact, Un porc de câine expands Teodoreanu's range beyond the everyday, namely by showing the calamitous, entirely unforeseeable, effects of an erotic farce. The volume also includes a faux obituary, honoring the memory of one Nae Vasilescu. This stuttering tragedian, whose unredeemed ambition was to play Shylock, took his revenge on the acting profession by becoming a real-life usurer—an efficient if dishonorable way to earning the actors' fear and respect.

Critics have rated Teodoreanu as a Caragialesque writer, or a "Moldavian", "thicker", more archaic Caragiale. Hrimiuc suggests that Caragiale has become an "obligatory" benchmark for Teodoreanu's prose, with enough differences to prevent Păstorel from seeming an "epigone". Hrimiuc then notes that Teodoreanu is entirely himself in the sketch S-au supărat profesorii ("The Professors Are Upset"), fictionalizing the birth of the National Liberal Party-Brătianu with "mock dramaticism", and in fact poking fun at the vague political ambitions of Moldavian academics. As a Caragiale follower, Teodoreanu remained firmly within established genre. Doris Mironescu describes his enrollment as a flaw, placing him in the vicinity of "minor" Moldavian writers (I. I. Mironescu, Dimitrie D. Pătrășcanu), and noting that his "obvious model" was the memoirist Radu Rosetti. The other main influence, as pinpointed by literary critics, remains Teodoreanu's personal hero, Anatole France. In Tămâie și otravă, Teodoreanu is, like France, a moralist. However, Călinescu notes, he remains a "jovial" and "tolerable" one.

=== Symbolist poetry ===
Păstorel had very specific tastes in poetry, and was an avid reader of the first-generation Symbolists. Of all Symbolist poets, his favorite was Paul Verlaine, whose poems he had memorized to perfection, but he also imitated Henri de Régnier, Albert Samain and Jean Richepin. Like Verlaine, Teodoreanu had mastered classical prosody, so much so that he believed it was easier, and more vulgar, for one to write in verse—overall, he preferred prose. He was entirely adverse to Romania's modernist poetry, most notably so when he ridiculed the work of Camil Baltazar; even in his lyrical work of the 1930s, Teodoreanu recovered older, consecrated Symbolist synaesthesia and lyrical tropes, such as the arrival of autumn and the departure of loved ones.

In Caiet, he is also a poet of the macabre, honoring the ghoulish genre invented by his Romanian Symbolist predecessors. According to critics such as Călinescu and Alexandru Paleologu, his main reference is Alexandru Macedonski, the Romanian Symbolist master. Paleologu notes that Păstorel is the more "lucid" answer to Macedonski's unlimited "Quixotism". Together with the carpe diem invitation in Hronicul, Caiet is an implicit celebration of life:

Mormintele ne-așteaptă cu gurile căscate
Și mergem toți spre ele pe-un drum sau pe alt drum,
Cum merg hipnotizate gazele de fum,
Spre șerpi cu solzi de aur și ochi de nestemate.

Translation:

The graves they do await us, open crevasses,
And we head down to them, whichever road one takes,
To meet those golden-skinned and gemstone-inlaid snakes,
Hypnotized by them, inert, we are flue gasses.

Such themes preoccupied him again as he was dying of cancer, including in what may have been his last sonnet:

Peste milenii, poate că hîrca mea deșartă
Din pulberea rămasă din visul ei de artă
Să scoată la lumină printre scaieți un crin

A cărui mireasmă pe alții să desfete
Și numai doar atuncea voi fi trăit din plin
Murind a doua oară la sînul unei fete.

Translation:

Over millennia, who knows?, this skull that was so silly,
May hold in it the seed of an ambitious lily,
To spring out in the light, as if my dreams of art.

May then this head of mine in second-life be blessed:
Its fragrance as a flower may help it find some tart,
And with that die a second time, a lily on her breast.

Teodoreanu's contribution to Romanian poetry centers on an original series, Cântecèle de ospiciu ("Tiny Songs from a Hospice"), written from the perspective of the dangerously insane. As Călinescu notes, they require "subtle humor" from the reader. For instance, some veer into delirious monologues:

S-a ascuns în mine-un cal,
Rătăcit de herghelie,
Când îl adăpa, pe mal...
Însă nimenea nu știe
Că eu am în mine-un cal.

Translation:

There's this horse that's going free—
He was out drinking with his herd,
But now hides inside of me...
Still seems none but none caught word
About that, the horse inside me.

=== Scattered texts ===
Caricature of Nicolae Iorga, by Ion Sava

According to Ornea, Păstorel had an "inimitable charm", but much of his work could not be considered relevant for later generations. As a poet of the mundane, he shared glory with the other Viața Românească humorist, George Topîrceanu. If their jokes had the same brevity, their humor was essentially different, in that Topîrceanu preserved an innocent worldview. In this class of poetry, Teodoreanu had a noted preference for orality, and, according to interwar essayist Petru Comarnescu, was one of Romania's "semi-failed intellectuals", loquacious and improvident. As an impish journalist, he always favored the ephemeral. Păstorel's work therefore includes many scattered texts, some of which were never collected for print. Gheorghe Hrimiuc assessed that his aphorisms, "inscriptions" and self-titled "banal paradoxes" must number in the dozens, while his epigram production was "enormous".

In his attacks on Nicolae Iorga, the epigrammatist Păstorel took the voice of Dante Aligheri, about whom Iorga had written a play. Teodoreanu's Dante addressed his Romanian reviver, and kindly asked to be left alone. Anti-Iorga epigrams abound in Țara Noastră pages. Attributable to Teodoreanu, they are signed with various irreverent pen names, all of them referencing Iorga's various activities and opinions: Iorgu Arghiropol-Buzatu, Hidalgo Bărbulescu, Mița Cursista, Nicu Modestie, Mic dela Pirandola. Memoirist Vlaicu Bârna argues that Păstorel was needlessly inflammatory and cruel in pieces that attacked both Iorga's family and his public profile:

A supt țara sub trei regi
Și-are toți copiii blegi.

Translation:

He milked this country under three of its kings,
When all his own children are but dimwitted things.

In other such works, Teodoreanu took jibes at the National Peasants' Party (PNȚ), targeting Zaharia Boilă for his alleged corruption, and Iuliu Maniu for his indifference to it. On one occasion in 1928, he noted that the PNȚ was poised to "decapitate Mr Maniu", but took its time because "they cannot yet locate his head". On the friendly side, the fashion of exchanging epigrams was also employed by Teodoreanu and his acquaintances. In one such jousting, with philosopher Constantin Noica, Teodoreanu was ridiculed for overusing the apostrophe (and abbreviation) to regulate his prosody; Teodoreanu conceded that he could learn "writing from Noica".

Other short poems merely address the facts of life in Iași or Bucharest. His first ever quatrain, published in Crinul, poked fun at the Imperial Russian Army, whose soldiers were still stationed in Moldavia. A later epigram locates the hotspot of prostitution in Bucharest: the "maidens" of Popa Nan Street, he writes, "are beautiful, but they're no maidens". In 1926, Contimporanul published his French-language calligram and "sonnet", which recorded in writing a couple's disjointed replies during the sexual act. Teodoreanu's artistic flair was poured into his regular letters, which fictionalize, rhyme and dramatize everyday occurrences. These texts "push into the borders of literature" (Hrimiuc), and are worthy of a "list of great epistolaries" (Crețu). Călinescu believes that such works should be dismissed, being "without spirit", "written in a state of excessive joy, that confuses the writer about the actual suggestive power of his words".

=== Anti-communist apocrypha ===
Urban folklore and communist prosecutors recorded a wide array of anti-communist epigrams, attributed (in some cases, dubiously) to Al. O. Teodoreanu. In early 1947, the outlawed PNȚ was putting out leaflets featuring political satires of the new regime; PNȚ man Liviu Tudoraș argues that two such works were by Teodoreanu. Also then, Tudor Arghezi was circulating such pieces, mocking literary figures and communist heroes, for the amusement of his friends—including Ion Caraion. Păstorel is definitively known to have attacked communist literati—"destroy[ing]" the aspiring poet Marcel Breslașu with four lines which attacked his chosen pseudonym, and much later ridiculing the scholarly aspirations of Alexandru Piru. He is also the purported author of licentious comments about communist writer Veronica Porumbacu and her vagina, and about the "arselicking" communist associate, Petru Groza. The latter is also ridiculed in one piece which is more generically about government policies after the Soviet occupation of Romania:

Armistițiul ne-a impus
Să dăm boii pentru rus!
Ca să completam noi doza,
L-am trimis pe Petru Groza!

Translation:

The Armistice compelled our nation
To send oxen to the Russians!
Just to top the bill, I tell,
We sent them Petru Groza as well!

Other epigrams ridiculed the intellectual abilities of Groza's cabinet members, and especially the Minister of Agriculture, Romulus Zăroni:

Caligula imperator
A făcut din cal senator!
Domnul Groza, mai sinistru,
A făcut din bou – ministru!

Translation:

Caligula Imperator
Made his horse a senator!
Mister Groza, way more sinister,
Appointed an ox as minister.

Elsewhere, Păstorel asks listeners to answer him a riddle: who has failing grades for conduct in school "but holds sway over the country"? The prize for respondents is "20 years behind bars." One other piece, written after the Tito–Stalin split of 1949, alleges that Georgi Dimitrov had been murdered by the Soviets. Tradition also credits him with the corrosive joke about the Statue of the Soviet Liberator, a monument which towered over Bucharest from 1946:

Soldat rus, soldat rus
Te-au ridicat atât de sus,
Ca să te vadă popoarele
Sau fiindcă-ți put picioarele?

Translation:

Russian grunt, my Russian grunt,
Did they put you up higher
For all the nations to admire?
Or could it be that your feet stunk?

Elsewhere, Teodoreanu derided the communists' practice of enrolling former members of the fascist Iron Guard, nominal enemies, into their own Workers' Party. His unflattering verdict on this unexpected fusion of the political extremes was mirrored by co-defendant Dinu Pillat, in the novel Waiting for the Last Hour. Teodoreanu's famous stanza is implicitly addressed to "Captain" Corneliu Zelea Codreanu, the Guard's founder and patron saint:

Căpitane,
Nu fi trist!
Garda merge înainte
Prin partidul comunist!

Translation:

O Captain,
Be not sad!
Your Guardsmen are not yet dead:
Each one is a commie lad!

The political epigrams also record Teodoreanu's reception of the "Secret Speech", which marked the onset of De-Stalinization:

La Kremlin s-a dat semnalul
Și-am văzut c-așa stă treaba
Ani de zile, genialul
L-am pupat în fund degeaba!

Translation:

In the Kremlin they issued a call,
And so it is that we all
Got to see that The Genius was not.
What a waste it has been kissing his butt!

== In cultural memory ==
Păstorel Teodoreanu was made into a literary character in 1935, when Theodor Rășcanu serialized in Epoca a roman à clef. Called Promoția '907, it depicts him as "Ciobănel". With his constant networking, Teodoreanu shaped the careers of other writers, and, indirectly, left a mark on Romanian visual arts. Some of his works came with original drawings: illustrations by Ion Sava (for Strofe cu pelin de mai); a portrait of the writer, by Ștefan Dimitrescu (Mici satisfacții); and graphics by Ion Valentin Anestin (Vin și apă). One of the first to borrow from Hronicul was George Lesnea, the author of humorous poems about Moldavia's distant past and a recipient of the Hanul Ancuței literary prize. Teodorescu-like anecdotes, including one exploring an identical subject, were also published by his hunting companion, the magistrate Traian Ulea. At age twelve, long before he had met Păstorel, Alexandru Paleologu was writing epigrams modeled on Strofe cu venin—which he kept around, but never published. A young author of the 1940s, Ștefan Baciu, drew inspiration from both Gastronomice and Caiet in his own humorous verse.

In the late 1960s, when liberalization touched Romanian communism, most restrictions on Teodoreanu's work were lifted. In July 1969, the Prosecutor General filed appeals for both Teodoreanu and Vladimir Streinu, effectively ensuring their rehabilitation; during this procedure, the authorities claimed that Teodoreanu's epigrams had been burned in 1960, and, as such, that any definitive evidence of wrongdoing had been lost before the author's prosecution. Editura Tineretului had by then published a volume called Hronicul Măscăriciului Vălătuc, which in fact sampled much of his lifetime work, while leaving out most of the mock-historical texts. Scholar Marcel Duță gave a poor review to this "minuscule anthology", noting that it had failed to underscore Păstorel's cultural relevance.

1972 was a breakthrough year in Teodoreanu's recovery, with a selection of his poems and a new edition of Hronicul; the latter was to become "the most readily reedited" Teodoreanu work, down to 1989. Prefacing the former, D. I. Suchianu noted with pessimism that "those who understood [Teodoreanu] are all pretty much dead"; at the time, Păstorel's political works were still not publishable, and a full corpus of writings was therefore impossible. At that stage, Teodoreanu's non-political work was being used as an inspiration by a young poet, Cezar Ivănescu. Later communism only brought a bibliophile edition of Păstorel's Gastronomice, with drawings by Done Stan, and a selection of food criticism, De re culinaria ("On Food"); in 1974, a manuscript called Inter pocula was being reviewed for publishing by Editura Dacia. Gastronomice is said to have been an instant best-seller, with almost all of its 35,000 copies sold within months. In 1988, at Editura Sport-Turism, critic Mircea Handoca published a travel account and literary monograph: Pe urmele lui Al. O. Teodoreanu-Păstorel ("On the Trail of Al. O. Teodoreanu-Păstorel"). Since 1975, Iași has hosted an epigrammatists' circle honoring Teodoreanu's memory. Known as "Păstorel's Free Academy", it originally functioned in connection with Flacăra Iașului newspaper, and was therefore controlled by the communist authorities.

After the Romanian Revolution of 1989 lifted communist restrictions, it became possible for exegetes to investigate the totality of Teodoreanu's contributions. Already in January 1990, critic Dan C. Mihăilescu observed that communist censors had created a "wineless Păstorel", part of a "retouched literary history". From 1994, he was periodically honored in his native city by the Vasile Pogor literary society. Though the Romanian Cultural Foundation put out an edition of Hronicul as one of a "forgotten books" series, other competing editions were already being sold in the early 1990s. His anti-communist apocrypha have been featured in a topical volume, edited by Gheorghe Zarafu and Victor Frunză in 1996, but remain excluded from the standard Teodoreanu collections (including one published by Rodica Pandele at Humanitas). Also, under the new regime, food writing was again a profession, and Păstorel became a direct inspiration for gastronomes such as Radu Anton Roman or Bogdan Ulmu, who wrote "à la Păstorel". As such, Doris Mironescu suggests, Teodoreanu made it into "a sui-generis national pantheon" of epigrammatists, with Lesnea, Cincinat Pavelescu, and Mircea Ionescu-Quintus. Formal public recognition came in 1997, when the Museum of Romanian Literature honored the Teodoreanu brothers' memory with a plaque, unveiled at their childhood home in Iași. A street in the industrial part of the city was also named after him. However, the Zlataust building was partly demolished by its new owners in 2010, a matter which fueled political controversies.
