= Pilet =

Pilet may refer to:

== Surname ==
- Camille Pilet (1926–1994), Swiss watch salesperson and cult member
- Gérard Pilet (1933-2011), French tennis player
- Hippolyte-Jules Pilet de La Mesnardière (1610-1663), French physician, poet and playwright
- Jacques Pilet (born 1943), journalist and creator of Swiss newspapers
- Louis-Marie Pilet (1815-1877), French cellist
- Marcel Pilet-Golaz, Swiss politician
- Paul-Émile Pilet, (1927-2005), Swiss biologist
- Patrick Pilet (born 1981), French racing driver

== Place names ==
- Rivière du Pilet, a tributary of Chigoubiche River, in Lac-Ashuapmushuan, Saguenay–Lac-Saint-Jean, Quebec, Canada

== See also ==
- Pillet
