= Pillat =

Pillat is a Romanian surname. Notable people with the surname include:

- Dinu Pillat (1921–1975), Romanian literary critic and writer, son of Ion
- Ion Pillat (1891–1945), Romanian poet

== See also ==
- Pillet
