= Lupașcu =

Lupașcu is a Romanian surname. Notable people with the surname include:

- Camelia Lupașcu, Romanian rower
- Daniel Lupașcu, Romanian football player
- Stéphane Lupasco, né Ștefan Lupașcu
- Ștefana Velisar Teodoreanu, née Maria Ștefana Lupașcu
