= George Lesnea =

Romanian poet and translator (1902–1979)

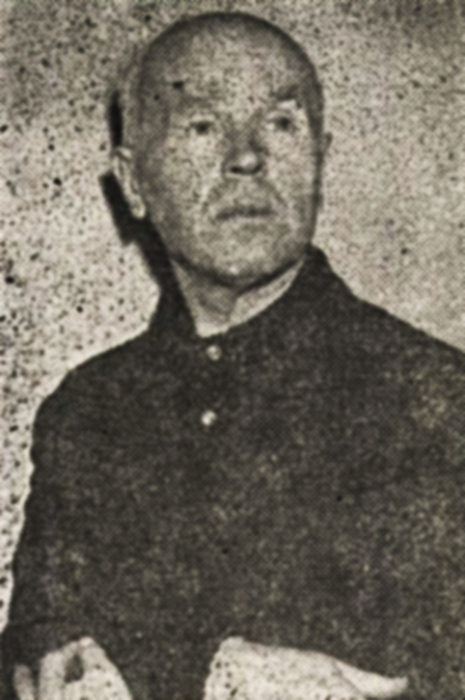
- Born: George Glod; March 25, 1902; Iași, Kingdom of Romania
- Died: July 6, 1979 (aged 77)
- Occupations: Poet; translator
- Parent(s): Iosif Glod; Maria Glod

George Lesnea (born George Glod; March 25, 1902 – July 6, 1979) was a Romanian poet and translator. He is known to have written praises of Carol II of Romania, Ion Antonescu, Nicolae Malaxa, as well as of the Romanian Communist Party and Nicolae Ceaușescu.

Born in Iași, his parents were the cart driver Iosif Glod and his wife Maria. His education consisted of primary school in his native city. His positions included bricklayer, typesetter at the printing press of Viața Românească magazine, librarian at the local bar association and president of the city's Romanian Writers' Union chapter. His first published poem, "Din adâncuri", appeared in 1922 in the Iași-based Gândul nostru magazine. With the help of writers Sandu Teleajen and Ionel Teodoreanu, he rose to prominence within the Viața Românească circle, contributing there from 1929. His poems appeared in Bilete de Papagal, Gândirea, Cuvântul liber, Cadran, Manifest and Însemnări ieșene. Leasnea's poems are traditional in style, evocative historic pastels marked by liveliness and a frenetic use of metaphor. His volumes of poetry include Veac tânăr (1931), Poezii (1938), Argint (1938) and Cântece de noapte (1979). He translated Sergei Yesenin, Alexander Pushkin, Sergey Mikhalkov and Mikhail Lermontov. In particular, his Yesenin translations were widely reviewed by critics and proved successful with the public. In 1934, he won the Romanian Academy prize, followed by the Romanian Writers' Society prize in 1940 and the State Prize for translation in 1957.
