= Bilete de Papagal =

Romanian left-wing publication

Bilete de Papagal was a Romanian left-wing publication edited by Tudor Arghezi, begun as a daily newspaper and soon after issued as a weekly satirical and literary magazine. It was published at three different intervals: 1928–1930, 1937–1938, 1944–1945.

== Name ==
The title made reference to a once-popular form of busking and fortune telling, one involving a person playing a barrel organ while a trained parrot would pick up predictions written on scraps of folded paper that were placed in an open box (the notes were known as bilete de papagal - "parrot tickets"). The use implied a very small format; Arghezi, who later adopted the bilet as an original form of short prose, explained his style choices in the editorial for the first issue (2 February 1928):

"A newspaper this small has never before been published, not even among ants. Lacking a large newspaper in which to write important stupidities, the editor of this rolling paper gives light to what is less than a flyer and confines himself to publishing grinning tidbits."

In 1929, Demostene Botez wrote:

"Having the rectangular and slender format of a restaurant menu, Bilete de Papagal has signified, for more than a year, day by day, the purest literary manifestation."

== History ==
Bilete de Papagal accepted contributions from both traditionally-minded and modernist authors, partly reflecting Arghezi's own attitudes towards literature. While celebrating the classics of Romanian literature, it rejected the dominant nationalist school and especially its far right tendencies, rejecting especially the neo-Orthodox aesthetics developed by Nichifor Crainic's Gândirea, as well as Iron Guard mysticism.

Critical of Romania's royal dynasty, Bilete de Papagal was not published after King Carol II established his authoritarian regime, and was only issued again after the end of successive dictatorships for the larger part of World War II. It was, however, the basis for a similarly titled column in the newspaper Informația Zilei, contributed by Arghezi until 1943 - when it was banned by Ion Antonescu's government for publishing the virulent Baroane ("Thou Baron"), a satire of Nazi Germany's ambassador to Romania, Manfred Freiherr von Killinger (Arghezi himself was interned near Târgu Jiu). It ceased publication for a third and final time in 1945, after its editor was singled out as an adversary to the Romanian Communist Party (which was strengthening its grip on Romanian society during the Petru Groza government).

== Notable contributors ==
- Felix Aderca
- Mihai Beniuc
- Ion Biberi
- Geo Bogza
- Emil Botta
- Eugeniu Botez
- Otilia Cazimir
- Eugen Constant
- Nicolae Crevedia
- Ilariu Dobridor
- Benjamin Fondane
- Tiberiu Iliescu
- Eugène Ionesco
- Isaia Răcăciuni
- Mihail Sadoveanu
- Ionel Teodoreanu
- Păstorel Teodoreanu
- George Topîrceanu
- Andrei Tudor
- Ștefana Velisar Teodoreanu
- Paul Zarifopol

== See also ==
- List of magazines in Romania
