= Costache Negruzzi National College =

Coordinates: 47°10′22.9″N 27°34′10.2″E

- Colegiul Național „Costache Negruzzi"; Liceul Internat „Costache Negruzzi"

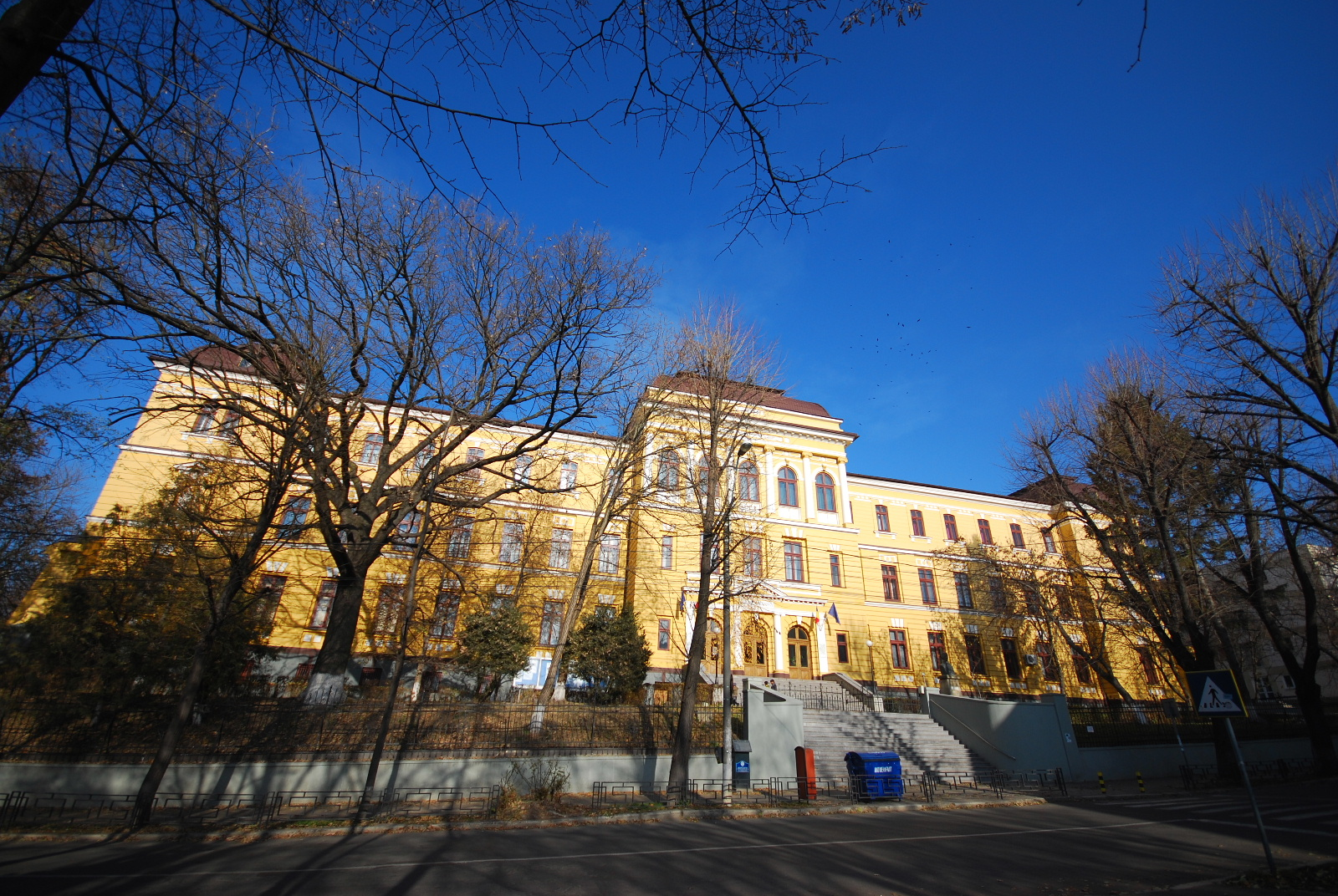

Location
- 4 Toma Cozma St. Iași; Romania

Information
- Type: Public, Day and Boarding Secondary School
- Motto: Prin noi, vei fi tu cel mai bun! (Through us, you will be the best!)
- Established: 3 October 1895
- Grades: 5–12
- Gender: Coeducation (All-boys initially)
- Age range: 10–19
- Enrollment: ca. 1,000
- Campus type: Urban
- Colors: White, blue
- Website: School web site

The Costache Negruzzi National College (Colegiul Național „Costache Negruzzi") in Iași is one of the most prestigious high schools in Romania. Founded in 1895 as the Boarding High School of Iași, it was named after writer and politician Costache Negruzzi.

== History ==
The Iași Boarding High School opened on 3 October 1895, following the initiative of Spiru Haret, who intended to establish a model high school. According to the school's official website, "the inauguration took place in an imposing building, one of the largest and most beautiful in Iași, which could be seen from afar, rising in the highest part of the city, on the shoulder of Copou Hill, in the middle of the gardens that surround it on all sides".

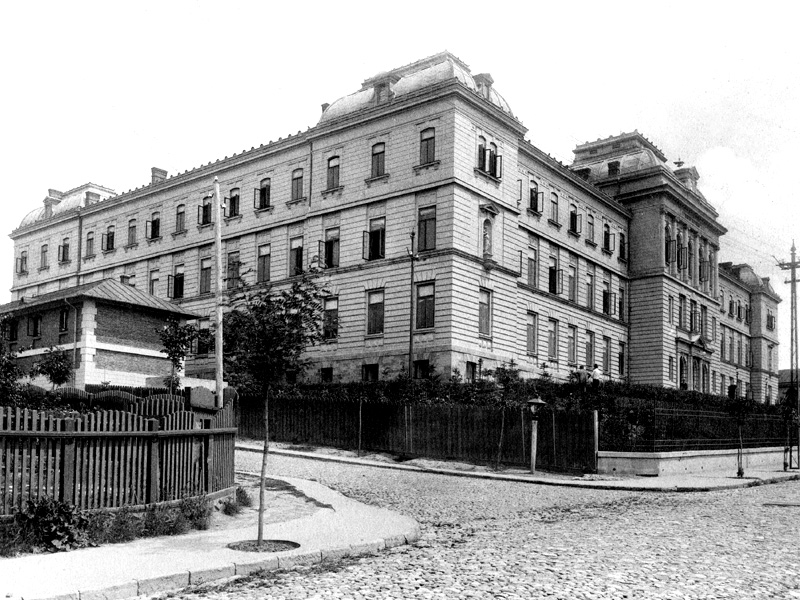
The "Costache Negruzzi" Boarding High School at the beginning of the 20th century

The high school was "to form a cultural elite", which is why teachers already noted for their professionalism and talent in several schools were recruited; at the same time, the most promising children were invited from all corners of the Old Kingdom and Transylvania.

Initially, the high school had a single, generalist profile. Following the adoption of the 1898 Law on Secondary and Higher Education (the "Spiru Haret" Law), two sections were introduced: Classical and Modern. A third section was established in 1911. On 22 June 1899, a decree was signed by which the institution would bear the name Liceul Internat "Costache Negruzzi". In 1902, the first seven-grade class graduated, and in 1904 the first eight-grade class.

In the decades following World War II, the educational process suffered as a result of the imposition of the Soviet model, characterized by the reduction to 10 grades, modifications to the curricula, and attempts, especially in the 1950s, to suppress authentic national values. The high school, viewed as the exponent of the so-called "bourgeois elite", was subject to political pressure on teachers, through forced replacements and secondments, and the abolition of a particularly valuable library of approximately 10,000 volumes in 1954. During the Stalinist period, the name of the high school was changed several times, becoming "Boys' High School No. 2" (1949–1952), "10-Year School No. 2 for Boys" (1952–1954) and "Secondary School No. 2 for Boys" (1954–1956).

However, the same author notes, "despite the political interference in the 1950s, the high school maintained its prestige and the boarding spirit was not lost, through the efforts and exemplary dedication of the teachers and students who honored its name". In 1956, the high school (partially) regained its name of Liceul de băieți nr. 2 (1949–1952), "Școala de 10 ani nr. 2 de băieți "Costache Negruzzi", and since 1977, Liceul de matematică-fizică "Costache Negruzzi".

In the 1990s, the high school returned to its original name, reclaiming and consolidating its former status as a prominent institution of education in Iași. In 1998, it became Colegiul "Costache Negruzzi". In 2010 it obtained the title of "European School", and since 2015, it has been called Colegiul Național "Costache Negruzzi", Iași.

== Notable staff and alumni ==
Staff
- Aron Densușianu
- Axinte Frunză
- Nicolae Gane
- Spiru Haret
- Calistrat Hogaș
- Dragomir Hurmuzescu
- Garabet Ibrăileanu
- Gavriil Musicescu
- Ion Ralet
Alumni
- Viorel Barbu
- Ioan Borcea
- Demostene Botez
- Radu Beligan
- Eremia Grigorescu
- Nicolae Hortolomei
- Horia Hulubei
- Garabet Ibrăileanu
- Eleny Ionel
- Iorgu Iordan
- Traian Lalescu
- Eugen Lovinescu
- Simion Mehedinți
- Ion Negrescu
- Victor Ion Popa
- Prince Radu of Romania
- Mihai Ralea
- Victor Spinei
- D. I. Suchianu
- Alexandru Teodoreanu
- Ionel Teodoreanu
- Constantin C. Teodorescu
- Mihai Răzvan Ungureanu

== Valedictorians ==
Published on the official website until 2017.

Year	Valedictorian(s)
1896	Teodoru Ioan
1897	Mladovici Cristea, Borcea Ioan
1898	Vasiliu Haralamb
1899	Lovinescu Eugen
1900	Lalescu Traian
1901	Botez Nicolae, Ciucă Mihai
1902	Ionescu Constantin, Enescu Ioan, Lupu Nicolae
1903	Teodor G. Enric
1905	Iftodiu Mihai, Dorneanu Gheorghe
1906	Zotta Gheorghe
1907	Stepleanu Vasile, Săvulescu Traian
1908	Iordan Iorgu
1909	Alexandrescu Constantin, Jora Mihai
1910	Ioan Nicolae
1911	Pavelescu Petru
1912	Carp Alexandru, Zamfir Dimitrie, Botez Demostene
1913	Moroianu Alexandru
1914	Ivănescu Teodor, Popa I. Victor
1915	Popa I. Nicolae, Hulubei Horia, Ralea Mihai, Suchianu Dumitru
1916	Ionașcu Traian, Atanasiu Constantin, Balmuș Constantin, Bărăgăoanu Gheorghe, Dămăceanu Dumitru, Teodoreanu Ionel
1919	Tofan Simeon
1920	Friedman Jean
1921	Răuț Emil, Ștefănescu-Goangă Petru, Dimitriu Ermil, Gogan Ion
1922	Conea Ioan, Manea Gheorghe, Burghele Theodor
1923	Receanu Ioan
1924	Bogdan Gheorghe
1925	Teodorescu Nicolae
1926	Popovici Constantin
1927	Pușcă Toma, Popa Ilie
1928	Gavrileț Frenț, Bratu Alfred, Bârlădeanu Alexandru
1929	Nedelschi Gheorghe
1930	Niculescu Constantin, Vasilescu Semproniu
1931	Bucur Dimitrie
1932	Manoliu Constantin
1933	Bădărău Gheorghe
1934	Bălan Aurel
1936	Andriescu-Gale Bogdan
1937	Beligan Radu
1938	Curievici Ioan
1939	Sava Victor
1940	Cerchez Eugen
1941	Berechet Mircea
1942	Ilarion Florin
1943	Climescu Eugen
1944	Ionescu Sorin
1945	Dohotaru Corneliu
1946	Dolinescu Constantin
1947	Leonte Liviu
1948	Murariu Dumitru
1949	Constantinescu Florin
1950	Rener Alexandru
1951	Burlacu Ștefan
1952	Gafițeanu Mihai
1953	Amariței Constantin
1954	Timpoc Dinu, Brănișteanu D.
1955	Munteanu Petru Dan
1956	Dănila Marcel Gheorghe
1957	Ungureanu Alexandru
1959	Nanu Gheorghe Octav
1960	Anghel Mircea
1961	Mărculescu Alexandru Sorin
1962	Antonescu Mihai
1963	Caransievici Eugen
1964	Pârvu Constantin-Sorin
1965	Gheorghiu Virgil
1966	Aizicovici Sergiu, Goraș Liviu
1967	Popa Eugen, Iacob Florin
1969	Vescan T. Zeno, Focșa V. Gabriela Maria
1970	Vescan T. Robert
1971	Crulicovschi P. Adriana Lucia
1972	Tiba I. Dan
1973	Stan V. Iulia
1974	Hăvârneanu Teodor Dumitru
1975	Zaharia I. Gheorghe
1976	Sârbu N. Adriana, Păstrăvanu E.D. Octavian Cezar
1977	Teodorescu Al. Bogdan, Oprea D. Doinița
1978	Anița I. Carmen, Vulcănescu GH. Iris
1979	Haimovici M. Iulian
1980	Lazăr M. Sorin, Măcincă T. Ioan
1981	Neaga N. Călin
1982	Poroșnicu V. Eduard
1983	Cruceanu Mihail
1984	Alexandru Dragomirna
1985	Covic Adrian
1986	Dediu C. Laura Luana
1987	Ungureanu Șt. Mihai Razvan
1988	Todirașcu D. Amalia, Năstase M. Adrian Laurian
1989	Gârtan M. Mihaela Atena
1990	Dascălu D. Cristina Gena, Dima T. Lucia Corina
1991	Grăjdeanu M. Radu Adrian, Vidrașcu Tr. Cristian
1992	Geba D. Dan Andrei, Siminiceanu I. Radu
1993	Ibănescu I. Mihai
1994	Lăcătușu M. Cristina Mihaela
1995	Cuvinciuc M. Victor, Hogea V. Vlad Gabriel
1996	Georgescu G. Roxana
1997	Ciubotariu C. Diana, Fratu A. Mihaela-Codruța
1998	Dascălu N. Ana-Maria, Rașcanu A. Anca-Irina
1999	Ilie Gh. Vlad-Ionuț
2000	Haivas N.I. Irina-Elena, Grigoraş T.V. Raluca-Maria
2001	Vasilescu-Lohan M. Teodora, Gonța A. Cristina
2002	Banar C. Alexandru, Cârlescu A. Dragoș-Valerică, Baltariu F. Alina
2003	Rotariu C. Alexandra, Balahur-Dobrescu P.P. Alexandra, Boureanu R.C. Ioana
2004	Cârjă O. Oana, Iosub D. Daniela
2005	Iacob F. Theodor-Alin
2006	Hăvârneanu T.D. Raluca, Irimia V. Ana-Monica
2007	Martinuș I. Antoaneta-Luciana
2008	Baibarac M. Arina Cristina
2009	Airimițoaie S. Andrei, Artenie R. Georgiana, Costea I. Ramona, Daneliuc A. Ana Maria, Luchian H. Alexandra, Vieriu C. Antonela
2010	Haraga G. Anca Elena
2011	Zamfir M. Ioana, Zoderu A. Andreea, Andriescu F. Gabriela, Chiriac D. Andra Mădălina, Dobri F. Mirona Letiția, Băean G. Maria Luiza, Popa F. Laura, Olariu S. Tudor, Cârlescu C. Flavia Elena
2012	Andrei L. Ioana, Antal P. Dorin Cristian, Condrea V. Daria, Crăciunescu L. Constantin Cosmin, Lozneanu C. Cezara Maria, Mihalache C. Ștefan Bogdan, Schreiner R. Thomas Gabriel, Stănescu R. Alexandra Mădălina, Postelnicu L. Leontina, Rotaru E. Ioana, Vîrlan C. Alexandra Mădălina
2013	Luchian C. Maria, Mărgineanu M. Antonia, Strungaru M. Mara-Ștefania
2014	Mărculeț V. Dan-Georgian
2015	Brănișteanu D.C. Cătălina Ioana, Ilău V. Marius Constantin
2016	Popa Delia Melania, Honcu Roxana Elena
2017	Niță Maria Elena, Timofticiuc Felicia

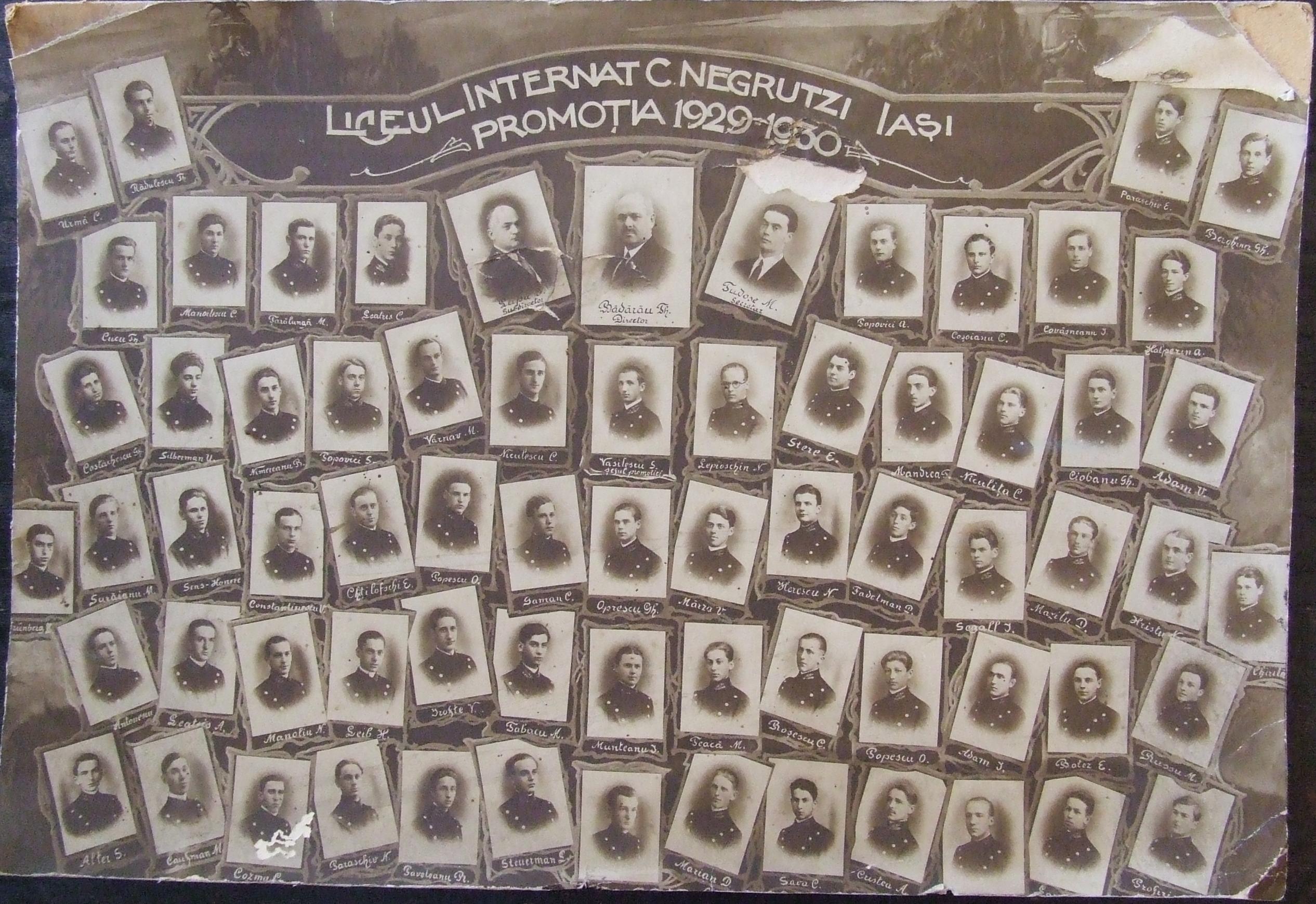
Class of 1930
