= Paul-Émile Pilet =

Swiss biologist

- Born: 26 July 1927
- Died: 12 December 2005 (aged 78)
- Citizenship: Swiss
- Scientific career
- Fields: Biology
- Institutions: Institut de biologie et de physiologie végétales de l'Université de Lausanne

Paul-Émile Pilet, (born in Lausanne 26 July 1927; died 12 May 2005 in Pully), was a Swiss biologist, professor and director of the Institute of Plant Biology and Physiology of the University of Lausanne.

== Biography ==
Son of William, architect, Paul-Émile Pilet studied physics and biology at the University of Lausanne, where he obtained a doctorate in science in 1951. After internships at the Faculty of Sciences in Paris and Bordeaux, at California Institute of Technology (CALTECH) in Pasadena (United States) and at Bedford College (London University), he returned to the country to pursue an academic career at the University of Lausanne: privat-docent from 1952, lecturer (1955), extraordinary professor (1958), then full professor from 1967 to 1992. - Director of the Institut de plant biology and physiology from the University of Lausanne; since 1965. - Visiting professor for the advanced studies diploma (DEA) in plant physiology at the Sorbonne; since 1980. - Visiting Professor at the Leicester Polytechnic (GB); since 1970. - Initiator of postgraduate courses in phytophysiology in French-speaking Switzerland; 1992. - Research Fellow at Osaka University (Japan). - From 1996, Research Visiting Professor at the De Montfort University (GB).

Pilet was interested in the theory and history of science, but especially in the physiology of plants, in particular in the regulation of growth by hormones in plant cells. Other biophysical processes, such as the influence of gravity on cells, also caught his attention.

Pilet belongs to many scientific commissions: Steering Committee of the International Journal of Methodology and Epistemology of Science Dialectica (since 1963), International Committee "Space Research: Gravitation Physiology", "Spacelab" program (since 1977); "Editorial Boards" of international biology journals, in particular "Plant Physiology" (Paris), "Plant Science Letters" Amsterdam), "Plan and Cell Physiology" (Osaka); International Union of Biological Sciences Commission for Gravitational Physiology; "Gallileo Foundation" (USA) for space bioresearch (1988); "Working group for biology" of the European Space Agency (ESA) (since 1989). Founding President of the Swiss Society of Plant Physiology (1962); 1964-1978 Secretary General of the "International Association of Plant physiologists" (IAPP); founding member of the "European Federation of Plant Physiology" (1975).

== Sources ==
Pilet (Paul-Emile) 1955-2005, Fonds: Pilet (Paul-Emile). Vaud cantonal archives.

== Bibliography ==
- Jean-Philippe Chenaux, "Biology and gravity - A Lausanne professor associated with the Spacelab program * The career of professor Pilet", Gazette de Lausanne, June 24, 1977, p. 3
- Olivier Robert; Francesco Panese (2000). University of Lausanne (ed.). Dictionary of professors of the University of Lausanne since 1890 (in French). Vol. XXXVI. Lausanne. p. 1433. ISBN 2-940304-00-9. "1009-1010"
- Obituary: Bulletin of the Vaudoise Society of Natural Sciences, 90, 2006, p. 113-115
