= Alexey Morozov =

Theoretical physicist

Alexei Morozov
- Born: November 2, 1961 (age 64); Moscow, Soviet Union
- Education: Moscow Institute of Physics and Technology, Institute for Theoretical and Experimental Physics
- Scientific career
- Fields: Theoretical physics
- Doctoral advisor: Lev Okun

Alexei Yur'evich Morozov (Russian: Алексей Юрьевич Морозов; born 2 November 1961 in Moscow) is a wide-profile theoretical physicist known for his interests and achievements in variety of subjects ranging from traditional particle physics to modern abstract field theory (string theory), knot theory, integrable systems and quantum algebra. In particular, he is one of the founders of perturbative string theory techniques and one of the discoverers of hidden symmetries in integrable quantum field theory models, mostly matrix models. Alexei Morozov has created a research group that gathered scientists from different Moscow institutes together.

== Education ==
- 1978–1984 – Moscow Institute of Physics and Technology
- 1986 – Candidate of Sciences (equivalent to PhD), Institute for Theoretical and Experimental Physics
- 1991 – Doctor of Sciences (equivalent to habilitation), Institute for Theoretical and Experimental Physics
- 22 May 2003 – elected as a corresponding member of the Russian Academy of Sciences (department of physical sciences, nuclear physics section)

He has been affiliated with the Institute for Theoretical and Experimental Physics since 1982. Currently he is working as a principal researcher there.

Alexei Yu. Morozov has written more than 250 original publications, including 2 monographies and several monographic surveys. His H-index is 46, with more than 7000 citations in total (Scopus, RSCI). He is a member of editorial boards of TMP, IJMPA and MPLA.
