= Demostene Botez =

Romanian poet and prose writer

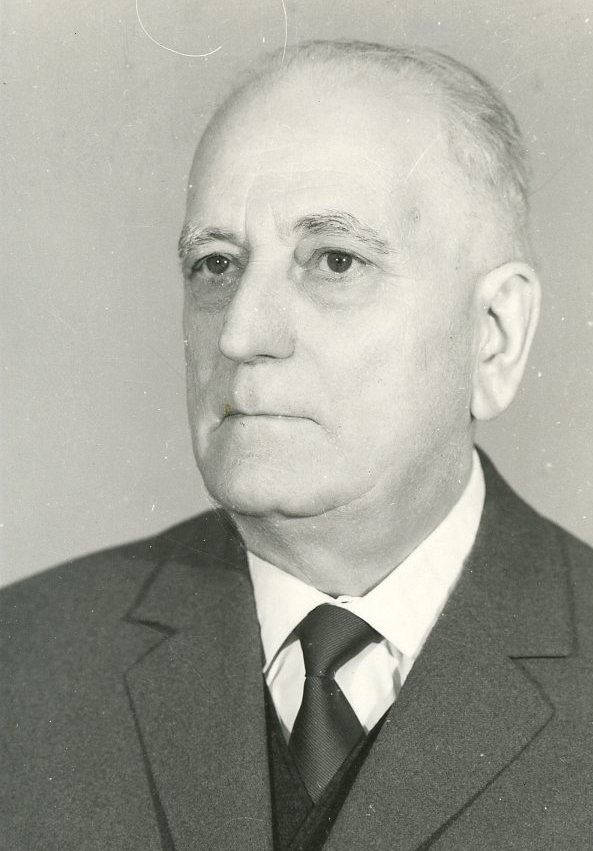
Demostene Botez

Demostene Botez (July 2, 1893 – March 18, 1973) was a Romanian poet and prose writer.

Born in Trușești (then called Hulub), Botoșani County, his parents were Anghel Botez, a Romanian Orthodox priest, and his wife Ecaterina (née Chirica), the daughter of a priest. After attending the first two grades of school in his native village, in 1900 he was sent to learn at Botoșani and later at Iași. There he was first a student at a private high school and then at the Boarding High School, from which he graduated in 1912. In 1915, he obtained a law degree from the University of Iași. He made his published debut in 1911, in the Iași-based Arhiva magazine. After seeing frontline action during World War I, he published the short poetry book Munții (1918), which was prefaced by Garabet Ibrăileanu and received the Romanian Academy's Adamache literary prize. He practiced law in Iași and in Bucharest for several decades, which allowed him to write in relaxed fashion without material cares.

While still a high school student, Botez entered the literary circle surrounding Viața Românească. In 1919, he briefly edited Însemnări literare magazine. During the interwar period, he wrote for the left-wing press on a consistent basis. The poems from his early books (Floarea pământului, 1920; Povestea omului, 1922; Zilele vieții, 1927; Cuvinte de dincolo, 1934; Pământ și om, 1942) combine idyllic, traditionalist touches with psychic states and Symbolist motifs. They are significant representatives of the sentimental side to Romania's Symbolist movement. His novels (Ghiocul, 1931; Înălțarea la cer, 1937) were written in a traditional style partly influenced by Fyodor Dostoyevsky.

After the rise of the communist regime, his themes fit the new authorities' line (Oameni în lumină, 1956; Bucuria tinereții, 1957; Carnet, 1961). His 1956 poetry book Curcubeu peste Dunăre reflected on Romanian-Bulgarian friendship, and the 1958 Prin ani included additional poems about Bulgaria and Czechoslovakia. Prin U.R.S.S. is a 1962 account of his Soviet travels. As a senior cultural figure, he was able to publish his late-1920s impressions of Marseille in a French review, and the verses in Carnet were inspired by a trip to Paris. His translations include Madame Bovary; during his vacations, he wrote memoir-type articles and children's literature. Botez was a member of the Assembly of Deputies and of the Great National Assembly, and from 1963 a corresponding member of the Romanian Academy. He served as editor-in-chief and later director of Viața Românească's new series. From 1964 to 1965, he was interim president of the Romanian Writers' Union.
