= Dinu Pillat =

Romanian novelist (1921–1975)

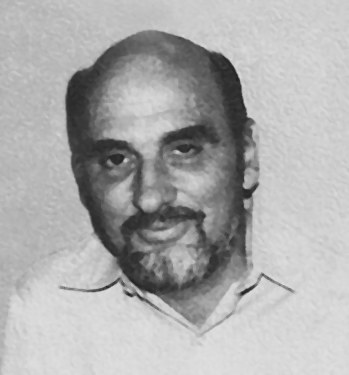
- Born: Constantin I. Pillat; November 19, 1921; Bucharest, Kingdom of Romania
- Died: December 5, 1975 (aged 54); Bucharest, Socialist Republic of Romania
- Education: University of Bucharest
- Occupations: Literary critic, prose writer
- Spouse: Cornelia Filipescu
- Children: Monica Pillat
- Relatives: Ion Pillat (father); Maria Pillat-Brateș (mother)
- Writing career
- Years active: 1938–1975

Dinu Pillat (born Constantin I. Pillat; November 19, 1921–December 5, 1975) was a Romanian literary critic and prose writer.

Born in Bucharest, his parents were poet Ion Pillat and his wife Maria (née Procopie Dumitrescu), a painter known professionally as Maria Pillat-Brateș. After attending Spiru Haret High School in his native city from 1932 to 1940, he enrolled in the literature and philosophy faculty of the University of Bucharest. He studied there from 1940 to 1944, specializing in modern philology. He obtained a doctorate in 1947, with a thesis on the sensation novel in Romanian literature during the latter half of the 19th century; his adviser was George Călinescu. However, the title of doctor was not conferred until 1968. In 1957, he became a researcher at the Literary History and Folklore Institute, which took on the name of the recently deceased Călinescu in 1965. His time there was interrupted in March 1959, when he was arrested and ensnared in a plot concocted by the communist regime's Securitate secret police. Together with Constantin Noica, he was charged with leading a conspiracy to distribute anti-regime propaganda. In reality, the alleged conspirators did not know one another, and the Romanian Communist Party wished to deliver a lesson to rising intellectuals. Sentenced to 25 years at hard labor and 15 years' imprisonment for treason, he was held at Jilava and Gherla prisons, where he suffered recurring bouts of tuberculosis. He was amnestied in July 1964.

Pillat's first published work appeared in Universul literar in 1938. His first novel, the 1943 Tinerețe ciudată, dealt with the love life and intellectual passions of high schoolers and university students. Moartea cotidiană (1946) is a novel that describes the banality of the petit-bourgeois existence, written from an Existentialist perspective. He resumed publishing in 1969, with a brief biography of Ion Barbu. Mozaic istorico-literar. Secolul XX appeared the same year. He edited and prefaced works by Barbu, Max Blecher and Ionel Teodoreanu. Pillat also published an anthology, O constelație a poeziei române moderne. This featured poems by his father and by Barbu, Tudor Arghezi, George Bacovia, Lucian Blaga, Benjamin Fondane, Adrian Maniu, Ion Vinea, and Vasile Voiculescu.

He and his wife Cornelia had a daughter, poet and philologist Monica Pillat.

== Works ==
- Ion Barbu (in Romanian). București: Editura Tineretului. 1969. OCLC 10305776.
- Mozaic istorico-literar secolul XX (in Romanian). București: Editura pentru literatură. 1969. OCLC 23578427.
- Dostoievski în conștiința literară românească: eseu (in Romanian). București: Cartea Românească. 1976. OCLC 3433147.
- Itinerarii istorico-literare (in Romanian). București: Editura Minerva. 1978. OCLC 5029244.
