= Pillet =

Pillet is a surname. Notable people with the surname include:

- Albert Dubois-Pillet (1846–1890), French Neo-impressionist painter and a career army officer
- Alexis Pillet-Will (1805–1871), French banker
- Blanche Edwards-Pillet (1858–1941), French physician, medical teacher and leading social reformer for women
- Charles Pillet (1869–1960), French sculptor and engraver
- François Pillet (born 1950), French politician
- François Benjamin Pillet, French-Canadian fur trapper
- Julien Pillet (born 1977), French sabre fencer
- Léon Pillet (1803–1868), French journalist, civil servant and director of the Paris Opera from 1840 to 1847
