= Stéphane Lupasco =

Romanian philosopher

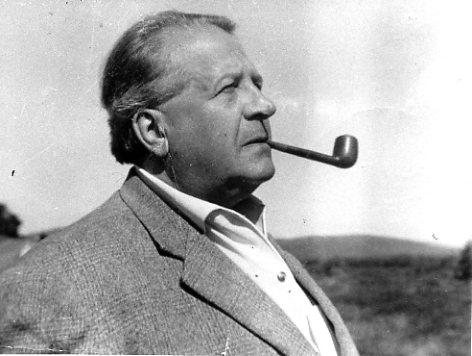
Stéphane Lupasco

Stéphane Lupasco (born Ștefan Lupașcu; 11 August 1900 – 7 October 1988) was a Romanian philosopher who developed non-Aristotelian logic.

== Early years ==
Stéphane Lupasco was born in Bucharest on 11 August 1900. His family belonged to the old Moldavian aristocracy. His father was a lawyer and politician, but it was his mother, a pianist and student of César Franck, who established the family in Paris in 1916. After high school at the Lycée Buffon, he studied philosophy, biology and physics at the Sorbonne and, briefly, law. He participated fully in the artistic and intellectual life of Paris in the 20s and 30s and defended his State Doctoral Thesis in 1935.

== Academic career ==
In 1946, he was named research assistant at the French National Science Research Centre, a post he was obliged to leave ten years later because of the inability of the Centre to decide in which Scientific Section his work belonged! The next ten or fifteen years were those of greatest acceptance of his work by the public and other thinkers, but unfortunately not by mainstream logicians and philosophers. His Trois Matières, published in 1960 was a bestseller, and people began calling Lupasco the Descartes, the Leibniz, the Hegel of the 20th Century, a new Claude Bernard, a new Bergson, etc. He continued to publish books in the 70s and 80s, the last being L’Homme et ses Trois Éthiques in 1986, two years before his death on October 7, 1988 in Paris. An Award of the American Academy of Arts and Sciences in 1984 was among the few honors that came to Lupasco during his lifetime. Lupasco was one of the founding members of the International Center for Transdisciplinary Research (Centre International de Recherches et Etudes Transdisciplinaires (CIRET)), founded in Paris in 1987 by Basarab Nicolescu, Edgar Morin, René Berger, Michel Random and other key figures of the French intelligentsia. As Nicolescu has recalled, Lupasco was deeply affected by the stubborn resistance of the academic community to honest debate and discussion of his new principles and postulates, and it is with an understandable bitterness that Lupasco saw in this resistance another example of the operation of his principles.

== Summary of work ==
Lupasco’s style as an author is not an easy one, and requires the uninterrupted attention of the reader. It is not infrequent to find sentences of almost a page in length, containing multiple nested clauses. His writing is extremely dense in terms of the ideas and meaning of each successive phrase, with only occasional illustrative examples. Lupasco makes many references to his prior publications, unfortunately, often without adequate indexation. As Nicolescu has remarked, Lupasco’s exclusion from French academic life had both advantages and disadvantages: Lupasco was freed from the constraints of teaching and publication of research papers in a rigid format, and he obviously did not find it necessary to apply the discipline of providing references to his sources. In the Psychic Universe, published when Lupasco was seventy-nine, one sees nothing about current work in psychiatry. (Lupasco unfortunately did not read English well, and hence no references to the “anti”-psychiatry of R. D. Laing and Gregory Bateson, close in spirit to his work, are to be found.) A recent study by Brenner (2008) up-dates Lupasco’s work and shows its relevance to current issues in science and philosophy, as well as logic.

== Influence ==
Lupasco was not well served by the (few) exegetes that had looked closely at his work. Only one book, by the sociologist Marc Beigbeder, presents both a substantial description of Lupasco’s theory and development of it as a “logic of society”. A brief monograph by the philosopher Benjamin Fondane, dating from 1944 (just prior to his deportation and death) and published in 1998, discusses the limitations of Lupasco’s view of affectivity and ontology. A book by an obscure English artist, George Melhuish, uses Lupasco’s ideas to develop his own concept of the structure of the universe, a sympathetic but not very rigorous reading of his work. Aside from Nicolescu's personal library it has been claimed that access to these and several other texts are otherwise unavailable. A complete understanding of, for example, Lupasco’s analysis of those precursors that André Glucksmann has called “Les Maîtres Penseurs” – Kant, Hegel, Schopenhauer and Marx – must be sought in several different books. The attention of the reader is rewarded, however, by Lupasco’s regular restatements of his basic theses, often in a way that is more economic, meaningful and coherent.

In his introduction to Lupasco’s The Principle of Antagonism and the Logic of Energy, Nicolescu points out that once the reader gets beyond the (relatively few) mathematical formulas in this book, Lupasco’s language is perfectly accessible. “It exemplifies, in a self-referential manner, the ternary aspects of actualization, potentialization and included middle which give it the charm and the privilege of incantations that are at the same time scientific, philosophical and poetic.”

Summarizing briefly, stimulated by Albert Einstein's works and quantum theory, Lupasco founded a new logic, questioning the tertium non datur principle of classical logic. He introduced a third state, going beyond the duality principle, the T-state. The T-state is neither 'actual', nor 'potential' (categories replacing in Lupasco's system the 'true' or 'false' values of standard bivalent logic), but a resolution of the two contradictory elements at a higher level of reality or complexity. Lupasco generalised his logic to physics and epistemology and above all to a new theory of consciousness.

== Recent studies ==
A key reference in French is the compendium of 1999, "Stéphane Lupasco -The Man and the Work" by H. Badescu and B. Nicolescu. The first comprehensive update and comparison of Lupasco's thought in English is the 2008 book by J. E. Brenner, "Logic in Reality". Other useful new references are the combined papers of a Symposium on Lupasco in 2009 "At the Confluence of Two Cultures: Lupasco Today," in French and a biographical paper by Brenner, "The Philosophical Logic of Stéphane Lupasco (1900 - 1988)" in English.

== Works ==
1. Logique et contradiction, P. U. F., Paris, 1947.
2. Le principe d'antagonisme et la logique de l'énergie. Prolégomènes à une science de la contradiction, Hermann & Co., Paris, 1951.
3. Du devenir logique et de l’affectivité; Vol. 1 : Le dualisme antagoniste; Vol. 2 : Essai d’une nouvelle théorie de la connaissance. Paris : Vrin, 1935; 2nd edition 1973.
4. Les trois matières. Paris : Julliard, 1960 (LTM)
5. Qu’est-ce qu’une structure? Paris: Christian Bourgois, 1967
6. La tragédie de l'énergie. Paris: Casterman, 1970
7. L’univers psychique. Paris: Editions Denoël/Gonthier, 1979.
8. L’énergie et la matière vivante. Monaco: Éditions du Rocher. (Originally published in Paris: Julliard, 1962.), 1986
9. La topologie énergétique. In Pensées hors du Rond, La Liberté de l’esprit. 12: 13-30. Paris: Hachette, 1986
10. L’Homme et ses trois éthiques. Paris: Editions du Rocher, 1986
11. L’énergie et la matière psychique. Monaco: Éditions du Rocher. (Originally published in Paris: Julliard, 1974.), 1987.

== See also ==
Many-valued logic

Non-Aristotelian logic
