= Ionel Teodoreanu =

Romanian novelist and lawyer (1897 – 1954)

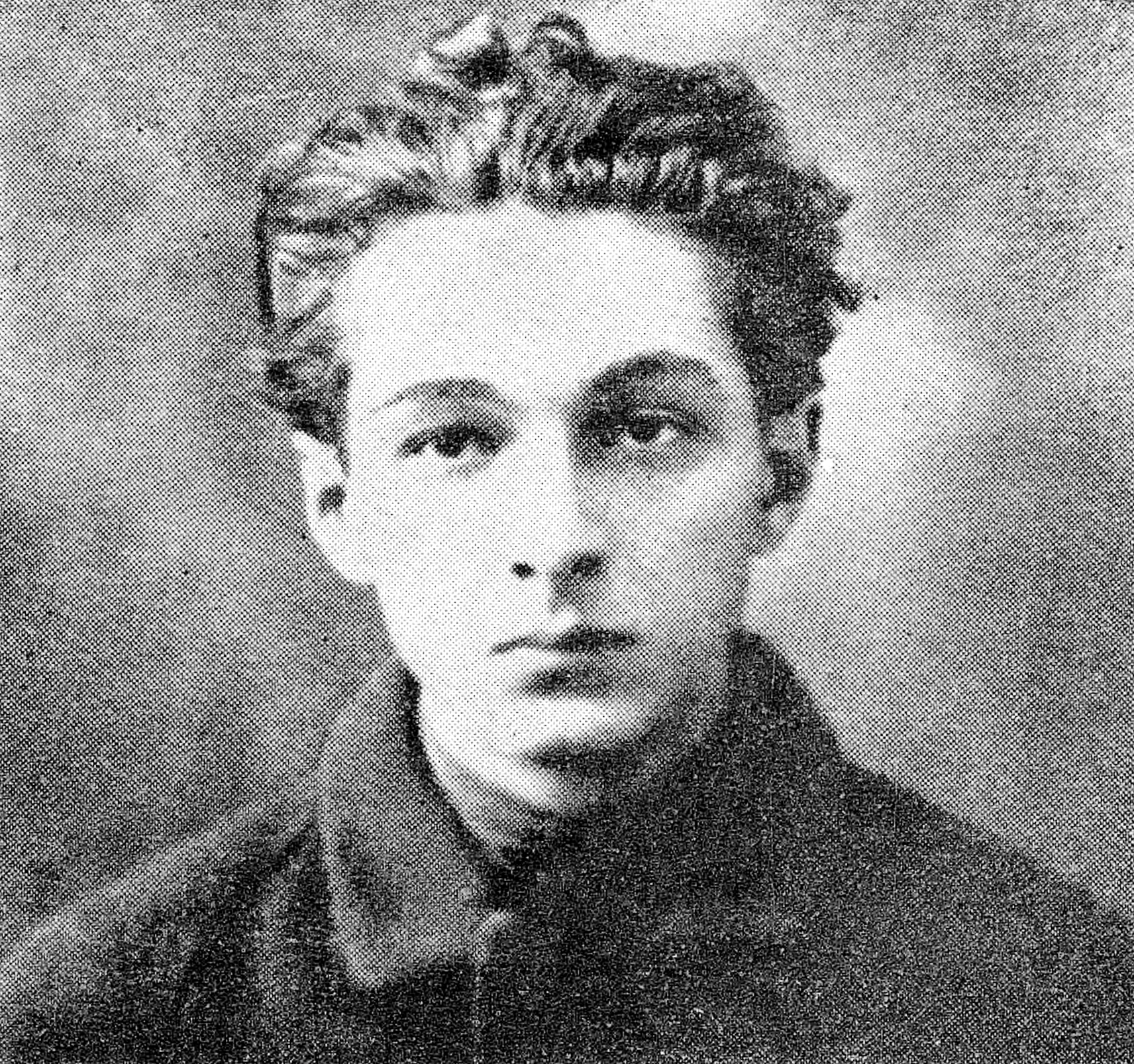
- Ionel Teodoreanu in 1919
- Born: Ioan Hipolit Teodoreanu; January 6, 1897; Iași, Kingdom of Romania
- Died: February 3, 1954 (aged 57); Bucharest, Romanian People's Republic
- Resting place: Bellu Cemetery, Bucharest, Romania
- Education: University of Iași
- Occupations: Novelist, lawyer
- Writing career
- Genre: Novel

Ionel Teodoreanu (Romanian pronunciation: [joˈnel te.odoˈre̯anu], born Ioan Hipolit Teodoreanu; 6 January 1897 – 3 February 1954) was a Romanian novelist and lawyer. He is mostly remembered for his books on the themes of childhood and adolescence.

== Biography ==
Born in January 1897 in Iași into a family of intellectuals, Teodoreanu followed his father Osvald and older brother Păstorel in becoming a lawyer. From 1904 to 1906 he attended the German primary school of Pitar-Moș in Bucharest, until his parents moved back to Iași. Between 1908 and 1912 he attended the Boarding High School in Iași. He later transferred to the National College, which he attended until he graduated in 1916. Teodoreanu obtained his law degree from the University of Iași in 1919, and began to work as a lawyer, although he was more attracted to literature.

In late 1918, Teodoreanu he was introduced to his future wife, Maria Ștefana Lupașcu, by Barbu Ștefănescu Delavrancea's daughters. The two young people became close due to their mutual passion for literature and their disposition towards writing, and they married in 1920. One year later, on 3 February 1921, he became the father of twin boys, Ștefan and Osvald. Ionel Teodoreanu died on 3 February 1954, at age 57, in Bucharest, and was buried in the city's Bellu Cemetery.

== Literary works ==
Teodoreanu made his literary debut in 1919, with the Bunicii ("The Grandparents") sketch, published in the review Însemnări literare (Literary notes). His editorial debut was represented by the short story volume Ulița copilăriei ("Childhood Lane", 1923). Like his brother Păstorel—a renowned epigrammatist—he was linked to the Romanian Life group led by Garabet Ibrăileanu, who considered him to one of the most promising writers of the generation following World War I. In this environment, Teodoreanu published his classic novel trilogy. La Medeleni between 1925 and 1927.

=== La Medeleni ===
Teodoreanu wrote around twenty books, but his greatest success, especially with children and young people, was La Medeleni. The trilogy includes several autobiographical episodes, and, on a universal level, constitute a subtle analysis of the human soul. The trilogy is not without its critics; George Călinescu argued that Teodoreanu's style was too laden with metaphors and rather baroque.

The universe of La Medeleni reflects the upper middle class environment in Romania during the early decades of the 20th century. It depicts the innocence of childhood which the ravages of the World War and its aftermath would soon shatter. Although Teodoreanu did not write it as an autobiography, his experience of having grown up in such a family in Moldavia during this time was influential.

=== Lorelei ===
Teodoreanu abandoned the childhood theme in most of his later literary works and never again reached the same level of success, but his books are still loved.

In Lorelei, the main character is Luli, an eighteen-year-old student who falls in love with her teacher, Catul Bogdan, becoming engaged to him just three days after their first meeting. Bogdan is a workaholic writer, and soon Luli starts to feel abandoned and unloved. With the help of her friend, Gabriela, Luli sets to play a game with her husband. She writes some poems, and makes her friend Gabriela write them down, signing them with the pseudonym "Lorelei" and then mail them to her husband. Catul is amazed by the quality of the poems and slowly falls in love with the woman who wrote them. After a while, when Gabriela visits them, he sees a piece of paper with her writing and believes she is the mysterious "Lorelei". Luli realizes what is going on, but before this situation could be defused, dies due to an acute appendicitis. Catul later marries Gabriela, but their relationship is marred by the character faults of Gabriela. He starts having nightmares and loses his ability to write. Finally, he realizes that Gabriela is only after his money, learns the true identity of "Lorelei", and commits suicide.

== Bibliography ==
=== Selected published novels ===
- La Medeleni ("At the Medeleni")
- Bal mascat ("Masquerade Ball")
- Fata din Zlataust ("The Girl of Zlataust")
- Lorelei
- Golia
- Turnul Milenei ("Milena's Tower")
- Iarbă ("Grass")

=== Autobiographies ===
- În casa bunicilor ("My Grandparents' House")
- Masa umbrelor ("Table of Shadows")

== Sources ==
- Kurt W. Treptow. Introduction to One Moldavian Summer by Ionel Teodoreanu
