= Șerban Cioculescu =

Romanian literary critic, literary historian and columnist

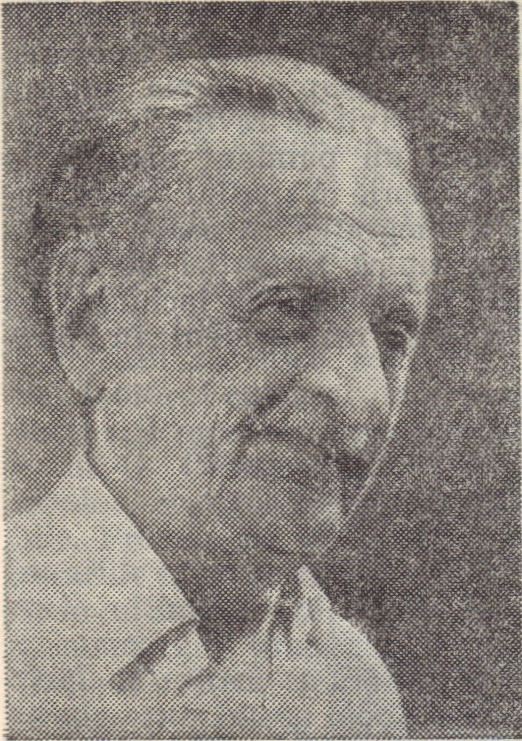
Șerban Cioculescu

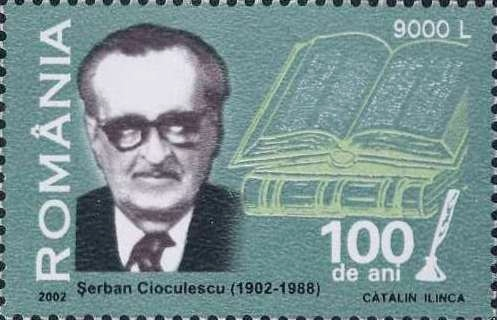
Cioculescu on a 2002 Romanian stamp

Șerban Cioculescu (Romanian pronunciation: [ʃerˈban tʃjokuˈlesku]; 7 September 1902 – 25 June 1988) was a Romanian literary critic, literary historian and columnist who was born in Drobeta-Turnu Severin and died in Bucharest. He held teaching positions in Romanian literature at the University of Iași and the University of Bucharest, as well as membership of the Romanian Academy and chairmanship of its Library. Often described as one of the most representative Romanian critics of the interwar period, he took part in the cultural debates of the age, and, as a left-wing sympathizer who supported secularism, was involved in extended polemics with the traditionalist, far right and nationalist press venues. From early on in his career, Cioculescu was also noted for his selective approach to literary modernism and the avant-garde, preferring to place his cultural references with Neoclassicism.

Acclaimed for his research into the work and biographies of writers Ion Luca Caragiale and Tudor Arghezi, and considered one of the leading experts on these subjects, he was primarily a literary columnist. Throughout his lifetime, Cioculescu worked with prominent Romanian press venues, among them Adevărul, Curentul, Dreptatea, Gazeta Literară and România Literară. Marginalized by fascist governments during World War II and persecuted by the communist regime up to the 1960s, Cioculescu later developed an ambiguous relationship with the national communist authorities, returning to the cultural mainstream and regaining his influence over the literary scene. It was during the latter interval that Cioculescu provoked several controversies, primarily by speaking out against the rebellious Onirist writers and the innovative poetry of Nichita Stănescu.

Cioculescu had a complex relationship with the critics of his generation, between a lifelong friendship with Vladimir Streinu and a fluctuating rivalry with George Călinescu. He was brother to essayist, critic and victim of the communist regime Radu Cioculescu, and father to writer Barbu Cioculescu.

== Biography ==
=== Early years ===
As he was to recall later in life, Șerban Cioculescu was a sickly and inhibited child, who enjoyed spending his time in the family garden. Born in Bucharest, he was the second son of engineer N. Cioculescu, and the younger brother (by one year) of Radu, who later made himself known for both his original literary works and his translations from Marcel Proust. Both parents died when the brothers were still young children: their father in 1912, their mother in 1914. They were assigned to the care of his grandparents, who reputedly favored a severe approach to education. According to Cioculescu, although objectionable, his grandmother's stern nature ultimately contributed to fortifying his internal self, given that "happiness has no educational virtues."

Cioculescu's primary education was completed at the Schewitz-Thierrin boarding school, which left him with other similarly unpleasant memories. He later graduated from the Traian High School in Turnu Severin, a Danube port in western Romania. He subsequently attended Bucharest University's Faculty of Letters and Philosophy, where he specialized in the study of the French language. Cioculescu had among his professors critics Mihail Dragomirescu and Ovid Densusianu, comparatist Charles Drouhet, as well as historians Nicolae Iorga and Vasile Pârvan. He made himself known early on by speaking out his mind during Dragomirescu's lectures, and taking distance from his teacher's opinions. It was during one of Dragomirescu's classes that Cioculescu first met Vladimir Streinu, who became his best friend. He was also acquainted to and fell in love with his female colleague Maria (Mioara) Iovițoiu, whom he soon after married.

Cioculescu made his press debut in 1923, when he began publishing reviews in the literary supplement of Facla, the magazine created and led by socialist writer N. D. Cocea. As he later recalled, Cocea encouraged him to pursue this activity further, telling him: "I believe you have the fabric of a critic." Over the following years, he had numerous articles and regular columns published in several venues, including the left-wing daily Adevărul and Camil Petrescu's weekly Săptămâna Muncii Intelectuale și Artistice. He was also a frequenter of Sburătorul circle, established by his older colleague, literary theorist Eugen Lovinescu.

He underwent further training in France (1926–1928), studying at the University of Paris' École Pratique des Hautes Etudes and the Collège de France. Planning to write his Ph.D. on the life and work of French man of letters Ferdinand Brunetière, he had initially applied for a state scholarship, but lost it when the state police, Siguranța Statului, having caught rumor that he held suspicious left-wing ideas, opened a file on him. Instead, he relied on money inherited from his maternal family, the Millotens, to finance both his trip and studies and provide for his pregnant wife. Their son, Barbu Cioculescu, was born before the end of their sojourn, an event which increased the family's expenses. During the same period, Cioculescu frequented other Romanian students in Paris—sociologist Mircea Vulcănescu and linguist Alexandru Graur.

=== Debut ===
Shortly after his return from Paris, Cioculescu established himself as a presence on the literary scene, and began frequenting the informal and bohemian literary club formed around Casa Capșa restaurant. One of his earliest polemics was carried with his colleague Perpessicius by means of Adevărul journal: Cioculescu found his adversary's aesthetic relativism and rejection of "sectarianism" to be incompatible with the mission of critic. Between 1928 and 1929, Cioculescu and Streinu were on the staff of Kalende, a literary magazine published in Pitești, Argeș County. After a short interval during which he worked as a schoolteacher in Găești town (where he was notably a contributor to the short-lived modernist review Cristalul), Cioculescu entered the civil service, becoming an inspector of Romanian schools. This was the alleged start of a documented lifelong rivalry between Cioculescu and literary historian George Călinescu: the inspector reportedly chose to intervene during an Italian-language class Călinescu was giving to high school students, and managed instead to infuriate him.

Between 1928 and 1937, when the newspaper was banned, Cioculescu was, with Felix Aderca and Lovinescu, one of the main literary columnists of Adevărul, writing studies on novels by Camil Petrescu, Liviu Rebreanu and Mihail Sadoveanu. His contributions also included polemical pieces on generically cultural subjects, such as a 1929 essay on the Romanians, their process of ethnogenesis and the links with the Roman Empire (titled Latinitatea noastră, "Our Latinness"). In 1934, another one of his essays was published by the state-sponsored literary review Revista Fundațiilor Regale. It was an overview of diverse novels and novelists to have made themselves remarked during the previous year: Mircea Eliade, Gib Mihăescu, Cezar Petrescu, Gala Galaction, Constantin Stere, Ionel Teodoreanu, Tudor Teodorescu-Braniște, Damian Stănoiu and George Mihail Zamfirescu, alongside Dragomirescu, Lovinescu, Camil Petrescu, Rebreanu and Sadoveanu.

His earliest contribution to publishing was a 1935 volume covering the final part of Ion Luca Caragiale's life, as reflected by the correspondence between the writer and literary critic Paul Zarifopol. His interest in the 19th-century author also covered the unpublished notes of his recently deceased son, novelist Mateiu Caragiale. He studied and partly transcribed Mateiu's notes, some of which reportedly made hostile claims about his father—both the notes and a large portion of his rendition (borrowed by Cioculescu himself to Mateiu's half-sister Ecaterina) mysteriously disappeared over the following decade.

=== Cioculescu and the "new generation" controversies ===
At the time, he also made the acquaintance of Mircea Eliade, a rebellious essayist and modernist novelist who exercised his influence over a large part of Romanian public opinion, and who called for a spiritual revolution. Literary historians Z. Ornea and Nicolae Manolescu both note that, although Cioculescu and his group were very close to Eliade in terms of chronology, the difference in attitude made them seem and be referred to as the "old generation". Cioculescu reviewed Eliade's Itinerariu spiritual ("Spiritual Itinerary") collection for Viața Literară magazine. According to Eliade himself, this was done "critically but with great sympathy", while Italian researcher Emanuela Costantini defined the entire debate as having been carried out in "rather tame tones". This opinion is partly shared by Manolescu, who views Cioculescu's original reaction as "somewhat benevolent", while the subsequent articles on the subject featured a more polemical nature. Cioculescu acknowledged Eliade's "impressive erudition" and status as "column leader" of a generation concerned with Romanian Orthodox spirituality and mysticism, but contended that Eliade's manner was "occasionally plethoric, poetically inebriating itself through abuse".

While the two figures continued to criticize each other in writing over theoretical aspects, Cioculescu admired Eliade the novelist. In 1932, the former was among the jury members granting the Editura Cultura Națională annual prize for literature, and was instrumental in assigning the distinction to Eliade's Bengal Nights novel. In late autumn, he attended a session of Eliade's group Criterion, which was at the time a platform organizing public debates around intellectuals of various hues, and was admitting speakers from the far left, the far right, and various moderate fields in between. The conference, which discussed the attitudes of French novelist and Marxist essayist André Gide, was interrupted by members of the fascist and antisemitic National-Christian Defense League, who heckled the speakers and threatened them with violence. The incident was reported by the League's newspaper Asaltul, which praised the affiliates for standing up against Gide's communism and homosexuality, and accused Cioculescu, Vulcănescu and sociologist Mihai Ralea of representing both pro-Soviet sentiment and pacifism. Cioculescu also offered a good review to Eliade's novel Întoarcerea din rai ("Return from Paradise"), first published in 1934.

Also in 1934, Cioculescu was scandalized by the Nu ("No"), a radically voiced manifesto by Eugène Ionesco (later known as a dramatist), and, with fellow critic Tudor Vianu, voted against granting him the Editura Fundațiilor Regale prize (they were the only ones to do so). Reputedly, Nu had especially scandalized Cioculescu for denying the merit of Tudor Arghezi's poetry, and for defining Arghezi himself as a "mechanical poet". Nu also featured provocative remarks and allegations about critics in general and Cioculescu in particular: "A critic is a stupid animal. [...] The stupid man is the man to whom realities are opaque. The literary critic has to be stupid. In fortunate cases, the critic is stupid by obligation, because of professional habit, and some other times the critic is stupid by vocation. A professional with a vocation is somebody who cannot have any other profession except the one he has and who, if that profession does not exist, invents it. [Example of a] critic by professional habit: Mr. Șerban Cioculescu."

=== Other debates of the 1930s ===
In parallel, Cioculescu was making himself known for his resistance to the traditionalist and far right calls for state-imposed censorship, based on allegations that modernism was equatable to pornography. His defense of Arghezi's poetry and its daring themes in front of traditionalists also made him an adversary of his former teacher Iorga. In reaction, Cioculescu joined fellow literary columnists Perpessicius, Streinu and Pompiliu Constantinescu on Gruparea Criticilor Literari Români (GCLR, the Group of Romanian Literary Critics), a professional association which aimed to protect its members' reputation. The society, which also included Mihail Sebastian, Ion Biberi and Octav Șuluțiu, entered a polemic with Iorga's Cuget Clar magazine, defending Arghezi against accusations of obscenity repeatedly launched by Iorga and his journalist colleague N. Georgescu-Cocoș.

However, Cioculescu himself associated modernism with pornography, and expressed his distaste for erotic literature in general. In a 1934 article, he claimed that Lady Chatterley's Lover, the controversial novel of English author D. H. Lawrence, like various works of pulp fiction translated from English, served to titillate "the impubescent and the perverted". He urged Romanian publishers to review their criteria by opting for aesthetic value in favor of commercial success. Writing for Adevărul journal in late 1936, Cioculescu reprimanded Eliade for what he perceived as inconsistency: himself repeatedly accused of being a pornographer by sections of the far right, the novelist had reacted against "opportunistic" colleagues who published erotic texts in order to commercially exploit the controversy. Contrasting his works with theirs, Eliade claimed that he had introduced "aggressive and savage" erotic scenes to his novels so as to provide "a vital dimension" to his characters. Recalling the critic's reaction to this perspective, he assessed: "[Cioculescu was] showing through my own example that the distinction I wanted to make between 'writers' and 'opportunists' was an impractical one. The article did not convince me."

By the mid-1930s, Cioculescu rallied with several initiatives associated with left politics and the cause of anti-fascism. In 1934, he declared himself favorable to the deescalation of tensions between the Soviet state and Romania (strained by the issue of Bessarabia), and signed his name to a leftist manifesto which created the Amicii URSS society (outlawed later that year by Premier Gheorghe Tătărescu). During 1937, questioned by Azi newspaper on the issue of political censorship he stated that his beliefs were both anti-fascist and anti-communist, arguing that such phenomena could only be permitted "in the totalitarian state, fascist as well as communist".

=== World War II ===
Cioculescu's stances resulted in his marginalization early during World War II, when, after the fall of King Carol II's National Renaissance Front, the fascist and antisemitic Iron Guard took over (see Romania during World War II). Dumitru Caracostea, appointed by the National Legionary government as head of Revista Fundațiilor Regale suspended the contributions of critics whom he considered supporters of Jewish literature: Perpessicius, Cioculescu and Streinu. The measure raised angry comments from the anti-fascist Lovinescu, who deemed it "idiotic".

Instead, Cioculescu made his living teaching French language at Bucharest's Saint Sava National College. He had among his students G. Brătescu, the future physician and medical historian, also known as a Communist Party militant after the war (before being marginalized and excluded by the group in the late 1950s). In his 2003 autobiography, Brătescu recalled that Cioculescu's method went beyond the Romanian curriculum and parallel to the National Legionary requirements, introducing his students to innovative French 19th- and 20th-century authors, from Arthur Rimbaud to Marcel Proust. Also according to Brătescu, Cioculescu introduced his students to the banned or unpublished works of Arghezi, and openly praised the poet's political stance. In late 1940, Cioculescu also reacted to the Iron Guard's mass murders of politicians affiliated with previous regimes—the Jilava Massacre and the killings of Iorga and economist Virgil Madgearu. His Saint Sava student Brătescu, who frequented Iorga's circles in Vălenii de Munte, presented him with some of Iorga's final texts for Cuget Clar.

These incidents came shortly before the Iron Guard's own ouster from power (the Legionary Rebellion). Cioculescu maintained a low profile during the following period, when the country was placed under an authoritarian regime presided upon by the Guard's former ally, Conducător Ion Antonescu. The period saw Cioculescu focusing on his activities as a literary historian, publisher and editor. In 1940, he published his synthesis Viața lui I. L. Caragiale ("The Life of I. L. Caragiale"). For a while, he accepted the offer made by official journalist Pamfil Șeicaru to manage the literary supplement of his Curentul newspaper. The journal also published the fragments from Iorga's works in his possession. The following year, he was, with Perpessicius, Vianu and Streinu, co-author of Editura Vremea's special volume of praise for Lovinescu, who was at the time marginalized by the Antonescu regime. In 1942, Cioculescu oversaw the revised edition of Peregrinulu transelvanu ("The Transylvanian Pilgrim"), a travel account by the 19th century author and activist Ion Codru-Drăgușanu, detailing the author's impressions of England and France.

By 1944, he was reintegrated into the corps of school inspectors by the Antonescu cabinet's Education Minister Ion Petrovici (who had also employed Streinu as his adviser). According to a rumor spread by Jewish Romanian author Sergiu Dan (and passed on by diarist Emil Dorian), the antisemitic Petrovici intended to task Cioculescu and Streinu with compiling an official history of Romanian literature to compete with George Călinescu's liberal version (the 1941 Istoria literaturii române); reportedly, the goal was to eliminate all Jewish contributions to local letters, about which Călinescu had spoken in detail. The Cioculescu family's condemnation of official antisemitic policies and the Holocaust in Romania was however stated by Radu Cioculescu, who had witnessed and exposed murders committed by the Romanian Army on the Eastern Front.

In early 1944, when, as a result of Antonescu's Axis commitment, Bucharest was subject to a massive air bombardment, the Cioculescus took refuge to the southwestern periphery of Bucharest, moving into a small house in Ciorogârla. They subsequently moved into a villa owned by Șeicaru, where, as the Red Army troops entered Romanian territory; according to Barbu Cioculescu, the host and guest would debate the future of Romania in the post-fascist era—with Șeicaru expressing his hope in the Western Allies' anti-communism, and Cioculescu believing in a restoration of democracy with Soviet consent. According to the same author, Cioculescu-father was thrilled by the fall of Vichy France and ridiculed French Nazi collaborators who had escaped to Bucharest. Șeicaru left the country soon before the Royal Coup of August 1944, which aligned Romania with the Allied Powers, and the house was soon after occupied by Romanian soldiers of the Soviet-commanded Tudor Vladimirescu Division, leaving the family to move back into central Bucharest.

=== Late 1940s and communist persecution ===
Between 1944 and 1947, Cioculescu held a column in Dreptatea, the main press organ of the National Peasants' Party—a main representative of the opposition to the increasingly powerful Romanian Communist Party. Also in 1944, he joined Vianu and Streinu in authoring Istoria literaturii române moderne ("The History of Modern Romanian Literature"). The following year, he made his debut as a theater critic and chronicler, after accepting to collaborate with the short-lived newspaper Semnalul (published by lawyer Sebastian Șerbescu). Shortly after Lovinescu's death, Cioculescu was also one of the literary professionals on the commission granting the newly established Lovinescu memorial award, presented to aspiring authors such as Ștefan Augustin Doinaș. His next book, Introducere în opera lui Tudor Arghezi ("An Introduction to the Work of Tudor Arghezi"), was printed in 1946.

Cioculescu eventually took his Ph.D. in 1945, with a monograph on Dimitrie Anghel, the early-20th-century poet and representative of Romania's Symbolist school. As he himself recalled, this decision came after Dean Constantin Balmuș promised him a teaching position at the University of Iași Faculty of Letters, if he agreed to obtain the necessary qualifications within a short interval. His dissertation reviewer was Tudor Vianu, and the commission evaluating his candidature for the teaching post comprised George Călinescu, who assured him of being "my candidate". In July 1946, after earning approval from the commission, Cioculescu took over his new assignment, sharing the chair with Călinescu.

The critic again found himself marginalized with the 1947–1948 establishment of the Romanian communist regime. As early as October 1947, he was stripped of his University of Iași position through an ex post facto decision adopted by Education Minister Ștefan Voitec (and which reputedly contradicted Romanian law). Cioculescu braved political persecution and communization, attending, with Strainu, the clandestine literary meetings organized by his fellow critic Pavel Chihaia.

During the state-endorsed supremacy of the Socialist Realist establishment, Cioculescu was targeted by communist censorship, being closely scrutinized and having his publishing privileges reduced to a minimum. In a 1949 piece, communist ideologue Leonte Răutu singled out Cioculescu for his conclusion on 19th century Romanian author Mihai Eminescu, widely seen as Romania's national poet. Răutu's article, a negative review of "cosmopolitan" tendencies in local literature, reacted against Cioculescu's interpretation of Eminescu's work as a late consequence of German Romanticism. After 1954, however, Cioculescu was allowed to contribute articles for Gazeta Literară, a new magazine headed by communist figure Paul Georgescu.

By 1950, Cioculescu and Streinu were attending the clandestine cultural circle formed around Barbu Slătineanu, an art historian and aristocrat. According to Mircea Eliade, who was living in self-exile to Western Europe and later the United States, Cioculescu was implicated in the 1955–1956 affair that led to the communist prosecution of tens of intellectuals, among them philosopher Constantin Noica and critic Dinu Pillat. The main pieces of evidence in this case were samizdat translations of texts by Romanian diaspora authors, primarily Emil Cioran, which were circulated in the anti-communist milieus. Another incriminating evidence used by the communist authorities was a clandestine translation of Eliade's own Noaptea de Sânziene novel, transported into Romania and made accessible to Cioculescu. According to Eliade, although Cioculescu "didn't have to suffer the consequences", it was he who lent a copy to Pillat, Streinu and writer Nicolae Steinhardt, all of whom were arrested and sentenced to long prison terms. Slătineanu was also among those arrested, and died a mysterious death while being investigated. When confronted with news of his friend's death, Cioculescu wrote: "a world is gone".

Writer Ștefan Agopian, who met Cioculescu during the 1980s, recalled that the literary community was puzzled as to why Cioculescu himself was not arrested, and claims that his rescue was largely owed to Paul Georgescu, who secretly harbored anti-Stalinist convictions of his own. Agopian cites Georgescu saying: "He had done nothing wrong, so he was still usable, we could not afford to lose a guy like Cioculescu just so we could have our prisons filled. Cioculescu's luck was that the idiots upstairs listened to me." However, according to the account of comparatist Matei Călinescu, who was then working for Gazeta Literară, Georgescu took personal part in censoring Cioculescu's work: in one such case, Cioculescu had written a political text on the occasion of May Day, believing that the Party was requesting a sign of loyalty from him, but unaware that authors with few political credentials were in fact barred from publishing around national holidays. According to this account, Georgescu was infuriated by his subordinate's action, and made a point of disavowing it publicly—an attitude linked by him with Georgescu's dogmatism. According to Agopian, this was nevertheless a subtle attempt to prevent Cioculescu from discrediting his name by associating it with communist messages.

=== 1960s recuperation and later life ===
Cioculescu's attitude and status changed radically in the 1960s. At the time, as Gazeta Literară was taken out of circulation, Cioculescu became editor in chief of Viața Românească, one of the country's oldest literary reviews. Writing in 2001, critic Iulian Băicuș described the writer as a "convert on the Road to Damascus, which back then was passing through Moscow". According to historian Vladimir Tismăneanu, Cioculescu, like George Călinescu and Vladimir Streinu, was persuaded by the national communist discourse adopted by previously Stalinist leader Gheorghe Gheorghiu-Dej, which implied a rapprochement between the regime and the intellectuals. In 1961, his brother, Radu Cioculescu, was a victim of communist repression, dying as a political prisoner in Dej penitentiary. According to a testimony by fellow inmate Ion Ioanid, the last months of Radu Cioculescu's life were marked by a fall-out with his brother, probably caused by their ideological rift: he was returning packages sent by Șerban and repeatedly denying him visits.

Cioculescu's prestige continued to increase during the spell of liberalization corresponding to the early rule of Gheorghiu-Dej's successor Nicolae Ceaușescu. He was granted chairmanship of the Bucharest Faculty of Letters in 1965, holding it for ten years. During the same interval, he was also assigned chairmanship of the Romanian Academy Library, overseeing some of Romania's largest collections of books. According to his student, literary historian Alex. Ștefănescu, Cioculescu established his reputation as "an old fashion erudite" among those who attended university during the late 1960s and early 1970s, and was the hero of several anecdotes popular with students. Ștefănescu argues that this was part of a larger phenomenon, which implied the recovery of interwar culture by young intellectuals: "For the world of communism, he miraculously personified the intellectual climate of the pre-war period. Not by accident, almost all the interviews he gave would obsessively return to questions about his advanced age, to the spiritual testament he dedicated to his followers and so on. This almost indecent inquisitiveness was explained not by the age as such, but by the feeling that the literary historian and critic belonged to another epoch."

Around 1967, the Ceaușescu regime convinced both Cioculescu and Streinu to travel abroad and initiate contacts with Eugène Ionesco, whom it wished to co-opt as an external backer. However, upon meeting, all three men decided to discuss purely literary matters. After a twenty-year hiatus, Cioculescu returned with a volume of essays, Varietăți critice ("Critical Variations", Editura pentru literatură, 1966) and a monograph on Caragiale (I. L. Caragiale, Editura Tineretului, 1967). They were followed by a second revised edition of Viața lui I. L. Caragiale (Editura pentru literatură, 1969). Also in 1969, Cioculescu provoked controversy by participating in the renewed condemnation of the Onirists, a faction of modernist writers who had already been persecuted for rejecting the politicization of literature and for discussing communism as an anguishing, Kafkaesque reality. According to Matei Călinescu, Cioculescu had enjoyed the earliest poetry samples of Onirist co-founder Leonid Dimov, and had intended to have them published in Viața Românească. His later anti-Onirist polemical pieces, published by the Contemporanul review and the Communist Party's official organ Scînteia, condemned the group for escapism, as well as for ignoring the "Marxist-Leninist view of existence" and "the natural order of things" by depicting psychological phenomena which, he claimed, only occurred on "other meridians" (that is, in capitalist countries). At around the same time, Cioculescu also caused a stir by rejecting the entire work of debuting poet Nichita Stănescu, whose experimental pieces had nevertheless earned endorsement at all other levels. In 1970, the critic also contributed a piece on the relationship between communist thinker Vladimir Lenin and literature, published in an anthology edited by the official figure Mihai Novicov.

Several new volumes of Cioculescu's essays were published during the early 1970s. They included a 1971 book documenting his interest in French culture (Medalioane franceze, "French Medallions", Editura Univers), the 1972 Aspecte literare contemporane, 1932–1947 ("Contemporary Literary Aspects, 1932–1947", Editura Minerva). In collaboration with Editura Eminescu, he followed up with the collections Itinerar critic ("Critical Itinerary"), published by Editura Eminescu as five volumes (printed between 1973 and 1989) and a 1974 corpus of his lifelong studies on Caragiale (Caragialiana). He was made a full member of the academy in 1974. His reception speech, a study on the life and work of Bessarabian author Teodor Vârnav, was issued as a separate volume (published by Editura Academiei) in 1975. Also in 1975, Editura Eminescu published his memoirs, Amintiri ("Recollections"), followed in 1976 by the Museum of Romanian Literature's book of interviews 13 rotonde prezidate de Șerban Cioculescu ("13 Round Tables Hosted by Șerban Cioculescu").

=== Retirement and final years ===
Cioculescu retired from academia the same year, but was still a regular visitor of the Academy Library, spending much of his time in the Manuscript Section, where he verified primary sources on Romanian literature. According to Ștefănescu, he used the site as his place of meeting with envoys from various magazines, to whom he submitted his articles and reviews. It was during the 1970s that his son, by then a known literary critic and journalist, married Simona Cioculescu, a specialist in Czech literature, and, in this extended form, the family often left Bucharest and traveled into the countryside areas of Mogoșoaia or Cumpătu, where villas had been set aside by the state for the benefit of writers. In his eighties, Cioculescu withdrew to his small villa in Cotroceni neighborhood, while his activity as a cultural journalist centered on a regular column in the Romanian Writers' Union nationally circulated magazine România Literară. In summer 1978, Cioculescu and his wife were in France. It was there that the critic was reunited with his friend and rival Eliade, while negotiating with Éditions Payot the translation rights for two of Eliade's works on the history of religions. The novelist later claimed that the two of them had discussed the unexpected consequences of Bengal Nights: Cioculescu reportedly confessed having met in Romania Maitreyi Devi, the Indian poet who is believed to have inspired the work, and who is alleged to have had a physical affair with young Eliade—rumors she repeatedly denied, most notably in her own Na Hanyate book. According to this account, Maitreyi was asked by the Romanian critics and librarians to approve of a local version for Na Hanyate, but requested an unaffordable sum of American dollars in return.

Cioculescu's published the last of his princeps edition volumes during the 1980s. In addition to Itinerarii critice, these included the 1982 Poeți români ("Romanian Poets", Editura Eminescu), as well as the 1985 collected commentary on Mihai Eminescu (Eminesciana, Editura Minerva) and similar contribution on Arghezi's career (Argheziana, Editura Eminescu). His final volume, a book of interviews, was published in 1987 as Dialoguri literare ("Literary Dialogues").

== Work ==
=== Context and style ===
Cioculescu is often understood as one in a generation of prominent interwar critics who, although diverse in their views, built on the legacy of Junimea, a 19th-century literary society, and on the tenets of its leader, Titu Maiorescu. The definitions of this group vary somewhat, but definitions usually include Cioculescu, Lovinescu, Streinu, Vianu, George Călinescu, Pompiliu Constantinescu and Perpessicius. Cioculescu viewed Maiorescu as a providential figure, who had prevailed over a climate of cultural chaos, but believed his skills as a critic were not outstanding. Z. Ornea believes that Cioculescu and his colleagues nuanced the Junimist conservative outlook and belief in art for art's sake by borrowing from the historicism of its main left-wing adversaries, the Poporanists and socialists grouped around Viața Românească journal. He argued that such a synthesis was foremost illustrated by Cioculescu's affiliation with Adevărul, which maintained close relations with the Viața Românească group.

Also according to Ornea, the post-Junimist group, alongside Mihail Sebastian and Octav Șuluțiu, was also the leading school of interwar critics, without whom "interwar literature would be hard to imagine." Literary historian Sami Damian sees Cioculescu and several of the others among the "eminent" group of authors directly influenced by the older Lovinescu, opting to "apply a program of aesthetic independence". Similarly, critic and historian Mircea Iorgulescu discussed Cioculescu as a member of Lovinescu's "first posterity". Șerban Cioculescu's own literary style was judged by Alex. Ștefănescu to represent a peak of the interwar tradition, and a link with classical mindset, characterized by calm and erudition, as well as by "the [...] individualism of an urban dweller with a sense of humor". He found its "pedantic and digressive style" similar to that of 19th-century writer Alexandru Odobescu, author of the complex essay Pseudo-cynegetikos, but noted that Cioculescu matched Odobescu's "reverie" with "malicious soberness." In a 1989 essay, literary reviewer Ion Simuț spoke about "the ironic style" of articles and studies authored by Cioculescu, as well as by his colleagues Călinescu and Cornel Regman, and identified by him as inspired by the comediography of Ion Luca Caragiale. However, Cioculescu did not relate to criticism as an integral aspect of literature, believing that it lacked a creative dimension, and warned against the danger posed by subjectivity.

Alex. Ștefănescu argued that, largely as a result of this approach and his preoccupations, Cioculescu did not produce "a monumental work", his writings being structured as summaries "on the margin of documents, magazine, books." Citing Cioculescu's own admission that he lacked necessary "grain of insanity", he also noted that such contributions were nonetheless leading in their field of choice. A characteristic trait of Cioculescu's work was viewed by Ștefănescu as his attachment to Neoclassicism, Neoromaticism and Symbolism, with the implicit rejection of newer currents. His writings, the same commentator noted, were tied to cultural references such as Charles Baudelaire, Benedetto Croce, Victor Hugo and Charles Augustin Sainte-Beuve, and viewed the Comte de Lautréamont and Stéphane Mallarmé as factors of innovation. According to Simona Cioculescu, her father-in-law found a kindred spirit in French Renaissance essayist Michel de Montaigne. Ștefănescu believes that he preserved this hierarchy in assessing Romanian literature, by focusing his study on the pre-1900 age, by regarding the interwar as an unrepeatable peak, and by interpreting the avant-garde as a "heresy". In Ștefănescu's definition, this was primarily a matter of "taste", as his pronouncements on the nature of modern poetry, which aimed to defend some interwar modernists against others, were equally applicable to "the poetry of Nichita Stănescu, that is to say the very person whom Șerban Cioculescu considered a distasteful representative of the modernist heresy." When critic Gheorghe Grigurcu argued that the positions adopted by Cioculescu in the 1960s made him a voice of the official communist-generated direction, Ștefănescu claimed the opposite: "There are still many proofs, among them the systematic (and, of course, unjust) rejection of the poetry written by Nichita Stănescu, an almost unanimously accepted poet, that [Cioculescu] carried on reading Romanian literature in solitude until the end of his life, refusing to become a state-appointed critic."

=== Worldview and related polemics ===
Although Cioculescu was a prominent and constant participant in the other cultural debates of his age, he was, according to Ștefănescu, ill-suited for the purpose of representing a side, and, as a natural "spectator", would have little interest in popularizing a collective viewpoint. The same commentator also notes that this tactic was to prove the most efficient, since it replaced the "bull's merciless assault" with a "torero's pirouette". In reviewing the "opposition against unanimity" displayed by Cioculescu, Ștefănescu also argued that it proved a valuable position in itself, even at times when the critic was being proved wrong: "He happened to be wrong, but on principle he was right."

Even though their group was traditionally viewed as a monolith, the members of Cioculescu's generation often aimed their critical remarks at each other. The debate between Călinescu and Cioculescu was therefore echoed in the former's History of Romanian Literature (first edition 1941), which spoke of Cioculescu as "a major personality" with "an enormous capacity for literary pleasure", but reproached his "fear of commitment" and his "slowness" in entering cultural debates, as well as his interest in details. Ștefănescu writes that Cioculescu made a point of downplaying Călinescu's synthesis, "with the manifest intent of finding cracks in the marble monument". Călinescu also viewed his colleague's tastes as problematic, particularly in matters of poetry assessment, and claimed that such pronouncements tended to fluctuate between "the minimum and the maximum." In his view, Cioculescu had failed to adequately understand the narrative power of works by Liviu Rebreanu (Răscoala) and Mihail Sadoveanu, and had preferred to state objections to minor aspects of their work—all while maintaining an exterior politeness which "promises nothing good to the victim." The book also featured references to clashes between Cioculescu and various other critics of the day, noting that the former's tone "is very cold, but the patients are being led to the door with ceremony". Commenting with irony on his entry in the same volume, Cioculescu himself stated, years after his rival's death: "I would be an ingrate not to thank the shadow of G. Călinescu for having publicly spared me, it being more suited to him to have me destroyed 'in confidence'."

While subdued with time, such tension was even passed into Călinescu's evaluation of his colleague's examination for the University of Iași post, as published by Monitorul Oficial: "Mr. Șerban Cioculescu is a good literary historian with a slow and still sound slow course, and a critic without amplitude or major perspectives, but also lacking the extra-literary prejudice that have stained the activity of many others." The verdict amused its recipient, who stated: "With this 'epochal' reference [...], 'warm' but vague to the nth power [...], I was appointed titular professor of modern Romanian literature".

The main targets of Cioculescu's objections were the mysticism, traditionalism and political radicalism embraced by the right-wing or far right intellectuals in reaction to the political and cultural establishment of Greater Romania. His older colleague Lovinescu, who shared his concerns and defended the notion of liberal democracy, recognized in him an unexpectedly efficient ally: "people with more astute critical senses should have organized themselves long ago into a common front against the enemy that stood on the horizon [...]. They nevertheless failed to understand the danger, its concreteness, and only fought casually. More gifted in this area, Șerban Cioculescu has himself been firing a number of rifle shots and hit his target. The scattered articles against mystics and mystagogues are the finest, the only ones to transpose the fight on an ideological ground, to legitimize it." Alex. Ștefănescu deemed his teacher "a convinced rationalist, whom neither moments of collective exultation contaminated nor the perils managed to turn into an anxious being."

As early as his time with Kalende, Cioculescu took the side of secularism in the debate about the specific values of Romanians, the notion of "Romanian spirituality" and the role the Romanian Orthodox Church could claim in defining them. Early on, he stated that a typical national spirituality was a "desideratum", not a historical reality. Ornea included Cioculescu among the secularists providing a convincing reply to the Orthodox group at Gândirea magazine, and notes that, in doing so, the group also expressed support for Westernization. Early in the 1930s, Cioculescu nominated Gândirea, alongside its partners Curentul and Cuvântul, as a partisan of a dogmatic Orthodoxy "plagued by nullification". According to Ornea's assessment, Cioculescu also shared the belief that Orthodoxy could not support national specificity, since it was closely related to the global Eastern Orthodox Church, and not limited geographically to Romanian-inhabited areas.

In this context, Cioculescu's main grievance against Eliade was the latter's rejection of rationalist approaches, as well as Eliade's exclusive focus on the Romanian Orthodox Church as a vehicle of Romanian spirituality. In particular, Cioculescu noted that Eliade's ideas, borrowed from his mentor Nae Ionescu, vainly attempted to transform the local Orthodoxy into a political movement, and did so by imitating the Roman Catholic Church. To this, he argued, were added Eliade's own eclecticism and "mystical spasms", which he believed explained why the thinker had tried to reconcile Orthodoxy with Anthroposophy, Eastern philosophy, Liberal Christianity or Urreligion. In his replies to Cioculescu's articles, Eliade explained that he neither excluded reason nor prioritized Orthodoxy, but that he believed in the importance of intuition and understood the local church as just one of several supports of a spiritual revolution. In tandem, Cioculescu also reacted against his fellow secularist, philosopher Constantin Rădulescu-Motru, who viewed Romanian spirituality as tied not to a religious institution, but to rural traditions and an immutable village—in Cioculescu's view, even this theory was proven false by the "rapid evolutionary process" which had transformed the Romanian peasantry.

Complimenting his colleague's stance, Lovinescu listed their common adversaries as "Orthodoxism" (favoring a theocracy around the Orthodox Church), Trăirism (the existentialist school formed around Nae Ionescu), the radicalized Criterion group, and the currents which, based on theories stated by historian Vasile Pârvan, placed emphasis on the Thracians and Dacians' contribution to Romanian ethnogenesis at the detriment of Romanization. Speaking about the latter trend, Lovinescu underlined that the objective of his opponents was in overshadowing the "Roman background" of Romanian culture (see protochronism). Cioculescu himself is also credited with having referred to such interpretations as tracomanie ("Thracomania"). His role in combating these phenomenons was acknowledged by Eugène Ionesco, who mentioned his former rival among the critics who preserved the "modernist, Westernized, rationalist" line from a traditionalist one which blended echoes from Iorga's Sămănătorul magazine with mystical or anti-Western messages (and whom Ionesco identified with Nae Ionescu, Vasile Pârvan, Lucian Blaga, Emil Cioran and Constantin Noica).

=== Main critical studies ===
The two main subjects of Cioculescu's work were Caragiale and Arghezi, seen by Alex. Ștefănescu as his "elective affinities" (the same critic notes that the 1945 study of Dimitrie Anghel "was not preceded or followed by works on the same subject"). In Caragiale's case, Ștefănescu argued, Cioculescu proved his "admirable philological rigor", but did not produce a unitary interpretation of his subject: "There is not [...] a single Caragiale as seen by Șerban Cioculescu." He added: "The finality of Șerban Cioculescu's enterprise is something other than erecting a temple, and is in effect the preservation of interest for I. L. Caragiale's work." This was explicitly stated by the author, who was quoted by George Călinescu as stating: "[Caragiale] will indisputably find a writer of great talent to enliven his face." According to Călinescu: "[Cioculescu's] contributions on the subject of Caragiale merit a perfect trust. [...] The biographical talent, which he will not attribute to himself, is nonetheless present in Șerban Cioculescu." Noting that the main techniques used by his colleague were "insinuation" and "repetition", Călinescu proposed: "For the reader used to architecture, the effect may prove disappointing, but for the refined, especially one bored with the sublime style, the impression is relevant. All the essential characteristics of Caragiale the man are lightly touched, pinned down with needles, presented for the internal eye to see."

The main focus of Cioculescu's efforts regarded the recovery and publication of documents detailing the least known aspects of Caragiale's biography and literary output, an activity for which he earned the praise of his peers. He notably discussed Caragiale's political convictions, being among the exegetes who agreed that the writer lacked political ambitions, and personally demonstrating that, by the end of his life, Caragiale was disappointed with the National Liberal–Conservative two-party system. In addition to these tasks, Ștefănescu notes, the critic carried out polemics with Caragiale's various detractors, and produced critical commentary on the characteristics of his diverse writings and personality, as well as on those of his two sons Mateiu and Luca. Mateiu Caragiale, who, despite his hectic lifestyle and eccentricity, established himself as a novelist, was viewed with noted severity by Cioculescu—according to Ștefănescu, the researcher's take came as Mateiu was being "pampered by posterity", while reviewer Paul Cernat sees in him "Mateiu's most hostile critic". According to literary historian Eugen Simion, Cioculescu looked favorably on the post-1960 lift of communist censorship over Mateiu's work, but still found Mateiu's texts to be innately inferior to those of his father.

Cioculescu's other main interest, Arghezi's literary contribution, was the subject of many articles and essays. They pursued a lifelong literary conflict with Arghezi's opponents, responding to claims that his poems were often unintelligible, and commented at length on its "diversity" (bridging modernism and traditionalism). In one such instance, Cioculescu dismissed the claim that Arghezi's Inscripție pe un portret ("Inscription on a Portrait") was riddled with obscure meanings, by offering his interpretation and presenting the issue as soliciting one's perspicacity. Ștefănescu, who described Arghezi as "Don Quixote" to Cioculescu's "Sancho Panza", noted that the critical process resulted in the two of them switching roles, and that the critic himself largely invented the arguments against Arghezi to support his own thesis.

Cioculescu's other topical interests illustrated his circumspect approach to modernism. A modernist reviewed in the 1930s by Cioculescu was novelist Camil Petrescu: commenting on Petrescu's work Ultima noapte de dragoste, întâia noapte de război, the critic joined several of his colleagues who believed the text functioned as two independent ones, a psychological novel and a war novel. Cioculescu viewed Petrescu's stylistic innovation as having abolished "the technical duality of the novel: external observation and internal analysis", merging such elements into a "dynamic psychology". During the late stages of communism, when the regime tolerated the recovery of works by Symbolist poet George Bacovia and thus caused a Bacovian fashion among young writers, Cioculescu cautioned the readers not to take their hero's contributions at face value. In agreement with the theories of George Călinescu, he argued that the deep pessimism which had captivated the public was essentially artificial, and, citing the recollections of Bacovia's colleague I. M. Rașcu, noted that the everyday Bacovia was a cheerful and gregarious figure.

=== Memoirs ===
The critic was the author of several works outside his field of expertise and themselves ascribable to literature. In addition to his memoirs and interviews, these include travel accounts detailing his vacations in Western Europe (where he followed in the footsteps of literary greats Guillaume Apollinaire and Stendhal). Amintiri, completed when Cioculescu was aged 73, details a large portion of his early life, in terms that Cioculescu himself wished plain. As in his outlook on criticism, the writer rejected the notion that his was a creative text, and indicated that he did not wish to make himself seem "more interesting than I really am." In one section of his text, the author claimed that lyricism "does not agree with me". Nevertheless, Simona Cioculescu contends, the book was also an aesthetic revelation, which showed her father-in-law was a versed author of prose. In critic Al. Săndulescu's view: "The author willingly ignored his own sensitivity and artistic taste, his humor, punctuated here and there with some malicious remark, and ultimately his verve and his virtues as an expansive talker [...], in reality the virtues of a raconteur, who, contradicting his excessively self-critical opinion, often produces a literary effect." He adds: "The memoirist enjoys and cultivates chitchat, even if he tarnishes it here and there with too many 'philologicals' and an exaggerated bibliographic exactitude."

In addition to his early childhood memories, which, according to Săndulescu, include a "micro-monograph" of Turnu Severin, the text comprises portraits of significant people in his life, and renditions of incidents occurring between him and various literary figures. Cioculescu looks back on his student years, describing Ovid Densusianu as a "short, limping man" who "did not make a great impression on first sight", referring to Charles Drouhet as "the greatest comparatist of his time", and recalling the stir he had caused after questioning Mihail Dragomirescu's dogmatic opinions. In one chapter, Cioculescu recalls having been one of the enthusiastic young men who voluntarily strapped themselves to the carriage taking Nicolae Iorga home for his 50th birthday of 1921. Elsewhere, he comments on the physical traits of his first employer N. D. Cocea, with "his roguish appearance of a bald satyr, [...] whose always unruly locks of hair by the temples resembled horns." In recalling his meeting with Arghezi, Cioculescu stated having developed the same admiration as the late-19th-century youth for Eminescu, and went on to mention his "stunning" skills as a polemicist, which he believed were as good in conversation as they were in writing.

The account offers short characterizations of many other writers who crossed paths with Cioculescu, including critics such as Lovinescu (who "had the capacity to contain his feelings and maintain his smile") and Alexandru Rosetti ("of an unsettling beauty" and "a gentleman"), novelists such as Camil Petrescu (depicted as a megalomaniac) and Mihail Sorbul (whose appearance reportedly made a waiter think that he was exiled Soviet politico Leo Trotsky), poets such as Ion Barbu (who did most of his work in coffeehouses), Păstorel Teodoreanu (who had memorized and could recite over 500 lines from the poetry of Paul Verlaine). Among the more unusual aspects of his memoir pieces is their frank discussion of substance abuse and drug addiction among his colleagues, in particular Ion Barbu's heavy use of narcotics, inhalants and caffeine. In his depiction of Bucharest's bohemian scene, the author also sketches the portraits of writers Alexandru Cazaban, Victor Eftimiu, Oscar Lemnaru, Adrian Maniu, Ion Minulescu, Cezar Petrescu, Liviu Rebreanu, and of actor Puiu Iancovescu. The book includes recollections of many other literary figures whom Cioculescu befriended or was acquainted with, among them Constantin Beldie, Marthe Bibesco, Lucian Blaga, Pompiliu Constantinescu, Dinu Pillat, Tudor Șoimaru and Ionel Teodoreanu.

Several distinct episodes focus on the friendship between the author and Streinu. Cioculescu mentions his original encounter with the poet, which he likens to the first meeting between Caragiale (himself) and Eminescu (Streinu). He recounts that, as a result of this analogy, he began referring to his companion as "Făt Frumos of Teiu" (a pun on Streinu's native village and Eminescu's story Făt-Frumos din tei). The book discusses their common causes and their anti-fascism, but also recounts how, in private, they would frequently quarrel over literary issues: Cioculescu accused Streinu of letting his poet's mindset interfere with his critical judgment, and stood accused of being limited in recognizing the importance of metaphors. One such portion recounts Streinu's heated exchange with an Iron Guard member, allegedly occurring during the Legionary Rebellion. To the activist's claim that "for one thousand years, no one shall be talking about you", Streinu is said to have replied with irony: "Fine by me. They'll be talking afterward."

In his 2008 review of the volume, Săndulescu noted that the text omitted important details from its author's life. Given the date of completion, he describes as understandable that Cioculescu failed to mention facts about his anti-communist brother and his death in confinement, and believes it natural that the book does not include any detail about the critic's own affiliation with the anti-communist Dreptatea. However, he sees a bizarre tendency in that Amintiri skips over Cioculescu's time in Paris.

== Legacy ==
In George Călinescu's assessment, Cioculescu's formal politeness and "maximal protocol", while reaching the status of an "individual nuance", was also a direct influence of Streinu. According to Paul Cernat, Șerban Cioculescu's legacy, particularly in matter of "inquisitive" style, is foremost illustrated by his son Barbu Cioculescu. He believes the fundamental difference between them is that Cioculescu-son was a noted admirer of Mateiu Caragiale, to whom he dedicated several of his texts. Cioculescu's critical work and George Călinescu's attitudes were also formative instruments for the literary essays of poet Marin Sorescu.

On his 100th birthday in 2002, Șerban Cioculescu was commemorated through festivities held at the Museum of Romanian Literature in Bucharest; the place chosen for this was a conference hall where he had presided over several writers' reunions in the 1960s and 1970s. Among the many reprints of his works before and after the 1989 Revolution is a 2007 third edition of Amintiri, edited by Simona Cioculescu and accompanied by his travel writings. In 2009, she also edited a collected edition of his theater chronicles for Semnalul. Șerban Cioculescu's name was assigned to streets in Găești and Pitești, as well as to a private high school in Turnu Severin.
