= Radu Cioculescu =

Romanian writer and political activist (1901–1961)

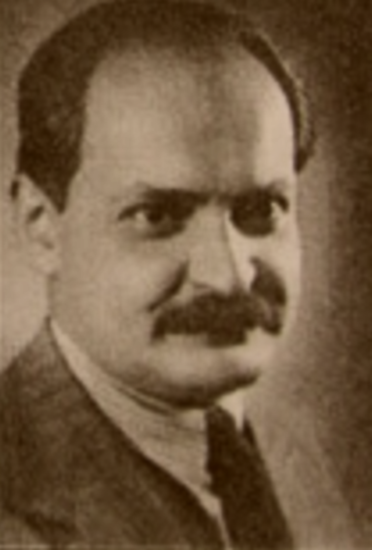
- Cioculescu in 1935
- Born: 20 February 1901; Turnu Severin, Kingdom of Romania
- Died: 9 January 1961 (aged 59); Aiud Prison, Cluj Region, Romanian People's Republic
- Other name: Popa Tigru
- Education: Cluj (Babeș-Bolyai) University; Vienna Conservatory
- Occupations: Essayist, critic, editor, translator, political activist, pianist, soldier
- Political party: National Peasants' Party (c. 1932–1933, 1940–1949); Radical Peasants' Party (1933)
- Spouse: Eugenia Babad
- Relatives: Șerban Cioculescu (younger brother); Barbu Cioculescu (nephew)

Radu Cioculescu (20 February 1901 – 9 January 1961) was a Romanian writer, editor, and political activist; he was the older brother of literary historian Șerban Cioculescu, and the uncle of poet and scholar Barbu Cioculescu. Orphaned early on, he fought as a child soldier in World War I, and, upon his return to civilian life, trained as a chemist. He settled on a careers as a musician and music critic, was for a while deputy director of the Romanian National Opera, and also achieved recognition as a translator—initially, with works of drama that were performed in Bucharest. During the interwar, Cioculescu also stated his organizational commitments to the Romanian Freemasonry, the PEN Club, and the National Peasants' Party (for a while, he deviated from the latter, joining the Radical Peasantists). He and his brother were brought on by Paul Zarifopol at the official literary magazine, Revista Fundațiilor Regale, entirely put out by Radu and Camil Petrescu in 1934–1940. In this environment, the Cioculescus resisted the growth of fascism and radical Romanian nationalism, and defended literary modernism, but, in 1938, also embraced the authoritarian tenets of the National Renaissance Front.

The Iron Guard, which took power in September 1940, sacked Cioculescu and persecuted his Jewish wife. He was afforded more recognition by Ion Antonescu, who toppled the Guardists in 1941, but still annoyed the authorities by refusing to renounce his Masonic allegiances and by criticizing Antonescu's support for Nazi Germany. Later that year, he was dispatched to a command post on the Eastern Front, where, while working on his translation of Marcel Proust's seven-volume novel, In Search of Lost Time, he documented the mass murder of Jews, as well as widespread looting by his fellow Romanians. Captain Cioculescu was arrested on the front and sent to Târgu Jiu internment camp; upon his release, he was reintegrated in government structures and allowed to work as a publishing adviser, but also kept under house arrest. He returned to public life immediately after the fall of Antonescu in August 1944, when he rejoined the National Peasantist caucus and took up party offices in Bucharest.

Cioculescu earned much acclaim for his Proustian translation, with the first two volumes issued in 1945. As manager and censor of the Bucharest Radio in the late 1940s, he helped form the National Radio Orchestra. He became publicly aligned with the Romanian Society for Friendship with the Soviet Union, but was increasingly anti-communist—still allowing the airwaves to be used by critics of the Romanian Communist Party. Despite the latter's dominant position in government, Cioculescu managed to obtain a position in the Arts Ministry, where he placed curbs on acts of political retaliation. When a Romanian communist regime was finally established in 1947–1948, he joined the resistance movement; he was pursued by the Securitate and finally apprehended in 1949. He was then sentenced for various crimes, including high treason, but continued to express his dissidence after incarceration, and was rated by his wardens as one of the more stubborn inmates. He survived re-education attempts at Aiud, but ultimately died, of colorectal cancer and other afflictions, in 1961. His In Search of Lost Time was published in installments during the 1960s and 1970s, though some of these had to be entirely rewritten by his widow, the opera singer Eugenia Babad, with support from his nephew.

== Biography ==
=== Early life ===
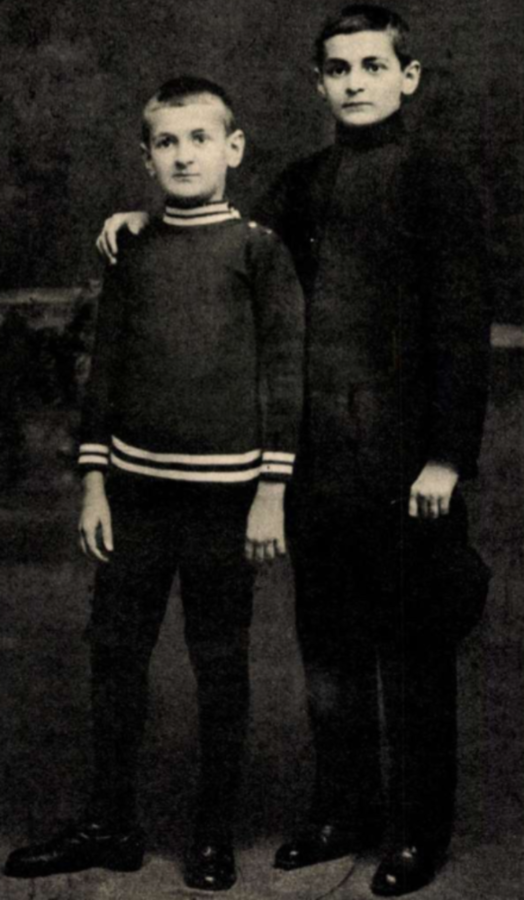
Radu and Șerban Cioculescu in January 1913

Cioculescu was born in the Danube port of Turnu Severin, on 20 February 1901. His mother, Constanța née Miloteanu, was a homemaker, and Nicolae Cioculescu, a naval engineer. On the paternal side, the future translator descended from Romanian peasants in Mehedinți County (where the family, like virtually all inhabitants, owned its own plot of land). Before taking up engineering, Nicolae had had literary ambitions, writing and publishing his own poetry. The couple also had a younger son, Șerban, born in Bucharest, capital of the Romanian Kingdom, on 7 September 1902. The boys grew up in the opulent house that the Cioculescus had built themselves in Turnu Severin, learning German from a private tutor and French from their parents. Their childhood changed its idyllic course when Nicolae and Constanța both died, around the time of World War I. During the subsequent invasion of Romania, Radu served as a Boy Scout, in which capacity he assisted the Romanian Land Forces, withdrawing with them into Western Moldavia. His friend Nicolae Carandino recounts that, throughout the interwar, when he was a reserve sub-lieutenant, Cioculescu applied for advanced military training. As Carandino writes, "he showed up for any set date without consideration for his time, his personal affairs, or his tiredness. He was natural-born 'volunteer', from that rare breed of 'volunteers' who seek neither reward nor publicity."

Șerban credited Radu as a prodigy musician, noting that he himself never liked music—which simply put him to sleep. The brothers were further separated by their education and career choices: Radu graduated from Bucharest's Mihai Viteazul Lyceum, then majored in chemistry at Cluj (Babeș-Bolyai) University, whereas Șerban attended Traian National College, then studied letters at the University of Bucharest. Though offered employment as an assistant professor in his chosen field, Radu was still primarily interested in music. He followed up with piano training at the Vienna Conservatory.

Returning by 1930, the elder Cioculescu was appointed deputy director of the Romanian National Opera; in 1934, he served in a similar capacity for the Bucharest Philharmonic Orchestra. During August 1931, Marioara Ventura's company was rehearsing Cioculescu's translation of Valentin Kataev's Squaring the Circle. Later that year, the same venue used his versions of English plays, done from the original: J. M. Barrie's Charwomen and the War or The Old Lady Shows her Medals, and W. Somerset Maugham's Letter. Cioculescu was at the time also the theatrical manager of the troupe, in which capacity he pulled a prank on his actor, Ion Iancovescu (who was himself a famous prankster). In April 1932, alongside Haig Acterian, Petru Comarnescu and Corneliu Moldovanu, he appeared at a public venue to defend young Romanian drama and film against critical remarks by Ion Gorun.

Cioculescu was a self-reported atheist. Initiated early on into the Romanian Freemasonry, from which he retained a passion for occult practices, he was a founder of the Meșterul Manole Lodge, also enlisting writer Victor Eftimiu. He was additionally a registered member of the National Peasants' Party (PNȚ) in Ilfov County since at least May 1932, when the group's leadership asked him to communicate his new mailing address. In November of that year, he signed his name to an anti-censorship platform, defending Panait Mușoiu, a doyen of Romanian anarchism whose book had reportedly been banned by the authorities; other signatories included Acterian, Comarnescu, Eugen Jebeleanu, Alexandru Sahia, Sandu Tudor, and Petre Țuțea. For a while around March 1933, he joined Grigore Iunian's breakaway group, the "Radical Peasants' Party" (PȚR), announcing that he would edit its newspaper, Deșteptarea. In May, he was elected to the PȚR central committee in Bucharest's Green Sector.

Cioculescu resented the creation of Nazi Germany, and his initial gesture of opposition was in refusing to accept any tickets to the Berlin Philharmonic. In December 1933, upon establishing the official literary magazine, Revista Fundațiilor Regale, Paul Zarifopol selected him as his editorial secretary. His work there became tinged by controversy after Zarifopol's death in 1934. According to Veghea newspaper, he had installed himself as chief editor, and was using this position to publish literary columns by his brother, which made the family significantly richer at the state's expense. The right-wing publicist Dinu Buzdugan likewise noted in April 1935 that, in their work at Revista Fundațiilor Regale, the two Cioculescus were "not up to the challenge of the times". Buzdugan described Radu's activity as "forever absent-minded". In a 1972 interview, Șerban argued that Radu had not wanted to be accused of nepotism, and that he himself had been invited to the magazine by Zarifopol personally. The initial panning was also contrasted by philologist Ion Hangiu, who argued in 1999 that Radu Cioculescu and his editorial associate, Camil Petrescu, had established Revista Fundațiilor Regale as a "European-level publication."

=== Against fascism ===
At some point in the 1930s, Radu Cioculescu penned and published his translation of Warwick Deeping's Sorrell and Son. In 1935, he printed his version of Jakob Wassermann's Bula Matari: Das Leben Stanleys, and the next year a rendition of Mirko Jelusich's Don Juan: Die sieben Todsünden. In September 1935, Cioculescu replaced dramatist Ion Sân-Giorgiu as secretary of the local PEN Club, serving as such to 1940; in that context, he also became a musical columnist at Vremea and other periodicals. During November 1935, he openly mocked Jonel Perlea, the Opera's new music director, with an open letter addressed to Alexandru Lapedatu (then serving as titular minister). The text was noted by the columnists at Facla, since it showed a "remarkable talent for lampoons", shaped under apparent influences from Tudor Arghezi (who was Șerban Cioculescu's favorite author). He was diversifying his activities: elected one of five vice presidents of the Romanian Association of the Periodical Press in April 1937, in October he lectured on Bucharest Radio about the Salzburg Festival.

In various ways, Radu Cioculescu discussed the radicalization of Romanian nationalism, reaching out to other critics of the phenomenon. In May 1935, he interviewed the Hungarian opinion-maker, Miklós Bánffy, regarding the emergence of a Romanian Front, which advanced ethnic discrimination. Bánffy laughed off his concerns, noting that Romania's population was "so very decent"—Romanians, Bánffy argued, would not even chase dogs away from a sidewalk, let alone minorities from their workplaces. By mid-1936, Cioculescu had publicly censured a former female friend who had signed up to a nationalist platform in the right-wing daily, Universul. Commenting on these developments, his Jewish friend, Mihail Sebastian, argued: "[Cioculescu is] a strange man. He is probably the only radical Romanian in existence." Cioculescu had married Eugenia Babad, a mezzo-soprano. Born in Bălți in May 1920, she was of Bessarabian Jewish heritage and did not speak Romanian as her first language.

In March 1937, Cioculescu was lambasted by Nicolae Georgescu-Cocoș of Neamul Românesc daily, who described him as a member of the "infected 'Symbolist' gang", and as such a modernist infiltrator at Revista Fundațiilor Regale. Georgescu-Cocoș was upset that a "mediocre translator" had been selected to represent the journal at the inauguration of a Mihai Eminescu monument in Oradia Mare, especially since the editorial staff included "five high-ranking professors [and] three writers of distinction", all of whom he believed were better suited for the occasion. The same month, Cioculescu joined a literary and political circle headed by Iunian, and named after a leftist doctrinaire, Constantin Stere. On the far-right, the National Christian Party denounced this new group as a front for the Freemasonry. In April, Universul revisited Bula Matari as a "libertine" book, expressing displeasure that such texts had been vetted by the Royal Foundations.

Radu and Eugenia Cioculescu could no longer attend their favorite Salzburg Festivals after the Nazi annexation of Austria. Under the National Renaissance Front (FRN) regime, established by King Carol II in 1938, Radu remained at Revista Fundațiilor Regale, which now formally adhered to the single-party line. In October 1938, he and Apostol D. Culea signed a document that requested support from the FRN in setting up a network of cultural venues in Ținutul Mureș. He was mainly a cultural figure—on 21 May, he began a steady collaboration, as a musical columnist, with Zaharia Stancu's new paper, Lumea Românească; in June, he attended the PEN congress in Czechoslovakia, and lectured on children's literature; in July, he became a shareholder of a consortium that published Gazeta Sporturilor, with an initial investment of 10,000 lei. With the looming threat of war on Romania's borders, he was also called up under arms during summer 1938. His friend Leon Kalustian notes that Cioculescu and Păstorel Teodoreanu were equally enthusiastic about the events, and loved to appear in uniform even when attending civilian functions.

The FRN regime tolerated a settling of scores between the partisans of literary modernism, grouped around Arghezi, and the nationalists, represented foremost by Nicolae Iorga (who was also patron of Neamul Românesc). Revista Fundațiilor Regale sided with the former group; at a time when Arghezian literature was being branded as "pornographic", Cioculescu and Petrescu reportedly stumbled upon a sample of Iorga's poems, which contained references to potency and erections. After authenticating it, they issues a veiled threat to Iorga, suggesting that they were ready to publish the piece. Iorga complied with their implicit demands, and stopped his attacks on the group. In 1940, Cioculescu published two new translations: André Maurois' Dialogue sur le commandement and August von Spiess' Jagden in Afrika. At Revista Fundațiilor Regale, he had to deal with curbs on artistic freedoms: in January 1940, he was told to remove portions from Eugen Lovinescu's serialized memoirs, since these dealt with military affairs. He was also a direct participant in Carol's personality cult, directing the June issue in which various literary figures extolled the king as an exponent of enlightened absolutism.

=== Against Antonescu ===
Cioculescu was still opposed to fascism—and then to the totalitarian regime formed around Ion Antonescu upon Carol's ouster later that year. Antonescu initially agreed to share power with the green-shirted Iron Guard (in the "National Legionary State"), which was especially resented by the Cioculescus. Radu lost his job at Revista Fundațiilor Regale in September 1940. Also then, the wholesale introduction of "Romanianization", targeting Jews and other minorities, resulted in his wife being sacked from the National Opera. Returning to the PNȚ as a figure on its more leftist side, Radu rejoiced when "the green beast" was ousted from power in January 1941, claiming to have personally witnessed acts of extreme cruelty as committed by the Guardists. At Batiștei Church on 1 March 1941, he attended a parastas for the PNȚ man Virgil Madgearu, who had been assassinated by the Guard in November 1940. Cioculescu was however increasingly critical of Antonescu himself, in particular since the latter had fully embraced the anti-Masonic agenda dictated by Nazi Germany. He himself refused to denounce the Freemasons when directly pressured and warned by minister Ion Petrovici. In his mocking reply, he reportedly told Petrovici: "How could I ever part with such a productive cash cow?"

By June 1941, when Romania entered the anti-Soviet war, Cioculescu was a captain in the artillery reserve. He was immediately sent on the Eastern Front, either as part of a general mobilization or by special punitive order. He combined his tasks as head of a military transport column with his passion for translation. He was now fully dedicated to Marcel Proust's large novel, In Search of Lost Time, and would type his rendition whenever he found the time. In November 1941, while mainly transporting ammunition to the front, he took command of a military postal service in Novi Shompole; he had several Romanian Germans under his direct supervision, including the "very cheerful and agreeable" former international footballer Nicolae Reuter, who "sometimes cooks for me."

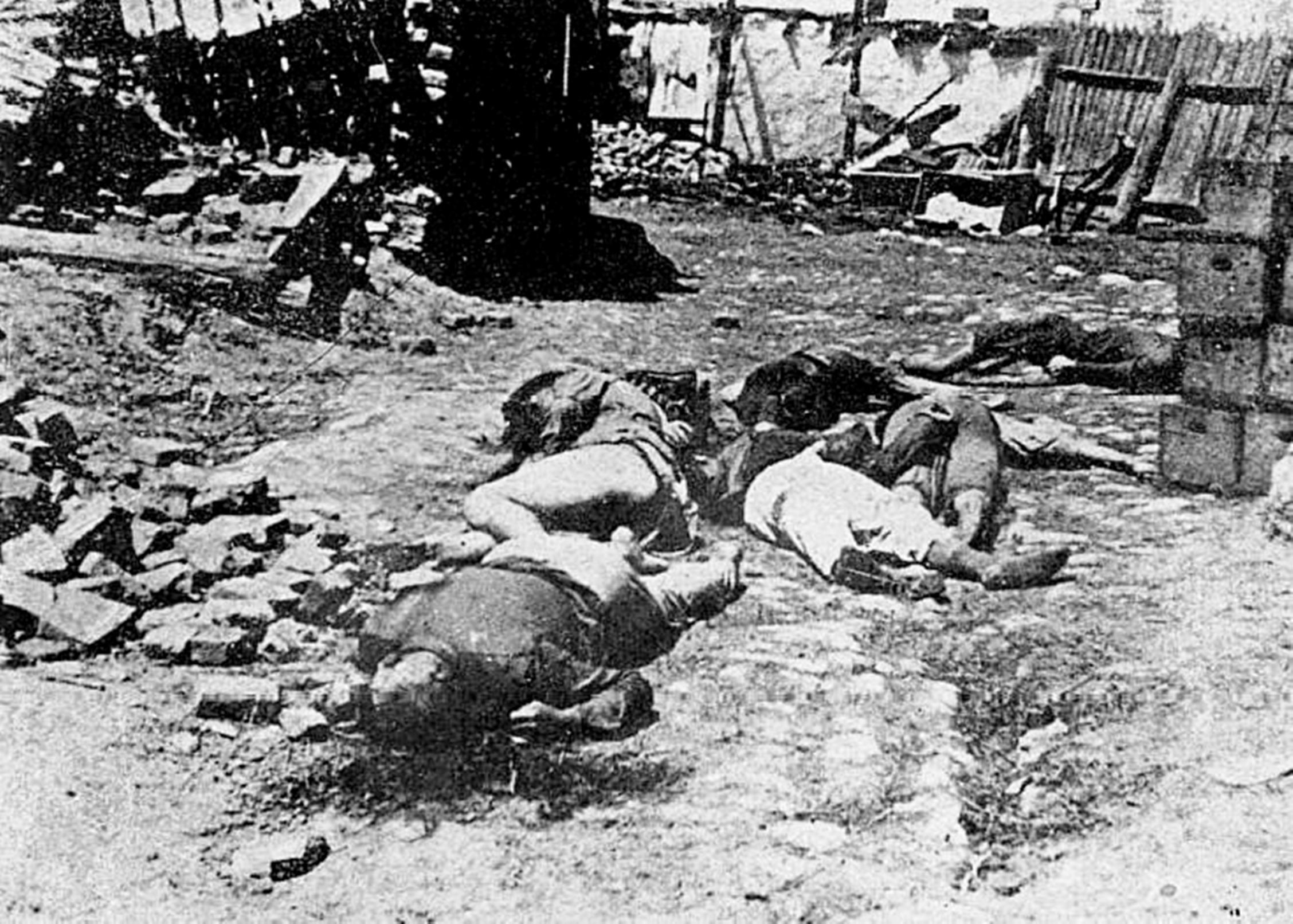
Jewish victims of a massacre in Transnistria Governorate (October 1941)

The locality served to supply Romanian troops that had fought in the Siege of Odessa. As he noted in a letter to his PNȚ colleague Aurel Buteanu, the battle had been a Pyrrhic victory, marked by incompetence and mass desertions on the Romanian side. This posting also allowed him to witness firsthand the massacres of Jews in Transnistria Governorate—specifically, the aftermath of the Odessa Pogrom; he wrote about the bloodshed in his Buteanu letter, which he hoped would also reach the PNȚ chairman Iuliu Maniu, and which was later used as a historical record by Holocaust historians. He reported therein on the "sadistic glee" with which fellow Romanian soldiers were shooting off Jewish toddlers who could not keep up on the death march; he claimed to have tried intervening to stop the murders, only to be told by a supervising lieutenant that doing so would result in his being labeled unpatriotic.

The Buteanu letter shows Cioculescu being impressed by the relative wealth achieved in the Ukrainian SSR as a result of Imperial Russian and Soviet traditions. He noted that the local villages abounded in purebreds, and also that the local theater in Blahoіeve was bigger than the Regina Maria venue of central Bucharest. The text mentions his shock at the widespread looting of regular homes, with the added musing: "for sure, ours is a country of thieves, and theft is deeply ingrained within our nation." He himself made a point of feeding the men under his command, but did so by purchasing meat from the locals and grinding flour in their homes. As an Anglophile, Cioculescu also believed that Nazi "haughtiness" had pushed Britain into an unnatural alliance with the Soviet Union. His verdict (in turn seen by historian Florin Constantiniu as remarkably out-of-touch) was that "England, who has not tolerated a German-Nazi hegemony on the European mainland, will similarly never tolerate a Russian-communist one."

Cioculescu was publicly opposed to the war effort, particularly since the campaigns had continued beyond the Romanian-inhabited regions of Bessarabia and Bukovina. The Antonescu regime ordered him arrested directly from the front—as noted by his nephew Barbu Cioculescu, this order unwittingly saved his uncle from near-certain death at Stalingrad. The deposed captain was held in Târgu Jiu internment camp during one winter (1941–1942), being reunited there with journalist colleagues such as Stancu, Emanoil Socor, and Scarlat Froda; Arghezi was also deported there, but later. The group was held in close proximity to repressed Guardists. According to Stancu's memoirs, Cioculescu openly stated his hatred for those inmates, informing them that a coming democratic regime would make sure to have them beheaded. The time in confinement witnessed the first contacts between Cioculescu and the Romanian Communist Party (PCR). These were initially friendly: reportedly, communist leader Gheorghe Gheorghiu-Dej stood by as Cioculescu spoke about Proust, and memorized enough of these informal lecture so as to form a general idea about Proustian literature.

=== August 1944 coup and transition era ===
Obtaining support from nominal ideological adversaries in the Antonescian apparatus (primarily including Petre Strihan and Mircea Vulcănescu), Cioculescu was eventually released. He was for a while a subordinate of General Constantin S. Constantin, the Under-Secretary of State for Army and Civilian Supply. He resurfaced, in October 1942, as an editorial adviser for Moderna publishers. He was still active there a year later, when he was interviewed by Ladmiss Alexandrescu regarding his editorial policy. In that context, Cioculescu noted that he was interested in promoting young Romanian authors (for which he had requested a state sponsorship)—while also putting out classic Anglo-Saxon novels by George Eliot, Herman Melville, Mary Webb, and Oscar Wilde. By early 1944, he had vetted Daphne du Maurier's Jamaica Inn, in Constantin Apostol's translation. The edition was mocked by several reviewers, who described Apostol's rendition as outstandingly unprofessional.

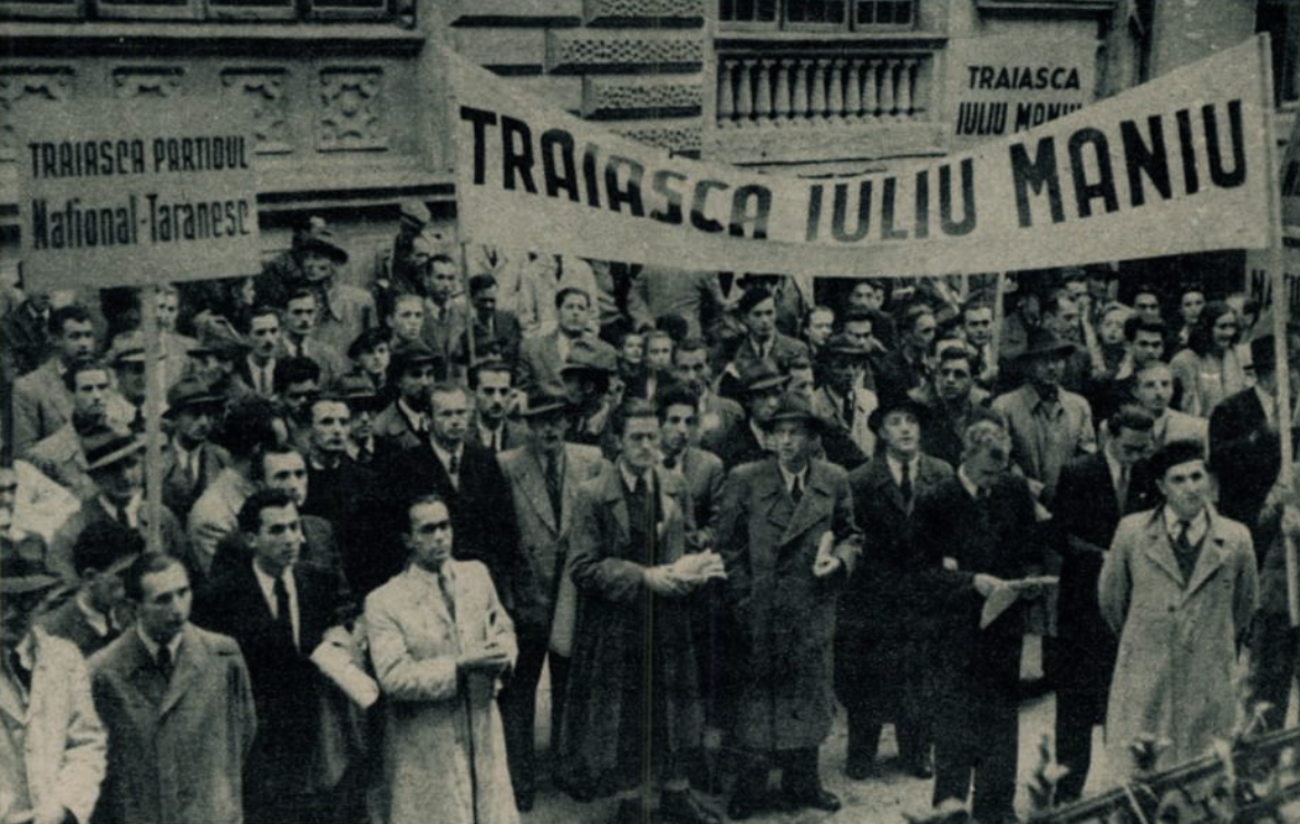
October 1944 demonstration by the PNȚ youth, expressing support for party leader Iuliu Maniu

On 26 January 1943, the Antonescu regime had officially placed Cioculescu on a list of Romanian and Jewish intellectuals who had been engaged in "public disturbance", and ordered him placed under house arrest. Cioculescu's career took off during the late stages of World War II, specifically after the PNȚ-backed anti-fascist coup of 23 August 1944 and the onset of Soviet occupation. In September, the democratic regime made him press officer of the Ministry of National Economy. Again affiliated with the PNȚ, he became one of the few Old-Kingdom figures to be trusted by the Transylvanian Maniu. On 9 September, he was voted in as vice president of the party's Black Sector section, also tasked with organizing party activity in that sector's 17th precinct. On 20 September, he attended a party gathering in Principele Nicolae suburb. In tandem, he was appointed as administrator of the Standard Insurance Society, but lost that position within days following a review by the Sănătescu cabinet.

From 21 September 1944, Radu Cioculescu was also included on the censorship board of the Romanian cinema industry, which was presided upon by Richard Hillard and fell under the Foreign Ministry. The following week, he participated in a general meeting of Romanian and foreign journalists, where he represented the PNȚ's central daily, Dreptatea. In October, he also joined George Macovescu and Ștefan Voitec on the administration board of the national radio company, ensuring that it would clamp down on fascist collaborators. Here, Cioculescu established the National Radio Orchestra, which he would later regard as his greatest achievement in life. He maintained his official position to 1946, while also serving as artistic adviser of the National Opera (1945–1947). From December 1944, he accepted an assignment from the Romanian Society for Friendship with the Soviet Union (ARLUS)—becoming librarian of its Radio Propaganda Section. According to literary historian Geo Șerban, his presence at ARLUS, where he also gave one lecture on Dmitri Shostakovich, was a way of holding back the looming communist repression, but ultimately failed to shield him.

During early 1945, Cioculescu served briefly as deputy director in the State Secretariat for Army and Civilian Supplies, before being sent in June to be government inspector of the Arts Ministry, in the Musical Section. Also then, he lectured at Sala Dalles about the life and work of Leoš Janáček, with musical numbers performed by some of Bucharest's leading operatic artists. Cioculescu became widely acclaimed in 1945, when he put out the first two parts of In Search of Lost Time—with a preface by scholar Tudor Vianu, who noted his gratitude that Cioculescu had "preserve[d] everywhere the graces and subtleties [of Proust]". According to the same critic, the translation came as "a uniquely and decisively significant literary phenomenon." Similarly, the ARLUS paper Vestea Nouă described Cioculescu's effort as "nearly flawless". The work also carried an introduction by Antoine Bibesco, who provided memoirs of his direct encounters with the French novelist. To less acclaim, Cioculescu also penned a 1946 rendition of Pierre Choderlos de Laclos' 18th-century novel, Les Liaisons dangereuses.

In that context, Cioculescu had his first major clash with the increasingly dominant PCR. At the national radio, he allowed a speech by the deposed Premier, Nicolae Rădescu, to be broadcast nationally—thus giving Romanians a chance to hear Rădescu's warnings about the rise of Soviet-and-communist influence. In tandem, he and his party colleague, Nicolae Carandino, made repeated efforts to prevent Victor Eftimiu, who had been appointed chairman of the National Theater Bucharest, from politically persecuting the actors and dramatists. By January 1946, Cioculescu was serving with Carandino, Gabriel Țepelea and Ion Vinea on the PNȚ Press Committee, which discussed new legislation targeting newspapers. Speaking at the PNȚ workers' rally in Obor, held on 10 February 1946, he declared that his was "the only Romanian party to have always kept up with democratic principles." In tandem, he affirmed the PNȚ's commitment to "social justice", explaining that its methods for achieving this were nonviolent, and as such distinct from the PCR had proposed.

=== Anti-communist resistance and capture ===
Though continuously and publicly lambasted by communist musicians Mihail Andricu and Matei Socor, Cioculescu maintained his office at the Ministry of Arts in the PCR-dominated Groza cabinet. In early May 1946, the titular minister, Mihai Ralea, sent him to Cluj, where he was tasked with classifying teachers for the Hungarian Music Academy; in that context, he restated his respect for the Hungarian community, and personally visited with Gyárfás Kurkó, who was serving as national chairman of the Hungarian People's Union. He returned to the city later that month, when, as secretary of the revived PEN Club, he oversaw the creation of a Hungarian writers' section.

The period of campaigning for the November general elections also witnessed renewed conflicts between PCR and PNȚ activists. At a Bucharest rally held on 29 August, Cioculescu compared the PCR-led Bloc of Democratic Parties to the previous fascist regimes, optimistically arguing that, like these, the communists would end up being defeated. In October, he appeared before the Romanian People's Tribunal as a defense witness for General Constantin, who was being accused of having committed spoliation under Antonescu's rule. In his deposition, he argued that the defendant had actively sabotaged the Nazi war machine, to the best of his abilities. The election eventually resulted in a consolidation of communist power, which itself led up to the PNȚ's outlawing. For a while, Radu Cioculescu was preserved as a general inspector in the government structures of the revamped Groza cabinet—in March 1947, he was in Timișoara, where, in addition to his official duties, he lectured about the prospects of Czech music. In April, he attended a Bucharest gala show by the tenor Viorel Chicideanu, whom he then presented with the Meritul Cultural decoration on behalf of the young Romanian king, Michael I. The same month, he himself became a knight second class of Meritul Cultural. The Cioculescu family felt the brunt of communist censorship the same year, when Barbu's debut novel, Steaua Păstorului, was not vetted for publishing.

At age 47, Radu Cioculescu was already living on his pension. In October 1947, the Union of Professional Journalists expelled him from its ranks, alleging that he had supported anti-union and anti-democratic policies, as an agent of "internal and external reactionary circles." A local communist regime was formally set up around New Years' Day, pushing him into the clandestine resistance movement. He still nominally served as head of the PNȚ in the Black Sector, and preserved the secret organization as an active chapter of the party, claiming that he had the blessings of the exiled King Michael and General Rădescu. To this end, in 1948 he approached several former activists with offers to join him. Some, including the lawyer Paul Ionescu-Voiculescu, refused him, but did not betray the network to the authorities. Aware that he was being pursued by Securitate agents, he tried going into hiding in Transylvania, working on a construction site, but then returned to Bucharest. Barbu also notes that he and his uncle once visited the astrologer Armand Constantinescu, who made a surprising guess regarding the resistance movement—telling Radu that he should never pause his "hidden activity", for any interruption would result in his being apprehended. Barbu himself was brought into the Freemasonry by his uncle, on 9 April 1948, just ahead of a new ban on Masonic activities.

Radu Cioculescu was additionally involved, alongside writer Nicolae Steinhardt, in typing and circulating manifestos that were meant to be read by foreign observers. The Securitate continued to look for him. During one related search "of the neighborhood", it discovered that actors Titus Lapteș and Ion Ulmeni had preserved copies of Mihai Eminescu's Doina, a proscribed nationalist poems, and arrested them both. Following an anonymous tip in 1949, Cioculescu was apprehended alongside twenty-six members of his network, including the poet and diplomat Ștefan I. Nenițescu. Barbu was present exactly as his uncle was being handcuffed, and heard him shout, in cryptic manner: Cine pierde câștigă! ("He who loses wins!"). The mass arrests omitted Steinhardt, whom Cioculescu refused to name as his accomplice; Steinhardt, who noted this omission, was always grateful to him as his protector. Cioculescu's brother was also detained in August 1949, based on his own past with the PNȚ, but released days later for lack of evidence. Eugenia, meanwhile, had been forced to retire from the Romanian Opera in July 1948.

=== Trial, illness, death ===
Radu Cioculescu was eventually put on trial for various crimes, including high treason. On 26 July 1950, judge Alexandru Petrescu sentenced him to 15 years of hard labor for this charge; he also received 10 years for "conspiracy against the social order", 5 years of strict incarceration for conspiracy, and 1 year of regular prison for forgery of official documents. He was called up as a witness for the prosecution in Ionescu-Voiculescu's 1953 trial, but refused to show up—thus forcing the Securitate to only submit a lesser charge for the defendant. He was himself incarcerated in Aiud Prison, where he was included in a re-education experiment overseen by the Securitate's Alexandru Nicolschi. In the Aiud version, it reportedly included mock executions. A fellow prisoner who wished to only be identified as "N. C." attested that one such incident, coming before the May Day celebrations, involved Cioculescu and himself, alongside eight other prisoners (among them Petrovici, Nichifor Crainic, Constantin Motaș, and General Florin Rădulescu). They were dragged through the dark courtyard for some thirty minutes, over several nights, and on each occasion were told to prepare for their own shooting.

During his time at Aiud, Cioculescu became a target for continuous surveillance by the Securitate, which placed informants in his cell. As these noted in the first half of 1952, he had "high morale" and was popular with the other inmates, for whom he interpreted the news, and whom he assured that the PNȚ would eventually return to power. Three years later, Radu received a visit from his brother, which is described in some detail by Barbu Cioculescu, as well as by the eyewitness Ion Ioanid. Reportedly, though he was by then ill with pneumonia, Radu chided Șerban for having managed to look "worse off then me". When he added "even though you're on the outside", the warden intervened to stop the conversation. Eventually set free during a retrial in September 1955, Cioculescu was rearrested within a new wave of political repression. Shortly before the Hungarian Revolution of 1956, his presence was attested at Jilava Prison. This coincided with a relative détente, which saw prisoners being allowed various perks, such as growing facial hair. Cioculescu followed suit, and could be seen sporting a goatee. He was mocked by a prison guard, who compared him to Popa Leu—with which name he designated the dissident bishop Vasile Leu, whose family name means "lion". In his retort, Cioculescu referred to himself as Popa Tigru ("The Tiger Priest"), which became his nickname.

Upon meeting the literary critic and fellow inmate Nicolae Balotă, Radu came to express hopes that the regime would pardon them "in batches". As his interlocutor notes, any such prospects were quickly dashed when the wardens stormed in and proceeded to beat them with their batons. The regimen only improved in caloric terms, as the inmates were now served a bitter but nutritious green tomatoes, which was standard-issue for common-law offenders. During such meals, Balotă observed that Cioculescu was secretly ailing, unable to finish his serving; her distracted his elder friend by asking him to discuss music. Cioculescu was later held at Aiud alongside another critic, Adrian Marino, with whom he discussed politics. As reported by Marino, he was disappointed in having to share the space with former members of the Iron Guard and of his own PNȚ, since these figures "vibrate for the national idea, but not at all for the democratic idea" (an observation that Marino retained as his own motto). The translator was also in Pitești Prison, where the Securitate opened another surveillance file on him in January 1958. It named him as a "fanatical" anti-communist who looked forward to an American invasion; Securitate agents set themselves the task of identifying his proselytes. At Pitești, Cioculescu was sharing a cell with Balotă, talking to him Proust—and about his own hope that he would finish In Search of Lost Time upon the end of his sentence.

According to several sources, Cioculescu spent his final days in Aiud, though some biographers have the nearby Dej Prison. His death, registered on 9 January 1961, is attributed by the other Cioculescus to an underlying colorectal cancer, for which he had been operated in 1960. The death certificate includes other proximate causes, namely a partial bowel obstruction and a pulmonary heart disease, in turn related to his tuberculosis and lung abscess. It also reports on his comorbidities, namely hepatitis, colitis, and muscular dystrophy. The family preserved evidence that, overall, he was severely malnourished. As noted by Barbu in 2001: "We trust that the sachet of bones, which we have presented as Radu Cioculescu's remains, and which how rests in the family crypt, is him indeed. The bones are, in any case, those of some martyr, buried in a mass grave, with no identifier attached to them."

== Legacy ==
During his episode on the outside, Cioculescu had actually managed to resume work on the remaining Proustian volumes, and these were almost ready for print. For decades, the censorship apparatus gave no thought to publishing them, in large part because it rejected all manifestation of literary modernism. The manuscripts were left to be finished by his widow Eugenia, then further polished by his nephew. An updated version of the 1945 edition came in 1968, at Editura pentru literatură. The subsequent volumes, credited partly or completely to Eugenia, were issued by Editura Minerva in 1977. This authorship issue came about because Radu's original versions from the two closing sections (The Fugitive and Finding Time Again) were lost or destroyed in separate incidents. Both had to be partly redone, partly reconstructed from memory, by his wife. The latter also handled his commemoration in January 1976. She herself died in Bucharest on 26 December 1986.

Though greatly affected by his brother's death, Șerban refused to let others gauge his own suffering. When he wrote his memoirs under the liberalized communist regime, he made only oblique mentions of Radu, and entirely omitted his own time in the PNȚ. Such ambiguities led an exiled critic, Virgil Ierunca, to compare him unfavorably with Radu himself, within the larger accusation that Șerban was a collaborator of the Securitate. The latter institution had since toned down its violence, but always maintained an interest in the Cioculescus' Masonic connections: in 1966, it visited Barbu, questioned him about his and his deceased uncle's roles in the organization, and politely warned him not to engage with the liberal malcontents. Though the family was allowed to win back its cultural status during the regime's later stages, when Șerban in particular was cultivated as a scholar and polemicist, they always preserved their anti-communist views. In a 1981 letter to his younger colleague Eugen Simion, Șerban observes: "I cannot love this century, engulfed by innocent blood. [...] We have killed God and have then replaced Him with macabre political fantasies."

While honored by Carandino in a 1982 article (calling his friend "the victim of his own rectitude"), Radu Cioculescu was never formally rehabilitated during the regime's existence. Meanwhile, Irina Mavrodin was producing a new Proustian translation, done as a scientific edition and published in installments from 1987 to 2000. According to scholar Marina Vazaca, it is at times inferior to the Cioculescu editions—though the latter preserves "editorial intrusions that were likely meant to lull ideological sensitivities." That issue was acknowledged by Barbu, who confessed that The Fugitive could never have been printed without "cuts" in the text—specifically, all mention of Albetine's "erotic kinks". Following the Romanian Revolution of 1989, Barbu became editor of the revived Dreptatea, which served the Christian Democratic National Peasants' Party. Radu Cioculescu and his fate could now be openly discussed. In a 2012 interview, scholar George Ardeleanu described the "unforgivable oblivion that surrounds Radu Cioculescu's name", noting that his opposition to communism should have granted him heroic status. In December 2013, the reestablished PEN Club, through its member Romulus Rusan, paid him homage as a founding figure.
