= Paul Zarifopol =

Romanian literary and social critic, essayist and literary historian (1874–1934)

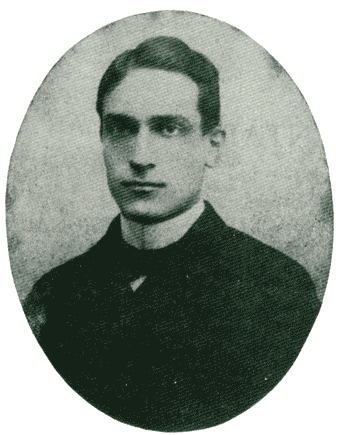
- Zarifopol as an Institutele-Unite student, 1891
- Born: November 30, 1874; Iași, Principality of Romania
- Died: May 1, 1934 (aged 59); Bucharest, Kingdom of Romania
- Other names: Anton Gherman, Z.
- Spouse: Ștefania Dobrogeanu-Gherea
- Children: 2
- Parents: Paul Zarifopol (father); Elena Culiano (mother)

Academic background
- Education: University of Iași; University of Halle
- Thesis: Kritischer Text der Lieder Richards de Fournival (1904)
- Doctoral advisor: Hermann Suchier
- Other advisor: Alois Riehl
- Influences: Nikolai Berdyaev; Henri Brémond; Ion Luca Caragiale; Titu Maiorescu; Stéphane Mallarmé; Alois Riehl; Paul Valéry

Academic work
- Era: 20th century
- School or tradition: Rationalism; neo-Kantianism; aestheticism
- Main interests: Sociology of literature; aesthetics; philology; poetics; Romanian literature; medieval literature; phenomenology; social criticism
- Influenced: Alexandru Paleologu; Mihail Sebastian

Paul Zarifopol (November 30, 1874 – May 1, 1934) was a Romanian literary and social critic, essayist, and literary historian. The scion of an aristocratic family, formally trained in both philology and the sociology of literature, he emerged in the 1910s as a rebel, highly distinctive, voice among the Romanian press and book reviewers. He was a confidant and publisher of the Romanian writer Ion Luca Caragiale, building his theories on Caragiale's already trenchant appraisals of Romanian society and culture. Zarifopol defended art for art's sake even against the Marxism of his father-in-law, Constantin Dobrogeanu-Gherea, and the Poporanism of his friend, Garabet Ibrăileanu. He was also a noted censurer of neoclassical trends, of philistinism, and of inauthentic customs, advocating renewal, but not revolution. A skeptic reviewer of modernist literature, he reemerged during the interwar period as its dedicated promoter, but his preference for literary entertainment over substance and many of his literary bets were shortly dismissed by other experts of the day.

Zarifopol endures in cultural memory as an eccentric—not just because he tackled and derided the literary establishment, but also because he refused to publish most of his work in book form, or take up employment in academia. Having lost a considerable fortune, he lived withdrawn from the public eye, surviving on his revenues as a literary columnist, mostly for Ibrăileanu's Viața Românească. Shortly before his death, he set up his own successful magazine, Revista Fundațiilor Regale. In such venues, Zarifopol defended his cosmopolitan philosophy against other philologists, but also against the emerging neotraditionalists at Gândirea journal. Zarifopol viewed modern traditionalism as a fabrication and, with his essays, came out as a non-traditionalist and anti-totalitarian conservative thinker.

== Biography ==
=== Origins and early life ===
The future critic was born in Iași to Paul (Pavel) Zarifopol, or "Zarifopoulo", and his wife Elena (née Culiano). His paternal family had attested Greek, and more generically "southern" or Balkan, roots. Originally horse traders and assignees for Ottoman Turks settled in Moldavia, they were elevated into the Moldavian boyar nobility after 1850.

On his mother's Culiano side, Paul was related to prestigious literary and political figures. One of Elena's brothers was Nicolae Culianu, the boyar, astronomer, and doyen of the Junimea literary society, great-grandfather of the religious scholar-novelist Ioan Petru Culianu. His other maternal uncle, who remained closest to Elena, was jurist Ștefan "Nei" Stamatiu-Culianu, also a Junimea man. A sister of theirs, Maria Nanu, was the wife of landowner Gheorghe Nanu—making Paul Jr a first cousin of poet D. Nanu.

The elder Zarifopol managed the estates of Moldavian Prince Mihail Sturdza in Cristești. It was there that he and Elena met. According to scholar Elena Vulcănescu, it is possible that Paul Jr was not his natural son, but born to Elena from a liaison with General Grigore Sturdza, heir to the Sturdza estate. Zarifopol eventually bought for himself the baroque manor and Sturdza property at Cârligi, near Roman, then a townhouse in Iași, where he and Stamatiu-Culianu managed Borta Rece tavern. His brothers George and Ștefan Zarifopol both had careers in local politics—the former, a Paris-trained agronomist, as a Prefect, the latter as a delegate to Chamber. Paul Sr was the great-uncle of poet Dimitrie Anghel; another of his nephews, Alexandru Zarifopol, was the adoptive father of writer Alexandru Paleologu.

Paul Sr died in 1881, leaving Stamatiu in charge of family affairs. Their family fortune helped finance both sides of the family, and the Culianu children were all educated abroad. Paul Jr himself graduated from Junimea's Institutele-Unite private high school, followed by the literature faculty of the University of Iași, from 1892 to 1898. In his later years, he noted that the professors he met in school and at university had provided the most important contributions to his literary and moral outlook. He made his published debut in Alexandru Dimitrie Xenopol's Arhiva in 1897, with a review of a historiographic work by Marie Henri d'Arbois de Jubainville. In 1899, he wrote a short story, Povestea Moșului ("The Tale of the Old Man"). Well-liked by his literary friends Gheorghe T. Kirileanu and Paul Bujor, it was published in Carmen Sylva magazine under the pen name of "Z.".

In 1902, Zarifopol's professor, Alexandru Philippide, took him on as an assistant and considered him for a likely successor; Zarifopol excused himself, and recommended the Jewish intellectual Heimann Hariton Tiktin for that position. As he noted, Tiktin was more qualified, despite being targeted by a "rather violent antisemitic current". Instead, Zarifopol left for Germany to specialize in philology (under Hermann Suchier), and philosophy, as a student of Alois Riehl's objectivist worldview. He took a doctorate at the University of Halle in 1904, with a dissertation on trouvère Richard de Fournival. His main passion was for the music of Richard Wagner, through which he then discovered sagas, which he came to regard as perfect storytelling.

=== Caragiale companion ===
On April 25, 1903, at Berlin, Zarifopol married Ștefania (Fany) Dobrogeanu-Gherea, the daughter of Constantin Dobrogeanu-Gherea. Zarifopol was an atheist; Fany was Jewish, and, like Zarifopol, a religious nonconformist. The couple turned up at the marriage registrar in street clothes and neither held a church wedding nor baptized their children; all this outraged his mother, a strict member of the Romanian Orthodox Church. Dobrogeanu-Gherea, a literary critic, and his son Alexandru were also Marxist doctrinaires; Alexandru's daughter, also called Fany, was married to Ion Luca Caragiale's son Luca (Luki). While visiting his in-laws, Zarifopol met various figures of international socialism, including revolutionary Karl Radek.

The Zarifopols had two children: daughter Sonia (born 1904), and son Paul (born 1905). Selling their Cârligi home in 1906, the new family settled in Leipzig, where Paul developed a friendship with Caragiale the elder, who frequently visited from Berlin; with Dimitrie Gusti and Panait Cerna, he is described by Caragiale biographers as the comedic writer's closest Romanian friends in old age, or even, with an affinity in "sneering spirits", as his one true friend. The relationship proved decisive in Zarifopol's evolution as a critic, but also left a trace on Caragiale's style: Zarifopol introduced him to the work of Anatole France. Until Caragiale's death in 1912, he and Zarifopol pursued a steady correspondence. Sometimes involving kitsch postcards they each collected for their involuntary humor, such exchanges were noted for witticisms and ridicule of traditional writers. They also shed light on Caragiale's intellectual, psychological, and artistic evolution, making Zarifopol a prime reference in that field.

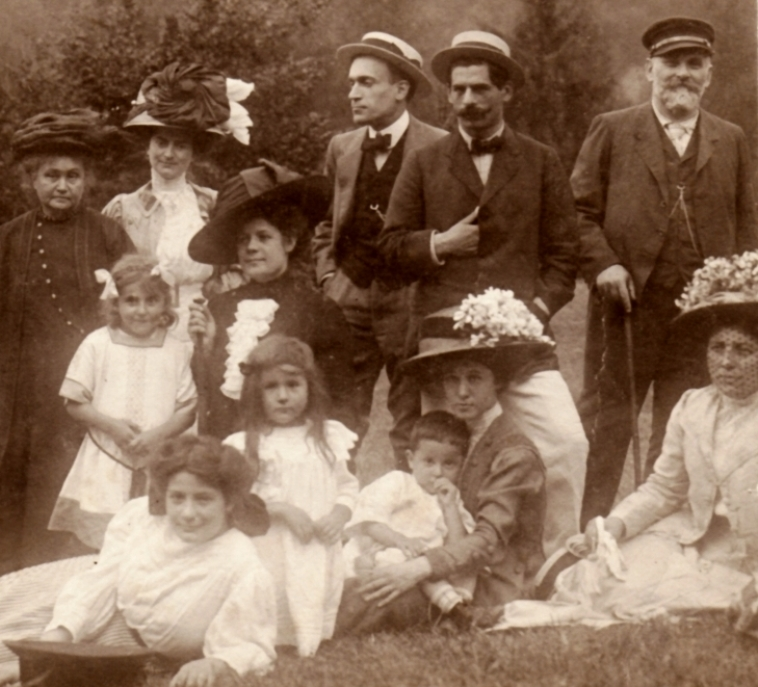
Constantin Dobrogeanu-Gherea, Dionisie Ghermani Sr, and Zarifopol (top row, from the right), vacationing in Sinaia in 1908. Fany and Sonia Zarifopol are kneeling to Zarifopol's left; Paul the younger is front row, held in her arms by pianist Maria Cernovodeanu

From 1908 to 1911, Zarifopol contributed to the Munich-based Süddeutsche Monatshefte. Also a correspondent for the Romanian literary press, his writing broke with the older canons of Romanian literary criticism and brought him to the attention of Dobrogeanu-Gherea disciple Garabet Ibrăileanu. Co-opted by the latter to write for Viața Românească, Zarifopol made himself known for sarcastic comments about modernist literature, describing Proust, Gide, and Cocteau as difficult "boys and children". Instead, he persuaded Ibrăileanu to publish there a novel written in collaborations by two of his brothers-in-law, Luki and Ionel Gherea. Together with the latter, he also supervised the debut of a female novelist, Lucia Demetrius.

In 1915, Zarifopol and his family returned to Romania. By then, World War I had broken out, with Romania settled in uneasy neutrality until 1916. For much of that interval, Zarifopol was a literary contributor for Tudor Arghezi's Cronica, but did not necessarily share the magazine's radical stances, nor its anti-war "Germanophilia". During the campaigns of 1916–1917, Zarifopol and his family remained in Iași; all of southern Romania fell to the Germans. For a while, accepting Ibrăileanu's offer, he returned to his alma mater as a substitute professor, replacing C. Fedeleș (presumed missing in action). Upon Fedeleș's unexpected return, Zarifopol was sacked. In late 1916, the family took refuge in Russia, settling for a while in Moscow, but were driven out by the October Revolution.

=== Interwar losses and recovery ===
Described by historian Lucian Nastasă as a withdrawn, "neurasthenic" and "very impractical" person, Zarifopol was financially ruined in the monetary devaluation that took place after the war. He supported himself by turning to regular journalism, but still had trouble making ends meet (though he did not admit to it), and made efforts to keep away from the centers of culture, living mostly in provincial Sinaia. He confessed to fellow journalist Mihail Sevastos that he was unable to write at a steady pace: "Even when writing a short article, I need to interrupt myself for some hours, even some days."

Zarifopol, sometimes using the pen names PZ and Anton Gherman, returned as one of the main columnists at Viața Românească and its satellite, Adevărul Literar și Artistic. Despite his material difficulties, Zarifopol categorically refused Ibrăileanu and Petre Andrei's offers to take a professorate at Iași. In early 1920, he complained that the "endless infirmities of my children, my wife, and myself" prevented him from publishing his cultural journalism as an academic volume, which would have qualified him for the office. In 1924, Zarifopol informed his protectors that he now had "a holy terror of officialdom", and that he resented Iași for its support for the National-Christian Defense League, a form of "nationalist imbecility and charlatanry". As he noted: "all things considered, I can make a living from journalism alone."

A guest writer at Camil Petrescu's Săptămâna Intelectuală și Artistică in 1924, and, in 1925, at Cuvântul Liber, Zarifopol became more deeply involved in the cultural debates of Greater Romania. In 1926, he and Sevastos served as secretaries of the League against Terror, formed in opposition to Alexandru Averescu and his People's League. This was also the time of Zarifopol's explicit emancipation from Dobrogeanu-Gherea's left-wing didacticism and from Ibrăileanu's Poporanism. Didactic and social art, Zarifopol contended, had no real artistic value, and politics were irrelevant in assessing the quality of artistic endeavor. Revising some of his earlier pronouncements on modernism, he now believed in art for art's sake, illustrated by such qualities as "pleasure", "amusement", "life", "drama", "color", "strange sensibilities", or "childish delirium". His refusal of didactic art aimed higher, showing up in his celebrated essay on Tolstoy's Kreutzer Sonata. Working from Sinaia, Zarifopol translated and prefaced an anthology of fantasy short stories, published in 1924 as Vedenii ("Visions"). Part of his essays were published as Din registrul ideilor gingașe ("A Register of Tender Ideas", 1926), Despre stil ("On Style", 1928), Artiști și idei literare române ("Artists and Ideas in Romanian Literature", 1930), and Încercări de precizie literară ("Essays in Literary Precision", 1931).

Zarifopol's dissidence was admonished by other Viața Românească veterans Ibrăileanu and Mihai Ralea. Ibrăileanu took in some of Zarifopol's criticism, but argued that some of Poporanism's theories were rehabilitated in psychologism or social determinism, without which "an artwork can never hope to be fully understood". The magazine's literary columnists even accused Zarifopol of committing a "crime" against taste at Adevărul Literar și Artistic, where Zarifopol was introducing aestheticist guidelines, albeit with contributions that remained "interesting and profound". Nonetheless, Zarifopol's derision of traditionalism and mysticism showed lasting similarities with Ralea's philosophical stances. In 1928, Ralea, Zarifopol, D. I. Suchianu, Felix Aderca and other literati were lumped together as the "irresponsible malcontents", in a neotraditionalist pamphlet put out by Petre Pandrea and Gândirea magazine.

In his replies, Zarifopol noted that he did not reject mysticism as a cultural phenomenon, only objecting to the "career mysticism" of traditionalist ideologues. Contested by young and old critics alike, Zarifopol found himself a follower with Mihail Sebastian, who honored him as "a lucid man in a time of visionaries", "a sober teetotaler during a raging drinking bout". Zarifopol's cultural role, Sebastian wrote, was that of a "policeman", a "reactionary", who would curb the excesses of mysticism, Trăirism, and nationalism.

=== Final creative period and death ===
Zarifopol eventually moved to Bucharest in 1928, taking up residence on Strada Spătarului, Moșilor. Slowly discarding social and literary criticism in favor of philology, he worked on a critical edition of Caragiale's works; he put out the first three volumes (1930, 1931, 1932), winning a prize from the Romanian Writers' Society. In March 1929, together with Gala Galaction, Nicolae L. Lupu and others, he put out the monthly magazine Hanul Samariteanului, which only published a single issue. Later that year, he became a writer for Isac Ludo's mainly Jewish review, Adam, and, in Viața Românească, published his review of Immanuel Kant's aesthetics (Kant și estetica). His other contributions appeared in various new magazines and newspapers, including Adevărul (which in 1927 hosted his humorous memoir of a meeting with Radek), Dreptatea, Kalende, Lamura, Gazeta Fălticenilor, and Ancheta.

He carried on with his lampoons of traditionalism, publishing, in 1932, an especially mordant portrait of historian Vasile Pârvan, Plicticoase fantome ("Tedious Apparitions"). He was also involved with Criterion, a debate club for political and cultural factions, one of the "old men" who were called upon as both arbiters and active participants. He and Ralea were thus present when the debates about Gide, Lenin, Sigmund Freud, and Charlie Chaplin either degenerated into squabbles or were broken up by the far-right Defense League.

In 1933, Zarifopol was named editor-in-chief of Revista Fundațiilor Regale, the official literary magazine, which was largely conceived by him. In February 1934, he was involved with Convorbiri Literare in round-table talks that were supposed to revive Criterion. These projects ended abruptly when Zarifopol died of a heart attack on May 1, at 12 AM, allegedly while visiting his mistress, musicologist Lisette Georgescu. His body was cremated on May 3, with Camil Petrescu succeeding him at Revista Fundațiilor Regale.

His most important work as a literary critic appeared posthumously in 1934; called Pentru arta literară ("For Literary Art"), it was praised by Sebastian as "a model of precise understanding of values and of their order". In 1935, Șerban Cioculescu put out a critical edition of the Caragiale–Zarifopol correspondence, while editing new volumes from the Caragiale corpus, which Zarifopol had begun publishing.

== Work ==
=== Generic traits ===
Once settled in his role as an advocate of art for art's sake, Zarifopol created himself a confrontational niche, earning both respect and bewilderment from his readers. A traditionalist adversary, Nicolae Iorga, recognized Zarifopol as a "refined and daring thinker", while his Viața Românească partner Ralea called him "charming and irritating". Ralea identified in him "a freethinker" with "the courage of looking truth in the face", but essentially a "freezing intelligence" of "destructive anarchism", a man "alone within his sarcasm". A more virulent review came from classicist George Călinescu, who proposed that Zarifopol's one original note was "continuous and systematic persiflage, to the point of annoyance". He attributed such traits to Zarifopol's familiarity with "two sophistic races", Greeks and Jews, his claim in turn criticized by Ralea and philosopher Mircea Florian for its racialist undertones. Florian also discussed the constructive side of Zarifopol's work, arguing that accusations of "bourgeois anarchism" and "iconoclasm" were prejudiced. Another sympathetic reviewer, Andreea Grinea Mironescu, sees Călinescu's pronouncements as "minimizing and petty."

Eugen Lovinescu, the modernist literary theorist, shared Zarifopol's overall aesthetic goals, but not his methods: Zarifopol, he writes, was an unlikely follower of Titu Maiorescu's non-didactic school of "aesthetic autonomy" and authenticity, which had emerged at Junimea in the 1860s, and had also influenced Caragiale. In 1941, Nicolae Bagdasar identified in Zarifopol "a vastly cultured critic, of a rare subtlety and fine irony", lamenting that his work "remains scattered in so many magazines". However, as argued by colleague Pompiliu Constantinescu, this improvidence was a fundamental trait and shortcoming of Zarifopol's literary contribution: his was a "newspaperman's critique" of "spontaneous impression, quick analysis, and incomplete assessment, meaning that he could never embrace a creator in all their complexity." The same was noted by Călinescu, who argues that Zarifopol's "journalistic method" relied on explicit appeals to popularity and spurious accuracy.

Lovinescu assessed that Zarifopol's criticism "lingers in the paradox", always placing itself "at the antipodes of common sense": denying merit to prestigious figures such as Renan or Maupassant, but praising Ion Minulescu as an outstanding novelist. His "practical" verdicts, Lovinescu notes, remain "disoriented", "regrettable". Similarly, Sevastos notes that Zarifopol was "wavery" when it came to the hierarchies of Romanian literature, being mistaken about not just Minulescu, but also Ion Vinea and Pamfil Șeicaru, whom he regarded as great humorists. He also reports that Ibrăileanu was similarly puzzled, describing Zarifopol as a "perfectly trained hound, with no sense of smell." Lovinescu acknowledges Zarifopol's "stylistic rigor", but concludes that his is "an equation in which the unknown is better left unknown", something "virtually alien to the rhythms of our literary movement." The same was argued decades later by Lovinescu disciple Nicolae Manolescu.

According to Ralea, Zarifopol should be read as a Romanian counterpart of anti-populist "lone travelers", from Barbey d'Aurevilly and Edgar Allan Poe to Hanns Heinz Ewers, often applauding causes that were "at odds with the establishment". Thus, responding to the established literary canons, Zarifopol fashioned himself an alternative one, comprising Caragiale, Minulescu, Proust and Cocteau, but also Joseph Delteil, Henri de Régnier, Adrian Maniu, Păstorel Teodoreanu, and Dragoș Protopopescu. Călinescu believes that Zarifopol was most "intelligent" in his essays on Proust and Gustave Flaubert, where he overcame his usual "journalistic banality".

=== Aesthetic ideals ===
Zarifopol's rejection of neoclassicism, from Goethe to Dimitrie Bolintineanu, but also his friend Panait Cerna, had to do with both its "mechanic" use of poetic imagery and its communication of "bland truths". He preferred archaic Moldavian forms, that he found resonating in the poetry of Dosoftei and Vasile Alecsandri. Călinescu was especially critical of Zarifopol literal and "negativist" reading of Alexandru Vlahuță's Din prag, which ridiculed the poet's presentment of death eternal.

Such a sustained attack, equated by comparatist Nicolae Balotă with "a holocaust of poetry", nevertheless impressed Lovinescu. The latter declared himself in agreement with the thesis that ancient models were perishable, and that traditionalist art was implicitly false. Seen by Alexandru Paleologu as a more radical anti-classicist than Zarifopol ever was, Lovinescu noted in 1943: "as modernism or synchronism, I have been supporting those same ideas these past twenty years." Zarifopol's revolt was more contextual, and bound by his own debt to the classics: Ralea sees him as a classical rationalist in the manner of Voltaire, Sainte-Beuve, and Anatole France, and Călinescu as a "cultured academic, for all his freethinking airs", copying his style from Caragiale and Tudor Arghezi, without "a sense of the sublime". Balotă also finds Zarifopol a "suppressed scholar", "in denial of his formative background".

Călinescu sees Zarifopol a man of little classical culture, his "obviously German method" being more akin to the sociology of literature. Such verdicts were nuanced by another literary historian, Alexandru Dima, who suggests that Zarifopol did have contribution to the scholarly study of aesthetics, one which "imposes itself even against his own wish." Zarifopol's rejection of scientism and historicism had deep roots in Junimism and neo-Kantianism, but Zarifopol also criticized Kantian assumptions about the sublime, finding them too indebted to ethical imperatives. As noted by Dima, his attachment to phenomenology was "at the very least formal". According to Balotă, his applications of the art for art's sake principle show that, despite his own claims to the contrary, Zarifopol borrowed his poetics from Henri Brémond, Paul Valéry, and Stéphane Mallarmé.

=== Social critic ===
Revisiting Zarifopol's moralizing essays in 2007, critic Henri Zalis found him to be "chaste and meticulous, and in this unmatched." Din registrul ideilor gingașe, is, according to Lovinescu, an "interesting intellectual spectacle of deliberate originality". This is one of several essays containing Zarifopol's Junimea-like satire of inauthentic mofturi ("trifles" or "coquetries", a term echoing Caragiale), including wholesale borrowings of foreign customs that respond to bourgeois tastes. The eponymous "tender ideas" were defined by Zarifopol as "those which should be familiar to any man wishing to pass for cultured, and also those that said man must be careful to speak about just so, lest he insult the views of society"; the book was addressed to those skeptics who, rejecting cultural crazes, "still value consistency". As Ralea notes, Zarifopol's anti-ideological critique, continuing the work of Caragiale, was specifically deriding philosophers and philosophies that were the height of fashion: mystical, Bergsonian, Japonist; other such hobbyhorses were Nietzscheism and psychoanalysis.

Călinescu was unimpressed by Zarifopol's "rather belated" satire of bourgeois mores, since "the bourgeois is no longer that ridiculous conservative figure". Yet, Zarifopol was not entirely anti-middle class: he believed his type of "cold lucidity" was primarily an in-built antidote to the decay of the "colossal civilization" that was liberal society. He issued what Florian calls a "passionate call to order of the bourgeoisie, [which is] still a bearer of cultural values." Himself a conservative, Zarifopol expressed his nostalgia for old-regime social differentiation and division of labor, against "the political type", and for the nuclear family of patriarchy, against the "neutralization" of fathers in modern society. He criticizes both Francophilia and Germanophilia, noting that, although competing, they each supported deindividuation: the former, through corporatism; the latter, through militarism. While targeting philistinism, Din registrul... is itself an antiintellectualist manifesto. Zarifopol contended that intellectuals were an illusory social class (no economic interest bound together "a lawyer with a novelist"), but still collectively responsible for the failures of a society such as Romania's.

Zarifopol took distance from more radical antiintelectualist stances, communist as well as Christian; but also noted that natural disunity between intellectuals meant that communist terrorism was itself an intellectuals' affair. Both Din registrul... and other writings show him as an anti-Soviet in line with Nikolai Berdyaev, and believed that Leninism was a somewhat worrisome, but generally puerile, non-philosophy. Like fascism and, historically, Bonapartism, it stood for a "simplistic autocratic drive" and "stupefied blindness". Moreover, Zarifopol rejected Marxist literary criticism, with its discourse of base and superstructure, seeing it as the source of modernist kitsch.

In 2014, posthumously reviewing Zarifiopol's anticommunist notes, scholar Vladimir Tismăneanu described him as a diagnostician of "totalitarian reflexes", displaying "urbanity, civility, moderation and firmness". Evidence also exists that, beyond this public persona, Zarifopol was more illiberal. Prolonging his antihumanist tendencies, he expressed in private his reserves for the "deplorable" literature of "the oppressed", including Jews, social climbers, and especially women; according to Nastasă, he was an antifeminist, and perhaps also a misogynist. In 1932, writer Barbu Brezianu suggested that Zarifopol was on the "far-right" of Romanian literature, in the "grand conservative party" of D. Nanu, Cincinat Pavelescu, Mihail Sadoveanu, and Al. T. Stamatiad. Contrarily, in 1959 philosopher Lucian Blaga claimed that Zarifopol was "a man whom everybody knew to have left-wing inclinations."

== Legacy ==
Fany Zarifopol, born in 1876, lived until 1945. Paul Jr spent seventeen years as a political prisoner under the communist regime, being released with a general amnesty in 1964. Officially designating him a "bourgeois idealist", communist censorship prevented Zarifopol's essays from being either reprinted or quoted before the mid 1960s liberalization. When they were finally returned to circulation, large parts of his work were still being bracketed out.

Sonia Zarifopol, who never married, was a lover of literature and, in the 1930s, a discreet presence at Lovinescu's Sburătorul society. She kept her father's entire collection of manuscripts and documents, now housed at the Museum of Romanian Literature. She died in 1981, and her brother three years later; neither had children of their own. George Zarifopol's son, Constantin Radu "Dinu", was a published novelist. His daughter Ilinca, marginalized at home for her aristocratic descent, emigrated to the United States in 1977. A linguist and comparatist, she taught at Indiana University Bloomington, marrying Anglicist Kenneth R. Johnston. She was joined there by her sister Christina Zarifopol-Illias, who organized the Bloomington Romanian Studies Program.

The critical reappraisal of Zarifopol, begun by Eugen Simion in 1956, was taken up in the 1980s by Paleologu and Marin Mincu. Reviewer Adrian Oprina describes Paleologu himself as a Zarifopol disciple, noting that the Zarifopol was "a spiritual parent for young people in the 1930s [though] one whose parentage was originally denied by them". In underground culture, his memory was cultivated by the essayist Nicolae Steinhardt. Although a fervent Orthodox, he viewed the non-believers Zarifopol and Ralea as intellectual standards, praising their "quick wit". From 1971, Al. Săndulescu was allowed to publish selections of Zarifopol's literary prose, and, in 1987, Zarifopol's correspondence (at Editura Minerva, with samples in Manuscriptum magazine). A more thorough recovery came after the Romanian Revolution of 1989, when more complete anthologies first emerged, and Zarifopol monographs were published by Alex. Cistelecan. In 1992, his formerly censored critique of socialism was issued by Editura Albatros as a standalone book, Marxism amuzant ("Amusing Marxism"). His Bucharest home was not fitted with a memorial plaque—the new owners having reportedly refused to allow it.
