= Tudor Șoimaru =

Romanian literary critic (1898–1967)

Gheorghe Drăgușanu (December 29, 1898 – September 18, 1967), known under the pseudonym Tudor Șoimaru, was a Romanian literary critic, the founder, together with Vladimir Streinu, Șerban Cioculescu and Pompiliu Constantinescu, of Kalende magazine in 1928.
