= Petru Comarnescu =

Romanian literary and art critic and translator

Petru Comarnescu (23 November 1905 – 27 November 1970) was a Romanian literary and art critic and translator.

== Early life and education ==
Born in Iași into a family that was related to the metropolitan bishop Veniamin Costache, he studied law at the University of Bucharest (degree in 1928), philosophy and philology (degree in 1929) before going in 1931 on a two-year scholarship to the United States of America, where he received a PhD in aesthetics from the University of Southern California, Los Angeles, with his thesis The Nature of Beauty and Its Relation to Goodness (published later in Romanian in 1946 as Kalokagathon).

== Career ==
Together with Mircea Vulcănescu and Alexandru Christian Tell, he started the Criterion association and magazine in 1934. Before the Second World War, he published in several Romanian newspapers, for example Adevărul, Adevărul literar și artistic, Azi, Stânga, Arta, Excelsior, Da și nu, Ulisse and was an editor at Vremea (1931–1936), Rampa (1933–1934), Revista Fundațiilor Regale (from its foundation to 1943). Between 1944 and 1949 he published in Bis, Agora, Timpul, Arcades, Națiunea, and Universul.

Between 1949 and 1960, he was not allowed to publish under his own name, due to political reasons. The only exceptions were monographies about painters or sculptors: Octav Băncilă (1954), Abgar Baltazar (1956), Viața și opera lui Rembrandt van Rijn ("The Life And Work of Rembrandt") (1957), Nicolae Grigorescu (1959), Ștefan Luchian (1960). Later, he would also write about other well-known Romanian visual artists, such as Gheorghe Petrașcu, Theodor Pallady, Nicolae Tonitza, Francisc Șirato, Ion Țuculescu, sometimes even in English The Romanian and the Universal in Brâncuși's Work (1970).

Trying to avoid being marginalized, he compromised with the communist authorities, such as by joining the Romanian Workers' Party (Partidul Muncitoresc Român), later called the Romanian Communist Party (Partidul Comunist Român). In 2014 Comarnescu was found to have been an informant for the Securitate.

Alone or in cooperation with others, he translated from English or Russian works of D. H. Lawrence, Daniel Defoe, Sir Walter Scott, Mark Twain, Eugene O’Neill, J. B. Priestley, Howard Fast, Leo Tolstoi, Alexander Herzen, Alexander Gorchakov, Gleb Uspensky, Nikolay Chernyshevsky, Sasha Chorny, and Ilya Ehrenburg. He was critically acclaimed by his contemporaries, Camil Petrescu calling him the "leader" of their generation, Barbu Brezianu its "herald", and Mircea Eliade its "magus".

== Family ==
Comarnescu was married to Gina Manolescu-Strunga, the daughter of a liberal politician, but she had been in love with N. D. Cocea, a well-known writer and journalist, from the age of 17 (and by whom she became pregnant after her marriage). They divorced two years later. Comarnescu was also a homosexual.

== Death ==
He died at age 65 in Bucharest, and was buried at the Voroneț Monastery cemetery.

== Memberships ==
- Member of the Romanian Writers' Association (Societatea Scriitorilor Români) (1945), and later of The Romanian Writers' Union (Uniunea Scriitorilor din R.S.R).
- Member of the Fine Arts Association of Romania (U.A.P.), Critics section. After facing opposition by some of the members he was finally accepted, being supported by Alexandru Rosetti, Tudor Vianu, Ion Frunzetti and Vlaicu Bârna.

== Awards and prizes ==
- Meritul Cultural clasa I (1946)
- Meritul Cultural în rang de Cavaler, clasa a II-a (1947)
- Ordinul Cultural în rang de Cavaler, clasa a II-a (1968)
- The Fine Arts Association of Romania's Criticism Prize (1965)
- Gold Medal of the International Association of Art Critics (AICA), on the occasion of the 16th congress held in Rimini, Italy.

== Selected works ==
- Homo Americanus (1933)
- Zgârie-norii New York-ului (1933)
- America văzută de un tânăr de azi (1934)
- Răspântii- forme de viață culturală (1936)
- Artă și imagine (1939)
- Soluțiile artei în cultura modernă (1943)
- Giordano Bruno (1947)
- Chipurile și priveliștile Americii (1940)
- America. Lume nouă, viață nouă (1947)
- Chipurile și priveliștile Europei (posthumously) (1980)
- Pagini de Jurnal, Editura Noul Orfeu, Bucharest, 2003

== Books about him ==
- Monica Ștefan (Grosu), Petru Comarnescu – un neliniștit în secolul său (PhD thesis, published as a monography).
