= Dej Prison =

Prison in Dej, Romania

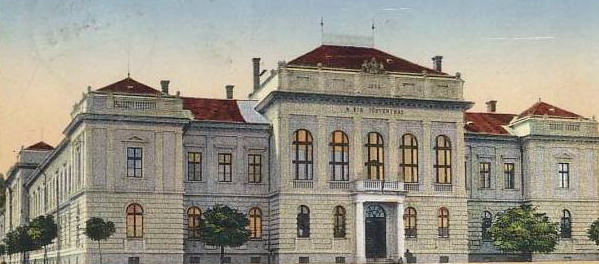
The Someș County courthouse during the interwar period, now the Dej palace of justice

Dej Prison is a prison located in Dej, Romania.

Located in the northern part of the town, the prison was part of the Dej Courthouse, completed in 1894. It had 66 cells for common criminals. During the early communist regime, the prison housed common criminals. There were seventeen escapes in 1948–1950. The maximum number of inmates was 500 in 1954; political prisoners began to appear around that time, until 1963. Both men and women, some were merely in transit, while others served time for high treason or espionage on behalf of Western powers. In the 1950s, against a backdrop of bureaucratic chaos, the prisoners suffered from lack of beds, blankets, medical attention, hygiene, and food, although the situation was slightly improved in the early 1960s.

Most of the political prisoners had been sentenced during show trials. Around 1960, three figures associated with the Lucrețiu Pătrășcanu case were incarcerated at Dej and subjected to harsh treatment: Belu Zilber, Herant Torosian, and Harry Brauner. Others included Radu Cioculescu (who died there in 1961), Vasile Leu, Nicolae Mărgineanu, Ștefan I. Nenițescu, George Tomaziu, Alexandru Popovici, and Alexandru Todea. Additionally, members of the Italian legation tried and sentenced in 1951 were sent to Dej, as was Ioan Mocsony-Stârcea, former marshal of the royal palace.
