= Mircea Vulcănescu =

Romanian philosopher, convicted war criminal

- Born: March 3, 1904; Bucharest, Kingdom of Romania
- Died: October 28, 1952 (aged 48); Aiud Prison, Romanian People's Republic
- Education: University of Bucharest
- Occupations: Philosopher, economist, politician
- Spouses: Anina Rădulescu-Pogoneanu (m. 1925, divorced) Margareta Ioana Niculescu (m. 1930)
- Awards: Order of the Star of Romania, Grand Officer rank

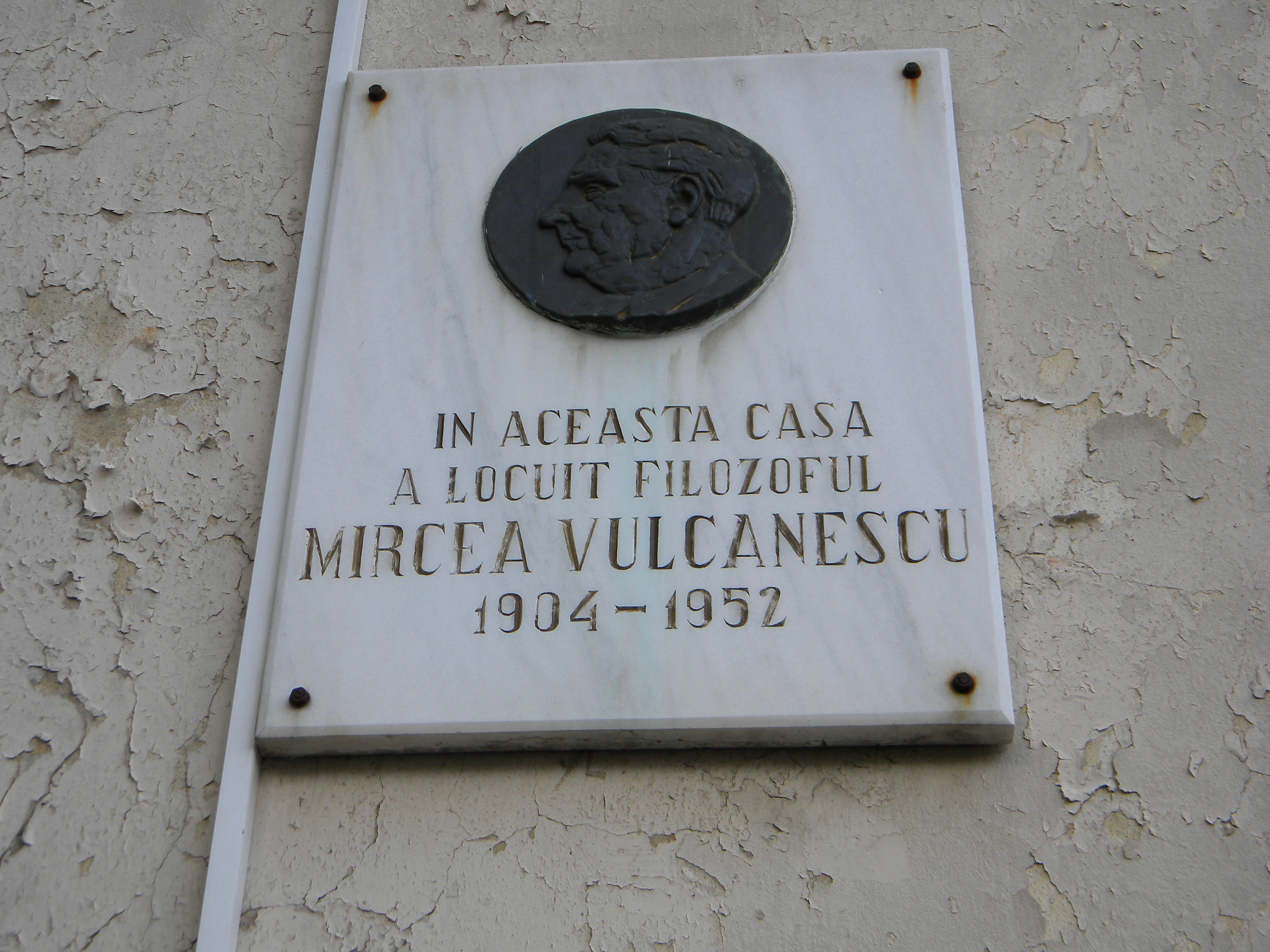
Mircea Vulcănescu commemorative plaque in Bucharest

Mircea Aurel Vulcănescu (3 March 1904 – 28 October 1952) was a Romanian philosopher, economist, ethics teacher, sociologist, and politician. Undersecretary at the Ministry of Finance from 1941 to 1944 in the Nazi-aligned government of Ion Antonescu, he was arrested in 1946 and convicted as a war criminal.

== Biography ==
He was born in Bucharest on March 3, 1904, the second child of Mihail Vulcănescu, a financial controller with the Ministry of Finance, and Maria, the descendant of a family of landowners from the Olt area. After the German Army occupied Bucharest in World War I, the family took refuge in 1917 in Zvoriștea, a village in northern Moldavia. Mircea Vulcănescu attended gymnasium in Iași and Tecuci, and went to high school in Galați before returning to Bucharest at the end of the war. He completed his secondary education at Gheorghe Lazăr High School and Mihai Viteazul High School, defending his baccalaureate in 1921. He studied philosophy and law at the University of Bucharest, graduating in 1925 with licentiate thesis Individ și societate în sociologia contemporană, written under the direction of Dimitrie Gusti. He was then more attracted to sociology, due to his field experiences (monograph campaigns) under the coordination of Gusti, who became one of his most admired mentors, alongside Nae Ionescu. Vulcănescu was also Gusti's assistant at the Faculty of Sociology in Bucharest. He then went to Paris, where he pursued doctoral research at the Faculty of Law of the University of Paris; in November 1928, he earned a degree in economics and political science, but later dropped out, without completing his Ph.D. degree. While in France, he wrote several "Letters from Paris", two of which were published in Romania in Gândirea magazine.

Between 1924 and 1932, he took part in several monographic research campaigns, in Goicea Mare, Fundu Moldovei, Runcu, Cornova, and Drăguș. From 1932 to 1933, alongside Constantin Noica, Petru Comarnescu, Emil Cioran, Mircea Eliade, and Dan Botta, he gained a high profile through publishing and the intense activity of the Criterion association. In January 1934 he was invited by Alexandru Tzigara-Samurcaș, the director of Convorbiri Literare, to join the editorial board of this prestigious literary magazine, which also included Eliade, Noica, and Henri H. Stahl. Together with Eugène Ionesco, Cioran, Eliade, and Noica, Vulcănescu was one of the most prominent members of the so-called "golden generation" of the 1930s Romania.

From June 1935 to September 1937, Vulcănescu was director of the Customs Service, while in 1940 he was director of the Public Debt Department. From January 27, 1941 to August 23, 1944, he was undersecretary at the Ministry of Finance, in the Ion Antonescu government. In November 1941, he was awarded the Order of the Star of Romania, Grand Officer rank. During the war, he was one of Romania's best negotiators with Nazi Germany, managing to obtain for the National Bank of Romania eight wagons of gold (confiscated by the Soviet Union after 1944), and the endowment of the Romanian 4th Army with new military equipment. According to Deutsche Welle, he was "rhinocerized by the Legionary Movement and pro-Nazism". According to Radio France Internationale, "he participated in dozens of councils of ministers in which aspects related to preparation and decision-making as practical as possible for the extermination of the Jewish and Roma population were discussed."

After the coup d'état of August 1944 he returned to his job as director of the Public Debt Department. He was arrested on August 30, 1946, tried as a war criminal. The prosecutor of his case, Alexandru Ionescu-Lungu, issued a finding on September 4, stating that there was no case of criminal prosecution against Vulcănescu, for any criminal act that he would have committed as undersecretary of state at the Ministry of Finance in the Antonescu government. The Appeals Court ignored the finding, and ordered his prosecution through an indictment not signed by the general prosecutor, but approved by the Council of Ministers in the meeting of September 24 chaired by Prime Minister Petru Groza. On October 9, 1946, Vulcănescu was sentenced to 8 years in prison. However, the trial was in itself a controversial one, since the judiciary regime suffered from the influence of the Communist Party and, consequently, from the Soviet occupation. Vulcănescu was convicted for "permitting the entry of the German army on the country's territory" and for "declaring or continuing the war against the Union of Soviet Socialist Republics and the United Nations". He was not convicted (and, in the Court of Appeal trial not even accused) for the acts punished by law 312/1945 that fell within the scope of unjust anti-Jewish (or racial) laws or actions.

Nicolae Mărgineanu, an academic at the King Ferdinand I University of Cluj and a post-mortem member of the Romanian Academy, claimed that the accusations that were brought against Vulcănescu were false and that he was a victim of the Communist regime, as part of a larger scheme of the authorities whose aim was to slowly kill off Romanian intellectuals, especially those who opposed the regime. The political character of his conviction was confirmed by the Bucharest Tribunal in 2017.

From his arrest to his conviction, Vulcănescu was held at the prisons in Văcărești and Jilava, where he was subjected to torture. After his conviction, he was sent to the notorious Aiud Prison, where he was held in isolation at the "Zarca". In December 1951, together with Mărgineanu (who was also detained at Aiud), he planned a mass escape of the prisoners, so that, once they were free, they would contact the anti-communist resistance in the mountains. However, not all the detainees agreed, and in the end only three of them (aviators Tudor Greceanu and Gheorghe Spulbatu, and journalist Valeriu Șirianu) managed to escape. Suffering from tuberculosis and denied medical care, he died on October 28, 1952. His last words are said to have been: "Do not avenge us, but do not forget us!".

== Family ==
He was married twice. His first wife was Anina Rădulescu-Pogoneanu, whom he married in the fall of 1925; the two had a daughter, Elena-Maria-Viorica (Vivi), in the summer of 1927. After a divorce, he married his second wife, Mărgărita-Ioana Niculescu, in the spring of 1930; they had two daughters: Elisabeta-Alexandra (Sandra), born in 1931, and Ioana-Maria-Mărgărita (Mariuca), born in 1933. Mariuca was imprisoned from 1952 to 1954 by the Communist authorities because she was Vulcănescu's daughter.

== Controversies ==
He has been pursuing (somewhat more moderate) anti-Semitic politics since his student years, under the macabre influence of Nae Ionescu.

According to Zigu Ornea, Vulcănescu considered himself a sympathizer of the Iron Guard. Other scholars considered him to be "a supporter of discrimination based on ethnicity", who, according to the director of the Elie Wiesel National Institute for Studying the Holocaust in Romania, "supported spiritually and morally the antisemitism of the government." Even sources who argue that formally he was not a war criminal, compare him with Adolf Eichmann, i.e., more fit than Eichmann for the banality of evil.

Despite these claims, in one of his works, Vulcănescu reportedly considered the Iron Guard as a terrorist movement controlled by Nazi Germany. For these reasons, he refused to join the government led by the Legionary Movement in 1940. According to journalist Andrew Higgins writing for The New York Times, he "is remembered now not as an agent of the Holocaust but as a leading intellectual from the 1930s, a period when many prominent Romanian thinkers embraced extreme nationalism suffused with religious faith."

The Mircea Vulcănescu Technological High School bore his name until April 5, 2023, when it got changed to The Economic High School, no. 1; founded in 1992, the school is located in Sector 4 of Bucharest. An attempt was made in 2017 by the Council of Sector 4 to rename the school after Traian Popovici, but the proposal was eventually rejected. In 2009, a bust of Vulcănescu designed by sculptor Valentina Boștină was unveiled in Sector 2's Saint Stephen Plaza. In December 2022, a proposal to demolish the bust was put before the Council of Sector 2; the proposal was opposed by academicians Răzvan Theodorescu and Bogdan Simionescu and was ultimately turned down by the council.

Streets in Aiud and in Bucharest's Sector 1 are also named after him. In 2017, the Elie Wiesel Institute requested that the name of the Mircea Vulcănescu Street in Sector 1 be changed; after a public appeal by several dozen Romanian intellectuals and consultation with the Romanian Academy, the request was denied by the Bucharest prefecture. The request (addressed to then-Mayor of Bucharest Nicușor Dan) was renewed in March 2025; the Bucharest Court of Appeals denied the request in July 2026.

== Main works ==
- Teoria și sociologia vieții economice. Prolegomene la studiul morfologiei economice a unui sat (The Theory and Sociology of Economic Life. Prolegomena to the Study of Morphological Economy of a Village) (1932)
- În ceasul al 11-lea (The Eleventh Hour) (1932)
- Cele două Românii (The Two Romanias) (1932)
- Gospodăria țărănească și cooperația (1933)
- (with Traian Herseni), D. Gusti și școala sociologică de la București (Dimitrie Gusti the professor), București, Institutul Social Român, 1937 OCLC 82696154
- Războiul pentru întregirea neamului (The War for Reuniting Kin) (1938)
- Înfățișarea socială a două județe (The Social Appearance of Two Counties) (1938)
- Dimensiunea românească a existenței (The Romanian Dimension of Existence) (1943)

=== Posthumous works ===
- "Câteva observațiuni asupra vieții spirituale a sătenilor din Goicea-Mare – note dintr-o anchetă sociologică", Sociologie Românească, 1 (3–4): 365–369, August 30, 1990
- Marin Diaconu, ed. (1991). Dimensiunea românească a existenței. București: Editura Fundației Culturale Române. ISBN 973-9132-04-9. OCLC 26852054.
- "Raportul secției economice (Runcu, 1930) – text inedit", Sociologie Românească, 3 (4): 381–389, 1992
- Marin Diaconu, ed. (1996). Către ființa spiritualității românești. București: Editura Eminescu. OCLC 246991661.
- Marin Diaconu, ed. (2004). Bunul Dumnezeu cotidian: studii despre religie. București: Editura Humanitas. ISBN 973-50-0626-X. OCLC 60754316.
- Eugen Simion; Marin Diaconu, eds. (2005). Chipuri spirituale. Prolegomene sociologice. București: Editura Fundației Naționale pentru Știință și Artă. ISBN 973-637-092-5. OCLC 71144159.
- Creștinul în lumea modernă: răul veacului și criza bisericii. București: Cuvântul Ortodox. 2013. ISBN 978-606-93613-1-3. OCLC 997391106.
- "Statul țărănesc (1933). Notițe (document inedit)", Sociologie Românească, 12 (1–2): 32–38, 2014
