= National Museum of Romanian Literature =

Museum in Chișinău

- Muzeul Național al Literaturii Române
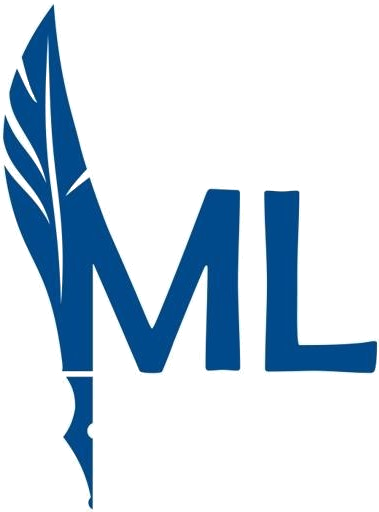

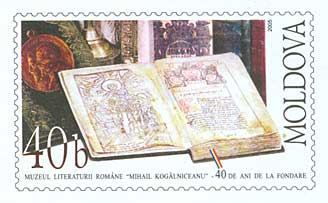
- 2005 stamp
- Established: 1 April 1965
- Location: 98, 31 August 1989 Street, Chișinău

The National Museum of Romanian Literature (Romanian: Muzeul Național al Literaturii Române) is a museum in Chișinău, Moldova.

== Overview ==
The museum was established on 1 April 1965, according to a governmental decision of the Moldovan SSR from February 10, 1965. Since the beginning, it was affiliated with the Moldovan Writers' Union. The first director was Gheorghe Cincilei (1936-1999). In 1983, the museum took the name of Dimitrie Cantemir, and in 1991 became Centrul Național de Studii Literare și Muzeografie „M.Kogălniceanu”. Since 1997, the museum has operated under the name Museum of Romanian Literature "Mihail Kogălniceanu".

The museum has over 90 thousand objects: secular and religious books (16th-21st century), manuscripts, art objects, and documents. Most of the exhibited books are the editions of the Romanian classics.

Hours of service: summer: 10.00 - 18.00, winter: 9.00 – 17.00. Friday – closed.
