= Barbu Brezianu =

Romanian poet, art critic, art historian and judge

Barbu Brezianu (Romanian pronunciation: [ˈbarbu breziˈanu]; March 18, 1909–January 14, 2008) was a Romanian poet, art critic, art historian and judge.

== Biography ==
Born in Bucharest, he graduated from Spiru Haret National College in 1928, having already shown an interest in modernist literature. It was his mathematics teacher Ion Barbu, also a poet, who nurtured this interest. When the latter, whose class was poor at its subject, heard the boys were publishing the literary magazine Vlăstarul, he began spending his classes talking to them about Edgar Allan Poe, Stéphane Mallarmé, Comte de Lautréamont, Arthur Rimbaud, Paul Valéry and other writers. Several of Brezianu's classmates became prominent in the literary field, Vlăstarul was edited by Mircea Eliade, two years his senior, and received contributions from Eugène Ionesco, who attended another school.

Entering the Law Faculty of the University of Bucharest, he received his degree in 1932. His father, also named Barbu, was a lawyer at the High Court of Cassation and Justice, and the son was expected to enter the same profession. His first volume of verse was published in 1929, which upset the father, as people thought he had written it; from then on, the son signed himself "Barbu B. Brezianu". He eventually became a judge. In 1934, he happened to purchase an 1867 first edition of the Finnish epic Kalevala, in French translation. The League of Nations was holding a contest for the best translation for the following year, the centenary of the work's publication. Working with this copy and with a 1931 French translation, also helped near the end by an employee of the Finnish Legation in Bucharest, he managed to publish a prose translation in 1942, prefaced by Ion Marin Sadoveanu. The Finnish government awarded him the Order of the White Rose of Finland and, in 1985, the Kalevala Medal. In 1943, with Romania and Finland finding themselves on the same side in World War II, Brezianu was a founding member of a friendship society linking the two countries.

In 1941, Brezianu worked as a grefier (registrar or court reporter) at the military court in Odessa, then part of the Romanian-administered Transnistria Governorate. He had pleasant recollections of the city, marred by the horror he felt at seeing hanged bodies as part of the reprisals for an explosion that killed several Romanian and German troops (see 1941 Odessa massacre). Later in the war, he was back in Bucharest.

As Romania's justice system came under the control of the Romanian Workers' Party and its Justice Minister Lucrețiu Pătrășcanu, Brezianu was obliged to leave his work and become an accountant in a wire factory. Soon, he found himself performing forced labor on the Danube–Black Sea Canal, which closed in 1955. Following his release, he was unable to return to legal work, so he turned to art history and criticism. He wrote studies about Nicolae Tonitza and Nicolae Grigorescu, but his focus, through articles and books published starting in 1964, dealt with Constantin Brâncuși. His most important book, which came out in 1974, analyzed Brâncuși's Romanian sculptures.
