= Criterion (literary society) =

Romanian literary society

The Criterion Association was a cultural group that held conferences, symposia, artistic events, and exhibitions in Bucharest, Romania, from 1932 to 1934. It was not the only such cultural group in Bucharest at the time but it attracted the most attention. Although its membership comprised many of the most promising minds of the Young Generation (the 1927 Generation), the Criterion Association was not limited to the Young Generation and therefore those two groups are not interchangeable, as they so often mistakenly are taken to be. The association was a fruition of the Young Generation’s ambition.

The association was founded by philosopher, critic, and cultural innovator Petru Comarnescu after he returned from completing his PhD at the University of Southern California. Criterion was based on the democratic principles that Comarnescu had observed in the United States. The association operated by popular vote of its members and its political events were presented in a manner to foster democratic debate. In addition to producing series of events exploring political ideas of the day (from communism to fascism), Criterion also produced artistic programming (from visual art to dramatic readings to live music). Their most notable series was the first: entitled “Idols,” in which they explored various iconic figures of the day. The list featured Mussolini, Lenin, Gandhi, and Charlie Chaplin, among many others. Criterion’s membership included historian of religions Mircea Eliade, Jewish playwright Mihail Sebastian, and absurdist playwright Eugène Ionesco. Criterion also had a robust female membership, including dancer and choreographer Floria Capsali, and actress and director Marietta Sadova.

The “Criterionists” were bound by friendship and the dream of a new, modern Romania. Initially the association was a safe space for members of all political leanings and their activity was perceived as a subversive threat to the Romanian constitutional monarchy. Having their public events suspended, Criterion successfully proved their apolitical motives to the state. Then they built a vibrant cultural scene that flourished for a few short years, before fascism and scandal splintered their ranks. The fascist Iron Guard had just moved their headquarters to Bucharest and started to recruit from within the association. Many of key Criterionists adopted rightwing politics and refused to talk to those who disagreed. The ultimate reason for the association's demise was a relentless attack by the press. The scandal involved the Credința ultra-conservative Romanian Orthodox tabloid newspaper, which executed a ruthless campaign to ruin Comarnescu’s (and other members of Criterion) reputations, accusing them of homosexuality.

Criterion has a romantic legacy in today’s Romania, yet very few books have been written about the association. Cristina Bejan’s study Intellectuals and Fascism in Interwar Romania: The Criterion Association (Cham: Switzerland, Palgrave Macmillan, 2019) is the first English-language study of Criterion and the most thorough to date in any language.

== Additional sources ==
- Eliade, Mircea. Autobiography Vol. I: Journey East, Journey West. Trans. Mac Linscott Ricketts. Chicago: University of Chicago Press, 1990.
- Vanhaelemeersch, Philip. A Generation “Without Beliefs” and the Idea of Experience in Romania 1927-1934. Boulder, CO: East European Monographs, 2006.
- Mihai, Constantin. Europenisme şi dileme identitare în România interbelică: gruparea Criterion. Bucharest: Editura Muzeului Național al Literaturii Române, 2013.
- Antonesei, Liviu. ‘Un model de acțiune culturală: Grupul “Criterion.”’ Cultură şi Societate. Edited by Alexandru Zub. Bucharest: Editura Științifică si Enciclopedică, 1991, 367-396. Expanded version of ‘Le moment Criterion. Un modelle d’action culturelle,’ Culture and Society, ed. Alexandru Zub. Iasi: Editura Academiei R.S.R., 1985, 189-206.
