= Dreptatea =

Romanian newspaper (1927-1947)

- Founded: 17 October 1927 re-founded on February 5, 1990
- Headquarters: Bucharest, Romania
- Website: dreptatea.ro

Dreptatea was a Romanian newspaper that appeared between 17 October 1927 and 17 July 1947, as a newspaper of the National Peasants' Party. It was re-founded on February 5, 1990, as a publication of the Christian-Democratic National Peasants' Party (Romania).

== Editors ==
- Virgil Madgearu (1927–1928)
- George Ștefănescu (1928–1930)
- Petre Ciorănescu (1930–1932)
- Constantin Gongopol (1932–1934)
- Mihai Ralea (1934–1938)
- Demostene Botez (March–July 1938)
- Ion Livianu (1944)
- Nicolae Carandino (1944–1947)
