= Pompiliu Constantinescu =

Romanian literary critic (1901–1946)

Pompiliu Constantinescu (May 17, 1901 – May 9, 1946) was a Romanian literary critic.

== Biography ==
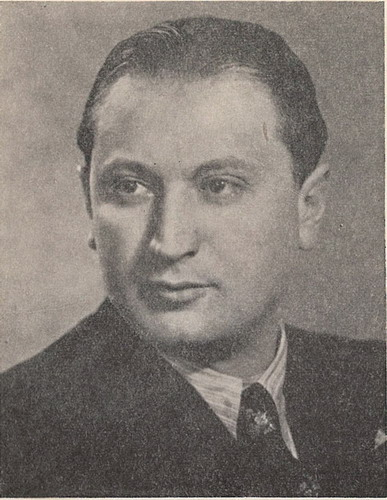
Pompiliu Constantinescu

He was born on May 17, 1901, in Bucharest, "in a place where he saw the light of day for the first time, on Sabines Street no. 109, the son of John Constantinescu, a customs house clerk, who studied much and of Vasilica Petrescu, nephew, on his father's side, of Constantine Constantinescu, originally from the vineyard village of Ceptura, who settled in Bucharest, as a vineyard owner and merchant" (George Călinescu).

He attended Gheorghe Lazăr and Mihai Viteazul High Schools in Bucharest, as well as educational tutorial classes, after which he attended the Faculty of Letters and Philosophy of the University of Bucharest. He published articles in Revista Fundațiilor Regale (The Royal Foundations Magazine), Kalende (Kalends), Mișcarea literară (The Literary Movement), Sburătorul, Viața literară (Literary Life) and Vremea (The weather).

Constantinescu became the director of the CFR High School Aurel Vlaicu, where he taught Romanian language and literature. He died from a heart attack on May 9, 1946, in Bucharest, while in full creative power.

== Works ==
- Mișcarea literară (1927)
- Opere și autori (1928)
- Critice (1933)
- Figuri literare (1938)
- Tudor Arghezi (1940)
- Eseuri critice (1947)
- Scrieri alese (1957)
- Scrieri, vol. I-IV (1967–1972)
- Studii și cronici literare (1974)
- Poeți români moderni (1974)
- Caleidoscop (1974)
- Romanul românesc interbelic (1977)
