= Cezar Petrescu =

Romanian journalist, novelist, and children's writer (1892–1968)

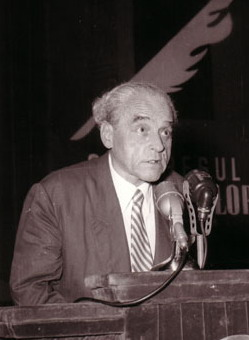
- Petrescu in June 1956
- Born: December 1, 1892; Hodora, Iași County, Kingdom of Romania
- Died: March 9, 1961 (aged 68); Bucharest, Romanian People's Republic
- Resting place: Bellu Cemetery, Bucharest
- Education: Alexandru Ioan Cuza University
- Occupations: journalist, novelist, children's writer
- Writing career
- Language: Romanian

Cezar Petrescu (Romanian pronunciation: [ˈt͡ʃezar peˈtresku]; December 1, 1892 – March 9, 1961) was a Romanian journalist, novelist, and children's writer.

He was born in Hodora, Iași County, the son of Dimitrie Petrescu, an engineer and a teacher. After attending elementary school in his native village, he pursued his studies at high schools in Roman and Iași. From 1911 he attended the Faculty of Law at the University of Iași, graduating in 1915.

Petrescu was inspired by the works of Honoré de Balzac, attempting to write a Romanian novel cycle that would mirror Balzac's La Comédie humaine. He was also under the influence of the Sămănătorul critique of Romanian society.

As a journalist, Petrescu made himself known as one of the editors of the magazine Gândirea, alongside Nichifor Crainic and Lucian Blaga. For a long time, he was a member of the National Peasants' Party, and wrote extensively for its press, especially for Aurora.

His major work consists of novels such as Întunecare ("Darkening"; 1928), Calea Victoriei (the name of a Bucharest avenue; 1930), Dumenica orbului ("The Blind Man's Sunday"; 1934), and Noi vrem pământ ("We Demand Land"; 1938).

Despite having directed the newspaper România, the organ of king Carol II's personal regime (1938-1940), and justified the antisemitic by-laws and laws of June-August 1940, Petrescu became a member of the Academy of the Romanian People's Republic in 1955.

Notwithstanding his prolific output as a novelist, Petrescu is mostly remembered for his children's book Fram, ursul polar ("Fram, the polar bear"—the circus animal character was named after Fram, the ship used by Fridtjof Nansen on his expeditions).

He died in Bucharest in 1961, and is buried in the city's Bellu Cemetery.

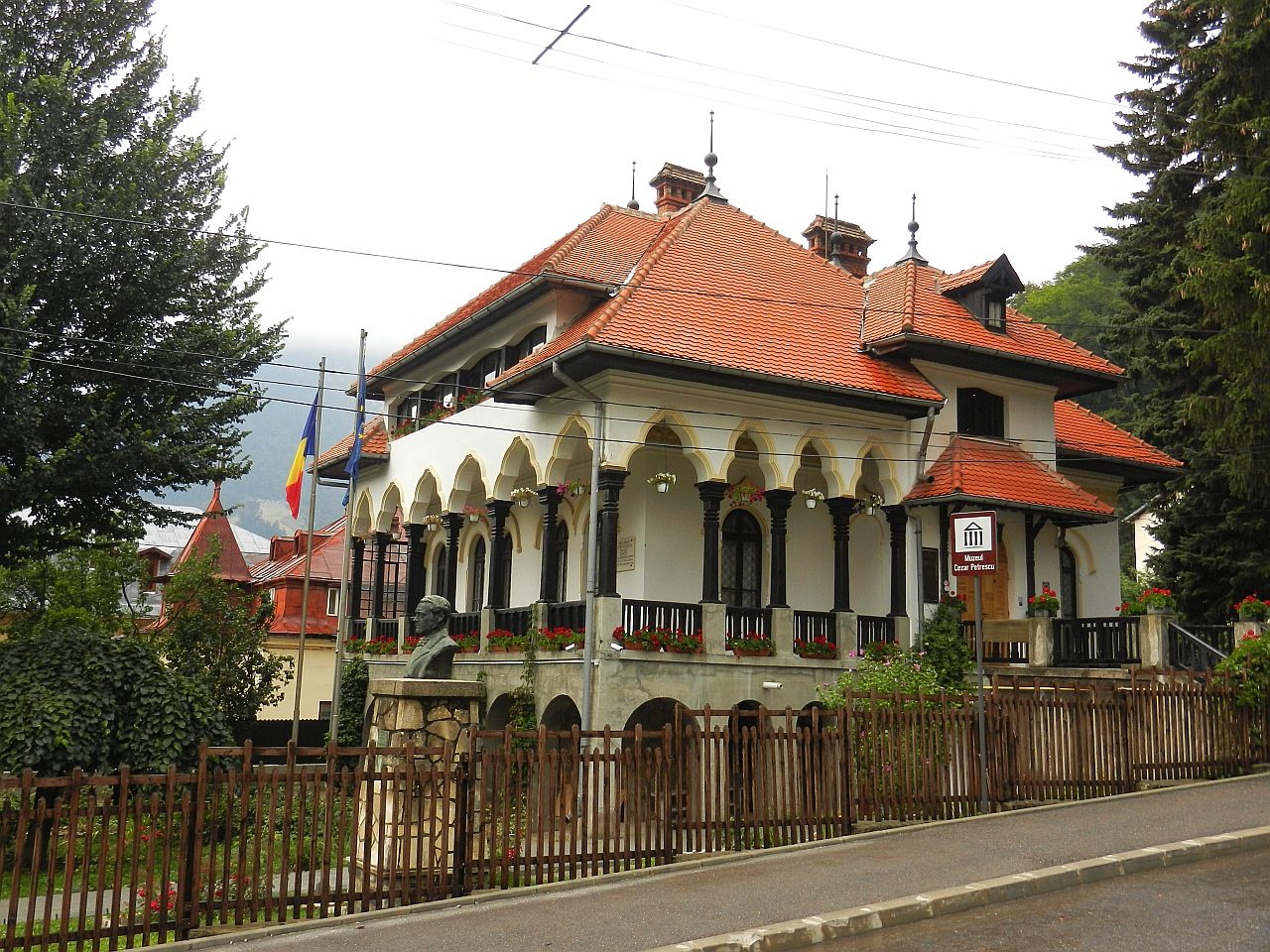
The Cezar Petrescu Museum in Bușteni

In 1967, a memorial museum was created in Bușteni, in the mansion Petrescu acquired in 1937, and lived in until 1960. Streets are named after him in Brăila, Bucharest, Bușteni, Cluj-Napoca, Dumbrăvița, Iași, Mangalia, Păun, Roman, and Târgu Jiu.
