= Virgil (disambiguation) =

Virgil and Vergil are the most common modern English names used for the Roman poet Publius Vergilius Maro (70 BC–19 BC).

Virgil, Vergil, Virgilius, or Vergilius may also refer to:

== People ==
- Virgil (name), a list of people named Virgil

== Fictional characters and stage names ==
- Virgil (The Walking Dead), a character from the television series The Walking Dead
- Virgil, AI character from the TV series Crash Zone
- Vergil (Devil May Cry), a character from the Devil May Cry franchise
- Virgil, genius orangutan from Battle for the Planet of the Apes
- Virgil (wrestler), character of Mike Jones, an American professional wrestler, in the World Wrestling Federation
- Virgil, a character from Xena: Warrior Princess
- Virgil Tracy, pilot of Thunderbird 2 in the TV series Thunderbirds
- Virgil, character from the film True Romance
- Virgil Hawkins, aka Static, a DC Comics character
- Captain Virgil Hilts, a character in The Great Escape
- Virgil Tibbs, character from In the Heat of the Night
- Virgil, joint main antagonist in The Warriors
- Virgil, supporting character in Left 4 Dead 2
- Vergil, an AI character in Halo 3: ODST
- Virgil, playable character in Arcanum: Of Steamworks and Magick Obscura
- Virgil, an AI character in Portal Stories: Mel
- Virgil Caine, protagonist in the song "The Night They Drove Old Dixie Down" by The Band
- Virgil Walsh, a character in Trinity Blood
- Virgil, a character in Mighty Max
- Virgil, a non-playable character in Fallout 4
- Virgil, a crewed subterranean drilling vessel in The Core
- Virgil "Bud" Brigman, a main character in the film The Abyss
- Virgil "Bull" Sharkowski, a character in My Gym Partner's a Monkey
- Vergilius, a character in the game Limbus Company

== Film ==
- Virgil (film), a 2005 film directed by Mabrouk El Mechri

== Places ==
Canada

- Virgil, Ontario

United States

- Virgil, Illinois
- Virgil, Kansas
- Virgil, New York, town
  - Virgil (CDP), New York, a census-designated place within the town
- Virgil, South Dakota
- Virgil, West Virginia
- Virgil Middle School, Los Angeles, California

== Other ==
- Sanctus Virgilius, student society
- Virgil C. Summer Nuclear Generating Station, an American nuclear power station
- Virgil (bucking horse) (foaled 2008), a rodeo bucking horse
- Virgil (racehorse) (1864–1886), an American thoroughbred
- "Virgil", a song by Kanye West from his unreleased album Cuck
