= Virgile =

Virgile is a given name. Notable people with the name include:

- Virgile Barel (1889-1979), French politician
- Virgile Bruni (born 1989), French rugby union player
- Virgile Boumelaha (born 1983), French football player
- François-Virgile Dubillard (1845-1914), French Roman Catholic cardinal
- Virgile Dureuil (born 1987), French comics creator
- Virgile Gaillard, French footplayer player
- Virgile Lacombe (born 1984), French rugby union player
- Virgil Partch (1916–1984), American cartoonist
- Virgile Piechocki (born 1997), French footballer
- Virgile Reset (born 1985), French football player
- Virgile Rossel (1858-1933), Swiss jurist and politician
- Antoine Virgile Schneider (1779-1847), French politician
- Virgile Vandeput (born 1994), Flemish-Israeli alpine skier

== See also ==
- Virgule (disambiguation)
- Virgil (disambiguation)
