= Virgil (name) =

Virgil is the most common modern English name used for the Roman poet Publius Vergilius Maro (70–19 BC). It functions as a given name or surname made popular by the fame of Virgil. The variant form of this name is Vergil.

Notable people with the name Virgil include:

== As a given name ==
- St. Virgil of Salzburg (a.k.a. Vergilius/Vigil/Fearghal/Fergal), an eighth-century Irish bishop and astronomer
- Virgil Abloh (1980–2021), an American fashion designer and founder of fashion label Off-White
- Virgil Aldrich (1903–1998), an American philosopher
- Virgil I. Bărbat (1879–1931), Romanian sociologist
- Virgil Bărbuceanu (1927–2004), Romanian equestrian
- Virgil Bernero, mayor of Lansing, Michigan
- Virgil Bogue (1846–1916), municipal planning director of Seattle
- Virgil Bouldin (1866–1949), justice of the Supreme Court of Alabama
- Virgil Brennan (1920–1943), Australian aviator
- Virgil Carianopol (1908–1984), Romanian poet
- Virgil J. Cox (1904–1991), American politician and physician from Virginia
- Virgil Donati (born 1958), an Australian drummer
- Virgil Earp (1843–1905), an American city marshal of Tombstone, Arizona
- Virgil Exner (1909–1973), an American automobile designer
- Virgil Finlay (1914–1971), a science fiction illustrator
- Virgil Fox (1912–1980), American organist
- Virgil Gheorghiu (disambiguation)
- Virgil Goode (born 1946), a member of U.S. House of Representatives, 1997–2009
- Virgilius Maro Grammaticus, a medieval writer known as "Virgil the Grammarian"
- Virgil Griffith (born 1983), the creator of the Wikipedia Scanner
- Virgil Alexis Griffith (1874–1953), justice of the Supreme Court of Mississippi
- Virgil Ivan "Gus" Grissom (1926–1967), an American astronaut and one of the first to die in the U.S. space program
- Virgil Hill (born 1964), an American boxer
- Virgil Hooe (born 1947/48), American volleyball coach
- Vergil Patrick Hughes (born 1955), birth name of American sportscaster Pat Hughes
- Virgil Moorefield (born 1956), an American drummer and composer
- Virgil Nemoianu (1940–2025), Romanian essayist and philosopher
- Virgil Parker or Tony Parker (born 1993), American basketball player
- Virgil Partch (1916–1984), an American gag cartoonist
- Virgil Walter Ross (1907–1996), American artist, cartoonist, and animator best known for his work on the Warner Bros. animated shorts.
- Virgil Runnels, Jr., real name of Dusty Rhodes (1945–2015), an American professional wrestler
- Virgil Severns (1929–2024), an American high jumper
- Virgil Solomon (1894–1972), a Romanian physician and politician
- Virgil Oliver Stamps (1892–1940), a shape note singer and composer
- Virgil Thomson (1896–1989), an American composer and music critic
- Virgil Thornton Sr., American politician
- Virgil van Dijk (born 1991), a Dutch footballer
- Virgil Williams, American television writer
- Virgil Wood (1931–2024), American civil rights activist and former Baptist minister
- Virgil Young Cook (1848–1922), American Confederate veteran and planter
- Virgil (wrestler) (1951–2024), stage name of Mike Jones an American professional wrestler

== As a surname ==
- Alto Virgil (born 1982), British-American basketball player
- Antha Minerva Virgil (1855-1939), American composer, journalist, and inventor
- Elizabeth Virgil (1903–1991), American educator
- Jalen Virgil (born 1998), American football player
- Lawrence Virgil (born 1990), American football player
- Ozzie Virgil Jr. (born 1956), Puerto Rican baseball player
- Ozzie Virgil Sr. (1932–2024), Dominican Republic baseball player
- Pedro Virgil, Australian photographer
- Polydore Vergil (1470–1555), an Italian-born scholar and historian of England
- Reggie Virgil (born 2004), American football player

== Fictional characters ==
- Vergil (Devil May Cry), the antagonist of the video game series Devil May Cry and twin brother to Dante (Devil May Cry)
- Virgil Tracy, a character from Gerry and Sylvia Anderson's Supermarionation television show Thunderbirds
