= Garabet Ibrăileanu =

Romanian-Armenian writer and sociologist

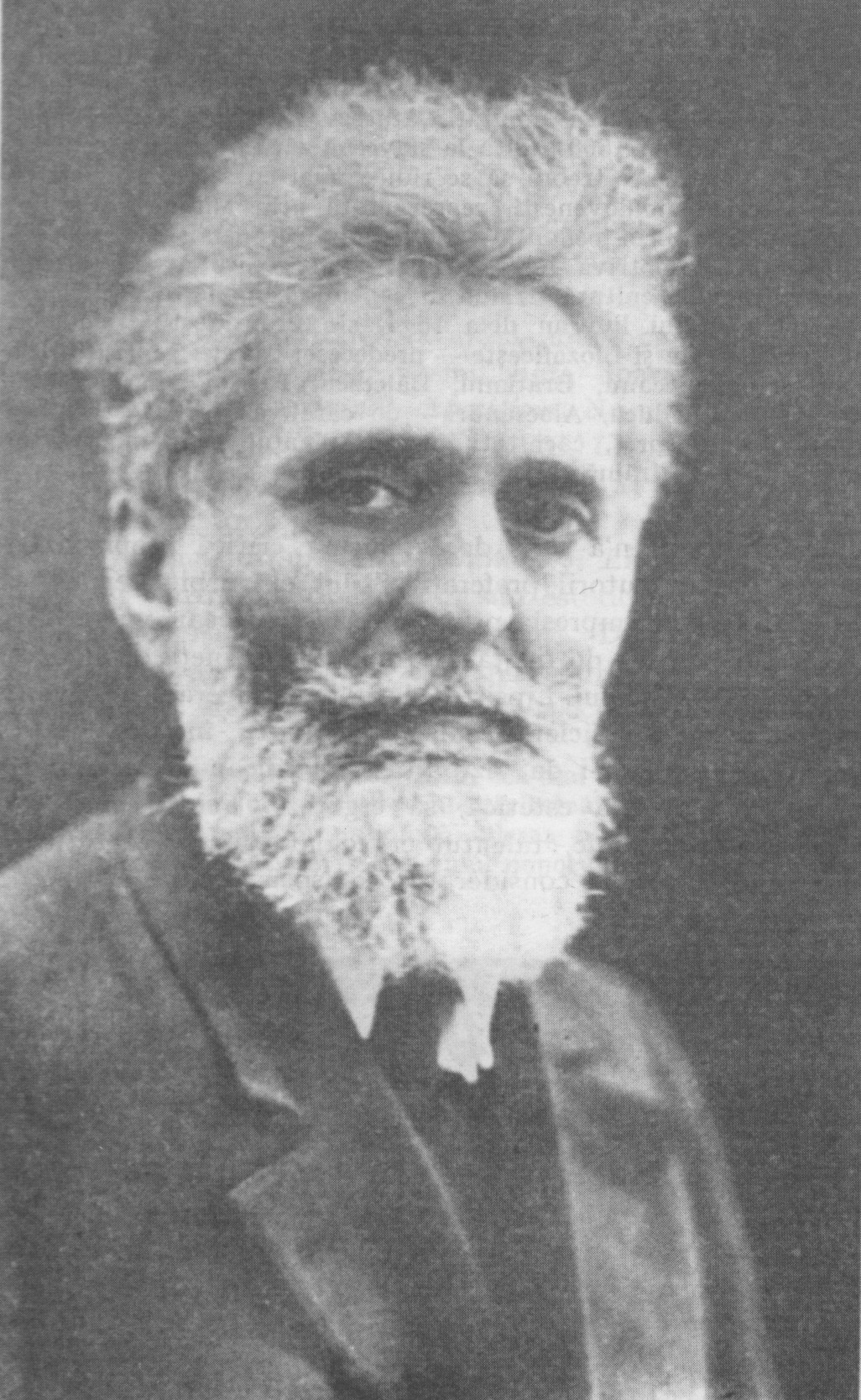
- Ibrăileanu ca. 1920s
- Born: May 23, 1871; Târgu Frumos, Principality of Moldavia
- Died: March 11, 1936 (aged 64); București, Kingdom of Romania
- Resting place: Eternitatea cemetery, Iași
- Education: Alexandru Ioan Cuza University
- Occupations: Literary critic, theorist, essayist, writer, translator, sociologist
- Spouse: Elena Carp (m. 1901–1936)
- Parents: Teodor Ibrăileanu (father); Maria Marcovici (mother)
- Family: Maria Ibrăileanu (daughter)
- Writing career
- Language: Romanian
- Period: 1889–1936
- Genres: Social novel; novella; essay
- Movement: Realism

Garabet Ibrăileanu (Romanian pronunciation: [ɡaraˈbet ibrə.iˈle̯anu]; May 23, 1871 – March 11, 1936) was a Romanian-Armenian literary critic and theorist, writer, translator, sociologist, University of Iași professor (1908–1934), and, together with Paul Bujor and Constantin Stere, for long main editor of the Viața Românească literary magazine between 1906 and 1930. He published many of his works under the pen name Cezar Vraja.

== Biography ==
=== Childhood and early education ===
Ibrăileanu was born on May 23, 1871, into a family of Armenian origin, in Târgu Frumos, Iași County, and attended the Roman-Vodă High School in Roman.

His father, an Armenian by origin, was named Teodor Ibrăileanu, and his mother, Maria Marcovici, was the daughter of Andronie and Vartenia Marcovici from the town of Roman, descendants, in turn, of old Armenian families from Moldavia. The parents, together with the child, moved to Roman in 1872, to Vartenia Marcovici's house. In 1876, Teodor Ibrăileanu, in an association, leased the estate at Poiana lui Iuraşcu (now Poiana Negri), near Roman, where the whole family moved shortly after. "Here, at Poiana lui Iuraşcu, I got to know nature," Garabet Ibrăileanu would write years later. On September 17, the same year, Maria Ibrăileanu died after giving birth to a little girl, Maria. Teodor Ibrăileanu remarried in 1877, as his son characterizes the gesture, in Memories, as one of the "household combinations".

In September 1878, Garabet was enrolled in a school in Bacău, but was soon moved to Roman, because his father had found a job as an administrator on an estate near the town, but fell ill and was withdrawn from school. Between 1879 and 1883, he studied at the primary school in Roman, and between 1883 and 1887, he attended the "Roman-Vodă" Gymnasium, where, starting with the second grade, he received first prize every year.

In September 1887, he enrolled in the 5th grade at the Gheorghe Roșca Codreanu National College in Bârlad. On September 21 of the same year, his father Teodor Ibrăileanu died.

=== Early career. Founding literary societies. ===
"Orientul" (The Orient) literary group on May 10, 1889, in Bârlad. Ibrăileanu (right bottom) photograpyed alongside Raicu Ionescu-Rion, Isidor Dinerman, Neculai Savin, Traian Cardaş, Gheorghe Ştefănescu and Dumitru Moscu.

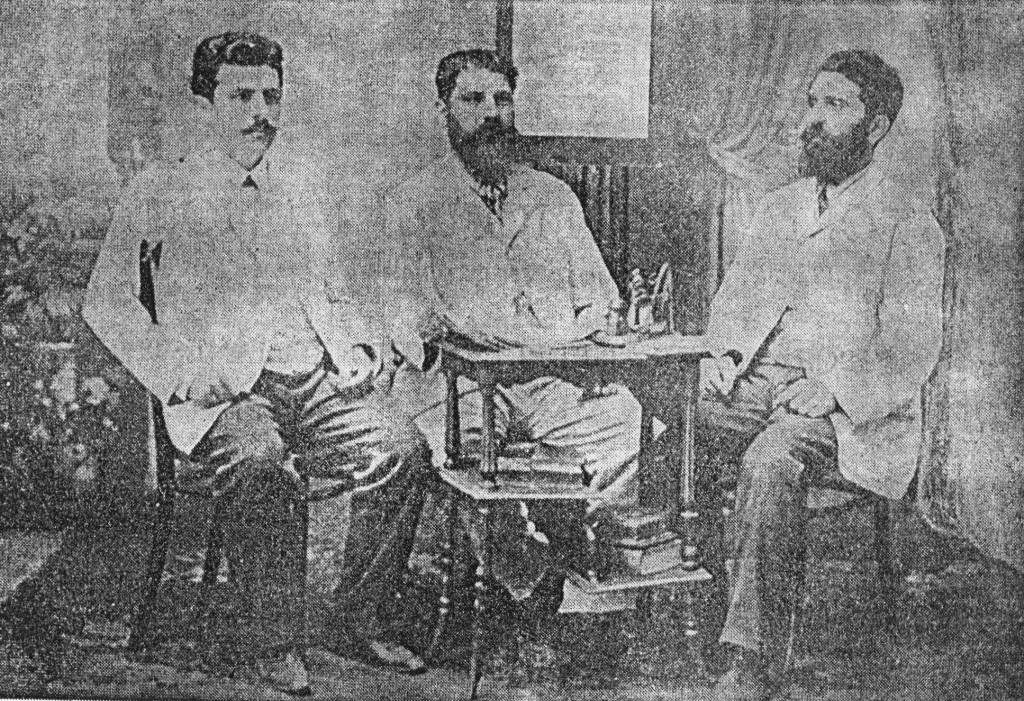
From left to right: Ion Botez, Constantin Stere and Garabet Ibrăileanu.

Ibrăileanu, together with other colleagues, including Raicu Ionescu-Rion, founded, in 1888, the literary society "Orientul" (The Orient). One year later, in June 1889, the society disintegrated when the students who had finished high school left Bârlad. On July 1, 1889, together with Panait Muşoiu and Eugen Văian, he edited in Roman, the socialist-oriented magazine "Şcoala Nouă" (The New School), which appeared until June 1890. As the editorial secretary, Garabet Ibrăileanu signed at the beginning with the initial I, from issue 3 – with the pseudonym Cezar Vrajă. Ibrăileanu had been attracted by the socialist ideas spread among the school youth in Roman by Vasile Morţun. In "Amintirile din copilărie şi adolescenţă" (Memories of Childhood and Adolescence), written by Ibrăileanu in 1911, he confessed: "The magazine was socialist, atheist, materialist, realist - in short, revolutionary in all directions!" The magazine Şcoala Nouă was considered "a magazine of a somewhat new type compared to previous socialist magazines", being oriented almost exclusively towards literature.

In June 1890, Ibrăileanu graduated from high school and in the fall, he took his baccalaureate exam at the University of Iași. He enrolled in the Faculty of Letters and Philosophy of the University of Iași; in his first year, he attended all the faculties, unable to find a place. In 1891, he took exams at the Higher Normal School. Some of the subjects were also taught by the faculty's professors. Drawn by the journalistic fever and socialist ideas, Ibrăileanu put higher education on the back burner, passing his exams late.

Between 1890 and 1894 we find him collaborating with the Bucharest weekly publication "Munca" (The Work) (1890) with political articles, with Adevărul şi Critică socială (Truth And Social Criticism) (1892) with critical articles, with "Evenimentul literar (The Literary Event) (1893 - 1894) - no. 1 appears on December 20, 1893, from July 1894, the editorial office moves to Bucharest; starting with no. 45, October 24, 1894, it merges with "Lumea nouă" (The New World). From October 1894 to February 1895 he collaborates with the latter newspaper which acted as an organ of the Romanian social democracy in Bucharest, being also an editor.

He graduated from the Higher Normal School in 1894, and in April 1895 he took the exam and obtained his degree in historical and philosophical sciences. He met Elena Carp (born May 25, 1873), his future wife.

During the 1890s, he was attracted to Socialism, and began a collaboration with the left-wing press - periodicals such as Munca and Adevărul. He adopted part of the themes and goals expressed by the defunct Junimea, merging them with the ideas of Marxist thinker Constantin Dobrogeanu-Gherea, into a new form of Romanian populism, making it the main attribute of the magazine he led. He is remembered as the first mentor to such diverse figures as Mihail Sadoveanu, Ion Agârbiceanu, Ionel Teodoreanu, Gala Galaction, Octavian Goga, George Topîrceanu, and Tudor Arghezi.

Ibrăileanu with his wife Elena and their daughter Maria in 1903.

In 1896, he translated Guy de Maupassant's novel Bel-Ami, signing himself as Cezar Vrajă. Appointed as a substitute at the Bacău Boys' High School, he did not report for duty on September 1. He remained in Iași, where he gave private lessons; he worked, under the direction of Alexandru Philippide, at the Academy Dictionary and spent his time with Elena Carp.

In April 1899 he applied for the position in Bacău and in September 1900 he was appointed teacher at the "Costache Negruzzi" Boarding High School in Iaşi.

In 1901, he collaborated with Constantin Rădulescu-Motru's publication of "Noua Revistă Română" (New Romanian Magazine). On July 5, 1901, he married Elena Carp. He filled in for one year, starting with September 1, the Philosophy department at the National College in Iași (formerly "Academia Mihăileană" (Mihail Academy)).

Between January and April 1902, he took the aptitude test to become a full professor. Maria, their only child, was born. On September 1, he was appointed provisional teacher of Romanian at the Iași Military High School. In March, April and May 1904, he traveled abroad with Elena, to Austria, Germany, Italy and Switzerland.

== Career ==
=== Literary writing activity ===
Ibrăileanu leaving his home for University (Roman Street, Iaşi), 1912.

Ibrăileanu collaborated in 1905, in issues 1-3 of the magazine "Curentul nou" (The New Current), edited by Henric Sanielevici. In March 1906, Viaţa Românească was published in Iaşi, with Constantin Stere as editor, Paul Bujor as editor, and Ibrăileanu as secretary. Until July 1, 1908, the magazine's editorial office was in Ibrăileanu's house; after the editorial office moved, the literary circle continued in the same place. On December 18, 1907, the Ministry granted him the title of permanent professor and on September 1, 1908, he was appointed substitute professor at the Department of History of Modern Romanian Literature of the Faculty of Letters in Iaşi. His volume Scriitori și curente (1909) was published; in February–March, he was hospitalized at the Sfânta Elisabeta sanatorium, Bucharest. In 1911, Ibrăileanu wrote a detailed biography that would be published posthumously under the title Amintiri din copilărie și adolescăţă. On November 5, he was dismissed by the ministry from his position as deputy, and Eugen Lovinescu, a doctor of letters in Paris and a university professor, was appointed in his place. Ibrăileanu enrolled for a doctorate in December 1911 and in 1912 published his doctoral thesis "Opera literară a dlui Vlahuţă" (The Literary Opera of Mr. Vlahuţă), after which he received the title of doctor. In June, the Faculty Council proposed the appointment of Ibrăileanu to the same chair; from now on, Ibrăileanu's life would be divided between the magazine and the university. Viaţa românească ceased publication in August 1916 and reappeared in March 1920. He would publish the volume "Note și impresii" (Notes And Impressions).

In his first major essay (1908), Spiritul critic în cultura românească (roughly: "Selective Attitudes in Romanian Culture"), Ibrăileanu analysed the trends in Romanian literature from cca. 1840 to cca. 1880, trying to establish what had been the characteristics of original works. This is the first draft of his theory of selection, through which he determined the relationship between social context and artists' subjectivism (using it to explain why original artists had been ignored in favor of conformist ones of lesser talent). His thesis found its first major critic in modernist figure Eugen Lovinescu.

=== Literary criticism and studies ===
He expanded the idea in works of literary criticism that are still influential: in 1909 – "Scriitori şi curente" (Writers and Trends); in 1912 – "Opera literară a d-lui Vlahuță" ("Mr. Vlahuță's Literary Works"), a doctorate thesis that featured one of Ibrăileanu's most quoted chapters, "Literatura și societatea" (Literature and Society); in 1930 – "Studii literare" (Literary Studies), containing his other major writing, "Creaţie și analiză" (Creation and Analysis). He also authored a volume of aphorisms (1930), and a novel - "Adela" (Adele) (1933).

Between April and September 1918, Ibrăileanu published the daily newspaper "Momentul" (The Moment), and in October, the Romanian Academy rejected his candidacy. The weekly magazine "Însemnări literare" (Literary Markings) was published from February to December 1919. At the urging of the doctor Francisc Iosif Rainer, it held a "popular course" on Romanian literature at the Iaşi Institute of Anatomy.

=== Social novel books and ideology ===
Ibrăileanu published the volumes of "După război" (After the War) and "Scriitori români şi străini" (Romanian and Foreign Writers) in 1921. Between 1924 and 1925, he writes the novel "Adela" (Adele) in its first version, which he reads to his wife and friends. In 1927 he works on an edition of Mihai Eminescu's poems that will be published in 1930 by "Editura Cultura Națională" (National Culture Publishing House). In the same year the volumes "Studii literare (Literary studies) and "Privind viaţa" (Looking Into Life) appear. Also in 1930, the editorial staff of the magazine Viaţa românească moves to Bucharest, being published by Adevărul. In January 1933, he retires from the management of the magazine, which will be taken over by Mihai Ralea, director for the ideological and political section, and G. Călinescu, director of the literary and artistic section. In May, the novel "Adela" (Adele) appears, for which he is awarded the national prose prize in June.

=== Illness and death ===
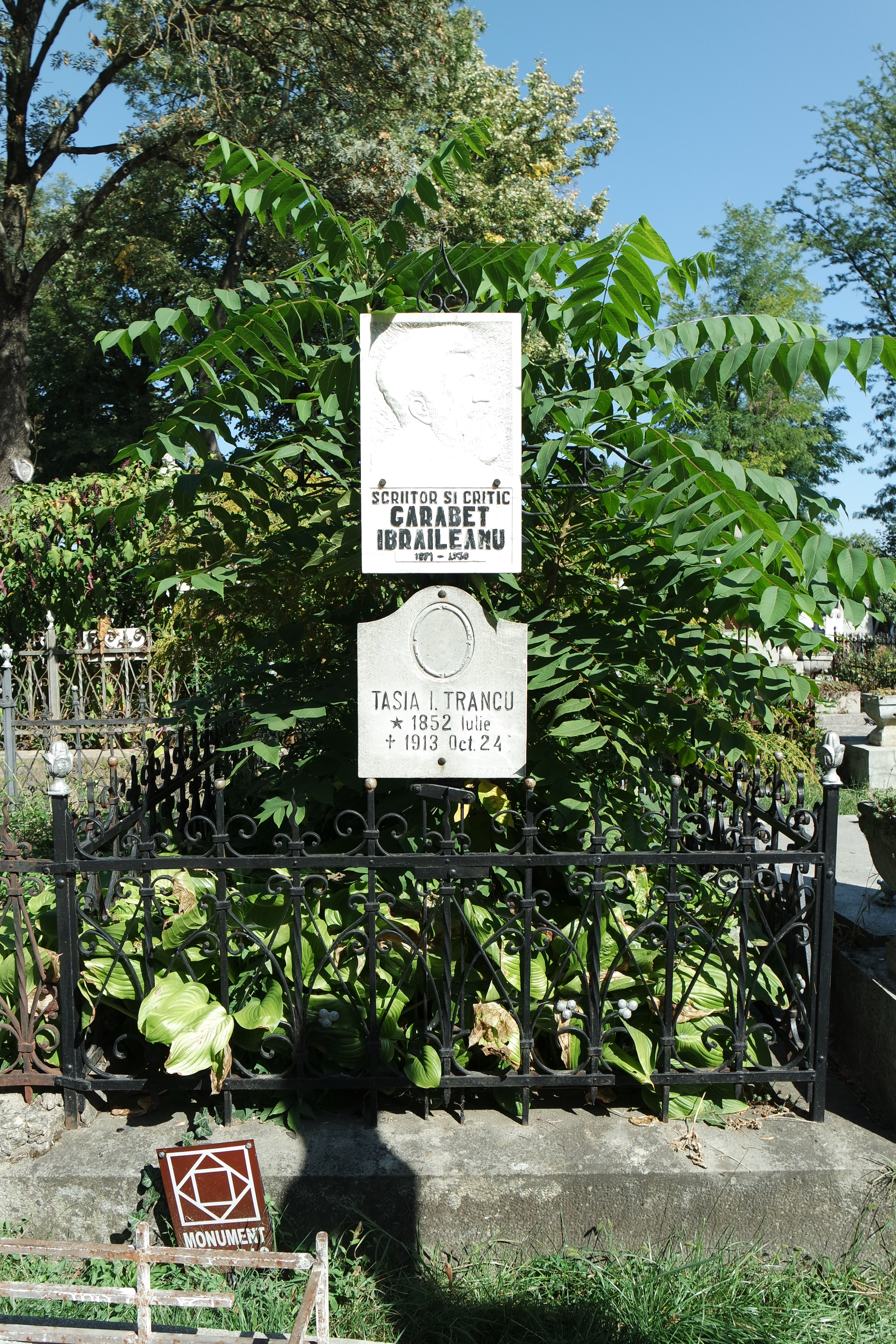
Ibrăileanu's grave at Eternitatea cemetery.

Ibrăileanu suffered from renal affections. In 1934, the disease worsened and by April, he underwent surgery in Bucharest. In the fall of the same year, he was admitted to the "Casa Diaconeselor Sanatorium" (now St. Stephen Hospital) in Bucharest. Ibrăileanu died on the night of March 10 to 11, 1936, in Bucharest.

On March 12, the professor's body was cremated and for a quarter of an hour the andante from Symphony No. 6 (Pastoral) by Ludwig van Beethoven was played to him. The urn with the ashes of the great departed was placed in the grave near the church of the Eternitatea Cemetery in Iași. Denied admission to the Romanian Academy throughout his life, Garabet Ibrăileanu received posthumous membership in 1948.

== Works and professional relationships ==
Between 1890 and 1895, Ibrăileanu attended the Faculty of Philosophy, History and Literature at the University of Iași, while simultaneously attending the higher normal school. During his university studies, he collaborated with various newspapers and magazines (Munca, Evenimentul literar, Lumea nouă, etc.), with articles with political-social content and a literary orientation.

In 1908 he occupied the chair of modern literature at the "Alexandru Ioan Cuza" University of Iaşi, which he served until 1934. Professor Ibrăileanu resumed the brilliant tradition of the Junimea society and the magazine Convorbiri literare by bringing together around the magazine Viaţa românească the most important writers of the era and by orienting the literary movement of the time in the direction of creation of a specific character, linked to contemporary national realities. Ibrăileanu's democratic spirit protected poporanism, in the 10 years of existence, from the first series of the magazine "Viaţa Românească (The Romanian Life), from excesses as well as exclusivism, allowing the important writers of the era, Mihail Sadoveanu, Ion Agârbiceanu, Gala Galaction, Octavian Goga, Tudor Arghezi, etc. to develop their activity freely.

== The literary critic ==
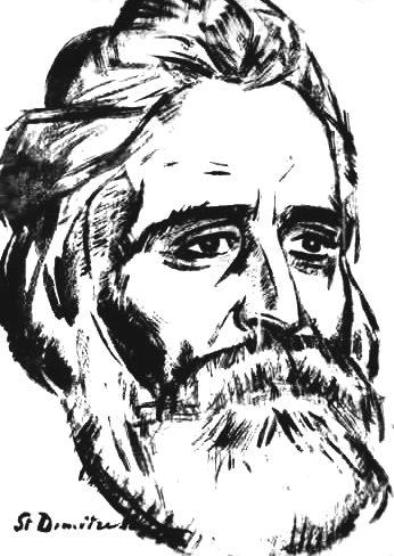
Portrait of Garabet Ibrăileanu, by Ștefan Dimitrescu

The critical work of Garabet Ibrăileanu, the third important moment in Romanian criticism, can be seen as a synthesis of the previous directions illustrated by Titu Maiorescu and Constantin Dobrogeanu-Gherea. Ibrăileanu's first important work, The Critical Spirit in Romanian Culture (1908) is a sociological essay. The author analyzes the genesis of cultural forms in Romania, taking as documents the works of the most important writers from the period 1840-1880, that is, from the moment of the appearance of Mihail Kogălniceanu's magazine, "Dacia Literară" (Literary Dacia) - where the critical spirit is asserted for the first time, condemning imitation literature and drawing attention to the need to represent the national character - until the establishment of the modern Romanian state, when Romania took on the physiognomy of a European state. This work by Ibrăileanu, of a captivating dialectical vivacity, contains penetrating observations on the attitude of the main Romanian writers towards the forms of civilization and culture in a process of four decades of development, passing through the bourgeois-democratic Wallachian Revolution of 1848, the Union of the Principalities and the acquisition of national independence. A nuanced opinion, with some critical accents, on the Critical Spirit in Romanian culture is held by George Călinescu: "...the book remains an admirable demonstration of sophisticated volubility and intoxication with ideas. It delights the intellect and invites it to think and is ... a masterpiece in its own way, which had an overwhelming influence especially in sociology."

His subsequent volumes of criticism-Writers and Currents (1909), Mr. Vlahuță's Literary Work (1912), Notes and Impressions (1920), After the War (1921), Romanian and Foreign Writers (1926), and Literary Studies (1930)-consistently offer valuable observations on both the classics (Cârlova, Alecsandri, Eminescu, Creangă, Caragiale) and the contemporary writers whose reputations Ibrăileanu helped establish (Sadoveanu, I.Al. Brătescu-Voineşti, Gala Galaction, G. Topârceanu, Demostene Botez, Mihai Codreanu, Otilia Cazimir, Ionel Teodoreanu, Henriette Yvonne Stahl).

The observation about the philosophical character of Eminescu's romances, about the short story character of Creangă's fairy tales, about the significance of comic names in Caragiale's theater and prose, the emphasis on the lyricism of Sadoveanu's prose, the psychology of the misfit in Brătescu-Voineşti's objective prose, Topârceanu's self-irony, Demosthene Botez's sincerity, the Rostadian pose in M. Codreanu's sonnets, the creation of types in Ionel Teodoreanu's childhood-evoking prose, all then became commonplaces of criticism, circulating detached from the author, as necessary truths.

Two original, resonant essays by Ibrăileanu are Literature and Society, published as an introduction to the doctoral thesis The Literary Work of Mr. Vlahuţă, and, respectively, Creation and Analysis from the volume Literary Studies.

In the first, the critic sheds new light on the relationship between the artist and society through the theory of selection, insisting on the correspondence between the artistic ideal and the aspirations of the public at a given time, a relationship that explains the fate full of vicissitudes of the genius artist, always perceived through one side of his creation, and the success or failure of the conformist artist.

In the second, Ibrăileanu establishes, referring to the contemporary novel, two more widespread types, one consisting of the presentation of the behavior of the heroes, their deeds, and the other consisting of the commentary on the states of mind, in other words the narrative novel and the analytical novel, the epic novel and the lyric novel or the objective novel and the subjective novel. Ibrăileanu's dissociations between creation and analysis, richly exemplified, show the advantages and disadvantages of the two procedures, clarifying some of the mysteries of the masterpiece.

A volume of aphorisms regarding the conduct of the wise man Privind viaţa (1930) and a novel analyzing the feeling of love Adela (1933), conclude Garabet Ibrăileanu's activity. For his work, the Romanian Academy elected him a posthumous member in 1948. Garabet Ibrăileanu was remembered as an impeccable professor, an imposing head of the circle, and an intellectual of high standing, whose work constitutes a moment in the history of Romanian criticism.
