= Virgula =

Virgula (Latin for "twig") may refer to:

- dowsing rod or divining rod
- sicula, the central rod of a graptolite
- spines of a ray
- stem (music), the tail of a musical note
- Virgula, a formerly recognized genus of moths now treated as Dichomeris
- Virgula Poenitentiaria - penitential wand in Rome

== See also ==
- Virgule (disambiguation), various medieval and literary punctuation marks
