= Ciprian Manea =

Romanian footballer

Personal information
- Full name: Ciprian Mircea Manea
- Date of birth: 13 August 1980 (age 46)
- Place of birth: Roman, Romania
- Height: 1.80 m (5 ft 11 in)
- Position: Goalkeeper

Youth career
- Laminorul Roman

Senior career*
Years	Team	Apps	(Gls)
1999–2004	Laminorul Roman	61	(0)
2005–2010	FCM Bacău	85	(0)
2009	→ FC Vaslui (loan)	0	(0)
2010	Politehnica Iași	1	(0)
2010	Gostaresh Foulad		
Total		147	(0)
- * Club domestic league appearances and goals as of 3 December 2019

Ciprian Mircea Manea (born 13 August 1980) is a Romanian former professional footballer who played as a goalkeeper for teams such as Laminorul Roman, FCM Bacău or Politehnica Iași, among others.
