= Roman-Vodă National College =

High school in Roman, Romania

Coordinates: 46.9254°N 26.9312°E

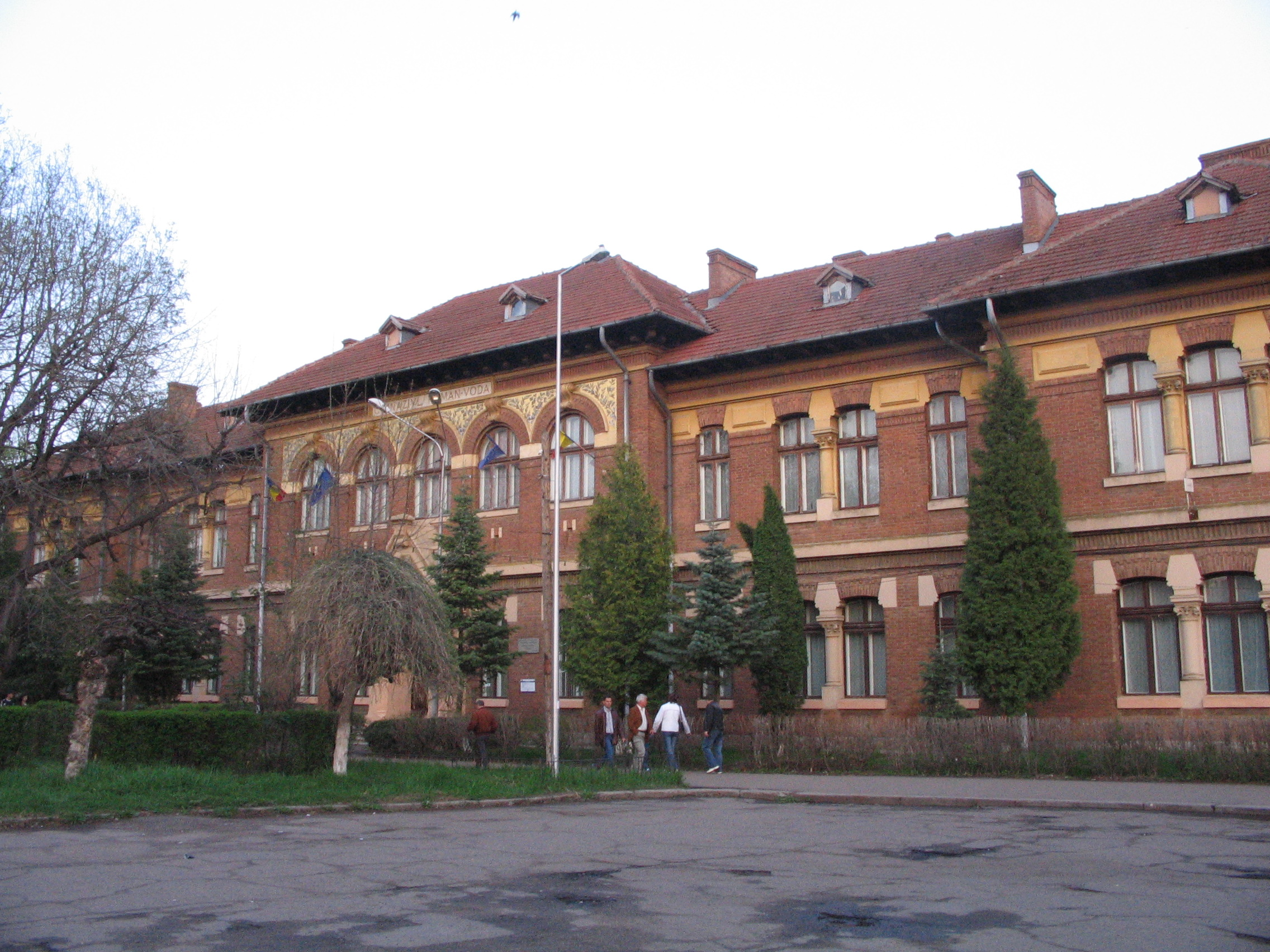
Roman-Vodă National College

Roman-Vodă National College (Romanian: Colegiul Național Roman-Vodă) is a high school located at 4 Mihai Eminescu Street, Roman, Romania.

The school opened as a gymnasium in the autumn of 1872, with two teachers. Its establishment had received legislative approval nearly four years earlier, but was delayed by lack of funds and seen through by local figures. It was dedicated to Roman I of Moldavia. Initially sharing a building with another school, it became overcrowded in 1875, due to the rise in the number of grades. The situation improved in 1881, when the gymnasium took over the entire building. The same year, George Radu Melidon was hired to teach history; he would have a significant impact on the development of the school and the town as a whole.

The school moved into another building in 1890; the current one was approved for construction in 1897. From 1891 to 1899, Calistrat Hogaș served as principal, also teaching Romanian and history. The building was requisitioned during World War I, when the school operated on the grounds of the cathedral, sometimes holding classes outdoors; some pupils left, while part of the faculty was mobilized to the front. The gymnasium became a high school in 1919. In World War II, the building was used as a military hospital, while teachers and students were evacuated to Dumbrăveni.

In January 1945, the institution merged with the local girls’ high school, becoming co-educational. The move was reversed afrer two months. The following years were difficult ones as the school struggled to maintain its standards; a key turning point came in 1948, when the new communist regime dropped the Roman-Vodă name and grade 12 was eliminated. A library was opened in 1965; two years later, the villa in the yard began hosting a school museum and magazine press. A dormitory was opened in 1970. The original name was restored in 1971, and the institution was declared a national college in 2001.

The school building is listed as a historic monument by Romania's Ministry of Culture and Religious Affairs, which supplies a completion date of 1899. Also listed is the adjacent Hogaș Villa.

== Faculty and alumni ==
=== Faculty ===
- Calistrat Hogaș
- George Radu Melidon

=== Alumni ===
- Florica Bagdasar
- Max Blecher
- Virgil Gheorghiu
- Garabet Ibrăileanu
- Andreea Marin
- Jean Mihail
- Cezar Petrescu
- Radu Timofte
