= Virgil Gheorghiu =

Virgil Gheorghiu may refer to:

- Constantin Virgil Gheorghiu (1916–1992), novelist
- Virgil Gheorghiu (poet) (1908–1977), poet and pianist who was immortalised in the work of Geo Bogza
