= Alto Virgil =

American and British basketball player

Alto Virgil (born 1982) is an American and British professional basketball player, currently plying his trade with British Basketball League team Sheffield Sharks, with whom he signed for in 2007.

Virgil, 6 ft 2 in (1.88 m) in height, was born in Livingston, New Jersey and attended Montclair High School in 2000 where he was the conference player of the year averaging 22.6 points per game. In 2002, he averaged 26.3 points per game for Passaic County Community College in New Jersey, where he was also named as New Jersey JUCO player of the year.

In 2006 the point guard signed professional with start-up franchise Vancouver Volcanoes of the International Basketball League, where he averaged 15.7 points per game. Seeking a new challenge, Virgil moved across the Atlantic later that year when he signed for Chester Jets. Virgil made his debut in the British Basketball League, the UK's top league, on October 6, 2006, in a home game against Scottish Rocks. The score finished 89–86 to the Jets, and Virgil claimed instant recognition as the game-high scorer with 29 points on the night.

Virgil played in all 36 league games during the 2006–07 season, averaging 36.86 minutes per game, and an impressive 18.36 points per game, becoming the club's second top scorer after Louis McCullough, the half-brother of NBA superstar Kevin Garnett, and the league's sixth highest scorer, with McCullough in fourth. He was also ranked fifth in the league in assists, with 4.58 per game, and tenth in free-throw shooting, with 78.30%. Despite these impressive figures, Virgil was overlooked by many as the Jets endured a dismal season and failed to qualify for the post-season playoffs for the first time in eight years.

On May 1, 2007, it was announced that Virgil was called up by Chris Finch to train with the Great Britain team, alongside Chicago Bulls star Luol Deng, in preparation for the Eurobasket 2009 qualifiers throughout the summer. He later withdrew from the team amid confusion of his British citizenship status, after various sources incorrectly claimed he was born in Liverpool as opposed to his hometown of Livingston, in the United States.

After his successful debut season in Britain it was no surprise that many big clubs fought to sign Alto, and on September 6 it was formally announced that Alto had penned a contract with title-chasing Sheffield Sharks, as part of Peter Scantlebury's new-look team.
