= Virgil Gheorghiu (poet) =

Virgil Romulus Gheorghiu (March 22, 1908–March 7, 1977) was a Romanian poet and musician.

Born in Roman, his father Miltiade Gheorghiu was a career army officer, while his mother was a primary-school teacher. He attended high school in his native town and in Bucharest, also studying piano with Emilia Saegiu (1923-1925) and taking courses from 1925 to 1926 at the Bucharest Conservatory, where his professors included Dumitru Georgescu Kiriac and Alfonso Castaldi. From 1926 to 1926, he lived in Iași, where he participated in the local avant-garde movement. This period followed an inconclusive literary debut with the 1925 book Cântările răsăritului, prefaced by Demostene Botez. In 1928, together with A. Zaremba, he edited the surrealist magazines Prospect and XX, literatură contemporană. From 1928 to 1930, he studied music in Vienna under Hugo Reinhold and Friedrich Wührer. From 1930 to 1932, thanks to a scholarship obtained through Ion Minulescu, then director general at the Culture and Arts Ministry, he studied at the Schola Cantorum de Paris under Paul Braud. While in Romania during this time, he attended Eugen Lovinescu's literary circle. In 1933, he received a citation for his performance at an international piano competition held in Vienna. From 1932 to 1939, he was a pianist in the Boniș trio. In 1940, he entered the sanatorium in Moroeni in order not to be drafted into the army; he was removed by George Enescu in 1943.

Gheorghiu undertook a sustained activity as musicologist and popularizer (Din muzica și viața compozitorilor, 1942, prefaced by Ionel Teodoreanu; Un muzician genial: George Enescu, 1944; Inițiere muzicală, 1946). A pianist with the Bucharest Philharmonic from 1948 to 1967, he participated in many foreign tours from 1955 onward. Throughout his life, Gheorghiu offered commentary and news about music in various newspapers and magazines (Credința, Lumea românească, România, Azi, Cuvântul liber, Muzică, Muzică și poezie, Contemporanul). He composed choral symphonies for soloists, choir and orchestra, symphonies and chamber music. At the height of the avant-garde and modernist movements, he published in unu (from which he was later dismissed for publishing elsewhere), Zodiac, Bilete de Papagal, România Literară, Cuvântul liber, Adevărul and Discobolul. Febre, which he self-published in 1933, marked a sort of new debut. Marea vânătoare (1935) earned him the Royal Foundation for Literature and Art Prize, as well as the Romanian Writers' Society Socec Prize. Cântece de faun (1940) won the Romanian Writers' Society prize for poetry in 1942. He also published Tărâmul celălalt (1938) and Pădure adormită (1941), followed by a long absence from poetry.

He returned in 1966 with the insignificant Poeme, while the comprehensive 1968 anthology Poezii brought him back into the limelight. During his last decade, Gheorghiu published five more books of poetry: Curent continuu (1968), Ținută de seară (1970), Trezirea faunului (1973), Sonete (1975) and Cântece finale de faun (1977). Cartea rondelurilor, which he had prepared for publication in 1977, appeared posthumously as part of an ample collection of his works, the 1986 Poezii. 1928-1977. He also wrote fantasy prose, partially collected in Acul de cravată (1966). He announced a novel, Taraful de noapte, and a musicological text, Trei romantici (Chopin, Schumann, Liszt), but these never appeared. Gheorghiu, who suffered from heart disease, died of shock brought on by the 1977 Vrancea earthquake, leaving behind unpublished manuscripts. Dual in nature, equally inclined toward avant-garde iconoclasm and formal rigor, Gheorghiu was an original creator of sylvan poems, refined and bucolic in inspiration.
