= Virgule =

Virgule ('twig') may refer to:

- A "/ " used to mark line breaks
- Secondary chord, in music
- A "|" marking poetic meter
- Virgule (online publication), a French-language online edition of the newspaper Luxemburger Wort

== See also ==
- Virgile
