= Virgil, West Virginia =

Virgil
- Unincorporated community
- Location within the state of West Virginia Virgil (the United States)
- Coordinates: 38°36′50″N 81°20′26″W
- Country: United States
- State: West Virginia
- County: Roane
- Elevation: 1,066 ft (325 m)
- Time zone: UTC-5 (Eastern (EST))
  - Summer (DST): UTC-4 (EDT)
- GNIS ID: 1741031

Virgil was an unincorporated community in Roane County, West Virginia, United States.
