= Roman, Romania =

Roman
- Municipality
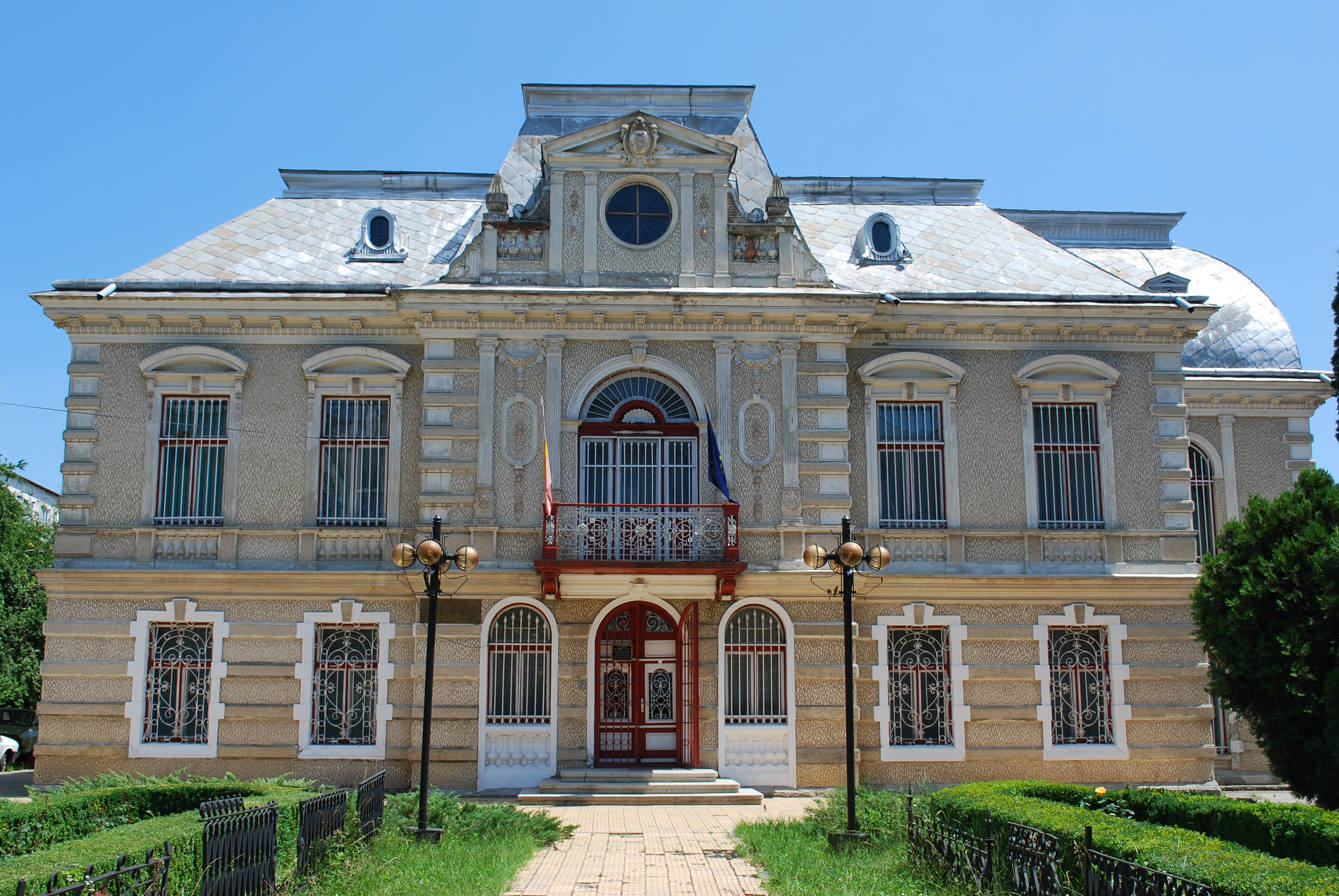
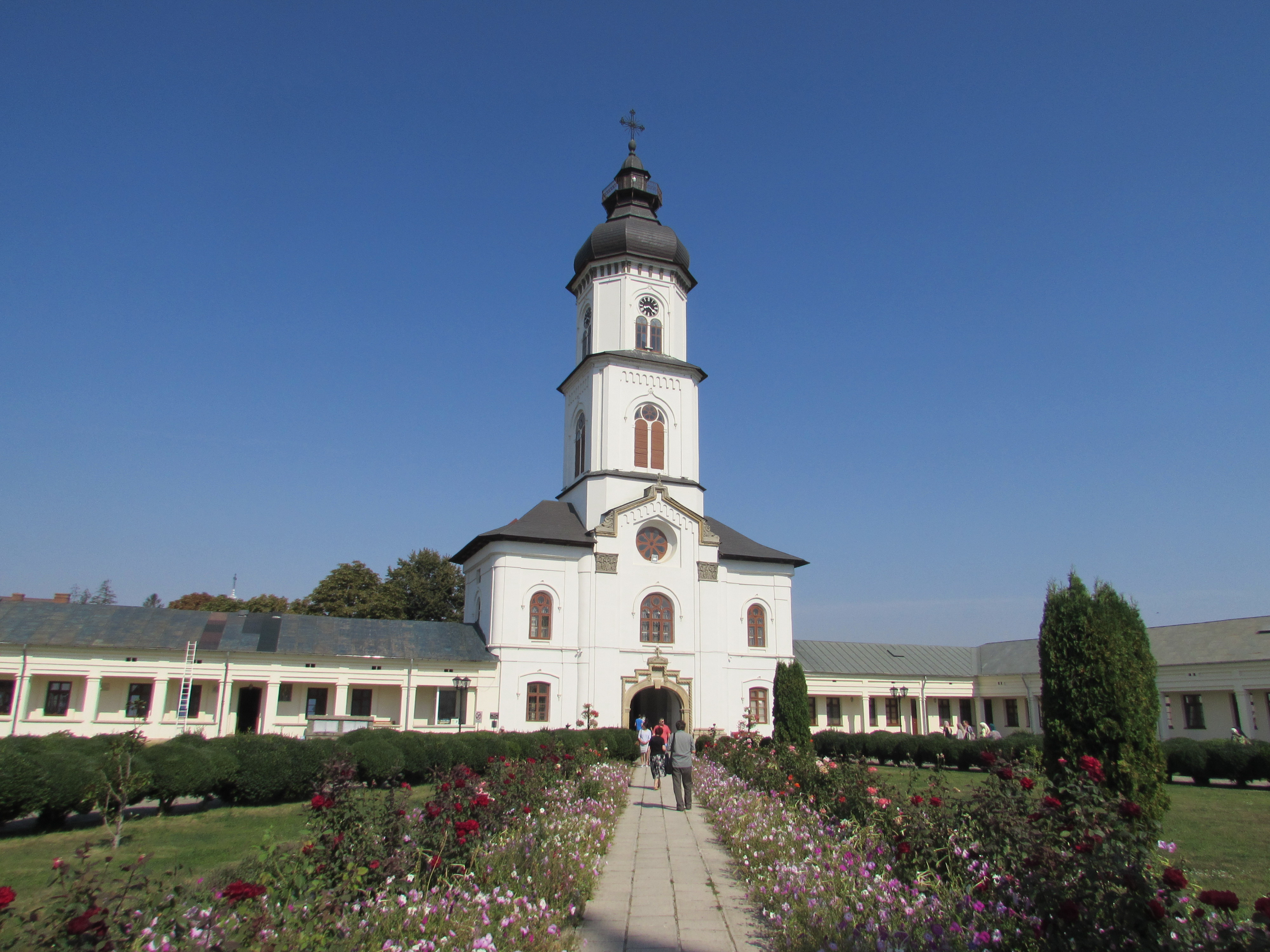
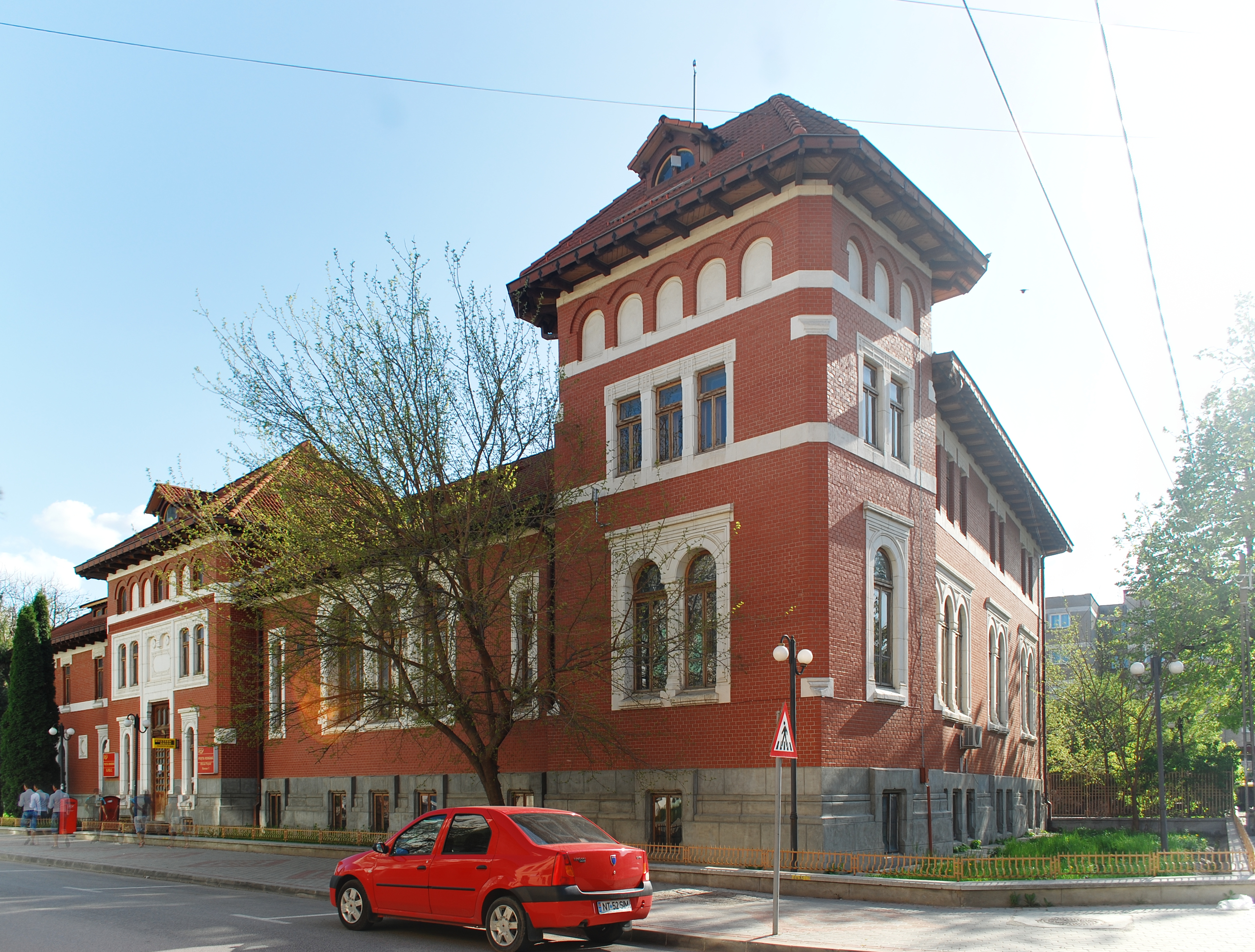
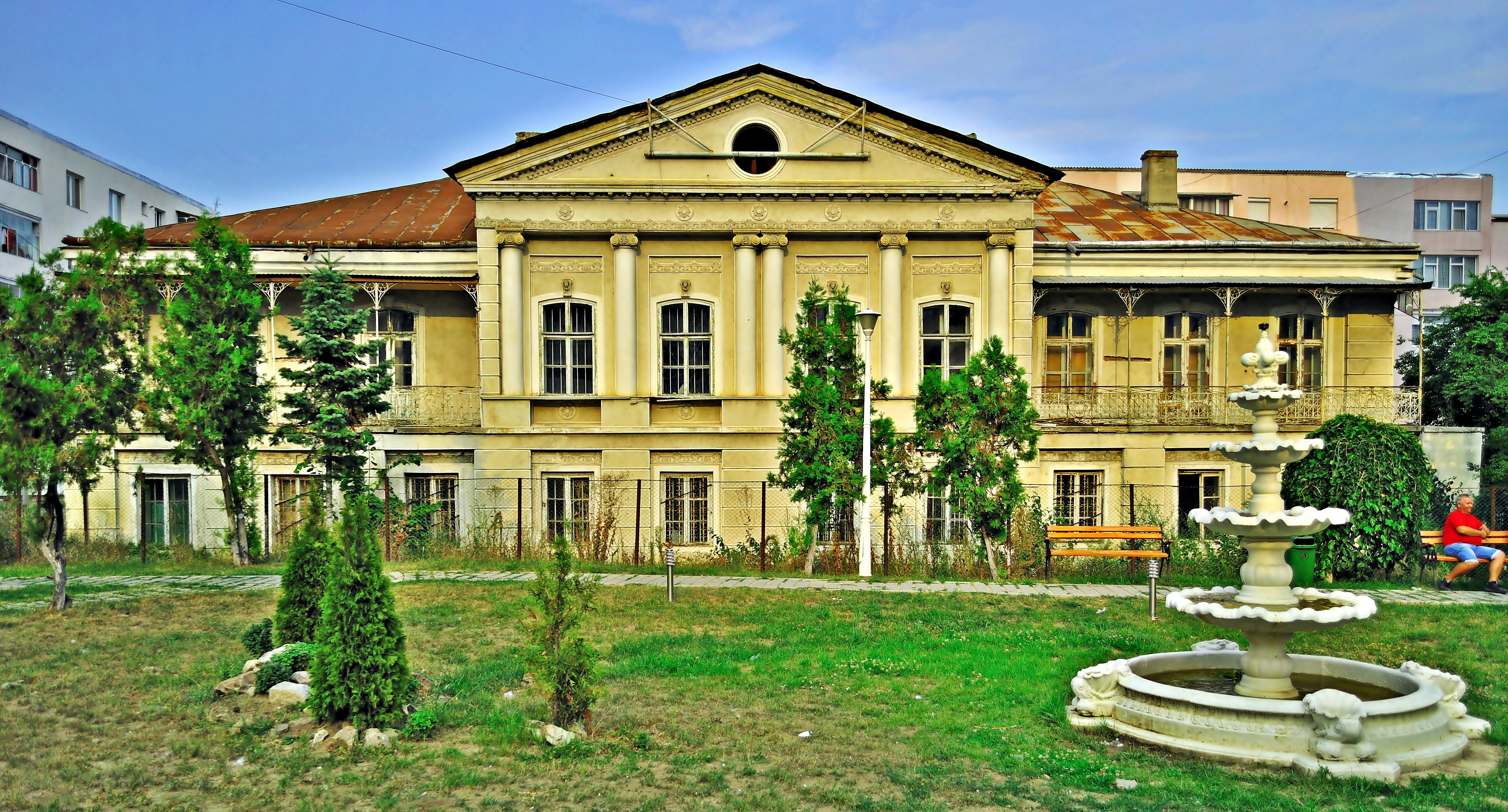
- History Museum in Roman (Nevruzzi House) Bell tower of the Archbishop Cathedral The Roman post office Sergiu Celibidache house

- Flag Coat of arms

- Location in Neamț County

- Location in Romania
- Coordinates: 46°55′48″N 26°55′48″E
- Country: Romania
- County: Neamț

Government
  - Mayor (2024–2028): Laurențiu Leoreanu (PNL)
- Area: 30.08 km^{2} (11.61 sq mi)
- Elevation: 195 m (640 ft)
- Population (2021-12-01): 48,644
  - Density: 1,617/km^{2} (4,188/sq mi)
- Time zone: UTC+02:00 (EET)
  - Summer (DST): UTC+03:00 (EEST)
- Postal code: 611001–611162
- Area code: (+40) 02 33
- Vehicle reg.: NT
- Website: www.primariaroman.ro

Roman (pronounced [ˈroman]; German: Romanvarasch; Hungarian: Románvásár) is a city located in the central part of Western Moldavia, a traditional region of Romania. It is located 46 km (29 mi) east of Piatra Neamț, in Neamț County at the confluence of the rivers Siret and Moldova.

Its name was taken from Moldavian Voivode Roman I of Moldavia. From here prince Roman realized the centralization of Moldavia, the city of Roman being the capital of the Lower Country of Moldavia (Romanian: Țara de Jos).

== History ==
The earliest mention of the city is in the Novgorod Chronicle (dated between 1387 and 1392). Five years later, the name appeared on a donation deed. The city is mentioned in a Moldavian document, signed by Moldavia's Voivode Roman I, on March 30. The document is one of the first of documents of the then-young state of Moldavia, being the first which holds a fully legible version of the Moldavia seal, bearing the aurochs, the moon, the star, and the flower, still in use on coat of arms of Moldova.

Roman became a diocesan see in September 14, 1408, when Voivode Roman I's son, Alexandru cel Bun, established an Orthodox bishopric in the city. The representatives of the Catholic population of Roman, shepherded by the Bishop of Baia, attended the Council of Constance in 1412.

Later on in the late 15th century, Ștefan cel Mare built a new stone fortress on the left bank of the Siret River, to replace the old earthen one. Several documents from 1458, 1465, and 1488 during Ștefan's reign mention the Cathedral of Saint Paraskeva (Paraschiva) in Roman. In 1467, the fortress resisted the siege of the Hungarian army under King Matthias Corvinus, before the Battle of Baia. In 1476, an Ottoman army, led by Mehmed II, besieged the new fortress again, with the Moldavians retreating after the Battle of Valea Albă.

Petru Rareș ordered the construction of a new episcopal see on the same spot in 1542. The old fortress was apparently destroyed by Dumitrașcu Cantacuzino, following Ottoman command, together with all other Moldavian fortresses. One of the last mentions of it dates back to 1561–1563 during the reign of Ioan Iacob Heraclid. The catholic community had its rights restored around the same time, in 1562, as Ioan Belusiuș, an agent of the Holy Roman Emperor Ferdinand I, wrote his master from Roman, after the severe limitations under Alexandru Lăpușneanu. In 1623, the Catholic community was described by the Franciscan missionary Andreas Bogoslavici in a letter sent to Rome, as Hungarian that understood and used Romanian. The Catholics appear to have a church dedicated to Saint Peter.

In 1569, Lady Ruxandra Lăpușneanu built an Orthodox church dedicated to the Holy Virgin (Precista Mare) on the same spot the eponym church is placed today. In 1595, the church Sfinții Voievozi was built. The current Armenian Apostolic Church was built in 1610. Some demographic data from 1641, recorded by the Vicar of Sofia, who was passing through Roman, shows there were 1,500 Eastern Orthodox, 450 Armenian Apostolics, and 30 Hungarian Catholics. A major personality of the city was Orthodox bishop Dosoftei, who translated the Psalter into Romanian in 1665–1671. In December 1691, Miron Costin, one of the first historians and writers in Romanian, was decapitated here on the orders of Prince Constantin Cantemir (Dimitrie Cantemir's father). Costin was in custody, being carried from Bărboși to Iași, where he hoped to prove his innocence; a few days earlier, the chronicler's brother had been killed in Iași, being believed to have attempted to obtain the throne for himself.

The first hospital in Roman was built in 1798 on the place where the Municipal Hospital Precista Mare is located today. Talmud Torah, one of the first Jewish schools in the Principality of Moldova, was inaugurated in 1817, an important event in itself as Moldova did not grant citizenship to Jews.

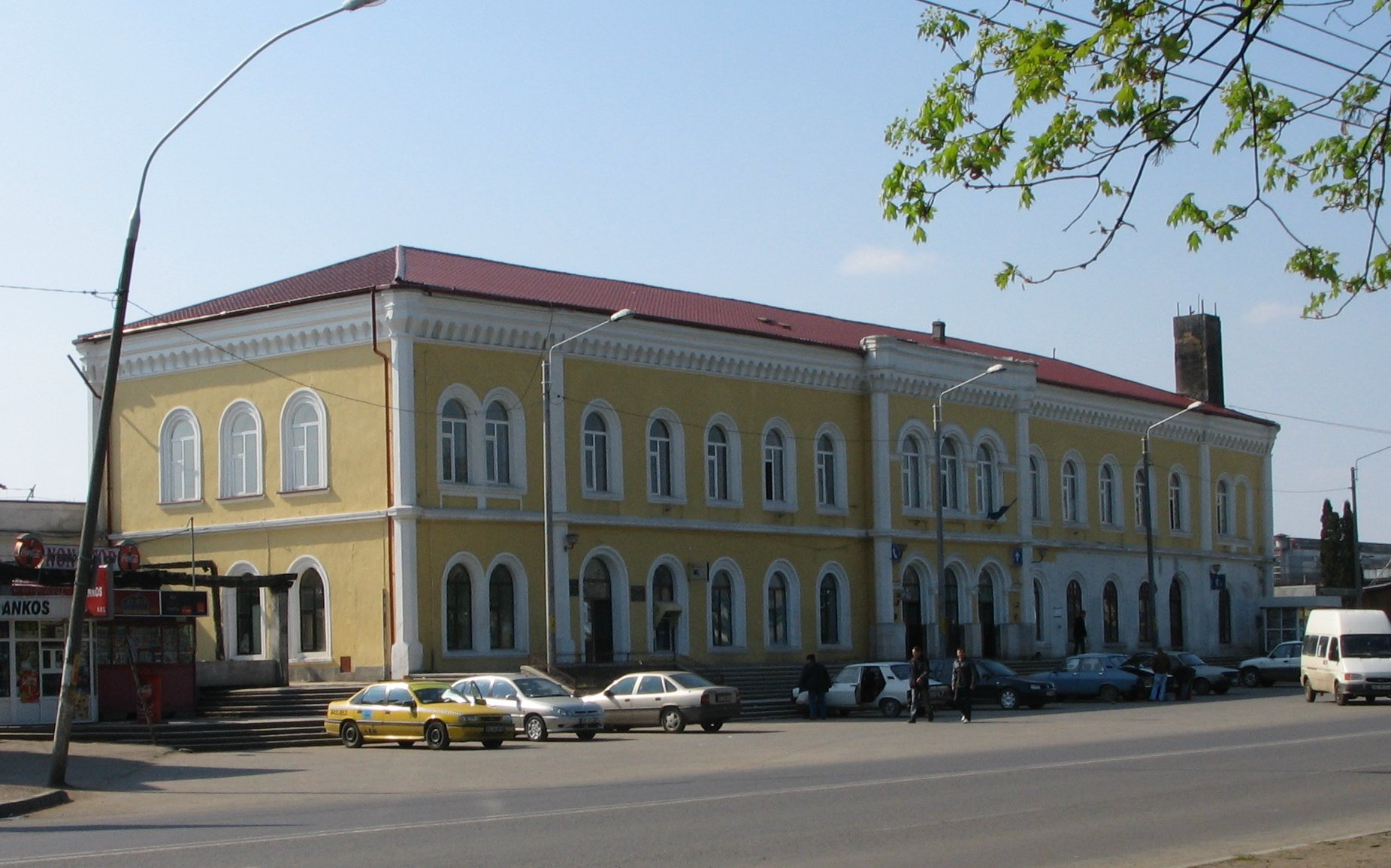
The Roman railway station

Roman became a railway hub in the 19th century, when the second railway in Romania was opened in December 1869, from Roman to Suceava (Ițcani). One year later, on December 27, 1870, The Bucharest-Galați-Roman railway was also opened, linking Roman to the capital via Mărășești, Tecuci, Galați, Brăila, and Buzău. Right after the inauguration, this railway was closed due to technical problems, but it was reestablished on September 13, 1872. At the same time, after a reluctant government gave its long-waited approval, the first high school of the city, Roman-Vodă, was opened on September 30 in the building that is still in use today as that of School No. 1.

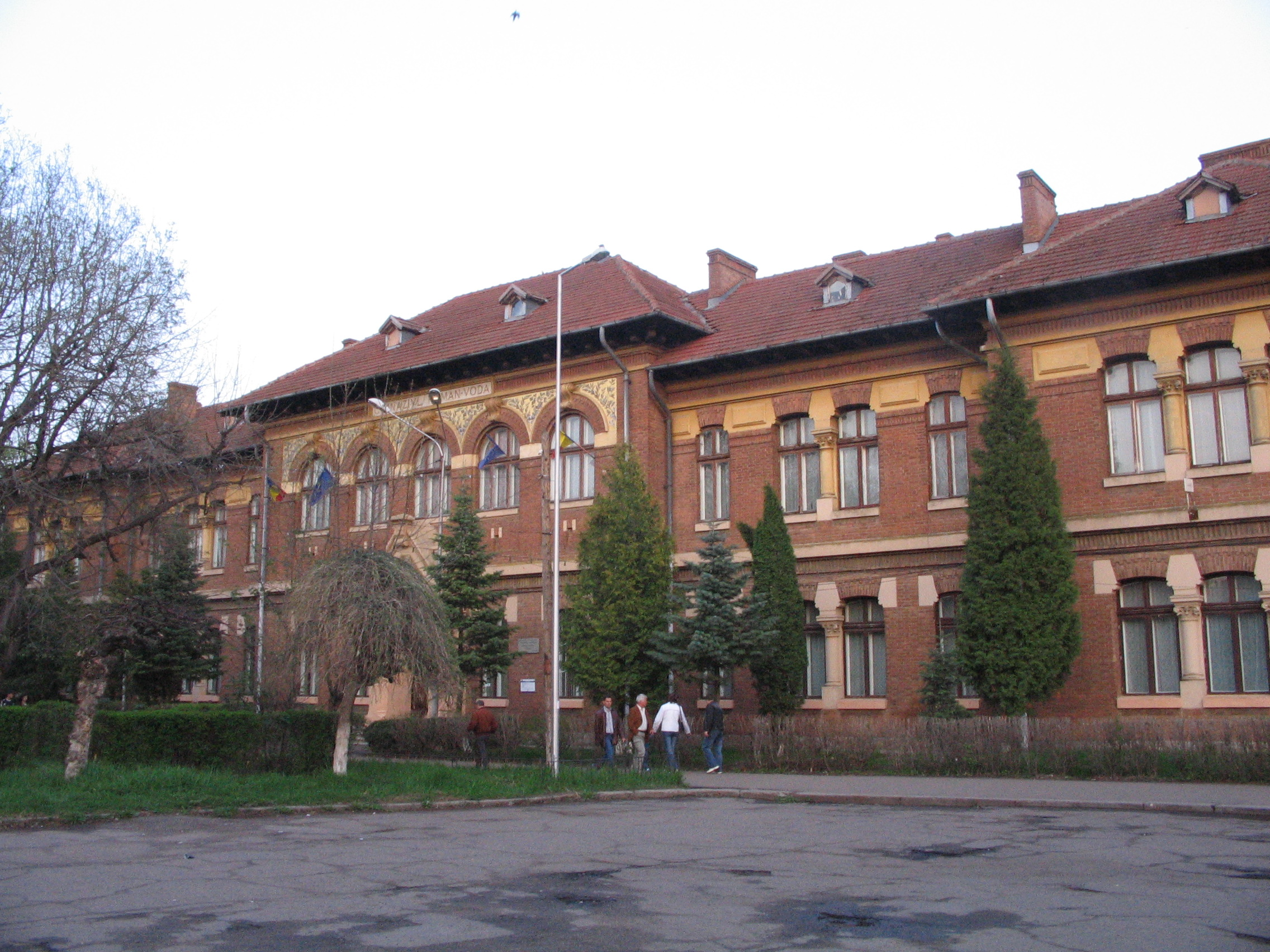
The Roman-Vodă National College building

In the Communist era, the city lost the county capital status, being included, in 1950-1952 and 1956–1968, in Bacău Region, in 1952–1956 in Iași Region, and then, in 1968, in Neamț County. It also became the target of industrialization: in 1957, the steel tubes factory started production. Roman became an important industrial center in Romania.

After the fall of communism in 1989, most of the heavy industry, relying strongly on state subsidies, went bankrupt and Roman's economy struggled. The steel tubes factory was privatized, and it is now owned by the Mittal Steel Company, and the economy started to recover.

== Geography ==
Roman is located in north-eastern Romania, in Neamț County, in the historic region of Moldavia, at the mouth of the Moldova River, a tributary to the Siret. The nearest large city is Bacău, 40 km (25 mi) away on national road DN2 and on the CFR Suceava–Bucharest railway; Piatra Neamț, the county capital, is 46 km away and Iași, the historic capital of Moldavia, is 80 km (50 mi) away.

== Climate ==
Climate data for Roman (altitude 216m, 2014–2026 normals, extremes 1886–present)
Month	Jan	Feb	Mar	Apr	May	Jun	Jul	Aug	Sep	Oct	Nov	Dec	Year
Record high °C (°F)	18.0 (64.4)	21.5 (70.7)	27.7 (81.9)	30.5 (86.9)	34.6 (94.3)	37.6 (99.7)	39.2 (102.6)	39.3 (102.7)	36.5 (97.7)	34.3 (93.7)	27.0 (80.6)	18.6 (65.5)	39.3 (102.7)
Mean maximum °C (°F)	11.9 (53.4)	15.0 (59.0)	21.2 (70.2)	25.3 (77.5)	28.9 (84.0)	33.2 (91.8)	34.3 (93.7)	34.8 (94.6)	31.6 (88.9)	25.4 (77.7)	19.0 (66.2)	12.9 (55.2)	35.3 (95.5)
Mean daily maximum °C (°F)	2.6 (36.7)	5.2 (41.4)	11.0 (51.8)	16.5 (61.7)	21.6 (70.9)	26.6 (79.9)	28.4 (83.1)	28.9 (84.0)	23.8 (74.8)	16.4 (61.5)	8.8 (47.8)	4.3 (39.7)	16.2 (61.1)
Daily mean °C (°F)	−0.9 (30.4)	1.4 (34.5)	5.9 (42.6)	10.6 (51.1)	15.6 (60.1)	20.6 (69.1)	22.1 (71.8)	22.1 (71.8)	17.5 (63.5)	11.1 (52.0)	5.3 (41.5)	1.4 (34.5)	11.1 (51.9)
Mean daily minimum °C (°F)	−4.4 (24.1)	−2.4 (27.7)	0.8 (33.4)	4.8 (40.6)	9.7 (49.5)	14.6 (58.3)	15.8 (60.4)	15.3 (59.5)	11.3 (52.3)	5.7 (42.3)	1.9 (35.4)	−1.5 (29.3)	6.0 (42.7)
Mean minimum °C (°F)	−15.8 (3.6)	−11.5 (11.3)	−6.1 (21.0)	−1.9 (28.6)	3.1 (37.6)	9.1 (48.4)	10.5 (50.9)	10.2 (50.4)	3.8 (38.8)	−1.2 (29.8)	−4.7 (23.5)	−8.8 (16.2)	−16.9 (1.6)
Record low °C (°F)	−35.0 (−31.0)	−33.2 (−27.8)	−24.0 (−11.2)	−11.8 (10.8)	−4.0 (24.8)	1.4 (34.5)	3.0 (37.4)	3.0 (37.4)	−5.0 (23.0)	−17.0 (1.4)	−25.4 (−13.7)	−29.5 (−21.1)	−35.0 (−31.0)
Average precipitation mm (inches)	16.9 (0.67)	17.2 (0.68)	30.9 (1.22)	37.4 (1.47)	60.9 (2.40)	87.4 (3.44)	61.3 (2.41)	36.0 (1.42)	49.3 (1.94)	52.2 (2.06)	34.6 (1.36)	24.5 (0.96)	508.6 (20.03)
Average precipitation days (≥ 1.0 mm)	4.7	4.8	5.8	6.2	7.8	8.7	7.7	4.4	5.3	5.2	5.9	5.6	72.1
Average snowy days	5.9	4.8	2.6	1.4	0	0	0	0	0	0	2.1	4.8	21.6
Source: Meteomanz (2014-2026); ANM; Teza Doctorat (1886-2010)

== Demographics ==
Historical population
Year	Pop.	±%
1859	10,818	—
1899	16,288	+50.6%
1912	18,128	+11.3%
1930	28,823	+59.0%
1948	23,701	−17.8%
1956	27,948	+17.9%
1966	39,012	+39.6%
1977	51,132	+31.1%
1992	80,328	+57.1%
2002	69,483	−13.5%
2011	50,713	−27.0%
2021	48,644	−4.1%
Source: Census data

== Notable people ==
- Ion S. Antoniu
- Daniel Baston
- Ernest Broșteanu
- F. Brunea-Fox
- Sergiu Celibidache
- Corneliu Codreanu (footballer)
- Gheorghe Dănilă
- Iliuță Dăscălescu
- Constantin Drugă
- Zicman Feider
- Gheorghe Flondor
- Bianca Ghelber
- Serban Ghenea
- Adrian Gheorghiu
- Virgil Gheorghiu (poet)
- Ion V. Gruia
- Ion Ionescu de la Brad
- Dumitru Irimia
- Constantin Istrati
- Ana Maria Iuganu
- Mihail Jora
- Zizi Lambrino
- Ciprian Manea
- Andreea Marin
- George Radu Melidon
- Petru Th. Missir
- Vasile Morțun
- Tereza Pîslaru
- Mădălin Popa
- Cornel Popescu
- Andrei Răuță
- Paul Riegler
- Nae Roman
- Simona Spiridon
- Sandu Sticlaru
- Ion Strat
- Sorin Tabacariu
- Sorin Ovidiu Vântu
- Haralamb Zincă

== Twin towns – sister cities ==
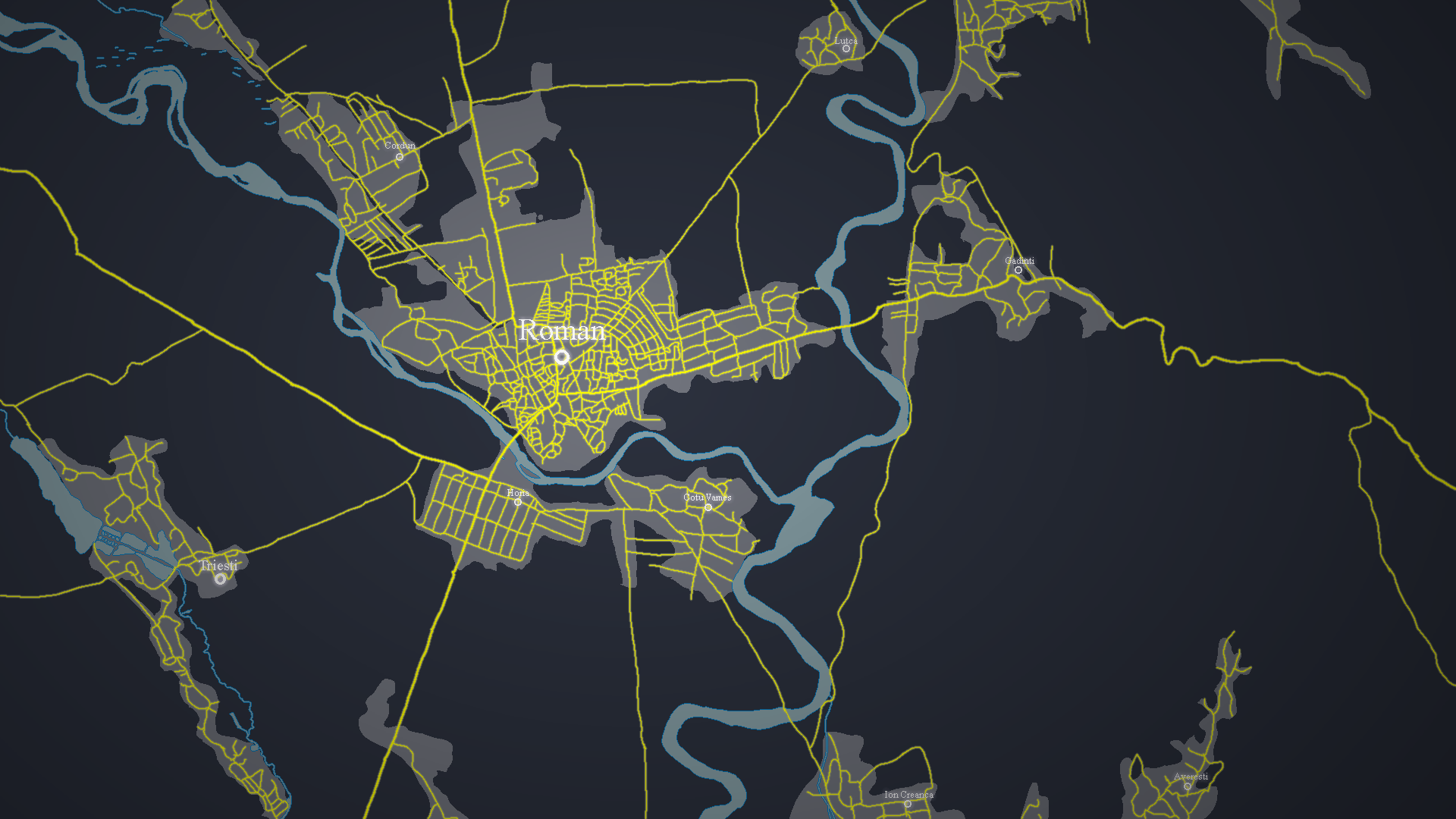
Road Map of Roman

Roman is twinned with:

- Dilijan, Armenia
- Edineț, Moldova
- Gedera, Israel
- Grugliasco, Italy
- Ștefan Vodă, Moldova
- Sunchang, South Korea
- Samothraki, Greece
