= Petite messe solennelle =

1863 missa solemnis by Gioachino Rossini

- Mass by Gioachino Rossini
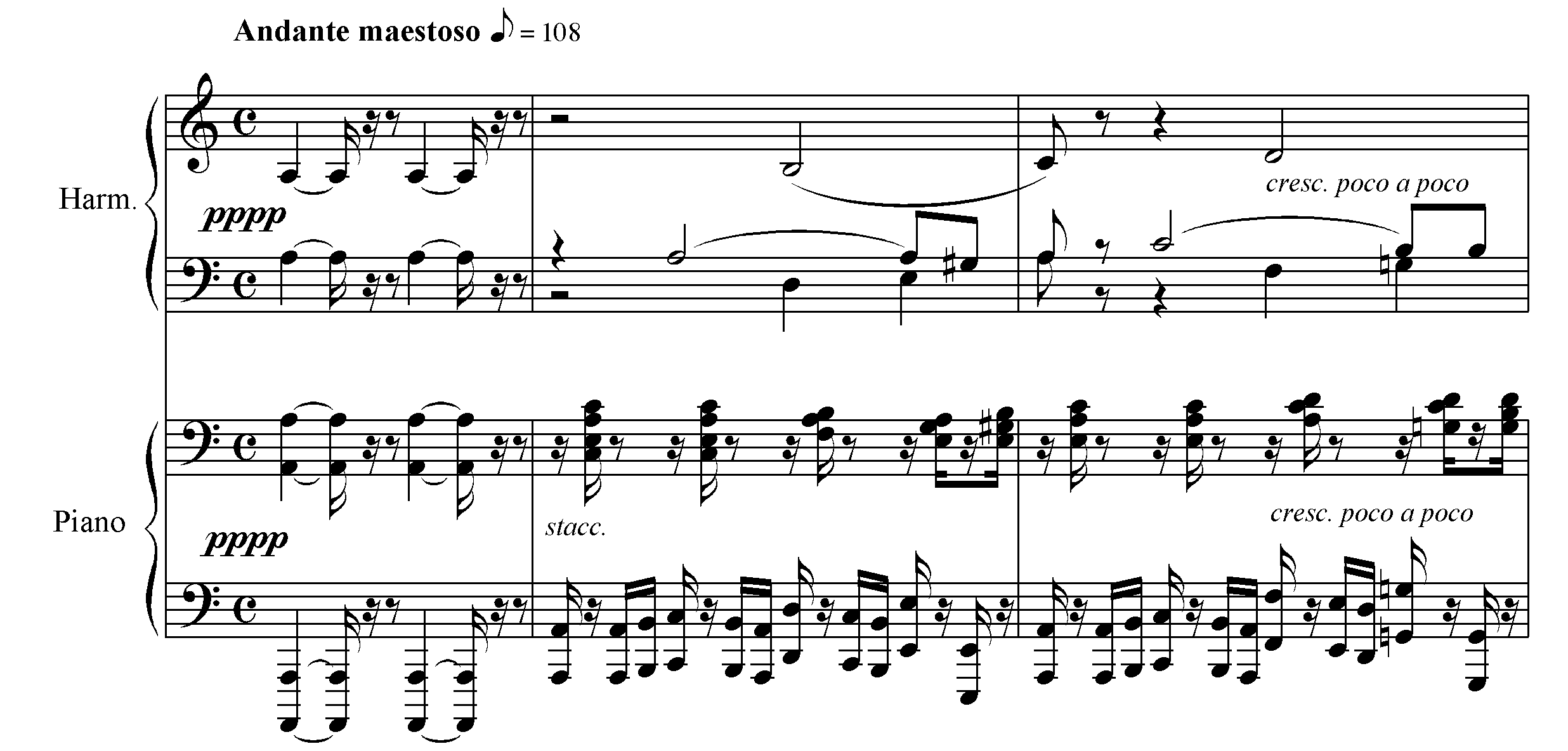
- Beginning of the work with an ostinato of the piano and a counterpoint of the harmonium
- English: Little solemn mass
- Form: Missa solemnis
- Text: Order of Mass; "O salutaris hostia"
- Language: Latin
- Dedication: Louise, Countess of Pillet-Will
- Performed: 14 March 1864; 162 years ago Paris, France
- Movements: 14
- Vocal: SATB choir and solo
- Instrumental: 2 pianos; harmonium

Petite messe solennelle
- Orchestral version
- Performed: 24 February 1869; 157 years ago by Théâtre-Italien, Paris
- Vocal: SATB choir and solo
- Instrumental: Orchestra

Gioachino Rossini's Petite messe solennelle (Little Solemn Mass) was written in 1863, possibly at the request of Count Alexis Pillet-Will for his wife Louise, to whom it is dedicated. The composer, who had retired from composing operas more than 30 years before, described it as "the last of my péchés de vieillesse" (sins of old age). (Note: A few piano pieces follow it, and a piece for the opening of the Exposition Universelle of 1867.)

The extended work is a missa solemnis (solemn Mass), but Rossini ironically labeled it petite (little). He scored it originally for twelve singers, four of them soloists, two pianos and harmonium. The mass was first performed on 14 March 1864 at the couple's new home in Paris. Rossini later produced an orchestral version, including an additional movement, a setting of the hymn "O salutaris hostia" as a soprano aria. This version was not performed during his lifetime because he was unable to obtain permission to have female singers in a church. It was finally performed at the Salle Ventadour in Paris by the company of the Théâtre-Italien on 24 February 1869, three months after his death.

While publications began that year, the first critical edition appeared only in 1980, followed by more editions in 1992, the bicentenary of the composer's birth.

== History ==
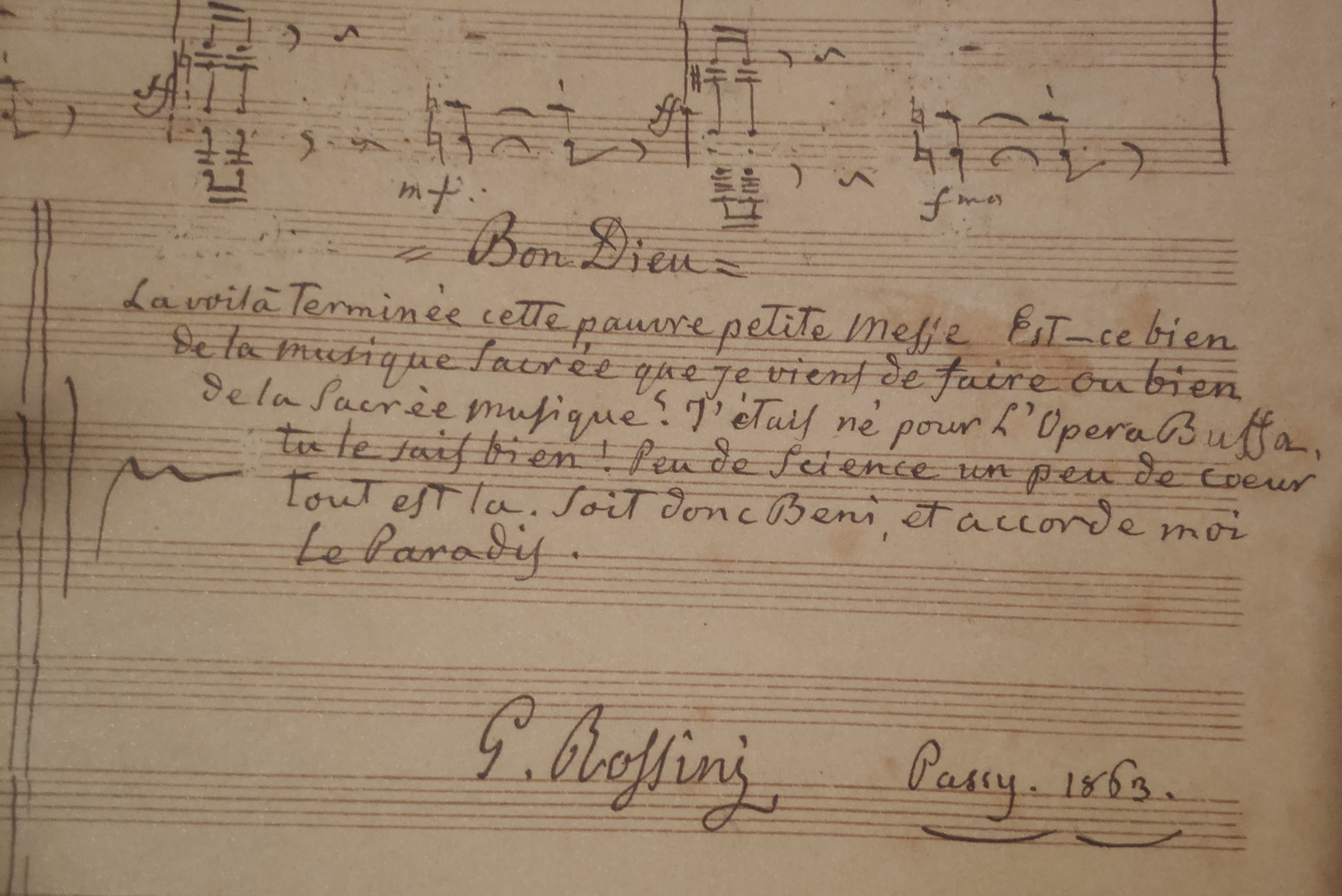
The composer's inscription at the end of the composition, «Bon Dieu. La voilà Terminée cette pauvre petite Messe. Est-ce bien de la musique Sacrée que je viens de faire ou de la Sacrée musique ? J'étais né pour L'Opera Buffa, tu le sais bien ! Peu de Science un peu de cœur, tout est là. Sois donc Béni et accorde moi Le Paradis. G. Rossini, Passy. 1863.»

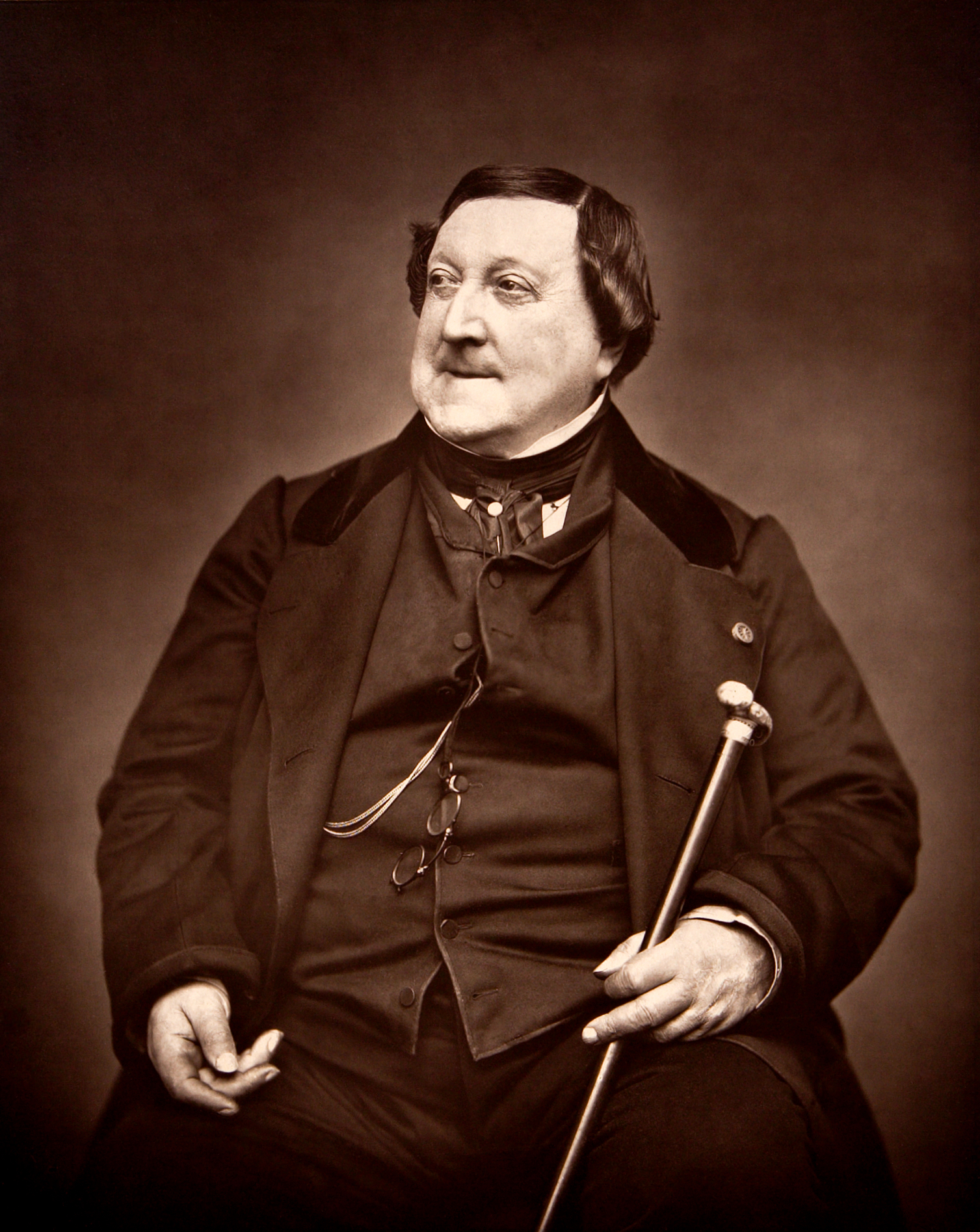
The composer in 1865

Rossini composed the Petite messe solennelle in 1863, 34 years after writing his last opera, in Passy, where he spent the last decades of his life. Rossini and his wife entertained a circle of friends, holding samedi soirs for which he composed several pieces of chamber music, often vocal, which the composer called his péchés de vieillesse (sins of old age). The mass was possibly commissioned by Count Alexis Pillet-Will for his wife Louise to whom it is dedicated, but the musicologist Nancy P. Fleming points out that Rossini may have had reasons of his own to compose it, and dedicated it in response to staging the first performance.

The mass is structured in several extended movements in the tradition of the missa solemnis, but the composer labeled it petite with a grain of irony. He wrote on the last page of the autograph manuscript (now preserved in the Fondazione Rossini, Pesaro):

Dear Lord, here it is finished, this poor little mass. Have I just written sacred music, or rather, sacrilegious music? I was born for opera buffa, as you well know. Not much technique, a little bit of heart, that's all. Blessings to you and grant me Paradise.

The unusual scoring for voices, two pianos and harmonium is in the Neapolitan harpsichord tradition of the 18th century. Rossini specified, on the second page of his manuscript, twelve singers in all, (Note: "Douze chanteurs de trois sexes, hommes, femmes et castrats seront suffisants pour son exécution; à savoir huit pour le choeur, quatre pour les solos, total douze chérubins.") noting on the title page: "Twelve singers of three sexes, men, women and castrati will suffice for its execution: that is, eight for the choir, four soloists, in all twelve cherubim". (Note: Castrati had not recently been heard on a French stage; only the choir of Pope Pius IX still featured castrati)

=== Performances ===
The mass was first performed on 14 March 1864 at the couple's new residence in Paris, the hôtel of Louise, comtesse de Pillet-Will. (Note: The eighteenth-century early Louis XV boiseries of the countess's salon are now installed at the Metropolitan Museum of Art.) The countess is the dedicatee of this refined and elegant piece. Albert Lavignac, aged eighteen, conducted from the harmonium. The soloists were the sisters Carlotta and Barbara Marchisio, Italo Gardoni and Luigi Agnesi. The sisters Marchisio had performed together in Rossini's works before, such as the leading parts of the lovers in his opera Semiramide. Rossini, who had helped prepare for the performance, turned pages for the first pianist, Georges Mathias, and marked tempos by nodding his head. Among the first listeners were Giacomo Meyerbeer, Daniel Auber and Ambroise Thomas. The performance was repeated the following day, for a larger audience which included members of the press.

In 1867, three years after the first performance, Rossini discreetly orchestrated the Petite messe solennelle, partly for fear that others would do it anyway after his death. As he disliked the sound of cathedral boys' choirs, he requested permission from the pope to perform the work with female voices at a church. When his request was rejected, he demanded that the orchestral version would only be performed after his death. The composer preferred the chamber music version anyway.

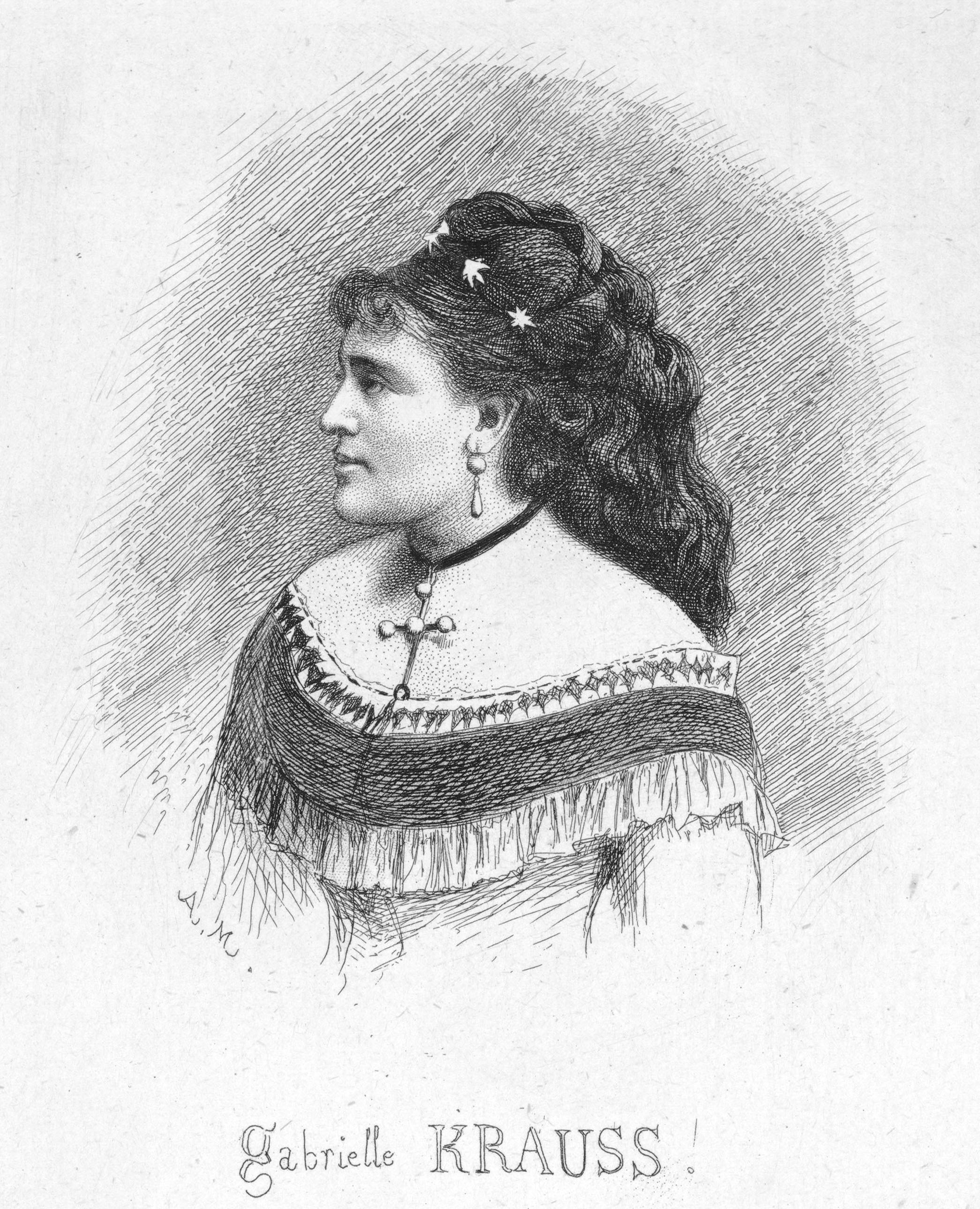
Gabrielle Krauss, the soprano in the first public performance

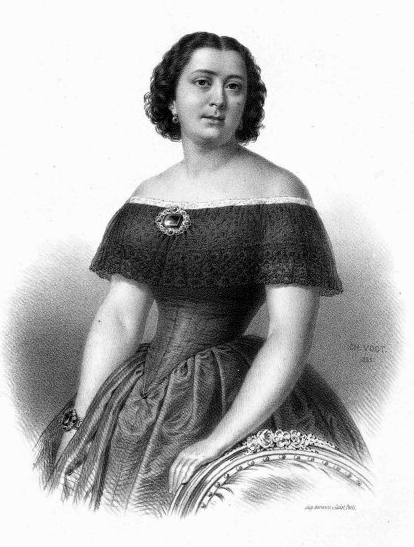
Marietta Alboni, the contralto

The first public performance of the work took place on 24 February 1869, close to what would have been Rossini's seventy-seventh birthday. (Note: Rossini was born on 29 February 1792 (a leap year).) It was performed at the Salle Ventadour in Paris by the Théâtre-Italien, with soloists Gabrielle Krauss, Marietta Alboni, Ernest Nicolas and Luigi Agnesi.

=== Publication ===
In 1869, both the piano version and the orchestral version were published. The first edition was a piano version by the Brandis & Dufour who made it available on the day of the premiere, based on Rossini's piano version but reduced to only one piano, also cutting passages. It was soon followed by editions from Chappell in London, Ricordi in Milan, and Oliver Ditson in Boston, somewhat later by B. Schotts Söhne. These four prints have in common that they were settings for harmonium and only one piano. Ricordi published a piano reduction of the orchestral score rather than following Rossini's original piano version. Some versions failed to mention that Rossini intended the work to be accompanied by two pianos.

A critical edition did not appear until 1980, when the Edizioni musicali Otos in Florence published a version faithful to the composer's intentions, edited by Angelo Coan. Three new editions of the piano version were prepared celebrating Rossini's 200th anniversary in 1992: two critical editions by Oxford and Carus-Verlag, and one by Novello, with only one piano part.

=== Reception ===
The work was well received by contemporary critics. Writing for La Perseveranza, Filippo Filippi said that "this time, Rossini has outdone himself, because no one can say what prevails, science and inspiration. The fugue is worthy of Bach for erudition." A reviewer for L'Illustration wrote:

One could sense, from the first measures, the powerful spirit which animated this artist thirty years ago at the time when he chose to put a stop at his glorious career at its culminating point. The composer of William Tell stands proudly before you in his eminence, and you realize with astonishment that neither time nor inactivity have caused any loss of the intelligence with which he is so marvelously endowed. The same facility of invention, the same melodic abundance, the same nobility of style and the same elegance, the same novel twists, the same richness of harmony, the same audacity and happy choice of modulation, the same vigor of conception and of expression, the same ease of part-writing and disposition of the voices, the same masterful and authoritative skill in the overall scheme of the work, as well as in the structure of each movement ...

Giuseppe Verdi was less enthusiastic, writing to Count Opprandino Arrivabene on 3 April 1864 that "lately Rossini has made progress and studied! Studied what? Personally, I would advise him to unlearn the music and write another Barber".

== Scoring ==
In its original version, the performance of the mass required four soloists (soprano, contralto, tenor and bass), a mixed choir of ideally twelve singers including the soloists, two pianos and harmonium, which could sometimes be replaced by an accordion, according to Rossini's initial ideas, but was considered too "popular" for a religious framework at the time of the mass's creation. This small number of performers contrasts with the dimension of ensembles used at that time to interpret the great works of sacred music. This is what has earned this mass the adjective petite. In 1867 Rossini orchestrated his mass for instrumental forces much larger: three flutes, two oboes, two clarinets, three bassoons, four horns, four trumpets, three trombones, ophicleide, two cornets, timpani, two harps, organ and strings.

Judgements about the two versions diverge. Some musicologists argue that the orchestrated version is preferred today to the original while others explain that the piano gives back its "bite" to the original version, which the composer preferred.

== Structure ==
The mass is structured following the five parts of the liturgical text, with a ternary Kyrie, a Gloria in six movements, a Credo divided in four sections, Sanctus (including Hosanna and Benedictus) and Agnus Dei. Rossini added two earlier compositions, using an instrumental piece in the form of prelude and fugue for an offertory, and inserting in the orchestral version a soprano aria, a setting of "O salutaris hostia". As Fleming points out, insertion of an instrumental offertory and/or a motet such as "O salutaris hostia" was mentioned in La France musicale in reviews of contemporary mass settings. The Kyrie and Gloria form Part I, the other movements are combined as Part II.

In the following table of the movements, the markings, keys and time signatures are taken from the Ricordi choral score, using the symbol for common time (4/4). The table reflects the original scoring but includes the added movement "O Salutaris". In movements without notes, both piano(s) and harmonium accompany the voices.

Part	No.	Incipit	Marking	Voices	Key	Time	Notes
Part I
Kyrie	1	Kyrie eleison	Andante maestoso	SATB	A minor – C major	common time	
Kyrie	1	Christe eleison	Andantino moderato	SATB	C minor	4/2	a cappella
Kyrie	1	Kyrie eleison	Andante maestoso	SATB	C minor – A major	common time	
Gloria	2	Gloria in excelsis Deo	Allegro maestoso	SATB	F major	common time	
Gloria	2	Et in terra pax	Andantino mosso	S A T B SATB	F major	2/4	
Gloria	3	Gratias agimus tibi	Andante grazioso	A T B	A major	2/4	
Gloria	4	Domine Deus	Allegro giusto	T	D major	common time	
Gloria	5	Qui tollis peccata mundi	Andantino mosso	S A	F minor	common time	
Gloria	6	Quoniam tu solus sanctus	Adagio · Allegro moderato	B	A major	common time	
Gloria	7	Cum Sancto Spiritu	Allegro a capella	SATB	F major	common time	
Part II
Credo	8	Credo in unum Deum	Allegro Cristiano	S A T B SATB	E major	common time	
Credo	9	Crucifixus	Andantino sostenuto	S	A♭ major	common time	
Credo	10	Et resurrexit	Allegro	S A T B SATB	E major	common time	
Preludio religioso	11		Andante maestoso		F♯ minor	common time	piano
Preludio religioso	11		Andantino mosso		F♯ minor	3/4	piano or harmonium
Ritornello			Andante		C major	6/8	harmonium
Sanctus	12		Andantino mosso	S A T B SATB	C major	6/8	a cappella
O Salutaris	13	O salutaris hostia	Andante	S	G major	common time	
Agnus Dei	14		Andante sostenuto	A SATB	E minor	3/4	

== Music ==
Fleming compares the mass to Rossini's operas and early mass settings and finds restrained vocal lines, even in the melismas of the Agnus Dei, but observes his "predilection for spicy harmonic twists". She summarizes his "optimistic and deeply felt faith". Robert King, the conductor of The King's Consort, notes: "It certainly is solennelle, for it is a heartfelt religious work which shows the extraordinary compositional capabilities of this astonishing man of the theatre: it is full of drama, pathos, colour and intensity."

=== Kyrie ===
The structure of the Kyrie, following the liturgical three appellations, "Kyrie eleison. Christe eleison. Kyrie eleison" (Lord, have mercy. Christ, ...), is ternary, in the form A–B–A'.

- "Kyrie eleison" Andante maestoso ( = 108) A minor (measures 1–35)
- "Christe eleison" Andantino moderato ( = 66) in C minor (measures 36–57)
- "Kyrie eleison" as a reprise of the first part, but in other keys (measures 58–90)

The work opens in A minor, with two chords marked pppp, extremely soft. The piano then begins an ostinato motif which remains present throughout the rest of the A sections of the movement. A continuous flow of sixteenth notes appears in a pattern of the first sixteenth note in each beat played in octaves by the left hand (often including the third and fourth sixteenth notes, especially at the start), while the remaining sixteenth notes appear as chords in the right hand (often syncopated). (Note: An effect repeated by Johannes Brahms in his Rhapsody in G minor op. 79, composed 16 years later.) The harmonium introduces motifs repeated by the chorus. The voices pick up a slowly rising line on the word "Kyrie", marked sotto voce, in imitation: first tenor and bass, a measure later alto, a measure later soprano. The word "eleison" appears in contrasting homophonic chords marked forte, but smorzando to piano for the repeats of the word. A second appellation begins in measure 18 in C major, marked pppp for "Kyrie" but with another sudden forte and decrescendo for "eleison".

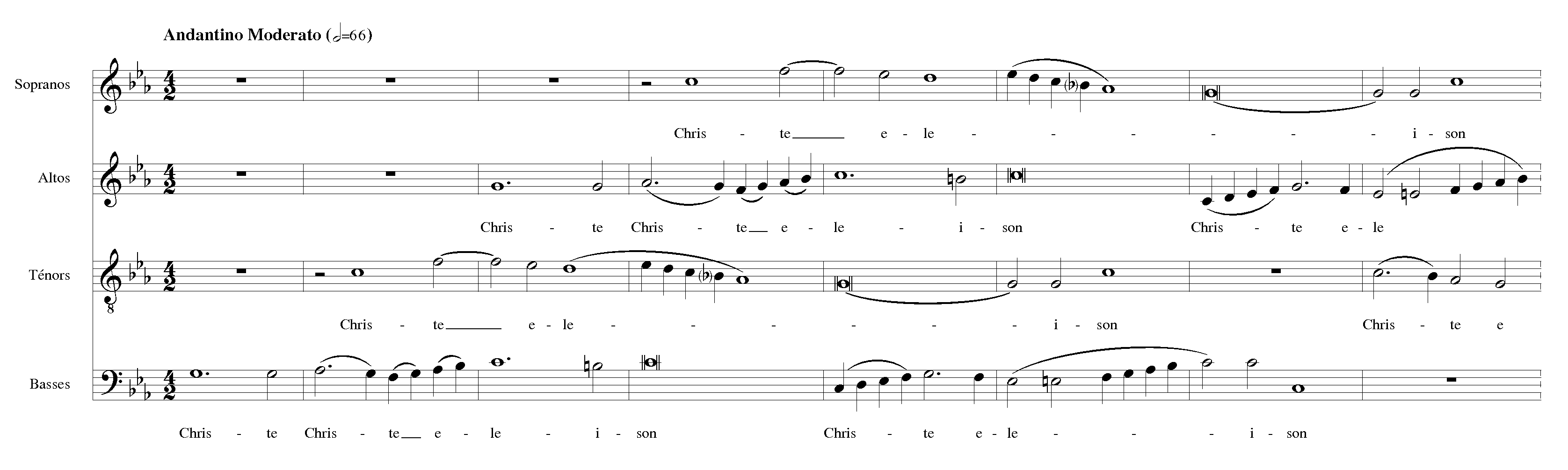
Beginning of the a cappella "Christe eleison"

The middle section, "Christe eleison", is a double canon in an archaizing style. Marked "tutto sotto voce e legato" it stays on one dynamic level, different from the dynamic contrasts of the first part. This music was composed by Rossini's friend Louis Niedermeyer as the "Et incarnatus" of a solemn mass, and included by Rossini "possibly as an affectionate personal tribute", as the musicologist David Hurwitz points out.

The second "Kyrie" returns to the initial tempo and musical themes, but has a tonally inverted path: C minor instead of A minor, then A major instead of C major. After the second exposition, the finale runs through a chain of surprising harmonies (measures 75 to 80) leading to the final cadence.

=== Gloria ===
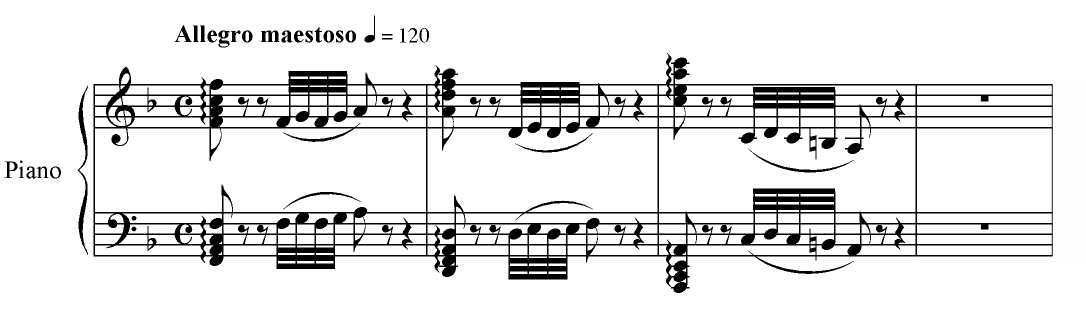
Beginning of the Gloria

The Gloria is subdivided into six movements (seven sections), similar to Baroque masses such as Bach's short masses.

==== Gloria in excelsis Deo ====
Marked Allegro maestoso ( = 120), the first line is introduced by two sequences of three chordal motifs, separated by a measure of silence. According to Claire Delamarche, these represent the trois coups announcing the rise of the curtain in the French theater tradition. The sopranos alone sing the first line, "Glory to God in the Highest", repeated by a four-part harmonization.

==== Et in terra pax ====
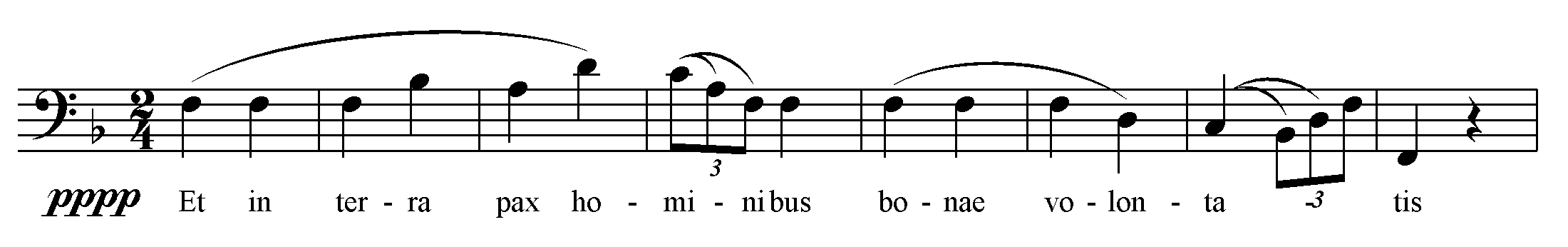
Bass solo

After six measures of piano interlude, the bass soloist begins softly the text "And peace on earth", joined later by the other soloists. Finally the four parts of the chorus all repeat one after the other gently "adoramus te" (we pray to you) and conclude the section singing in homophony "glorificamus te" (we glorify you), marked again sotto voce.

==== Gratias ====
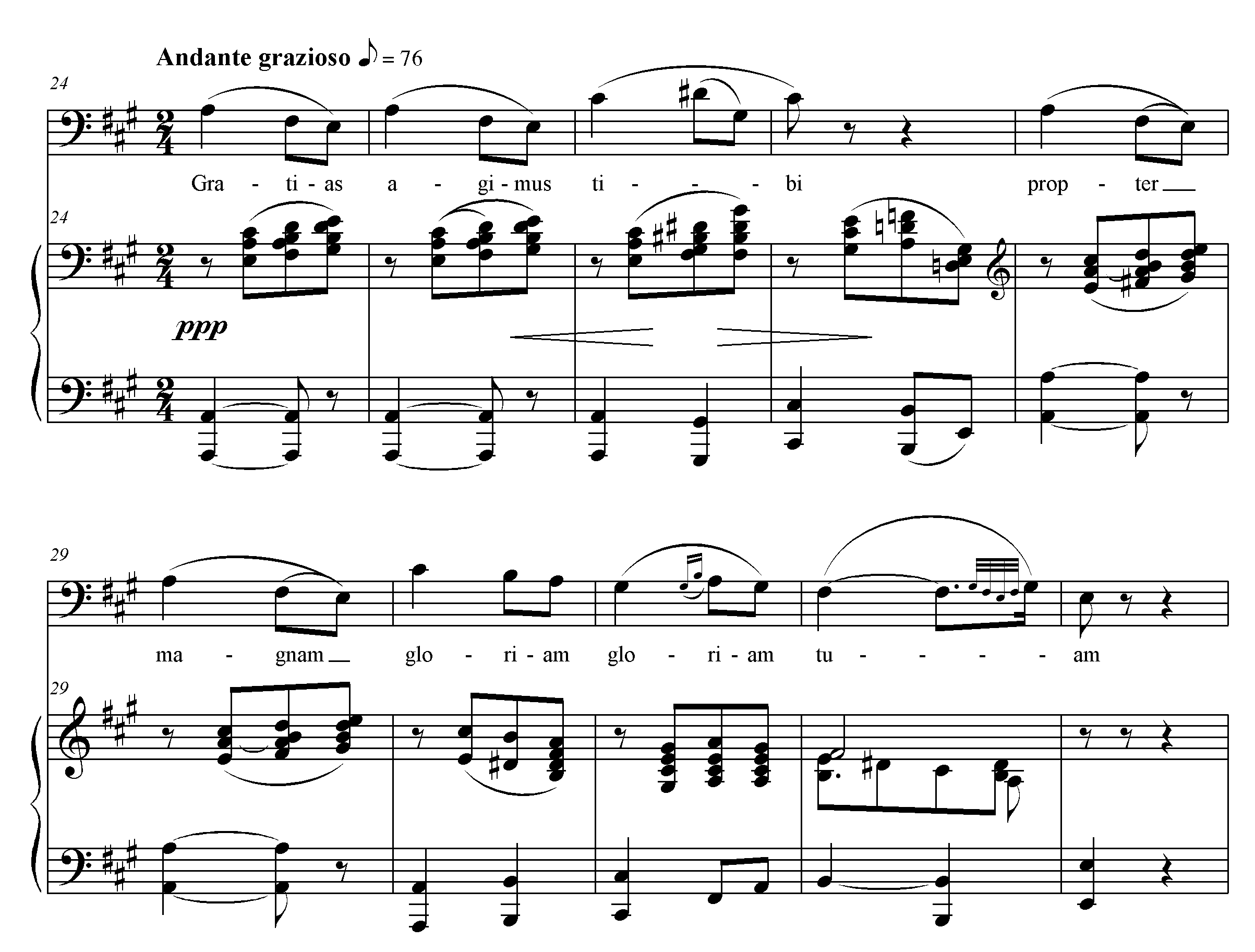
Theme of the bass with piano

The second movement of the Gloria is a trio for alto, tenor, and bass. It sets the "Gratias agimus tibi propter magnam gloriam tuam" (We give you thanks for your great glory). Marked Andante grazioso ( = 76) in 2/4, it is made up of:

- an introduction for piano
- theme A, used in different voices (measures 24–51)
- presentation of a new theme, B (measures 51–58)
- a chromatic digression for piano (measures 59–65)
- a brief return to theme A (measures 67–76)
- development of theme B (measures 76–94)
- a long plagal cadence (measures 96–114)

The setting for three voices illustrates "We give you thanks".

Domine Deus
Enrico Caruso

==== Domine Deus ====
The third movement of the Gloria is a tenor aria, setting "Domine Deus rex celestis" (Lord God, King of Heaven). Marked Allegro giusto and fortissimo ( = 120) in common time, it is introduced by a march-like theme with a pattern of a syncopated long accented note on beat 2 of most measures, which the tenor picks up. The second thought, "Domine Deus Agnus Dei" (Lord God, Lamb of God) is presented in contrasting triple-piano and even rhythm. A third aspect, "Domine Deus Filius Patris" (Lord God, Son of the Father), appear forte and with an even accompaniment in triplets. The aria is, by its music of energetic syncopes, dotted rhythms and leaps, an image of a majestic heavenly king.

==== Qui tollis ====
The fourth movement of the Gloria is a duet for the two female soloists, expressing "Qui tollis peccata mundi, miserere nobis" (You who carries the sins of the world, have mercy). Marked Andantino mosso ( = 76) in common time, it has the two voices often in parallels of thirds and sixths.

==== Quoniam ====
The fifth movement of the Gloria is a bass aria on the text "Quoniam tu solus sanctus" (For You alone are Holy). A short introduction, marked Adagio, leads to an extended piano section, marked Allegro moderato ( = 76) with contrasts in dynamics.

==== Cum Sancto Spiritu ====
The final movement of the Gloria is a chorus on the words "Cum Sancto Spiritu in Gloria Dei Patris." (With the Holy Spirit in the Glory of God.) Amen". They are presented first as in the beginning of the Gloria, returning to the initial key. Then, marked Allegro a capella, they are expanded to long fugue with a display of counterpoint. Shortly before the end, the opening of the Gloria is repeated on the first words, unifying the movement further.

=== Credo ===
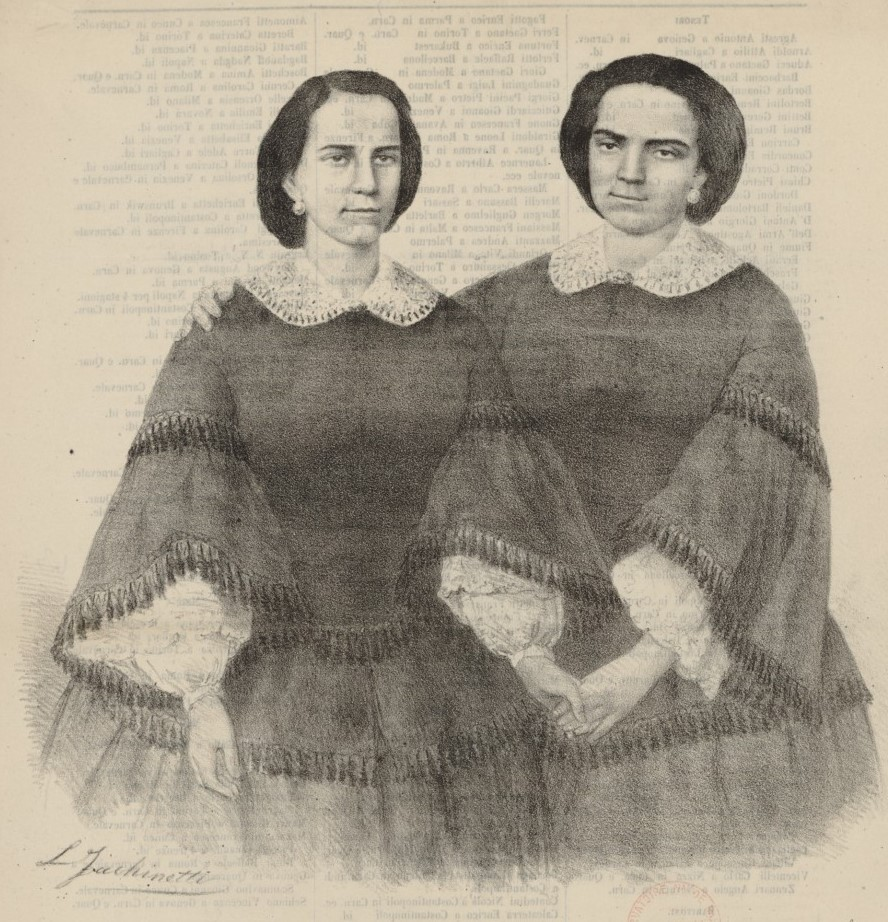
The sisters Carlotta and Barbara Marchisio, who often appeared together, including the first performance of the mass

Different from the Gloria, the text of the Creed is mostly in the same character, interrupted only for a short soprano solo "Crucifixus" (Crucified) and an episode "Et resurrexit" (And risen), concluded by another fugue. The word "Credo" (I believe) is first sung by the tenors, then by the sopranos, again by the choir. This statement of belief is repeated several times throughout the movement, structuring and unifying it, in a way that Niccolò Jommelli, Mozart and Beethoven used before, among others.

Marked Allegro Cristiano ( = 120), a strong beginning is contrasted by softly expressing "in unum Deum" (in one God), beginning on the same tone, reminiscent of liturgical reciting tone. Then the soloists, with alto and tenor beginning, sing the passage "Et incarnatus est" (And was born) in the same mood. The female voices of the chorus announce in unison: "Et homo factus est" (and was made man), repeated by the male voices, then the piano plays a sequence of short motifs, interrupted by many rests.

Crucifixus
Enrico Caruso

==== Crucifixus ====
The crucifixion is illustrated by the solo soprano, marked Andantino sostenuto ( = 80), on a soft ostinato accompaniment.

==== Et resurrexit ====
The resurrection is announced by the sopranos, first alone, then by a strong chord in the instruments which changes the E♭ they sing to D♯ of a B major chord, in which the other voices join. After this surprise, the new text is sung to themes from the first section, concluded by "Credo". Another fugue expands the text "Et vitam venturi saeculi. (And the life of a world to come.) Amen". It ends operatic, with a stretta, a slow retarding line by all soloists, finally a last "Credo".

=== Preludio religioso ===
For the liturgical offertory, Rossini inserted an instrumental piece he had composed before, a combination of prelude and fugue. The prelude, sixteen measures of 4/4 Andante maestoso ( = 92), is written for piano and asks for dynamics ranging from double forte to double piano una corda. It announces at the same time the F♯ tonality, and the modulating character of the movement, by chords borrowed from distant keys. The solemn rhythmic style (.) will not recur until the four-measure postlude of the fugue.

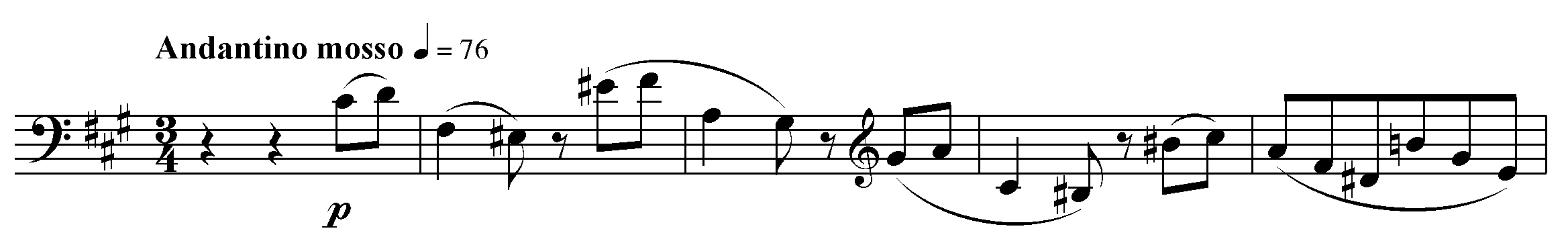
Fugue subject, (17–21)

Rossini indicates that the fugue (without the postlude explicitly written for piano) may be played equally on piano or harmonium. In 3/4, Andantino mosso ( = 76) with a regular rhythm of eighth notes, the fugue has a theme in the form of a turn like the BACH motif, which has the same chromatic opening as the famous subject of the Fantasy and Fugue on the Theme B-A-C-H by Franz Liszt. Rossini proves both his inventiveness (particularly at the level of management of the tonality, which frequently evolves into distant keys) and his impressive capacity for mastering the contradictions.

The structure begins classically with a fugue with the exposition of the subject successively in the three voices at a piano dynamic. The turn motif in F♯ minor is repeated four times at the interval of a rising third (C♯, E♯, G♯, and B♯), followed by a development by a sequence of arpeggios in descending thirds. The melodic line proceeds to the dominant to accompany the exposition of the subject in the second voice, with a series of eighth notes arranged in a constant interval of a third or a sixth with the subject. This arrangement repeats itself during the exposition of the subject in the third voice in F♯ minor.

A long episode of 29 measures follows, where the modulations are legion. For example, a sequence based on the three first notes of the turn theme is repeated eight times in a row starting in measure 47. Numerous dynamics are marked in the score: piano, forte, crescendo and decrescendo. This episode ends with the dynamic double forte decrescendo on a perfect cadence of G♯ (D♯ dominant seventh → G♯ major), repeated twice identically. The G♯ major chord becomes the dominant of the key of the second exposition. The second exposition begins at measure 70 in the left hand, in C♯ minor, then in the right hand in G♯ minor at measure 78. The same 29 episodic measures as before are heard, but transposed, then extended by 26 measures of new development, always using numerous sequences.

A full measure of rest (measure 140) precedes a cadence in F♯ minor, then F♯ major, of which the A♯ transforms into the tonic of the key B♭ minor for the postlude, then the dominant of the cadence in E♭ minor, followed by an E♭ major chord, and concluding without transition on an F♯ major chord.

=== Ritornello ===
Rossini wrote a brief instrumental passage, probably to establish the key of C major and the mood for the following Sanctus. The "Ritornello" and the "Sanctus" which follows are in effect in the same key of C major (both in 6/8).

=== Sanctus ===
The acclamation "Sanctus" (Holy) appears three times, sung by the choir, each time more intense than before. "Pleni sunt coeli et terra" (Full are heaven and earth) begins as a canon of the choir voices, beginning forte and ending softly. "Hosanna in excelsis" (Hosanna in the Highest) is sung by pairs of soloists in unison. For "Benedictus qui venit in nomine Domine" (Blessed who comes in the name of the Lord), the choir presents a soft melody in triplets. The sequence is repeated in different harmonic development and with the soloists taking over the "Benedictus" section. The movement culminates in a strong eight-part affirmation of "in excelsis".

=== O Salutaris ===
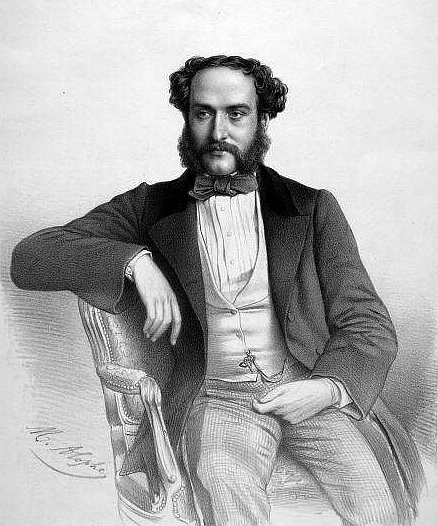
Georges Mathias, the principal pianist of the first performance, portrayed by Marie-Alexandre Alophe

This movement was not part of Rossini's original version for two pianos and harmonium, but he inserted it in his version for orchestra. He transposed an earlier composition, which was originally in E major for alto, however as the alto soloist had to subsequently sing the Agnus Dei, it was reallocated to the soprano. It became customary to include it even in performances and editions with piano(s).

Thomas Aquinas's hymn "O salutaris hostia" has been used in mass settings close to the Agnus Dei from the Renaissance. It was set to music in the 18th century by Guillaume-Gabriel Nivers, Henry Madin, and Jean-Paul-Égide Martini, and by Franz Liszt in the 19th century. Rossini uses the first four lines (out of eight). The melodic line of the soprano soloist begins with an upward broken seventh chord.

This movement in 3/4, with tempo Andantino sostenuto ( = 88), is structured as:

- an introduction for piano of twenty measures
- an A–B–A section (measures 21 to 91)
- a reprise of the introduction, shared between the piano and the soloist (measures 92 to 103)
- an A'–B'–A' section (measures 104 to 154)
- a finale with piano in a noble style, as similarly throughout the work

The theme and its broken seventh chord (G-B-D-F♯) which characterize this movement is stated first as a major seventh in the two first passages of the first section A with a discreet accompaniment. To finish this section, the theme arpeggiates a dominant seventh. In the second A section, the theme first repeats the major seventh before developing into a minor seventh with a minor third in the second passage (G-B♭-D-F♮).

The melodic line of part B is contrasting in both its static character and the vehemence of the piano accompaniment, and by the double forte dynamics, as much by the double forte dynamics which give a brutal character, as by the use of sequences (E♭ major to begin with, then B major, G major, E♭ major, etc.). This section ends with a chromatic descent in the accompaniment at quadruple piano dynamic, up to a dominant seventh of G major, to prepare the return of the second section A in the original key.

A reprise of the first measures of the introduction uses only the text "Bella premunt" ("The armies pursue us"). While the piano repeats the introduction identically, the soprano doubles it several times for one or two measures interspersed with silences.

The rest (section A') is largely in the form of sequences. Section B' uses the most static part of theme B in another sequence. The return to the key of section A', repeated identically, operates on an enharmonic equivalence (G♭→F♯) as elsewhere in the work.

=== Agnus Dei ===
The final movement of the mass begins with an introduction that is similar to that to the "Crucifixus". The piano then begins another ostinato pattern as the base for expressive melodies by the contralto soloist, repeating many times "Agnus Dei, qui tollis peccata mundi, miserere nobis" (Lamb of God, you take away the sins of the world, have mercy). After an extended cadence the choir sings a capella, twice and very simply: "Dona nobis pacem" (Give us peace). This process is repeated in different harmony, and once more in a major mode, leading to an intense request for peace of the soloist and the choir together. Then the movement returns to the introduction, with its soft chords interrupted by rests, and ends with a few strong hammered chords.

== Sources ==
General sources

- Messe solennelle (Second edition piano-vocal score). Ricordi & Co. 1968.

Books

- Colas, Damien (1995). Petite Messe solennelle. Philips Records.
- Delamarche, Claire [in French] (1993). "Gioacchino Rossini". In Tranchefort, François-René; Mendel, Arthur (eds.). Guide de la musique sacrée et chorale profane de 1750 à nos jours. Fayard. pp. 884–894. ISBN 978-2213022543.
- Hurwitz, David (2010). Petite Messe solennelle (Works of Gioachino Rossini, Vol. 3) (PDF). classicstoday.com.

Journals

- Fleming, Nancy P. (1990). "Rossini's Petite Messe Solennelle". The Choral Journal. 30 (7). American Choral Directors Association: 15–21. JSTOR 23547584.
- Rosenberg, Jesse (1994). "Petite Messe solennelle de Gioachino Rossini". Notes. Second Series. 51 (1). Music Library Association: 413–418. doi:10.2307/899275. JSTOR 899275.
- Schenbeck, Lawrence (1995). "Petite Messe solennelle de Gioachino Rossini". The Choral Journal. 35 (7). American Choral Directors Association: 60–61. JSTOR 23549921.

Newspapers

- Wolff, Albert (1869). "Gazette de Paris". Le Figaro.

Online sources

- Casaglia, Gherardo (2005). "24 February 1869". L'Almanacco di Gherardo Casaglia (in Italian).
- Casaglia, Gherardo (2005). "Marchisio". L'Almanacco di Gherardo Casaglia (in Italian).
- Garnier, Séverine (17 July 2015). "Aedes et la sacrée musique de Rossini". classiquemaispashasbeen.fr (in French).
- King, Robert (2006). "Gioacchino Rossini (1792–1868) / Petite Messe solennelle". Hyperion Records.
- Quinn, John (2013). "Gioachino Rossini (1792–1868) / Petite Messe Solenelle (1863, orch, 1867)". musicweb-international.com.
- "Gioachino Rossini, Petite messe solennelle" (performance notes). Stavros Niarchos Foundation Cultural Center. April 2017.
