= Alexis Pillet-Will =

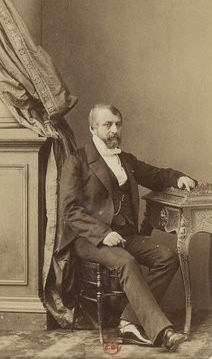
- Born: Hyacinthe Louis Alexis Constantin Pillet-Will; 1805; Lausanne
- Died: 9 April 1871 (aged 65–66); Brussels
- Occupation: Banker

Alexis Pillet-Will, full name Hyacinthe-Louis-Alexis-Constantin Pillet-Will, (1805 – 9 April 1871) was a 19th-century French banker.

== Career ==
The son of Michel-Frédéric Pillet-Will, cofounder and vice-president of the Caisse d’épargne de Paris in 1858 and regent of the Banque de France (13th siege), knighted by the King of Sardinia in 1833, and Françoise-Élisabeth Will, a daughter of the banker Philippe-Louis Will, Alexis Pillet-Will was appointed administrator then director of the Caisse d'épargne in 1863 and regent of the Banque de France after his father.

In 1834, he married Louise Roulin (1802–1878) who held a salon and for whom Gioachino Rossini composed the Petite messe solennelle in 1863 at the suggestion of her husband Alexis.

Their son, Frédéric Pillet-Will, would in turn become director of the Caisse d'épargne de Paris in 1871 and regent of the Banque de France.

While Michel-Frédéric Pillet died leaving a legacy of 15 million francs . (11 million once removed interest income), Alexis raised them to 23 million eleven years later.
