= Carlotta Marchisio =

Italian opera singer (1835–1872)

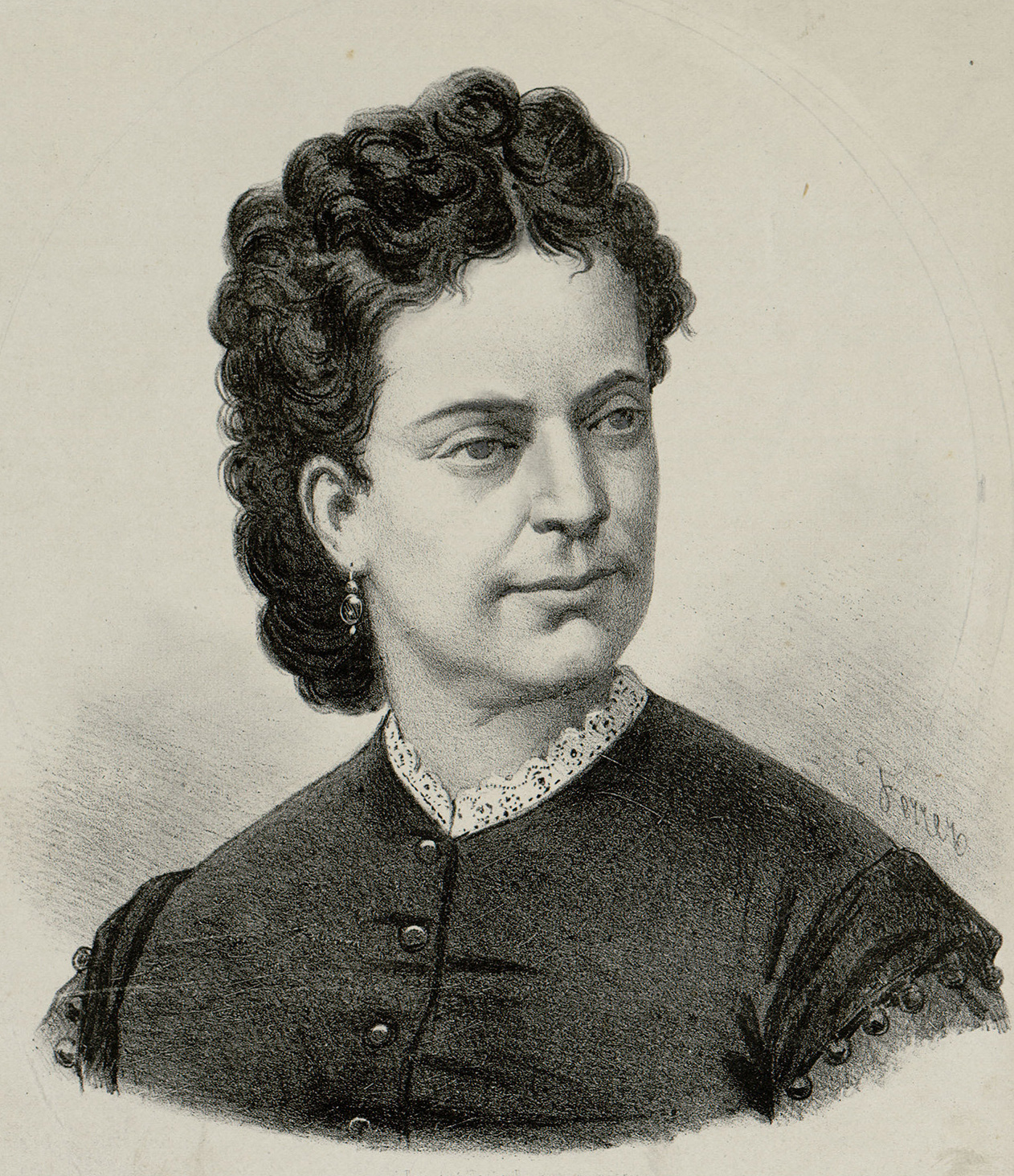
Portrait of Carlotta Marchisio by Giovanni Ferrero

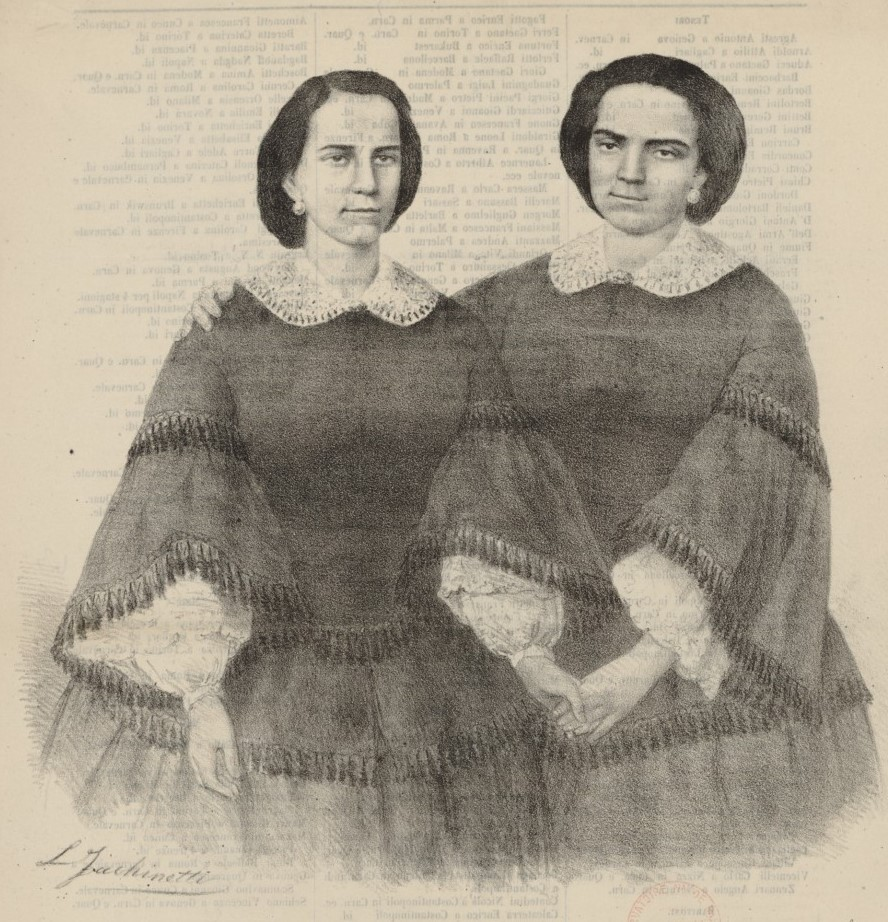
Portrait of Carlotta Marchisio (right) and her elder sister Barbara (left), published for their performances in Alessandria in 1858

Carlotta Marchisio (8 December 1835 – 28 June 1872) was an Italian operatic soprano and one of Rossini's favorite singers. Her voice was noted for its agility and beautiful timbre.

She was born in Turin into a family of musicians. Her elder sister, Barbara Marchisio was a noted contralto and their brother Antonino was a composer. Both Carlotta and Barbara Marchisio trained as singers in Turin with Carlotta Marchionni.

Carlotta made her debut as Adalgisa in Bellini's Norma at the Teatro Real in Madrid in March 1857. She frequently appeared with her sister Barbara, singing leading soprano and contralto roles in Paris (at the Théâtre-Italien) as well as in Brussels, Berlin, Moscow, Saint Petersburg, and various theatres in Great Britain. In 1861, she married the Austrian bass Eugen Kuhn, who performed under the name Eugenio Cosselli. She died in childbirth at the age of 36 in her native city.
