= Barbara Marchisio =

Italian opera singer (1833–1919)

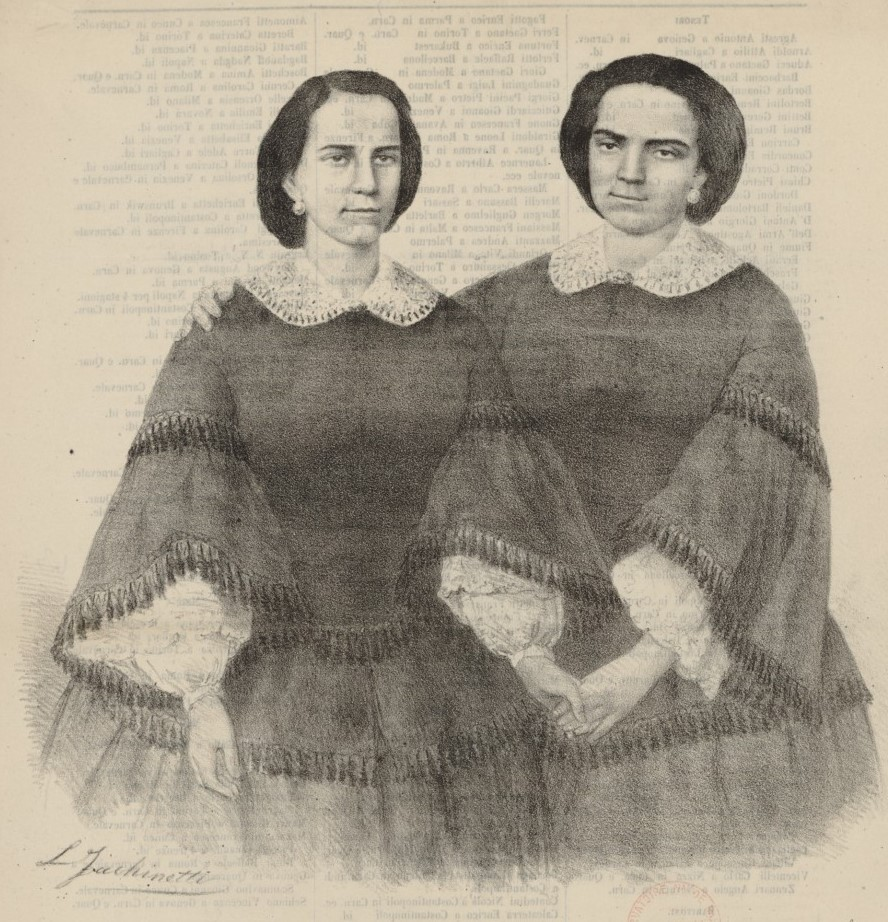
Portrait of Barbara Marchisio (left) and her younger sister Carlotta (right), published for their performances in Alessandria in 1858

Barbara Marchisio (6 December 1833 – 19 April 1919) was an Italian operatic contralto and one of Rossini's favorite singers. She was known for her excellent technique and a voice which possessed both agility and a very wide extension which allowed her to sing roles in the soprano range.

Marchisio was born into a family of musicians. Her younger sister Carlotta Marchisio was a noted soprano and their brother Antonino was a composer. Marchisio trained as a singer in Turin with Carlotta Marchionni, and made her stage debut as Adalgisa in Bellini's Norma in Vicenza in 1856. She frequently appeared together with her sister Carlotta, singing leading contralto and soprano roles in Paris (at the Théâtre-Italien) as well as in Brussels, Berlin, Moscow, Saint Petersburg, and various theatres in Great Britain. In her later years she was teacher at the Naples Conservatory and also taught privately. Amongst her pupils were Toti Dal Monte and Rosa Raisa.

== Life ==
Barbara Marchisio was born on 6 December 1833 in Turin, into a family of musicians. Her younger sister Carlotta Marchisio was a noted soprano and their brother Antonino was a composer. Their father was a piano maker in the city. Both Barbara and Carlotta Marchisio trained as singers in Turin with Carlotta Marchionni. Barbara made her stage debut as Adalgisa in Bellini's Norma in Vicenza in 1856. After her sister's debut in 1857, they frequently appeared together, singing leading contralto and soprano roles in Paris (at the Théâtre-Italien) as well as in Brussels, Berlin, Moscow, Saint Petersburg, and various theatres in England, Ireland and Scotland. Marchisio was one of Rossini's favorite singers. She was known for her excellent technique and a voice which possessed both agility and a very wide vocal range which allowed her to sing roles in the soprano range.

In her later years she became a singing teacher at the Naples Conservatory and also taught privately. Amongst her pupils were Toti Dal Monte and Rosa Raisa. She died in Mira, a small town on the outskirts of Venice, on 19 April 1919, at the age of 85.
