= Luigi Agnesi =

Belgian operatic bass-baritone, conductor and composer

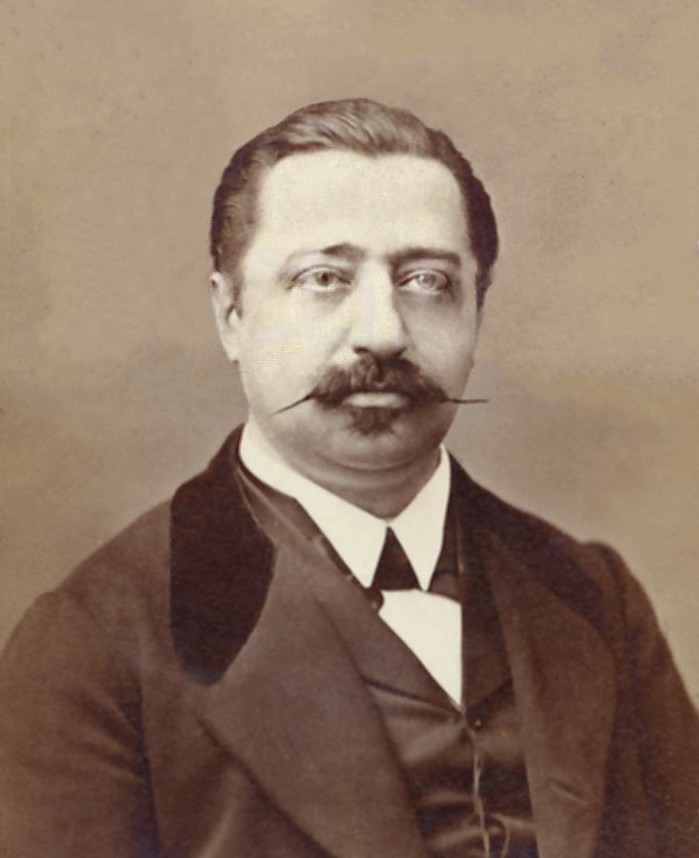
- Born: Loedwyck Ferdinand Léopold Agniez; July 17, 1833; Namur, Belgium
- Died: February 2, 1875 (aged 41); London, England
- Education: Royal Conservatory of Brussels
- Occupations: Operatic bass-baritone, conductor, composer
- Years active: 1858–1875
- Awards: Belgian Prix de Rome (1853)

Luigi Agnesi (17 July 1833 – 2 February 1875) was a Belgian operatic bass-baritone, conductor and composer.

== Life and career ==
Loedwyck "Louis" Ferdinand Léopold Agniez was born on 17 July 1833 in Erpent, Namur, Belgium. He studied with Charles-Marie-François Bosselet (harmony and music theory) and François-Joseph Fétis (music composition) among other teachers at the Royal Conservatory of Brussels. He graduated in 1853. While a student at the conservatory he worked as a voice teacher. At the age of 19 he married one of his singing pupils, Joanna Augustina Julia Scribe, and adopted part of her name for a pseudonym he composed under, L. F. Agniez- Scribe.

In 1853 Agniez won the Belgian Prix de Rome which enabled him to pursue further studies in Italy from 1853 to 1855. Returning to Brussels, he concurrently worked as music educator, composer, and as maître de chapelle at the Church of St. Catherine, Brussels in the 1850s. His only opera composition, Hermold le Normand, premiered at La Monnaie on 16 March 1858. The piece was poorly received and from this point he reoriented his career away from music composition and towards work as a singer. He initially performed on the concert stage in Belgium in 1859 and on tour to The Crystal Palace in London in 1860.

In 1861 Agnes went to France to study under tenor Gilbert Duprez, formerly of the Conservatoire de Paris, who by that time had his own private singing school in Paris. He made his professional opera debut in the 1861-1862 season in Rigoletto. He then toured Germany and the Netherlands with Eugenio Merelli’s Italian opera company; performing the roles of Assur in Gioachino Rossini's Semiramide, Basilio in Rossini's The Barber of Seville, and Dandini in La Cenerentola among other parts. He sang Assur for his first appearance at the Théâtre-Italien in Paris in 1864.

In 1865 he made his London debut at Her Majesty's Theatre, and thereafter his career was mainly centered in that city. He was highly active at the Royal Opera House and the Theatre Royal, Drury Lane up until his death in 1875 at the age of 41. He was particularly admired in England as King Henry VIII in Gaetano Donizetti's Anna Bolena and Alfonso in Donizetti's Lucrezia Borgia.
