= Carlotta Marchionni =

Italian stage actress

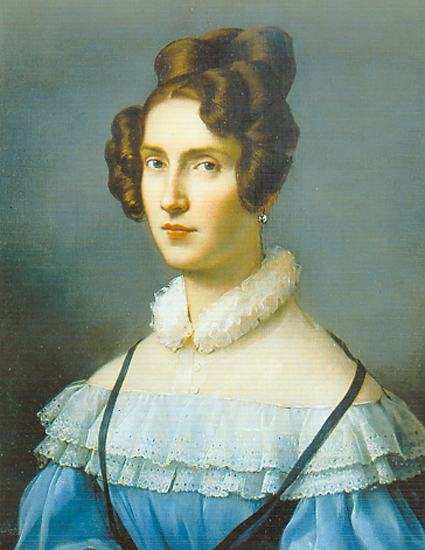
Giuseppe Bezzuoli Carlotta Marchionni

Carlotta Marchionni (1796–1864) was an Italian stage actress.

She was the leading lady and premier actress of the Royal Theatre of Sardinia between 1821 and 1840.

She was known for her interpretations of the tragedies by Vittorio Alfieri, Silvio Pellico and Carlo Marenco.
