= Revenge (1978 film) =

- Directed by: Sergiu Nicolaescu
- Starring: Gheorghe Dinică; Sergiu Nicolaescu
- Release date: 4 September 1978
- Running time: 101 minutes
- Country: Romania
- Language: Romanian

Revenge (Romanian: Revanșa) is a 1978 Romanian action film directed by Sergiu Nicolaescu.

== Cast ==
- Gheorghe Dinică - Paraipan
- Sergiu Nicolaescu - Tudor Moldovan
- Jean Constantin - Limba
- Amza Pellea - Pirvu
- Ion Besoiu - Zavoianu
- Mircea Albulescu - Geissler
- Silviu Stănculescu - Lt. Col. Riosianu
- Emanoil Petrut - Doctorul
- Ion Marinescu
- Colea Răutu - Grigore Maimuca
- Iurie Darie - Constantin David
- Alexandru Dobrescu
