= Accident (1976 film) =

1976 film

- Film poster
- Directed by: Sergiu Nicolaescu
- Written by: Dumitru Carabat
- Produced by: Dumitru Fernoaga
- Starring: Vladimir Găitan
- Cinematography: Alexandru David
- Edited by: Margareta Anescu
- Music by: Radu Goldis
- Release date: 1976
- Running time: 94 minutes
- Country: Romania
- Language: Romanian

Accident is a 1976 Romanian thriller film directed by Sergiu Nicolaescu.

== Cast ==
In alphabetical order

- Vladimir Găitan
- Emil Hossu
- Dan Ivănesei
- Ernest Maftei
- Ștefan Mihăilescu-Brăila
- George Mihăiță
- Sergiu Nicolaescu
- Amza Pellea
- Ileana Popovici
- Colea Răutu
- Virginia Rogin
- Leni Dacian
- Cezara Dafinescu
