= The Last Assault =

1985 film

- Directed by: Sergiu Nicolaescu
- Written by: Titus Popovici
- Starring: George Alexandru
- Release date: 1985
- Running time: 156 minutes
- Country: Romania
- Language: Romanian

The Last Assault (Romanian: Noi, cei din linia întâi; English: We, on the Front Lines) is a 1986 Romanian drama film directed by Sergiu Nicolaescu. It is set during World War II, during the period when Romania joined the Allies against the Axis.

== Plot ==
Horia Lazăr (Alexandru) is an eager but inexperienced officer given a command of Romanian troops. His unit marches across Transylvania, Hungary, and Czechoslovakia, during which it suffers heavy casualties. Much of the second half of the film covers the Siege of Budapest, including German efforts to relieve it.

During the course of the war, Lazăr forms a relationship with Silvia (Onesa), the daughter of General Marinescu (played by Nicolaescu himself).

== Production ==
In lieu of working German tanks, T-34's with German markings and some modifications were used instead. Some of the filming took place at the Văcărești Monastery during March 1985. Damage was committed during the filming, the worst being a fracturing of a marble cross given by Constantine Mavrocordatos, one of the monastery's founders.

Sergiu Nicolaescu wrote in his memoir that The Last Assault was the most censored of the films he directed. The Leadership Council for Socialist Culture and Education forced the removal of a few key scenes: one involving violence committed by Hungarian soldiers; the removal of the Romanian Army from Budapest, on orders from Stalin, so that the Soviet Red Army would be the first to reach the Hungarian Parliament Building; and the drama involving General Gheorghe Avramescu, who was accused by the Soviets of treason and was later executed (his daughter committed suicide while in detention).

One scene involves a pianist found by Romanian troops within a bombed out home in Budapest; Nicolaescu claimed this as a reference to the story of Władysław Szpilman (who was actually in Warsaw), which was later dramatized in Roman Polanski's The Pianist.

== Reception ==
The film was successful upon release. Many commented that The Last Assault felt like an American film, which Nicolaescu took as a compliment. It was selected as the Romanian entry for the Best Foreign Language Film at the 59th Academy Awards, but was not accepted as a nominee.

== Cast ==
- George Alexandru as Lt. Horia Lazăr
- Anda Onesa as Silvia Marinescu
- Valentin Uritescu as Sgt. Saptefrati
- Ion Besoiu as Col. Câmpeanu
- Ștefan Iordache as Count colonel Hashkotty
- Sergiu Nicolaescu as General Marinescu
- Mircea Albulescu as Horia Lazăr's father
- Silviu Stănculescu as Soviet general
- Colea Răutu as Sgt. Pliushkin II
- Emil Hossu as soldier Munteanu, ex-political prisoner
- Vladimir Găitan as Soviet Lt. Igor Ivanich Bodnarenko
- Marian Culiniac as Cpl. Petre Mărgău, from Treznea
- Ion Siminie as German General Reinhardt, commander of an armored division
- Traian Costea as German Maj. Franz
- Vasile Muraru as soldier Petcu
- Stelian Stancu as Major Badiu, commander of the infantry regiment
- Eusebiu Ștefănescu as German tank commander
- Costel Băloiu as soldier Firu
- Bogdan Stanoevici as soldier Lică
- Geo Dobre as German Lt. Peter Ungwart
- Cristian Șofron as Romanian corporal

== See also ==
- List of submissions to the 59th Academy Awards for Best Foreign Language Film
- List of Romanian submissions for the Academy Award for Best Foreign Language Film
