= Răscoala =

1966 film

- Directed by: Mircea Mureșan
- Written by: Liviu Rebreanu; Petre Sălcudeanu
- Starring: Ilarion Ciobanu; Nicolae Secăreanu; Matei Alexandru; Emil Botta; Ion Besoiu
- Cinematography: Nicu Stan
- Release date: 1966
- Country: Romania
- Language: Romanian

Răscoala is a 1966 Romanian drama film directed by Mircea Mureșan based on a novel by Liviu Rebreanu about the Romanian peasant uprising of 1907. Mureșan won the prize for Best First Work at the 1966 Cannes Film Festival. It was the first Romanian film to be submitted to the Academy Award for Best Foreign Language Film. However, it failed to be nominated.

== Cast ==
- Matei Alexandru (as Serafim Mogoș)
- Ion Besoiu (as Grigore Iuga)
- Adriana Bogdan (as Nadina)
- Emil Botta (as Anton Nebunul)
- Ilarion Ciobanu (as Petre Petre)
- Constantin Codrescu (as Baloleanu)
- Gheorghe Cozorici (as teacher Dragoș)
- Ernest Maftei (as Stan Marin)
- Ștefan Mihăilescu-Brăila (as Lupu Chirițoiu)
- Draga Olteanu-Matei (as Nadina's friend)
- Amza Pellea (as the military commander)
- Valentin Plătăreanu
- Colea Răutu (as Cosma Butuc)
- Nicolae Secăreanu (as Miron Iuga)
- Sandu Sticlaru (as sergeant Boiangiu)
- Constantin Rauțchi (as Toader)

== See also ==
- List of submissions to the 39th Academy Awards for Best Foreign Language Film
- List of Romanian submissions for the Academy Award for Best Foreign Language Film
