= Carol I (disambiguation) =

Carol I or King Carol I, may refer to:

== People ==
- Carol I of Romania (1839–1914), king from 1881 to 1914

== Places ==
- King Carol I Bridge, a bridge across the Danube River in Romania
- Carol I Mosque, Constanța, Romania
- "Carol I" Central University Library, Bucharest, Romania; the 'Carol I Library' of the University of Bucharest, the university's central library

=== Universities, colleges and schools ===
- Universitatea Regele Carol I din Cernăuți (Romanian: King Carol I University of Chernivtsi), Chernivtsi, Ukraine; former name of Chernivtsi University, formerly in Cernăuți, Romania, now being Chernivtsi, Ukraine
- Carol I National Defence University, Bucharest, Romania
- Carol I National College, Craiova, Romania; a highschool

== Other uses ==
- Order of Carol I, a high ranking order of honours in Romania
- NMS Regele Carol I (Romanian: HMS King Carol I), Romanian warship from converted passenger ship
- Carol I (film), 2009 Romanian documentary film about King Carol I of Romania

== See also ==
- Carol I. Turner (born 1947), dentist-admiral of the U.S. Navy
- Carol (disambiguation)
