= Uncle Marin, the Billionaire =

1979 film

- Directed by: Sergiu Nicolaescu
- Written by: Eugen Barbu; Vintilä Corbul; Amza Pellea
- Starring: Amza Pellea; Draga Olteanu Matei; Jean Constantin; Ștefan Mihăilescu-Brăila
- Cinematography: Nicolae Girardi
- Release date: 5 February 1979
- Running time: 88 minutes
- Country: Romania
- Languages: Romanian; German; English

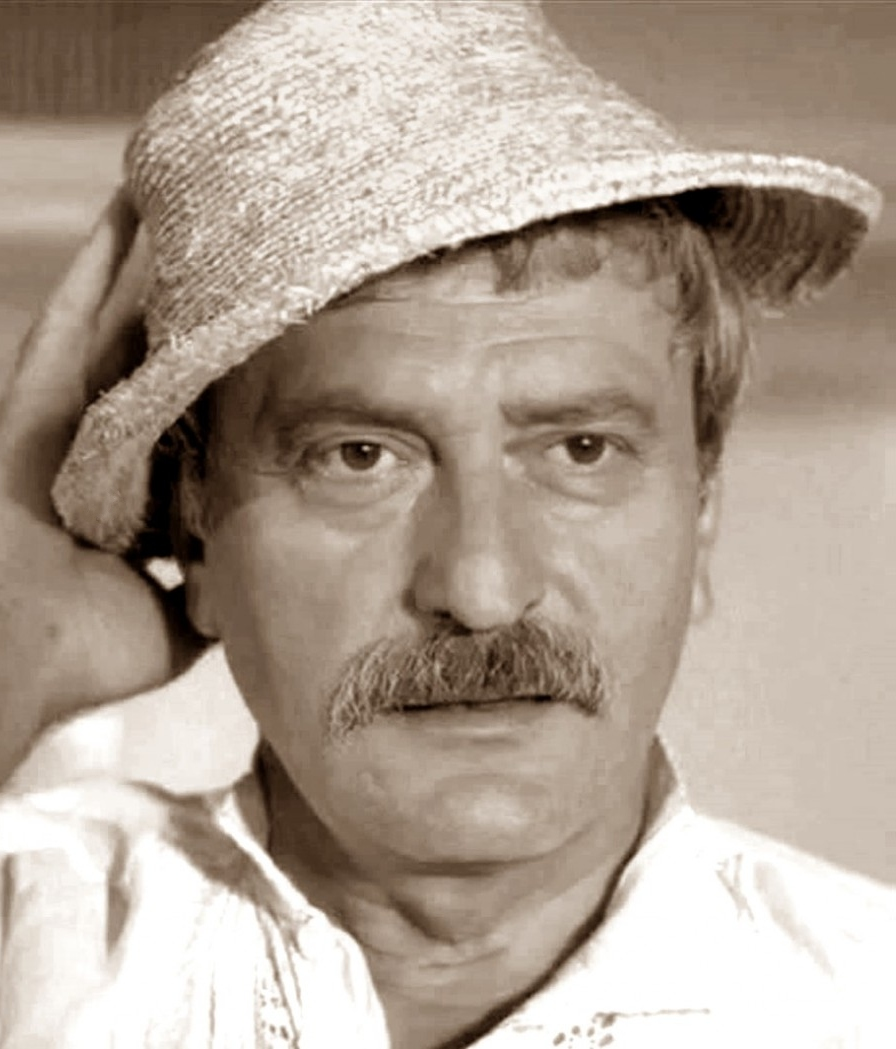
Amza Pellea

Uncle Marin, the Billionaire (Romanian: Nea Mărin miliardar) is a 1979 Romanian comedy film directed by Sergiu Nicolaescu after a script written by Vintilă Corbul, Eugen Burada, and Amza Pellea. The main roles are interpreted by Amza Pellea (in dual role), Draga Olteanu Matei, Jean Constantin, Ștefan Mihăilescu-Brăila, Sebastian Papaiani, Puiu Călinescu, Stela Popescu, and Colea Răutu.

Nea Mărin miliardar is ranked 1 in the top most viewed Romanian films of all time.

== Plot ==
In a pre-credit sequence two criminals hijack a plane and kidnap a young woman. After parachuting out of the plane with the woman, they pass her over to gangsters. The gangsters then murder the kidnappers.

At a swanky hotel in a Black Sea resort, Gogu, one of the hotel employees, meets his uncle Marin, an Oltenian peasant who has come to visit. Gogu says he can sneak Marin into the hotel, as one of the rooms is empty awaiting the arrival of an American billionaire, Mr. Juvett. Marin is amazed by the revealing clothing worn by women at the resort, while the hotel guests are fascinated by his quaint peasant costume. In the hotel room, Marin is perplexed by the various gadgets. Meanwhile, the gangsters learn that Juvett has arrived at the hotel. Juvett is the father of the kidnapped girl, and is coming to pass over a million dollar ransom. A rival gang, who know about the kidnapping, plan to take the ransom for themselves. They follow Marin, believing him to be Juvett.

When the real Juvett arrives, he is carrying a suitcase containing the ransom, which is identical to the one in which Marin carries his supply of leeks and cheese. He is also identical in appearance to Marin. The gangsters repeatedly mistake Marin for Juvett, while Juvett and Marin constantly exchange suitcases by mistake, leading to numerous farcical situations. Meanwhile, Juvett's daughter, Samantha, escapes from the kidnappers and tries to find her father. The two rival criminal gangs agree to team up, but in reality both plan to double-cross the other and take all the money.

At the hotel, a mysterious American guest with a remarkable resemblance to Lt. Columbo keeps an eye on things. Eventually Veta, Marin's battleaxe wife, arrives and helps her husband by belabouring the kidnappers, while Columbo takes control of the suitcase containing the ransom money. Veta and Marin are captured by the gangsters, but succeed in incapacitating them by drinking them under the table. Columbo arrests the two rival gangs, and Juvett and Samantha decide to stay in Romania a little longer and to visit Marin's home village of Băilești.

== Cast ==
- Amza Pellea as Nea Mărin Juvete / Mr. Juvett
- Draga Olteanu Matei as Veta
- Jean Constantin as Mob Boss #1
- Ștefan Mihăilescu-Brăila as Mob Boss #2
- Sebastian Papaiani as Gogu
- Brândușa Marioțeanu as Samantha Juvett
- Ștefan Bănică as Poe
- Puiu Călinescu as Detective Columbo
- Hamdi Cerchez as Moe
- Petre Lupu as Mitch
- Mihai Mălaimare as Sache
- Adina Popescu as hotel maid
- Stela Popescu as the spy
- Corneliu Gârbea as Peach
- Vasilica Tastaman as the shop assistant
- Mircea Albulescu as bandit #1
- Alexandru Dobrescu as bandit #2
- Gil Dobrică as the singer at the bar
