= List of Romanian submissions for the Academy Award for Best International Feature Film =

Best International Feature Film submissions from Romania

Highlights
- Debut: 1966
- Submissions: 42
- Nominations: 1
- Oscar winners: none

Romania has been submitting films for the Academy Award for Best International Feature Film (Note: The category was previously named the Academy Award for Best Foreign Language Film, but this was changed to the Academy Award for Best International Feature Film in April 2019, after the Academy deemed the word "Foreign" to be outdated.) since 1966. The Best Foreign Film award is handed out annually by the United States Academy of Motion Picture Arts and Sciences to a feature-length motion picture produced outside the United States that contains primarily non-English dialogue.

As of 2026, Romania was nominated only once, for Collective (2020).

== Submissions ==
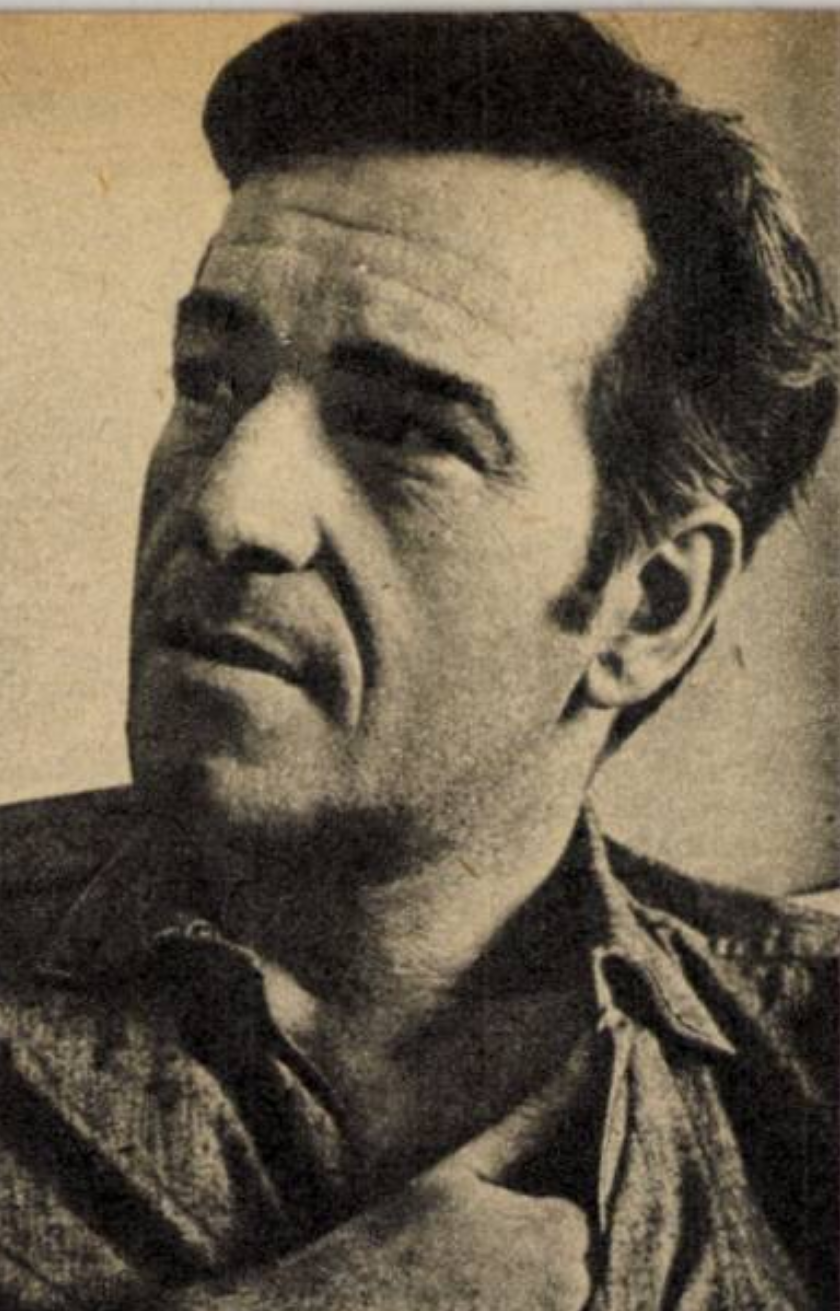
Sergiu Nicolaescu is the most submitted Romanian filmmaker, with four films selected.

The Academy of Motion Picture Arts and Sciences has invited the film industries of various countries to submit their best film for the Academy Award for Best International Feature Film since 1956. The International Feature Film Committee oversees the process and reviews all the submitted films. Following this, they vote via secret ballot to determine the five nominees for the award.

The Romanian nominee is selected each year by a jury selected by the National Center for Cinematography (Centrul Național al Cinematografiei – CNC).

Sergiu Nicolaescu is the filmmaker with most official submissions, representing the country five times. Followed by Radu Jude with four submissions.

Among Romania's more notable submissions include: Carnival Scenes, which was produced in 1981 and banned by Romania's Communist regime, and eventually released in 1989 after the Romanian Revolution; and The Rest Is Silence (2008), the most expensive film in Romanian history.

4 Months, 3 Weeks and 2 Days (2007), the first Romanian film to win the Palme d'Or, was not nominated, stirring controversy over critically acclaimed productions being snubbed for political reasons. The controversy caused Academy members to plead for reforms, implementing the creation of a jury to the category first phase voting, which acted from 2008 to 2020.

Even though 21st century Romanian cinema is marked for the popularity of the Romanian New Wave in numerous international film festivals, gaining top prizes at Cannes, Berlin, Locarno, Venice and Karlovy Vary, as of 2026, no filmmaker of the movement has been nominated despite multiple submissions, including: Cristi Puiu, Cristian Mungiu, Corneliu Porumboiu, Florin Șerban, Călin Peter Netzer, Radu Jude, and Emanuel Pârvu.

The country first and only nomination is the documentary Collective (2020), directed by Alexander Nanau, which was also nominated for Best Documentary Feature.

Beyond the Hills (2012) advanced to the December shortlists, but it was not nominated.

Most of the films submitted are primary in Romanian. Below is a list of the films that have been submitted by Romania for review by the Academy for the award since 1966, by year and the respective Academy Awards ceremony. Romania did not enter the competition every year, including a six-year absence from 1977 to 1982.

Year (Ceremony)	Film title used in nomination	Original title	Language(s)	Director(s)	Result
1966 (39th)	The Uprising	Răscoala	Romanian	Mircea Mureșan	Not nominated
1968 (41st)	The Column	Columna	Romanian	Mircea Drăgan	Not nominated
1969 (42nd)	A Woman for a Season	Răutăciosul adolescent	Romanian	Gheorghe Vitanidis	Not nominated
1971 (44th)	The Last Crusade	Mihai Viteazul	Romanian	Sergiu Nicolaescu	Not nominated
1973 (46th)	Veronica		Romanian	Elisabeta Bostan	Not nominated
1976 (49th)	The Doom	Osânda	Romanian	Sergiu Nicolaescu	Not nominated
1983 (56th)	Return from Hell	Întoarcerea din iad	Romanian	Nicolae Mărgineanu	Not nominated
1984 (57th)	Glissando		Romanian	Mircea Daneliuc	Not nominated
1985 (58th)	Ciuleandra		Romanian	Sergiu Nicolaescu	Not nominated
1986 (59th)	The Last Assault	Noi, cei din linia întîi	Romanian	Sergiu Nicolaescu	Not nominated
1989 (62nd)	Those Who Pay With Their Lives	Cei care plătesc cu viața	Romanian	Șerban Marinescu	Not nominated
1990 (63rd)	Carnival Scenes	De ce trag clopotele, Mitică?	Romanian	Lucian Pintilie	Not nominated
1992 (65th)	Luxury Hotel	Hotel de lux	Romanian	Dan Pița	Not nominated
1993 (66th)	The Conjugal Bed	Patul conjugal	Romanian	Mircea Daneliuc	Not nominated
1994 (67th)	Pepe & Fifi	Pepe și Fifi	Romanian	Dan Pița	Not nominated
1996 (69th)	State of Things	Stare de fapt	Romanian	Stere Gulea	Not nominated
1998 (71st)	Next Stop Paradise	Terminus Paradis	Romanian	Lucian Pintilie	Not nominated
1999 (72nd)	The Famous Paparazzo	Faimosul paparazzo	Romanian	Nicolae Mărgineanu	Not nominated
2002 (75th)	Philanthropy	Filantropica	Romanian	Nae Caranfil	Not nominated
2004 (77th)	Orient Express	Orient Express	Romanian	Sergiu Nicolaescu	Not nominated
2005 (78th)	The Death of Mr. Lazarescu	Moartea domnului Lăzărescu	Romanian	Cristi Puiu	Not nominated
2006 (79th)	The Way I Spent the End of the World	Cum mi-am petrecut sfârșitul lumii	Romanian	Cătălin Mitulescu	Not nominated
2007 (80th)	4 Months, 3 Weeks and 2 Days	4 luni, 3 săptămâni și 2 zile	Romanian	Cristian Mungiu	Not nominated
2008 (81st)	The Rest Is Silence	Restul e tăcere	Romanian, French	Nae Caranfil	Not nominated
2009 (82nd)	Police, Adjective	Polițist, adj.	Romanian	Corneliu Porumboiu	Not nominated
2010 (83rd)	If I Want to Whistle, I Whistle	Eu când vreau să fluier, fluier	Romanian	Florin Șerban	Not nominated
2011 (84th)	Morgen		Romanian, Hungarian, Turkish	Marian Crișan	Not nominated
2012 (85th)	Beyond the Hills	După dealuri	Romanian	Cristian Mungiu	Made shortlist
2013 (86th)	Child's Pose	Poziția Copilului	Romanian	Călin Peter Netzer	Not nominated
2014 (87th)	The Japanese Dog	Câinele japonez	Romanian, Japanese	Tudor Cristian Jurgiu	Not nominated
2015 (88th)	Aferim!		Romanian, Vlax Romani, Turkish	Radu Jude	Not nominated
2016 (89th)	Sieranevada		Romanian	Cristi Puiu	Not nominated
2017 (90th)	Fixeur		Romanian, French	Adrian Sitaru	Not nominated
2018 (91st)	I Do Not Care If We Go Down in History as Barbarians	Îmi este indiferent dacă în istorie vom intra ca barbari	Romanian, French, Spanish, English, German	Radu Jude	Not nominated
2019 (92nd)	The Whistlers	La Gomera	Romanian, English, Silbo Gomero, Spanish	Corneliu Porumboiu	Not nominated
2020 (93rd)	Collective	Colectiv	Romanian	Alexander Nanau	Nominated
2021 (94th)	Bad Luck Banging or Loony Porn	Babardeală cu bucluc sau porno balamuc	Romanian, English	Radu Jude	Not nominated
2022 (95th)	Imaculat		Romanian	Monica Stan and George Chiper	Not nominated
2023 (96th)	Do Not Expect Too Much from the End of the World	Nu aștepta prea mult de la sfârșitul lumii	Romanian, English, German, Hungarian, Italian	Radu Jude	Not nominated
2024 (97th)	Three Kilometres to the End of the World	Trei kilometri pâna la capătul lumii	Romanian	Emanuel Pârvu	Not nominated
2025 (98th)	Traffic	Jaful Secolului	Romanian, Dutch, English	Teodora Mihai	Not nominated
2026 (99th)	Fjord		Norwegian, English, Romanian, Swedish	Cristian Mungiu	Pending

== Shortlisted Films ==
Year	Film
2022	Blue Moon · Metronom · Miracle · R.M.N. · The Wishing Tree: Childhood Memories

== See also ==
- List of Academy Award winners and nominees for Best International Feature Film
- List of Academy Award-winning foreign language films
- List of Romanian films
- Cinema of Romania
