= A Police Superintendent Accuses =

Un comisar acuză
- Directed by: Sergiu Nicolaescu
- Written by: Eugen Burada; Vintilă Corbul; Mircea Gândilă; Sergiu Nicolaescu
- Starring: Sergiu Nicolaescu; Jean Constantin; Gheorghe Dinică; Amza Pellea; Ion Besoiu
- Cinematography: Alexandru David
- Edited by: Dan Naum
- Music by: Richard Oschanitzky
- Release date: April 1, 1974
- Running time: 114 minutes
- Country: Romania
- Language: Romanian

A Police Superintendent Accuses (Romanian: Un comisar acuză) is a 1974 Romanian crime drama film by Sergiu Nicolaescu and starring himself as Police Commissioner Tudor Moldovan. The film is based on a true event, the Jilava Massacre which took place during World War II. Movie's main cast are played by actors Sergiu Nicolaescu, Gheorghe Dinică, Jean Constantin, Amza Pellea, Ion Besoiu, and Emmerich Schäffer.

== Plot ==
In 1940 in Bucharest, Romania, police superintendent Moldovan is heading the investigation of an organized massacre of political prisoners at the Viraga prison. A large group of political opponents of the fascist National Legionary State regime has been systematically massacred in their cells, including several communist activists, and Moldovan's investigation soon reveals a Legionary death squad belonging to the powerful pro-Nazi Iron Guard organisation committed the massacre, and as Moldovan continue investigating the fanatic legionnaires, as its members are called, he soon also becomes a target for assassination. When his mother is murdered and Moldova himself is ambushed at her funeral, he knows he must confront the fanatic legionnaires, and personally one of their leaders, the former criminal Paraipan.

== Cast ==
- Sergiu Nicolaescu as police commissioner Tudor Moldovan
- Jean Constantin as the pickpocket Limba
- Gheorghe Dinică as the legionary commissioner Paraipan
- Amza Pellea as worker Pirvu
- Ion Besoiu as the police prefect Vișan Năvodeanu
- Emmerich Schäffer as Professor Stavru Naumescu
- Ștefan Mihăilescu-Brăila as Nea Costache
- Alexandru Dobrescu as lawyer Marin
- Marin Moraru as commissioner Ghiță Petrescu
- Vasile Nițulescu as commissioner Ilarie Bucur
- Jean Lorin Florescu as Alexandru Dincă
- Corneliu Gârbea as legionnaire Chirvasie
- Paul Fister as legionnaire Zisu
- Vasile Popa as legionnaire Cristea
- Mircea Anghelescu as prosecutor Halunga
- Constantin Dinulescu as aide to police prefect
- Andrei Bursaci as police commissioner Ionescu
- Corneliu Revent as chief of staff of police prefect
