= Mircea (film) =

- Directed by: Sergiu Nicolaescu
- Written by: Titus Popovici
- Starring: Sergiu Nicolaescu; Adrian Pintea
- Music by: Adrian Enescu
- Release date: November 17, 1989
- Running time: 137 minutes
- Country: Romania
- Language: Romanian
- Budget: 21 million lei

Mircea (AKA: Proud Heritage) is a 1989 Romanian film about Mircea the Elder, the Christian king of Wallachia who repelled the attempts at conquest made by the Ottoman Empire in the late 14th century and early 15th century. The film also depicts a young Vlad the Impaler, Mircea's grandson, who would succeed him on the throne and continue his legacy of resistance against the Ottoman invasion.

== Cast ==
- Sergiu Nicolaescu as Mircea I of Wallachia
- Adrian Pintea as Vlad II Dracul
- Șerban Ionescu as Michael I of Wallachia, Mircea's son
- Vlad Nemeș as Vlad III the Impaler
- Colea Răutu as Izzeddin Bey
- Vladimir Găitan as Sigismund, Holy Roman Emperor
- Silviu Stănculescu as Ene Udobă
- Ion Besoiu as the priest Gerolamo
- Ion Rițiu as Bayezid I
- George Alexandru as Mehmed I
- Ioana Pavelescu as Elisaveta
- Manuela Hărăbor as Irina
- Traian Costea as Dan I of Wallachia, Mircea's stepbrother
- Corneliu Gârbea as Ion Iercău
- Ștefan Velniciuc as Jean de Nevers
- Virgil Flonda as the archer Will Stapleton

== Production ==
The screenplay was written by Titus Popovici and the film was directed by Sergiu Nicolaescu. In the film, the main character is named Mircea the Great, avoiding the wording Mircea the Elder in order not to be associated with the advanced age of Nicolae Ceaușescu (71 years old in 1989). After being edited at the direction of Ceaușescu (who disliked several aspects of the movie), the film premiered at the Patria Cinema in Bucharest, on November 17, 1989, just one month before the start of the Romanian Revolution.

== See also ==
- List of historical drama films
