= The Ring (1985 film) =

1984 film

- Directed by: Sergiu Nicolaescu
- Written by: Ioan Grigorescu
- Starring: Marin Moraru
- Release date: July 1985
- Running time: 96 minutes
- Country: Romania
- Language: Romanian

The Ring (Romanian: Ringul) is a 1985 Romanian drama film directed by Sergiu Nicolaescu. It was entered into the 14th Moscow International Film Festival.

== Cast ==
- Marin Moraru as Tom
- Sergiu Nicolaescu as Tudor Andrei
- Constantin Brînzea as young Tudor Andrei
- Vasile Boghiță as old Adolf Gebauer / Martin Hoffmann 'Golem' (as Mihai V. Boghita)
- Marian Culiniac as young Adolf Gebauer
- Karl Michael Vogler as boxing arena announcer (as Mihail Vogler)
- Lætitia Gabrielli as Karin (as Letitia Gabrielli)
- Iurie Darie as representative of the Bio-Aktiv company
- Sebastian Papaiani as Bio-Aktiv presenter and match organizer
- Maria Bănică as the ballerina
- Corneliu Gârbea as representative of the Bio-Aktiv company (as Cornel Gîrbea)
- Eusebiu Ștefănescu as the camp commandant
