= The Doom =

1976 film

- Directed by: Sergiu Nicolaescu
- Written by: Sergiu Nicolaescu; Victor Ion Popa; Anusavan Salamanian
- Starring: Amza Pellea
- Cinematography: Alexandru David
- Release date: 13 September 1976
- Running time: 100 minutes
- Country: Romania
- Language: Romanian

The Doom (Romanian: Osânda), also released as The Punishment, is a 1976 Romanian drama film directed by Sergiu Nicolaescu. The film was entered into the 10th Moscow International Film Festival where Amza Pellea won the award for Best Actor. The film was also selected as the Romanian entry for the Best Foreign Language Film at the 49th Academy Awards, but was not accepted as a nominee.

== Plot ==
Peasant Manolache Preda returns to his village after an absence of twelve years. After serving ten years in the salt mines as punishment for killing the local landowner during a peasant's revolt, he served two years in the army, fighting in WW1. On his return he finds his wife has sold his land to the nephew of the landowner he killed and has taken up with another man. Shunned by other villagers, he finds work with the Boyar, the landowner, but when the Boyar is killed by local bandits he runs for his life, fearing he will be blamed.

== Cast ==
- Amza Pellea as taranul Manolache Preda
- Ernest Maftei as cantonierul Sava Petrache
- Gheorghe Dinică as Ion, Seful de Post de Jandarmi
- Ioana Pavelescu as taranca Ruxsandra
- Sergiu Nicolaescu as Procurorul Tudor Marin
- Emmerich Schäffer as Boierul Leon Paraianu
- Mihai Mereuta as Plutonierul Bobinca
- Aimée Iacobescu as Magda Paraianu

== See also ==
- List of submissions to the 49th Academy Awards for Best Foreign Language Film
- List of Romanian submissions for the Academy Award for Best Foreign Language Film
