= The Column =

Columna
- Directed by: Mircea Drăgan
- Written by: Titus Popovici
- Produced by: Artur Brauner; Constantin Toma
- Starring: Richard Johnson; Antonella Lualdi; Ilarion Ciobanu; Amedeo Nazzari; Ștefan Ciubotărașu; Florin Piersic; Amza Pellea; Sidonia Manolache; Emil Botta; Franco Interlenghi; Mircea Albulescu; Gheorghe Dinică
- Cinematography: Nicu Stan
- Edited by: Dragoș Vitkovschi
- Music by: Theodor Grigoriu
- Release date: 18 October 1968
- Running time: 133 minutes
- Country: Romania
- Language: Romanian

The Column (Romanian: Columna) is a 1968 Romanian historical film directed by Mircea Drăgan. The film was selected as the Romanian entry for the Best Foreign Language Film at the 41st Academy Awards, but was not accepted as a nominee.

The action starts near the end of Trajan's Dacian Wars (106 AD), when south western Dacia was transformed into a Roman province: Roman Dacia. It covers the years after the war, including the beginnings of the Romanization and Romanian ethnogenesis, the construction of Ulpia Traiana Sarmizegetusa, resistance of the Free Dacians, and first barbarian invasions.

== Plot ==
=== Part 1 ===
As the Romans under Trajan take the Dacian capital Sarmizegetusa, the Dacian king Decebalus and his closest followers are forced to retreat. Trajan takes command of the city and orders one of his officers, Tiberius, to pursue the defeated king. In a cave, Decebalus broods on his defeat, and tells his devoted supporter Gerula that the Dacian people must continue to resist. Tiberius and his men catch up with Decebalus and Gerula. Decebalus kills himself to avoid capture. To Gerula's horror, Tiberius chops off Decebalus' head and right hand as trophies to take back to Trajan. While they are returning to the Roman camp, Gerula escapes. He gathers together a group of Dacians and takes them to a part of the land not yet under Roman control.

At Sarmizegetusa, Trajan orders Tiberius to remain in Dacia and preside over the Romanisation of the territory, building fortifications, victory monuments, and Roman settlements. Tiberius initially meets resistance from the local people, but wins over influential local chief Ciungu when he shows clemency to his rebellious son. One of the Roman centurions, Sabinus, falls in love with a local woman, a devotee of the Dacian god Zalmoxis. They become lovers.

The Romans seem to be building a successful community, but nearby, in a secret location, Gerula is training up free Dacians, including Decebalus's grandson, to launch a new campaign to destroy the Romans and restore the Dacian kingdom. Sabinus accidentally discovers the free Dacian camp, and a clash occurs, during which Gerula slashes Sabinus' face, blinding him. Andrada, an aristocratic Dacian woman who has killed a Roman soldier, is brought back to the camp. Again Tiberius shows clemency. He also tries to woo Andrada, who rejects him. Eventually, after a period of distrust, Tiberius wins over Andrada, and the couple are married. Tiberius tells Ciungu that he intends to build a town, and use Roman technology to improve the lives of the Dacian people. Andrada gives birth to her first child with Tiberius, a boy. He proudly shows the baby to the community, to cheers from both Romans and Dacians.

=== Part 2 ===
Years later, Tiberius has built up the settlement into a Roman town. Trajan sends a Roman official to legally declare it to be a municipality. During the ceremony the official is killed by an arrow — shot by one of Gerula's men. The colony nevertheless prospers. The blinded Sabinus becomes the local schoolteacher, instructing the children in Roman culture. Andrada, however, also passes on Dacian lore and stories of pre-Roman times to her son. Decebalus's grandson is now fully grown, becoming the potential new king Gerula wants him to be. Gerula decides it is time to launch the war of liberation against the Romans and their collaborators. A shipment of mined gold is attacked. Almost all those travelling with it, including Ciungu, are killed. One man is left alive to tell Tiberius that all such "traitors" will be killed. Tiberius is furious. He arranges a meeting with Gerula and tells him that if the Romans and the Dacians continue to attack each other, they will only weaken the country, making it ripe for invasion by the barbarians to the north. Gerula ponders this possibility. While doing so, he comes across Tiberius' young son, who has wandered away from the town to explore. Talking to him, he realises that Dacia's heritage still lives in its new generation under Roman rule.

Just as Tiberius predicted, the chief of the northern barbarians plans to use the disorder in Dacia to expand into its territory. He meets with Gerula and suggests they join to expel the Romans. Gerula decides that such an alliance would only replace invaders who brought civilization, with invaders who will bring barbarism. He convinces Decebalus's grandson to aid the Romans. The barbarian chief launches his attack on the Roman town. Tiberius has prepared sophisticated defences, but the force of the barbarian attack threatens to overwhelm the Romans until the free Dacians come to their aid in a cavalry attack. Tiberius sends in the Roman cavalry to support them and the barbarians are crushed. However, Decebalus's grandson is killed in the battle. Devastated, Gerula realises his dream of a restored Dacian kingdom is over. As Tiberius approaches the body of Decebalus' grandson, Gerula imagines he intends to decapitate him, as he did his grandfather. Confused and distraught, Gerula attacks and kills Tiberius.

Tiberius' body is brought back to the town accompanied by a chastened Gerula. As Andrada laments, Gerula tells the dead man's son that his father was a great warrior who fought for his people, and that he must grow up to defend the new country his father helped create.

== Cast ==
- Richard Johnson – Tiberius (voiced in Romanian by Mircea Albulescu)
- Antonella Lualdi – Andrada (voiced in Romanian by Valeria Gagealov)
- Ilarion Ciobanu – Gerula
- Amedeo Nazzari – Emperor Trajan (voiced in Romanian by Geo Barton)
- Ștefan Ciubotărașu – Ciungu
- Florin Piersic – Sabinus
- Amza Pellea – Decebalus
- Sidonia Manolache – Zia
- Emil Botta – High Priest
- Franco Interlenghi – Optimus
- Gheorghe Dinică – Bastus
- Constantin Bărbulescu – Marius Fortunatus
- Maria Cupcea – Prisosta, mother of Bastus
- Bogdan Untaru
- Nicolae Sireteanu
- Jean Lorin Florescu – Apollodorus

== Reception ==
The film's world premiere was held on October 24, 1968, at the International Film Festival in San Francisco. The premiere of the German version was held on 1 November 1968 at Vienna, while the Romanian version premiere took place on November 18, 1968, in Bucharest.

The Column was seen by 10,508,376 viewers in cinemas in Romania, as confirmed by a record of the number of spectators from the film's Romanian premiere date until 31.12.2007 compiled by the National Center of Cinematography. This places it in 7th place among the most viewed Romanian films of all time.

The Column was Romania's submission for the best foreign film Oscar in 1969, but it was not one of the nominated in the competition. The film was given a Diploma of Merit International Film Festival in Adelaide, Australia.

== See also ==
- Dacii (film)
- List of submissions to the 41st Academy Awards for Best Foreign Language Film
- List of Romanian submissions for the Academy Award for Best Foreign Language Film
