= Dan Puric =

Romanian actor, theatre director, pantomime artist and political activist

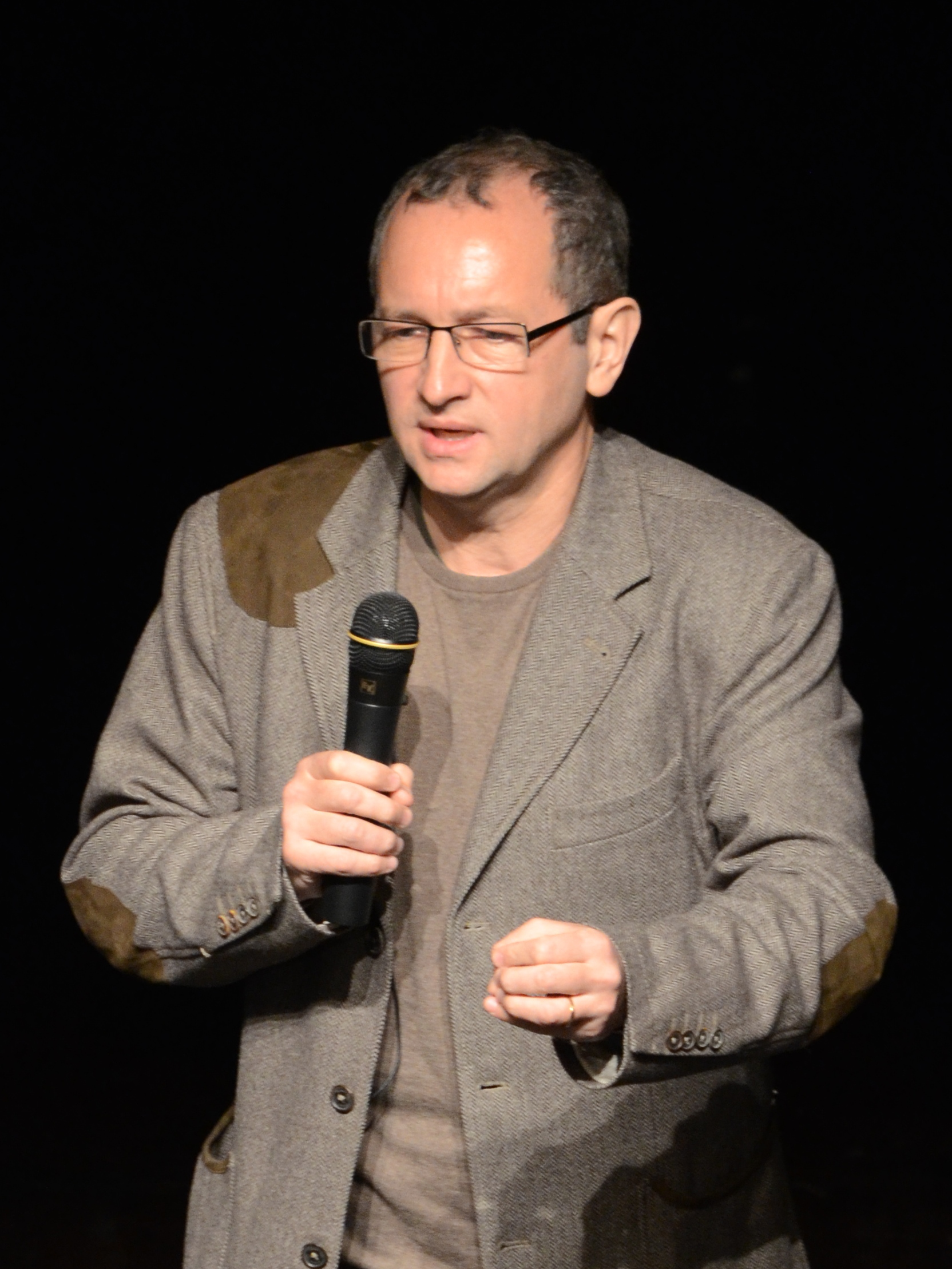
- Puric in 2012
- Born: 12 February 1959 (age 67); Buzău, Romanian People's Republic
- Education: Caragiale National University of Theatre and Film
- Occupations: Actor, theatre director
- Political party: Independent
- Awards: Order of the Star of Romania, Knight rank

Liviu Dan Puric (Romanian pronunciation: [dan ˈpurik]; born 12 February 1959) is a Romanian actor, theatre director, pantomime artist, and political activist.

== Biography ==
He graduated in 1978 from the fine arts high school Nicolae Tonitza in Bucharest, and in 1985 from the Institute of Theatrical and Cinematographic Arts, Bucharest. Between 1985 and 1988, he was an actor at the Mihai Eminescu Theatre in Botoșani. Nowadays, he is an actor at the National Theatre Bucharest. His shows — Toujours l'amour, Made in Romania, Costumele (The Costumes), Don Quijote — have been played in many countries. He played the main role in Broken Youth. He also played in films for the public television in Lausanne, Switzerland.

== Filmography ==
- Prea cald pentru luna mai (1983) — Ștefan
- Imposibila iubire (1984) — Vasilică
- Salutări de la Agigea (1984) — Sile
- Sosesc păsările călătoare (1985) — Țâfnă
- Vară sentimentală (1986) — Mircea Abrudan
- Primăvara bobocilor (1987) — Ermolai
- Pădurea de fagi (1987) — Mircea
- O vară cu Mara (1989) — Dinu Fericeanu
- Un studio în căutarea unei vedete (1989) — Dan
- Broken Youth (1991) — Cola
- Orient Express (2004) — Count Orkovski

== Books ==
- Cine suntem (in Romanian). Bucharest: Editura Platytera. 2008. OCLC 503077913.
- Despre omul frumos (in Romanian). Bucharest: Editura Platytera. 2009. ISBN 9789730063820. OCLC 503078434.
- Puric, Dan (2011). Fii demn!: in amintirea mamei mele (in Romanian). Bucharest. ISBN 9789730115932. OCLC 937817678.
- Suflet românesc (in Romanian). Bucharest: Compania Dan Puric. 2013. ISBN 9789730157031. OCLC 901502027.
- Dulci: jurnalul unui câine (in Romanian). Bucharest: Compania Dan Puric. 2015. ISBN 9786069371817. OCLC 1079263370.
- Să fii român! (in Romanian). Bucharest: Compania Dan Puric. 2016. ISBN 9786069371824. OCLC 1347180123.

== Awards ==
- Order of the Star of Romania, Knight rank, for "exceptional services in culture" (2000).
- Romanian Royal Family: 39th Knight of the Royal Decoration of the Cross of the Romanian Royal House (2009).
