= Marin Moraru =

Romanian actor

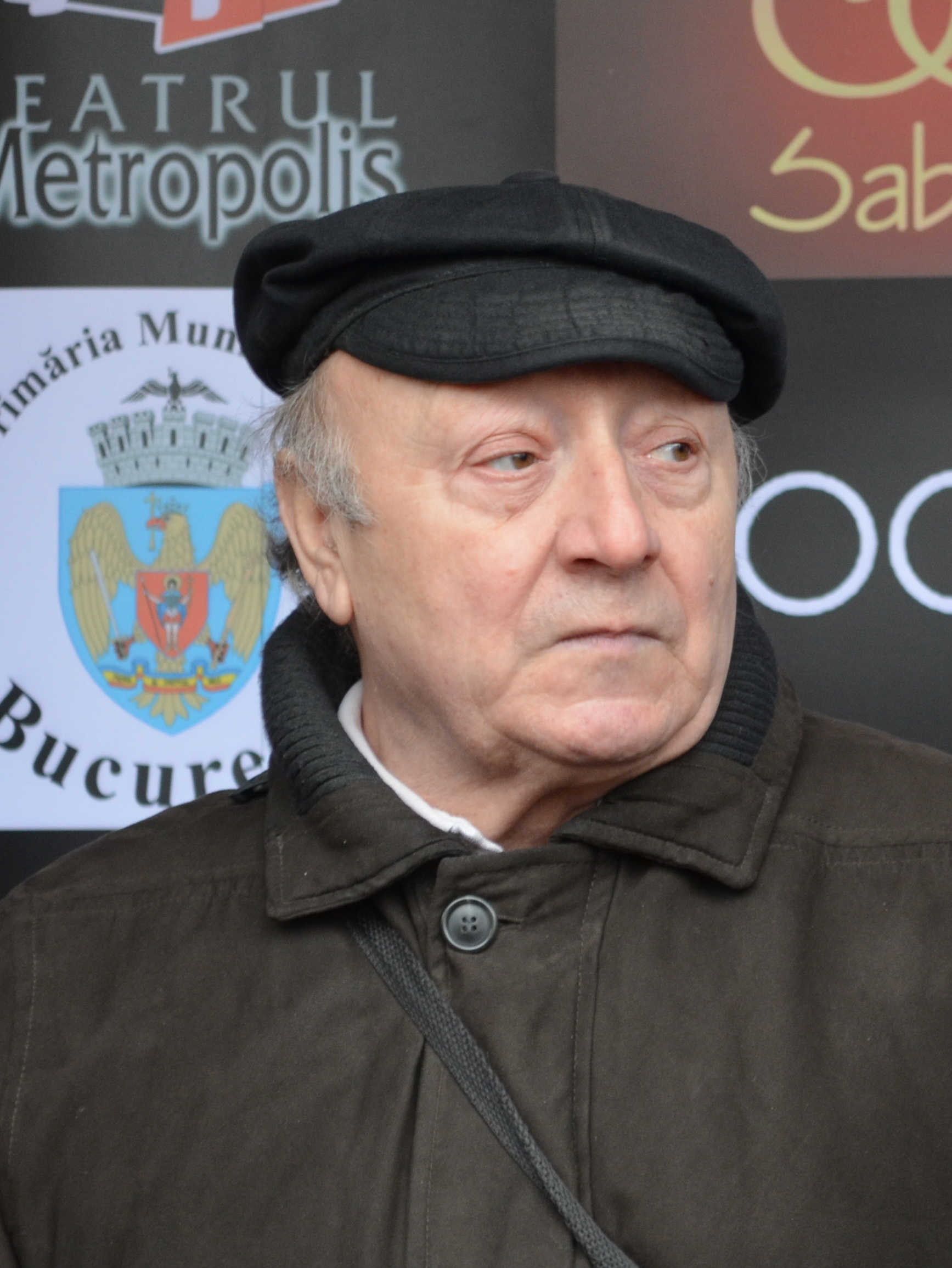
- Born: 31 January 1937; Bucharest, Kingdom of Romania
- Died: 21 August 2016 (aged 79); Bucharest, Romania
- Resting place: Bellu Cemetery
- Education: Caragiale Academy of Theatrical Arts and Cinematography
- Occupation: Actor

Marin Moraru (Romanian pronunciation: [maˈrin moˈraru]; 31 January 1937 – 21 August 2016) was a Romanian stage, film and television actor.

He graduated from the Caragiale Academy of Theatrical Arts and Cinematography in 1961. Moraru performed at the Youth Theatre (1961–1964), Comedy Theatre (1965–1968), Bulandra Theatre (1968–1971) and National Theatre (1971–1974). In 2009, he received the Gopo Award for Lifetime Achievement.

Moraru died on the 21st of August, 2016 at 05:30 pm at the age of 79.

== Filmography ==
- Haiducii (1966)
- Un film cu o fată fermecătoare (1966)
- Maiorul și moartea (1967)
- Răzbunarea haiducilor (1968)
- Felix and Otilia (1972) - Costache Giurgiuveanu
- Filip cel Bun (1974) -
- A Police Superintendent Accuses (1974) - Ghiță Petrescu
- Un zâmbet pentru mai târziu (1974)
- The Actor and the Savages (1975) - Vasile
- Elixirul tinereții (1975)
- Toamna bobocilor (1975) - Toderaș
- Operațiunea Monstrul (1976) - Corneliu
- Tufă de Veneția (1977)
- Iarna bobocilor (1977)
- Concurs (1982)
- Faleze de nisip (1982)
- The Ring (1984)
- Zbor periculos (1984)
- Masca de argint (1985)
- Vară sentimentală (1986)
- Cuibul de viespi (1986)
- Chirița în Iași (1987)
- În fiecare zi mi-e dor de tine (1988)
- Iubire ca-n filme (2006) - Petre Varga
- Inimă de țigan (2007)
- Regina (2008) - Cristofor
- Aniela (2009) - Costică
- Iubire și Onoare (2010)
- Moștenirea (2011) - Toderaș
- Pariu cu viața (2011)
- O nouă viață (2014)
