= Podari =

- Commune
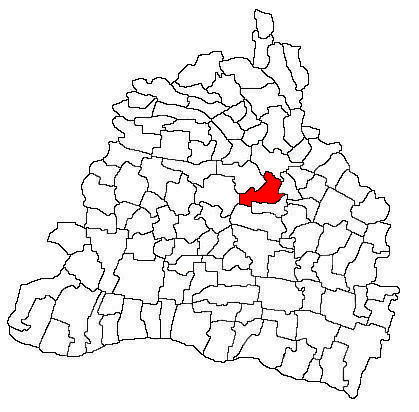
- Location in Dolj County

- Location in Romania
- Coordinates: 44°15′N 23°47′E
- Country: Romania
- County: Dolj
- Area: 67.94 km^{2} (26.23 sq mi)
- Population (2021-12-01): 6,949
  - Density: 102.3/km^{2} (264.9/sq mi)
- Time zone: UTC+02:00 (EET)
  - Summer (DST): UTC+03:00 (EEST)
- Vehicle reg.: DJ

Podari is a commune in Dolj County, Oltenia, Romania. It is composed of five villages: Balta Verde, Braniște, Gura Văii, Livezi, and Podari.

== Natives ==
- Ștefan Andrei (1931–2014), communist politician, Minister of Foreign Affairs from 1978 to 1985
- Ioana Bulcă (1936–2025), film actress
- Tudor Gheorghe (born 1945), musician, actor, and poet
