= Ioana Bulcă =

Romanian actress (1936–2025)

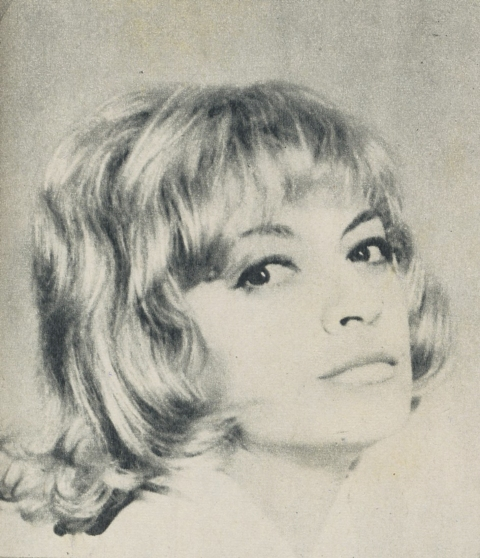
- Born: Ioana Sălciana Bulcă; 7 January 1935; Podari, Kingdom of Romania
- Died: 9 July 2025 (aged 90); Bucharest, Romania
- Resting place: Bellu Cemetery, Bucharest
- Education: I. L. Caragiale National University of Theatre and Film
- Occupation: Actress
- Years active: 1955–2007

Ioana Sălciana Bulcă (7 January 1935 – 9 July 2025) was a Romanian film actress, who appeared in 20 films between 1955 and 2007. She died on 9 July 2025, aged 89.

== Life and career ==
Bulcă was born in Podari, Dolj County, she attended high school in Sibiu. She then went to Bucharest, where she enrolled in the I.L. Caragiale Institute of Theatre and Film Arts (IATC), graduating in 1957.

Bulcă died aged 89, on 9 July 2025. It was announced that she would be buried at Bellu Cemetery.

== Selected filmography ==
- The Mill of Good Luck (1955) – Ana
- Mîndrie (1961) – Silvia
- A Woman for a Season (1969)
- Mihai Viteazul (1971) – Doamna Stanca
- Then I Sentenced Them All to Death (1972)
- Ciprian Porumbescu (1973) – Tereza Kanitz
- Vocea inimii (2006) – Lucreția
- Inimă de țigan (2007) – Afrodita
- Regina (2008) – Ludmila
- Restul e tăcere (2008) – Aristizza Romanescu
- Moștenirea (2010) – Rodia's mother
- O nouă viață (2014) – Vivi's grandmother
