= Mihail, câine de circ =

- Directed by: Sergiu Nicolaescu
- Written by: Jack London (novel); Dumitru Carabăț; Rüdiger Bahr
- Starring: Karl Michael Vogler; Ernest Maftei; Sergiu Nicolaescu; Ilarion Ciobanu; Amza Pellea
- Cinematography: Nicolae Girardi
- Edited by: Adolf Schlyssleder
- Music by: Bert Grund
- Distributed by: Româniafilm
- Release date: 3 September 1979
- Running time: 87 minutes
- Countries: Romania; West Germany
- Language: Romanian

Mihail, câine de circ (English: Michael, Circus Dog) is a 1979 Romanian adventure film directed by Sergiu Nicolaescu. It is based on the novel Michael, Brother of Jerry by Jack London.

== Cast ==
- Karl Michael Vogler – Dag Daughtry
- Ernest Maftei – Greenleaf
- Sergiu Nicolaescu – Harley Kennan
- Ilarion Ciobanu – Captain Duncan
- Amza Pellea – Dr. Emory
- Ion Besoiu – Harry Del Mar
- Vincent Osborne – Kwaque
- Hans W. Hamacher – Captain Doane
- Ileana Popovici – Villa Kennan
- Anthony Chinn – Ah Moy
- Cornel Gîrbea – Grimshaw
- Colea Răutu – Nishikanta
- Mircea Albulescu – Dr. Edmond Masters
- Dina Mihalcea – Mrs. Collins
- Valeria Gagialov – Mary, wife of Dr. Emory (as Valeria Gagealov)
- Ștefan Mihăilescu-Brăila – Sailors recruiter from Sydney
- Ion Anestin – Sailor in San Francisco bar
- Constantin Băltărețu – Waiter in San Francisco
- Vladimir Găitan – Police officer
- Doru Năstase
- Alexandru Dobrescu – Passenger on Makambo
- Mircea Crețu
- Gheorghe Visu – Valet
- Dinu Gherasim
- Ion Andrei
- Alexandru D. Lungu – Waiter in San Francisco
- Nicolae Dide
- Păstorel Ionescu – Dancer
- Vasile Popa
- Titus Gurgulescu
- Ovidiu Georgescu
