= Ciuleandra =

1985 film

- Directed by: Sergiu Nicolaescu
- Written by: Liviu Rebreanu; Sergiu Nicolaescu
- Starring: Ion Rițiu
- Release date: 19 April 1985
- Running time: 112 minutes
- Country: Romania
- Language: Romanian

Ciuleandra is a 1985 Romanian drama film directed by Sergiu Nicolaescu. The film was selected as the Romanian entry for the Best Foreign Language Film at the 58th Academy Awards, but was not accepted as a nominee.

== Cast ==
- Ion Rițiu as Puiu Faranga
- Anca Nicola as Mădălina
- Ion Anghel
- Gheorghe Cozorici
- Alexandru Dobrescu
- Corneliu Gîrbea
- Ștefan Iordache
- Gilda Marinescu
- Romeo Pop

== See also ==
- List of submissions to the 58th Academy Awards for Best Foreign Language Film
- List of Romanian submissions for the Academy Award for Best Foreign Language Film
