= Ernest Maftei =

Romanian actor

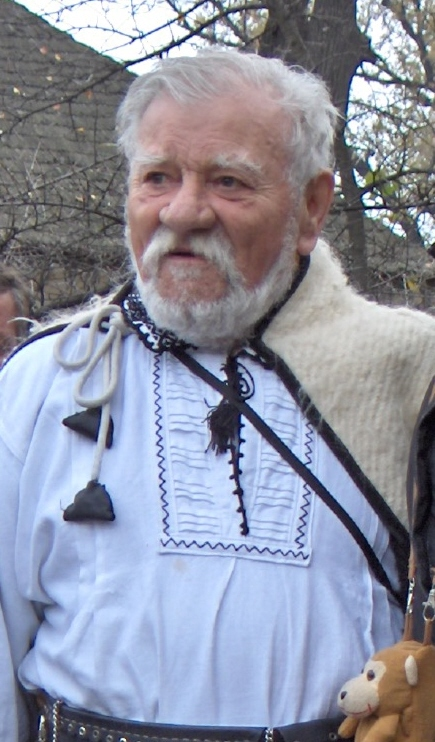
- Born: March 6, 1920; Prăjești, Bacău County, Kingdom of Romania
- Died: 19 October 2006 (aged 86); Bucharest, Romania
- Occupation: Actor
- Years active: 1953–2006

Ernest Maftei (Romanian pronunciation: [ˈernest mafˈtej]; 6 March 1920 – 19 October 2006) was a Romanian film actor. He appeared in more than seventy films from 1953 to 2006.

== Biography ==
Born in Prăjești, Bacău County, he attended high school in Bacău, and, at age 17, he joined the youth branch of the Iron Guard. For his militant activities, he was detained, in 1938, for 5 months at a correctional facility in Vaslui and, later, at prisons in: Galați, Jilava and Văcărești. In 1944, he graduated the Academy of Music and Dramatic Art of Iași. During the early Communist regime, he was arrested and spent more time in prison before being released, after the intervention of some Jews he helped.

In December 1989, Maftei took an active role in the Romanian Revolution, while in June 1990, he was severely beaten during a Mineriad, in Bucharest. He died in Bucharest, in 2006.

== Selected filmography ==
Film
Year	Title	Role	Notes
2005	Lacrimi de iubire	Dionisie	
2003	Trăsniții		
2001	Detectiv fără voie		
1979	Mihail, câine de circ	Greenleaf	
1979	Vlad Țepes (film)	Manzila	
1976	Through the ashes of the empire	The Gypsy	
1976	The Doom	Sava Petrache	
1976	Accident	The grandfather	
1972	Then, I sentenced them all to death	Marcu	
1968	The reenactment		
1965	Răscoala		
