= Karl Michael Vogler =

German actor

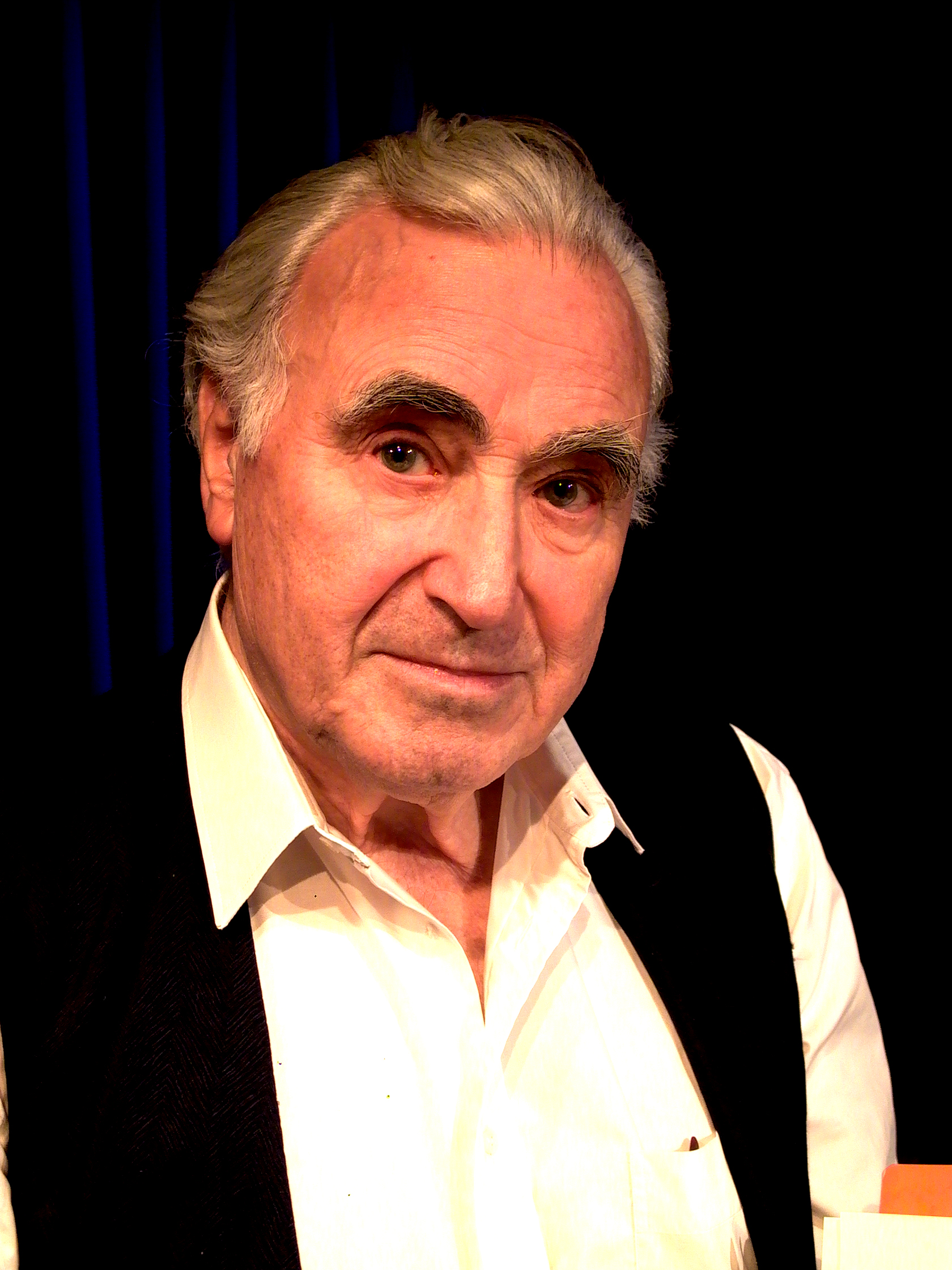
- Vogler in 2003
- Born: 28 August 1928; Remscheid, Germany
- Died: 9 June 2009 (aged 80); Seehausen am Staffelsee, Bavaria, Germany
- Occupation: Actor
- Years active: 1958–2006
- Spouse: Maria Vogler (m. 1953)
- Children: 3

Karl Michael Vogler (28 August 1928 – 9 June 2009) was a German actor, probably best known for his appearances in several big-budget English language films. In The Blue Max (1966), he co-starred with George Peppard and Ursula Andress as the squadron commander, and in Patton (1970), he portrayed General Erwin Rommel. In between, he was in Robert Redford's Downhill Racer (1969) as a ski company owner.

== Career ==
Born in Remscheid, Germany and raised in Bregenz, Austria, Vogler was the son of a blacksmith. After graduation, he started his career as a theatre actor and made his debut in Innsbruck in 1950. Between the 1970s and 2005 he made appearances on German TV and European films.

Vogler primarily worked in German film and television, often typecast as authority figures. He was also an acclaimed stage actor, perhaps best remembered for playing Horatio to Maximilian Schell's Hamlet in 1960's Munich August Festival and a subsequent television adaptation.

Vogler died at age 80 in Seehausen am Staffelsee, Germany.

== Selected filmography ==
- The Man Who Walked Through the Wall (1959) - Junger eleganter Herr
- Hamlet (1961, TV film) - Horatio
- Bekenntnisse eines möblierten Herrn (1963) - Lukas
- Zwei Whisky und ein Sofa (1963) - Klaus Hartmann
- A Man in His Prime (1964) - Richard Mertens
- Karl Sand (1964, TV film) - Follen
- Don't Tell Me Any Stories (1964) - Dr. Nikolaus Feyl
- Those Magnificent Men in Their Flying Machines (1965) - Captain Rumpelstoss
- Der Fall Rouger (1966, TV film) - Authier
- The Blue Max (1966) - Heidemann
- The Lark (1966, TV film) - Earl of Warwick
- Die Geschichte des Rittmeisters Schach von Wuthenow (1966, TV film) - Schach von Wuthenow
- Graf Kozsibrovszky macht ein Geschäft (1966, TV film) - Graf Kozsibrovszky
- Die Zimmerwirtin (1967, TV film) - Monsieur Tienne
- Spiel mit dem Tode (1967, TV film) - Glybowitsch
- Ein Toter braucht kein Alibi (1967, TV film) - Steve Craig
- In Lemgo 89 (1967, TV film) - Dietrich Kleinsorge
- How I Won the War (1967) - Odlebog
- The Dance of Death (1967) - Kurt
- Verräter (1967, TV miniseries) - Larry Edwards
- Fliegender Sand (1967, TV film) - Hans Joachim Gräf
- Feldwebel Schmid (1968, TV film) - Anton Schmid
- Zeit der halben Herzen (1968, TV film) - Wilhelm Forster
- Der Mann, der keinen Mord beging (1968, TV miniseries) - Paul Wunderland
- Der Fall Wera Sassulitsch (1968, TV film) - Alexandrow
- Othello (1968, TV film) - Cassio
- Heimlichkeiten (1968) - Walter Riemeck
- Affaire Dreyfus (1968, TV miniseries) - Captain Alfred Dreyfus
- House of Pleasure (1969) - Prince Borghese
- Charley's Uncle (1969) - Boy Deisen
- Christoph Kolumbus oder Die Entdeckung Amerikas (1969, TV film) - Christoph Kolumbus
- Sir Basil Zaharoff – Makler des Todes (1969, TV film) - Jerome
- Downhill Racer (1969) - Machet
- The Excursion to Tilsit (1969, TV film) - Ansas Balczus
- Der irische Freiheitskampf (1969, TV film) - Éamon de Valera
- Patton (1970) - Field Marshal Erwin Rommel
- Seventeen and Anxious (1970) - Father
- Deep End (1970) - Swimming instructor
- Mourning Becomes Electra (1970, TV film) - Adam Brant
- Die Heirat (1970, TV film) - Kochkaryov
- Fröhliche Weihnachten (1970, TV film) - Peter Eckert
- Der Kommissar: Ende eines Tanzvergnügens (1971, TV series episode) - Barbosse
- Die Eroberung (1971, TV film) - Dupetit
- Maestro der Revolution? (1971, TV film) - Verdi
- Alpha Alpha (1972, TV series) - Alpha
- Sonderdezernat K1: Vier Schüsse auf den Mörder (1972, TV series episode) - Dieter Delfs
- Monsieur Chasse – Wie man Hasen jagt (1972, TV film) - Moricet
- Kara Ben Nemsi Effendi (1973-1975, TV series) - Kara Ben Nemsi
- Tatort: Kneipenbekanntschaft (1974, TV series episode) - Höfer
- Le vieux fusil (1976) - Docteur Müller
- Shout at the Devil (1976) - Von Kleine
- Bait (1976) - Polizeioffizier
- Derrick: Kalkutta (1976, TV series episode) - Keppler
- Generale – Anatomie der Marneschlacht (1977, TV film) - Colonel Alexandre
- The Doctor's Dilemma (1977, TV film) - Sir Colenso Ridgeon
- Ein Mann will nach oben (1978, TV series, 13 episodes) - Bodo von Senden
- Wallenstein (1978, TV miniseries) - Pater Magni
- Mihail, câine de circ (Freundschaft wider Willen; 1979) - Dag Daughtry
- Quartett bei Claudia (1981, TV film) - John
- Years Passed (1981, TV film) - Grandfather
- Die Rosen von Dublin (1981, TV miniseries) - Fritz Hutzinger
- In the Land of Cockaigne (1981, TV film) - Georg Ratibohr
- The Ring (1984) - Crainicul arenei de box
- 5 Rooms, Kitchen, Bathroom (1992, TV film) - Dr. Castellotti
- Das Schwein – Eine deutsche Karriere (1995, TV miniseries) - VanLück
