= Ștefan Mihăilescu-Brăila =

Romanian actor

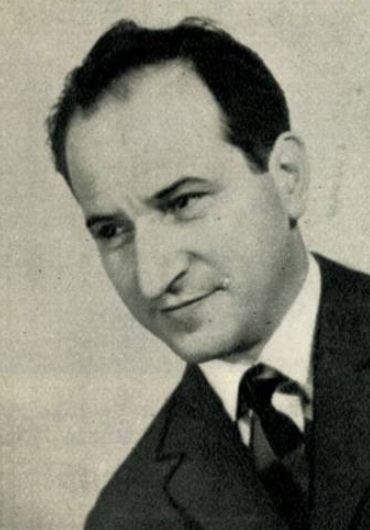
- Born: 3 February 1925; Brăila, Romania
- Died: 19 September 1996 (aged 71); Bucharest, Romania
- Occupation: Actor
- Years active: 1959–1984

Ștefan Mihăilescu-Brăila (Romanian pronunciation: [ʃteˈfan mihə.iˈlesku brəˈila]; 3 February 1925 – 19 September 1996) was a Romanian actor. He appeared in more than fifty films from 1959 to 1984.

== Selected filmography ==
Year	Title	Role	Notes
1961	Darclee		
1965	Răscoala		
1972	Then I Sentenced Them All to Death		
1972	Cu mâinile curate		
1973	A Police Superintendent Accuses		
1976	In the Dust of the Stars		
1976	Accident		
1979	Mihail, câine de circ		
1979	Uncle Marin, the Billionaire		
1984	The Secret of Bacchus		
