= Titus Popovici =

Romanian screenwriter

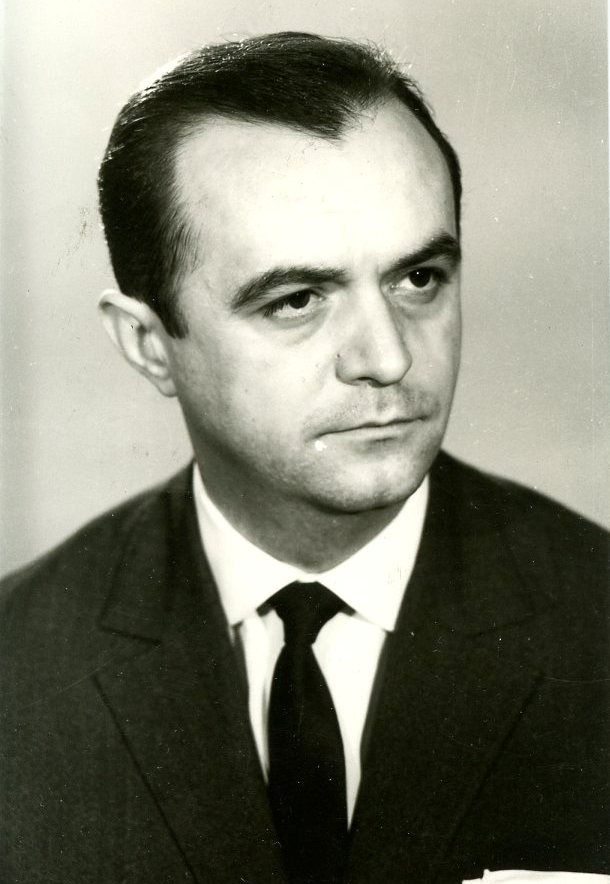
- From the Project Communism in Romania Photo Collection
- Born: 16 May 1930; Oradea, Romania
- Died: 29 November 1994 (aged 64); Tulcea, Romania
- Occupation: Screenwriter
- Years active: 1955-1994

Titus Viorel Popovici (16 May 1930 – 29 November 1994) was a Romanian screenwriter and author.

== Biography ==
He graduated from the University of Bucharest in 1953. Two years later, he published his first novel, Străinul (The Stranger). His first screenplay appeared in 1957. It was an adaptation of the novel Moara cu noroc (The Lucky Mill) by Ioan Slavici. From then on, he concentrated on screenwriting, working with prominent directors such as Liviu Ciulei, Andrei Blaier, Manole Marcus and Sergiu Nicolaescu.

In 1974, he became a corresponding member of the Romanian Academy and joined the Writers' Union of Romania. He was also a member of the Central Committee of the Romanian Communist Party and served in the Great National Assembly as a Deputy from Bihor County.

He died as the result of an automobile accident near Tulcea. It was later suggested that his death was not accidental but, rather, that he was eliminated because he knew too much about the Party's former Nomenklatura.

A street in Oradea was named after him in 2002.

== Selected filmography ==
- The Mill of Good Luck (1955)
- Thirst (1961)
- Forest of the Hanged (1964)
- Dacii (1967)
- The Column (1968)
- Michael the Brave (1970)
- Then I Sentenced Them All to Death (1972)
- Cu mâinile curate (1972)
- Ultimul cartuş (1973)
- The Actor and the Savages (1975)
- The Actress, the Dollars and the Transylvanians (1979)
- Mircea (1989)
