= Michael the Brave (film) =

- Directed by: Sergiu Nicolaescu
- Starring: Amza Pellea; Ion Besoiu; Olga Tudorache; Sergiu Nicolaescu; Ilarion Ciobanu; Mircea Albulescu; Florin Piersic; Ioana Bulcă
- Music by: Tiberiu Olah
- Release date: 1971
- Running time: 203 minutes
- Country: Romania
- Language: Romanian
- Budget: ROL33,000,000 (estimated)

Michael the Brave (Romanian: Mihai Viteazul) is a Romanian historic epic film, directed by Sergiu Nicolaescu and starring Amza Pellea in the leading role. The film is a representation of the life of Wallachia's ruler Michael the Brave, and his will to unite the three Romanian principalities (Wallachia, Moldavia, and Transylvania) into one country. The film was released in 1970 in Romania, and worldwide by Columbia Pictures as The Last Crusade.

== Plot ==
In the 1590s, Mihai Viteazul pursues his claim to be Prince of Wallachia before the Ottoman Sultan. He charms a Genoese countess, Rossana, to provide him with funds to successfully buy the position from the Sultan and ultimately enters into a long-term relationship with her. Mihai is appointed Prince of Wallachia, and his rival, Alexander III the Bad is executed in front of him, but not before the latter warns the Sultan that he would regret his decision.

When Ottoman forces led by Mihai’s friend Selim march into Bucharest demanding tribute, Mihai lures him and his army to a manor before ordering his army to massacre everyone inside, sparing Selim to inform the Ottomans of Mihai’s rejection of their rule. Mihai raises an army that fights its way to the edge of Istanbul before retreating when they learn that help from other Christian armies would not arrive on time. Mihai reluctantly submits himself as a vassal of Prince Sigismund Báthory of Transylvania to find allies in his quest to expel the Ottomans, but instead Sigismund sends minimal reinforcements when Mihai fights the Battle of Călugăreni, which is won by Mihai despite heavy losses.

Sigismund, who continues to sideline Mihai, is defeated by the Turks at the Battle of Keresztes and abdicates in favor of his cousin, Andrew Báthory. Mihai defies Selim’s entreaties for a peace treaty but instead marches to Translyvania as part of his plan to unite the three Romanian principalities. At the Battle of Șelimbăr, Mihai’s forces defeat Andrew, who is killed by soldiers avenging the death of a nobleman that he had approved earlier. Mihai then marches on Moldavia and almost singlehandedly rouses the Moldavian infantry to defect, forcing their Polish overlords to flee. Mihai is then crowned ruler of the three Romanian principalities in Alba Iulia, where Selim meets with Mihai for the last time to inform him of the Sultan’s concurring recognition of his new position.

Sigismund convinces the Holy Roman Emperor Rudolf II to raise an army that would restore him as prince of Transylvania. At the Battle of Mirăslău, Sigismund, a group of rebellious Transylvanian nobles, and a traitorous general in Mihai’s army, Giorgio Basta, rout Mihai’s forces, resulting in the death of Mihai’s son Nicolae. Mihai becomes a fugitive and flees to Prague, where Rudolf then provides him with an army to take on Sigismund, who had gone over to the Turks and had Basta arrested for cuckolding his wife. At the Battle of Guruslău, Mihai and Basta’s forces defeat Sigismund, who flees in humiliation. Upon learning of Mihai’s victory, Rudolf, fearful of Mihai’s threat to his interests, sends secret instructions to Basta ordering Mihai’s assassination. Basta orders two knights to head to Mihai’s camp and shoot him. At the moment of his death, Mihai walks away, as a voiceover recounts his pledge to unite the three Romanian principalities.

== Cast ==
- Amza Pellea as Michael The Brave
- Ion Besoiu as Sigismund Báthory
- Olga Tudorache as Michael The Brave's mother
- Irina Gardescu as Contessina Rossana Viventini
- György Kovács as Andrei Báthory
- Sergiu Nicolaescu as Selim Pasha
- Nicolae Secăreanu as Sinan Pasha
- Ilarion Ciobanu as Stroe Buzescu
- Aurel Rogalschi as Rudolf II
- Ioana Bulcă as Doamna Stanca
- Septimiu Sever as Radu Buzescu
- Florin Piersic as Preda Buzescu
- Klára Sebök as Maria Cristina de Graz
- Mircea Albulescu as Popa Stoica
- Emmerich Schäffer as Giorgio Basta
- Colea Răutu as Sultan Murat III
- Constantin Codrescu as Alexander III the Bad
- Alexandru Herescu as Ionică
- Corneliu Gârbea as General Baba Novac
- Alexandru Repan as Earl Viventini
- Jean Lorin Florescu as Archduke Maximilian

== Production ==
The film was produced in 1970 after a script by Titus Popovici. It starred Amza Pellea in the lead role, while the cast included a number of the best Romanian actors at the time, including Sergiu Nicolaescu, Ion Besoiu, Olga Tudorache, Florin Piersic, Ilarion Ciobanu, Silviu Stănculescu, and Mircea Albulescu.

The film had initially been intended to be an American-Romanian superproduction, with Columbia Pictures proposing actors such as Charlton Heston, Orson Welles, Laurence Harvey, Elizabeth Taylor, Richard Burton, or Kirk Douglas. But at Nicolae Ceaușescu's insistence, the production was approved only with Romanian actors.

The story is historically less authentic, but is full of grand battle scenes, political plots, betrayals and family drama. To reenact the battles that Mihai Viteazul fought against the Turks, some 5,000 soldiers of the Romanian Army were brought to the set. Some reports put this number around 10,000 soldiers. The film has two parts and was shot in several locations, such as Istanbul, Prague, and Călugăreni, but also the Danube, the Black Sea, Alba Iulia, Carpathian Mountains, Bucharest, Sibiu, Sinaia, and Mirăslău. The budget at the time was around 14 million lei, which in 2010 was estimated to be worth to be around 500,000 US dollars, a relatively high sum for its period.

== Release ==
The film was released in Romania in 1970 and ran in the cinemas for several years. Worldwide, it was distributed by Columbia Pictures, under the name The Last Crusade. The film debuted outside of Romania in July 1971 at the 7th Moscow International Film Festival and in East Germany, and in March 1972 in Finland, in June 1972 in West Germany and in April 1973 in Japan.

In 2000, the soundtrack of the film was redone in Dolby Surround. It is estimated that the film will be re-released in Blu-ray format sometime in 2010.

== Reception ==
The film is the most viewed Romanian film worldwide. It was Romania's entry for an Academy Award for Best Foreign Language Film in 1972, but was not accepted as a nominee. At the Moscow International Film Festival in 1971, it won a Golden Award, but lost to Bilyy ptakh z chornoyu vidznakoyu (The White Bird Marked with Black). Nevertheless, it won at the Beaume Historic Film Festival in 1974, ahead of El Cid.

With a rating on 8.4 on Internet Movie Database, it is rated as the twentieth best historic film of all time. It is considered 18th in the biography category, 40th in the war category, and 34th in the action category. The director himself, Sergiu Nicolaescu, declared that he was impressed by the rating especially as it is an American website and the film was released four decades before.

== See also ==
- List of submissions to the 44th Academy Awards for Best Foreign Language Film
- List of Romanian submissions for the Academy Award for Best Foreign Language Film
