= Orient Express (2004 film) =

2004 film

Orient Express is a 2004 Romanian film directed by Sergiu Nicolaescu. It was Romania's submission to the 77th Academy Awards for the Academy Award for Best Foreign Language Film, but was not accepted as a nominee.

== Cast ==
- Sergiu Nicolaescu as Prince Andrei Morudzi
- Maia Morgenstern as Baroness Amalia Frunzetti
- Imola Kézdi as Ana Criveanu
- Dan Bittman as Young Andrei Morudzi
- Gheorghe Dinică as Costache
- Valentin Teodosiu as Vasile Gărdescu
- Ioana Moldovan as Isabelle Beny
- Vlad Zamfirescu as Bob
- Dan Puric as Count Orkovski
- Marina Procopie as Elena Criveanu
- Florin Zamfirescu as Take Criveanu
- Daniela Nane as Carmen Ionescu
- Alina Chivulescu as Adrienne de Raval
- Cristian Șofron as Priest Anton

== See also ==
- List of submissions to the 77th Academy Awards for Best Foreign Language Film
- List of Romanian submissions for the Academy Award for Best Foreign Language Film
