= Carol I (film) =

2009 historical documentary film

- Directed by: Sergiu Nicolaescu
- Written by: Ion Bulei, Stelian Turlea, Sergiu Nicolaescu, Emil Slotea
- Produced by: MediaPro Pictures
- Starring: Sergiu Nicolaescu; Răzvan Vasilescu; Cristian Motiu
- Release date: May 8, 2009 (Romania)
- Running time: 90 minutes
- Country: Romania
- Language: Romanian

Carol I, also known as Charles I: A Destiny and Charles I: A Destiny for Romania, is a 2009 historical documentary film by Romanian director Sergiu Nicolaescu, starring Sergiu Nicolaescu, Razvan Vasilescu and Cristian Motiu.

Carol I is one of the few Romanian films to portray the Romanian King Carol I. The king was also portrayed in the 1912 film Independenţa României (The Independence of Romania), directed by Aristide Demetriade, and in the 2007 film "The Rest is Silence". The director of Carol I, Sergiu Nicolaescu, previously played Carol I in his 1977 film, Pentru patrie.

== Plot ==
The film begins in the summer of 1914. At 75 years of age, King Carol I, the founder of modern Romania, is living a quiet life at the Peleș Castle. He has by his side Queen Elisabeth, his devoted wife and friend.

The king faces the pains of age with sobriety, although these do not compare to his moral dilemma. Carol I is in a tough position; his family roots dictate that he should enter World War I alongside the German Empire and the Austro-Hungarian Monarchy, but public opinion calls for Romania to remain neutral.

The king plays his last card in the Crown Council. He tries to persuade the representatives of the people to enter the war alongside the Central Powers.
