= Sergiu Nicolaescu =

Romanian film director, actor and politician (1930–2013)

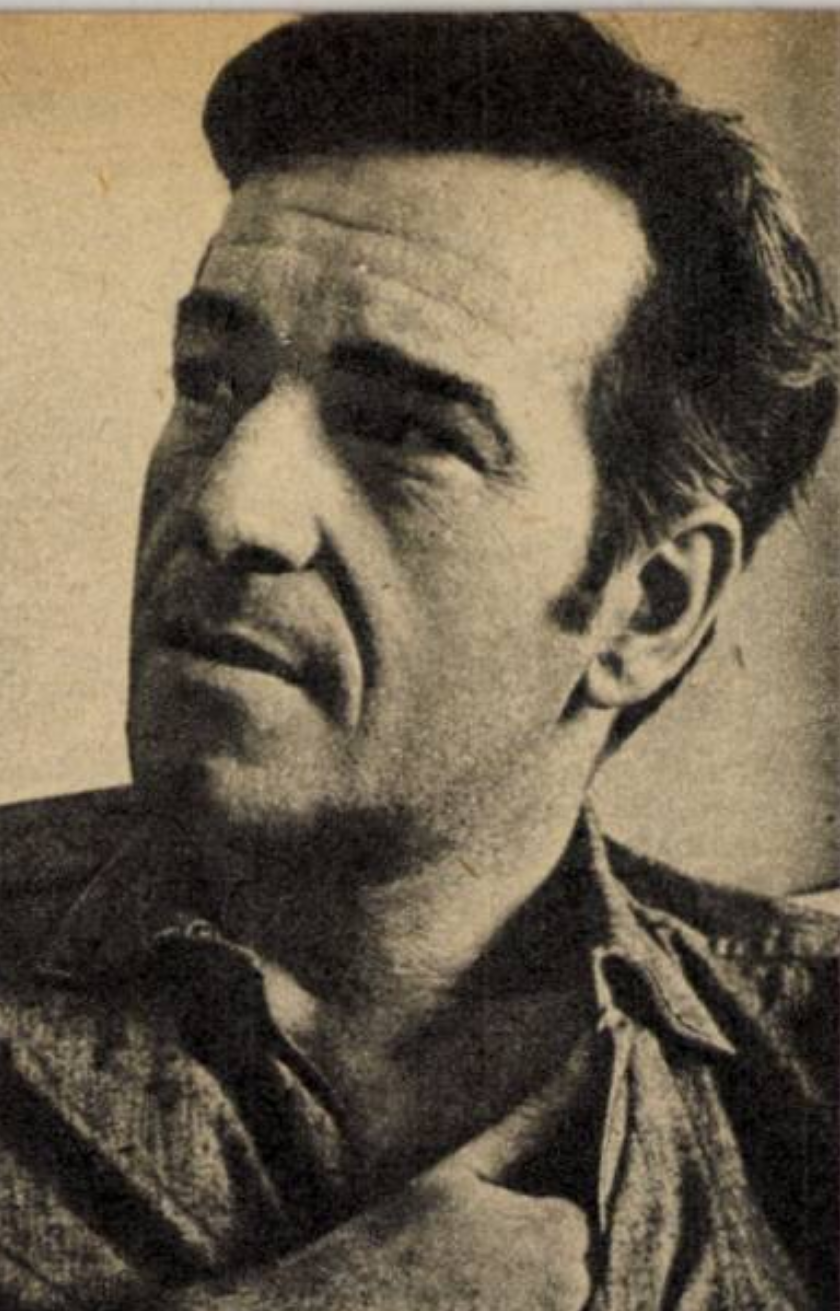
- Nicolaescu in May 1982
- Born: Sergiu Florin Nicolaescu; 13 April 1930; Târgu Jiu, Kingdom of Romania
- Died: 3 January 2013 (aged 82); Bucharest, Romania
- Education: Politehnica University of Bucharest
- Occupations: Film director; actor; politician
- Years active: 1962–2013
- Website

Senator of Romania
- In office 1990–2012

Personal details
- Party: Social Democratic Party (since 2001)
- Other political affiliations: Romanian Communist Party (Before 1989); National Salvation Front (1989–1992); Democratic National Salvation Front (1992–1993); Party of Social Democracy in Romania (1993–2001)

Sergiu Florin Nicolaescu (Romanian: [ˈserd͡ʒju floˈrin nikolaˈesku]; 13 April 1930 – 3 January 2013) was a Romanian film director, actor and politician.

He was best known for his historical films, such as Mihai Viteazul (1970, released in English both under the equivalent title Michael the Brave and also as The Last Crusade), Dacii (1966, Les Guerriers), Războiul Independenței (1977, War of Independence), as well as for his series of thrillers that take place in the interwar Kingdom of Romania, such as Un comisar acuză (1973, A Police Inspector Calls). Joanna Pacuła starred in his film The Last Night of Love in 1980 before eventually emigrating to the United States, where she went on to a very successful career.

== Early life and education ==
Sergiu Nicolaescu's father was Nicola Pantilimon, an Aromanian who emigrated from Macedonia to Oltenia. Sergiu was born in Târgu Jiu, Gorj County, but grew up in Timișoara, where his family moved when he was 5 years old. He graduated from the Politehnica University of Bucharest as a mechanical engineer. After graduation he started to work as a camera operator. He was hard-working, well-organized, curious, intelligent and keen of learning. During these years he acquired many of the skills that have proved so useful when making his later movies.

== Film director, writer and actor ==
Nicolaescu was considered one of Romania's most prominent and prolific film directors. During his film career spanning 55 years, he was involved in the creation of around 60 movies, often simultaneously serving as a film director, as an actor, and the writer/screenplayer. In Romania, he is remembered for his contributions to the national film industry, his historical and patriotic-themed productions, and his distinctive public presence.

Nicolaescu's debut as a director was in 1962 with the short film Scoicile nu au vorbit niciodată (Shells Have Never Spoken). His first feature film was the 1967 French-Romanian co-production Dacii (Les Guerriers). The film was entered into the 5th Moscow International Film Festival. Nicolaescu continued his film-making career by both directing a large number of movies and starring in many of his own films. His 1971 film Mihai Viteazul was entered into the 7th Moscow International Film Festival. As an anecdotal detail, in Steven Spielberg's E.T. The Extraterrestrial (original version only), the young boy Elliott watches this movie on TV – Mihai Viteazul in the US version – the scene with the battle of Calugareni. His 1976 film The Doom was entered into the 10th Moscow International Film Festival.

Mihai Viteazul (Michael the Brave) ruled the Romanian-speaking principalities (Wallachia, Moldavia, and Transylvania), a union he accomplished under his reign for a very brief period (1600–1601). It was initially planned that Sergiu Nicolaescu would produce Mihai Viteazul with Hollywood superstars playing the lead characters. The communist authorities of the time drastically ruled for an all Romanian cast. The obstacle, eventually, was circumvented by means of casting, in the lead role of Mihai Viteazul the actor Amza Pellea, who achieved a masterful rendition of the hero. Sergiu Nicolaescu was able, throughout his career, to select the best actors available for the characters they had to portray.

Most of Nicolaescu's films are built around figures and events in Romanian history, and although showing superior mastery, in the (imposed) realistic approach they somewhat follow the patterns of historical movies from the Communist governed countries. During the Communist period, some of these movies were seen as ground-breaking through either their way of publicly presenting Romanian history, or the masterful depiction of the heroical dimension of its history. For instance, the movie "Războiul independenţei" was the first picture made during the Communist-era in Romania to describe a King of Romania (namely Carol I) in a positive fashion. On the other hand, Mircea (1989, also known as Proud Heritage) was considered by some critics as being a less artistically fulfilled endeavour. Nevertheless, Mircea was officially blocked from distribution, until the Romanian Revolution of 1989 ("All I've done was to present a different state leader than Nicolae Ceaușescu. He understood and stopped the movie [from premiere]"). Yet, when Mircea was finally released to the public the film was very well appreciated.

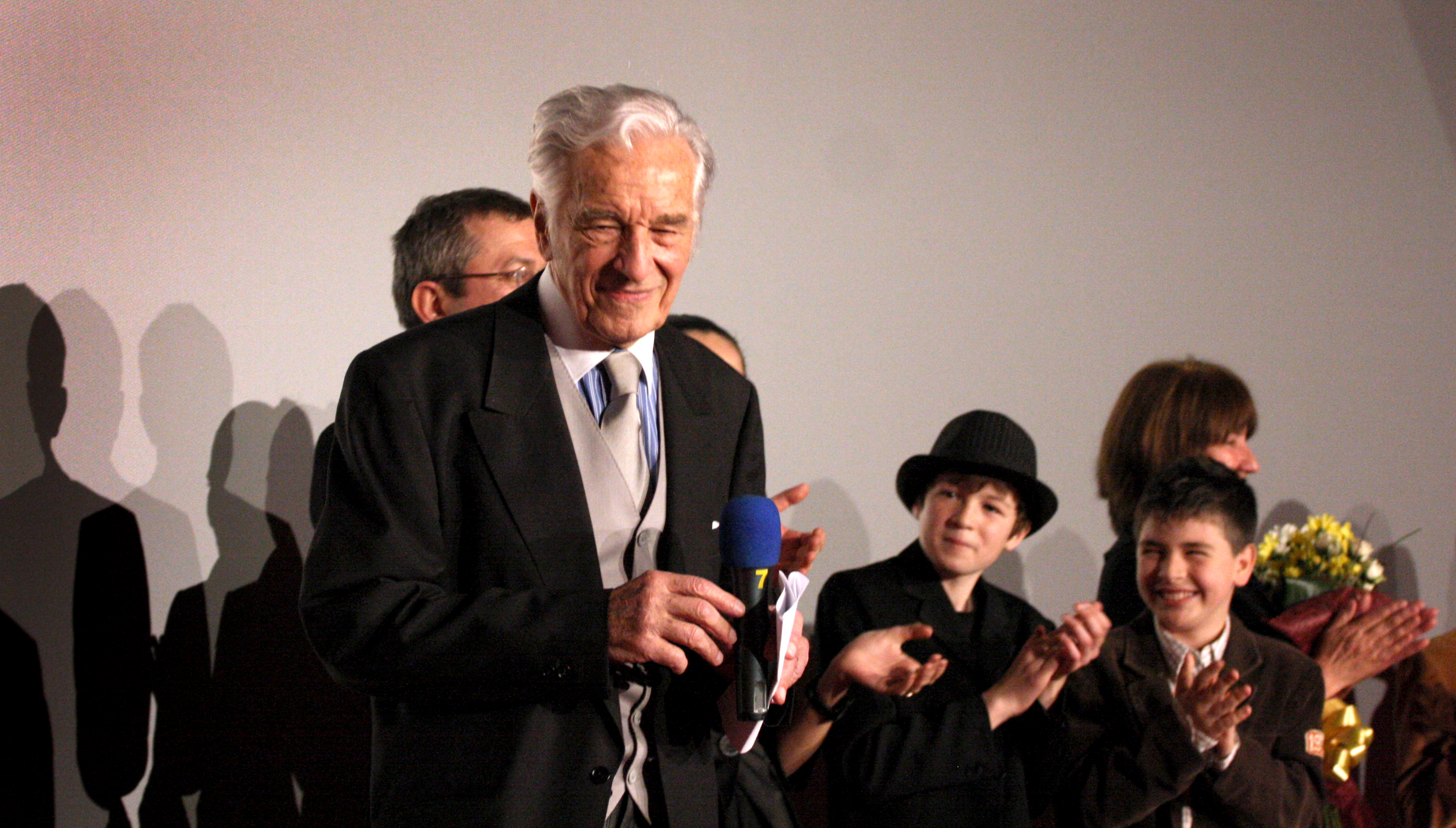
Sergiu Nicolaescu at the premiere of Carol I

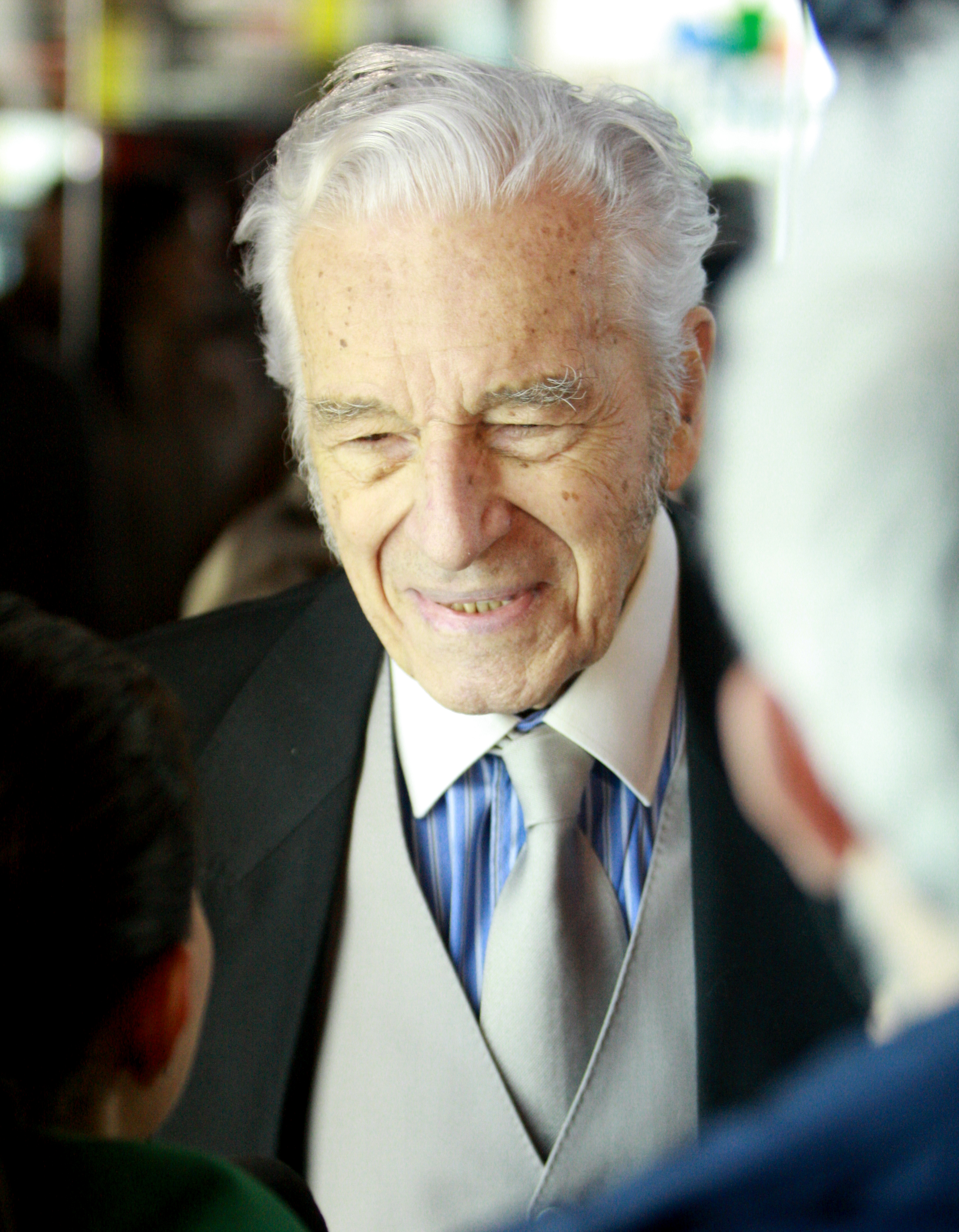
Sergiu Nicolaescu at the premiere of Last corrupt in Romania

Nicolaescu produced renderings of the historical battles and costumes. For example, through his reenactments of the Battle of Călugăreni in Mihai Viteazul and both the Crusade of Nicopole and the Battle of Rovine in Mircea, Nicolaescu demonstrates technical expertise , directing a large acting crew (actors, extras, etc.) towards the rendering of accurate details, which contributed to the success of his movies. While making Mihai Viteazul, Nicolaescu managed a 5,000-member crew, including actors and extras and, despite the obvious technical limitations in the area of communication in the 1970s (in particular no mobile phones were available at that time), he imposed a strict discipline during filming of every cannon fire and every attack scene, allowing everything to come together under his order.

His movie Mihai Viteazul was considered the best of the Romanian historical movies and is one of the most appreciated world-wide of this kind (for example, considering IMDb ratings). The film was released in 1970 in Romania, and worldwide by Columbia Pictures as The Last Crusade. A TV sequence in Steven Spielberg's "E.T." (original, uncut version) show images from "Mihai Viteazul" (scenes with the Battle of Călugăreni).

While creating such historical movies he was supported by the Romanian Ministry of Defence with large numbers of extras and war equipment. He documented his historical movies meticulously, to this end seeking the advice of military consultants and distinguished historians of the Romanian Academy. Regardless these films have aesthetic qualities too, and are the expression of Sergiu Nicolaescu's vision as both a film director and a writer.

His 1985 film The Ring was entered into the 14th Moscow International Film Festival. For this movie, Nicolaescu performed a very intensive boxing training with a former European boxing champion. The intensity of his training for this movie was similar to what the Romania's Olympic boxing team at that moment performed. At that time Nicolaescu was 50 years old and its boxing matches and the hits during this movie are real and against strong opponents.

His work capacity was noted by colleagues and crew. His filmmaking has also been noted for the use of high-risk techniques while filming. For instance, for the war scenes, he used real dynamite and trotyl as well as real blood. These techniques carried a risk that actors or camera operators would be reluctant to perform their tasks. Sergiu Nicolaescu is noted for demonstrating difficult or risky tasks to actors and camera operators before they performed them. During his 50-year career as a film director and actor, Nicolaescu experienced several accidents or illnesses, and continued to complete his film projects, including during the production of Mihai Viteazul).

After Mircea, Nicolaescu expands on historical themes, directing films that shed positive light on Ion Antonescu, Romania's Axis-aligned dictator in the World War II period (his Începutul adevărului, also known as Oglinda), or glorified the World War I heroine Ecaterina Teodoroiu (Triunghiul morţii, also known as Triangle of Death).

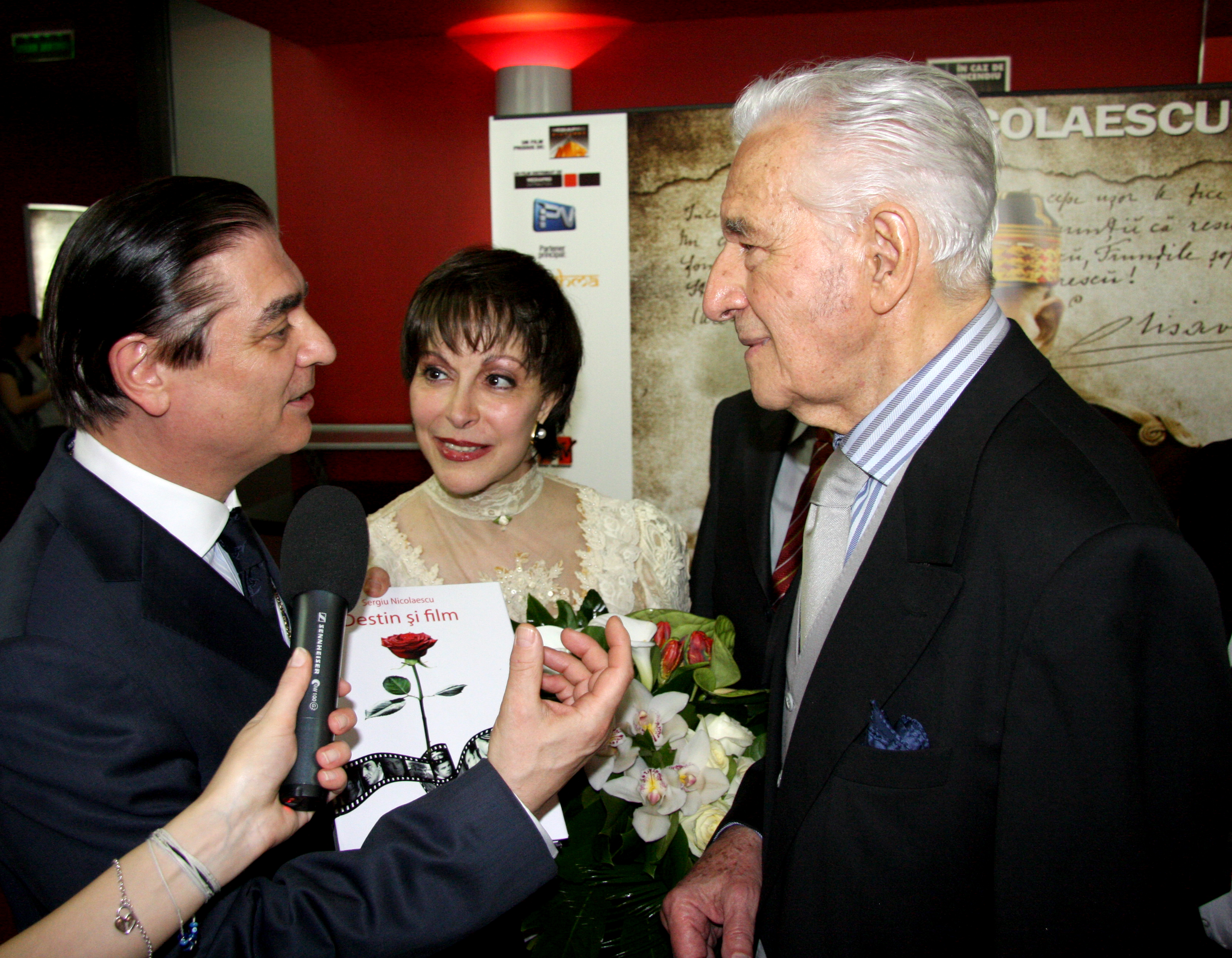
Sergiu Nicolaescu and Paul Lambrino

An accomplished battle scenes director, Sergiu Nicolaescu, as legend has it, would have been able to film some 70–80 meters of useful shots in the same amount of time that the average director would need in order to produce 12–15 meters.

Although his last films were not as popular as his earlier productions, he continued to direct new films, such as Orient Express (2004) or Cincisprezece (2005), a love story set during the Romanian Revolution of 1989, Supraviețuitorul (2008), Carol I (2009), and Poker (2010).

When asked to nominate three movies he made that he most liked, Nicolaescu chose Mihai Viteazul (also known as Michael the Brave), Osînda (also known as The Doom) and Atunci i-am condamnat pe toți la moarte (also known as Then I Sentenced Them All to Death).

== Politician ==
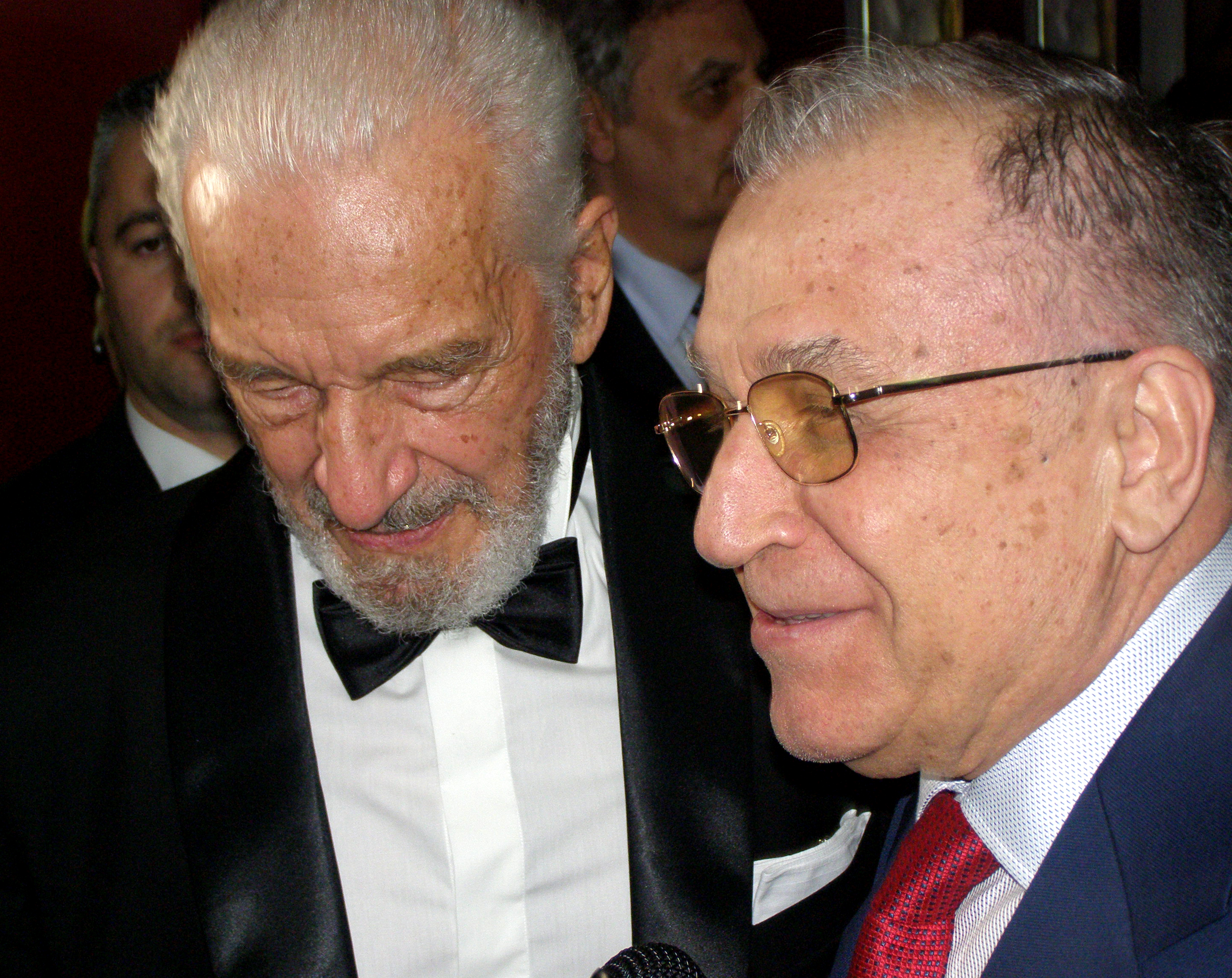
Sergiu Nicolaescu with Ion Iliescu

Nicolaescu started his political career during the 1989 Romanian Revolution. At the time the Revolution took place he was very well known and respected for his films, in Romania. He participated actively at the Romanian Revolution and his appearance and speech during the Revolution brought about coherence and clarity to the people who listened. In December 1989 he was received with a standing ovation (his name) from the crowd of hundreds of thousands of Romanians gathered in the heart of Bucharest after Nicolae Ceaușescu left power on 22 December 1989. He called for calm, and asked the crowd to listen to and support Ion Iliescu. A protégé of Ion Iliescu, Nicolaescu went on to play an important political role during the Revolution and was elected to the Romanian Senate in 1992 as a member of the Romanian Social Democratic Party. He left the party in April 2011, and then rejoined it after only two days.

In 2005 Nicolaescu declared in an interview that he was not happy with his decision of going into politics. He felt that the politics took too much from his precious time and because of that he was not able to do as many films as before the Revolution.

== Personal life ==
=== Sports and personal life ===
Nicolaescu said that as a young boy, he practiced many sports like athletics, equestrianism, boxing, shooting, and rugby. According to the public information available, Nicolaescu was a very active person and he had a very disciplined lifestyle. Every day, even when he was 80 years old, he spent at least one hour doing physical activity (gymnastics, etc.).

Although he was never a very passionate football fan, Nicolaescu stated in a 2011 interview for the Romanian daily sports newspaper Gazeta Sporturilor that capital-based team Steaua București was the dearest to him throughout time, even though he played rugby at Dinamo București. He explained this by saying that he liked the former Steaua legends Gheorghe Hagi, László Bölöni and Dan Petrescu more than Dinamo's players. Nicolaescu declared in the same interview that he also liked Ripensia Timișoara and Universitatea Craiova in their glory days, but not as much as Steaua.

Nicolaescu was married three times. He did not have children and this was his main regret.

=== Failing health and death ===
Nicolaescu had been diagnosed since 2000 with diverticulitis, a benign and chronic digestive condition that was acting up every couple of years. In January 2008 he underwent brain surgery twice due to an accident. At that time, he was 78 years old. The doctors did not give him any chance for success because at the time of his first brain operation he was completely paralyzed. He had to learn how to walk, speak and write again, and he successfully managed to do it after 3 months of intense physiotherapy and neurological exercise. Nevertheless, after this brain surgeries he said he changed dramatically: he started feeling his age and he started changing his behaviour (more impatient and irritable). In his last years the health problems made his life difficult. Yet he continued directing, acting and planning new films. He maintained intact his huge passion for filmmaking until the end of his life.

On 26 December 2012 he was admitted with atrial fibrillation and a traumatised thorax with pulmonary contusion to the Elias Hospital in Bucharest. He complained of pain in the lower abdomen and loss of appetite. After the clinical examination, the doctors concluded that he was suffering from an acute episode of diverticulitis, and he received treatment for this condition. During the treatment, Nicolaescu's condition improved, but the intestinal transit was not functional and the blood work was still unsatisfactory. The doctors opted for an exploratory laparoscopy, which led to the discovery of an acute perforated appendicitis complicated with peritonitis. After undergoing surgery, Nicolaescu developed respiratory complications, leading to acute respiratory failure within 48 hours. He entered into cardiac arrest on 3 January 2013, and could not be resuscitated by the hospital staff. He was pronounced dead at 8:20 AM GMT+2. His body was cremated on 5 January 2013, according to his wishes.

== Feature films ==
=== Director ===
- Dacii (1966)
- The Last Roman (1968, directed by Robert Siodmak, Second unit director)
- Leatherstocking Tales (co-directors Pierre Gaspard-Huit and Jean Dréville, TV miniseries, 1968)
1. The Deerslayer
2. The Last of the Mohicans
3. Adventures in Ontario a.k.a. Lacul din Ontario a.k.a. Das Fort am Biberfluß
4. The Prairie
- Michael the Brave (1971)
- Then I Sentenced Them All to Death (1972)
- Cu mâinile curate (1972)
- Der Seewolf a.k.a. The Sea-Wolf (co-director Wolfgang Staudte, TV miniseries, 1972)
- A Police Superintendent Accuses (1973)
- Ultimul cartuș (1973)
- Nemuritorii (1974)
- Two Years' Vacation (co-directors Gilles Grangier and Claude Desailly, TV miniseries, 1975)
- Zile fierbinți (1975)
- Burning Daylight (co-director Wolfgang Staudte, TV miniseries, 1975)
- The Punishment (1976)
- Războiul independenței (Pentru patrie) (co-directors Doru Năstase, Gheorghe Vitanidis) (1977)
- Accident (1977)
- Revenge (1978)
- Uncle Marin, the Billionaire (1979)
- Mihail, câine de circ (1979)
- The last night of love (1980)
- Capcana mercenarilor (1981)
- Duelul (1981)
- Întîlnirea (1982)
- Cucerirea Angliei a.k.a. Guillaume le Conquérant a.k.a. William the Conqueror (co-director Gilles Grangier, TV miniseries, 1982)
- Viraj periculos (1983)
- The Ring (1984)
- Căutătorii de aur (1984)
- Ciuleandra (1985)
- Ziua Z (1985)
- The Last Assault (1985)
- François Villon – Poetul vagabond (TV miniseries, 1987)
- Mircea (1989)
- Coroana de foc (1990)
- Începutul adevărului (1994)
- Punctul zero (1996)
- Triunghiul morții (1999)
- Orient Express (2004)
- 15 (2005)
- Supraviețuitorul (2008)
- Carol I (2009)
- Poker (2010)
- Ultimul corupt din România (2012)

=== Actor ===
- Dacii (1966) – Marcus – Roman Centurion
- Michael the Brave (1971) – Ottoman Vizier Selim Pasha
- Then I Sentenced Them All to Death (1972) – Colonel von Eck
- Cu mâinile curate (1972) – Tudor Miclovan
- Felix and Otilia (1972) – Pascalopol
- A Police Superintendent Accuses (1973) – Tudor Moldovan
- Ultimul cartuș (1973) – Comisarul Miclovan
- Dragostea începe vineri (1974)
- Nemuritorii (1974) – Captain Andrei
- The Doom (1976) – Prosecutor Tudor Marian
- Roșcovanul (1976) – Sentinel at Școala de Corecție
- Zile fierbinți (1976) – Mihai Coman
- Accident (1977) – Major Petria
- Pentru patrie (1977) – King Carol of Romania
- Revenge (1978) – Tudor Moldovan
- Drumuri în cumpana (1978) – Dobre
- Mihail, câine de circ (1979)
- The last night of love (1980) – Lawyer/Major Nicolau
- Capcana mercenarilor (1981) – Major Tudor Andrei
- Duelul (1981) – Comisarul Moldovan
- Wilhelm Cuceritorul (1982)
- Întîlnirea (1982) – Filip
- Viraj periculos (1983) – Colonel Andrei Petria
- The Ring (1984) – Tudor Andrei
- Ziua Z (1985)
- The Last Assault (1985) – General Marinescu
- Mircea (1989) – King Mircea the Elder
- Coroana de foc (1990) – Capt. Gorun
- Începutul adevărului (1994)
- Triunghiul morții (1999) – General Averescu
- Orient Express (2004) – Andrei Morudzi
- Poveste de cartier (2008) - Aristide
- Supraviețuitorul (2008) – Comisarul
- Carol I (2009) – Carol I
- Lupu (2013) – The old man (final film role)
