= Silviu Stănculescu =

Romanian actor

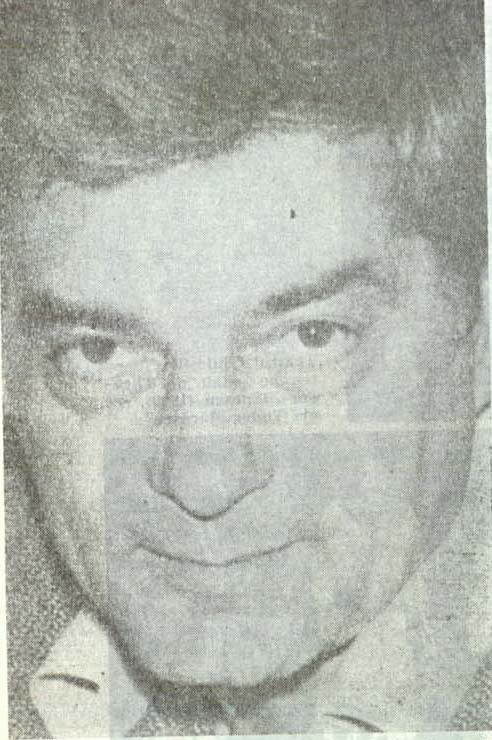
- Silviu Stănculescu in 1985
- Born: 24 January 1932; Timișoara, Kingdom of Romania
- Died: 23 October 1998 (aged 66); Bucharest, Romania
- Resting place: Bellu Cemetery, Bucharest
- Education: Caragiale National University of Theatre and Film
- Occupation: Actor
- Years active: 1960–1998
- Employer: Comedy Theatre of Bucharest
- Spouse: Corina Stănescu (née Pîrvulescu)
- Children: 3

Silviu Stănculescu (Romanian pronunciation: [ˈsilvju stəŋkuˈlesku]; 24 January 1932 – 23 October 1998) was a Romanian stage and screen actor. He appeared in more than forty films from 1960 to 1998.

Born in Timișoara, he graduated in 1956 from the I.L. Caragiale Institute of Theatre and Film Arts (IATC) in Bucharest. On the theatre stage, he played in adaptations of Meșterul Manole, The Charterhouse of Parma, The Rainmaker, La Machine à écrire, and Harap Alb. From 1981 to 1990 he was the director of the Comedy Theatre from Bucharest.

He married Corina Stănescu (née Pîrvulescu), whom he had met while in high school in Caracal. The two had a daughter, Rodica (1962), who died at age 4, and later another daughter, Catrinel (1968), and a son, Radu (1970).

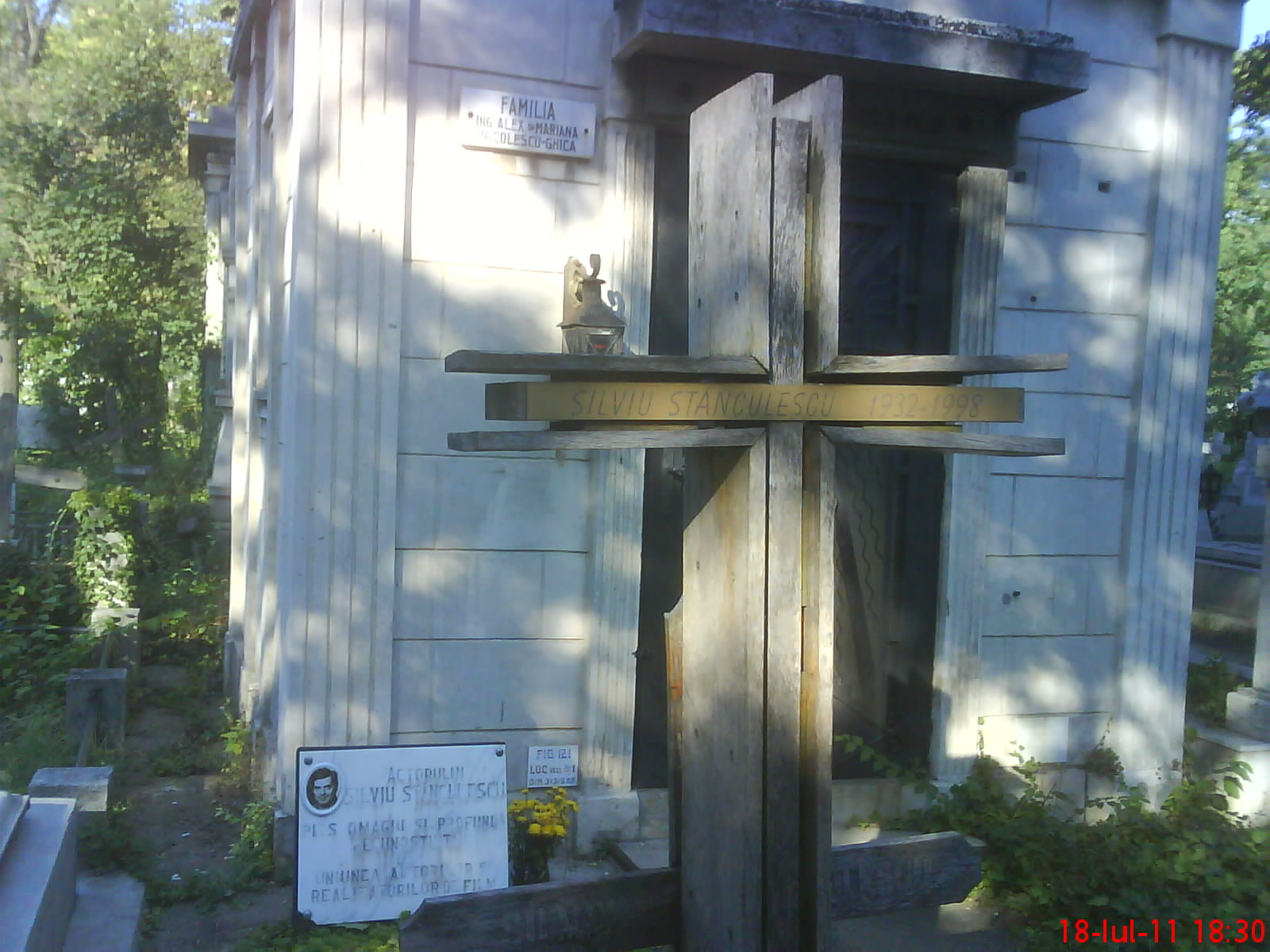
Stănculescu's grave at Bellu Cemetery, in Bucharest

Stănculescu died of leukemia at Victor Babeș Hospital in Bucharest, at age 66. He was buried in the city's Bellu Cemetery, on the Artists' Lane. Streets in Târgoviște and Voluntari are named after him.

== Selected filmography ==
Year	Title	Role	Notes
1961	Aproape de soare	Abrudan	
1962	Străzile au amintiri	Ilieș	
1963	Partea ta de vină...	Petre Mărăi	
1964	La patru pași de infinit	Mihai	
1965	Dincolo de barieră	Luca	
1967	Cerul începe la etajul III	Mihai Dan	
1969	Simpaticul domn R	Marcel	
1972	Puterea și adevărul	Old communist	
1973	Parașutiștii	Nicu Deleanu	
1973	Conspirația	Marin Varlam	
1973	Vifornița	Varlaam Ștefu	
1974	Capcana	Marin Varlam	
1975	Pe aici nu se trece	Colonel Maxineanu	
1976	Ultima noapte a singurătății	Liviu Ardeleanu	
1976	Bunicul și doi delincvenți minori	Nicolae Apostol	
1977	Misterul lui Herodot	Aurel Miron	
1978	Acțiunea "Autobuzul"	Marius Mardopol	
1978	Revenge	Alexandru Rioșanu	
1978	Din nou împreună	Mayor Mihalcea	
1979	Vlad Țepeș	Sava	
1979	Drumuri în cumpănă	Peasant	
1979	Ora zero	Miliția captain	
1980	Al treilea salt mortal	SS Colonel Lösel	
1980	Munții în flăcări	Andrei Șaguna	
1981	Șantaj	Coroner Vlase	
1981	Orgolii	Constantin Redman	
1983	Plecarea Vlașinilor	Nicolae Branga	
1984	Prea cald pentru luna mai	Vlad Berindei	
1984	Întoarcerea Vlașinilor	Nicolae Branga	
1985	The Last Assault	Soviet general	
1986	Vară sentimentală	Party functionary	
1986	Trenul de aur	Grigore Gafencu	
1986	The Graduates	Șerban's father	
1987	Pădurea de fagi	Romanian colonel	
1987	François Villon – Poetul vagabond	Thibaut d’Aussigny	
1988	Niște băieți grozavi	Buzescu	
1989	Mircea	Ene Udobă	
1993	Oglinda	Attorney Enescu	
1995	State of Things	Maxențiu's father	
1999	Triunghiul morții	Henri Mathias Berthelot	
