= Colea Răutu =

Romanian actor

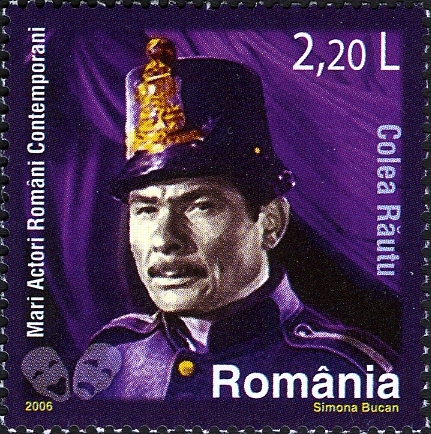
- Born: Nikolai Rutkovski; 28 November 1912; Beltsy, Bessarabia Governorate, Russian Empire (now Bălți, Republic of Moldova)
- Died: 13 May 2008 (aged 95); Bucharest, Romania
- Resting place: Bellu Cemetery, Bucharest
- Occupations: Stage and screen actor
- Years active: 1955–1993
- Spouses: Geta Enacovici; Magda Răutu
- Children: Irina Răutu-Munteanu
- Awards: Order of the Star of Romania, Knight rank

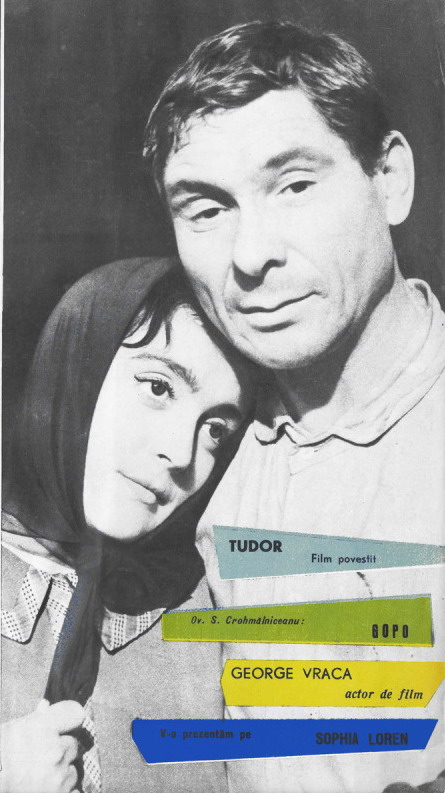
Lica Gheorghiu and Răutu in Lupeni 29

Colea Răutu (Romanian pronunciation: [ˈkole̯a rəˈutu]; 18 November 1912 – 13 May 2008) was a Romanian actor, born in Bălți (Russian Empire, now Republic of Moldova). He played in more than fifty movies and TV series, among other the western film Apachen, the Romanian TV series Toate pînzele sus, and the prize-winning film Răscoala.

== Selected filmography ==
- La 'Moara cu noroc' (1955) (The Mill of Good Luck). Nominated for the "Golden Palm" at the 1957 Cannes Film Festival.
- Setea (1961) (Thirst). Awarded the "Silver Prize" at the 1960 Moscow International Film Festival, and nominated for the "Grand Prix" at the same festival.
- Lupeni 29 (1962)
- Răscoala (1965) Blazing Winter or Flaming Winter or The Uprising. Won the prize for "Best First Work" at the 1966 Cannes Film Festival, and nominated for the "Golden Palm".
- Mihai Viteazul (1970) (Last Crusade) Nominated for the Golden Prize at the 7th Moscow International Film Festival.
- Apachen (1973)
- Explozia (1973) (The Poseidon Explosion) Nominated for the Golden Prize at the 8th Moscow International Film Festival.
- Ultimul cartuș (1973)
- Ulzana (1974)
- Toate pînzele sus (1976)
- Accident (1976)
- Mihail, câine de circ (1979)
- Duelul (1981) (The Duel): Nominated as "Best film" for the 1982 Mystfest festival (International Mystery Film Festival of Cattolica).
- The Last Assault (1985)
- Mircea (1989)
- Iubire ca-n filme (2006) – Bogdan's father
