= Amza Pellea =

Romanian actor (1931-1983)

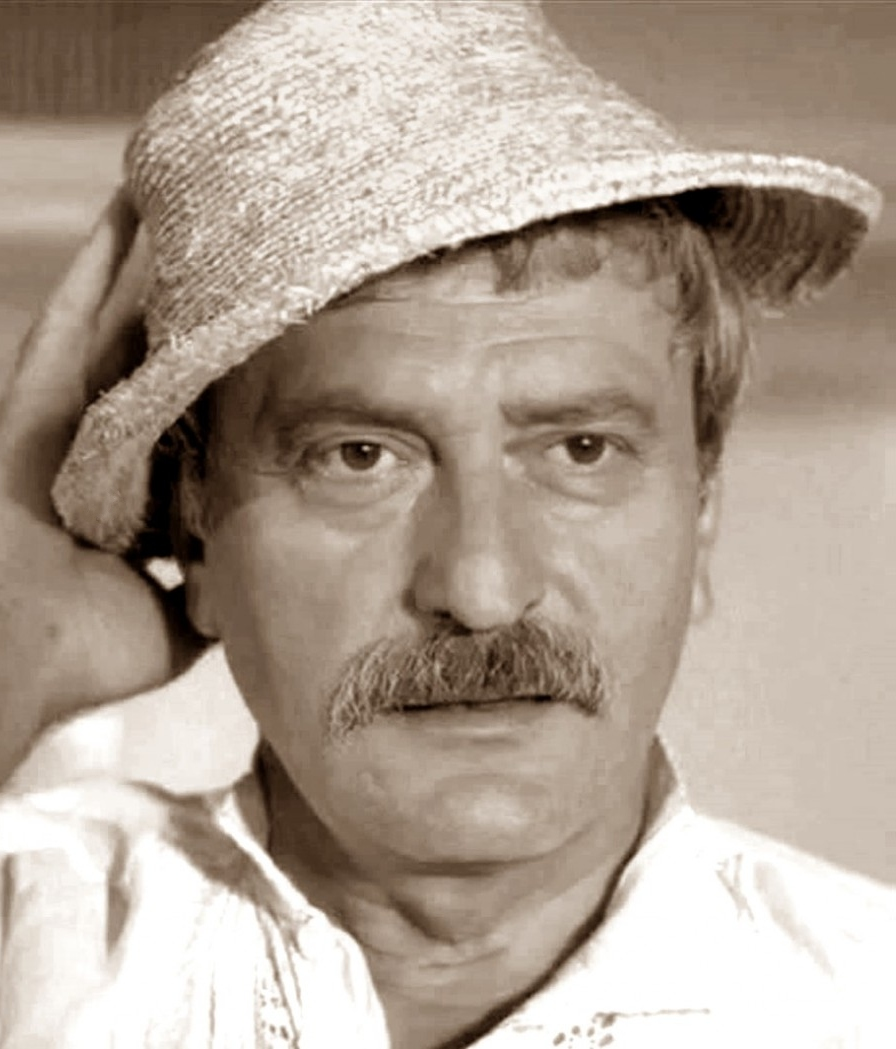
- Born: 7 April 1931; Băilești, Dolj County, Kingdom of Romania
- Died: 12 December 1983 (aged 52); Bucharest, Socialist Republic of Romania
- Resting place: Bellu Cemetery, Bucharest
- Occupation: Actor
- Years active: 1955–1983
- Spouse: Domnica Mihaela Pellea
- Children: Oana Pellea

Amza Pellea (Romanian pronunciation: [ˈamza ˈpele̯a]; 7 April 1931 – 12 December 1983) was a Romanian actor noted for playing Romanian national heroes on film.

He was born in Băilești, Oltenia, and attended the Carol I High School in Craiova. He later played at the Craiova Theatre, then at the Small Theatre, the Nottara Theatre, the Comedy Theatre, and the National Theatre in Bucharest, and also was a professor at the Academy of Theatre and Film in Bucharest.

Pellea played numerous comic and serious roles. In cinema he was most noted for his roles portraying historical leaders. His earliest leading roles were as Romanian national heroes, beginning with Decebalus in Dacii (1967) and Columna (1968). He also portrayed Michael the Brave in Mihai Viteazul (1971).

His most famous comic role was as "Nea Mărin" (Uncle Marin), a character representing the archetypal Oltenian peasant. Mărin first appeared in TV comedy sketches. The character graduated to the cinema in Nea Mărin miliardar (Uncle Marin, the Billionaire), in which Pellea played the dual role of the naive Marin and the American billionaire he is mistaken for. Nea Mărin miliardar is ranked 1 in the top most viewed Romanian films of all time.

He played other historical figures such as Vladică Hariton in Tudor din Vladimiri and Voivode Basarab in Croitorii cei mari din Valahia. He also appeared in Răscoala and Haiducii. In 1977 he won the award for Best Actor at the 10th Moscow International Film Festival for his role in The Doom.

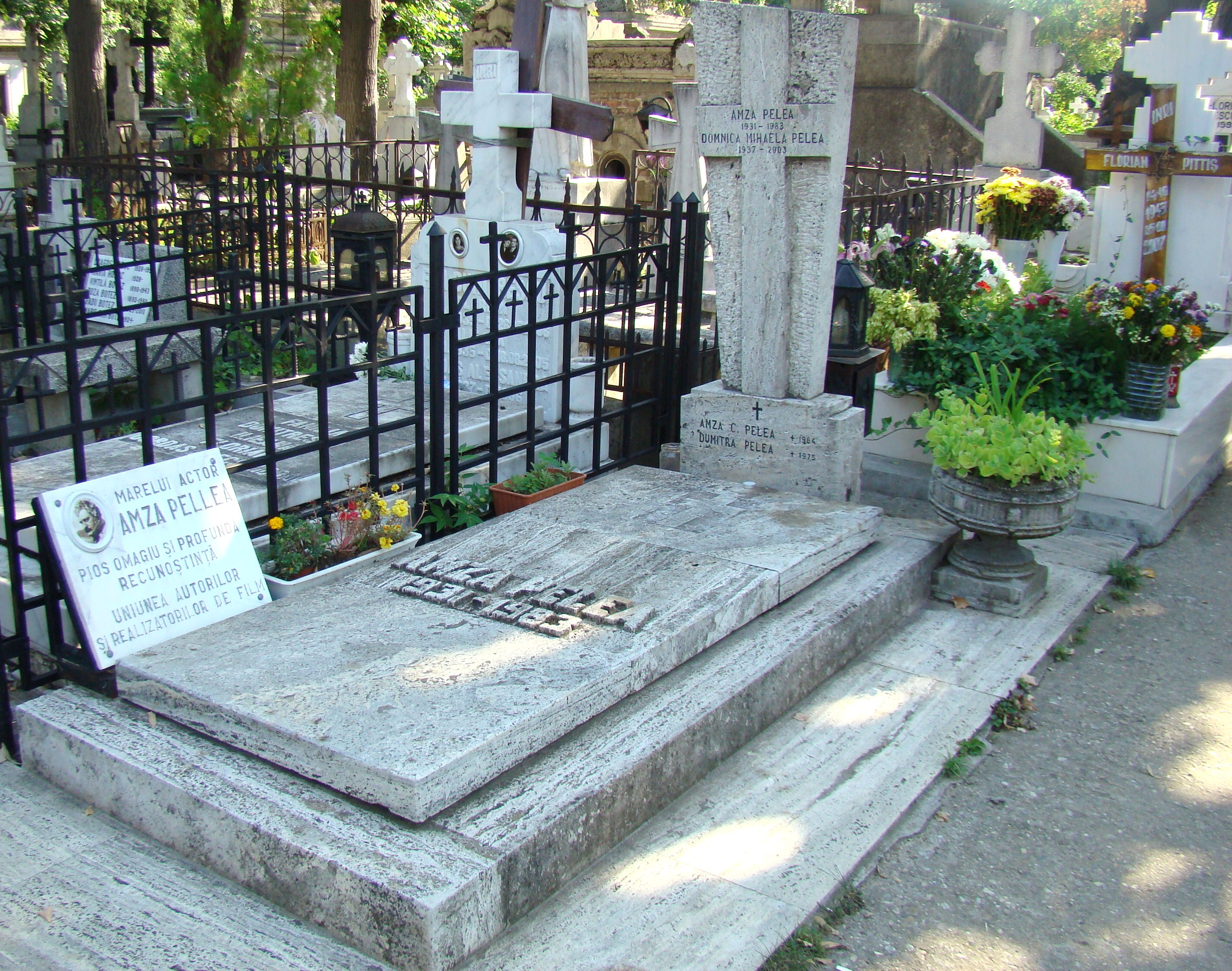
Amza Pellea's tomb at Bellu Cemetery

He died of cancer in 1983 and is buried at Bellu Cemetery in Bucharest. He was married for 25 years to Domnica Mihaela Policrat, and had a daughter named Oana Pellea who became an actress.

In a 2006 poll conducted by Romanian Television to identify the "100 greatest Romanians of all time", Pellea came in 60th.

== Selected filmography ==
- Thirst (1961)
- Dacii (1967)
- The Column (1968)
- Mihai Viteazul (1971)
- Then I Sentenced Them All to Death (1972)
- The Last Cartridge (1973)
- A Police Superintendent Accuses (1973)
- Ulzana (1974)
- Tată de duminică (1975)
- The Doom (1976)
- Mihail, câine de circ (1979)
- Nea Mărin miliardar (1979)
- Capcana mercenarilor (1981)
