= Ion Besoiu =

Romanian actor

Ion Besoiu Grand Cross and Sash ranks of the Order of the Star of Romania
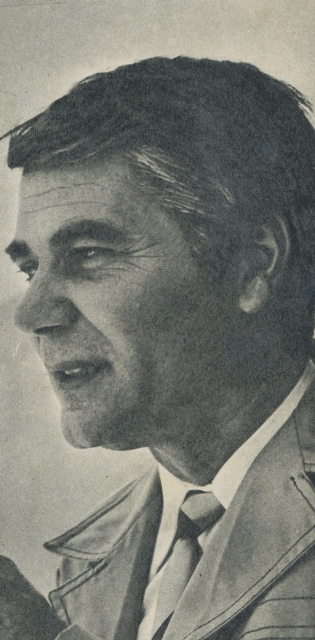
- Born: 11 March 1931; Sibiu, Kingdom of Romania
- Died: 18 January 2017 (aged 85); Bucharest, Romania
- Resting place: Bellu Cemetery, Bucharest
- Occupation: Actor
- Years active: 1957–2009
- Spouse: Emilia Dobrin
- Children: Ioana Besoiu

Ion Besoiu (Romanian pronunciation: [iˈon beˈsoju]; 11 March 1931 – 18 January 2017) was a Romanian actor.

== Biography ==
He was born in Sibiu in 1931 and graduated the city's Theater and Music Academy. After making his debut in 1957, he played for 16 years at the Radu Stanca National Theatre in Sibiu. He then moved to Bucharest, where he played at the Bulandra Theatre. He later served for 12 years as director of this well-known theatre.

Besoiu appeared in some of the most important Romanian films from the Communist period: "Furtuna", "Neamul Șoimăreștilor", "Haiducii", "Răscoala", "Mihai Viteazul", "Ciprian Porumbescu", "Păcală", "Blestemul pământului, blestemul iubirii", "Ultima noapte de dragoste", "Lumini și umbre", "Ce neagră e mama", and "Toate pânzele sus!".

He died at Fundeni Hospital in Bucharest in 2017; he is buried at the city's Bellu Cemetery.

He was also chosen by Disney to provide the Romanian voice of a character in the animated series – Darwing Duck.

== Selected filmography ==
- Thirst (1961)
- Haiducii (1966)
- Michael the Brave (1970)
- The Actor and the Savages (1975)
- Toate pînzele sus (1976–1978) - Anton Lupan
- Mihail, câine de circ (1979)
- The Last Assault (1985)
- The Silver Mask (1985) - Gheorghe Bibescu
- Lombarzilor 8 (2006)
- Cu un pas inainte (2007) - Tudor Avramescu
- Inimă de țigan (2007) - Vasile Dumbravă
- Poveste de cartier (2008) - Nea' Petrică
- Regina (2009), Don Tito
- Loverboy (2011)
- Pariu cu viața (2012) - Bubu's father
- Bucharest Non Stop (2015)

== Awards ==
- In 2001 he was awarded the Order of the Star of Romania, Knight rank, by President Ion Iliescu.
- In 2001 he was declared Citizen of Honour of Sibiu.
- In 2002 he received the Excellency Prize of Romanian Cinematography.
- In 2011 he received the Gopo Prize for Lifetime Achievement.
