= Winterberg (disambiguation) =

Winterberg is a town in North Rhine-Westphalia, Germany.

Winterberg may also refer to:

== Places ==
- Winterberg (Eastern Cape), mountain range in South Africa
- Winterberg, Switzerland
- Winterberg tunnel, Craonne, France
- Winterberg, mountains in Saxony, Germany:
  - Großer Winterberg
  - Kleiner Winterberg (Saxon Switzerland)
- Winterberg, mountains in Saxony-Anhalt, Germany:
  - Großer Winterberg (Harz)
  - Kleiner Winterberg (Harz)
- Vimperk (German: Winterberg), a town in Czech Republic

== People ==
- Friedwardt Winterberg (born 1929), German-American physicist and professor
- Guido Winterberg (born 1962), Swiss cyclist
- Hans Winterberg (1901–1991), Czech-German composer
- Lukas Winterberg (born 1988), Swiss cyclo-cross cyclist
- Olga Winterberg (1922–2010), Israeli athlete
- Philipp Winterberg, German author

== Other ==
- Winterberg Commando, a former infantry regiment of the South African Army

== See also ==
- Winterburg
- Wintersberg (disambiguation)
- Wintersbourg
- Wintersburg (disambiguation)
