= Franț Țandără =

Franț Țandără (22 February 1930, Izbiceni, Olt County – 2 May 2004, Giurgiu) was a Romanian communist and self-described torturer.

Țandără was born into a poor and dysfunctional family. Abandoned by both parents, he became an army ward at age 11. After the end of World War II he led a vagrant life, before becoming in 1946 a sympathizer of the Romanian Communist Party in Giurgiu. According to his account from an interview, he curried favor with Pavel Ștefan, a local communist boss, who found work for him at Căile Ferate Române. After a dispute with his father, though, Țandără killed his father with an axe; he was apprehended and sentenced to 12 years hard labor.

Țandără spent several years doing forced labor at the Danube–Black Sea Canal, and served as an informant to the communist authorities in the re-education camps there. After being transferred to Culmea, he was sent in August 1951 to Psychiatric Hospital no. 9 in Bucharest, where he became employed by the Securitate to assist in the torture and killing of political prisoners. He was released early, upon receiving a presidential pardon he said was signed by writer Mihail Sadoveanu (the nominal head of state in early 1958). After his release he worked as a carpenter and a beekeeper.

According to his own declarations, Țandără tortured and killed more than 100 persons, and enjoyed doing this, stating, "I hated the bourgeoisie at the maximum. I wanted to kill them all". His confessions, where he asked to be judged by a tribunal of his victims, are the subject of the 1999 book The Road to Damascus: Confession of a former torturer by Doina Jela. In a review of the book, literary critic Virgil Ierunca wrote: "The torturer of the Securitate, Franț Țandără, describes the tortures in which he had specialized, takes his share of the blame, implicates the communist system in charge of the horror, and above all (here the uniqueness is indisputable), asks to be tried in a country which, after ten years of transition, has not yet found judges and a tribunal".

According to Variety, out of the estimated 1,700 Romanians whose mission under the Communist regime was torturing political prisoners, Țandără was the only one who felt a need to confess. He died in 2004 in Giurgiu, without ever having faced prosecution for the crimes he confessed to.

His story is presented in The Afternoon of a Torturer, a 2001 Romanian biography film directed by Lucian Pintilie based on Jela's book and starring Gheorghe Dinică in the role of Țandără. The story was revisited in a play staged in 2022 at Teatrul Dramaturgilor Români in Bucharest, with Răzvan Vasilescu as Țandără and Maia Morgenstern as Jela.
