= Gheorghe Dinică =

Romanian actor

Gheorghe Dinică Grand Cross and Sash ranks of the National Order of Faithful Service
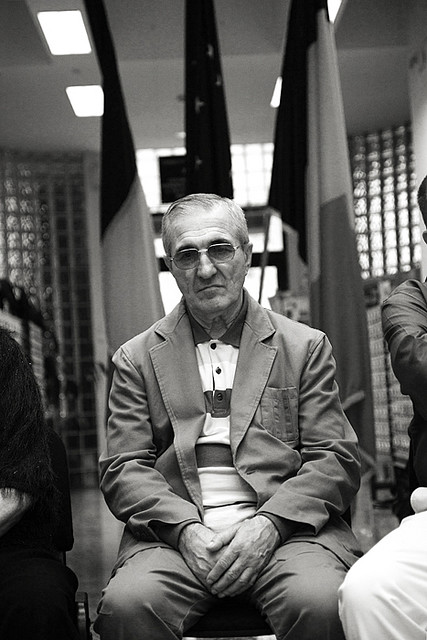
- Gheorghe Dinică in 2008.
- Born: Gheorghe Dinică; 1 January 1934; Bucharest, Romania
- Died: 10 November 2009 (aged 75); Bucharest, Romania
- Occupations: Actor, music
- Years active: 1963–2009
- Spouse: Gabriela Georgeta Dinică (1996–2009) (his death)

Gheorghe Dinică (Romanian pronunciation: [ˈɡe̯orɡe diˈnikə]; 1 January 1934 – 10 November 2009) was a Romanian actor.

== Career ==
Dinică showed an early interest in acting, being part of different amateur theater troupes since he was 17. In 1957, he entered The National Institute of Theatre and Cinematography Art in Bucharest. He graduated in 1961, already drawing public attention with the role of Inspector Goole in the graduation play An Inspector Calls. Since then, Gheorghe Dinică performed for some of the most important Romanian theatres:

- 1961-1967 Comedy Theatre, Bucharest
- 1968-1969 Bulandra Theatre, Bucharest
- since 1972 I.L.Caragiale National Theatre, Bucharest

Dinică was a Romanian director and popular film actor, thus acting mostly in Romanian films. Like the French actor Alain Delon, Dinică refused to act in movies produced in the United States.

Since 2002, Dinică was an honorary member of the society of I.L.Caragiale National Theatre. He is also an honorary citizen of the city of Bucharest. He was awarded the "Faithful Service" Order in the Grand Officer class.

Dinica died of cardiac arrest at Floreasca Emergency Hospital, Bucharest. For his popularity in Romania, he received an offer from Walt Disney Pictures, and provided the voice of Scrooge McDuck in 1996 for the Romanian version of the series, Duck Tales.

== Activity ==
=== Theatre ===
- 1961: Famous 702 directed by M.Ghelerter
- 1962: Sweik in the Second World War by B.Brecht, directed by L.Giurchescu
- 1962: The Trial of Mr. Caragiale by M.Ștefănescu, directed by D.Esrig
- 1962: Wedding at the Castle by S.Andras, directed by L.Giurchescu
- 1963: The Shadow by E.Svarț, directed by D.Esrig
- 1964: Rhinoceros by Eugène Ionesco, directed by L.Giurchescu
- 1964: The Sleepy Adventure by T.Mazilu, directed by D.Cernescu
- 1965: Troilus and Cressida by William Shakespeare, directed by D.Esrig
- 1966: The Duck Head by G.Ciprian, directed by D.Esrig
- 1967: Public Opinion by Aurel Baranga, directed by A.Baranga
- 1968: Rameau's Nephew by Denis Diderot directed by D.Esrig
- 1969: Death of Danton by Georg Büchner directed by Liviu Ciulei
- 1973: Three Venetian Twins directed by David Esrig
- 1977: Romulus the Great by Friedrich Dürrenmatt, directed by Sanda Manu
- 1978: Gaițele, directed by Horea Popescu
- 1979: A Lost Letter by Ion Luca Caragiale, directed by Radu Beligan
- 1980: Waiting for Godot by Samuel Beckett, directed by Grigore Gonţa
- 1986: Ioneștii directed by Grigore Gonţa
- 1990: Who Needs Theatre? directed by Andrei Şerban
- 1991: Night of Kings by William Shakespeare, directed by Andrei Şerban
- 1997: Technic of Heaven by Mihai Ispirescu, directed by Dan Micu
- 1998: Night Asilum by Maxim Gorki, directed by Ion Cojar
- 1999: The Name of the Rose adapted from Umberto Eco, directed by Grigore Gonţa
- 1999: Pork Chops by Bertrand Blier, directed by Gelu Colceag
- 2000: And Relieve Eminescu Already by Tiberiu Cristian Popescu, directed by Grigore Gonţa
- 2001: Take, Ianke and Cadâr by V.I.Popa, directed by Grigore Gonța
- 2003: The Last Hour by Mihail Sebastian, directed by Anca Ovanez Doroşenco

=== Filmography ===
- 1963: The Stranger (directed by Mihai Iacob) as Jurca
- 1964: The Treasure from Vadul Vechi (directed by Victor Iliu) as Zamfir
- 1966: The White Trial (directed by Iulian Mihu) as Vasile Dumitrana
- 1966: Golgota (directed by regia Mircea Drăgan) as Sergentul
- 1966: Dacii (directed by Sergiu Nicolaescu) as Roman Gen. Fuscus (voice)
- 1967: The Major and Death (directed by Alexandru Boiangiu) as Maiorul Tache
- 1968: The Column (directed by Mircea Drăgan) as Bastus - Dacian Traitor
- 1969: Neînfricatii (directed by Iulian Mihu)
- 1970: Judgement (directed by Ferenc Kósa)
- 1970: Prea mic pentru un razboi atît de mare (directed by Radu Gabrea) as Plutonierul veteran
- 1972: Atunci i-am condamnat pe toţi la moarte (directed by Sergiu Nicolaescu) as Notar
- 1972: With Clean Hands (directed by Sergiu Nicolaescu) as Lascarica
- 1972: The Barrier (directed by Mircea Mureşan) as pungasul Ionel Calaretu
- 1972: Felix and Otilia (directed by Iulian Mihu) as Stanica Ratiu
- 1973: Explosion (directed by Mircea Drăgan) as Salamander
- 1974: Beyond the Sands (directed by Radu Gabrea) as maiorul Ionescu
- 1974: Un comisar acuză (directed by Sergiu Nicolaescu) as Paraipan
- 1974: The Jderi Brothers (directed by Mircea Drăgan) as Dumitru Crivat
- 1974: The Prodigal Father (directed by Adrian Petringenaru) as Marin
- 1974: Nemuritorii (directed by Sergiu Nicolaescu) as Postelnicul Butnaru
- 1974: We Do Not Film Just for Fun (directed by Iulian Mihu)
- 1975: Stephen the Great - Vaslui 1475 (directed by Mircea Drăgan) - Sultan Mahomed II
- 1975: Filip the Kind (directed by Dan Piţa) - Lupu
- 1975: Postcards with Wild Flowers (directed by Andrei Blaier) as Marin, responsabil de la Alimentara
- 1975: Escape (directed by Ştefan Traian Roman) as Capitanul Stoian
- 1975: Mastodont (directed by Virgil Calotescu) as Ilarie Micu
- 1975: The Wall (directed by Constantin Vaeni) as ilegalistul Savu
- 1976: Through the Ashes of the Empire (directed by A.Blaier) as escrocul Diplomatul
- 1976: The Doom (directed by Sergiu Nicolaescu) as Gendarme Chief Ion
- 1976: Three Days and Three Nights (directed by Dinu Tănase)
- 1976: Oil! (directed by Mircea Drăgan) as George
- 1976: Opening (directed by Mihai Constantinescu)
- 1977: The Great Loner (directed by Iulian Mihu)
- 1977: Stairway to the Sky (directed by A.Blaier) as Vitcu
- 1978: "Bus" Action (directed by Virgil Calotescu) as Armand the Baron
- 1978: Doctor Poenaru (directed by Dinu Tănase) as Judecatorul Mircea Voican
- 1978: Revenge (directed by Sergiu Nicolaescu) as Paraipan
- 1978: Uncertain Roads (directed by Virgil Calotescu) as Onisor Borcea
- 1978: Everything for Football (directed by A.Blaier)
- 1979: Poor Ioanide (directed by Dan Piţa) as Gonzalv Ionescu
- 1980: Last Night of Love (directed by Sergiu Nicolaescu) as Constantin Mavrodin
- 1980: Network S (directed by Virgil Calotescu) as spionul Eugen Panait
- 1981: A World with no Sky (directed by Mircea Drăgan) as Sergentul
- 1982: Intîlnirea (directed by Sergiu Nicolaescu)
- 1982: The Contest (directed by Dan Piţa) as Mitica
- 1982: White Darkness (directed by Andrei Blaier) as Arbitru strain de fotbal
- 1982: Why Are the Bells Ringing, Mitica? (directed by Lucian Pintilie) as Nae
- 1983: Laugh as in Life (directed by A.Blaier) as Inginerul sef
- 1983: On the Left Bank of Blue Danube (directed by Malvina Urşianu) as majordomul Matei
- 1984: The Secret of Bacchus (directed by G.Saizescu) as Cercel
- 1984: Dangerous Flight (directed by Francisc Munteanu) as Oprescu
- 1984: A light on the 10th Floor (directed by Malvina Urşianu) as Avocat Mitrana
- 1984: Acordati circumstante atenuante? (directed by Lucian Bratu)
- 1984: A Patch of Sky (directed by Francisc Munteanu)
- 1984: Heroes Have No Age (TV Movie, directed by Mihai Constantinescu)
- 1984: Ciresarii (directed by Adrian Petringenaru)
- 1985: Sentimental Summer (directed by Francisc Munteanu) as Coman, presedintele C.A.P.-ului Viitorul
- 1987: The Wasps Nest (directed by Horia Popescu) as Georges
- 1987: The Secret of Nemesis (directed by G.Saizescu) as N. M. Sisescu
- 1987: Let Me Tell You About Me (directed by Mihai Constantinescu)
- 1987: The Extras (directed by Malvina Urşianu)
- 1989: Moment of Truth (directed by A.Blaier)
- 1989: Sky's Tear (directed by A.Istrătescu Lener)
- 1989: Divorce out of Love (directed by A.Blaier)
- 1991: Divort... din dragoste (directed by A.Blaier) as Lawyer
- 1991: The House from the Dream (directed by Ioan Cărmăzan) as Cäpäläu
- 1993: The Conjugal Bed (directed by Mircea Daneliuc) as Vasile Potop
- 1993: High School Students in Alert (directed by Mircea Plângău) as Patron magazin
- 1993: Look Ahead in Anger (directed by Nicolae Mărgineanu) as Dimos
- 1993: The Earth's Most Beloved Son (directed by Şerban Marinescu) as investigator of the Securitate
- 1994: Chira Chiralina (directed by Gyula Maar) as Apa
- 1994: The Mirror (directed by Sergiu Nicolaescu) as Mihai Antonescu
- 1994: The Stone Cross (directed by A.Blaier) as Mache Puzderie
- 1995: Terente – King of the Swamps (directed by A.Blaier)
- 1995: The Idle Princess of the Old Court (directed by Mircea Veroiu) as Maiorica Arnoteanu
- 1999: The Famous Paparazzo (directed by Nicolae Mărgineanu) as Procurorul
- 2000: Manipularea (directed by Nicolae Opritescu)
- 2001: War in the Kitchen (directed by Marius Theodor Barna)
- 2001: The Afternoon of a Torturer (directed by Lucian Pintilie) as Frant Tandara
- 2002: Patul lui Procust (directed by Viorica Meșină, Sergiu Prodan) as Nae Gheorghidiu
- 2002: Filantropica (directed by Nae Caranfil) as Pavel Puiut
- 2002: The Tower of Pisa (directed by Şerban Marinescu)
- 2003: Exam (directed by Titus Muntean) as Dumitrascu
- 2003: Sweet Sauna of Death (directed by Andrei Blaier) as Lama
- 2004: Orient Express (directed by Sergiu Nicolaescu) as Costache
- 2004: Tycoon (directed by Şerban Marinescu) as Gheorghe Manasia
- 2004: The Manipulation (directed by Marius Theodor Barna)
- 2004: Emperor Aleodor (directed by Radu Dumitru Penescu) as Bondar (voice)
- 2005: Un om grabit (L' Homme press) (TV Movie, directed by Sebastien Grall) as Zacharie Regencrantz
- 2005: Bani de dus, bani de-ntors (TV Movie, directed by Alexandru Tocilescu) as Manole
- 2005: Orbirea voluntara (directed by Marian Baciu)
- 2006: White Palms (directed by Szabolcs Hajdu) as Zacharie Regencrantz
- 2007: Ticalosii (directed by Serban Marinescu) as Recycled Securist
- 2007: Inima de tigan (TV Series, directed by Aurica Fieraru) as Aurică Fieraru
- 2008: Regina (TV Series, directed by Larry Maronese, Iura Luncasu, Alex Fotea) as Aurica Fieraru (2008-2009)
- 2009: Weekend with my Mother (directed by Stere Gulea) as Grandfather
- 2009: The House of Terror (directed by Peter Engert)
- 2009: Aniela (directed by Iura Luncasu, Bogdan Dumitrescu) as Gen. Vulturescu (2009-2010)
- 2015: Soapte de amor (directed by Mircea Daneliuc) as Doctor (final film role)
