= Explosion (1973 film) =

1973 film

- Directed by: Mircea Drăgan
- Written by: Ioan Grigorescu
- Starring: Radu Beligan
- Cinematography: Nicolae Margineanu
- Release date: July 1973
- Running time: 112 minutes
- Country: Romania
- Language: Romanian

Explosion (Romanian: Explozia) is a 1973 Romanian drama film directed by Mircea Drăgan. It was entered into the 8th Moscow International Film Festival where it won a Diploma.

== Plot ==
After a distress call a harbor master's motor boat of the port of Galați discovers the Panamanian-flagged freighter Poseidon on fire and abandoned on the Danube, aboard which is a highly dangerous cargo of 4,000 tons of nitrogen-based fertilizer, enough to level the city and a nearby steel plant. The Mayor of Galați (Toma Dimitriu) and the Communist Party leadership headed by First Secretary Ticu Corbea (Toma Caragiu) argue over whether to evacuate the city, fearing mass panic. Meanwhile port officers, military firemen, academician Luca (Radu Beligan), four volunteers from a wedding including oil well firefighter Gică "Salamander" Oprișan (Gheorghe Dinică), and shipyard welder Gore Damian (Vasile Boghiță) struggle to keep the ship from exploding. One of the Poseidon's crew, a blonde stowaway, and a gang of looters complicate matters.

== Production ==
The film's plot is a dramatized depiction of a real event that took place on January 10, 1971, the fire and sinking of the Greek freighter S.S. Vrachos aboard which 3,700 tons of ammonium nitrate were loaded and threatened to destroy the city Galați. Screenwriter Ioan Grigorescu completed his script, initially titled "P", by the end of 1971 and production started by the spring of 1972. The gutted hulk of the Vrachos was used as the primary set for the film and was set ablaze again and towed past the Galați waterfront during filming. Almost all the stunts in the film were performed by the actors.

== Release ==
The film was successful enough for Drăgan to film a loose sequel featuring Dinică and Beligan reprising their roles. Cuibul salamandrelor (1977), set in the Maghreb, was produced with Italian assistance and an international cast including Ray Milland, Woody Strode, and Stuart Whitman.

== Cast ==
- Radu Beligan as Professor Luca
- Gheorghe Dinică as Gică "Salamandră" Oprișan
- Toma Caragiu as Ticu Corbea
- Dem Rădulescu as Lt. Neagu
- Jean Constantin as Tilica
- George Motoi as Lt. Cmdr. Marinescu
- Toma Dimitriu as Mayor Ioanide
- Colea Răutu as Port Commandant Anghel
- Draga Olteanu Matei as Angela Oprișan (as Draga Olteanu-Matei)
- Mircea Bașta as Firefighter Colonel Coman
