= Wintersburg (disambiguation) =

Wintersburg may refer to:

- Wintersburg, Arizona, an unincorporated community in Maricopa County, Arizona, U.S.
- Wintersburg Village, California, a historic Japanese site in Huntington Beach, California

== See also ==
- Winterberg (disambiguation)
- Winterburg
- Wintersberg (disambiguation)
- Wintersbourg
