= Ancient language =

Language originated in times that may be referred to as ancient

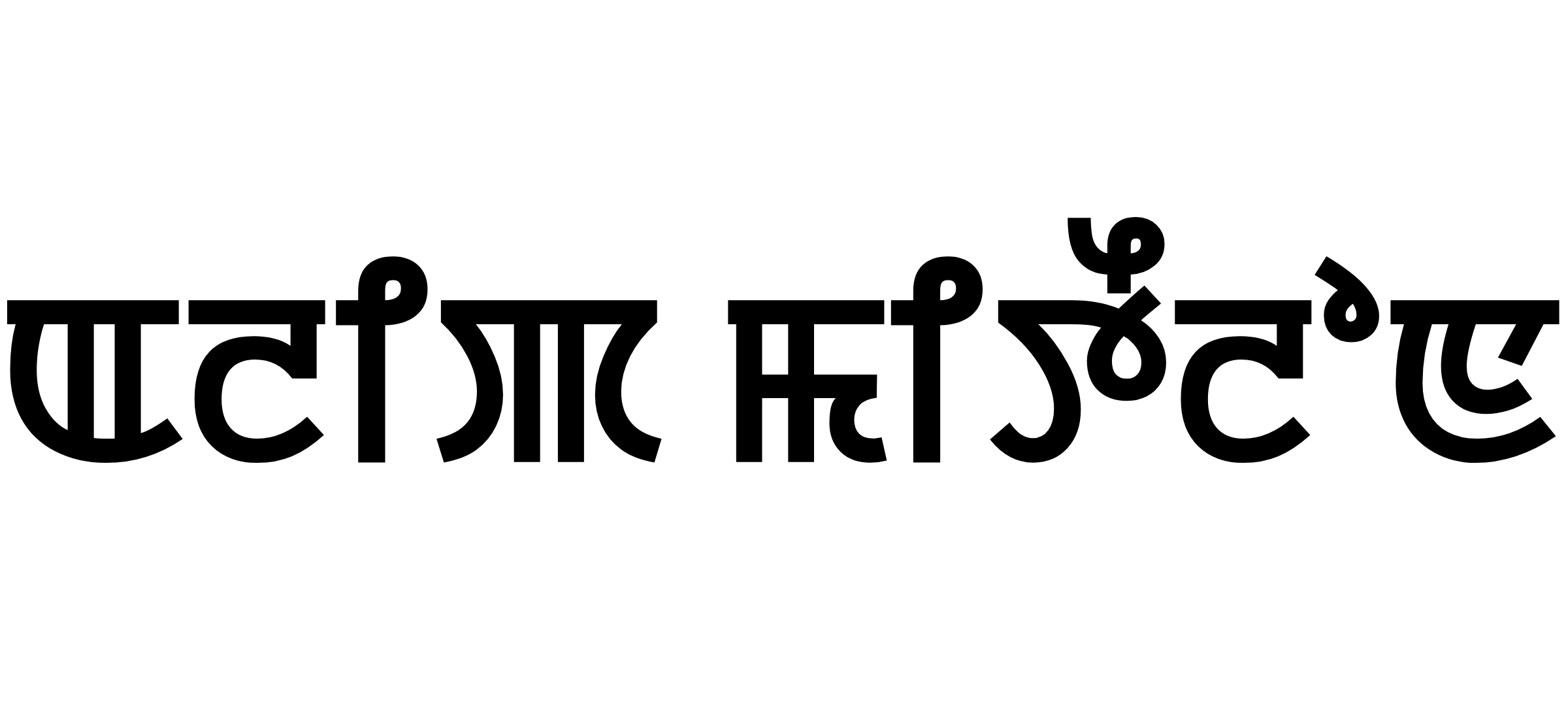
Ancient Meetei language written in Meetei script

An ancient language is any language originating in times that may be referred to as ancient. There are no formal criteria for deeming a language ancient, but a traditional convention is to demarcate as "ancient" those languages that existed prior to the 5th century. Linguist Roger Woodward has said that "[p]erhaps, then, what makes an ancient language different is our awareness that it has outlived those for whom it was an intimate element of the psyche".

By this definition, the term includes languages attested from ancient times in the list of languages by first written accounts, and described in historical linguistics, and particularly the languages of classical antiquity, such as Ancient Greek and Latin. The term may include some extinct languages.

== Popular culture ==
The description of fictional races and realms having their own "ancient languages" adds depth and richness to storytelling, even if the vocabulary and grammar of the languages themselves is never provided. Examples of this include a fictional language in The Inheritance Cycle young-adult novels, the language of the race called Ancients in the Mythology of Stargate, and various languages in writings by J. R. R. Tolkien.

== See also ==
- Classical language
- List of modern literature translated into dead languages
