= Wintersberg =

Wintersberg can refer to:

- Wintersberg (Spessart), hill in Hesse, Germany
- Grand Wintersberg, hill in the North Vosges, Alsace, France
- Wintersberg, village in Wunsiedel, Germany
- Wintersberg, village in Aegidienberg, Bad Honnef, Germany

== See also ==
- Winterberg (disambiguation)
- Winterburg
- Wintersbourg
- Wintersburg (disambiguation)
