= List of recent original works in Ancient Greek =

Authors occasionally do produce original writings in Ancient Greek today. This page lists contemporary or recent (from the 17th-21st centuries) books, essays or other texts originally written in Ancient Greek.

This page does not include works in Katharevousa Greek or translations of pre-existing literature.

== Fiction ==
=== Literary fiction ===
| Greek Title | English Title | Author | Publisher | Date | ISBN | URL | Archive, transcription or e-book | Description |
|---|---|---|---|---|---|---|---|---|
| Ποιητοῦ ἀδήλου ΑΣΤΡΟΝΑΥΤΙΛΙΑ ἢ ἡ Μικροοδυσσεία ἡ κοσμική | Astronautilia or An Unknown Poet's Starvoyage, or The Cosmic Micro-Odyssey | Jan Křesadlo | - | 1995 | ISBN 8023724525 | - | ASTRONAUTILIA at the Internet Archive | Postmodern "space opera" inspired by quantum physics and the Odyssey, written in Homeric Greek hexameter. |

=== Paraphrases of classical works ===
| Greek Title | English Title | Author | Publisher | Date | ISBN | URL | Archive, transcription or e-book | Description |
|---|---|---|---|---|---|---|---|---|
| Παραφρασθείς, σχολιασθείς τε καὶ ἐκδοθεὶς εἰς τόμους ἓξ Ὀδυσσείας | The Odyssey paraphrased, commented upon, and edited, in six volumes | Neophytos Doukas | - | 1835 | | - | Odyssey. Koine Greek Paraphrase Book at the Internet Archive | Parallel text of Homer's Odyssey books 1–9 with Attic prose retelling on facing pages (vol. 1 of 6) |
| Παραφρασθείς, σχολιασθείς τε καὶ ἐκδοθεὶς εἰς τόμους ἓξ Ἰλιάς | The Iliad paraphrased, commented upon, and edited, in six volumes | Neophytos Doukas | - | 1835 | | - | Anemi | Parallel text of Homer's Iliad books 1–9 with Attic prose retelling on facing pages (vol. 1 of 6) |

=== Novellas and readers for educational use ===
| Greek Title | English Title | Author | Reader level | Publisher | Date | ISBN | Description |
|---|---|---|---|---|---|---|---|
| Ἑρμῆς πάντα κλέπτει | Hermes Steals Everything | John Foulk | Beginners | John\Foulk | 2020 | ISBN 978-1735193724 | Novella intended for first-year novice readers, describing the god Hermes |
| Ἄργος | Argos: Ancient Greek Dog Stories | Jenny Teichmann | Intermediate | Argos Press | 2024 | ISBN 979-8300040925 | - |
| - | Pegasus. An Easy Ancient Greek Reader | Jenny Teichmann | Advanced Beginners | Argos Press | 2025 | ISBN 979-8294795276 | |
| Ἐρωτικοὶ μῦθοι | Love Stories in Easy Ancient Greek | Jenny Teichmann | beginning to intermediate | Argos Press | 2023 | ISBN 979-8860425170 | - |
| ΟΙΚΑΔΕ | Heliodorus’ Day | Seth Pryor | children and beginners | independent | 2024 | ISBN 979-8303800212 | - |
| - | A Greek boy at home, a story written in Greek | W. H. D. Rouse | beginners | Blackie | 1909 | - | Rouse's original Ancient Greek reader, A Greek Boy at Home |
| - | Rouse's Greek Boy: A Reader | William Henry Denham Rouse | beginners | Focus | 2024 | ISBN 978-1585103249 | Slight revision of Rouse's original Greek language reader, A Greek Boy at Home |
| - | Aléxandros: To Hellenikon Paidion | Mario Díaz Ávila | beginners | Cultura Clásica | 2023 | ISBN 978-8494534676 | Adapted from Rouse's Ancient Greek reader, A Greek Boy at Home, with color illustrations |

== Poetry ==
Armand D'Angour wrote several Ancient Greek odes in the style of Pindar, to celebrate the Olympic Games in 2004 and 2012.

== Non-fiction ==
| Greek Title | English Title | Author | Publisher | Date | ISBN | URL | Archive, transcription or e-book | Description |
|---|---|---|---|---|---|---|---|---|
| Περὶ τῆς ἑλληνικῆς γλώσσης | About the Greek language | Neophytos Doukas | - | 1840 | | - | Google books | - |
| Λογική | Logic | Eugenios Voulgaris | - | 1766 | | - | - | Treatise on logic written in a reconstructed Aristotelian/Attic Greek |

=== News ===
| Greek Title | English Title | Author | Publisher | Years Active | URL | Description |
|---|---|---|---|---|---|---|
| Τὰ νέα ἑλληνιστὶ γεγραμμένα | Akropolis World News (AKWN) | Juan Coderch | - | 2002-2026 | http://www.akwn.net/ | Long-running series of capsule news stories in Ancient Greek |

== See also ==
- Gaisford Prize for Ancient Greek Composition
- List of modern literature translated into dead languages (includes Ancient Greek)
- List of Latin translations of modern literature
- List of recent original books in Latin
