= Filipești =

- Commune
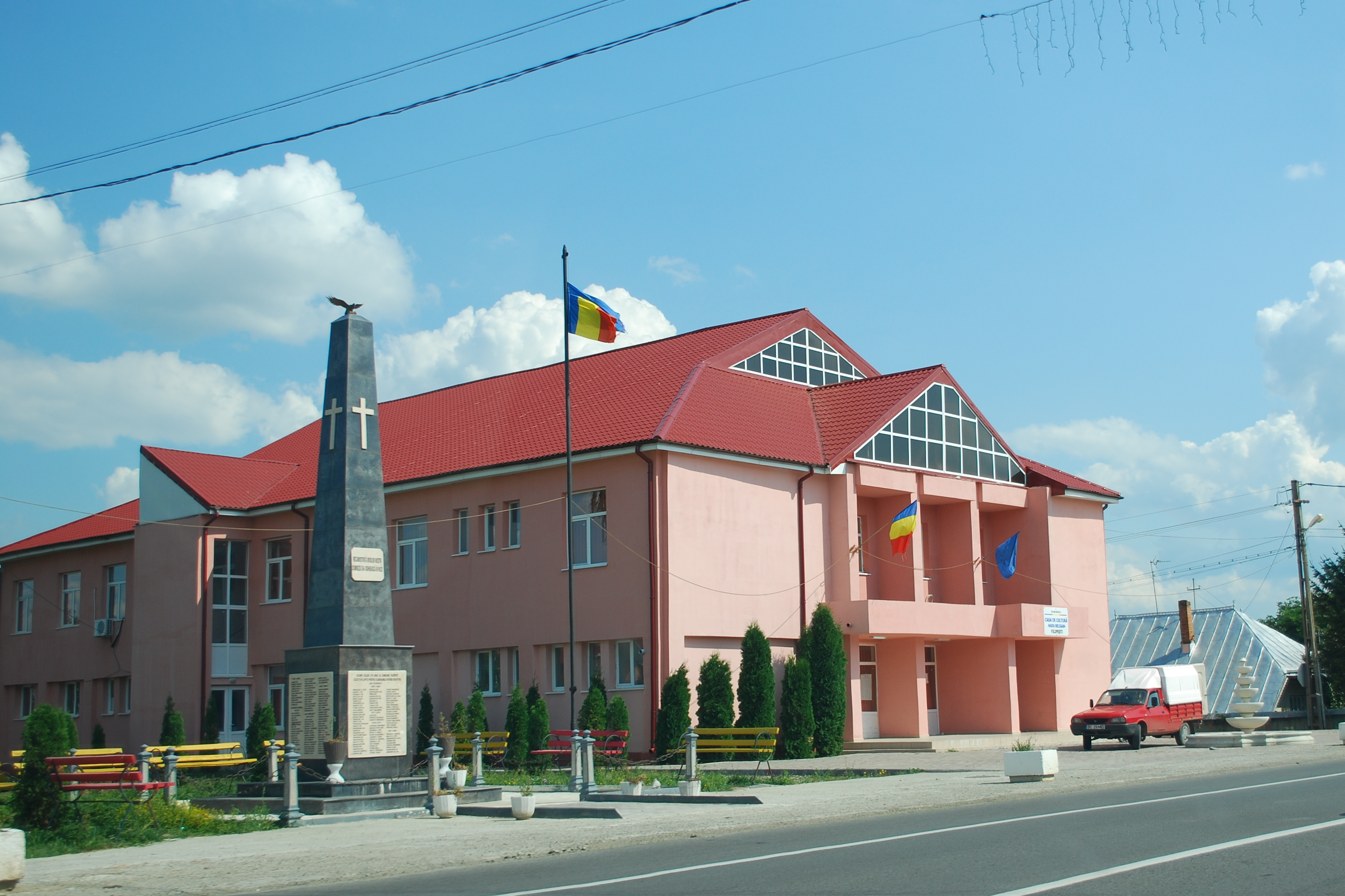
- Radu Beligan Cultural Center in Filipești

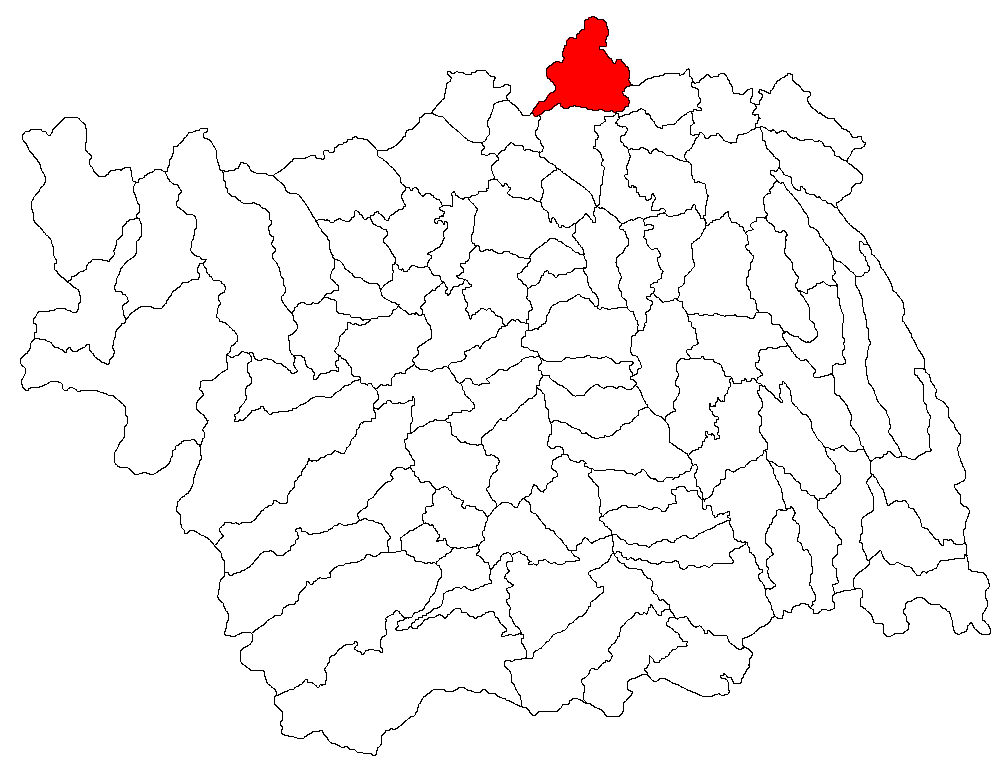
- Location in Bacău County

- Location in Romania
- Coordinates: 46.7571°N 26.8818°E
- Country: Romania
- County: Bacău

Government
  - Mayor (2024–2028): Petrică Lungu (PNL)
- Area: 68.15 km^{2} (26.31 sq mi)
- Elevation: 174 m (571 ft)
- Population (2021-12-01): 4,275
  - Density: 62.73/km^{2} (162.5/sq mi)
- Time zone: UTC+02:00 (EET)
  - Summer (DST): UTC+03:00 (EEST)
- Postal code: 607185
- Area code: +(40) 0234
- Vehicle reg.: BC
- Website: primaria-filipesti.ro

Filipești is a commune in Bacău County, Western Moldavia, Romania. It is composed of eight villages: Boanța, Cârligi, Cornești, Cotu Grosului, Filipești, Galbeni, Hârlești, and Onișcani.

== Famous landmarks ==
- In the village of Cârligi lies the Zarifopol mansion built in 1850 by Ștefan Catargiu, which is rumored to be haunted ever since its owner committed suicide inside the building. The locals refer to it as "Casa Diavolului" ("House of the Devil").

== Natives ==
- Radu Beligan (1918–2016), actor, director, and essayist
