= George Calboreanu =

Romanian actor

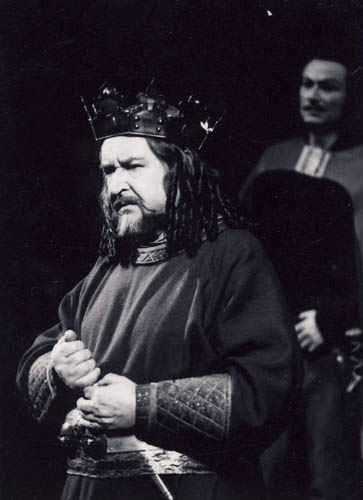
George Calboreanu

George Calboreanu (born 5 January 1896, Sibiu - 12 July 1986, Bucharest) was a Romanian actor and composer of the 20th century. He has acted in films such as Lupeni 29 and Setea.

== Biography ==
George Calboreanu was born in 1896. He began his way as an actor on stage in Iasi in 1917 - 1918 when he was a student of Illustre Actress Aglae Pruteanu. He was recognized as a professional actor in Cluj. He also received a scholarship in Vienna.

He made his national entrance in 1926 in the Vlaicu-Voda show.

In 1927, he played the role of Chirly in the Mârţagan man of George Ciprian.

In 1932, he interpreted Spirache Necşulescu in Titanic Vals by Tudor Muşatescu.

One of the great success of his career was the role of Stephen the Great in 1953.

He was awarded the Order of Class I "For special merits, for valuable achievements in art and deserving activity" in 1953 and with the Order Class I Cultural Merit "For long-term acting in the theater and special merit in the dramatic art." in 1967.

Calboreanu died on 12 July 1986 at the age of 90.

== Filmography ==
- Brigada lui Ionuț (1954)
- Bădăranii (1960) as Jupân Simon
- Setea (1960)
- Omul de lângă tine (1961)
- Lupeni 29 (1962)
- Lumina de iulie (1963)
- Străinul (1964) as Senatorul Varga
- Calea Victoriei sau cheia visurilor (1965)
- Neamul Șoimăreștilor (1965) - Moș Mihu
- Șopârla (1966)
- Legenda (1968)
- Frații (1970)
- Frații Jderi (1974) - starostele Nechifor Căliman
- Ultimele zile ale verii (1976)

== Awards ==
Title of Hero of Socialist Labour (4 May 1971) "On the occasion of the 50th anniversary of the establishment of the Romanian Communist Party, for special merits in science, art and culture".
