= List of recent original books in Latin =

Authors are still producing original books in Latin today. This page lists contemporary or recent books (from the 21st, 20th and 19th centuries) originally written in Latin. These books are not called "new" because the term Neo-Latin or New Latin refers to books written as early as the 1500s, which is "newer" than Classical Antiquity or the Middle Ages.

Translations of pre-existing modern literature are not included here.

== Fiction ==
=== Literary fiction ===
Title	Author	Reader level	Publisher	First published	ISBN	Archive, transcription or eBook
Capti: Fabula Menippeo-Hoffmanniana Americana	Stephen A Berard	Modern Latin, fluent reader	Cataracta Publications	2011	978-0991004928	
Praecursus: Fabula Neophysiologica	Stephen A Berard	Modern Latin, fluent reader	Cataracta Publications	2019	978-0991004911	
Saeculorum transvectio: narratio conficta	Genovefa Métais		Domus editoria Rainardi Brune Leichlingae	1976		

=== Fiction for educational use ===
Title	Author	Reader level	Publisher	First published	ISBN	Archive, transcription or eBook
Ad Alpes: A Tale of Roman Life	Herbert Chester Nutting	Intermediate	Scott, Foresman and Company (1923); Latinitium (2017)	1923	978-1981365739	archive.org; Wikisource
Carolus et Maria	Marjorie Fay	-	D. C. Heath and Company	1933	-	Archive.org
Cornelia	Mima Maxey	Beginner / Late beginner	University of Chicago Press	1933	-	Archive.org; Wikisource (incomplete)
Daimon: An Adventure Story for First Year Latin Students	Richard D. Case	-	Addison Wesley	1971	978-0883340950	-
Dialogues of Roman Life	S. E. Winbolt	Intermediate	G. Bell and Sons, Ltd.	1913	-	Wikimedia Commons; Wikisource
Easy Latin Stories	George L. Bennett	Intermediate	Rivingtons.	1892	-	Wikimedia Commons; Wikisource
Fabulae, virginibus puerisque aut narrandae aut recitandae	R. B. Appleton	Intermediate	G. Bell and Sons, Ltd.	1914	-	Gutenburg
Fabulae Syrae	Luigi Miraglia (Editor)	Lower Intermediate	Focus	2011	978-1585104284	-
A Latin Reader For The Lower Forms In School	H.J. Hardy	-	Macmillan & Co.	1889		archive.org
Ora maritima, a Latin story for beginners	E. A. Sonnenschein	Beginner	Swan Sonnenschein & Co.	1909		Archive.org; Wikisource
Pro patria: a Latin story for beginners	E. A. Sonnenschein	Beginner (Late)	Swan Sonnenschein & Co.	1910		Archive.org; Wikisource
Puer Romanus	R. B. Appleton and W. H. S. Jones	Intermediate	G. Bell and Sons, Ltd.	1913		Project Gutenburg

=== Novellas for Latin learners ===
Title	Author	Reader level	Publisher	First published	ISBN	Archive, transcription or eBook
Agrippīna auriga: A Latin Novella	Lance Piantaggini	Beginner	(independent)	2021	979-8579712950	-
Bellum Troianum: A Latin Novella	Brian Gronewoller	Level E	Storybase Books	2021	978-1736785904	Apple Books; Kobo
Aulus Anser: A Latin Novella (Revised Edition)	Andrew Olimpi	Level D	Storybase Books	2024	978-1963471007	Apple Books; Kobo
Caedes in Via Appia: Fabula Milonis et Clodii	Emma Vanderpool	Beginner	(independent)	2020	979-8551246107	-
Camilla: A Latin Novella (2nd ed.)	Rachel Ash	Level F	Storybase Books	2023	978-1736785980	Apple Books; Kobo
Cerberus Canis Monstruosus	Rachel Beth Cunning	Beginner	Bombax Press	2020	979-8559562780	-
Cloelia, Puella Romana	Ellie Arnold	Beginner / Late beginner	(independent)	2016	978-1533624727	Author's website, cc-by-nc-sa PDF
Cornelia	Mima Maxey	Beginner / Late beginner	University of Chicago press	1933	-	Archive.org; Wikisource
Cupido et Psyche	Rachel Beth Cunning	Beginner (Late) / Intermediate	Bombax Press	2019	978-1729079393	-
Daimon: An Adventure Story for First Year Latin Students	Richard D. Case	-	Addison Wesley	1971	978-0883340950	-
Daedalus et Icarus: A Tiered Latin Reader	Andrew Olimpi	Beginner-Intermediate	Comprehensible Classics Press	2018	978-1733005203	-
Domini Secretum	Rachel Beth Cunning	Beginner	Bombax Press	2020	979-8629036289	-
Donata et Secretum Malum: A Latin Novella	Rachel Ash	Level C	Storybase Books	2026	978-1963471885	Apple Books; Kobo
Duo Fratres: Familia Mala Vol. 2: A Latin Novella	Andrew Olimpi	Beginner	Comprehensible Classics Press	2019	978-1733005210	-
Echo et Narcissus	Rachel Ash	Level E	Storybase Books	2024	978-1963471625	Apple Books; Kobo
Ego, Polyphemus: A Latin Novella (Revised Edition)	Andrew Olimpi	Level C	Storybase Books	2024	978-1963471069	Apple Books; Kobo
Errores Longi Ulixis, Pars I: A Latin Novella	Brian Gronewoller	Level D	Storybase Books	2021	978-1736785928	Apple Books; Kobo
Errores Longi Ulixis, Pars II: A Latin Novella	Brian Gronewoller	Level D	Storybase Books	2022	978-1736785942	Apple Books; Kobo
Erucula: Fabula Metamorphosis: A Latin Novella	Rachel Beth Cunning	-	(independent)	2021	979-8713690748	-
Eumachia: Patrona Pompeiana	Emma Vanderpool	Beginner	(independent)	2020	979-8650047926	-
Familia Mala, vol. I: Saturnus et Iuppiter (Revised Edition)	Andrew Olimpi	Level C	Storybase Books	2024	978-1963471106	Apple Books; Kobo
Filia Regis et Monstrum Horribile (Revised Edition)	Andrew Olimpi	Level E	Storybase Books	2026	978-1963471847	Apple Books; Kobo
Idus Martiae: A Latin Novella (Revised Edition)	Andrew Olimpi	Level E	Storybase Books	2024	978-1963471182	Apple Books; Kobo
Incitatus: Fabula Equi Senatorii	Emma Vanderpool	Beginner	(independent)	2020	979-8638668181	-
Io Puella Fortis: A Latin Novella (Io et Tabellae Magicae and Io et Monstrum)	Andrew Olimpi	Beginner	(independent)	2020	979-8690044947	-
Ira Veneris	Rachel Beth Cunning	Beginner (Late) / Intermediate	Bombax Press	2019	978-1646332519	-
Kandake Amanirenas: Regina Nubiae	Emma Vanderpool	Beginner	(independent)	2020	979-8602567236	-
Labyrinthus: A Latin Novella	Andrew Olimpi	Beginner	(independent)	2018	978-1985727137	-
Lars Romam Odit: A Latin Novella (Revised Edition)	Andrew Olimpi	Level D	Storybase Books	2024	978-1963471021	Apple Books; Kobo
Marcus Magulus: A Latin Novella (Revised Edition)	Lance Piantaggini	Level A	Storybase Books	2024	978-1963471410	Apple Books; Kobo
Medea et Peregrinus Pulcherrimus	Rachel Beth Cunning	Beginner (Late)	Bombax Press	2020	978-1708842246	-
Melissurgus	Mr. Jessie Craft	-	(independent)	2020	978-1679400025	-
Mira Sidonis: A Latin Novella	Talia Chicherio	Level E	Storybase Books	2026	978-1963471861	Apple Books; Kobo
Olianna et Obiectum Magicum: A Latin Novella (Revised Edition)	Lance Piantaggini	Level A	Storybase Books	2024	978-1963471380	Apple Books; Kobo
Pandora: Familia Mala Volumen III: A Latin Novella	Andrew Olimpi	Beginner	Comprehensible Classics Press	2020	978-1733005227	-
Pegasus et Bellerophon	Rachel Beth Cunning	Beginner	Bombax Press	2020	979-8655695818	-
Perpetua et Felicitas: A Latin Novella	Brian Gronewoller	Level F	Storybase Books	2023	978-1736785966	Apple Books; Kobo
Perseus et Rex Malus: A Latin Novella (Puer Ex Seripho)	Andrew Olimpi	Beginner	(independent)	2017	978-1547155873	-
Perseus et Medusa: A Latin Novella (Puer Ex Seripho)	Andrew Olimpi	Beginner	(independent)	2017	978-1548787479	-
Poenica Purpuraria: A Latin Novella (Revised Edition)	Lance Piantaggini	Level B	Storybase Books	2024	978-1963471342	Apple Books; Kobo
Pugio Bruti: A Crime Story in Easy Latin	Daniel Petterson and Amelie Rosengren	Intermediate (lower)	Latinitium	2018	978-9198509403	
Ridiculi et Horribiles Dei et Deae	Rachel Beth Cunning	Beginner	Bombax Press	2020	979-8647910981	-
Rufus et Arma Atra: A Latin Novella (Revised Edition)	Lance Piantaggini	Level B	Storybase Books	2024	978-1963471328	Apple Books; Kobo
Rūfus lutulentus et Lūcia: The Latin Novella Plus 18 additional stories	Lance Piantaggini	Beginner	(independent)	2021	979-8734016381	-
Syra Sola: A Latin Novella (Revised Edition)	Lance Piantaggini	Level B	Storybase Books	2024	978-1963471366	Apple Books; Kobo
Sacri Pulli: A Tale of War and Chickens	Emma Vanderpool		(independent)	2020	978-1686669415	
signa zodiaca Vol. I: An Astrological Latin Reader	Lance Piantaggini	Beginner	(independent)	2020	979-8664444636	-
signa zodiaca Vol. II: An Astrological Latin Reader	Lance Piantaggini	Beginner	(independent)	2020	979-8679295766	-
signa zodiaca Vol. III: An Astrological Latin Reader	Lance Piantaggini	Beginner	(independent)	2020	979-8563363656	-
tres amici et monstrum saevum: A Latin Novella	Lance Piantaggini	Beginner	(independent)	2020	979-8644746606	-
Surus: Fabula Belli et Elephanti	Emma Vanderpool		(independent)	2019	979-8648057418	
Tiberius et Gallisena Ultima: A Latin Novella (Revised Edition)	Lance Piantaggini	Level E	Storybase Books	2025	978-1963471694	Apple Books; Kobo
Ubi Mors Habitat: A Latin Novella (Revised Edition)	Andrew Olimpi	Level C	Storybase Books	2025	978-1963471045	Apple Books; Kobo
Ursus Nomine Vinnius: A Latin Novella (Revised Edition)	Andrew Olimpi	Level C	Storybase Books	2025	978-1963471823	Apple Books; Kobo
Valor et Umbrae: A Latin Novella	Hilary Long	Level C	Storybase Books	2026	978-1963471908	Apple Books; Kobo
Via Periculosa: A Latin Novella	Andrew Olimpi	Beginner	(independent)	2018	978-1973955542	-
Virgo Ardens	Rachel Beth Cunning	Intermediate	Bombax Press	2020	979-8701800920	-

=== Plays for educational use ===
Title	Author	Reader level	Publisher	First published	ISBN	Archive, transcription or eBook
Cothvrnvlvs: Three short Latin historical plays for the use of beginners	Edward Vernon Arnold	Intermediate	G. Bell and Sons, Ltd.	1912		Wikimedia Commons; Wikisource
Easy Latin Plays	M.L. Newman	Beginner-Intermediate	G. Bell and Sons, Ltd.	1913	-	archive.org; Wikisource
Ólim: Ludí Scaenicí	E. Ryle	Intermediate	G. Bell and Sons, Ltd.	1914		Wikimedia Commons; Wikisource
Mostellaria (adaptation of Plautus)	Rachel Beth Cunning	Beginner (Late) / Intermediate	Bombax Press	2020	979-8673649909	-
The Mysterious Traveler: A Medieval Play about Saint Nicholas: A Tiered Latin Reader	Andrew Olimpi	Beginner-Intermediate	(independent)	2019	978-1711355900	-

== Poetry ==
Title	Author	Reader level	Publisher	Date	First published	ISBN	Archive, transcription or eBook
Les Cosmogoniales : un chant de Silène	Hyacinthus	Ancient Latin and Greek	Rue de l'échiquier		2019	978-2-37425-153-0	
Harmonica vitrea	Anna Elissa Radke	Modern Latin	-	-	1992		
Periegesis Amatoria	Geneviève Immè	Modern Latin	-	-	1991		
Carmina	Traian Lăzărescu.	Modern Latin	-	-	1972		
Incantationes	Antonius Smerdel	Modern Latin	-	-	1970		
De cicadis et undis Parentinis	Antonius Smerdel	Modern Latin	-	-	1969		
Flatus cupressorum	Antonius Smerdel	Modern Latin	-	-	1968		
Palmae solis almae	Antonius Smerdel	Modern Latin	-	-	1967		
Cantus Firmus	Johannes Alexander Gaertner.	Modern Latin	-	-	1966		
Suaviloquia	Jan Novák.	Modern Latin	-	-	1966		=
Cantilenae	Antonius Smerdel	Modern Latin	-	-	1965		
Pontes lucentes	Antonius Smerdel	Modern Latin	-	-	1962		
Pegasus Tolutarius	Henry C. Snurr aka C. Arrius Nurus.	Modern Latin	-	-	1962		
Urna Parcarum	Antonius Smerdel	Modern Latin	-	-	1961		
Vox Humana	Johannes Alexander Gaertner.	Modern Latin	-	-	1954		
Carmina Latina	A. Pinto de Carvalho.	Modern Latin	-	-	1946		
Carminum libri quattuor	Tomás Viñas.	Modern Latin	-	-	1924		

== Nonfiction ==
Title	Author	Publisher	Date	Original publication date	ISBN	Online Archive
A Life of George Washington in Latin Prose or Vita Washingtonii	Francis Glass	Wentworth Press	2019	1835	978-0526126194	Archive.org
Georgii Washingtonis Vita	William Lance	-	-	1835	-	-
Periegesis orae Rhacusanae	Georgius Ferrich	Modern Latin	-	-	1803	Google Books
Graecarum Litterarum Historia	Antonio d'Elia	Modern Latin	-	1948		
Latinarum Litterarum Historia	Antonio d'Elia			1956		
De sacerdotibus sacerdotiisque Alexandri Magni et Lagidarum eponymis	Jozef IJsewijn			1961		
Mystagogus Lycius, sive de historia linguaque Lyciorum	Wolfgang Jenniges	Modern Latin	-	1966		
Sententiæ	Alaenus Divutius	Modern Latin	-	1965		
De rationibus quibus homines docti artem Latine colloquendi et ex tempore dicendi saeculis XVI et XVII coluerunt	Terence Tunberg	Leuven University Press	-	2012	9789058679161	-
Orbis pictus latinus	Hermann Koller	Artemis & Winkler	-	2014	978-3538072688	-
De Civitate Angelorum	Donatien Grau	Yvon Lambert Editions	-	2023	978-2-913893-78-8	-
De Concordia inter Humanam et Divinam Institutionem: Quid Augustinus et Petrarca senserint	Matthaeus Mariano Costa	Independently published	-	2023	979-8398797626	

== See also ==
- Libri Latine redditi in Vicipaedia Latina (Wikipedia in Latin)
- List of Latin translations of modern literature
- List of modern literature translated into dead languages (includes Ancient Greek)
- List of recent original works in Ancient Greek
