= Premiera =

- Premiera
- Directed by: Mihai Constantinescu
- Screenplay by: Aurel Baranga
- Produced by: Sidonia Caracaș; Platon Pardău
- Starring: Carmen Stănescu; Radu Beligan; Toma Caragiu; Dem Rădulescu; Vasilica Tastaman
- Cinematography: Costache Dumitru-Fony
- Edited by: Margareta Anescu
- Music by: Temistocle Popa
- Production company: Casa de Filme 4
- Distributed by: Româniafilm
- Release date: 8 November 1976 (Romania)
- Running time: 90 min.
- Country: Romania
- Language: Romanian

Premiere is a 1976 Romanian comedy film directed by Mihai Constantinescu and starring Carmen Stănescu, Radu Beligan, Toma Caragiu, Dem Rădulescu and Vasilica Tastaman.

== Cast ==
- Carmen Stănescu as Alexandra Dan, wife of Mihai
- Radu Beligan as Mihai Dan
- Toma Caragiu as Titi Precup, actor
- Dem Rădulescu as Fanache Verzea
- Vasilica Tastaman as Veronica
- Aurel Giurumia as Boiangiu
- Carmen Galin as Manuela Gherdan
- Virgil Ogășanu as Dumitrașcu
- Emil Botta as Vasilică Savu
- Mircea Șeptilici as Bibi Vasiliu
- Tamara Buciuceanu as wife of Boiangiu
- Andrei Ralea
- Cristina Bugeanu
- Elena Caragiu as Gina Ene
- Constantin Fugașin as Nichi, son of Mihai and Alexandra Dan
- Rodica Popescu Bitănescu
- Florina Cercel
- Constantin Bărbulescu
- Chiril Economu
- Grigore Nagacevski
- Alexandra Polizu
- Gheorghe Novac
- Nicolae Relea
- Iuliana Delea
- Elefterie Voiculescu
- Astra Dan
- Alexandru Drăgan
- Gheorghe Cristescu
- Traian Zecheru
- Alexandru Vasiliu
- Vasile Dumitru
- Ana Vlădescu-Aron
- Gheorghe Dinică as Gheorghe Mihoc
