= Stephen the Great - Vaslui 1475 =

- Directed by: Mircea Drăgan
- Starring: Gheorghe Cozorici; Gheorghe Dinică
- Release date: 6 January 1975
- Running time: 2h 17min
- Country: Romania
- Language: Romanian

Stephen the Great - Vaslui 1475 (Romanian: Ștefan cel Mare - Vaslui 1475) is a 1975 Romanian biography film directed by Mircea Drăgan. The film depicts the Battle of Vaslui (1475).

== Plot ==
In 1474, the Ottomans demand passage and tribute from Moldavia on their way to invade western Europe. Moldavia's king, Stephan, objects and mobilizes his subjects to raise an army, while sending emissaries seeking help from other Christian nations. At the same time, Stephen arranges for the relocation of the relatives of his defeated rival, Radu the Handsome, who are being held hostage in Moldavia. Stephen also intervenes in the kidnapping of Marusca, a noblewoman, by a dejected suitor, sending his forces to rescue her and detain her abductor. After Marusca is rescued, Stephen gives his blessing for her to marry Simion, a scion of his faithful noble followers the Jder family. Simion and Marusca bear a child as Simion, his brothers and father join Stephen to battle.

Stephen orders a scorched-earth policy to starve the Ottomans making their way to the Moldavian capital Suceava. At the last minute, the Ottomans decide to face Stephen in the fields of Vaslui rather than seize Suceava outright. On the day of the battle, heavy fog impedes both sides movements, but Stephen orders his forces to feign a retreat from a key bridge to lure to Ottomans into a trap. His maneuver works, and the Ottomans are routed but with heavy losses on both sides, including the male Jders. As the Ottoman commanders are punished in Constantinople, Stephen gives a eulogy at the battlefield honoring the fallen.

== Cast ==
- Gheorghe Cozorici - Stephen the Great
- Gheorghe Dinică - Sultan Mehmed II
- Violeta Andrei - Maria of Mangop, Stephen's wife
- Toma Dimitriu - Stanciu, Stephen's advisor
- Sandina Stan - Lady Ilisafta
- Geo Barton - Nobleman Manole Jder
- Anna Széles - Marusca, Daughter of Iatco Hudici
- Iurie Darie - Nobleman Simion Jder
- Sebastian Papaiani - Nobleman Ionut Jder
- Emanoil Petrut - Orthodox Monk Nicodim
- Ioana Dragan - Candachia
- Florin Piersic - Nobleman Cristea Jder
- Draga Olteanu Matei - Midwife Irina
- Dina Cocea - Sultana Mara
