= Carmen Stănescu =

Romanian actress

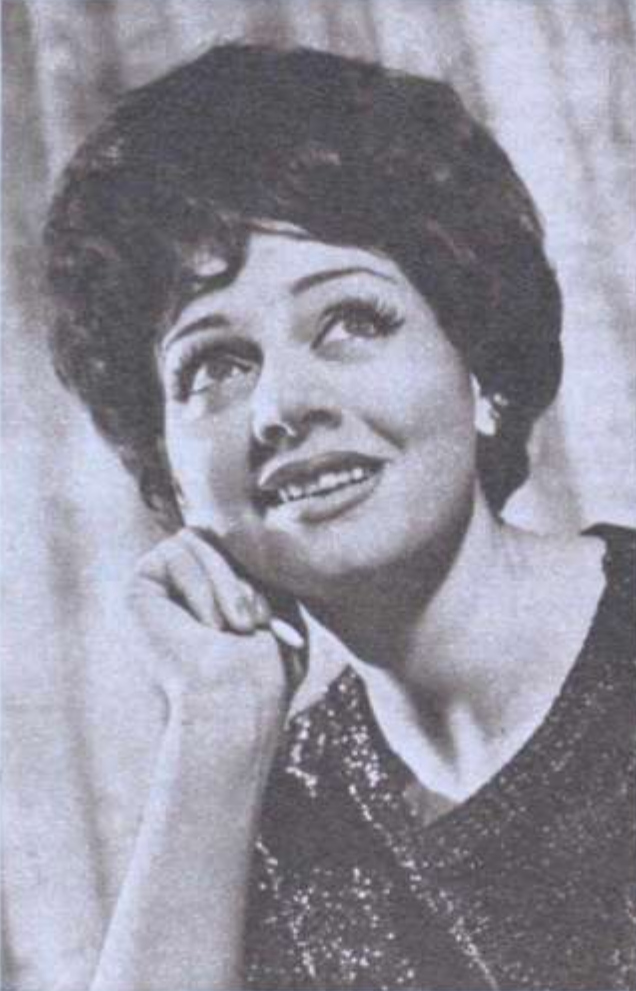
- Stănescu in 1972
- Born: 29 July 1925; Bucharest, Kingdom of Romania
- Died: 11 April 2018 (aged 92); Snagov, Romania
- Resting place: Reinvierea Cemetery
- Occupation: Actress
- Years active: 1945–2018

Carmen Stănescu (29 July 1925 – 11 April 2018) was a Romanian stage and film actress. She was born in Bucharest and died in Snagov.

== Filmography ==
- Bădăranii (1960) as Felice, Canciano Tartuffola's wife
- Frații Jderi (1974)
- Premiera (1976) as Alexandra Dan, wife of Mihai
- Povestea dragostei (1977)
- Războiul de Independență 1977
- Mușchetarul român, directed by Gheorghe Vitanidis, 1975
- Tinerețe fără bătrânețe, directed by Elisabeta Bostan, 1969
- Runda 6, directed by Vladimir Popescu Doreanu, 1965
- Telegrame after I.L. Caragiale, directed by Aurel Miheleș & Gheorghe Naghi, 1959
- Doi vecini after Tudor Arghezi, directed by Geo Saizescu, 1958
- Regina (2008) as Taisia, Cristofor's second wife
- Aniela (2009) as Păuna Vulturesco
- Moștenirea (2010) as Zenobia Popeangă
- Spitalul de demență (2012) as Senator's wife
