= List of Latin translations of modern literature =

A number of Latin translations of modern literature have been made to bolster interest in the language. The perceived dryness of classical literature is sometimes a major obstacle for achieving fluency in reading Latin, as it discourages students from reading large quantities of text (extensive reading). In his preface to his translation of Robinson Crusoe, F. W. Newman writes:

[N]o accuracy of reading small portions of Latin will ever be so effective as extensive reading and to make extensive reading possible to the many, the style ought to be very easy and the matter attractive.

== Modern literature ==
| Latin title | Original title | Original author | Translator | Publisher | Date | Edition notes |
|---|---|---|---|---|---|---|
| Amor Mumiae | Le Roman de la Momie | Théophile Gautier | Rowan X. Adler | Discoverlatin.com | 2024 | Reviewed in Vox Latina, Fasc. 239, Anno 2025, paginis 147–148 by Sigrides Albert. |
| Petrus Pan | Peter Pan | J. M. Barrie | Rowan X. Adler | Discoverlatin.com | 2025 | |
| Vestes Novae Imperatoris | The Emperor's New Clothes, (Danish original: Kejserens Nye Klæder) | Andersen, Hans Christian | Landis, Ferderick | American Classical League | 1969 | |
| Amor est sensus quidam peculiaris | Love is a Special Way of Feeling | Anglund, Joan Walsh | Lyne, G. M. | London: Collins | 1969 | |
| De Corde et Mente | Sense and Sensibility | Austen, Jane | Rumford, James | Manoa Press | 2020 | |
| De Persuasione | Persuasion | Austen, Jane | Rumford, James | Manoa Press | 2023 | with macrons |
| Superbia et Odium | Pride and Prejudice | Austen, Jane | Cotton, Tom | Lulu.com | 2014 | |
| Superbi et Iniqui | Pride and Prejudice | Austen, Jane | Rumford, James | Manoa Press | 2024 | with macrons |
| Magus Mirabilis in Oz | The Wonderful Wizard of Oz | Baum, L. Frank | Hinke, C. J. and Van Buren, George | Berkeley, CA: Scholar Press | 1987 | |
| Vathecus | Vathek | Beckford, William | Van der Pas, Sara | Lulu.com | 2018 | |
| Nuticulus Satyrique | Noddy and the Goblins | Blyton, Enid | Brice, Elizabeth | Penguin Books | 1993 | |
| Ursus Nomine Paddington | A Bear Called Paddington | Bond, Michael | Needham, Peter | London: Gerald Duckworth & Co Ltd | 1999 | |
| Nuptiae Abderitanae | Die Kleinbürgerhochzeit | Brecht, Bertolt | Gross, Nicolas | Weißenhorn: Leo Latinus | 2004 | |
| Opera poetica | Básnické spisy | Březina, Otokar | Šprincl, Jan | Pavel Mervart | 2013 | |
| Fabellae pueriles | Bilderpossen | Busch, Wilhelm | | Florence: Le Monnier | 1960 | |
| Max et Moritz | Max und Moritz | Busch, Wilhelm | Steindl, Erwin | Munich: Braun & Schneider | 1925 | |
| Max et Moritz | Max und Moritz | Busch, Wilhelm | Merten, Gotthold | Munich: Braun & Schneider | 1932 | |
| Max et Moritz | Max und Moritz | Busch, Wilhelm | Schlosser, Franz | Stuttgart: Philipp Reclam jun. | 1993 | |
| Plisch et Plum | Plisch und Plum | Busch, Wilhelm | Benning, Ludwig | Zürich, Munich: Artemis | 1976 | |
| Pericla Navarchi Magonis | Les Aventures du Capitaine Magon | Cahun, David Léon | Avellanus, Arcadius | NY: E. Parmalee Prentice (Mount Hope Classics Vol. 1) | 1914 | |
| Makita Sive De Historia Cuiusdam Muris Tempore Pharaonum | Makit, une histoire de souris au temps des Pharaons | Capart, Johannes | Deraedt, Francisca | Brussels: Melissa Foundation | 1997 | |
| Alicia In Terra Mirabili | Alice in Wonderland | Carroll, Lewis | Carruthers, Clive Harcourt | London: Macmillan / NY: St Martin's Press | 1964 | Re-edited with macrons |
| Aliciae Per Speculum Transitus | Alice Through the Looking Glass | Carroll, Lewis | Carruthers, Clive Harcourt | NY: St. Martin's Press | 1966 | |
| | The Hunting of the Snark. An Agony in Eight Fits | Carroll, Lewis | Brinton, Percival Robert | London: Macmillan & Co. | 1934 | |
| | The Hunting of the Snark. An Agony in Eight Fits | Carroll, Lewis | Watson, Hubert Digby | Oxford: Basil Blackwell | 1936 | |
| Jabberwocky: Mors iabrochii | Jabberwocky | Carroll, Lewis | Vansittart, Augustus Arthur | Oxford: Oxford University Press | 1881 | |
| Jabberwocky etc. (more English rhymes with Latin renderings) | Jabberwocky | Carroll, Lewis | Watson, Hubert Digby | Oxford: Basil Blackwell | 1937 | |
| De familia Pascual Duarte | La Familia de Pascual Duarte | Cela, Camilo José | Pastor de Arozena, Bárbara | Madrid: Editorial Coloquio: Ediciones Clásicas | 1990 | |
| Dominus Quixotus a Manica | Don Quixote | Cervantes Saavedra, Miguel de | Torres, Antonio Peral | Centro de Estudios Cervantinos | 1998 | |
| Vere Virginia, Sanctus Nicholas est! | Yes, Virginia, there is a Santa Claus | Church, Frank | Sauer, Walter and Wiegand, Hermann | Wauconda, IL,: Bolchazy-Carducci Publishers | 2001 | |
| Pinoculus liber qui inscribitur | Le avventure di Pinocchio | Collodi, Carlo | Maffacini, Henry | Firenze: Marzocco | 1950 | |
| De morte Vestae | De dood van Vesta | Couperus, Louis | Jenniges, Wolfgang | Brussels: Melissa | 2006 | |
| Virtūtis Color | The Red Badge of Courage | Crane, Stephen | Rumford, James | Manoa Press | 2022 | With macrons |
| De Bello Romano | A Struggle for Rome, (German original: Ein Kampf um Rom) | Felix Dahn | BJ Smith | Independent | 2024 | |
| Rebilius Cruso | Robinson Crusoe | Defoe, Daniel | Newman, Francis W. | London: Trübner & Co. | 1884 | Rewriting. Version updated with macrons on the Project Gutenberg |
| Robinson Crusoëus | Robinson Crusoe | Defoe, Daniel | Goffeaux, François Joseph | Paris: Lycée impérial | 1809 | Multiple re-editions |
| Vita Discriminaque Robinsonis Crusoei | Robinson Crusoe | Defoe, Daniel | Avellanus, Arcadius | NY: E. Parmalee Prentice (Mount Hope Classics Vol. 9-7 | 1928 | |
| Exules Siberiani | La Jeune Sibérienne | de Maistre, Xavier | Broadhead, H.D. | London and Christchurch (N.Z.): Whitcombe and Tombs | 1932 | |
| Regulus vel pueri soli sapiunt | Le petit prince | de Saint Exupéry, Antoine | Haury, Auguste | Paris: Fernand Hazan Éditeur | 1961 | |
| Regulus | Le petit prince | de Saint Exupéry, Antoine | Winkler, Alexander | Mannheim: Artemis & Winkler | 2010 | |
| Principulus - Der kleine Prinz auf Lateinisch | Le petit prince | de Saint Exupéry, Antoine | Schlosser, Ernst | Ditzingen: Reclam Verlag | 2015 | |
| Somnium Filii de Stella et Fabula Filii | A Child's Dream of a Star and A Child's Story | Dickens, Charles | Hanes, William A. | Createspace | 2013 | |
| Carmen ad Festum Nativitatis | A Christmas Carol | Dickens, Charles | Cotton, Tom | Lulu.com | 2011 | |
| Spina Piscis Magica | The Magic Fishbone | Dickens, Charles | Hanes, William A. | Createspace | 2013 | |
| Gruffalo | The Gruffalo | Donaldson, Julia | Harris, Ben | London: Pan Macmillan | 2012 | |
| Ritualia Musgraviensia | The Adventure of the Musgrave Ritual | Doyle, Arthur Conan | Churchill, Paul and Fewell, Dale K. | Battered Silicon Dispatch Box | 1998 | |
| Cattus Petasatus! | The Cat in the Hat | Dr. Seuss | Tunberg, Jennifer Morrish and Tunberg, Terence O. | Wauconda, IL: Bolchazy-Carducci Publishers | 2000 | |
| Virent ova! Viret perna! | Green Eggs and Ham | Dr. Seuss | Tunberg, Jennifer Morrish and Tunberg, Terence O. | Wauconda, IL: Bolchazy-Carducci Publishers | 2003 | |
| Quomodo invidiosulus nomine Grinchus Christi Natalem abrogaverit | How the Grinch Stole Christmas | Dr. Seuss | Tunberg, Jennifer Morrish and Tunberg, Terence O. | Wauconda, IL: Bolchazy-Carducci Publishers | 1998 | |
| O, Loca tu Ibis | Oh, the Places You'll Go! | Dr. Seuss | Roselle, Leone | Portland, ME: J. Weston Walch | 1994 | |
| Romulus Magnus | Romulus der Große | Dürrenmatt, Friedrich | Gross, Nicolas | Weißenhorn: Leo Latinus | | |
| De Crambambulo | Krambambuli | Ebner-Eschenbach, Marie von | Gross, Nicolas | Weißenhorn: Leo Latinus | | |
| Fasciculus florum | Kytice | Erben, Karel Jaromír | Šprincl, Jan | Masarykova univerzita | 2018 | |
| Olivia: The Essential Latin Edition | Olivia | Falconer, Ian | High, Amy | NY: Atheneum | 2007 | |
| Petrus Cuniculus et Pa | Peter Rabbit and His Pa | Field, Louise A | Hanes, William A. | Createspace | 2015 | |
| Arborum Sator | L'Homme Qui Plantait des Arbres | Giono, Jean | Rumford, James | Manoa Press | 2025 | With macrons |
| Werther Iuvenis Quae Passus Sit | Die Leiden des jungen Werthers | Goethe, Johann Wolfgang von | Gross, Nicolas | Weißenhorn: Leo Latinus | | |
| Villa deserta | The Deserted Village | Goldsmith, Oliver | Humphries, William | Londini: Typis Dennett Jaques | 1790 | |
| Pagus desertus | The Deserted Village | Goldsmith, Oliver | Bulmer, John | Cambridge: Jones & Piggott | 1881 | |
| Pullus Nicolellus | Le Petit Nicolas | Goscinny, René | Antébi, Elisabeth and Seignes, Marie-France | Paris: IMAV Editions | 2012 | |
| De Aranea Nigra | The Black Spider | Gotthelf, Jeremias | Gross, Nicolas | Weißenhorn: Leo Latinus | | |
| Aurae Inter Salices | The Wind in the Willows | Grahame, Kenneth | Cotton, Tom | Lulu.com | 2011 | |
| Fallentis semita vitae | Elegy Written in a Country Churchyard | Gray, Thomas | Brinton, Percival Robert | Oxford: Basil Blackwell | 1938 | |
| Apologi Grimmiani | Die Märchen der Brüder Grimm | Grimm, Jacob & Wilhelm | | Saarbrücken: Verlag der Societas Latina | 1988 | |
| Erat Olim | Die Märchen der Brüder Grimm | Grimm, Jacob & Wilhelm | Schlosser, Franz | Stuttgart: Reclam | 2015 | |
| Fabellae pueriles et domesticae a Iacobo & Vilhelmo Grimm collectae: Fabellae 1-5 | Die Märchen der Brüder Grimm | Grimm, Jacob & Wilhelm | Gross, Nicolas | Weißenhorn: Leo Latinus | 2004 | |
| Fabellae pueriles et domesticae a Iacobo & Vilhelmo Grimm collectae: Fabellae 6-20 | Die Märchen der Brüder Grimm | Grimm, Jacob & Wilhelm | Gross, Nicolas | Weißenhorn: Leo Latinus | 2007 | |
| Nonnulli apologi Grimmiani | Die Märchen der Brüder Grimm | Grimm, Jacob & Wilhelm | Habitzky, Rochus | Ruppichteroth: Canisius-Werk | 2003 | |
| Rumpelstultulus Fabula | Rumpelstilzchen | Grimm, Jacob & Wilhelm | Fendrick, John W. | Oxford, Ohio: American Classical League | 1978 | |
| De Thilo Custode Ferriviae | Bahnwärter Thiel | Hauptmann, Gerhart | Gross, Nicolas | Weißenhorn: Leo Latinus | | |
| Et Oritur Sol | The Sun Also Rises | Hemingway, Ernest | Rumford, James | Manoa Press | 2022 | |
| Siddhārtha | Siddhartha | Hesse, Hermann | Rumford, James | Manoa Press | 2021 | With macrons |
| Sub rota | Unterm Rad | Hesse, Hermann | Albert, Sigrides C. | Saraviponti: Verl. der Soc. | 1994 | |
| The Latin Struwwelpeter | Der Struwwelpeter | Hoffman, Heinrich | Rouse, W.H.D. | London: Blackie & Son | 1934 | |
| Petrus Hirsutus | Der Struwwelpeter | Hoffman, Heinrich | Schmidt, Hans Jürgen | Potsdam: Rütten & Loening | 1938 | |
| Petrus Hirsutus | Der Struwwelpeter | Hoffman, Heinrich | Wiesmann, Peter | St. Gallen: Tschudy | 1954 | |
| Der Struwwelpeter auf lateinisch | Der Struwwelpeter | Hoffman, Heinrich | Bornemann, Eduard | Frankfurt au Main: Rütten & Loening | 1956 | |
| Petrus Ericius | Der Struwwelpeter | Hoffman, Heinrich | Paoli, Ugo Enrico | Bern: Francke / Florence: Le Monnier | 1960 | |
| Shock-Headed Peter: in Latin-English-German | Der Struwwelpeter | Hoffman, Heinrich | Wiesmann, Peter | Wauconda, IL: Bolchazy-Carducci Publishers | 2002 | |
| Captivus Zendae | The Prisoner of Zenda | Hope, Anthony | Cotton, Tom | Lulu.com | 2011 | |
| De Aemilio et Investigatoribus | Emil und die Detektive | Kästner, Erich | Krauße, Ulrich | Ibbenbüren: MundusLatinus | 2011 | |
| Commentarii de Inepto Puero | Diary of a Wimpy Kid | Kinney, Jeff | Gallagher, Daniel | Office of Latin Letters, The Vatican | 2015 | |
| Anecdota Kleistiana | Anekdote aus dem letzten preußischen Kriege | Kleist, Heinrich von | Gross, Nicolas | Weißenhorn: Leo Latinus | | |
| Walter Canis Inflatus | Walter the Farting Dog | Kotzwinkle, William | Dobbin, Robert | Berkeley, CA: Frog Books | 2004 | |
| Ferdinandus taurus | Ferdinand the Bull | Leaf, Munro | Hadas, Elizabeth Chamberlayne | NY: David McKay Company | 1962 | |
| Hiawatha | The Song of Hiawatha | Longfellow, Henry Wadsworth | Newman, Francis W. | London: Walton and Maberly | 1862 | |
| Domus Anguli Puensis | The House at Pooh Corner | Milne, A.A. | Staples, Brian | London: Methuen/Egmont | 1980 | |
| Winnie Ille Pu semper ludet | The House at Pooh Corner | Milne, A.A. | Staples, Brian | NY: Dutton | 1998 | |
| Winnie ille Pu | Winnie the Pooh | Milne, A.A. | Lenard, Alexander | London: Methuen / NY: Dutton | 1960 | |
| Beata illa nox | The Night before Christmas | Moore, Clement | Wiegand, Hermann and Sauer, Walter | Neckarsteinach: Edition Tintenfaß | 2005 | |
| Carmina lunovilia | Das Mondschaf | Morgenstern, Christian | Wiesmann, Peter | Zürich: Artemis | 1965 | |
| Mater Anserina: Poems in Latin for Children | | Mother Goose | Minkova, Milena and Tunberg, Terence | Focus Publishing/R. Pullins Co | 2006 | |
| Ave Ogden! Nash in Latin | Poems By Ogden Nash | Nash, Ogden | Gleeson, James C. and Meyer, Brian N. | Boston: Little, Brown | 1973 | |
| Fundus Animalium | Animal Farm | Orwell, George | Cotton, Tom | Lulu.com | 2011 | |
| Gemini Batavi - Libellus Elementarius | The Dutch Twins Primer | Perkins, Lucy Fitch | Hanes, William A. | Createspace | 2015 | |
| Fabulae Gallicae | Histoires ou contes du temps passé | Perrault, Charles | d’Aumale, Laurent | latinitium.com | 2021 | |
| Tres Fabulae Edgarii Allani Poe: Cattus niger, Ranunculus, Puteus et Pendulum | Three Stories by Edgar Allan Poe | Poe, Edgar Allan | Gross, Nicholas | Weißenhorn: Leo Latinus | 2004 | |
| Colloquium Iradis et Charmii | The Conversation of Eiros and Charmion | Poe, Edgar Allan | Van der Pas, Sara | Lulu.com | 2018 | |
| Eleonora | Eleonora | Poe, Edgar Allan | Van der Pas, Sara | Lulu.com | 2018 | |
| Persona Mortis Rubrae | The Masque of the Red Death | Poe, Edgar Allan | Van der Pas, Sara | Lulu.com | 2018 | |
| Fabula de Beniamine Lago | The Tale of Benjamin Bunny | Potter, Beatrix | Hanes, William A. | Createspace | 2013 | |
| Fabula de Crusto et Catinulo | The Tale of the Pie and the Patty-Pan | Potter, Beatrix | Hanes, William A. | Createspace | 2014 | |
| Fabula de Domina Tiggi-Uinkel | The Tale of Mrs. Tiggy-Winkle | Potter, Beatrix | Hanes, William A. | Createspace | 2013 | |
| Fabula de Domine Tode | The Tale of Mr. Tod | Potter, Beatrix | Hanes, William A. | Createspace | 2013 | |
| Fabula de Domino Ieremia Piscatore | The Tale of Mr. Jeremy Fisher | Potter, Beatrix | Walker, E. Peroto | London: Frederick Warne & Co., Ltd. | 1978 | |
| Fabula de Duobus Muribus Improbis | The Tale of Two Bad Mice | Potter, Beatrix | Hanes, William A. | Createspace | 2014 | |
| Fabula De Jemima Anate Aquatica | The Tale of Jemima Puddleduck | Potter, Beatrix | Musgrave, Jonathan | London: Frederick Warne & Co., Ltd. | 1965 | |
| Vestitor de Gloucestre | The Tailor of Gloucester | Potter, Beatrix | Hanes, William A. | Createspace | 2014 | |
| Fabula de Iohanno Mure Urbano | The Tale of Johnny Town-Mouse | Potter, Beatrix | Hanes, William A. | Createspace | 2013 | |
| Fabula De Petro Cuniculo | The Tale of Peter Rabbit | Potter, Beatrix | Walker, E. Peroto | London: Frederick Warne & Co., Ltd. | 1962 | |
| Fabula de Petro Cuniculo | The Tale of Peter Rabbit | Potter, Beatrix | Hanes, William A. | Createspace | 2013 | |
| Fabula de Samuhele Barbato | The Tale of Samuel Whiskers | Potter, Beatrix | Hanes, William A. | Createspace | 2014 | |
| Fabula de Sciuro Nuciola | The Tale of Squirrel Nutkin | Potter, Beatrix | Hanes, William A. | Createspace | 2013 | |
| Fabula de Thoma Feliculo | The Tale of Tom Kitten | Potter, Beatrix | Hanes, William A. | Createspace | 2013 | |
| Festum Nativitatis Christi Petri Cuniculi | Peter Rabbit's Christmas | Graham, Duff | Hanes, William A. | Createspace | 2015 | |
| Parvulus | En Patufet | Popular Catalan tale | Martin, Ana | Amazon KDP | 2021 | |
| Mons Spes, et novellae aliae | Mount-Hope; The King of the Golden River; La Parure; The House and the Brain; The Sire de Maletroit's Door [Svppe tiarivm mergvlarvm] | E. P. Prentice; John Ruskin; Guy de Maupassant; Edward Bulwer-Lytton; Robert Louis Stevenson; E. P. Prentice | Avellanus, Arcadius | NY: E. P. Prentice Mount Hope Classics, Vol. 2 | 1918 | |
| Crabatus | Krabat | Preußler, Otfried | Gross, Nicolas | Weißenhorn: Leo Latinus | 2015 | |
| Baronis Mynchusani mirabilia itinera et pericula marina terrestiaque | Baron Munchausen's Narrative of his Marvellous Travels and Campaigns in Russia | Raspe, Rudolf Erich | Gross, Nicolas | Bruxelles: Fundatio Melissa | 2001 | |
| De nocte Olisiponensi | The Night in Lisbon | Remarque, Erich Maria | Albert, Sigrides C. | Saraviponti: Verl. der Soc. | 2002 | |
| Harrius Potter et camera secretorum | Harry Potter and the Chamber of Secrets | Rowling, J. K. | Needham, Peter | London / New York: Bloomsbury | 2007 | |
| Harrius Potter et philosophi lapis | Harry Potter and the Philosopher's Stone | Rowling, J. K. | Needham, Peter | London / New York: Bloomsbury | 2003 | |
| Rex Aurei Rivi | The King of the Golden River | Ruskin, John | Avellanus, Arcadius | New York: E. P. Prentice | 1914 | |
| Tristitia salve | Bonjour Tristesse | Sagan, Francois | Lenard, Alexander | Stuttgart: Deutsche Verlags-Anstalt | 1964 | |
| Regulus | Le Petit prince | Saint-Exupéry, Antoine de | Haury, Augusto | Mariner Books | 2001 | |
| Carthago in Flammis | Carthage in Flames, (Italian original: Carthagine in Fiamme) | Emilio Salgari | BJ Smith | Independent | 2024 | |
| Memento mori | Memento mori | Saxon, Alex | Gross, Nicolas | Weißenhorn: Leo Latinus | | |
| Jippus et Jannica | Jip en Janneke | Schmidt, Annie M. G. | Harm-Jan van Dam | Athenaeum | 2000 | |
| Ubi Fera Sunt | Where the Wild Things Are | Sendak, Maurice | LaFleur, Richard A. | Wauconda, IL: Bolchazy-Carducci Publishers | 2015 | |
| Julius Caesar | Julius Caesar | Shakespeare, William | Denison, Henry | Oxford, London | 1856 | |
| Arbor Alma | The Giving Tree | Silverstein, Shel | Tunberg, Jennifer Morrish and Tunberg, Terence O (Guenevera Tunberg et Terentio Tunberg) | Wauconda, IL: Bolchazy-Carducci Publishers. 0865164991 | 2002 | |
| Lepusculorum Schola | The Rabbit School | Sixtus, Albert | Wiegand, Hermann | Edition Tintenfaß | 2010 | |
| Mysterium Arcae Boulé | The Boulé Cabinet Mystery | Stevenson, Burton E. | Avellanus, Arcadius | NY: E. Parmalee Prentice (Mount Hope Classics Vol. 3) | 1916 | |
| Carmina Non Prius Audita De Ludis et Hortis Virginibus Puerisque | A Child's Garden of Verses | Stevenson, R.L. | Glover, T.R. | Cambridge: Heffer | 1922 | |
| Īnsolitus Cāsus Doctōris Jekyll et Dominī Hyde | Dr Jekyll and Mr Hyde | Stevenson, R. L. | Dome, Garrett | Evertype | 2022 | With macrons |
| Insula Thesauraria | Treasure Island | Stevenson, R. L. | Avellanus, Arcadius | NY: E. Parmalee Prentice (Mount Hope Classics Vol. 5) | 1922 | |
| Hospes Draculae | Dracula's Guest | Stoker, Bram | Widmann, Christina | Createspace | 2017 | |
| Fabulae Divales | The Rose Fairy Book (and an adaptation of Cupid and Psyche from The Golden Ass) | Mrs Herbert Strang (and Apuleius) | Avellanus, Arcadius | NY: E. P. Prentice Mount Hope Classics, Vol. 4) | 1912 | Re-edited with macrons |
| Scidula | Ett halvt ark papper | Strindberg, August | Jenniges, Wolfgang | Brussels: Melissa | 2012 | |
| Fragrantia, Historia Homicida | Das Parfum | Süskind, Patrick | Gross, Nicolas | Weißenhorn: Leo Latinus | | |
| Villi Mus | Willie Mouse | Tabor, Alta | Hanes, William A. | Createspace | 2013 | |
| Hobbitus Ille | The Hobbit | Tolkien, J.R.R. | Walker, Mark | London: HarperCollins | 2012 | |
| Anulorum Erus | The Lord of the Rings | Tolkien, J.R.R. | Richard Sturch | Self-published | 2014 | Limited edition of 30 copies, never commercially available |
| Maria Poppina ab A-Z | Mary Poppins A-Z | Travers, P.L. | Lyne, G.M. | NY: Harcourt, Brace | 1968 | |
| | A Ghost Story | Twain, Mark | Kozak, Alexander George | (unpublished) | 1996 | |
| Pericla Thomae Sawyer | The Adventures of Tom Sawyer | Twain, Mark | Rumford, James | Honolulu: Manoa Press | 2016 | Re-edited with macrons |
| Tela Charlottae | Charlotte's Web | White, E. B. | Fox, Bernard | NY: HarperCollins | 1985 | |
| Historia Agathonis | Geschichte des Agathon | Wieland, Christoph Martin | Gross, Nicolas | Weißenhorn: Leo Latinus | | |
| Quam grave est Severum esse | The Importance of Being Earnest | Wilde, Oscar | Coderch, Juan | Juan Coderch | 2021 | |
| Velvetīnus Cunīculus | The Velveteen Rabbit | Williams, Margery | Rumford, James | Honolulu: Manoa Press | 2020 | With macrons |
| David et Phoenix | David and the Phoenix | Edward Ormondroyd | Robert G. Natelson | Thinklings Books | 2024 | |
| De Tribus Investigatoribus et Fato Draconis | Die drei Fragezeichen Der Fluch des Drachen | André Marx | Ulrich Krauße | MundusLatinus | 2010 | vocabulary in footnotes, dictionary in appendix |

== Comics ==
| Latin title | Original title | Original author | Translator | Publisher | Date |
|---|---|---|---|---|---|
| Haegar terribilis. Miles sine timore vitiisque | Hägar the Horrible | Browne, Dik | Ulrichs, Karl | München: Goldmann | 1986 |
| Asterix #1: Asterix Gallus | Astérix le Gaulois | Goscinny, René | Molina, J. | Murcia: Molina | 1968 |
| Asterix #1: Asterix Gallus | Astérix le Gaulois | Goscinny, René | Rubricastellanus, Carolus | Amsterdam/Brussels: Elsevier | 1973 |
| Asterix #2: Asterix et Falx Aurea | La serpe d'or | Goscinny, René | Molina, J. | Murcia: Molina | 1968 |
| Asterix #2: Falx Aurea | La serpe d'or | Goscinny, René | Rubricastellanus, Carolus | Stuttgart: Ehapa | 1975 |
| Asterix #3: Asterix apud Gothos | Astérix et les Goths | Goscinny, René | Rubricastellanus, Carolus | Stuttgart: Ehapa | 1976 |
| Asterix #4: Asterix Gladiator | Astérix gladiateur | Goscinny, René | Rubricastellanus, Carolus | Stuttgart: Ehapa | 1977 |
| Asterix #5: Iter Gallicum | Le tour de Gaule d'Astérix | Goscinny, René | Rubricastellanus, Carolus | Stuttgart: Ehapa | 1978 |
| Asterix #6: Asterix et Cleopatra | Astérix et Cléopatre | Goscinny, René | Rubricastellanus, Carolus | Stuttgart: Ehapa | 1980 |
| Asterix #7: Certamen principum | Le combat des chefs | Goscinny, René | Rubricastellanus, Carolus | Stuttgart: Ehapa | 1981 |
| Asterix #8: Asterix apud Britannos | Astérix chez les Bretons | Goscinny, René | Rubricastellanus, Carolus | Stuttgart: Ehapa | 1982 |
| Asterix #9: Asterix et Normanni | Astérix et les Normands | Goscinny, René | Rubricastellanus, Carolus | Stuttgart: Ehapa | 1983 |
| Asterix #10: Asterix Legionarius | Astérix légionnaire | Goscinny, René | Rubricastellanus, Carolus | Stuttgart: Ehapa | 1984 |
| Asterix #11: Clipeus Arvernus | Le bouclier Arverne | Goscinny, René | Rubricastellanus, Carolus | Stuttgart: Ehapa | 1985 |
| Asterix #12: Asterix Olympius | Astérix aus Jeux Olympiques | Goscinny, René | Rubricastellanus, Carolus | Stuttgart: Ehapa | 1985 |
| Asterix #13: Asterix atque olla Cypria | Astérix et le chaudron | Goscinny, René | Rubricastellanus, Carolus | Stuttgart: Ehapa | 1986 |
| Asterix #14: Asterix in Hispania | Astérix en Hispanie | Goscinny, René | Rubricastellanus, Carolus | Stuttgart: Ehapa | 1987 |
| Asterix #15: Tumultus de Asterige | La zizanie | Goscinny, René | Rubricastellanus, Carolus | Stuttgart: Ehapa | 1989 |
| Asterix #16: Asterix apud Helvetios | Astérix chez les Helvètes | Goscinny, René | Rubricastellanus, Carolus | Stuttgart: Ehapa | 2005 |
| Asterix #21: Laurea Caesaris | Les lauriers de César | Goscinny, René | Rubricastellanus, Carolus | Stuttgart: Ehapa | 2015 |
| Asterix #25: Fossa Alta | Le grand fossé | Uderzo, Albert | Rubricastellanus, Carolus | Stuttgart: Ehapa | 1981 |
| Asterix #26: Odyssea Asterigis | L'Oddysée d Astérix | Uderzo, Albert | Rubricastellanus, Carolus | Stuttgart: Ehapa | 1983 |
| Asterix #27: Filius Asterigis | Les fils d'Astérix | Uderzo, Albert | Rubricastellanus, Carolus | Stuttgart: Ehapa | 1984 |
| Asterix #28: Asterix Orientalis | Astérix chez Rahazade | Uderzo, Albert | Rubricastellanus, Carolus | Stuttgart: Ehapa | 1988 |
| Asterix #29: Asterix et Maestria | La rose et le glaive | Uderzo, Albert | Rubricastellanus, Carolus | Stuttgart: Ehapa | 1991 |
| Asterix #30: Navis actuaria Obeligis | La galère d'Obélix | Uderzo, Albert | Rubricastellanus, Carolus | Stuttgart: Ehapa | 1998 |
| Asterix #31: Asterix et Latraviata | Asterix et Latraviata | Uderzo, Albert | Rubricastellanus, Carolus | Stuttgart: Ehapa | 2002 |
| Asterix #33: Caelum in Caput ejus Cadit | Le ciel lui tombe sur la tête | Uderzo, Albert | Anna Coloniata Fuxeana | Vanves: AlbertRené | 2007 |
| Asterix #35: Papyrus Caesaris | Le papyrus de César | Ferri, Jean-Yves and Conrad, Didier | Rubricastellanus, Carolus | Stuttgart: Ehapa | 2016 |
| De Titini et Miluli Facinoribus: De Insula Nigra | Les aventures de Tintin: L'île noire | Herge | Eichenseer, Caelestis | Tournai: ELI / Castermann | 1987 |
| De Titini et Miluli Facinoribus: De Sigaris Pharaonis | Les aventurs de Tintin: Les cigares du pharao | Herge | Eichenseer, Caelestis | Tournai: ELI / Castermann | 1990 |
| Alix: Spartaci Filius | Alix: Le Fils de Spartacus | Martin, Jacques | Aziza, Claudius and Dubrocard, Michael | Stuttgart: Klett | 1994 |
| Alix Senator: Aquilae Cruoris | Alix Senator: Les aigles de sang | Valérie Mangin | Annie Collognat | Tournai: ELI / Castermann | 2018 |
| Carolini Brown Sapientia | Wisdom of Charlie Brown | Schulz, Charles | Pei, Mario | s.n.: Hallmark | 1968 |
| Insuperabilis Snupius | Super Snoopy | Schulz, Charles | Angelino, Guido | Stuttgart: Klett | 1984 |
| Linus de Vita | Linus on Life | Schulz, Charles | Pei, Mario | s.n.: Hallmark | 1968 |
| Mundus Secundum Lucium | The World According to Lucy | Schulz, Charles | Pei, Mario | s.n.: Hallmark | 1968 |
| Philosophia Secundum Snoopy | Snoopy's Philosophy | Schulz, Charles | Pei, Mario | s.n.: Hallmark | 1968 |
| Disney Linguā Latinā: Donaldus Anas atque nox Saraceni | Paperino e la notte del saraceno | Rota, Marco | Mir, Josephus | European Language Institute | 1984 |
| Disney Linguā Latinā: Michaël Musculus et "Lapis Sapientiae" | Topolino e la "pietra di saggezza" | De Vita, Massimo | Egger, Carolus | European Language Institute | 1984 |
| Disney Linguà Latinà #3: Donáldus Anas et Actiónes Fidûciae | Paperino e l'operazione F | Francesc Bargadà Studio | Mir, Josephus | European Language Institute | 1984 |
| Disney Linguà Latinà #4: Scrúgulus et Rádius Contra Procéllam | Zio Paperone e il raggio anticiclone | Scala, Guido | Mir, Josephus | European Language Institute | 1984 |
| Disney Linguà Latinà #5: Scrugulus in Re Vere Mirabili | Zio Paperone in un caso davvero imprevedibile | Salvagnini, Rudy and Cavazzano, Giorgio | Mir, Josephus | European Language Institute | 1985 |
| Disney Linguà Latinà #6: Míchaël Músculus et Regína Áfricae | Topolino e la Regina d'Africa | Scarpa, Romano | Egger, Carolus | European Language Institute | 1986 |
| Popeius - De Circi Mysterio | Popeye | Segar, E. C. | Pacitti, Amadeus | Recanati: ELI | 1985 |
| Lucius et Lucia: De Secreto Gladiatorum | Suske en Wiske: Het geheim van de gladiatoren | Willy Vandersteen | | Standaard Uitgeverij | 1990 |
| Lucius et Lucia: De Larva Hispana | Suske en Wiske: Het Spaanse spook | Willy Vandersteen | | Standaard Uitgeverij | 1997 |
| Pondus: Licetne interpellare? | Pondus | Frode Øverli | | MareSilva | 2002 |

== See also ==
- Libri Latine redditi in Vicipaedia Latina (Wikipedia in Latin)
- List of modern literature translated into dead languages
- List of recent original books in Latin
