= The Afternoon of a Torturer =

2001 film by Lucian Pintilie

- Directed by: Lucian Pintilie
- Starring: Gheorghe Dinică; Radu Beligan
- Release date: 7 September 2001 (VFF)
- Running time: 1h 20min
- Country: Romania
- Language: Romanian

The Afternoon of a Torturer (Romanian: După-amiaza unui torționar) is a 2001 Romanian biography film directed by Lucian Pintilie. It recounts an interview with Franț Țandără, a parricide and a torturer in the Communist jails, who openly confesses to the terrible crimes he committed in his youth. Out of the estimated 1,700 Romanians whose mission under the regime was torturing political prisoners, Țandără was the only one who felt a need to confess.

The film has been described as "a story on the banality of evil and the inhumane atrocity of man". It is based on the 1999 book The Road to Damascus: Confession of a former torturer by Doina Jela, the inspiration for the journalist in the movie.

== Cast ==
- Gheorghe Dinică — Franț Țandără
- Radu Beligan — The professor
- Ioana Ana Macaria — The journalist
- Coca Bloos — Franț's wife
