= List of modern literature translated into dead languages =

This is a list of translations of modern literature into dead languages. There is a separate list of such translations into Latin.

== Modern literature ==
Target language	Translation title	Original title	Original author	Translator	Publisher	Date
Egyptian	Le Petit Prince	Le petit prince	Antoine de Saint-Exupéry	Claude Carrier	Edition Tintenfaß	2017
Egyptian	The Tale of Peter Rabbit - Hieroglyph Edition	The Tale of Peter Rabbit	Beatrix Potter	J.F. Nunn and R.B. Parkinson	The British Museum Press	2005
Ancient Greek	Ἅνσελ καὶ Γρέτελ	Hansel and Gretel	Brothers Grimm	Christophe Rico & Stephen Hill	Polis Institute Press	2021
Ancient Greek	Ἅρειος Ποτὴρ καὶ ἡ τοῦ φιλοσόφου λίθος	Harry Potter and the Philosopher's Stone	J. K. Rowling	Andrew Wilson	Bloomsbury	2004
Ancient Greek	Οι χαρακτήρες του Δον Καμίλο και του Σέρλοκ Χολμς ... στα Αρχαία Ελληνικά / Don Camillo and Sherlock Holmes ... in Classical Greek	A Sherlock Holmes case "The Case of the Three Students", and a Don Camillo story "The Procession"	Sir Arthur Conan Doyle + Giovannino Guareschi	Dr. Juan Coderch	Methexis	2011
Ancient Greek	The Little Prince...in Ancient Greek	Le petit prince	Antoine de Saint-Exupéry	Dr. Juan Coderch	Juan Coderch	2017
Ancient Greek	Max und Moritz auf Altgriechisch	Max und Moritz	Wilhelm Busch	Otto Schmied	Reclam, Ditzingen	2007
Koine Greek	Peter Rabbit and Other Stories in Koine Greek	The Tale of Peter Rabbit, The Tale of Benjamin Bunny, The Tale of the Flopsy Bunnies	Beatrix Potter	Gary Manning	GlossaHouse	2020
Koine Greek	The Tale of Peter Rabbit in Koine Greek	The Tale of Peter Rabbit	Beatrix Potter	Joey McCollum & Brent Niedergall	Gorgias Press	2020
Classical Syriac	The Tale of Peter Rabbit in Classical Syriac	The Tale of Peter Rabbit	Beatrix Potter	George Anton Kiraz	Gorgias Press	2022
Ancient Greek	Τὸ φάντασμα μίφα	het spook nijntje	Dick Bruna		Bornmeer	2013
Ancient Greek	Ϝίννι-ὁ-Φῦ.: Winnie the Pooh in Ancient Greek	Winnie the Pooh	A. A. Milne	Peter Stork	Primavera Pers	2020
Gothic	Agjabairhts wairþiþ rauþs (𐌰𐌲𐌾𐌰𐌱𐌰𐌹𐍂𐌷𐍄𐍃 𐍅𐌰𐌹𐍂𐌸𐌹𐌸 𐍂𐌰𐌿𐌸𐍃)	Egbert wird Rot	Philipp Winterberg	Edmund Fairfax, Hroviland Bairhteins		2015
Gothic	Im leitila? (𐌹𐌼 𐌻𐌴𐌹𐍄𐌹𐌻𐌰?)	Bin ich klein?	Philipp Winterberg	Edmund Fairfax, Hroviland Bairhteins		2015
Gothic	Ƕaiwa fuglos ganemun seinos farwos (𐍈𐌰𐌹𐍅𐌰 𐍆𐌿𐌲𐌻𐍉𐍃 𐌲𐌰𐌽𐌴𐌼𐌿𐌽 𐍃𐌴𐌹𐌽𐍉𐍃 𐍆𐌰𐍂𐍅𐍉𐍃)	How Birds Got Their Colors	Harris Tobias	Hroviland Bairhteins	CreateSpace Independent Publishing Platform	2018
Gothic	Balþos Gadedeis Aþalhaidais in Sildaleikalanda (𐌱𐌰𐌻𐌸𐍉𐍃 𐌲𐌰𐌳𐌴𐌳𐌴𐌹𐍃 𐌰𐌸𐌰𐌻𐌷𐌰𐌹𐌳𐌰𐌹𐍃 𐌹𐌽 𐍃𐌹𐌻𐌳𐌰𐌻𐌴𐌹𐌺𐌰𐌻𐌰𐌽𐌳𐌰)	Alice in Wonderland	Lewis Carroll	David Alexander Carlton	Evertype	2015
Old English	Æðelgýðe Ellendǽda on Wundorlande	Alice in Wonderland	Lewis Carroll	Peter S. Baker	Evertype	2015
Old English	Be þam lytlan æþelinge	Le petit prince	Antoine de Saint-Exupéry	Fritz Kemmler	Edition Tintenfaß	2010 (Latin script); 2018 (Anglo-Saxon runes)
Old English	Be Siwarde þam sidfeaxan	Der Struwwelpeter	Heinrich Hoffmann	Fritz Kemmler	Edition Tintenfaß	2010
Old English	Petres Haran Saga	The Tale of Peter Rabbit, The Tale of the Flopsy Bunnies, The Story of a Fierce Bad Rabbit	Beatrix Potter	A. A. Brunn	Fyrnlore Bookmearsing	2018
Middle English	The Aventures of Alys in Wondyr Lond	Alice in Wonderland	Lewis Carroll	Brian S. Lee	Evertype	2013
Middle English	The litel prynce	Le petit prince	Antoine de Saint-Exupéry	Walter Sauer	Edition Tintenfaß	2008
Old High German	Dher luzzilfuristo	Le petit prince	Antoine de Saint-Exupéry	Regine Froschauer	Edition Tintenfaß	2009
Middle High German	Daz prinzelîn	Le petit prince	Antoine de Saint-Exupéry	Helmut Birkhan	Edition Tintenfaß	2008
Middle High German	Der Strûbel-Pêter	Der Struwwelpeter	Heinrich Hoffmann	Helmut Birkhan	Edition Tintenfaß	2008
Old French	Li juenes princes	Le petit prince	Antoine de Saint-Exupéry	Gérard Taverdet	Edition Tintenfaß	2017
Old French	La geste d'Aalis el Païs de Merveilles	Alice in Wonderland	Lewis Carroll	May Plouzeau	Evertype	2017
Old Turkic	𐰚𐰇𐰲𐰜 𐰯𐰃𐰼𐰀𐰤𐰾 Küçük Prens	Le petit prince	Antoine de Saint-Exupéry	Ferhar Çınar	Panama Yayıncılık	2016
Ottoman Turkish	كوچوك پره نس (Küçük prens) (2015) كوچك پرنس (Küçʼk prʼns) (2017) كوچوك پرنس (Küçük prʼns) (2017)	Le petit prince	Antoine de Saint-Exupéry	Fahrettin Arslan & Mehmet Can (2015); Sezer Erdoğan (2017); Öykü Özer (2017)	Hece Yayınları (2015); Karbon Kitaplar (2017); Panama Yayıncılık (2017)	2015; 2017; 2017
Coptic	Ⲡⲓϩⲟⲡⲟⲗⲟⲛ Ⲉⲧϩⲏⲡ	The Secret Weapon	Jessy Carlisle	Philippe Zaher	Michael Raymond Astle	2024

== Comic books ==
Target language	Translation title	Original title	Original author	Translator	Publisher	Date
Ancient Greek	Αστερικιος εν Ολυμπια	Astérix aux Jeux Olympiques	Goscinny, René	I. Kakrides Fanis	Mammouth	1992
Ancient Greek	Μεταξυ ροδου και ξιφους	La Rose et le Glaive	Uderzo, Albert	I. Kakrides Fanis	Mammouth	1993
Ancient Greek	Αστερικιος και Κλεοπατρα	Astérix et Cléopâtre	Goscinny, René	I. Kakrides Fanis	Mammouth	1998
Ancient Greek	Asterix παρα Σακχαραζαδι	Astérix chez Rahàzade	Uderzo, Albert	I. Kakrides Fanis	Mammouth	2006
Ancient Greek	Alix: Ὁ Ἀθηναιος παις	Alix: L'enfant grec	Jacques Martin		Tournai: ELI / Castermann	1988
Ancient Greek	ΒΕΝΩΡ ΕΛΛΗΝΙΣΤΙ	Stories by Famous Authors Illustrated #11: Ben Hur		Bedwere	Lulu.com	2017

== See also ==
- List of Latin translations of modern literature
- List of recent original works in Ancient Greek
- List of recent original books in Latin
