= Cuibul salamandrelor =

- Directed by: Mircea Drăgan
- Written by: Ioan Grigorescu
- Produced by: Mircea Mohor; Dick Randall
- Starring: Stuart Whitman; Woody Strode; Ray Milland; Gheorghe Dinică
- Cinematography: Gheorghe Cristea
- Edited by: Lucia Anton
- Music by: Gino Peguri
- Release date: 1977
- Running time: 90 minutes
- Countries: Romania; Italy
- Languages: Romanian; English

Cuibul salamandrelor, also known as Oil! and Oil - The Billion Dollar Fire, is a 1977 Romanian-Italian action film directed by Mircea Drăgan. It is a loose sequel to Drăgan's 1973 Explozia with the characters of Salamander and Professor Luca returning.

== Plot ==
International oil conglomerate Consolidated Oil covertly sets fire to oil wells at Abu Lambeth in an unspecified North African country because their government won't comply with their demands. Due to the extent of the damage, oil prices rise sharply. Consolidated Oil president Mr. Stewart (Ray Milland) sends in American oil well firefighter John Carter (Stuart Whitman) to deflect suspicion. However, when Carter arrives on location, Consolidated representative Peter Mann (William Berger) hinders his efforts and implies to him that the fire was started on purpose. Meanwhile the African government has called the Rompetrol for assistance. In response a Romanian firefighting crew led by "Salamander" Oprișan (Gheorghe Dinică) and industrial scientist Lupa (Radu Beligan) with more enthusiasm than experience are flown in. Assisting Carter and local engineers Ben (Woody Strode) and Ahmed Aziz (Tony Kendall) they find proof of arson. Eventually the firefighters succeed in quenching the blazes, saving the Abu Lambeth field despite Mann's efforts at sabotage. The international news media exposes the conspiracy and Stewart is unmasked as one of the driving forces behind the scheme. He learns that he is to be a scapegoat and is then murdered. His secretary is not only unsurprised when she is informed of his death, but she has already written his obituary. Meanwhile, Carter and the Romanian firefighters are publicly celebrated by the local residents.

== Cast ==
- Ray Milland as The Boss (Mr Stewart)
- Stuart Whitman as John Carter
- Gheorghe Dinică as George Oprișan aka "Salamander"
- Radu Beligan as Professor Luca
- Woody Strode as Ben
- Florin Piersic as Dan
- Tony Kendall as Ahmed Aziz (Tony in the German version)
- William Berger as Peter Mann
- Jean Constantin as Jean
- Roberto Messina as Fred
- Mircea Diaconu as Grigore
- Gordon Mitchell as Joe
- Valentin Plătăreanu as Ionescu
- Mihai Boghiță as Mihal
- Paola Senatore as Diana Astor
- Constantin Dinulescu as Consolidated Oil Doctor
- Ioana Drăgan as Stewart's Secretary

== Production ==
Director Mircea Drăgan's 1973 disaster drama Explozia had been a success, resulting in negotiations for an internationally-produced sequel. American producer Dick Randall's Spectacular Film Productions ultimately co-produced with Romanian Casa de Filme 5. Stuart Whitman found shooting a Romanian film problematic because extras would talk during rehearsals and takes. When Whitman complained to the assistant director, who then reported the issue to the director, he returned telling him to continue or they would shoot him. From that point on, Whitman accepted the work conditions.

== DVD release ==
A PAL version has been released as Fireforce (Brennendes Inferno) by a company called Elfra. It includes an English and a German-language version as well as filmographies.
