= War in the Kitchen =

2001 film

- Directed by: Marius Barna
- Starring: Gheorghe Dinică; Ovidiu Niculescu
- Release date: 2001
- Country: Romania
- Language: Romanian

War in the Kitchen (Romanian: Război în bucătărie) is a Romanian film drama by Marius Theodor Barna. The film was produced in 2001 by Ager Film in collaboration with Televiziunea Română (TVR). It stars Gheorghe Dinică as the main actor.
