= Lupeni 29 =

1962 film

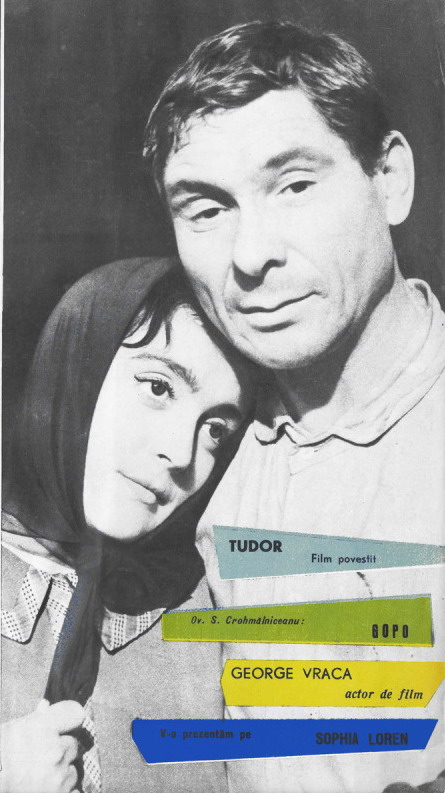
- Still from the film (featuring Lica Gheorghiu and Colea Răutu)
- Directed by: Mircea Drăgan
- Starring: Lica Gheorghiu
- Cinematography: Aurel Samson
- Release date: 1962
- Running time: 118 minutes
- Country: Romania
- Language: Romanian

Lupeni 29 is a 1962 Romanian drama film about the Lupeni strike of 1929, directed by Mircea Drăgan. It was entered into the 3rd Moscow International Film Festival where it won a Silver Prize.

== Cast ==
- Lica Gheorghiu as Ioana
- Colea Răutu as Petre Letean
- George Calboreanu as Tudor Baci
- Ștefan Ciubotărașu as Varga
- Ilarion Ciobanu as Dăneț
- George Măruță as the Mine Director
- Fory Etterle as the Prosecutor
- Toma Dimitriu as the Gendarmerie officer
- Sandu Sticlaru as Mihăilă
- Boris Ciornei as the Officer Poet
- George Motoi as Ioana's first husband
- Constantin Rauțchi as Hudici
- Dumitru Furdui as Mirică
