= Mircea Drăgan =

Romanian film director

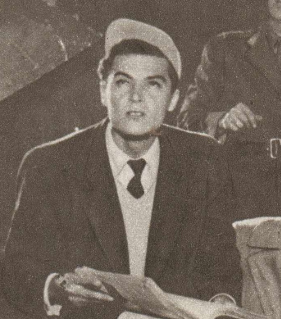
- Born: 3 October 1932; Gura Ocniței, Romania
- Died: 31 October 2017 (aged 85); Râmnicu Vâlcea, Romania
- Burial place: Cetățuia Cemetery, Râmnicu Vâlcea
- Occupation: Film director
- Years active: 1955-1992

Mircea Drăgan (3 October 1932 – 31 October 2017) was a Romanian film director. He directed 23 films between 1955 and 1992. His 1961 film Thirst was entered into the 2nd Moscow International Film Festival where it won the Silver Prize. Two years later, his film Lupeni 29 was entered into the 3rd Moscow International Film Festival and it also won the Silver Prize. He was a member of the jury at the 4th Moscow International Film Festival. His 1973 film Explosion was entered into the 8th Moscow International Film Festival where it won a Diploma.

== Filmography ==
- Dincolo de brazi (1958) (with Mihai Iacob)
- Setea (1961)
- Lupeni 29 (1963)
- Neamul Șoimăreștilor (1965)
- Golgota (1966)
- The Column (1968)
- Brigada Diverse intră în acțiune (1970)
- Brigada Diverse în alertă! (1971)
- B.D. la munte și la mare (1971)
- Explozia (1973)
- Frații Jderi (1974)
- Ștefan cel Mare - Vaslui 1475 (1974–75)
- Cuibul salamandrelor (1977)
- Aurel Vlaicu (1978)
- The Arms of Venus (1979)
- O lume fără cer (1981)
- Plecarea Vlasinilor (1983)
- Întoarcerea Vlasinilor (1984)
- Raliul (1984)
- Cucoana Chirița (1987)
- Chirița în Iași (1988)
- Atac în bibliotecă (1992)
- Transylvania (2006)
