= Izbiceni =

- Commune
- Coat of arms

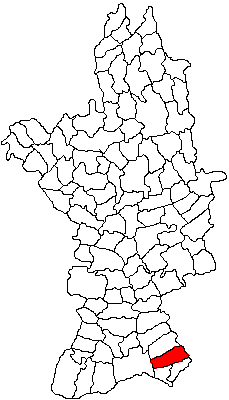
- Location in Olt County

- Location in Romania
- Coordinates: 43°49′14″N 24°39′39″E
- Country: Romania
- County: Olt

Government
  - Mayor (2024–2028): Fănel Bădici (USR)
- Area: 51.41 km^{2} (19.85 sq mi)
- Highest elevation: 48.2 m (158 ft)
- Lowest elevation: 31.9 m (105 ft)
- Population (2021-12-01): 4,120
  - Density: 80.1/km^{2} (208/sq mi)
- Time zone: UTC+02:00 (EET)
  - Summer (DST): UTC+03:00 (EEST)
- Postal code: 237230
- Vehicle reg.: OT
- Website: www.izbiceniolt.ro

Izbiceni is a commune in Olt County, Oltenia, Romania. It is composed of a single village, Izbiceni.

The commune is situated at the southern edge of the Wallachian Plain, on the right bank of the Olt River, close to where the river flows into the Danube.

Izbiceni is located in the southeastern extremity of Olt County, 84 km (52 mi) south of the county seat, Slatina. The nearest town is Corabia, a port on the Danube, 14 km (8.7 mi) to the west. Teleorman County is on the left side of the Olt, with the port city of Turnu Măgurele 25 km (16 mi) to the southeast.

== Natives ==
- Franț Țandără (1930–2004), convicted killer and self-described torturer for the Securitate
