= Radu Beligan =

Romanian actor (1918–2016)

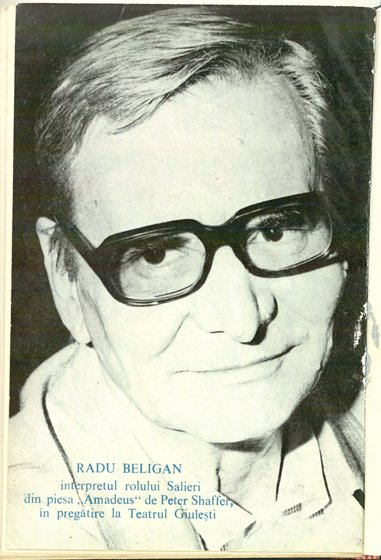
- Radu Beligan in 1956
- Born: 14 December 1918; Galbeni, Bacău County, Romania
- Died: 20 July 2016 (aged 97) "Elias" Hospital, Bucharest, Romania
- Resting place: Bellu Cemetery
- Occupations: Actor, director, essayist
- Years active: 1937–2016
- Political party: PCR (1962–1989)
- Spouses: Nineta Gusti; Dana Crivăț; Marica Beligan
- Children: 4
- Awards: Order of the Star of Romania, Grand Cross class

Radu Beligan (Romanian pronunciation: [ˈradu beliˈɡan]; 14 December 1918 – 20 July 2016) was a Romanian actor, director, and essayist, with an activity of over 70 years in theatre, film, television, and radio. On 15 December 2013, confirmed by Guinness World Records, the actor received the title of "The oldest active theatre actor" on the planet. He was elected honorary member of the Romanian Academy in 2004.

One of the disciples of actress Lucia Sturdza-Bulandra and writer Eugène Ionesco, Radu Beligan is generally regarded as one of the major names of the Romanian theatre with a complex repertoire, classic and modern. He played alongside important actors, with performances both in the country and abroad.

== Biography ==
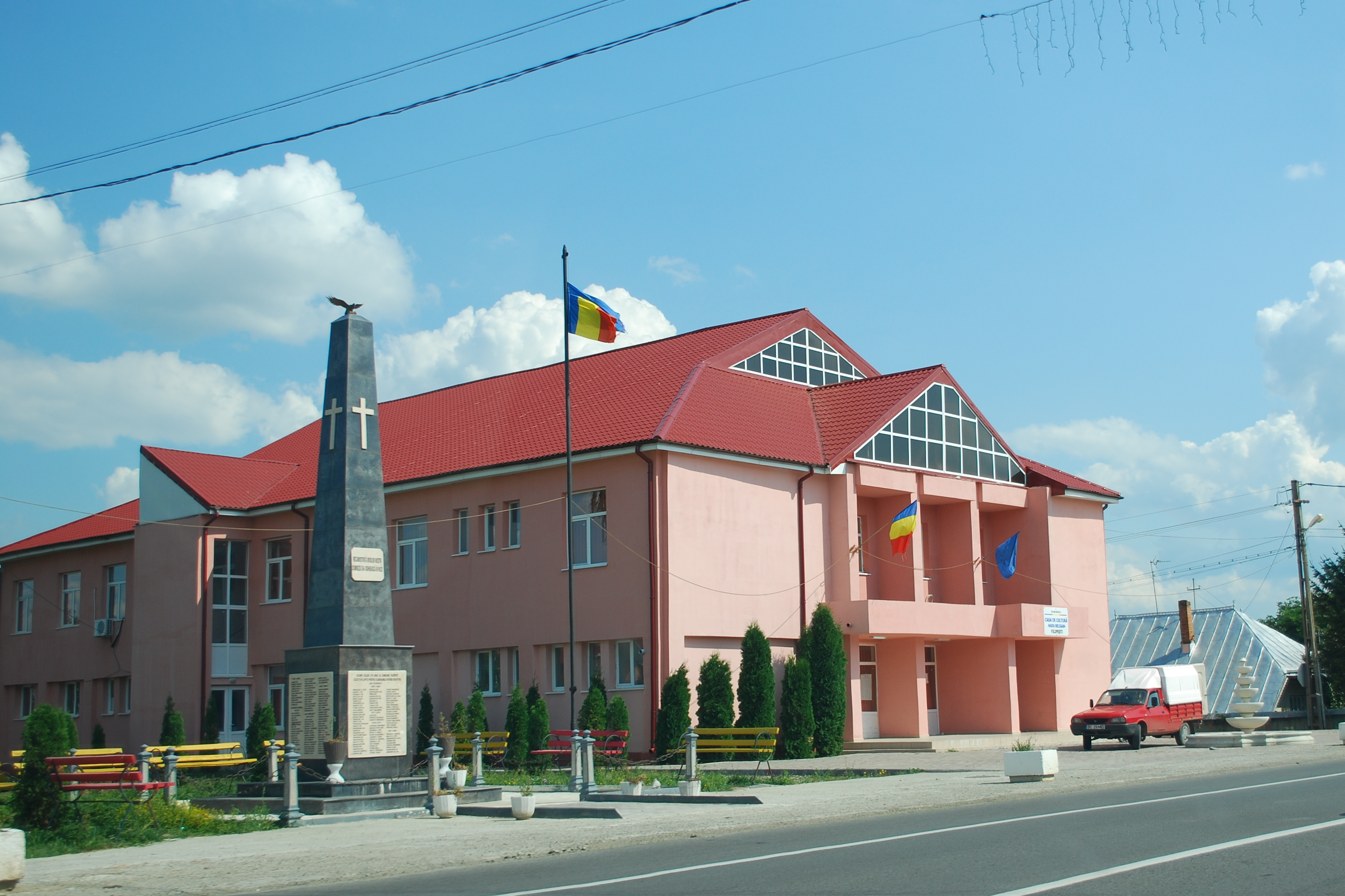
Radu Beligan cultural center in Filipești, his native commune

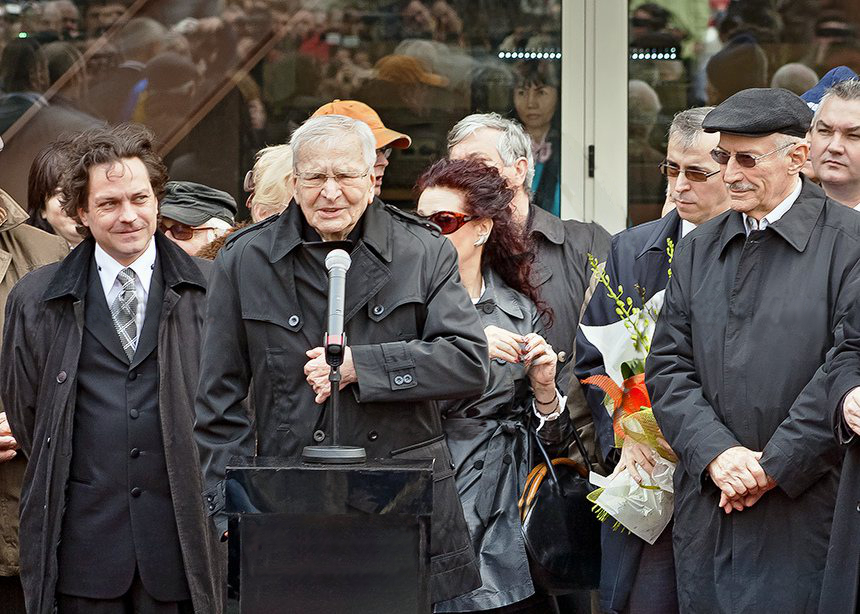
Beligan receiving a star on Walk of Fame Bucharest, 28 March 2011

Beligan was born in Galbeni, a village in the commune of Filipești, Bacău County, to a Romanian father and a mother of Greek origins.

In an interview for toateartele.com in 2011, Radu Beligan declared that his paternal grandmother, Ecaterina Beligan, is the cousin of writer Ion Creangă. His mother, Eufrosina Moscopol, comes from the Greek family Moscopol, relating with famous interwar singer Jean Moscopol.

After graduating from the Costache Negruzzi High School in Iași in 1937, he made his artistic studies at the Royal Academy of Music and Dramatic Art in Bucharest, where he was the student of Lucia Sturdza-Bulandra, one of the great figures of Romanian scene. Between 1937 and 1938 he also studied law and philosophy at the University of Bucharest, using college scholarship offered to pay his taxes at the Conservatory.

== Family ==
His first wife was Nineta Gusti, an actress, with whom he was married for fifteen years. His second wife was Dana Crivăț (1933–2012), with whom he has a daughter, Ana Maria, a writer; both mother and daughter defected to Germany in 1982 and emigrated to Australia the same year. His third wife was Marica Beligan (died 1993), a writer, with whom he has three children: Lamia (born 1966), an actress, Raluca and Alexandru, employee of the National Bank of Romania.

== Political activity ==
Radu Beligan was a member of the Central Committee of the Romanian Communist Party between 1969 and 1989 and deputy of the Great National Assembly between 1961 and 1975.

== Career ==
He debuted in theatre at the age of 20 years, in the play Crime and Punishment after Fyodor Dostoyevsky, directed by Mihai Zirra, on the stage of Muncă și Lumină Theatre in Bucharest. His first role in a film was that of A Stormy Night (Romanian: O noapte furtunoasă) after I. L. Caragiale, directed by Jean Georgescu (1943), and the last one The Afternoon of a Torturer (Romanian: După-amiaza unui torționar), directed by Lucian Pintilie (2001).

He was professor at the Institute of Theatre and Film in Bucharest, director of the Comedy Theatre between 1961–1969 and director of the National Theatre between 1969 and 1990.

In 2008, Beligan was awarded the Order of the Star of Romania, Grand Cross class.

== Activity as theatre actor ==
- 2004 The Egoist by Jean Anouilh, directed by Radu Beligan
- 2001 Take, Ianke and Cadîr by Victor Ion Popa, directed by Grigore Gonţa
- 1998 The Name of the Rose adapted from Umberto Eco, directed by Grigore Gonţa
- 1998 Night Asilum by Maxim Gorki, directed by Ion Cojar
- 1998 Pork Chops by Bertrand Blier, directed by Gelu Colceag
- 1997 Supper by Jean-Claude Brinsville
- 1997 The Sunshine Boys by Neil Simon, directed by Ion Lucian
- 1995 Danaidae, directed by Silviu Purcărete
- 1994 Harvey (play) by Mary Chase, directed by Tudor Mărăscu
- 1990 Who's Afraid of Virginia Woolf? by Edward Albee, directed by Mircea Cornişteanu
- 1989 Legacy by Titus Popovici, directed by Horea Popescu and Mihai Manolescu
- 1987 The Double Bass by Patrick Süskind, directed by Grigore Gonţa
- 1984 Hollywood Story by Neil Simon, directed by Grigore Gonţa
- 1982 Amadeus by Peter Shaffer, directed by Dinu Cernescu
- 1981 Filumena Marturano by Eduardo De Filippo
- 1980 Caligula by Albert Camus, directed by Horea Popescu
- 1977 Romulus the Great by Friedrich Dürrenmatt, directed by Sanda Manu
- 1976 A Woman's Life by A.Baranga, directed by A.Baranga
- 1976 Richard III by William Shakespeare, directed by Horea Popescu
- 1974 Danton by Camil Petrescu, directed by Horea Popescu
- 1973 Pathetic Simphony by A.Baranga, directed by A.Baranga
- 1973 The Prisoner of Second Avenue by Neil Simon, directed by Mihail Berechet
- 1971 Holiday Games by Mihail Sebastian, directed by Mihai Berechet
- 1970 Who's Afraid of Virginia Woolf? by Edward Albee, directed by Michel Făgădău
- 1969 Transplant of an Unknown Heart by Al. Mirodan, directed by Moni Ghelerter
- 1968 The Killer by Eugène Ionesco, directed by Lucian Giurchescu
- 1967 Public Opinion by Aurel Baranga, directed by Mihai Berechet
- 1966 The Duck Head by G. Ciprian, directed by David Esrig
- 1964 Rhinoceros by Eugène Ionesco, directed by Lucian Giurchescu
- 1963 Head of the Department of Souls by Al. Mirodan, directed by Moni Ghelerter
- 1962 The Trial of Mr. Caragiale by M. Ştefănescu, directed by David Esrig
- 1961 Famous 702 by Al. Mirodan, directed by Moni Ghelerter
- 1959 Valley of the Cookoo by Mihai Beniuc, directed by Sică Alexandrescu
- 1958 The Tempest by William Shakespeare, directed by Moni Ghelerter
- 1958 Invitation to the Castle by Jean Anouilh, directed by Sică Alexandrescu
- 1958 Enemies by Maxim Gorki, directed by Alexandru Finţi
- 1958 The Black Years by Aurel Baranga, directed by Sică Alexandrescu
- 1957 Recipe for Happiness or What People Don't Talk About by Aurel Baranga, directed by Marietta Sadova
- 1957 The Tyrants by Carlo Goldoni, directed by Sică Alexandrescu
- 1956 Sunset by Barbu Ştefănescu Delavrancea, directed by Marietta Sadova, Mihail Zirra
- 1956 The Journalists by Al. Mirodan, directed by Moni Ghelerter
- 1955 A Personal Matter by Alexandr Stein, directed by Sică Alexandrescu
- 1954 Rabid Lamb by Aurel Baranga, directed by Sică Alexandrescu
- 1954 Platon Krecet by Alexandr Korneiciuk, directed by Alex Finţi
- 1953 Breaking News by Mihail Sebastian, directed by Moni Ghelerter
- 1952 Moments by Ion Luca Caragiale, directed by Sică Alexandrescu
- 1952 The Government Inspector by Nikolai Gogol, directed by Sică Alexandrescu
- 1952 Matei Millo by Mircea Ştefănescu, directed by Sică Alexandrescu
- 1952 Lad from Our Town by Konstantin Simonov, directed by Vlad Mugur
- 1951 Of The Carnival by Ion Luca Caragiale, directed by Sică Alexandrescu
- 1949 A Stormy Night by Ion Luca Caragiale, directed by Sică Alexandrescu
- 1949 Bad Weed by Aurel Baranga, directed by Sică Alexandrescu
- 1949 The Three Sisters by Anton Chekhov, directed by Moni Ghelerter
- 1948 A Lost Letter by Ion Luca Caragiale, directed by Sică Alexandrescu
- 1948 Confrontation by Tur and Lev Seinin, directed by Moni Ghelerter
- 1948 The Great Power by Romaşov, directed by N. Dinescu
- 1947 Three Months of Love by Michel Duran, directed by Mircea Şeptilici
- 1947 Class 8B by Roger Ferdinand, directed by Ionel Ţăranu
- 1947 Family's Shame adapted from Ronald Harwood, directed by Ion Talianu
- 1947 Helen, Tommy and Joe by James Thurbar and Elliott Nugent, directed by Marietta Sadova
- 1946 Vis de secătură by Mircea Ştefănescu, directed by W. Siegfried
- 1946 Life Starts Tomorrow by M.G. Sauvajon, directed by Val Mugur
- 1946 Rocket to the Moon by Clifford Odets, directed by Marietta Sadova
- 1946 Spring Has Come by John Van Druten, directed by Sică Alexandrescu
- 1945 Kiss Me Immediately by Tudor Muşatescu and V.Timuş after J. Vaszari, directed by Ion Talianu
- 1945 Knock by Jules Romains, directed by Sică Alexandrescu
- 1945 A Kidnapped Woman by Louis Verneuil, directed by Sică Alexandrescu
- 1944 Cardboard Lover by Jacques Deval, directed by Sică Alexandrescu
- 1944 The Man Who Has Seen Death by Victor Eftimiu, directed by Sică Alexandrescu
- 1944 The Doctor's Dilemma by George Bernard Shaw, directed by Sică Alexandrescu
- 1944 I Dreamed of Paradise by Guido Cantini, directed by Sică Alexandrescu
- 1944 A Money Man by George S. Kaufman, directed by Sică Alexandrescu
- 1943 Love is a Lonely Child by Tudor Muşatescu after Schwartz and Lengbach, directed by M.Anghelescu
- 1943 Boarding House of Love by Al. Kiriţescu, N.Vlădoianu and Soare Z. Soare, directed by Soare Z. Soare
- 1943 I Don't Drink Anymore by De Flers and Caillavet, directed by Soare Z. Soare
- 1943 The Unnamed Star by Mihail Sebastian, directed by Soare Z.Soare
- 1942 Poor Jonathan by Karl Millöcker
- 1942 Chocolate Lady by Paul Gavault, directed by Ion Şahighian
- 1942 Sextet by Gregor Schmitt, directed by Sică Alexandrescu
- 1940 Titanic Waltz by Tudor Muşatescu, directed by Tudor Muşatescu
- 1940 I Feel Sorry for Myself by André Mouëzy-Éon and Jean Guitton, directed by Ion Sava
- 1940 City with no Lawyers by Nicolae Manzari, directed by Ion Iancovescu
- 1940 The Beautiful Adventure by De Fleurs, Caillavet & Ray, directed by Sică Alexandrescu
- 1940 Smiling Man by Luigi Bonelli and Aldo de Benedetti, directed by Ion Şahighian
- 1939 Magic Horse by Gherardo Gherardi, directed by Ion Iancovescu
- 1939 Close to the Sky by Julien Luchaire, directed by Aurel Ion Maican
- 1939 The Extra by Alfred Savoir, directed by Ion Iancovescu
- 1939 Miss Butterfly by Tudor Muşatescu after Tibor Varady, directed by Tudor Muşatescu
- 1938 Jedermann by Hugo von Hofmannsthal, directed by Victor Ion Popa
- 1938 Merry Days after the War by Mihail Sadoveanu after Eugène Labiche, directed by Victor Ion Popa
- 1938 Quadrature of the Circle by V. Katsiev, directed by Victor Ion Popa
- 1938 Young Age by Swarkin, directed by Muratov/M.Anghelescu
- 1937 Fisher of Shadows by Jean Sarment, directed by Sergiu Dumitrescu
- 1937 The Plague by Ion Marin Sadoveanu
- 1937 Crime and Punishment after Fyodor Dostoevsky, by Gaston Bary, directed by Mihai Zirra

== Filmography ==
- O noapte furtunoasă (1943)
- Visul unei nopți de iarnă (1946)
- Rasuna valea (1949)
- Bulevardul “Fluieră Vântu” - short (1950)
- Lanțul slăbiciunilor (1952)
- O scrisoare pierdută (1953) as Agamemnon Dandanache
- Afacerea Protar (1955) as Professor Andronic
- Directorul nostru (1960)
- Bădăranii (1960) as Felippetto
- Celebrul 702 (1962) - Cheryl
- Lanterne cu amintiri (1963)
- Pași spre lună (1964)
- Castelanii (1966)
- Șeful sectorului suflete (1967) as Gore
- Explozia (1972) as Professor Luca
- Întoarcerea lui Magellan (1974) as Professor
- Agentul straniu (1974)
- Tată de duminică (1975) as Grigore Manta
- Singurătatea florilor (1976) as Ovidiu Pavel
- Cuibul salamandrelor (1976) as Professor Luca
- Instanța amână pronunțarea (1976)
- Premiera (1976) as Mihai Dan
- Povestea dragostei (1977) as Narrator
- Brațele Afroditei (1978)
- Aurel Vlaicu (1977)
- Iancu Jianu, zapciul (1980)
- Rețeaua „S” (1980)
- Iancu Jianu, haiducul (1981)
- Întoarcere la dragostea dintâi (1981)
- Galax, omul păpușă (1983)
- Horea (1984)
- Cui i-e frică de Virginia Woolf? - TV movie (1995) - George
- Trahir (1993) - Vlad
- După-amiaza unui torționar (2001) as Professor
- Inimă de țigan (2007) as Belmondo
- Medalia de onoare (2010) as Ion I. Ion
