= Philipp Winterberg =

German author

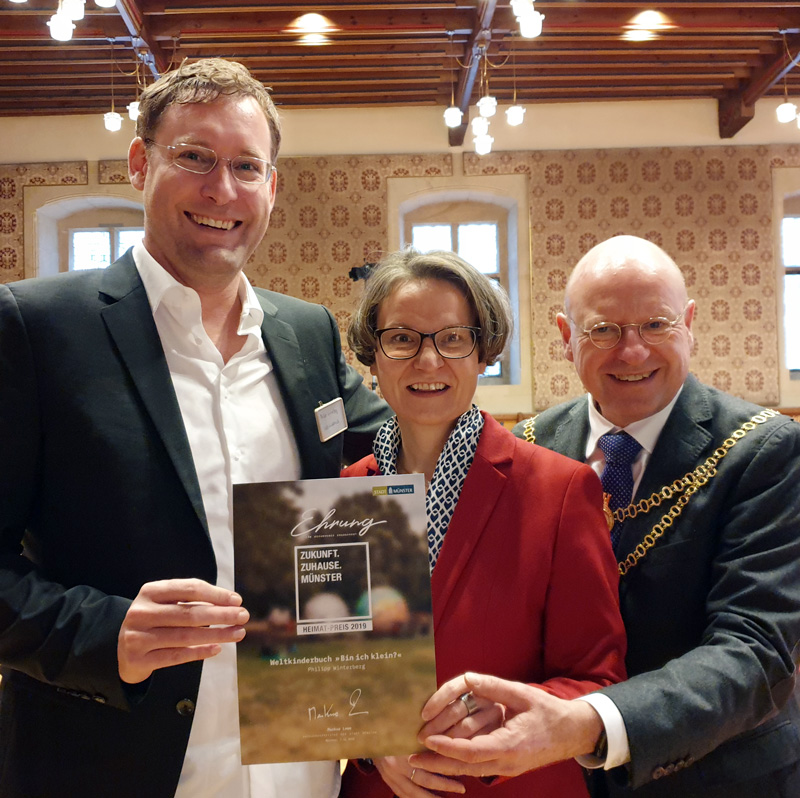
- From left to right: Philipp Winterberg, Ina Scharrenbach and Markus Lewe
- Occupation: Author
- Website: https://www.philippwinterberg.com/

Philipp Winterberg (born in 1978) is a German author. His books have been reviewed and recommended by Kirkus Reviews, Die Tageszeitung, Foreword Reviews, Börsenblatt, Österreichisches Schulportal and many more.

His children's book Am I small? is available for every country on earth in at least one official language making it the world's first "World Children's Book". In 2020, Am I small? was exhibited by the German National Library as the most translated German book of all time (more than 200 languages and dialects).

== Bibliography ==
Selected works from the catalog of the German National Library.

- 2011 – In Here, Out There! (Da rein, da raus!, 70+ languages and dialects)
- 2013 – Die Herleitung von Instrumenten der Einstellungsänderung aus einer Theorie der Einstellung
- 2013 – Am I small? (Bin ich klein?, 220+ languages and dialects)
- 2014 – St. James´ Way in a Tuxedo (Jakobsweg im Smoking)
- 2014 – Drölf: Eine Sch(l)afgeschichte
- 2016 – Just Like Dad/Wie Papa
- 2017 – The Safest Place in the World/Der sicherste Ort der Welt
- 2019 – Trekking-Tipps Nepal & Himalaya

== Adaptations ==
- 2014 – A radio drama adaptation of Drölf was produced by the West German Broadcasting Cologne (WDR 5) in 2014 and aired several times as part of the series Ohrenbär – Radiogeschichten für kleine Leute, Klingendes Bilderbuch, Bärenbude am Abend, etc.
- 2020 – The adaptation of Drölf was published by the working group of public broadcasters of the Federal Republic of Germany (ARD) in 2020 as part of the online series Kinderhörspiel im WDR

== Awards and Prizes ==
- 2014 – Bayern 2-Favorit, Bayerischer Rundfunk
- 2018 – Münster: Vielfalt machen, Münster
- 2019 – Ehrenurkunde beim Heimatpreis 2019, Münster
- 2019 – KIMI-Siegel für Vielfalt in der Kinder- und Jugendliteratur (KIMI Longseller), KIMI-Jurys
