= Romulus the Great =

Play by Friedrich Dürrenmatt

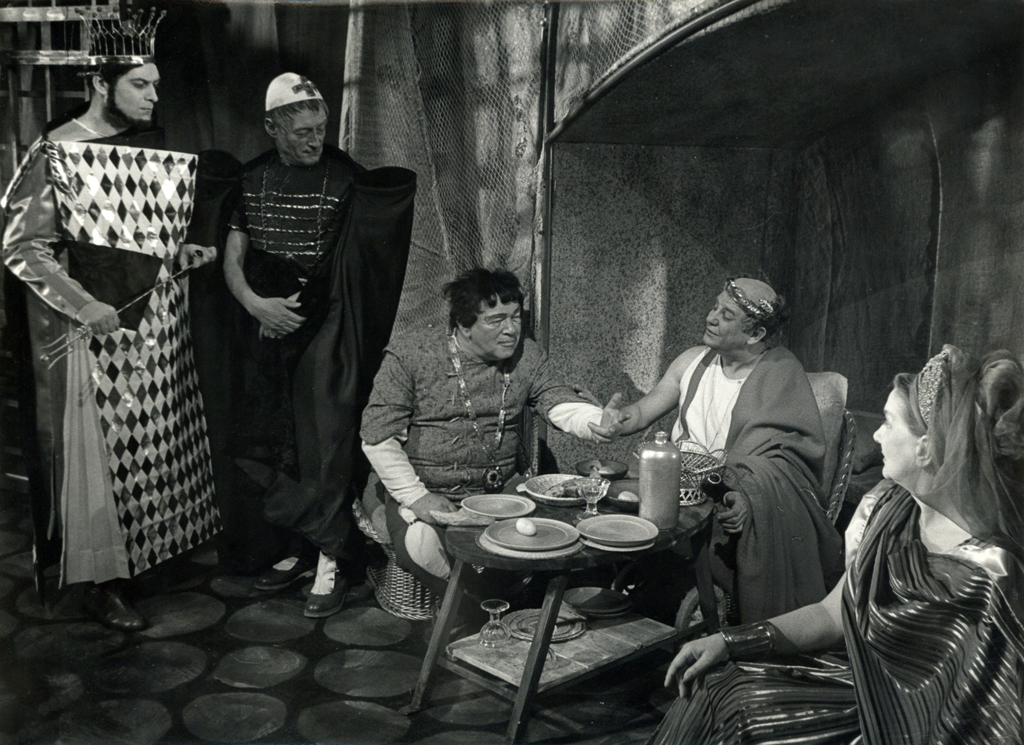
The play by the Ljubljana Drama Theatre in 1962

Friedrich Dürrenmatt's play Romulus der Große (Romulus the Great, 1950) shows the demise of the Western Roman Empire in the 5th century, taking place during the day of (and the day following) the Ides of March, 476.

The Emperor Romulus Augustulus calmly expected the ruin of the Empire. Despite the attempts of his ministers and courtiers to force the emperor to take decisive steps against the increasing peril of the Germanic invasion, Romulus preferred to stay at home breeding domesticated chickens and not take action in response to the threat.

== Plot ==
Act one

The soldier Spurius Titus Mamma arrives at Romulus's run-down country residence, bleeding and exhausted, having ridden day and night to inform the Emperor of the fall of Pavia. Romulus is eventually to be found bartering over the sale of the busts of some of Rome's greatest historical figures. Romulus refuses to receive the news brought to him, instead insisting that Spurius Titus Mamma go to sleep while he is having breakfast. Meanwhile, the Emperor of the Eastern Roman Empire, Zeno, arrives, whose Byzantine Empire has been flooded with German ranks. His initiative is that both sides of Rome unite to fight, yet on seeing Romulus's complacency, he soon decides he would rather set his resistance campaign in motion from Alexandria, whence he resolves to sail the following day. At this point, the rich German trouser manufacturer Caesar Rupf arrives, offering to pay the Germanic forces 10 million sestertii in return for a retreat, yet only if he can take the Princess Rea as his bride. Romulus refuses this, stating he would readily sell the Empire for a handful of sestertii, but he will not sell his daughter.

Act two

The remaining secretaries of the Empire gather in the Villa's Park, musing on the impending destruction of the Empire and contemplating begging Romulus to resume reigning and defeat the Germanic people. Meanwhile, tortured, scalped, thin and pale, Emilian, fiancé of Rea, arrives after spending three years in German captivity. Patriotic, he is disgusted at the Emperor's "dirty henhouse". During the meeting, the Princess does not recognise him. He eventually reveals his identity, but speaks only of his former self, as if he were now a ghost. Rea, of course, still loves the man to whom she was engaged three years ago, which Emilian sees and takes advantage of, demanding her to "take a knife" and herself struggle against the Germans. Hearing of Caesar Rupf's offer, Emilian tells Rea that she must marry the trouser manufacturer because she loves him and he can demand this of her. The assembled, thinking the Empire has been rescued, break out joyfully. However, Romulus will not grant permission for the marriage to take place.

The first signs of Romulus's darker purpose emerge here:

"My daughter will comply with the will of the Emperor. The Emperor knows what he does when he throws his realm into the fire, lets fall what must be destroyed, and grinds with his foot what belongs to the earth."

Act three

The night of the Ides of March. Romulus is visited in his bedchamber by the Empress Julia, who informs him of her plan to flee to Sicily. Romulus refuses to accompany her or to reconsider his decision to forbid Rea's marriage to Rupf. It becomes clear here that Julia and Romulus never loved one another. Instead, each used the marriage for his purpose. Julia wished to attain the status of Empress, and so married the well-descended Romulus. Romulus, however, married into the ruling bloodline with the sole purpose of liquidating a nation whose nature had become too bloody and violent to justify defence. Later that night, Rea also visits her father, whom he persuades to pursue her engagement to Emilian, for

"it is much greater and harder to be faithful to a person than to the State."

Meanwhile, a cloaked figure slips in through the window and waits in the darkness. Romulus sees this in the reflection on his wineglass and once Rea has gone, calls out to the figure, Emilian, to reveal himself. From here, further conspirators are concealed in absurd places in Romulus's bedchamber: the Home Secretary under the divan, Zeno in the cupboard, Spurius Titus Mamma in the wardrobe, all cloaked in black and bearing daggers.

Yet even this last try for revolution against Romulus goes awry. Romulus is unmoved; he is only surprised to learn that his Cook is one of the sworn traitors. The group flees as soon as news is shouted at them that a Germanic army has arrived, abandoning their plot and leaving Romulus to await his death at the hands of the German Prince Odoacer.

Act four

Romulus awakens on the morning following the Ides of March. News is brought to him that his two butlers have been offered positions serving Caesar Rupf, with excellent pay, and that the raft carrying Rea, Julia, Emilian, the Home Secretary, the War Minister and the Cook capsized, drowning all those aboard except Zeno. Romulus receives this news stoically, declining to mourn, anticipating his impending death. As Odoacer enters the Villa, Romulus has to see he is tragically mistaken - his adversary is as world-weary as himself, having been forced into a bloody streak of conquest by his people, especially his bloodthirsty nephew Theoderic. Instead of coming to kill Romulus, Odoacer begs him for help. Each tries to surrender to the other.

Both eventually conclude that they have been trying to preside over the world, when their only control is over the present. Odoacer admits that Theoderic will one day depose him if he continues to rule. Nonetheless, he yields to the title "King of Italy," bestowing upon Romulus a pension of 6,000 gold coins per year and a countryside villa where he must live with his folly for the rest of his life.

== Historical accuracy ==
Dürrenmatt took some rather great liberties in describing the historical story - in reality, Romulus Augustulus was just a child who spent only a few months in power and depended heavily upon his father, Orestes. Poultry-rearing was a habit not of Romulus, but of an earlier emperor, Honorius. Odoacer and Theoderic, on the other hand, were not family but rather leaders of two quarreling Germanic tribes. Dürrenmatt, of course, did not seek historical accuracy and even gave the play the following subheading: “Ungeschichtliche historische Komödie” (Unhistorical historical comedy).

== Adaptations ==
- The play was televised in 1965, in black & white, by Helmut Käutner for a West-German audience. Romuald Pekny starred as Romulus.
- American novelist and essayist Gore Vidal adapted the play as Romulus in 1962.
