= Wintersbourg =

- Commune
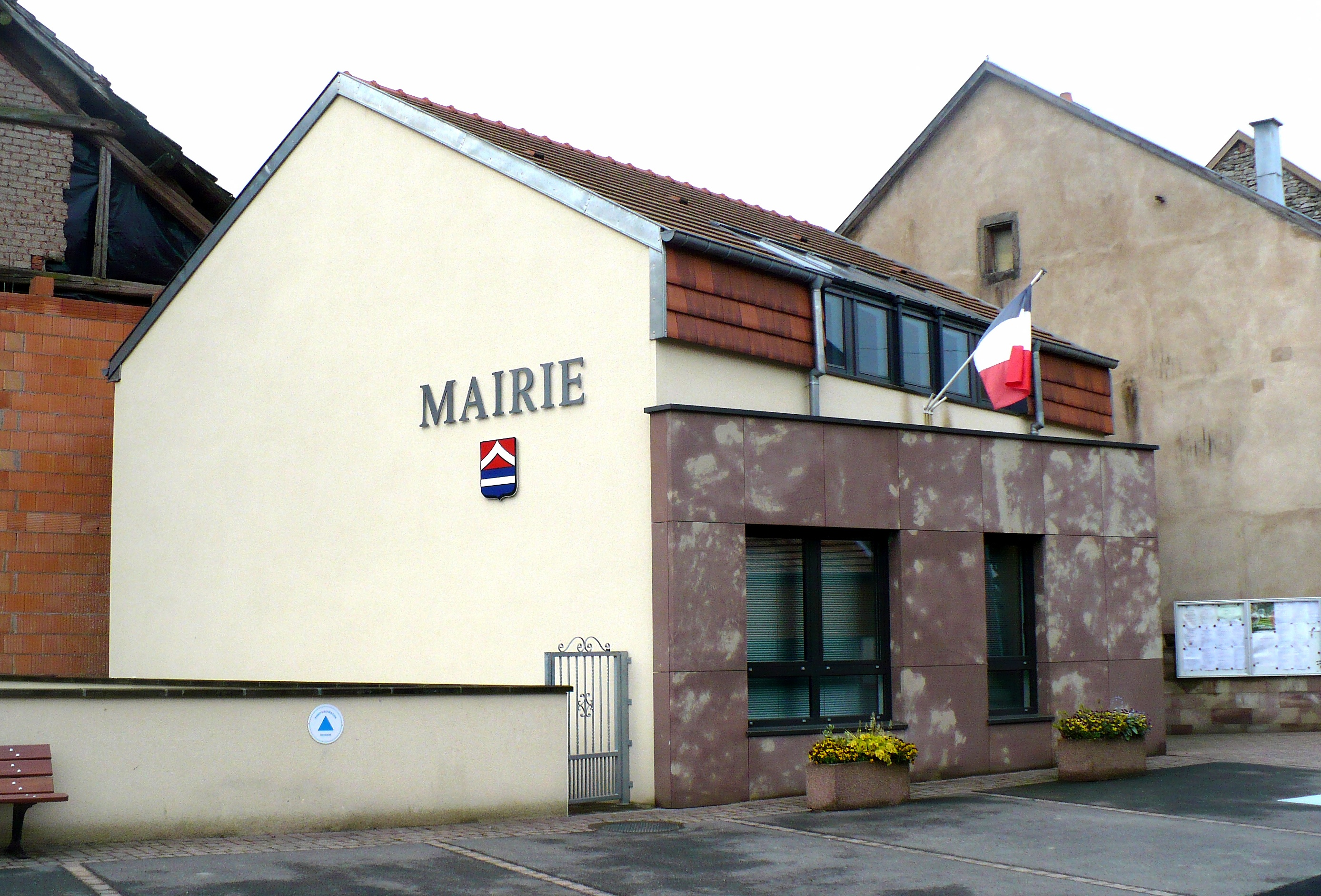
- The town hall in Wintersbourg

- Coat of arms
- Location of Wintersbourg
- Location within France Location within Grand Est
- Coordinates: 48°47′12″N 7°11′25″E
- Country: France
- Region: Grand Est
- Department: Moselle
- Arrondissement: Sarrebourg-Château-Salins
- Canton: Phalsbourg
- Intercommunality: Pays de Phalsbourg

Government
  - Mayor (2020–2026): André Soulier
- Area^{1}: 3.95 km^{2} (1.53 sq mi)
- Elevation: 333 m (1,093 ft)
- Highest elevation: 334 m (1,096 ft)
- Lowest elevation: 254 m (833 ft)
- Population (2023): 262
  - Density: 66.3/km^{2} (172/sq mi)
- Time zone: UTC+01:00 (CET)
  - Summer (DST): UTC+02:00 (CEST)
- INSEE/Postal code: 57747 /57635
- ^{1} French Land Register data, which excludes lakes, ponds, glaciers > 1 km^{2} (0.386 sq mi or 247 acres) and river estuaries.

Wintersbourg (German: Wintersburg) is a commune in the Moselle department in Grand Est in north-eastern France.

== Population ==
Historical population
Year	Pop.	±% p.a.
1968	214	—
1975	217	+0.20%
1982	188	−2.03%
1990	164	−1.69%
1999	180	+1.04%
2007	220	+2.54%
2012	268	+4.03%
2017	265	−0.22%
2023	262	−0.19%
Source: INSEE

== See also ==
- Communes of the Moselle department
