= List of Romanian historical films =

The list of Romanian historical films groups historical drama film and TV productions by the Romanian cinema. Historical films are a genre in which stories are based upon historical events and famous persons. Some films attempt to accurately portray a historical event or biography, to the degree that the available historical research will allow, while others are fictionalized tales that are based on an actual person and their deeds.

The action in the majority of the films is set in the region of modern Romania.

Title	Original title	Release year	Time period	Events	Personalities	External
Aferim!	Aferim!	2015	1810	Romani slavery		Aferim! at IMDb
Am fost șaisprezece	Am fost șaisprezece	1979	1944-1945	Siege of Budapest		Am fost 16 at IMDb
Avram Iancu împotriva imperiului	Avram Iancu împotriva imperiului	2024	1848	docudrama: Revolution of 1848 in Romania	Avram Iancu	Avram Iancu Împotriva imperiului at IMDb
The Hatchet	Baltagul	1969	1930			Baltagul at IMDb
Bătălia din umbră	Bătălia din umbră	1986	1917			Bătălia din umbră at IMDb
Brâncuși	Brâncuși	1996	1876-1957	Documentary: biography of sculptor Constantin Brâncuși	Constantin Brâncuși	Brâncuși at IMDb
Burebista	Burebista	1980	70–44 BC	Consolidation of the Dacian Kingdom, Third Servile War	Burebista, Julius Caesar, Deceneus, Akornion, Comosicus, Spartacus (mentioned)	Burebista at IMDb, Cinemagia
The Mace with Three Seals	Buzduganul cu trei peceți	1973	1595-1600		Mihai Viteazul, Doamna Stanca, Nicolae Pătrașcu, Andrew Báthory, Sigismund Báthory, Maria Christina, Princess of Transylvania, Ștefan Răzvan, Simion Movilă	The Mace with Three Seals at IMDb
Cantemir	Cantemir	1973	1695-1710		Dimitrie Cantemir, Peter the Great, Ahmed III, Ion Neculce	Cantemir at IMDb
Mercenaries' Trap	Capcana mercenarilor	1981	1918			Mercenaries' Trap at IMDb
Carol I	Carol I - Un destin pentru România	2009	1914	documentary	Carol I of Romania, Elisabeth of Wied	Carol I at IMDb
Ciprian Porumbescu	Ciprian Porumbescu	1973	1860-1883	life of composer Ciprian Porumbescu	Ciprian Porumbescu	Ciprian Porumbescu at IMDb
Colierul de turcoaze	Colierul de turcoaze	1986	1847		Gheorghe Bibescu, Cezar Bolliac	Colierul de turcoaze at IMDb
The Column	Columna	1968	106 AD	Trajan's Dacian Wars	Trajan, Decebalus	Columna at IMDb
Comoara	Comoara	1983	1532			Comoara at IMDb
The Crown of Fire	Coroana de foc	1990	1330-1340	after a Medieval legend		The Crown of Fire at IMDb
The Dacians	Dacii	1967	84–89 AD	Domitian's Dacian War	Decebalus, Domitian	The Dacians at IMDb
Darclée	Darclée	1960	1880-1921	life of operatic soprano Hariclea Darclée	Hariclea Darclée, Ruggero Leoncavallo, Giacomo Puccini	Darclée at IMDb
Doi bărbați pentru o moarte	Doi bărbați pentru o moarte	1970	1944			Doi bărbați pentru o moarte at IMDb
Chained Justice	Dreptate în lanțuri	1984	1911-1914	story of hajduk Toader Pantelimon		Chained Justice at IMDb
Drumeț în calea lupilor	Drumeț în calea lupilor	1988	1940	Assassination of Nicolae Iorga	Nicolae Iorga, Horia Sima	Drumeț în calea lupilor at IMDb
Drumul oaselor	Drumul oaselor	1980	1845		Gheorghe Bibescu	Drumul oaselor at IMDb
Ecaterina Teodoroiu	Ecaterina Teodoroiu	1978	1916-1917		Ecaterina Teodoroiu, Octavian Goga	Ecaterina Teodoroiu at IMDb
Enescu, skinned alive	Enescu, jupuit de viu	2024	1910-1955	life of composer George Enescu	George Enescu, Maria Tescanu Rosetti	Enescu, skinned alive at IMDb
Squadriglia bianca	Escadrila albă	1944	1941-1943			Squadriglia bianca at IMDb
Falansterul	Falansterul	1979	1835-1836	Scăieni Phalanstery	Teodor Diamant	Falansterul at IMDb
Frații Jderi	Frații Jderi	1974	1470	Battle of Lipnic	Stephen III of Moldavia	Frații Jderi at IMDb
Gata Oricând!: Eroii de la podul Jiului	Gata Oricând!: Eroii de la podul Jiului	2022	1916			Gata Oricând: partea întâi - Eroii de la podul Jiului at IMDb
Haiducii	Haiducii	1966	1800			Haiducii at IMDb
Haiducii lui Șaptecai	Haiducii lui Șaptecai	1971	1816		Anghel Șaptecai, Ioan Gheorghe Caragea, Domnița Ralu Caragea	Haiducii lui Șaptecai at IMDb
Horea	Horea	1984	1784	Revolt of Horea, Cloșca, and Crișan	Horea, Cloșca, Crișan, Joseph II, Holy Roman Emperor	Horea at IMDb
Iancu Jianu haiducul	Iancu Jianu haiducul	1981	1809-1821		Iancu Jianu, Ioan Gheorghe Caragea, Tudor Vladimirescu, Domnița Ralu Caragea	Iancu Jianu haiducul at IMDb
Iancu Jianu, the Tax Collector	Iancu Jianu zapciul	1980	1808-1809		Iancu Jianu, Ioan Gheorghe Caragea, Tudor Vladimirescu	Iancu Jianu, the Tax Collector at IMDb
The Independence of Romania	Independenţa României	1912	1877–1878	Romanian War of Independence, Russo-Turkish War (1877–1878)	Carol I, Alexander II of Russia, Osman Pasha, Peneş Curcanul	Independenta Romaniei at IMDb, Cinemagia
Iubire elenă	Iubire elenă	2012	1849–1880		Eleni Boukoura-Altamoura, Francesco Saverio Altamura, Jane Benham Hay	Iubire elenă at IMDb
I Do Not Care If We Go Down in History as Barbarians	Îmi este indiferent dacă în istorie vom intra ca barbari	2018	1941	about Siege of Odessa		I Do Not Care If We Go Down in History as Barbarians at IMDb
Oglinda	Începutul adevărului	1993	1939–1945	Romania during World War II, 1944 Romanian coup d'état	Ion Antonescu, Mihai Antonescu, Michael I of Romania, Iuliu Maniu, Lucrețiu Pătrășcanu, Petru Groza, Constantin Sănătescu, Dinu Brătianu, Gheorghe Brătianu	Oglinda at IMDb
Întoarcerea lui Vodă Lăpușneanu	Întoarcerea lui Vodă Lăpușneanu	1980	1564-1568		Alexandru Lăpușneanu, Doamna Ruxandra, Doamna Chiajna, Iacob Heraclid	Întoarcerea lui Vodă Lăpușneanu at IMDb
At the Crossroads of Great Storms	La răscrucea marilor furtuni	1980	1848	Revolution of 1848 in Romania	Gheorghe Bibescu, Ion Heliade Rădulescu, Cezar Bolliac, Ana Ipătescu, Christian Tell, Golescu Arăpilă, Nicolae Bălcescu, Ion C. Brătianu, Maria Rosetti, Neofit al II-lea, Popa Șapcă, Simion Bărnuțiu, Axente Sever, C. A. Rosetti, Andrei Șaguna, Avram Iancu, Alecu Russo	At the Crossroads of Great Storms at IMDb
Marea sfidare	Marea sfidare	1990	1939	Invasion of Poland		Marea sfidare at IMDb
Queen Marie of Romania	Maria, Regina României	2019	1919	Queen Marie at Paris Peace Conference 1919	Marie of Romania, Ferdinand I of Romania, Ion I.C. Brătianu, Carol II of Romania, Princess Ileana of Romania, Maria of Yugoslavia,	Queen Marie of Romania at IMDb
The Silver Mask	Masca de argint	1985	1846		Gheorghe Bibescu, Ion Heliade Rădulescu, Cezar Bolliac	Masca de argint at IMDb
Michael the Brave	Mihai Viteazul	1970	1593–1601		Mihai Viteazul, Doamna Stanca, Nicolae Pătrașcu, Andrew Báthory, Sigismund Báthory, Maria Christina, Princess of Transylvania, Koca Sinan Pasha	Michael the Brave at IMDb
Mircea	Mircea	1989	1386–1418	Battle of Rovine, Battle of Nicopolis	Mircea cel Bătrân, Mehmed I, Vlad III the Impaler	Mircea at IMDb
Misterele Bucureștilor	Misterele Bucureștilor	1983	1846		Gheorghe Bibescu, Marițica Bibescu, Constantin Alexandru Rosetti, Cezar Bolliac, Nicolae Bălcescu	Misterele Bucureștilor at IMDb
Mitrea Cocor	Mitrea Cocor	1952	1945	Collectivization in Romania		Mitrea Cocor at IMDb
Mînia	Mînia	1978	1907	1907 Romanian peasants' revolt		Mînia at IMDb
Dreptatea - Momentul adevarului	Momentul adevărului	1989	1918	story just before the Great Union		Dreptatea - Momentul adevarului at IMDb
Mușchetarul român	Mușchetarul român	1975	1710		Dimitrie Cantemir	The Romanian Musqueteer at IMDb
The Soimaresti Clan	Neamul Șoimăreștilor	1965	1612-1616	Battle of Cornul lui Sas	Ștefan IX Tomșa, Elisabeta Movilă, Khan Temir	The Soimaresti Clan at IMDb
The Immortals	Nemuritorii	1974	1611		Michael the Brave (mentioned)	The Immortals at IMDb
The Last Assault	Noi, cei din linia întâi	1986	1944-1945	Romania during World War II		Noi, cei din linia întâi at IMDb
Odessa in Flames	Odessa în flăcări	1942	1941	Siege of Odessa		Odessa in fiamme at IMDb
No trespassing	Pe aici nu se trece	1975	1944	Battle of Păuliș		Pe aici nu se trece at IMDb
For Motherland	Pentru patrie	1978	1877–1878	Romanian War of Independence	Carol I, Alexander II of Russia, Osman Pasha, Peneş Curcanul, Mihail Kogălniceanu, C. A. Rosetti, Ion C. Brătianu	For Motherland at IMDb
Pintea	Pintea	1976	1694-1703		Pintea the Brave	Pintea at IMDb
Portrait of the Fighter as a Young Man	Portretul luptătorului la tinerețe	2010	1950s		Ion Gavrilă Ogoranu	Portrait of the Fighter as a Young Man at IMDb
Too Little for Such a Big War	Prea mic pentru un război atît de mare	1970	1944			Too Little for Such a Big War at IMDb
Through the Ashes of the Empire	Prin cenușa imperiului	1976	1917			Prin cenușa imperiului at IMDb
The Kidnapping of the Maidens	Răpirea fecioarelor	1968	1801		Constantine Hangerli, Pazvanoglu	The Kidnapping of the Maidens at IMDb
Răscoala	Răscoala	1966	1907	1907 Romanian peasants' revolt		Rascoala at IMDb
Răzbunarea haiducilor	Răzbunarea haiducilor	1968	1801		Pazvanoglu	Răzbunarea haiducilor at IMDb
The Rest is Silence	Restul e tăcere	2008	1911-1917	inspired by the history of making the movie Independența României	Carol I of Romania, Aristizza Romanescu, Sarah Bernhardt, Grigore Brezeanu, Iancu Brezeanu	The Rest is Silence at IMDb
The Stake and the Flame	Rug și flacără	1980	1802	Assassination of Barbu Catargiu	Alexandru Ioan Cuza, Barbu Catargiu	The Stake and the Flame at IMDb
Captain Ion's Arrow	Săgeata căpitanului Ion	1972	1460		Vlad III the Impaler	Captain Ion's Arrow at IMDb
Săptămâna nebunilor	Săptămâna nebunilor	1971	1818		Anghel Șaptecai, Ioan Gheorghe Caragea, Domnița Ralu Caragea	Săptămâna nebunilor at IMDb
Stejar, extremă urgență	Stejar, extremă urgență	1974	1944	1944 Romanian coup d'état		Stejar, extremă urgență at IMDb
Stephen the Great - Vaslui 1475	Ștefan cel Mare - Vaslui 1475	1975	1475	Battle of Vaslui	Stephen III of Moldavia, Sultan Mehmet II, Maria of Mangop	Stephen the Great - Vaslui 1475 at IMDb
Stefan Luchian	Ștefan Luchian	1981	1890-1916	life of painter Ștefan Luchian	Ștefan Luchian, Tudor Arghezi, George Enescu, Nicolae Tonitza	Stefan Luchian at IMDb
Totul se plătește	Totul se plătește	1987	1847		Gheorghe Bibescu, Constantin Alexandru Rosetti, Neofit al II-lea, Cezar Bolliac, Marițica Ghica	Totul se plătește at IMDb
Trandafirul galben	Trandafirul galben	1982	1845		Marițica Bibescu, Constantin Alexandru Rosetti	Trandafirul galben at IMDb
The Death Triangle	Triunghiul morții	1998	1916-1917	Battle of Mărăști, Battle of Mărășești, Third Battle of Oituz	Ecaterina Teodoroiu, Ferdinand I of Romania, Marie of Romania, Alexandru Averescu, Henri Mathias Berthelot, Wilhelm II, Eremia Grigorescu, Ion I. C. Brătianu	The Death Triangle at IMDb
Tudor	Tudor	1962	1821		Tudor Vladimirescu, Alexander Ypsilantis	Tudor at IMDb
Death's last frontier	Ultima frontieră a morții	1979	1944	The Massacre of Moisei, Maramureș		Ultima frontieră a morții at IMDb
Last Night of Love	Ultima noapte de dragoste	1980	1916			Last Night of Love at IMDb
A Clod of Clay	Un bulgăre de humă	1989	1849-1889		Ion Creangă, Mihail Eminescu, Veronica Micle	A Clod of Clay at IMDb
Somewhere in the East	Undeva, în Est	1991	1945-1960	Collectivization in Romania		Somewhere in the East at IMDb
Vis de ianuarie	Vis de ianuarie	1979	1846		Mihail Sturdza, Franz Liszt, Alecu Russo, Barbu Lăutaru, Gheorghe Asachi, Moș Ion Roată	Vis de ianuarie at IMDb
Vlad Țepeș	Vlad Țepeș	1979	1428–1476	Night attack at Târgoviște	Vlad III the Impaler, Mehmed II, Pope Pius II	Vlad Tepes at IMDb
Zestrea domniței Ralu	Zestrea domniței Ralu	1971	1817		Anghel Șaptecai, Ioan Gheorghe Caragea, Domnița Ralu Caragea	Zestrea domniței Ralu at IMDb
Ziua Z	Ziua Z	1985	1944	1944 Romanian coup d'état		Ziua Z at IMDb

== See also ==
- List of historical drama films
- List of war films and TV specials
- List of films set in ancient Rome
- List of costume drama films
- List of Romanian films
- List of Romanian submissions for the Academy Award for Best Foreign Language Film
- List of Romanian film and theatre directors
- Cinema of Romania
- Period piece
- Epic film
- Biographical film
