= The Silver Mask =

1985 film

- Directed by: Gheorghe Vitanidis
- Written by: Eugen Barbu; Nicolae Paul Mihail
- Produced by: Gheorghe Pîrîu; Mihai Opriș
- Starring: Florin Piersic; Marga Barbu; Szabolcs Cseh
- Cinematography: Ion Anton
- Edited by: Magda Chișe-Ghincioiu
- Production company: Casa de Filme 5
- Release date: 25 May 1985
- Running time: 108 minutes
- Country: Romania
- Language: Romanian

The Silver Mask (Romanian: Masca de argint) is a 1985 Romanian action historical film directed by Gheorghe Vitanidis. This is the fourth film in the Margelatu series, after Drumul oaselor (1980), Trandafirul galben (1982), Misterele Bucureștilor (1983), followed by Colierul de turcoaze (1986) and Totul se plătește (1987).

== Cast ==
- Florin Piersic — Mărgelatu
- Marga Barbu — Agatha Slătineanu
- Alexandru Repan — Serge Troianoff
- Szabolcs Cseh — Buză de Iepure (as Sobi Ceh)
- Ion Besoiu — domnitorul Gheorghe Bibescu
- Ovidiu Iuliu Moldovan — Aristide / „Masca de argint”
- Traian Stănescu — aga Villara
- George Motoi — lt. Deivos
- Jean Constantin — „profesorul” Aurică
- Marin Moraru — boierul Teodosie Vâlcu
- Vasile Nițulescu — boierul Hargot
- Mihai Mereuță — țăranul Oseacă care aduce carul cu fân
- Constantin Codrescu — Ion Heliade-Rădulescu
- Gheorghe Nuțescu — Turkish diplomatic agent Fuad
- Coca Andronescu — Maria, the cook of the boyar Vâlcu
- Olga Delia Mateescu — Aspasia Șuțu, sisther of Agatha
- Anna Széles — gypsy woman
- Constantin Guriță — the conservative boyar Vardala
- Radu Dunăreanu — poet Cezar Bolliac
- Emil Coșeru
- Dumitru Lazăr — vizitiul surdo-mut Casapu
- Mihai Verbițchi
- Boris Petrof — crâșmarul care-l servește pe Mărgelatu
- Mihai Perșa — slujbaș al Agiei
- Mihai Marta
- Val Lefescu
- Monica Roman
- George Alexandru — epilepticul
- Miron Murea
- Ionel Rusu
- George Menelas
- Aurel Popescu

== See also ==
- List of Romanian historical films
- List of feature film series with six entries
