= List of Romanian film and theatre directors =

This is a list of Romanian film and theatre directors. It includes some foreign-born film and theatre directors who have worked or lived in Romania.

== A ==
- Haig Acterian
- Victor Antonescu

== B ==
- Paul Barbăneagră
- Andrei Blaier
- Elisabeta Bostan
- Ion Bostan
- Lucian Bratu

== C ==
- Paul Călinescu
- Virgil Calotescu
- Ion Filotti Cantacuzino
- Nae Caranfil
- Ion Caramitru
- Octav Chelaru
- Liviu Ciulei
- Dinu Cocea
- Ioan Mihai Cochinescu
- Mihai Constantinescu
- Stefan Constantinescu

== D ==
- Mircea Daneliuc
- Iosif Demian
- George Dorobanțu
- Mircea Drăgan

== G ==
- Emil Gârleanu

== I ==
- Marin Iorda

== M ==
- Manole Marcus
- Horaţiu Mălăele
- Iulian Mihu
- Cătălin Mitulescu
- Anghel Mora
- George Motoi
- Vlad Mugur
- Mihai Măniuțiu

== N ==
- Gheorghe Naghi
- Doru Năstase
- Jean Negulesco
- Cristian Nemescu
- Sergiu Nicolaescu

== P ==
- Lucian Pintilie
- Corneliu Porumboiu
- Dan Puric

== R ==
- Dem Rădulescu

== S ==
- Andrei Șerban
- Florin Șerban

== V ==
- Vasile Vasilache
- Mircea Veroiu
- Gheorghe Vitanidis

== Z ==
- Florin Zamfirescu

== See also ==
- Cinema of Romania
