= Traian Stănescu =

Romanian actor (1940–2022)

- Born: 27 March 1940; Făget, Timiș, Romania
- Died: 12 April 2022 (aged 82); Bucharest, Romania

Traian Stănescu (27 March 1940 – 12 April 2022) was a Romanian actor.

== Biography ==
He graduated from the Institute of Theater and Cinematography in Bucharest (IATC) in 1961, the class of Professor G.D. Loghin, after which he was assigned to the State Theater Piatra Neamț (currently the Youth Theater). The period spent here (1961 - 1964) was a significant page in his acting career, a period he remembered with pleasure: he had the opportunity to play in premieres (he plays the role of Vulpașin in "Miss Nastasia”, Tom, in “Glass Menagerie”, directed by Cornel Todea etc.) and had the opportunity to be a member of an artistic collective.

He returned to Bucharest in 1964, first to the Giulești Theater, then to the Small Theater, so that from 1968 he became an actor of the National Theater "I. L. Caragiale”, and since 2002 as an honorary member.

He had played in countless plays throughout his career, including "The Enigma of Otilia", "King Lear", "Richard III", "Who Needs Theater", "Orpheus in Hell", "Swallow", "Bloody Lovers”, “Saturday, Sunday, Monday” etc. He has collaborated on several Radio and TV theater performances; long filmographic activity.

== Personal life and death ==
He was married from 1977 to the actress Ilinca Tomoroveanu until her death and they had a son together, Mihai Stănescu, also an actor. Stănescu died in Bucharest on 12 April 2022, at the age of 82.

== Filmography ==
- Răscoala (1966)
- Trandafirul galben (1982) - aga Mavrodineanu
- The Silver Mask (1985) - aga Villara
- Colierul de turcoaze (1986) - aga Villara
- Oglinda (1994) - Constantin Titel Petrescu, president of Social Democratic Party
- Ochii care nu se văd (1996) - Suru
- Fetele Marinarului (TV Series) (2009) - The priest
- Moștenirea (TV Series) (2010 - 2011) - Ghiță
