= Florin Piersic =

Romanian actor

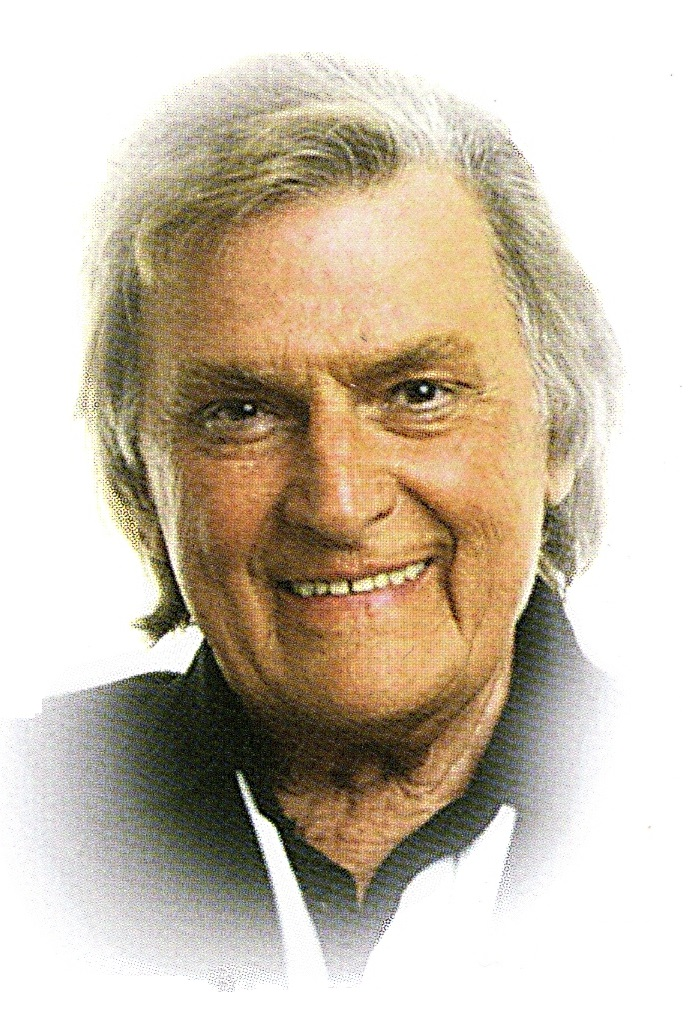
- Born: January 27, 1936 (age 90); Cluj, Kingdom of Romania
- Citizenship: Romania; Moldova
- Education: I. L. Caragiale National University of Theatre and Film
- Occupation: Actor
- Years active: 1957–present
- Employer: National Theatre Bucharest
- Spouses: Tatiana Iekel (m. 1962; div. 1974) Anna Széles (m. 1975; div. 1985) Anna Török (m. 1993)
- Children: 2
- Father: Ștefan Piersic
- Awards: Order of Cultural Merit, 5th class Order of the Star of Romania, Officer class

Florin Piersic (Romanian pronunciation: [floˈrin ˈpjersik]; born 27 January 1936) is a well-known Romanian actor and TV personality. He is particularly noted for his leading roles in The White Moor and the Mărgelatu series films. He has a reputation, often parodied in popular culture, as a raconteur.

In 2006 and 2011 the actor was chosen by Disney Pixar to provide the Romanian voice of Mack in the animated movie Cars.

== Biography ==
He was born in Cluj. Piersic's parents were from Bucovina, his mother was born in Valea Seacă, and his father, Ștefan Piersic, a veterinary physician, was originally from Corlata. Piersic spent his childhood years in Corlata, Pojorâta, and Cajvana, later, in Cernăuți, and then his family moved to Cluj, where Florin graduated from the High School for Boys No. 3.

Piersic attended the Caragiale Academy of Theatrical Arts and Cinematography in Bucharest. He joined the regular cast of the Romanian National Theater in 1959 and performed in numerous productions until his retirement in 1989. His first role was as Richard in the play The Devil's Disciple.

In 1958 he made his debut on screen in the French-Romanian co-production The Thistles of the Bărăgan. He appeared in more than forty movies, most of them in the Ceaușescu era. He often depicted heroic, masculine characters. More recently, he played in a soap opera.

Piersic married three times: to Tatiana Iekel (their marriage lasted from 1962 to 1974), with whom he had a son, Florin Jr.; to Anna Széles (1975–1985), the mother of another son, Daniel; and from 1993, he has been married to Anna Török.

In 1967, he was awarded the Order of Cultural Merit. In 2006, Piersic was voted to the 51st place on the 100 greatest Romanians list. In 2008 he became an honorary citizen of Oradea. In 2009, he was bestowed with the lifetime achievement award in the Transilvania International Film Festival. In 2016, he was awarded the Order of the Star of Romania, Officer class.

== Selected filmography ==
- 1957 – The Thistles of the Bărăgan - Tănase
- 1961 – A Bomb Was Stolen - The Young Gangster
- 1965 – The White Moor - Harap Alb
- 1968 – The Last Roman
- 1968 – The Column - Sabinus
- 1970 – Liberation - Otto Skorzeny
- 1971 – Michael the Brave - Preda Buzescu
- 1975 – Stephen the Great - Vaslui 1475 - Cristea Jder
- 1976 – Pintea Viteazul - Grigore Pintea
- 1977 – Oil! - Dan
- 1980 – Drumul oaselor - Mărgelatu
- 1981 – The Yellow Rose - Mărgelatu
- 1983 – Misterele Bucureștilor - Mărgelatu
- 1985 – The Silver Mask - Mărgelatu
- 1985 – Racolarea - George Tudoran
- 1986 – Colierul de turcoaze - Mărgelatu
- 1987 – Totul se plătește - Mărgelatu
- 2004 – Numai iubirea - Octavian
- 2005 – Eminescu versus Eminem
- 2005 – Lacrimi de iubire - Alexandra's father
- 2006 – Lacrimi de iubire - filmul - Titus Mateescu
- 2009 – State de România - General Teodorescu
- 2014 – O nouă viață - Tase
- 2016 – Străini în noapte
- 2019 – Sacrificiul - Aristide
- 2020 – Sacrificiul: Alegerea - Aristide
