= Lake Ghioroc =

- Location within Romania
- Location: Ghioroc, Romania
- Coordinates: 46.1517°N 21.5774°E
- Type: Artificial lake
- Catchment area: 1.05 km^{2} (0.41 sq mi)
- Basin countries: Romania
- Max. length: 0.97 km (0.60 mi)
- Max. width: 0.65 km (0.40 mi)
- Surface area: 50 ha (120 acres)
- Max. depth: 28 m (92 ft)
- Settlements: Ghioroc, Arad

Ghioroc Lake (Romanian: Lacul Ghioroc) is a man-made lake located in Ghioroc, Arad County, Romania. The lake has a surface area of approximately 50 hectares (120 acres) and is a popular recreational and fishing destination. The lake has several land patches away from the coastline, which are used as vacationing spots or clubbing.

The lake known as the Ghioroc Lake or Balta Ghioroc is the southern pit, immediately adjoining the connecting road from Sâmbăteni to Ghioroc and the Arad to Bucharest mainline. The northern side, formerly just Ghioroc 2 was separated in two smaller sections that are still being preserved as a mining pit for building materials (sand, gravel).

The lake is 22 kilometers (14 mi) away from Arad and 80 kilometers (50 mi) from Timișoara.

== History ==
In the 1960s it was decided to mine in this specific area for gravel and other aggregates, which were highly sought-after especially during the building boom of Communist Romania. This has been the eminent use of the area until the 1980s, when the need for building materials decreased. As most gravel pits are built in river valleys, in this case the Mureș River, they gradually fill with water as the high water level allows for the persistence of a lake.

In the early 1990s, the lake has been opened for tourists, although it has not been officially recognized as a touristic destination. Due to high levels of pollutants from the usage and remaining exploitation, the lake was temporarily shut down and all the remaining waste has had to be cleared out.

In the 2000s, the lake has been officially added as a tourist attraction of Arad County. The lake has been cleaned and an artificial beach has been created with native sand to accommodate the renewed popularity of the lake.

Ghioroc Lake has also been populated with fish of indigenous varieties in order to also become a popular fishing destination.

== Tourism ==
Lake Ghioroc brings a considerable amount of income to the commune of Ghioroc. It is mostly popular for local tourists, and the region has plenty visit during the summer season. It is estimated that hundreds of tourists visit it, on an average summer day. A small commercial area exists adjacent to the beach providing dining, shopping and camping and parking facilities.

Due to the increased popularity of the lake as a tourist hotspot, free unrestricted access to the shores of the lake is gradually being reduced by sales of land with the corresponding lake access and continuing usage of the surrounding areas as farm land and manufacturing.

=== Fishing ===
The lake is allegedly populated with several species of fish: Prussian carp, Eurasian carp, Wels catfish, rudd, roach and bream making the lake popular among fishermen, being especially accessible and fishing is allowed.

=== Water sports ===
Lake Ghioroc can also be used for practicing water sports. Windsurfing and diving are popular, due to the strong winds and favorable dimensions of the lake.

== Depth controversy ==
The maximum depth of Lake Ghioroc is controversial. It is a local legend that says that no one has ever reached the bottom of the lake.
