= The Yellow Rose (film) =

1983 film

- Romanian: Trandafirul galben
- Directed by: Doru Năstase
- Starring: George Motoi; Ion Dichiseanu
- Release date: 23 December 1983
- Running time: 102 minutes
- Country: Romania
- Language: Romanian

The Yellow Rose (Romanian: Trandafirul galben) is a 1983 Romanian action film directed by Doru Năstase. This is the second film in the Margelatu series, after Drumul oaselor (1980), followed by Misterele Bucureștilor (1983), Masca de argint (1985), Colierul de turcoaze (1986) and Totul se plătește (1987).

== Cast ==
- George Motoi - Lt. Delvos
- Ion Dichiseanu - Cpt. Margarit
- Ioana Pavelescu - Maritica Ghica
- Traian Stanescu - Aga Villara
- Marga Barbu - Agata Slatineanu
- Dinu Ianculescu - Tala'at
- Papil Panduru -
- Vistrian Roman - Lt. Corlatescu
- Szabolcs Cseh - Buza de Iepure
- Florin Piersic - Margelatu
- Mihai Mereuta - Oseaca
- Constantin Barbulescu -
- Constantin Codrescu - Rosetti
- Mihai Verbițchi
