= The Waves of the Danube =

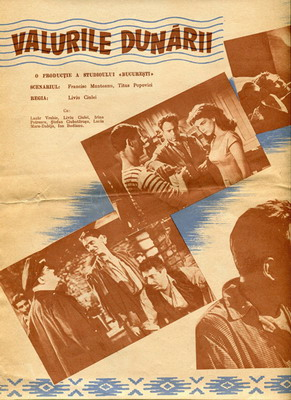
- Directed by: Liviu Ciulei
- Screenplay by: Francisc Munteanu; Titus Popovici
- Produced by: Gheorghe Teban; Dumitru Carabăț
- Starring: Lazăr Vrabie; Liviu Ciulei; Irina Petrescu; Ștefan Ciubotărașu; Costel Constantinescu; Mircea Septilici
- Cinematography: Grigore Ionescu
- Edited by: Rada Israil
- Music by: Theodor Grigoriu
- Production company: Buftea Studios
- Distributed by: Româniafilm
- Release date: 23 May 1960
- Running time: 100 minutes
- Country: Romania
- Language: Romanian

The Waves of the Danube (Romanian: Valurile Dunării) is a 1960 Romanian film directed by Liviu Ciulei and based on a screenplay by Francisc Munteanu and Titus Popovici.

== Cast ==
- Lazăr Vrabie — lt. Valentin Toma, the undercover officer taken as a sailor on the barge NFR 724
- Liviu Ciulei — Mihai Strejan, the helmsman of barge NFR 724
- Mircea Septilici — the German officer who orders the dispatch of a barge
- Irina Petrescu — Ana Strejan, the young wife of the helmsman
- Ștefan Ciubotărașu — policeman, head of the Preventive Detention
- Costel Constantinescu — rail worker, clandestine communist, Toma's liaison

== Reception ==
The film was watched by 4,953,112 spectators in cinemas in Romania, as evidenced by a situation of the number of spectators recorded by Romanian films from the date of the premiere until December 31, 2014, compiled by the National Cinematography Center.
