= Cuvin =

Cuvin may refer to:

- Cuvin, the Romanian name of Kovin, a town in Serbia
- Cuvin, a village in Ghioroc commune, Arad County, Romania
