= The Reenactment =

The Reenactment Reconstituirea
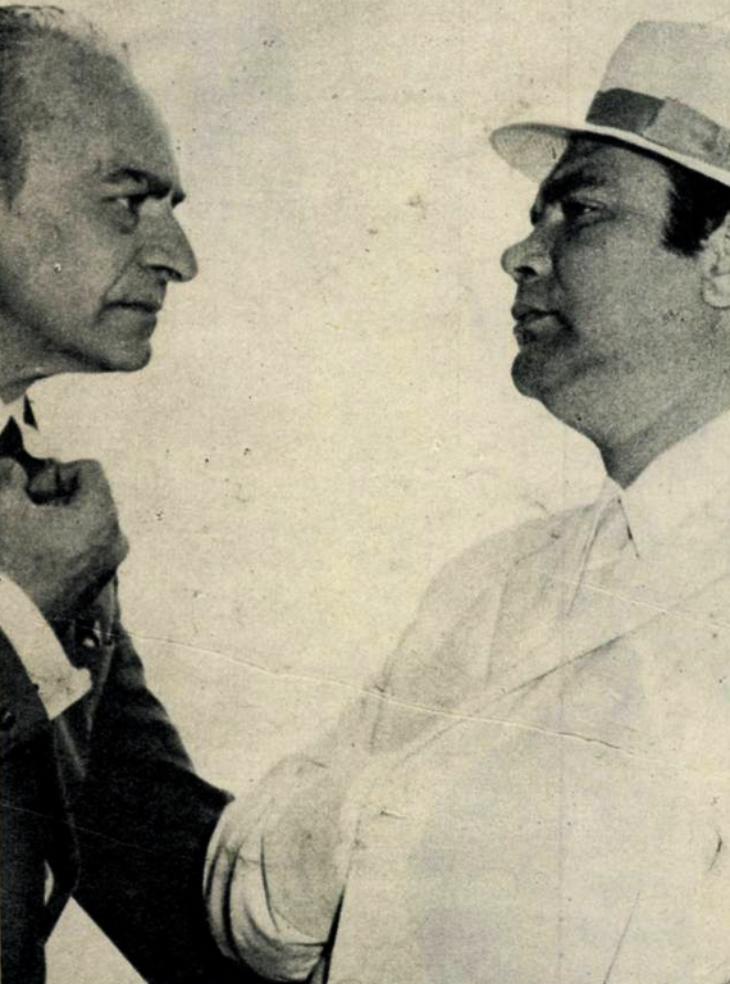
- Romanian actors Emil Botta (left) and George Constantin filming on Lucian Pintilie's Reenactment.
- Directed by: Lucian Pintilie
- Written by: Horia Pătrașcu; Lucian Pintilie
- Produced by: Lucian Pintilie
- Starring: George Constantin; George Mihăiță; Vladimir Găitan
- Cinematography: Sergiu Huzum
- Edited by: Eugenia Naghi
- Distributed by: Filmstudio București
- Release date: 1968
- Running time: 100 minutes
- Country: Romania
- Language: Romanian

The Reenactment (Romanian: Reconstituirea), also known as Reconstruction, is a 1968 black-and-white film by Romanian director Lucian Pintilie. It is based on a novel by Horia Pătrașcu, reflecting real-life events witnessed by the author. Produced under the communist regime, which it indirectly criticizes, the film is a tragicomedy about incompetence, indifference and misuse of power. Structured as a film within a film and largely shot as a mockumentary, The Reenactment stars George Constantin as a prosecutor who keeps in custody two minor delinquents, Vuică and Nicu, played respectively by George Mihăiță and Vladimir Găitan. He makes them reenact their drunken brawl at a restaurant, and is helped in this effort by the militiaman Dumitrescu (played by Ernest Maftei) and a film crew. Two bystanders watch upon the youngsters' degradation at the hands of the prosecutor. They are The Miss (Domnișoara in the original), played by Ileana Popovici, who is amused by the succession of events, and the pedantic alcoholic Paveliu (Emil Botta).

The recipient of much critical acclaim and considered in retrospect one of the most notable contributions to Romanian cinema, The Reenactment was released at a time when the communist regime was in its liberalization phase, coinciding with the first decade of rule by Nicolae Ceaușescu. Nevertheless, its political implications irritated communist officials, and the censorship apparatus decided to withdraw the film from cinemas only months after its premiere. In 1969, Pintilie was pressured to work outside Romania, and focused mainly on stage production for the following twenty years of his career. The Reenactment was again screened at home in 1990, one year after the Romanian Revolution toppled communism.

== Production and plot ==
Both Horia Pătraşcu's novel and the screenplay (co-authored by Pătraşcu and Pintilie) are closely based on real-life events. The incident was witnessed by Pătraşcu during the early 1960s, and took place in his native town of Caransebeş, shortly before a celebration of August 23 (Communist Romania's national holiday, commemorating the 1944 coup). The militiamen involved had detained two youths with no prior criminal record, accusing them of having been drunk and disorderly, and had decided to make them reenact the scene in order to educate the public about the perils of alcohol. In a 1999 interview, Pătrașcu acknowledges that, as a university student and part-time activist at a local culture house, he was a member of the original crew.

Like in the film, the militiamen's decision seems to have outweighed the punishment proscribed for such offences: they made the youths film the same scene over and over, and, in the process, exposed them to public humiliation. Pătrașcu, who credits German writer Erich Maria Remarque and his All Quiet on the Western Front with having inspired his narrative, states: "At the actual, filmed reenactment I for one had a terrible shock. They were children, they were just children. The police made them do what they had previously done. But that was a beach, a pool, there were girlies wearing bathing suits, some of them were connected with those girlies, and the [militiamen] were making them do what they had done when they were drunk, which was absurd, which made me shiver." In both story and film, Vuică dies after his friend, pressured by the authorities into making the reenactment look more authentic, hits him over the head with a stone.

There was a significant gap between the story's publishing and the start of production. Filmmaker Mircea Săucan recalls repeatedly urging Pătraşcu to turn his text into a screenplay. Before Pintilie took up the project, Horia Pătrașcu says, he was approached by two other directors. The first was Radu Gabrea, who abandoned it once he decided to resettle in West Germany; the second was Liviu Ciulei, who disagreed with the writer over the plot's tragic outcome, and eventually ended talks. Also according to Pătraşcu, Pintilie was enthusiastic about making the film, and anxiously approached the author just as he was taking his final exams. George Mihăiţă, Vladimir Găitan and Ileana Popovici were debuting actors in their early twenties. As Mihăiţă recalls, he and Găitan were cast after a brief interview with Pintilie. Poet and actor Emil Botta was fifty-seven at the time, while George Constantin was thirty-five and Ernest Maftei forty-eight. Despite the marked age difference, Mihăiță remembers, that the communication on the set was smooth and the atmosphere playful.

The film was shot on location in the Southern Carpathian resort of Sinaia, but preserves some elements from the intended setting, including the restaurant's name Pescăruș ("Seagull"), which had been borrowed from its Caransebeș model.

== Themes ==
In addition to its factual content, The Reenactment stands as a metaphor for the people's inability to control their own destinies under the grip of a totalitarian regime, and, through its cultural implications, is also seen as a retrospective condemnation of Socialist realism and its didacticism (see Socialist realism in Romania). To a certain degree, Pintilie's film also criticizes the indifference with which such persecution is received by the public. A recurring motif in the film is the background noise of crowds rooting for their squad during a soccer match, in what the director explains is a satirical allusion to the Greek choir's role in cheering the performers, in this case transfigured by "human dumbness". In 2004, Lucian Pintilie wrote that his decision to shoot the film was also motivated by his disgust in respect to the invasive practices of communist authorities, having previously been informed that one of his friends, a closeted gay actor, was denounced for breaking Romania's sodomy law, and, in order to avoid the prison sentence, was forced to have intercourse with his wife while investigators watched.

Pintilie also stated his objection to the very notion of an inquiry, noting that such a procedure "is the most effective way of veiling reality", and indicated that the film was in part an allusion to the tradition of torture and repeated interrogation, enforced by the Securitate secret police in the previous decade. George Constantin's character was thus supposed to be a Securitate officer, but, Pintilie claims, the institution was scandalized by the possibility of an exploration into its past, and appealed to Nicolae Ceaușescu personally to prevent this from happening; as a consequence, Pintilie turned the protagonist into a prosecutor. Although the reference to Miliția practices was the result of such pressures, it became one of the most valued attributes of the film. The portrayal of militiamen as brutal and irresponsible contrasted with their sympathetic portrayal in films approved of by the Ceauşescu regime, and especially with the post-1970 series Brigada Diverse. In a 2007 article for Gândul, journalist Cristian Tudor Popescu writes that, by exposing the torment which could be caused even by routine Militia interventions, The Reenactment "had discarded the urban legend of 'militiamen so stupid that they make one laugh with tears when seeing how stupid they are'."

"Harshness" was identified by Mircea Săucan as a main characteristic of the film. Stressing that he does not find this trait to be a defect, he states that, had he directed the film, he would have insisted more on the "cold" aspect of the inquiry, to stand in contrast with the melodrama-like aspect of some scenes. Commenting on such traits, Cristian Tudor Popescu wrote: "37 years ago, a prosecutor and two militiamen were organizing, on the terrace of an isolated pub, the reenactment of a brawl between two guys. Under the eye of Lucian Pintilie, the tremendous actor George Constantin, together with George Mihăiţă, Vladimir Găitan and Ernest Maftei, were reconstructing [...], starting from a beer mug crashing into a head, the whole monstrous skeleton of the kitschy evil on which Romanian communist authorities were relying."

In 1965, Pintilie had directed the film Duminică la ora şase, which dealt in part with similar themes, but, as the director indicates, only hinted in that direction. It was showcased and acclaimed at the Pesaro Film Festival in Italy. He recalls: "The film's prologue clearly placed the plot in the years of [Romanian] socialism. [...] Who are the youths from the film's prologue? I was asked directly by the audience [...] Aren't today's youths these youths in the film? No, I shamelessly lied, for there was clearly a possibility for prevarication, no, I said in order to be able to return to Romania and make The Reenactment." George Mihăiță recounts not realizing at first the importance of his role: "The best proof of [our] sublime unawareness was that, when shooting was over, I asked Pintilie—joking more or less—when he was going to give me a more important part to play... He smiled and said just this: 'Wait and see the movie!' "

== Impact and legacy ==
=== Censorship ===
The Reenactment's release coincided with the peak of liberalization policies in Romania, and with a moment when Ceauşescu appeared to be pursuing an independent path within the Eastern Bloc. However, the film caused consternation among communist officials. Pătraşcu recalls that the film was only shown sporadically as the censorship apparatus was deciding its fate: it premiered at the Luceafărul Cinema in Bucharest, where "the projectionist was driven out of his mind" because it ran as the main feature for two months on end. Mihăiţă recalls: "the film's presentation was stripped of all ceremony. Better put, the film was introduced through 'the back door' at Luceafărul... It stood there, without any comments, for about a month, before being withdrawn as discreetly as it had appeared." The Reenactment was also shown in Timișoara, but, Pătrașcu indicates, no program or promotional material given approval for publishing; it was only shown with discretion in several other main cities, "until people had heard about it", then withdrawn. The writer also remembers being "glad" upon learning that the film managed to raise public awareness, and that it incited viewers to engage in rioting against Miliția forces.

Early in 1969, the authorities took the decision to withdraw the film from cinemas, a ban which lasted until the regime came to an end two decades later. According to George Mihăiță: "It's worth knowing that, upon viewing, some comrade [that is, communist official]—it no longer matters what his name was!—said 'this film ought to be stored in a room and someone should swallow the key'...!" It was as a result of the scandal that communist officials began investigating Romanian cinema in general, and intervened to stop filming on Pragul albastru, which was based on a screenplay by Ion Dezideriu Sîrbu, a former political prisoner who was undergoing rehabilitation. Pintilie's Securitate file, made available for the public in the 2000s (decade), contains lengthy and minute reports on the film, and documents the negative reaction of official critics (quoted saying that the film is "mediocre" or "mean"), but also the appreciation from the part of more rebellious intellectuals. For instance, it describes how, moments after having seen the film in Bucharest, the avant-garde author and former communist Geo Bogza scribbled in the snow set on the director's car the words: "Long live Pintilie! The humble Geo Bogza."

In May 1970, the Cannes Film Festival offered to show The Reenactment during its Une Quinzaine des Réalisateurs event. As Pintilie notes, the invitation was intercepted by the Securitate and never reached him. In a fragment of his 1970 diary, published in 2003, he reflected his frustration over this issue, comparing the censorship apparatus with the bureaucrats sarcastically depicted in the works of 19th century writer Nikolai Gogol: "the Gogolian clerks have decided to strike me out of Romanian cinema for good. For as long as I am alive, they have not won their bet." The same year however, he was able to return to the Pesaro Film Festival, where he was celebrated with a retrospective and a special trophy. Pintilie confesses that the ceremony failed to impress him at the time, due to his feelings of dissatisfaction and his determination to continue filming in Romania. Such events were also organized in other cities, among them London and Bologna, but Pintilie refused to attend them.

Another clash between Pintilie and the communist system occurred in 1972, when he satirized officials by staging a subversive version of Gogol's The Government Inspector, which was suspended soon after its premiere. In an interview with The New York Times, he records a meeting he had with the censors: "I was told, 'If you want to continue working here, you have to change your conception of the world.' I answered, 'But I've just started formulating it. [...] All I can do is develop it.' "

During the following period, Pintilie only worked sporadically in Romania and was pressured to seek employment abroad (notably, in the United States, where he served as artistic director for Minneapolis' Guthrie Theater and Washington, D.C.'s Arena Stage). His only other film released at home before 1989, the 1981 De ce trag clopotele, Mitică?, was loosely based on stories by Ion Luca Caragiale. Noted for subtly criticizing the Ceaușescu regime at a time when it had returned to a hard-line stance (see July Theses), it was itself censored by the officials. Film critic Doinel Tronaru argues that both productions are equally accomplished. Pătrașcu, dissatisfied by the new restrictive guidelines, avoided contributing screenplays, and instead focused on cultural activities with Adrian Păunescu's Cenaclul Flacăra, whose shows still maintained a degree of artistic independence.

=== Recovery ===
Pintilie made his comeback in Romania only after the Romanian Revolution of 1989, and served as head of the Ministry of Culture's Cinema Creation Studio. He resumed film directing and producing, with titles such as Balanţa, An Unforgettable Summer, Lumière and Company, and the 1996 Too Late (nominated for Palme d'Or at the Cannes Festival, the same year). Many of them revisit Romania's communist past, and, in his later production După-amiaza unui torționar, he focuses on a more obvious treatment of the Securitate and its repression tactics.

After being again made available for public viewing, The Reenactment again was the subject of critical interest. It was recovered together with similarly censored films by Radu Gabrea (Beyond the Sands) and Dan Piţa (The Contest). It was likened to Mircea Săucan's 1973 production 100 de lei, and, alongside Pintilie's other films, is credited with having inspired the post-Revolution "Romanian New Wave". Cristian Tudor Popescu also argued that the invasive techniques which stand at the center of the film have a continued presence in post-1989 Romanian society. He proposes that they are similar to a sensationalist trend in Romanian television, which sees stations competing for ratings by closely following cases of suicide and murder.

At the Berlin International Film Festival 2002 edition, it was shown as part of a retrospective on 1960s cinema, alongside films such as Lindsay Anderson's if...., John Schlesinger's Billy Liar, Sergio Corbucci's The Great Silence and Jean-Pierre Mocky's Solo. In 2007, Romanian-born historian Irina Livezeanu and the Romanian Cultural Institute organized the festival Romanian Cinema on the Edge. The Reenactment was the only pre-1989 film to be aired alongside works by "New Wave" directors: Corneliu Porumboiu (12:08 East of Bucharest), Radu Muntean (The Paper Will Be Blue), Cristian Mungiu (Occident), Cristi Puiu (Stuff and Dough) and Cristian Nemescu (California Dreamin'). In January 2008, the copy kept by the Romanian National Gallery was presented at the Palm Springs Festival's Archival Treasures Program, being introduced by Chicago Public Radio's Milos Stehlik. Alongside other major Romanian productions, it was shown as part of two Romanian film festivals in Canada: at Montreal (May 2007) and Toronto (February 2008).
