= Black Sea Adventures =

- Directed by: Savel Stiopul
- Screenplay by: Tudor Popescu
- Produced by: Mihai Năstase (adm. producător); Dumitru Carabăț (prod. delegat); Mihai Opriș (redactor)
- Starring: Florin Piersic; Corina Chiriac; Mircea Șeptilici; Dana Crișan
- Cinematography: Ion Anton
- Edited by: Iulia Vincenz Gabrea
- Music by: H. Maiorovici
- Production company: Studioul Cinematografic București
- Distributed by: Româniafilm
- Release date: 1972
- Running time: 135 minutes

Black Sea Adventures (Aventuri la Marea Neagra) is a 1972 Romanian James Bond inspired adventure film directed by Savel Stiopul. The main roles are played by Florin Piersic, Corina Chiriac and Mircea Septilici.

Currently 14th most watched Romanian movie all time box office.

== Plot ==
The story is set along the Romanian seaside and follows a group of young people on a summer vacation at the Black Sea. Their holiday takes an unexpected turn when they become involved in a treasure hunt after stumbling upon a mysterious map.

The plot unfolds as the group embarks on various adventures, facing challenges, danger, and unexpected allies along the way. The film combines elements of comedy, suspense, and action, with the picturesque backdrop of the Romanian coast enhancing the sense of adventure.

The movie is a blend of youthful curiosity, friendship, and excitement, capturing the carefree spirit of the time while offering a glimpse into Romania's coastal beauty. It is a fun, light-hearted film that resonates with themes of camaraderie and discovery.

== Cast ==
- Florin Piersic — George Martin / "Herbert G. Stronghton", counterintelligence captain, purported reporter for Ohio's Irving Star
- Corina Chiriac — the spy Ana Barbara / "Prospero", the singer from the bar of the Hotel Babylon in Stâncile Albe, friend of Hindermann
- Mircea Şeptilici — Richard Demster, owner of a consortium of Anglo-French fashion houses, avid aviator

== Reception ==
The film was seen by 6,769,780 spectators in cinemas in Romania, as evidenced by a situation of the number of spectators recorded by Romanian films from the date of the premiere until December 31, 2014, compiled by the National Cinematography Center.
