= Capu Câmpului =

- Commune
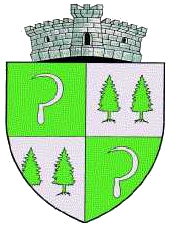
- Coat of arms

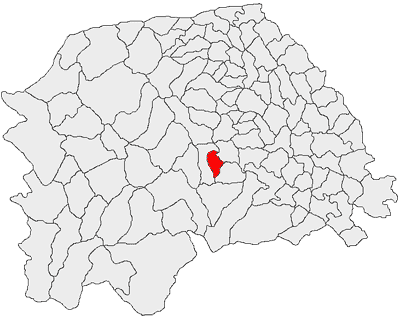
- Location in Suceava County

- Location in Romania
- Coordinates: 47°30′N 26°0′E
- Country: Romania
- County: Suceava

Government
  - Mayor (2024–2028): Marcela Elena Bîrsan (PNL)
- Area: 54 km^{2} (21 sq mi)
- Elevation: 450 m (1,480 ft)
- Population (2021-12-01): 2,276
  - Density: 42/km^{2} (110/sq mi)
- Time zone: EET/EEST (UTC+2/+3)
- Postal code: 727585
- Area code: +(40) 230
- Vehicle reg.: SV
- Website: www.comunacapucampului.ro

Capu Câmpului (German: Kapukimpolui) is a commune located in Suceava County, Bukovina, northeastern Romania. It is composed of a single village, more specifically Capu Câmpului, part of Valea Moldovei commune from 1968 to 2003, when it was split off.

== Administration and local politics ==
=== Communal council ===
The commune's current local council has the following political composition, according to the results of the 2020 Romanian local elections:

Party	Seats	Current Council
National Liberal Party (PNL)	10	
Social Democratic Party (PSD)	1	
