= Teen Knight =

- Directed by: Phil Comeau
- Written by: Antony Anderson; Christopher Mollo (uncredited)
- Produced by: Cris Andrei
- Starring: Kris Lemche; Caterina Scorsone; Benjamin Plener; Paul Soles; Kimberly Pullis
- Cinematography: Gabriel Kosuth
- Edited by: Mark Sanders
- Music by: Trevor Morris
- Production companies: Canarom Productions; The Kushner-Locke Company; Castel Film Romania
- Distributed by: Full Moon Entertainment; Pulsepounders
- Release date: January 19, 1999
- Running time: 90 minutes
- Countries: Canada; Romania
- Language: English

Teen Knight (later released on DVD under the title: Medieval Park) is a 1999 Canadian-Romanian fantasy action adventure family film directed by Phil Comeau and starring Kris Lemche, Caterina Scorsone, Benjamin Plener, Paul Soles and Kimberly Pullis. The film was released on VHS on January 19, 1999 in North America by Pulsepounders. In 2012, it was released on DVD for the first time by Echo Bridge Home Entertainment and again in 2013 under a different title Medieval Park released by Moonbeam Films.

== Plot ==
17-year-old teenage medieval fan Peter wins a contest for a "Medieval Adventure" from a soft drink company. The winners, plus a film crew from the soda company arrive at the castle for the adventure. During the night, a spell cast over 600 years prior brings the castle and all the people in it back to 1383. The evil Lord Raykin plans on retrying to take the castle. It is up to the group to stop him, and thereby return to the 20th century. They enlist the help of the former court magician, Percival, to help them.

== Cast ==
- Kris Lemche: Peter
- Caterina Scorsone: Alison
- Benjamin Plener: Ben
- Paul Soles: Mr. Percy/Percival
- Kimberly Pullis: Claudia
- Marc Robinson: Lord Raykin
- Claudiu Trandafir: Eriuk
- Dan Fintescu: Tommy
- Eugen Cristea: Wiggins
- Mihai Gruia Sandu: Phil
- Mihai Verbintschi: Dungeon Master
- Christian Nicolae: Gary
- Juliana Ciugulea: Mom
- Marius Galea: Hugo
- Ioana Anghel: Mrs. Sweeny
- Steven Bunker: Jimmy
- Dan Franculescu: Kyle
- Dimitrii Bogomaz: Knight
- Liva Constantin: Natalie
- Mircea Caraman: Soldier
