= A Woman for a Season =

1969 film

- Film poster
- Directed by: Gheorghe Vitanidis
- Written by: Nicolae Breban
- Starring: Ioana Bulcă; Iurie Darie; Virgil Ogășanu; Irina Petrescu
- Cinematography: Aurel Kostrachievici
- Release date: July 1969
- Running time: 105 minutes
- Country: Romania
- Language: Romanian

A Woman for a Season (Romanian: Răutăciosul adolescent) is a 1969 Romanian comedy film directed by Gheorghe Vitanidis. It was entered into the 6th Moscow International Film Festival where Irina Petrescu won the award for Best Actress. The film was selected as the Romanian entry for the Best Foreign Language Film at the 42nd Academy Awards, but was not accepted as a nominee.

== Cast ==
- Ioana Bulcă as Dr. Maia Dobrin
- Iurie Darie as Dr. Filip Palaloga
- Virgil Ogășanu as Dr. Laurențiu Nicola
- Irina Petrescu as Ana Patriciu
- Horea Popescu as pharmacist
- Zizi Șerban as woman in pharmacy
- George Aurelian as Șuta
- Ion Anghel as Săbăduș

== See also ==
- List of submissions to the 42nd Academy Awards for Best Foreign Language Film
- List of Romanian submissions for the Academy Award for Best Foreign Language Film
