= Olga Bucătaru =

Romanian actress (1942–2020)

Olga Bucătaru (March 27, 1942, Suceava – April 10, 2020, Bucharest) was a Romanian film and stage actress.

She graduated in 1965 from the Caragiale National University of Theatre and Film. In 2002 she was awarded the National Order of Faithful Service, knight class. She died on April 10, 2020, from a heart attack.

== Filmography (partial list) ==
- Bariera (1972) – Lucica
- Cursa (1975)
- Serenadă pentru etajul XII (1976) – Silvia
- The Mace with Three Seals (1977) – Lady Stanca
- Ecaterina Teodoroiu (1978) – Dr. Lucreția
- Dumbrava minunată (1980) – Spring
- Oglinda (1993) – Queen Mother Helen
- Train of Life (1998) – Femme Wagon
- Iubire și onoare (2010) – Veta
- Când mama nu-i acasă (2017) – Profira
- Fructul oprit (2018) – Katia's mother
