= Doru Năstase =

Romanian film director and actor

- Born: 2 February 1933; Bucharest, Romania
- Died: 29 April 1983; Bucharest
- Occupation: Film director
- Years active: 1971–1983

Doru Năstase (Romanian pronunciation: [ˈdoru nəsˈtase]; 2 February 1933 – 29 April 1983) was a Romanian film director and actor. He was best known for his historical films, such No Trespassing and Vlad the Impaler.

== Filmography ==
=== As director ===
- 1975: No Trespassing (Pe aici nu se trece)
- 1977: Războiul independenței
- 1979: Vlad Țepeș
- 1982: Drumul oaselor
- 1983: The Mysteries of Bucharest (Misterele Bucureștilor)
- 1984: The Yellow Rose (Trandafirul galben)

=== As Assistant Director ===
- 1968/69: The Last Roman
- 1971: Decolarea
- 1971: Michael the Brave

=== Actor ===
- 1972: Black Sea Adventures
- 1979: Mihail, câine de circ
