= Oglinda =

Oglinda - Începutul adevărului
- Directed by: Sergiu Nicolaescu
- Written by: Ioan Grigorescu; Sergiu Nicolaescu
- Release date: 1993
- Running time: 160 min.
- Country: Romania
- Language: Romanian

Oglinda ("The Mirror"), also known as Începutul adevărului ("The Beginning of Truth"), is a controversial 1993 film by Romanian director Sergiu Nicolaescu. It depicts Romania during World War II, focusing on the Royal Coup of 23 August 1944 that toppled Ion Antonescu, the Axis-allied Conducător and authoritarian Prime Minister.

== Cast ==
- Ion Siminie as Ion Antonescu
- Adrian Vîlcu as Michael I of Romania
- Gheorghe Dinică as Mihai Antonescu
- Ștefan Radof as Iuliu Maniu
- George Constantin as Andrey Vyshinsky
- Sergiu Nicolaescu as Johannes Frießner
- Jürgen Lederer as Adolf Hitler
- Peter Wolf Joachim as Joachim von Ribbentrop
- Șerban Ionescu as Lucrețiu Pătrășcanu
- George Alexandru as Ioan Mocsony-Stârcea
- Mircea Rusu as Mircea Ionnițiu
- Ștefan Iordache as Eugen Cristescu
- Dorel Vișan as Petru Groza
- Mitică Popescu as Dumitru Săracu
- Emil Hossu as Colonel Emilian Ionescu
- Ion Lupu as General Constantin Sănătescu
- Vladimir Găitan as Dinu Brătianu
- Viorel Comănici as Alexandru Voitinovici
- Iurie Darie as Iorgu Ghica
- Traian Costea as SS-Standartenführer Wilhelm Röder
- Cornel Ciupercescu as Gheorghe Brătianu
- Vasile Cosma as Marshal Fyodor Tolbukhin
- Monica Ghiuță as Maria Antonescu
- Olga Bucătaru as Queen Mother Helen
- Vasile Boghiță as Baron Manfred von Killinger
- Liviu Crăciun as General Aurel Aldea
- Traian Stănescu as Constantin Titel Petrescu
- Petru Moraru as Teohari Georgescu
- Virgil Andriescu as Gheorghe Gheorghiu-Dej
- Cătălin Păduraru as Corneliu Coposu
- Paul Ioachim
- Ion Chelaru as Gheorghe Pintilie
- Constantin Drăgănescu as Intelligence Service agent
- Virgil Popovici — General Constantin Z. Vasiliu

== Reactions ==
The film was criticized as being apologetic of Antonescu, whom it portrays as a martyr figure, without mention being made of his complicity in the Holocaust (see Holocaust in Romania). Oglinda is also sympathetic to Antonescu's Nazi German ally Adolf Hitler, who is depicted as a calm and wise politician. Nicolaescu himself claims that journalist Octavian Paler labeled it a "fascist film".

The film was also criticized for several other errors. Historian and former public servant Neagu Djuvara, who in 1944 represented Antonescu's government to Stockholm, where he contacted the Soviet Union representative Alexandra Kollontai and unsuccessfully negotiated an armistice, rejected the film's allusive take on these events, which claimed that Romania's special requests had been ignored by their counterparts, and called it "a lie". According to Sergiu Nicolaescu, former King of Romania Michael I, the main decision factor behind Antonescu's deposition, objected to his character being depicted as a heavy smoker. Speaking in 2008, Djuvara criticized Oglinda in its entirety for mystification, while expressing similar reserves in respect to Nicolaescu's 2008 project, a biographical film on Michael's ancestor, Carol I of Romania (Carol I).

Nicolaescu's 1993 production received negative assessments from several film critics. As part of his commentary on Nicolaescu's entire filmography, beginning with films he produced under the communist regime, Valerian Sava depicted Nicolaescu as an untalented director caught in a "megalomaniac trance", and deemed Oglinda "a rudimentary historical reenactment". A similar overview was provided by Angelo Mitchievici, who described "the honor of a dueler", a cliché which he believed was characteristic of Oglinda as well as its predecessors Mihai Viteazul and Nemuritorii.

Nicolaescu defended his film, claiming that its critics were "afraid to look in the face of history." He referred to Oglinda as "real history, without any form of restriction", and "the first and only Romanian political film." He also maintained that Corneliu Coposu, a first-hand witness to the events, applauded the film upon its premiere.
