= Cladova (Mureș) =

Cladova Kalodva-patak
- Location within Romania

Location
- Country: Romania
- Counties: Arad County
- Villages: Cladova

Physical characteristics
- Mouth: Mureș
  - coordinates: 46.1022°N 21.6389°E
- Length: 16 km (9.9 mi)
- Basin size: 71 km^{2} (27 sq mi)

Basin features
- Progression: Mureș→ Tisza→ Danube→ Black Sea
- Tributaries
  - left: Cladovița

The Cladova (Hungarian: Kladova-patak or Kalodva-patak) is a right tributary of the river Mureș in Romania. It discharges into the Mureș near Radna. Its length is 16 km (9.9 mi) and its basin size is 71 km^{2} (27 sq mi).
