= Mircea Șeptilici =

Romanian-Canadian actor

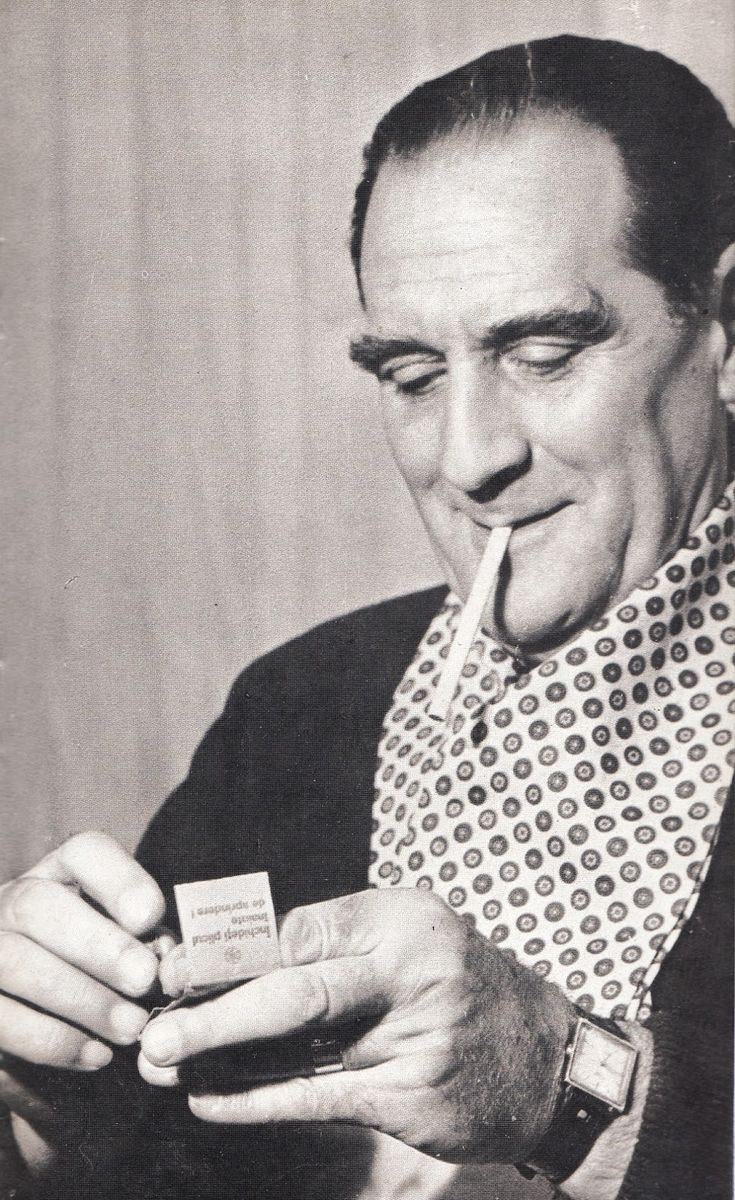
- Born: Mircea Șeptilici; 2 August 1912; Bucharest, Kingdom of Romania
- Died: 7 October 1989 (aged 77); Montreal, Canada
- Citizenship: Canada; France
- Occupation: Actor
- Relatives: Daniel Septilici (grandchild)
- Awards: Order of Cultural Merit

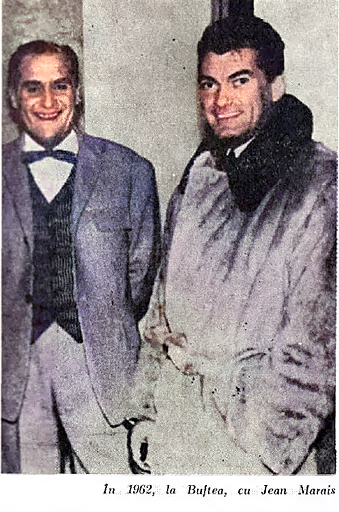
Septilici with Jean Marais, 1962.

Mircea Septilici (2 August 1912 – 7 October 1989) was a Romanian actor. Septilici gained critical acclaim for his roles in films such as Telegrams (1960), The Waves of the Danube (1960), Soldiers of Freedom (1977), James Bond-inspired Black Sea Adventures (1972), and other important Romanian cinematic works.

His performance in Telegrams earned a Palme D'or nomination at the 1960 Cannes Film Festival, along iconic films such as La Dolce Vita (1960) by Federico Fellini and L'Avventura (1960) by Michelangelo Antonioni marking a key moment for Romanian cinema.

Acting was a success from beginning with Star Without a Name. Then on stages of Canada, and after a while in United States, Israel. Gained international acclaim for his role in Troilus and Cressida, which won the Théâtre des Nations Prize in Paris (1966) and toured major European cities including Prague, Berlin, Belgrade, Venice (Teatro La Fenice), and Vienna.

== Biography ==
Mircea Septilici was born on 2 August 1912, in the city of Bucharest.

He graduated in 1937 from the Academy of Theater Arts in Bucharest. Between the years 1948–1956 he was arrested, being accused of anti-communist activity, as a member of the "Tămădău" group. He was awarded the Cultural Merit Order IV class (1967) "for special merits in the field of dramatic art".

== Early career ==
Septilici began his theatre acting journey with a debut in Mihail Sebastian's acclaimed play "Star Without a Name", which established him as an actor in Romanian theatre.

== International career ==
Septilici's international film debut came with his role in the 1960 Romanian film "Telegrame" (Telegrams), which was showcased at the Cannes Film Festival that same year. The film, directed by Aurel Miheleș and Gheorghe Naghi, was a satirical comedy that received a nomination at Cannes.

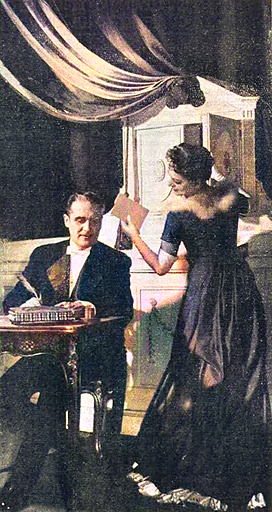
Septilici, 1959.

Between 1966 and 1968, Mircea Septilici played a leading role as Agamemnon in the acclaimed Romanian stage production of Troilus and Cressida, which became one of the most significant international theatre tours of its time. The production was first presented in Paris at the Théâtre des Nations, held at the Sarah Bernhardt Hall, from 4 to 10 October 1966. There, it received the Théâtre des Nations Prize for the best national participation, as well as the award offered by the Union of Theatre and Music Critics for the best performance presented during the festival. The tour continued in Prague, Czechoslovakia, at the Grand Theatre from 14 to 23 October 1966, followed by performances in the German Democratic Republic, first in Berlin and Weimar at the Grand Theatre on 27 and 28 October 1966, and shortly after in Bonn at the Theater der Stadt Bonn. On 18 and 19 September 1967, the play was staged in Yugoslavia, in Belgrade at the Atelje 212 BITEF2 Hall. On 8 October 1967, in Italy at Teatro La Fenice in Venice, as part of the XXVI International Festival of Prose Theatre. The final stop in the tour was in Vienna, Austria, at Theater an der Wien, between 9 and 12 June 1968. The production was a major milestone in Septilici’s stage career and was widely praised by international critics for its artistic vision and the exceptional performances of its cast, with Septilici’s interpretation standing out as one of the strongest elements of the ensemble.

== Filmography ==
- Telegrame (1960) - Cannes 1960
- The Waves of the Danube (film) (1960)
- Porto-Franco (1961)
- Cerul n-are gratii (1962)
- Celebrul 702 (1962)
- La patru pași de infinit (1964) - medicul chirurg Alex. Coman
- Calea Victoriei sau cheia visurilor (1966)
- Secția corecțională (1970) - television film
- Cireșarii (1972) - television series
- Black Sea Adventures (1972)
- Agentul straniu (1974)
- Premiera (1976)
- Avocatul (1976) - television film
- Marele singuratic (1977)
- Regăsire (1977)
- Soldiers of Freedom (1977)
- Jucătorii de cărți (1977) - television film
- Bal în Poiana Zimbrilor (1979)
- Ultima noapte de dragoste (1980)
- Banchetul (1980) - television film
- Vodevilul (1980) - television film
- Șantaj (1981)
- Detașamentul "Concordia" (1981) - the Romanian language teacher

== Legacy ==
There is a Strada Mircea Șeptilici in Suceava, Romania (47.65448°N 26.25247°E) and an Intrarea Mircea Șeptilici (44.49832°N 26.09591°E) in Bucharest, Romania.
