= Battle of Păuliș =

World War II battle

- Part of Battle of Romania, World War II
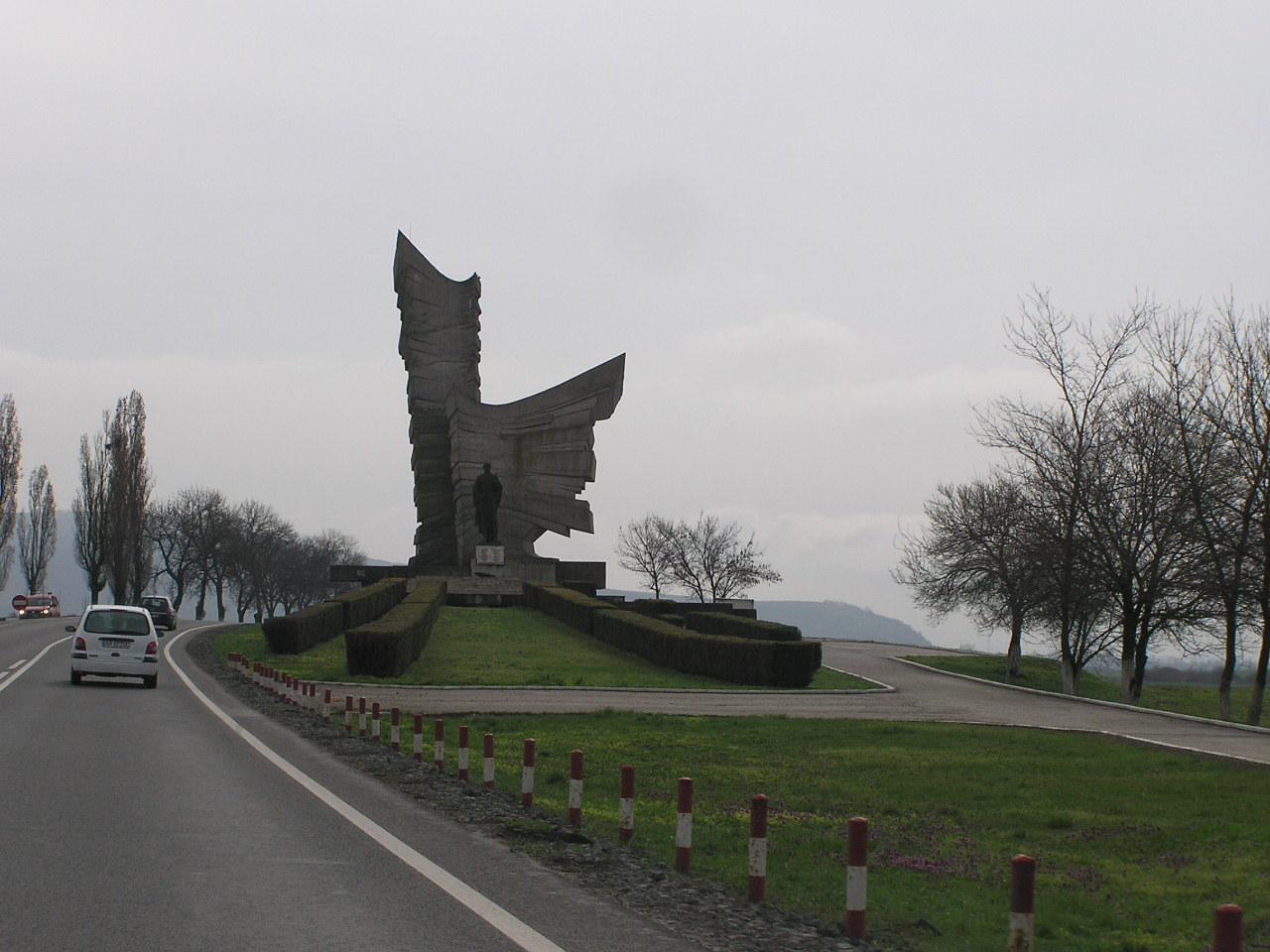
- Heroes Monument in Păuliș
Date	14–21 September 1944
Location	Păuliș, Arad County, Romania
Result	Romanian–Soviet victory

Belligerents
Romania; Soviet Union	Hungary

Commanders and leaders
Alexandru Petrescu	(Kingdom of Hungary (1920–1946)) József Heszlényi

Units involved
"Păuliș" Detachment: 3 NCO School battalions; 1st Battalion, 96th Infantry; 1 artillery battalion; Soviet reinforcements	1st Armored Division; 6th Reserve Infantry Division

Strength
1,800 men Soviet armored units	≈20,000

Casualties and losses
377 men	1,287 men, 23 tanks(Romanian estimates)

The Battle of Păuliș took place in September 1944 in Arad County, western Romania as part of the wider Battle of Romania of World War II. It was fought between Hungarian and Romanian troops, after King Michael's Coup put Romania on the side of the Allies. The Romanians fought off persistent and heavy Hungarian attacks for 4 days. With the arrival of Soviet reinforcements they counter-attacked and pushed the Hungarians back to their original positions.

== Background ==
Advancing on the northern bank of the Mureș River in the direction Sâmbăteni–Miniș, concomitantly with an enveloping maneuver of the right flank of the Romanian troops, the Hungarian 1st Armored and 6th Reserve Infantry Divisions made contact with the "Păuliș" Detachment west of the village of Păuliș (Ópálos) on 14 September. The "Păuliș" Detachment included three battalions of cadets from the Reserve Infantry NCOs School of Radna, present-day Lipova (Lippa), Romania.

== Initial clashes ==
The first assault by the Hungarian troops, carried out with two infantry battalions supported by tanks, was repulsed by the 2nd and 6th Companies of cadets. Five more attacks were subsequently carried out against the Romanian defenders, but by nightfall the Romanian units were firmly holding their positions. The Hungarians lost 18 tanks and 3 armored vehicles, all destroyed by the 4 anti-tank guns of the "Păuliș" Detachment. The following day the Hungarians concentrated their attack on the 1st Battalion of the 96th Infantry Regiment, at Hill 471. After a strong artillery preparation the Hungarians forced the Romanian troops to fall back on successive lines of defense, being stopped in the Cladova Valley only after they seized the villages of Cuvin and Ghioroc. On the morning of 16 September, a surprise Romanian counterattack, without artillery preparation and carried out by the 5th Company of cadets, managed to destroy a large part of the Hungarian force which had broken through the defense perimeter the previous day.

== Climax ==
The climax of battle was reached on 17 September, when the Hungarian command committed all available forces in the attack. After a 45-minute artillery preparation, the Hungarians managed to breach the Romanian lines south-east of Miniș, where they clashed with the 3rd Company of cadets at Hill 365. The attempt to overrun the Romanian unit failed.

On the 19 September, reinforced by Soviet units of the 53rd Army which included tanks and mechanised infantry, the entire "Păuliș" Detachment attacked the Hungarian lines, and by the evening had recaptured their initial positions.

== See also ==
- Pe aici nu se trece, 1975 Romanian film that features the Battle of Păuliș
