= Mihai Verbițchi =

Romanian actor

- Born: September 27, 1957 (age 68); Alexandria, Romania
- Occupation: Actor

Mihai Verbițchi (born September 27, 1957) is a Romanian stage and film actor.

He was married to actress Camelia Zorlescu until her death in 2022.

== Filmography ==
Year	Title	Role	Notes
1983	The Yellow Rose		
1983	Misterele Bucureștilor		
1984	Vreau să știu de ce am aripi		
1984	Dreptate în lanțuri		
1985	The Silver Mask		
1989	Secretul armei... secrete!		
1990	Drumeț în calea lupilor		
1999	Dragonworld: The Legend Continues	Kimison #3	credited as Mihai Verbitchi
1999	Retro Puppet Master	First Pursurer	
1999	Teen Knight	Dungeon Master	
2004	Straight into Darkness	Buchler	
2004	Milionari de weekend	Boris	
2005	The Prophecy: Uprising	Allison's Father	
2005	The Prophecy: Forsaken	Allison's Father	
2007	Jacquou le Croquant	Le forgeron	
2013	Fright Night 2: New Blood	Homeless Man	
2017	Octav	Priest	
2024	Nosferatu	Orthodox Priest	

== See also ==
- List of Romanian actors
