= Silvia Sorina Munteanu =

Romanian opera singer

Silvia-Sorina Munteanu (born August 17, 1965) is a Romanian opera singer.

She was born in Ghioroc, Arad County and completed her undergraduate studies at the Faculty of Music of West University of Timișoara in 1995. Munteanu made her debut in 1996 in Georges Bizet's Carmen. She has been a soloist at the Romanian National Opera, Timișoara, at the Romanian National Opera, Cluj-Napoca, and since 2003 at the Romanian National Opera, Bucharest. Aside from her native country, she has performed in Frankfurt, Essen, Sofia, Varna, Prague, Bratislava, and Budapest, as well as at festivals in other European countries, Thailand, and the United States.
