= Moonbeam Films =

- Company type: Motion picture production, distribution company
- Predecessor: Moonbeam Entertainment; Pulsepounders
- Founded: 2012
- Headquarters: Los Angeles, United States
- Key people: Charles Band
- Parent: Full Moon Features

Moonbeam Films is a family-oriented brand sub-brand of Charles Band's Full Moon Features that is the revived successor to the former Moonbeam Entertainment and Pulsepounders. It distributes family-oriented sci-fi and fantasy films from the past originally released by Moonbeam Entertainment onto DVDs, with some carrying alternative release titles. Some films put out by this distributor were originally released by different companies associated with Paramount Pictures from 1990 until 2015.

== List of film releases ==
Some films received alternate titles when re-released onto DVD. To avoid confusion, both titles are listed here.

Year	Original film title	DVD title release(s)	DVD release date
1993- 1995	Prehysteria! series of films	Prehysteria	2018
1993	Remote		
1994	Beanstalk		
1994	Dragonworld		
1994	Pet Shop		
1995	Josh Kirby... Time Warrior series of films		
1995	Leapin’ Leprechauns!		
1995	Magic Island	July 26, 2015	
1996	Magic in the Mirror		
1996	Spellbreaker: Secret of the Leprechauns		
1997	Magic in the Mirror: Fowl Play		July 26, 2015
1997	Mystery Monsters	Goobers!	April 2012
1997	Johnny Mysto: Boy Wizard		2012
1998	The Secret Kingdom	The Tiny Kingdom	2012
1998	Clockmaker	Timekeeper	February 19, 2013
1998	The Shrunken City	Shandar: The Shrunken City	June 2012
1998	Teen Knight	Medieval Park	September 17, 2013
1998	The Werewolf Reborn!		2012
1998	Frankenstein Reborn!		2012
1999	The Excalibur Kid		2012
1999	Dragonworld: The Legend Continues		
1999	Shapeshifter	Shifter	2013
1999	Teenage Space Vampires		
1999	Teen Sorcery		2012
1999	Phantom Town	Spooky Town	May 21, 2013
1999	Search for the Jewel of Polaris: Mysterious Museum	Night at the Magic Museum; The Magic Museum; Mysterious Museum	August 2012
1999	Alien Arsenal	Alien Weapons	
2000	Task Force 2001		2012
