= Drăgoiești =

- Commune
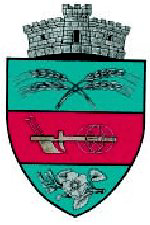
- Coat of arms

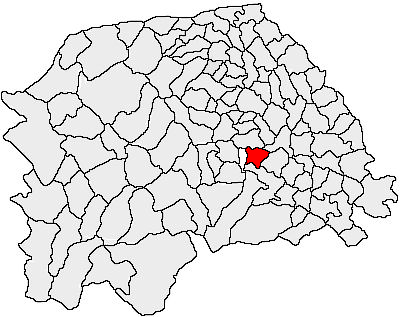
- Location in Suceava County

- Location in Romania
- Coordinates: 47°32′N 26°05′E
- Country: Romania
- County: Suceava
- Subdivisions: Drăgoiești, Măzănăești, Lucăcești

Government
  - Mayor (2024–): Constantin Popescu (PSD)
- Area: 34 km^{2} (13 sq mi)
- Elevation: 385 m (1,263 ft)
- Population (2021-12-01): 2,240
  - Density: 66/km^{2} (170/sq mi)
- Time zone: EET/EEST (UTC+2/+3)
- Postal code: 727215
- Area code: (+40) x30
- Vehicle reg.: SV
- Website: comunadragoiesti.ro

Drăgoiești (German: Dragojestie) is a commune located in Suceava County, Romania.

It is composed of three villages: Drăgoiești, Lucăcești (German: Lukazestie), and Măzănăești (German: Mazanajestie) (the commune center). Two other villages were part of the commune until 2005, when they were split off to form Berchișești commune.
