= Lucian Bratu =

Jewish-Romanian film director

- Born: 14 July 1924; Bucharest, Romania
- Died: 9 May 1998 (aged 73); Bucharest
- Occupations: Film director, producer
- Years active: 1960-1985

Lucian Bratu (14 July 1924 – 9 May 1998) was a Romanian Jewish film director. Bratu directed ten films between 1960 and 1985.

== Filmography ==
- Secretul cifrului (1959)
- Tudor (1962)
- Sărutul (1965)
- Un film cu o fată fermecătoare (1966)
- Drum în penumbră (1972)
- Orașul văzut de sus (1975)
- Mireasa din tren (1979)
- Angela merge mai departe (1981)
- Acordați circumstanțe atenuante? (1984)
- Orele unsprezece (1985)

== See also ==
- List of Romanian film and theatre directors
- List of Romanian films
