= The Thistles of the Baragan =

1958 film

- Romanian: Ciulinii Bărăganului
- Directed by: Louis Daquin; Gheorghe Vitanidis
- Written by: Louis Daquin; Panait Istrati; Alexandru Struțeanu; Antoine Tudal
- Starring: Nuță Chirlea
- Cinematography: André Dumaître
- Release date: 1958
- Running time: 116 minutes
- Country: Romania
- Language: Romanian

Ciulinii Bărăganului (The Thistles of the Bărăgan; French: Les Chardons du Baragan) is a 1958 Franco-Romanian film directed by Louis Daquin and Gheorghe Vitanidis, based on a novel of the same title by Panait Istrati.

The film was nominated for the Golden Palm award at the 1958 Cannes Film Festival.

== Cast ==
- Nuța Chirlea, as Matache
- Ana Vlădescu, as Tudorița
- Ruxandra Ionescu, as Stana
- Florin Piersic, as Tănase
- Nicolae Tomazoglu, as Mărin
- Clody Bertola, as Duduca
- Matei Alexandru
- Marcel Anghelescu, as Ursu
- Maria Tănase
- Mihai Berechet
- Ernest Maftei
- Benedict Dabija
- Constantin Ramadan
