= Berchișești =

- Commune
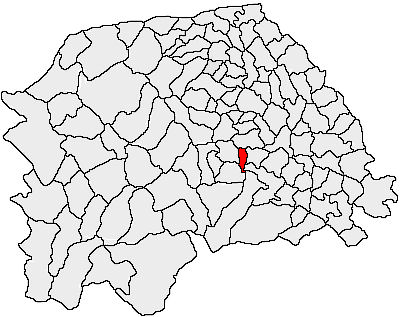
- Location in Suceava County

- Location in Romania
- Coordinates: 47°32′N 26°2′E
- Country: Romania
- County: Suceava
- Subdivisions: Berchișești, Corlata

Government
  - Mayor (2024–2028): Zenovia-Violeta Țaran (PSD)
- Area: 16 km^{2} (6 sq mi)
- Elevation: 474 m (1,555 ft)
- Population (2021-12-01): 3,157
  - Density: 200/km^{2} (510/sq mi)
- Time zone: EET/EEST (UTC+2/+3)
- Postal code: 727216
- Area code: +40 x30
- Vehicle reg.: SV
- Website: comunaberchisesti.ro

Berchișești (German: Berkiszestie or Berkischestie) is a commune located in Suceava County, in the historical region of Bukovina, northeastern Romania. It is composed of two villages, Berchișești and Corlata (German: Korlata). These were part of Drăgoiești commune until 2005, when they were split off to form a separate commune.
