= No Trespassing (1975 film) =

1975 Romanian historic and military film

- Romanian: Pe aici nu se trece
- Directed by: Doru Năstase
- Written by: Titus Popovici
- Produced by: Dumitru Fernoagă; Lidia Popita
- Starring: Silviu Stănculescu; Vlad Rădescu; Ana Széles
- Cinematography: Aurel Kostrachievici
- Edited by: Cristina Ionescu
- Music by: Tiberiu Olah
- Distributed by: RomâniaFilm
- Release date: 1975
- Running time: 152 minutes
- Country: Romania
- Language: Romanian
- Budget: 8.096.000 lei

No Trespassing (Romanian: Pe aici nu se trece, lit. "One does not pass through here") is a 1975 Romanian historical drama directed by Doru Năstase and written by Titus Popovici. It follows the events around the Battle of Păuliș, fought during World War II.

The film is known in English as No Trespassing!, a mistranslation of the title, which actually refers to a popular phrase used in a staunch military defense.

== Plot ==
The film opens just before King Michael's Coup of August 1944, at the Reserve Infantry NCOs School of Radna. Students are regularly harassed and abused by the German officers present, in particularly the SS officer Reinhardt (Motoi). When the coup occurs, the students turn against the Germans and arrest most of them, with Reinhardt fleeing in the night. As the nearby town of Păuliș celebrates, Axis planes bomb the village, prompting many of the villagers to plan to leave. The students receive word that the Hungarians, with German support (including Reinhardt, who alerts them about the weakness of the cadets), are launching an invasion force. The school is given the order to delay the approaching enemy, or die in the attempt. During these events, the film follows the stories of a handful of characters: Andrei (Rădescu), who finds himself in conflict with his peers; Colonel Maxineanu (Stănculescu), the school commander; and Adrian (Mavrodineanu), a young villager who is inspired by the bravery of the cadets.

The Hungarians arrive and launch a series of attacks against the Romanians. The Axis forces are pushed back again and again, despite superior numbers and weaponry. At the end of the film, they launch one last attack, which seems to be a breakthrough. Just at that moment, reinforcements from the Soviet and Romanian armies arrive, pushing the Hungarians back.

== Cast ==
- Silviu Stănculescu as Colonel Maxineanu
- Vlad Rădescu as Andrei
- Ana Széles as Ada
- Vladimir Găitan as Petru
- George Motoi as Reinhardt
- Mihai Mereuță as Sergeant Toma
- Victor Mavrodineanu as Adrian
- Eugenia Bosînceanu as Mama
- Cornel Coman as Lieutenant Ionescu
- Sorin Lepa as Medicul
- Ștefan Velniciuc as Nicolae
- Ovidiu Moldovan as Sică
- Ilarion Ciobanu as Ilarie
- Dinu Ianculescu
- Ferenc Fabian as the Gendearme
- Constantin Dinulescu as the Doctor
- Emil Liptac as Avram
- Jean Lorin Florescu
- Dorin Varga
- Aurora Șotropa
- Mihai Cafrița
- Mircea Cosma as a German officer
- Ladislau Miske as a Hungarian officer
- Karoly Sinka
- Constantin Lungeanu
- Papil Panduru
- Nicolae Pomoje
- Cornel Gîrbea
- Constantin Branea
