= Păuliș =

- Commune
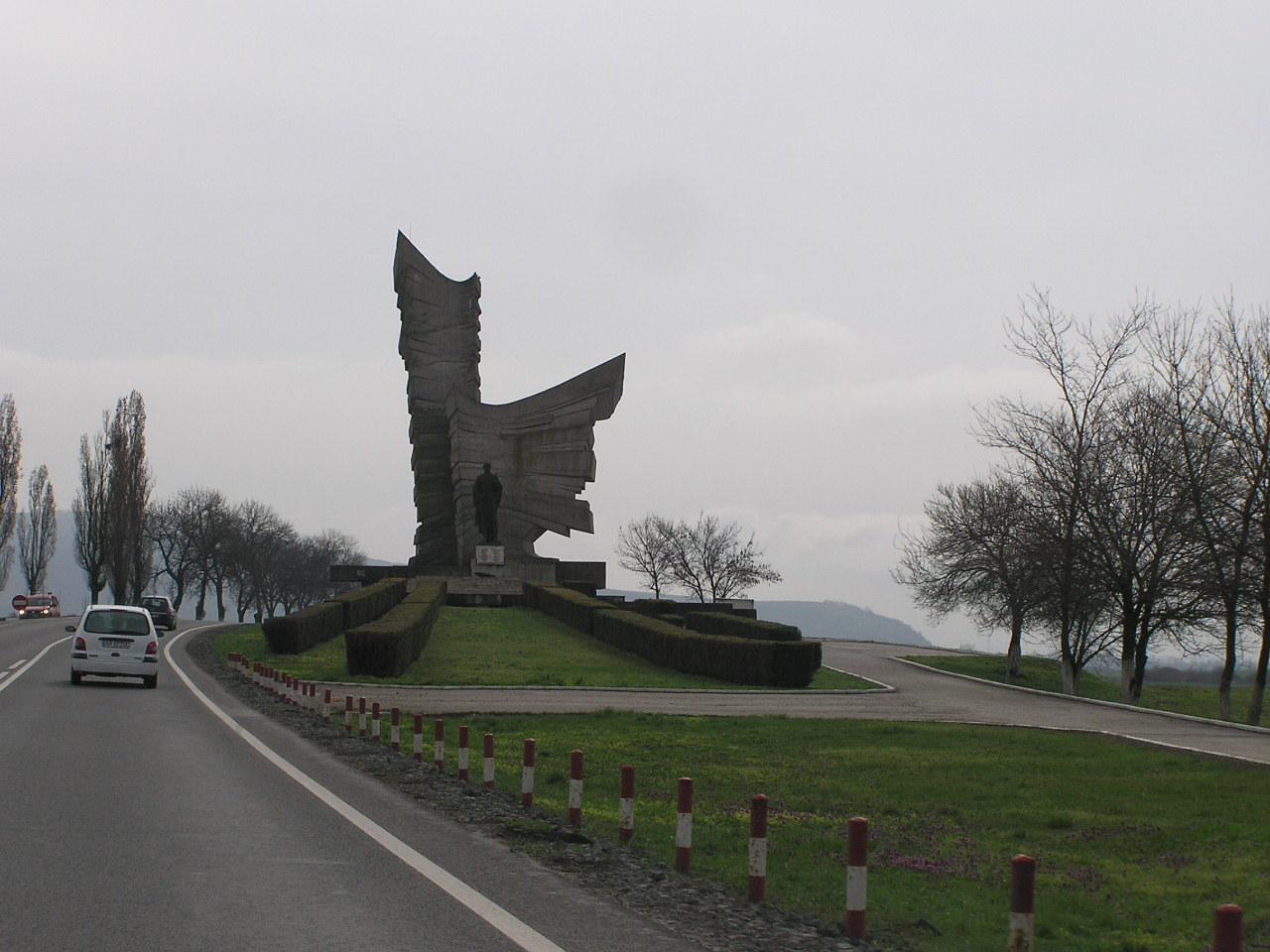
- World War II Heroes Monument in Păuliș

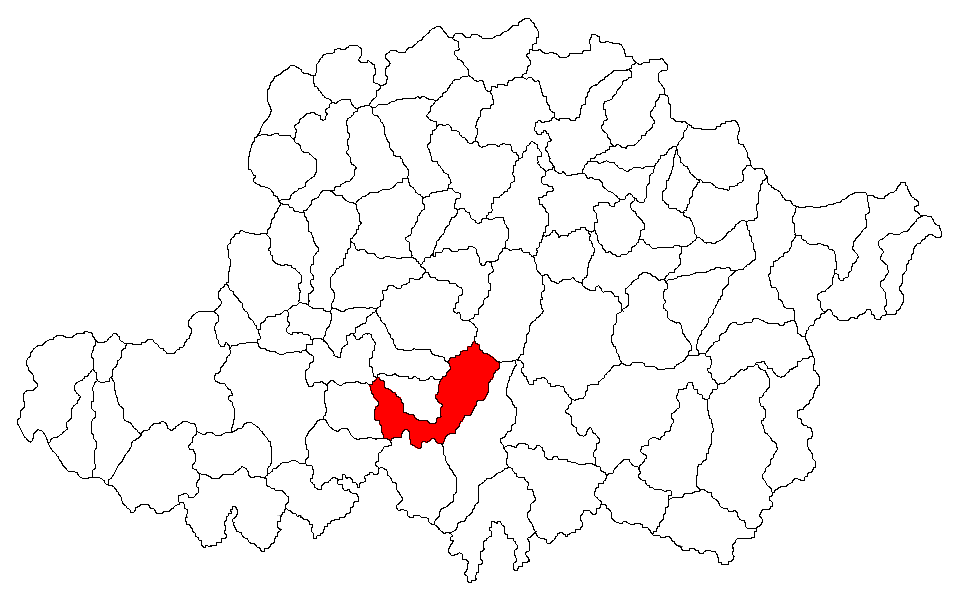
- Location in Arad County

- Location in Romania
- Coordinates: 46°7′N 21°35′E
- Country: Romania
- County: Arad

Government
  - Mayor (2024–2028): Saul Sigheti (AUR)
- Area: 128.06 km^{2} (49.44 sq mi)
- Elevation: 128 m (420 ft)
- Population (2021-12-01): 4,234
  - Density: 33.06/km^{2} (85.63/sq mi)
- Time zone: UTC+02:00 (EET)
  - Summer (DST): UTC+03:00 (EEST)
- Postal code: 317230
- Area code: (+40) 0257
- Vehicle reg.: AR
- Website: paulis.ro

Păuliș (Hungarian: Ópálos) is a commune in Arad County, Romania, It is composed of four villages: Barațca (Pálosbaracka), Cladova (Kalodva), Păuliș, and Sâmbăteni (Szabadhely).

== Geography ==
The commune lies on the banks of the Mureș River and its right tributary, the Cladova. It is situated at an altitude of 128 m (420 ft), in the contact zone of the Mureș Couloir with the Arad Plateau and the Zărand Mountains. The administrative territory of the commune is 12,806 ha (31,640 acres).

The commune centre is located in the south-central part of the county, 24 km (15 mi) east of the county seat, Arad. Păuliș is crossed east to west by the national road DN7 (part of European route E68), which links Bucharest with the Banat region, ending at Nădlac. The Păuliș train station serves the CFR Main Line 200, which runs from Bucharest to Timișoara and Arad, ending at the border crossing point at Curtici.

== Population ==
Historical population
Year	Pop.	±%
1880	4,973	—
1910	6,039	+21.4%
1930	5,059	−16.2%
1977	4,842	−4.3%
2002	4,148	−14.3%
2011	4,120	−0.7%
2021	4,234	+2.8%
Source: Census data

According to the 2011 census, the commune had 4,120 inhabitants, out of which 88.45% were Romanians, 4.44% Roma, 2.48% Hungarians, 0.5% Germans, and 4.1% are of other or undeclared nationalities. At the 2021 census, Păuliș had a population of 4,234; of those, 88.47% were Romanians, 3.24% Roma, 1.61% Hungarians, and 0.35% Germans.

== History ==
The first documentary record of Păuliș dates back to 1333. Barațca was attested documentarily in 1913, Cladova in 1308.

The Battle of Păuliș between Hungarian and Romanian troops occurred here in September 1944, during World War II. The 1975 movie Pe aici nu se trece (No Trespassing) recounts the event.

=== Sâmbăteni ===
Around 1700, a regiment, with probably Serb soldiers, was deployed to defend the Arad region against the Ottoman invasions. These soldiers met once a week in a pub called "la Baba Cati" to give their report on Saturdays (Sâmbăta in Romanian). The place was given the name Sämbäteni, and from here, the names Sembotel, Sobotel. The Serb priests called it Subotel, while the Hungarians, Szabotdhel, or Szabadhely, eventually becoming Sâmbăteni.

Sâmbăteni is the birthplace of statistician, demographer, and physician Sabin Manuilă (1894–1964). It was also the home of notorious hacker Guccifer (born 1971).

== Economy ==
The commune's present-day economy can be characterized by a powerful dynamic force with significant developments in all the sectors present in the commune. In agriculture wine-growing occupies a significant proportion, Barațca village being a well-known viticultural and wine-growing centre. The industry of building materials is represented by the exploitation of granite and diorite in Cladova and Barațca.

== Tourism ==
Among the main sights are the Heroes' Monument in Păuliș put up to the memory of the Romanian soldiers killed in the battles in 1944 while defending the Mureș Couloir, the dendrologic park with rare species of yew-tree, magnolia and Himalayan pine, the reinforced settlement and the church dating from the 14–16th centuries situated on the Carierei Hill in Cladova, as well as the famous blindages in Sâmbăteni dating back to the Dacian-Roman period.

The valleys around Cladova were particularly beautiful, comprising extensive oak forest, but nowadays much of this has been destroyed by local inhabitants carrying out illegal treecutting, and unlicensed companies removing up to 500 tons of logs each day. The machinery used to do this, such as large trucks and tractors, has destroyed most of the original rural roads.
