= Valea Moldovei =

- Commune
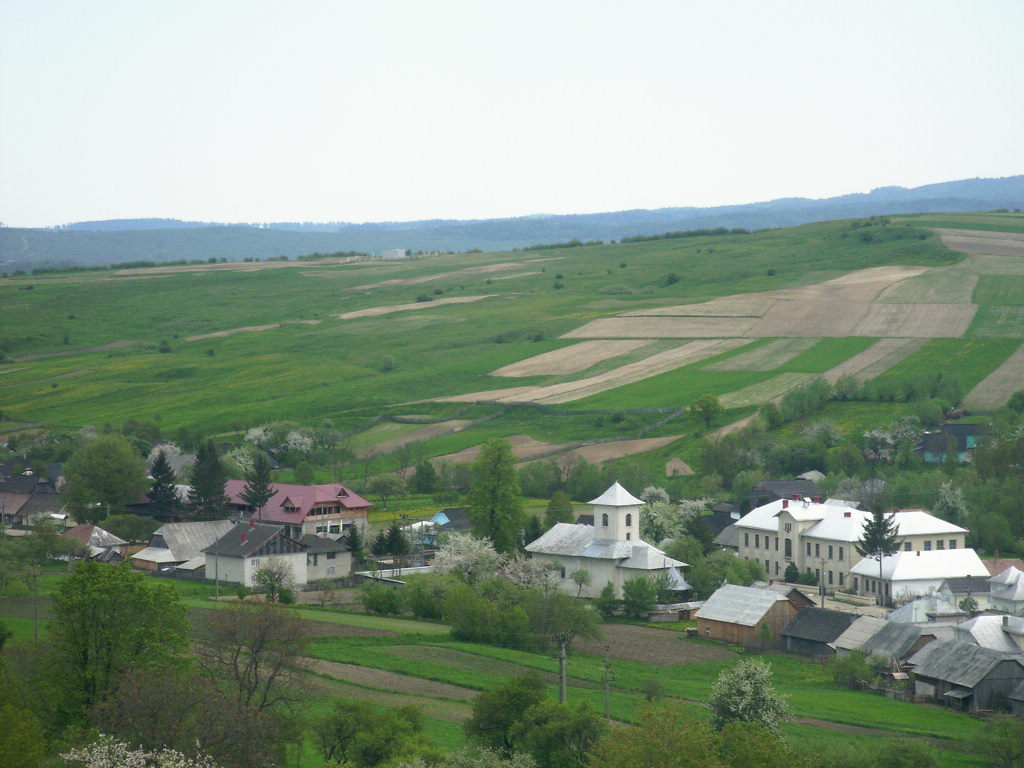
- Rural landscape in Valea Moldovei

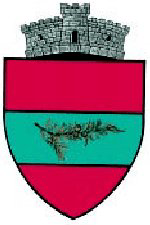
- Coat of arms

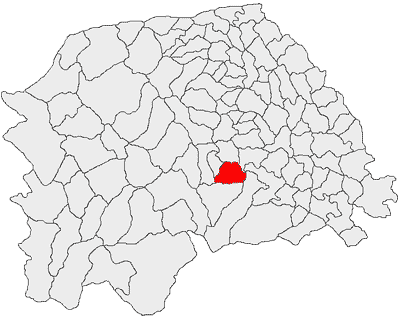
- Location in Suceava County

- Location in Romania
- Coordinates: 47°28′N 26°2′E
- Country: Romania
- County: Suceava
- Subdivisions: Valea Moldovei, Mironu

Government
  - Mayor (2024–2028): Niculai-Romică Floriștean (PSD)
- Area: 23.03 km^{2} (8.89 sq mi)
- Elevation: 450 m (1,480 ft)
- Population (2021-12-01): 4,393
  - Density: 190.8/km^{2} (494.0/sq mi)
- Time zone: UTC+02:00 (EET)
  - Summer (DST): UTC+03:00 (EEST)
- Postal code: 727580
- Area code: (+40) x30
- Vehicle reg.: SV

Valea Moldovei (in the past known as Valea Seacă, German: Walesaka or Wallessaka) is a commune located in Suceava County, Bukovina, northeastern Romania. It is composed of two villages, more specifically Mironu and Valea Moldovei. It also included Capu Câmpului village from 1968 to 2003, when it was split off to form a separate commune.

As of 2021, its population is 4,393. Its area is 23.03 km^{2}.
