= Pintea the Brave =

15th-century Romanian rebel

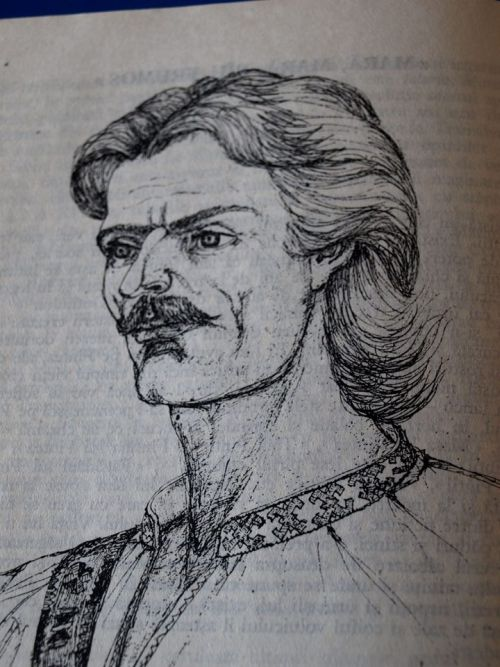

Grigore Pintea, aka Pintea the Brave (Romanian: Pintea Viteazul; Hungarian: Pintye Vitéz; February 25, 1670 in Hollómező, Principality of Transylvania (today Măgoaja, Romania) – August 14, 1703 in Nagybánya, Kingdom of Hungary (today Baia Mare, Romania), was a famous heroic haiduc (rebel) stemming from Măgoaja, Lăpuș Country.

"Have you heard of such brave,
With such a merciful heart,
Of a such great brave,
He is helping the poor”

According to biographical records, Grigore Pintea, son of Cupșa Pintea and Mălina (born Costan), was born in 1670 as a descendant of petty Romanian nobility - as Ioan Cupșa - from Hollómező (now Măgoaja) in Belső-Szolnok Country. According to legends, ballads, and movies, he antagonizes regional nobles and decides to fight against social injustice. He flees to the forests of the nearby Maramureş Máramaros County and lives like a Robin Hood (haiduc). During those years, he terrorized the local nobility, who strove to catch him, but he always managed to evade them.

In 1681, Ioan Cupșa built the Nicula Monastery from Doboka County and donated the famous weeping icon of Mary. On the lands of the same Cupșa family lays the commune Cupșeni in the Máramaros County.

During the reign of emperor Leopold I, taxes levied by Habsburgs in Transilvania led to the Kuruc revolt. In this context, Francis II Rákóczi started a national freedom fight based on serfs and on help promised by the king of France ( Louis XIV) and the czar of Russia (Peter the Great).

Grigore Pintea was made captain in the army of Francis II Rákóczi. Pintea was educated, knowing many foreign languages and military techniques, studied in imperial garrisons. Performing diplomacy as a good negotiator (resulting in the protocols of January 1700 with the leader of the Szatmár (Satu Mare) citadel, count F. Löwenburg, Pintea was declared, "one of the most significant Romanians of the 17th century".

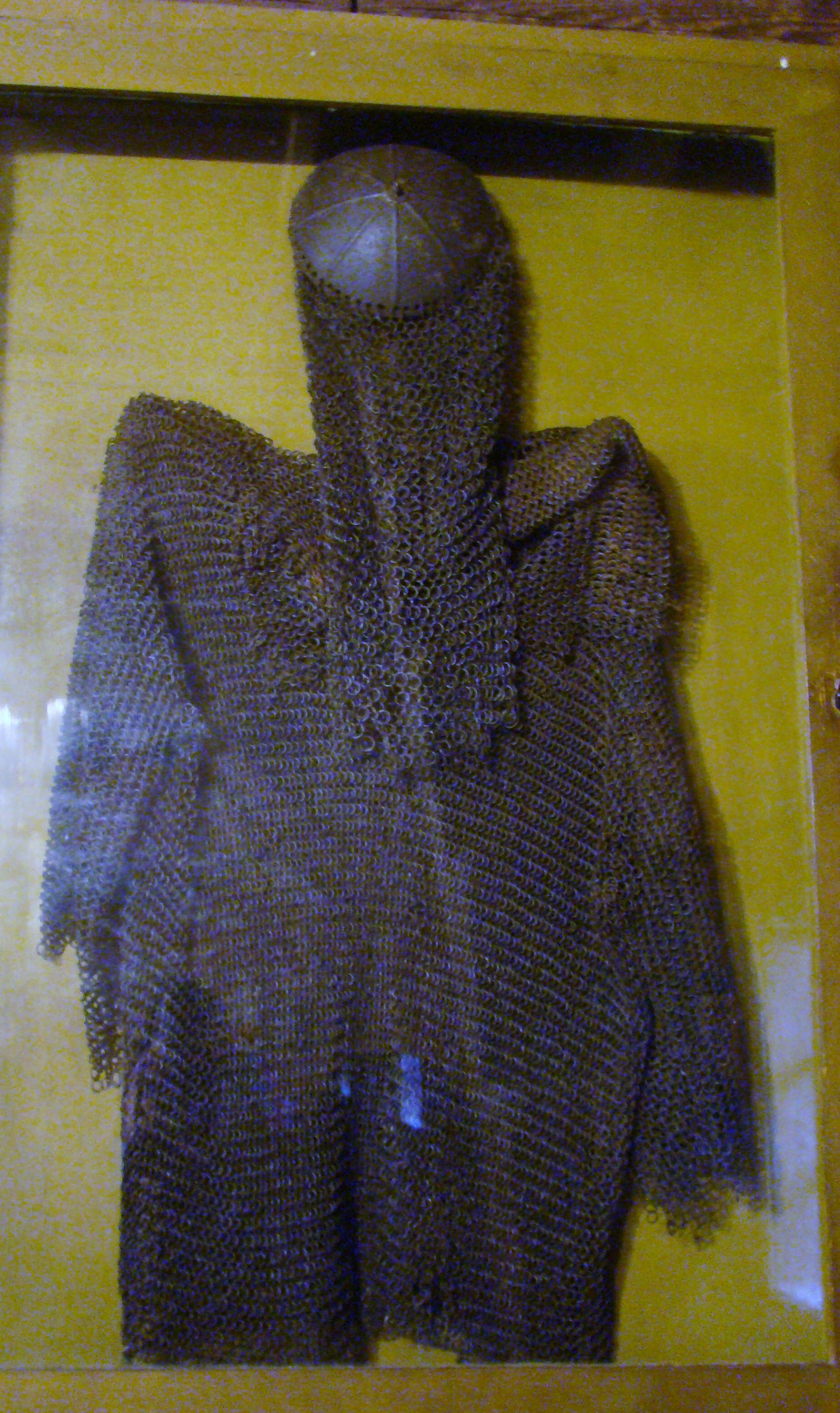
Chain mail shirt owned by Pintea

In spring 1703, several cities in the north of Transylvania – Zilah (Zalău), Szatmár (Satu Mare), Beszterce (Bistrița), Dés (Dej), Máramarossziget (Sighetu Marmației) – are taken by the revolt. Pintea's army had the task to conquer the Nagybánya (Baia Mare) citadel. In August the citadel is under siege. On August 14, in an ambush, Pintea is fatally shot in front of the southern gate of the citadel, close to the Tower of the Slaughterers.

In the church of Budești there is the iron shirt and helmet worn by Pintea in fights against the Tartars and in the Nagybánya (Baia Mare) museum one can see his weapons and horse tools.

Many places in the region have names mentioning Pintea and his band of outcasts: Pinteas's Spring, Pintea's House, Pintea's Fountain, Pintea's Band, Pintea's Peak, and Pintea's cavern. Legends talk about money hidden in various caverns by Pintea.

== Presumed funeral monument ==
In the center of a tight loop of the curvy mountain road descending the Gutin Mountains towards Baia Mare, first turn below the Pintea Viteazul restaurant marking the highest point of the pass, one can see his impressing funeral monument (maybe his cenotaph). On the marble tomb-stone one can read the following: “The legend tells that Pintea the Brave, whose life was cut short by the tricks of the Baia Mare nobility on August 7, 1703, was buried in this place by his soldiers”.

== Movies ==
Pintea the Brave was the subject of the film Pintea (1976), directed by Mircea Moldovan, and starring Florin Piersic in the main role. Considered one of the most-watched Romanian films, Pintea may not be accurate in all historical details, as new information has emerged about the final parts, but it is artistically a huge success. It features many local cultural details and songs. The film was shot in the geographical area of Baia Mare.
