= Brâncuși =

Brâncuși may refer to:

- Constantin Brâncuși (born 1876), Romanian sculptor, painter and photographer
- Grațiela Brâncuși (born 1989), Romanian actress based in the United States
- Constantin Brâncuși University of Târgu Jiu, a public state university located in Târgu Jiu, Romania
- Constantin Brâncuși metro station, a station on line M5 of Bucharest Metro
- Sculptural Ensemble of Constantin Brâncuși at Târgu Jiu
- Brâncuși Day, a public holiday in Romania
