= George Motoi =

Romanian actor

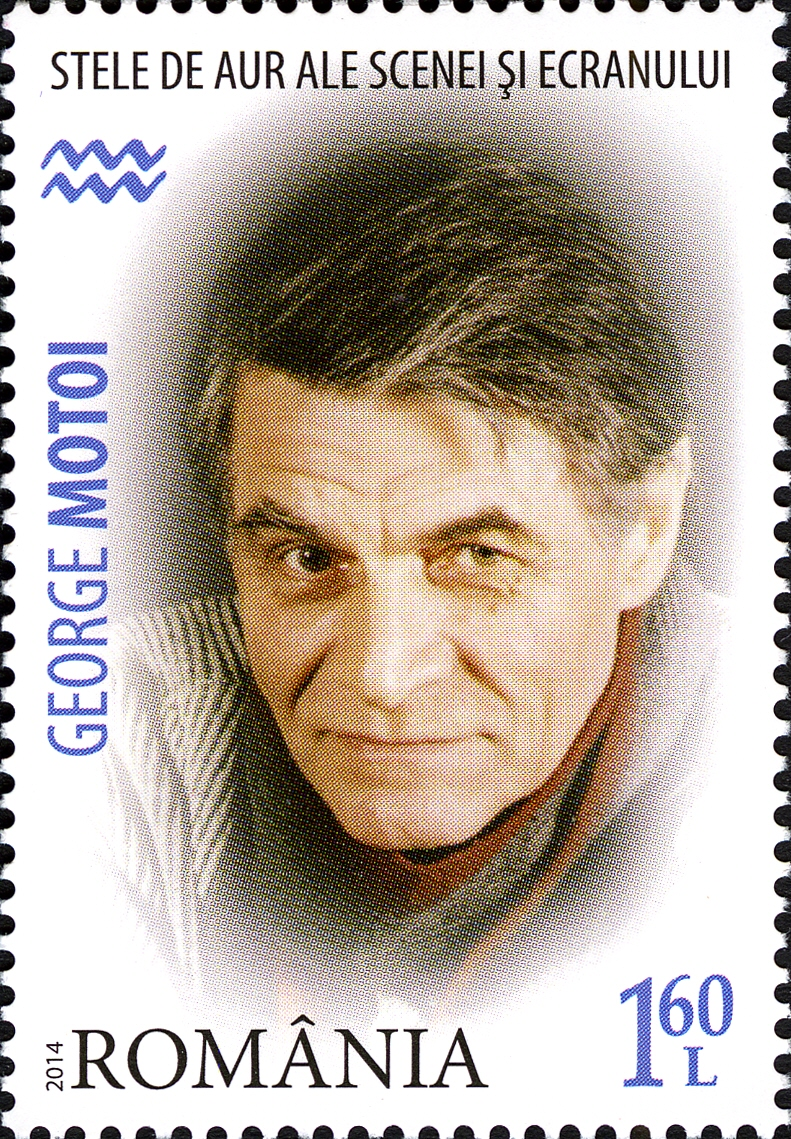
- George Motoi on a 2014 Romanian stamp
- Born: 22 January 1936; Arman, Caliacra County, Kingdom of Romania (now in Bulgaria)
- Died: 4 March 2015 (aged 79); Bucharest, Romania
- Occupation: Actor
- Years active: 1962-2005
- Spouses: Cezara Dafinescu; Giliola Motoi

George Motoi (22 January 1936 – 4 March 2015) was a Romanian actor. He appeared in more than thirty films from 1962 to 2005.

== Selected filmography ==
Year	Title	Role	Notes
1962	Lupeni 29	M. Drăgan	
1969	Kingdom in the Clouds		
1973	Explosion	Marinescu	
1975	Pe aici nu se trece	SS Captain Reinhardt	
1983	Trandafirul galben		
1985	The Silver Mask		
1986	Colierul de turcoaze		
2009	State de România	Marcel Popeanga Sr.	
2010	Iubire și onoare	Octav	
