= Sunday at Six =

Sunday at Six Duminică la ora 6
- Directed by: Lucian Pintilie
- Written by: Horia Pătraşcu; Lucian Pintilie
- Starring: Irina Petrescu; Dan Nuțu
- Cinematography: Sergiu Huzum
- Distributed by: Filmstudio București
- Release date: 1966
- Running time: 76 minutes
- Country: Romania
- Language: Romanian

Sunday at Six (Romanian: Duminică la ora 6) is a 1966 black-and-white psychological romance film by Romanian director Lucian Pintilie.

== Cast ==
- Irina Petrescu as Anca
- Dan Nuțu as Radu
- Constantin Cojocaru
- Eugenia Bosânceanu as mother of Radu
- Eugenia Popovici as mother of Anca
- Graziela Albini as Maria
- Costel Constantinescu as worker Nea Manole
- Cătălina Pintilie
- Marcel Gingulescu
- Dorina Nila-Bentamar as a girl
- Lidia Gabor
- Șerban Holban
