= Pintea =

Pintea is a surname. Notable people with the surname include:

- Adrian Pintea (1954–2007), Romanian actor
- Crina Pintea (née Ailincăi; born 1990), Romanian handballer
- Gherman Pântea or Pîntea (1894–1968), Bessarabian-born soldier, civil servant and political figure
- Horatio Pintea (born 1962), Canadian table tennis player
- Pintea the Brave (Grigore Pintea, 1670-1703), Romanian heroic rebel
- Valentin Pîntea (born 1962) is a Romanian gymnast
- Vasile Pîntea (born 1951), Moldovan politician
