= Gheorghe Vitanidis =

Romanian film director

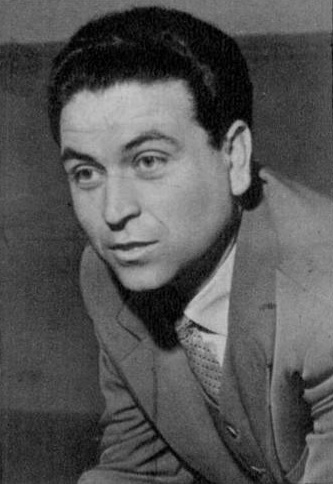
- în Cinema, 1963
- Born: 1 October 1929; Mangalia, Romania
- Died: 25 November 1994 (aged 65); Athens, Greece
- Education: Caragiale National University of Theatre and Film
- Occupation: Film director
- Years active: 1958–1987
- Employer(s): Caragiale National University of Theatre and Film

Gheorghe Vitanidis (1 October 1929 – 25 November 1994) was a Romanian film director. He directed 19 films between 1958 and 1987. His 1969 film A Woman for a Season was entered into the 6th Moscow International Film Festival. His 1979 film The Moment was entered into the 11th Moscow International Film Festival.

Born in Mangalia and of Greek descent, he graduated in 1953 from the I.L. Caragiale Institute of Theatre and Film Arts (IATC) in Bucharest. He made his debut in 1958 as assistant director for The Thistles of the Baragan, a Franco-Romanian film directed by Louis Daquin; the film was nominated for the Golden Palm award at the 1958 Cannes Film Festival. From 1961 to 1989, Vitanidis was a professor at the IATC, where he was head of the Film Directing Department. He died in 1994 in Athens, Greece.

== Selected filmography ==
- Ciulinii Bărăganului (The Thistles of the Baragan, 1958)
- Băieții noștri (1960)
- Post restant (1962)
- Gaudeamus igitur (1965)
- Șeful sectorului suflete (1967)
- A Woman for a Season (1969)
- Facerea lumii (1971)
- Ciprian Porumbescu (1973)
- Cantemir (1975)
- Mușchetarul român (1975)
- Casa de la miezul nopții (1976)
- The Moment (1979)
- Burebista (1980)
- Dragostea și revoluția (1983)
- The Silver Mask (1985)
- Colierul de turcoaze (1986)
- În fiecare zi mi-e dor de tine (1988)
