= Irina Petrescu =

Romanian actress

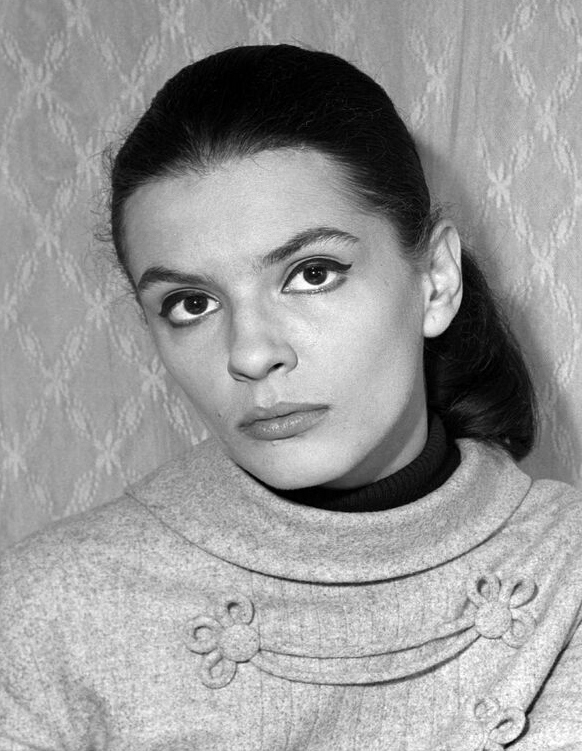
- Petrescu in 1968
- Born: Irina Carmen Petrescu; 19 June 1941; Bucharest, Romania
- Died: 19 March 2013 (aged 71); Bucharest, Romania
- Occupation: Actress
- Years active: 1959–2010
- Awards: Order of the Star of Romania, Officer class

Irina Carmen Petrescu (19 June 1941 – 19 March 2013) was a Romanian film actress. She appeared in 29 films between 1959 and 2010. She won the award for Best Actress at the 6th Moscow International Film Festival for her role in the 1969 film A Woman for a Season.

== Early life and career ==
She was born in 1941 in Bucharest, the daughter of Constantin and Elena Petrescu. She graduated from the Institute of Theatre and Film I.L. Caragiale, class of 1963, under the guidance of teachers Ion Șahighian and David Esrig. Irina Petrescu was noticed one day by director Savel Știopul, who came to her table in the Continental restaurant and asked her to audition for his film. The film has not done, but the audition was shown to Liviu Ciulei, who searched for – and found – an interpreter for Ana's role in "Waves of the Danube". At that time Petrescu was only 17 years old. For the Institute she also prepared with Știopul, who insisted to give the exam, and she had gotten in reciting lyrics of Mihai Eminescu and a fable by Marcel Breslașu.

In 2000, Petrescu was awarded by Romanian President Emil Constantinescu the Order of the Star of Romania, Officer class.

She died in 2013 at Elias Hospital after a long battle with breast cancer, and was buried at the Reînvierea Cemetery in the Colentina neighborhood of Bucharest.

== Selected filmography ==
- Waves of the Danube (1959)
- Nu vreau să mă însor (1961), as Rodica Barbu
- Poveste sentimentală (1961)
- Pași spre lună (1963), as Artemis
- Străinul (1964), as the student Sonia Mureșan
- The White Moor (1965)
- Story of My Foolishness (1966), as Jacqueline
- Sunday at Six (1966)
- Diminețile unui băiat cuminte (1967), as the librarian Mariana
- Șeful sectorului suflete (1967), as the chemist Magdalena
- A Woman for a Season (1969), as Ana Patriciu
- Facerea lumii (1971), as Eva
- Stejar – extremă urgență (1974), as the violinist Corina
- Dincolo de pod (1976), as the nun Aegidia
- Miss Christina (1992)
- Luxury Hotel (1992)
- The Human Resources Manager (2010)
