= Vladimir Găitan =

Romanian actor (1947–2020)

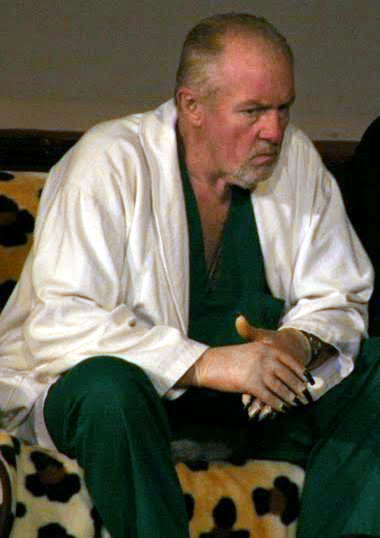
- Găitan in 2008
- Born: 2 February 1947; Suceava, Kingdom of Romania
- Died: 10 November 2020 (aged 73); Bucharest, Romania
- Resting place: Bellu Cemetery, Bucharest
- Occupation: Actor
- Years active: 1968–2020
- Spouse: Tünde Găitan
- Children: Alexandru, Gloria
- Awards: National Order of Faithful Service, Knight rank

Vladimir Găitan (Romanian pronunciation: [vladiˈmir ɡəjˈtan]; 2 February 1947 – 10 November 2020) was a Romanian actor.

== Biography ==
Born in Suceava, he studied at the Academy of Theatrical Arts and Cinematography in Bucharest, graduating in 1970.

Găitan appeared in more than forty films since 1968. In 2002, he was awarded the National Order of Faithful Service, Knight rank. He died on 10 November 2020 after fighting against lymphatic cancer, and was buried at Bellu Cemetery, in Bucharest.

== Selected filmography ==
Year	Title	Role	Notes
1968	The Reenactment	Nicu (Ripu)	
1975	Pe aici nu se trece	Petru	
1976	Accident	Ștefan Vlahu	
1979	Uncle Marin, the Billionaire	Airplane Pilot	
1979	Mihail, câine de circ	Policeman	
1980	Last Night of Love	Tudor Gheorghidiu	
1989	Mircea	Sigismund of Luxemburg	
1997	The Man of the Day		
2007	Inimă de țigan	Doctor Toma	
