= Ghioroc =

- Commune
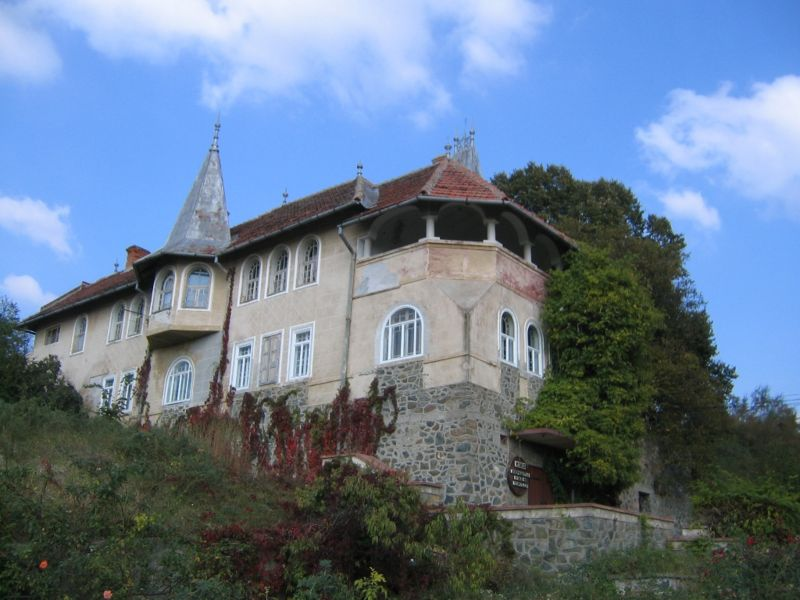
- Vineyard and wine museum in Ghioroc

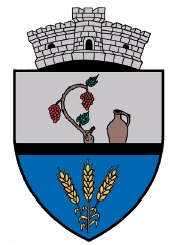
- Coat of arms

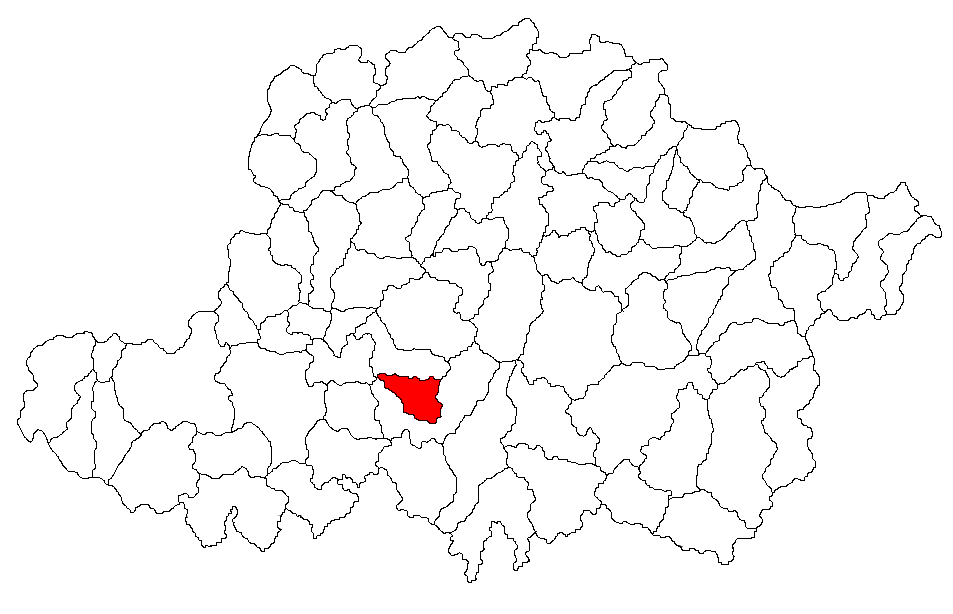
- Location in Arad County

- Location in Romania
- Coordinates: 46°09′N 21°35′E
- Country: Romania
- County: Arad

Government
  - Mayor (2024–2028): Corneliu Popi-Morodan (PNL)
- Area: 49.6 km^{2} (19.2 sq mi)
- Elevation: 132 m (433 ft)
- Population (2021-12-01): 3,871
  - Density: 78.0/km^{2} (202/sq mi)
- Time zone: UTC+02:00 (EET)
  - Summer (DST): UTC+03:00 (EEST)
- Postal code: 317135
- Area code: +40 x57
- Vehicle reg.: AR
- Website: primariaghioroc.ro

Ghioroc (Hungarian: Gyorok) is a commune in Arad County, Romania. Ghioroc commune is situated in the contact zone of the Zărand Mountains and the Arad Plateau, on the Matca channel, and it stretches over 4,890 ha (12,100 acres). It is composed of three villages: Cuvin (Aradkövi), Ghioroc (situated at 22 km (14 mi) from Arad), and Miniș (Ménes).

== Population ==
According to the 2011 census, the commune had 3,667 inhabitants, out of which 81.2% were Romanians, 17.1% Hungarians, 0.7% Ukrainians, 0.5% Germans, 0.3% Roma, and 0.2% are of other or undeclared nationalities.

== Natives ==
- Silvia Sorina Munteanu, opera singer

== History ==
The first documentary record of Ghioroc dates back to 1135. Cuvin was attested documentarily in 1323, while Miniș in 1302.

== Economy ==
The economy of the locality is mainly agricultural, both component sectors are well developed. The commune is known as an important vine-growing centre both in the country and abroad, although few tourists visit the area.

== Tourism ==
Among the show-places of Ghioroc commune we can mention the Roman Catholic church from 1779 to 1781, the Orthodox church with its patron saint called "Sfântul Mucenic Dimitrie" dating back to 1793, the monument put up to the heroes killed in the battles in 1944, the Museum of Vine and Wine, as well as the Agricole Museum. Beside these, Ghioroc Lake is another attractive place. Unfortunately, the village is spoilt by unrestricted use of the local roads by heavy trucks using the nearby sandpits. This is leading to serious damage to the local roads, and structural damage to many local buildings. Although there are weight and speed limits on these roads, no attempt is made to enforce them by local police. Some attempts have been made improve local facilities using EU money, such as a 'park' close to the local lake, but this has also failed due to lack of provision for maintenance, or poor planning and execution.
