= Vlad Țepeș (film) =

- Directed by: Doru Năstase
- Starring: Ștefan Sileanu; Ernest Maftei
- Release date: 8 January 1979
- Running time: 114 minutes
- Country: Romania
- Language: Romanian

Vlad Țepeș is a 1979 Romanian historical drama film directed by Doru Năstase. The film recounts the story of Vlad the Impaler (also known as Vlad Dracula), the mid-15th century Voivode of Wallachia, and his fights with the Ottoman Turks on the battlefield and with the Boyars in his court.

Commissioned by the Communist authorities, the movie promoted the line that Nicolae Ceaușescu had drawn through the July Theses of 1971, by projecting the image of a strong, authoritarian leader who is right with the people. It also had the purpose to wash the name of the voivode from the shame caused by Bram Stoker's novel. The fabrication of the myth of Dracula is highlighted in the film: it was built by outside elements (on the one hand, the Saxon and Szekler merchants from Brașov, and on the other, the enemies of Wallachia, the Turks), but also by the wicked and traitorous boyars.

== Plot ==
In 1456, Vlad Țepeș seizes control of Wallachia as its voivode. Outraged at how the country has fallen into ruin under boyar rule, he undertakes drastic measures to restore law and order, going as far as to invite all bandits in his realm to a banquet and massacre them in a fire. The boyars unsuccessfully rebel, and are then ordered impaled by Vlad. A few surviving boyars flee to Transylvania, where they conspire with a group of Saxon traders to intrigue against Vlad and spread propaganda against him. The boyars rally around a claimant to Vlad’s throne, Dan, who is defeated by Vlad when he tries to invade Wallachia. Vlad orders a captured Dan to dig his grave.

In 1459, the Ottomans send envoys to Vlad’s court demanding payment of tribute and slaves for the janissary corps. Vlad has nails impaled onto their heads when the envoys refuse to remove their turbans. In response, the Ottoman Sultan launches an invasion of Wallachia and grooms Vlad’s brother, Radu the Handsome, as voivode. Vlad’s forces impale advance Ottoman parties to terrorize the invaders and implement a scorched earth policy. As the Turks approach Vlad’s capital, Vlad disguises himself as a Turk and infiltrates the Ottoman camp, where he assassinates the Sultan in his tent. The night attack, compounded by Wallachian assaults, results in the Turks killing each other through friendly fire, depleting their forces and forcing them to retreat.

The next day, Vlad’s rejoicing is cut short when he learns that he killed the wrong person and that the Sultan is still alive. He also learns that Radu’s forces had captured the families of his followers and have been holding them hostage in Braila. Vlad orders his men to surrender, sparing their families from execution, while he himself flees to Hungary to seek help from King Matthias Corvinus. However, Vlad’s enemies in Transylvania forge a letter claiming to prove that Vlad is conspiring with the Ottomans to invade Hungary, resulting in Vlad being arrested when he arrives at Rucăr to meet with the King.

An epilogue states that Vlad was imprisoned by the Hungarians before he was released with the help of Stefan the Great in 1475, and that he then retook the voivodeship of Wallachia, only to be betrayed and killed after just two months.

== Cast ==
- Ștefan Sileanu – Vlad the Impaler
- Ernest Maftei – Străjer Mânzila
- Emanoil Petruț – Armaș Stoica
- Teofil Vâlcu – Boyar Albu
- Alexandru Repan – Sultan Mehmed the Conqueror
- Constantin Codrescu – Iunus Beg, envoy of the Sultan
- George Constantin – Metropolite of Ungro-Wallachia
- Ion Marinescu – Grand Vizier Mahmud Pasha
- Silviu Stănculescu – Treasurer Sava
- Vasile Cosma – Boyar Mogoș
- György Kovács – Michael Szilágyi, captain of Belgrade Fortress
- Mihai Pălădescu – Pope Pius II
- Andrei Bursaci – Boyar Rătundu
- András Csiky – Johannes Reudel, Vicar of Biserica Neagră, envoy of Brașov
- Eugen Ungureanu – Matthias Corvinus, King of Hungary
- Zoltán Vadász
- Zephi Alșec – Ottoman dignitary
- Ștefan Radof – Wallachian merchant
- Ștefan Velniciuc – Stephen the Great, Prince of Moldavia
