= Ion Anton =

Moldovan writer

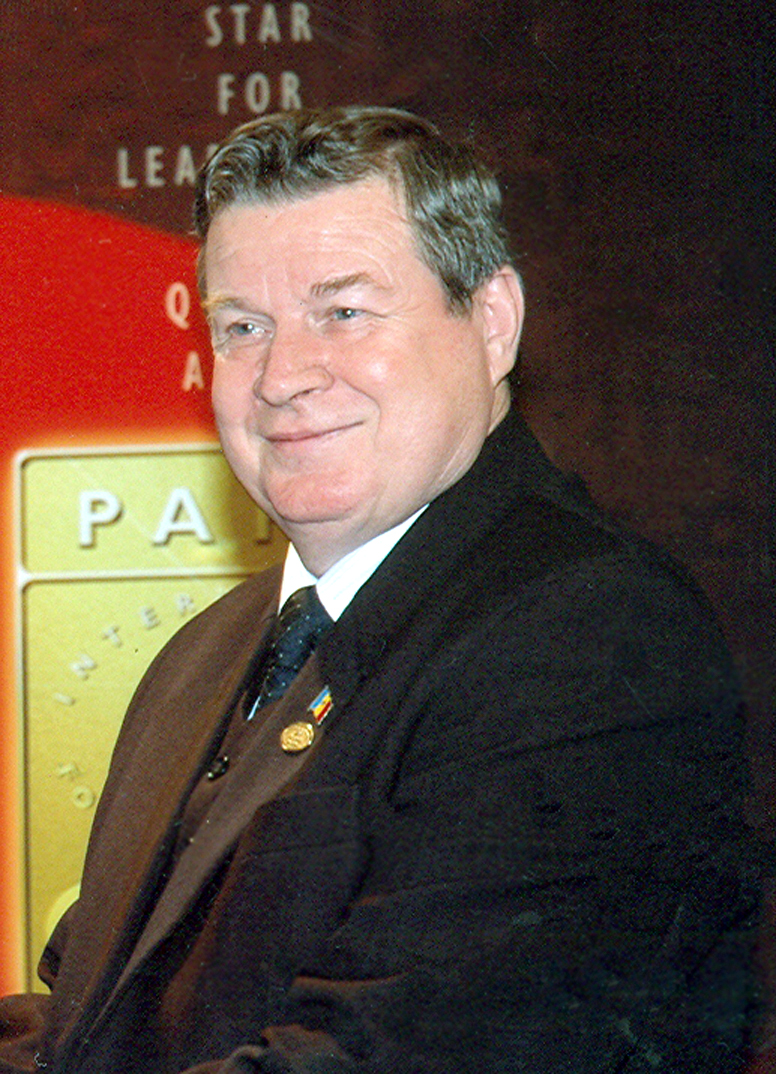
Anton in 2008

Ion Anton (born 3 December 1950) is a Moldovan writer. He is a member of the Moldovan Writers' Union and the Writers' Union of Romania.
