= Drumul oaselor =

- Directed by: Doru Năstase
- Written by: Eugen Barbu; Nicolae Paul Mihail
- Produced by: Gheorghe Pîrîu; Constantin Dinu; Lidia Popiță-Mohor
- Starring: Florin Piersic; Marga Barbu; Ion Marinescu; Iurie Darie; Ernest Maftei
- Cinematography: Vivi Drăgan Vasile
- Music by: George Grigoriu
- Production company: Casa de Filme 5
- Distributed by: Româniafilm
- Release date: 19 May 1980
- Running time: 116 minutes
- Country: Romania
- Language: Romanian

Drumul oaselor (lit. The Road of Bones), is a 1980 Romanian adventure film directed by Doru Năstase. The film is the first in the Mărgelatu series, a set of Western-inspired which center on the eponymous protagonist (Florin Piersic), a mysterious gunslinger who assists revolutionaries in 1840s Wallachia. The cast also includes Marga Barbu, Ion Marinescu, Iurie Darie, and Ernest Maftei.

The film focuses on a group of revolutionary boyars who come into possession of a treasure left behind by Tudor Vladimirescu. The boyars, with the help of Mărgelatu, transport the treasure, as well as a letter proving its authenticity, through Wallachia to hand the treasure and letter to an envoy named "The Yellow Rose" in order to purchase arms. Along the way, the boyars are pursued by the forces of the prince.

== Production ==
Novelist Eugen Barbu and screenwriter Nicolae Paul Mihail wrote the film's script. Barbu had written six scripts for a previous series called Haiducii, one of which cowritten with Mihail. The success of Haiducii inspired Barbu and Mihail to collaborate on another series of six films, which became the Mărgelatu series. Doru Năstase was selected to direct the film due to the success of his historical drama Vlad Țepeș. Indoor portions of the film were shot in the studios of the Bucharest Film Production Center. The music is performed by the Romanian Radiotelevision Orchestra conducted by Sile Dinicu.
