= Colierul de turcoaze =

1986 film directed by Gheorghe Vitanidis

- Directed by: Gheorghe Vitanidis
- Starring: Marga Barbu; Florin Piersic
- Release date: 3 March 1986
- Running time: 92 minutes
- Country: Romania
- Language: Romanian

Colierul de turcoaze is a 1986 Romanian action film directed by Gheorghe Vitanidis.

== Cast ==
- Marga Barbu - Agatha Slatineanu
- Florin Piersic - Margelatu
- Szabolcs Cseh - Buza de iepure
- Alexandru Repan - Serge Troianoff
- Ion Besoiu - prince
- George Motoi - lt. Deivos
- Jean Constantin - „profesorul” Aurică
- Constantin Codrescu - C.A. Rosetti
- Jean Lorin Florescu -
- Olga Delia Mateescu -
- George Motoi -
- Corado Negreanu -
- David Ohanesian -
- George Pitis -
- Rodica Popescu Bitănescu -
