= Szabolcs Cseh =

Romanian actor (1942–2014)

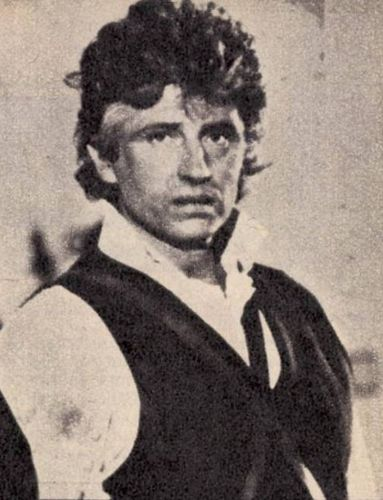
Szabolcs Cseh, 1983

Szabolcs Cseh a.k.a. Szobi Czeh (1942 – August 1, 2014) was Romanian stuntman and actor of Székely origin.

== Biography ==
Szabolcs Cseh was born in Miercurea Ciuc, Székely Land to ethnic Hungarians Székelys. He graduated from the Institute of Physical Culture (now National University of Physical Education and Sport in Bucharest in 1966. Next year he started his career of stuntman in the film Dacii. He worked in over 150 feature and TV films, as a stuntman or stunt coach. Since 1975 he also worked in Germany with studies DEFA ( East Germany) and Tele (Munich).

While being a student he started his career of stuntman, in the film Dacii (released in 1967).

in 1990, he founded the first Romanian association of stunt professionals. He also taught acting and stunt classes in the I. L. Caragiale National University of Theatre and Film.

Since 2005 he was running the Asociatia Gladiator social program for disadvantaed children aimed at prevention juvenile delinquency.

He died of bone cancer on August 1, 2014.

== Personal ==
He was married second time to Simona Cseh (14 years younger than him; they were married for about 40 years) and they had two sons.

== Awards an decorations ==
He is a recipient of multiple national and foreign awards.

- 2014: Knight of the Order of the Star of Romania
- 2010: Knight of the National Order of Faithful Service
