= Jean Constantin =

Romanian actor (1927–2010)

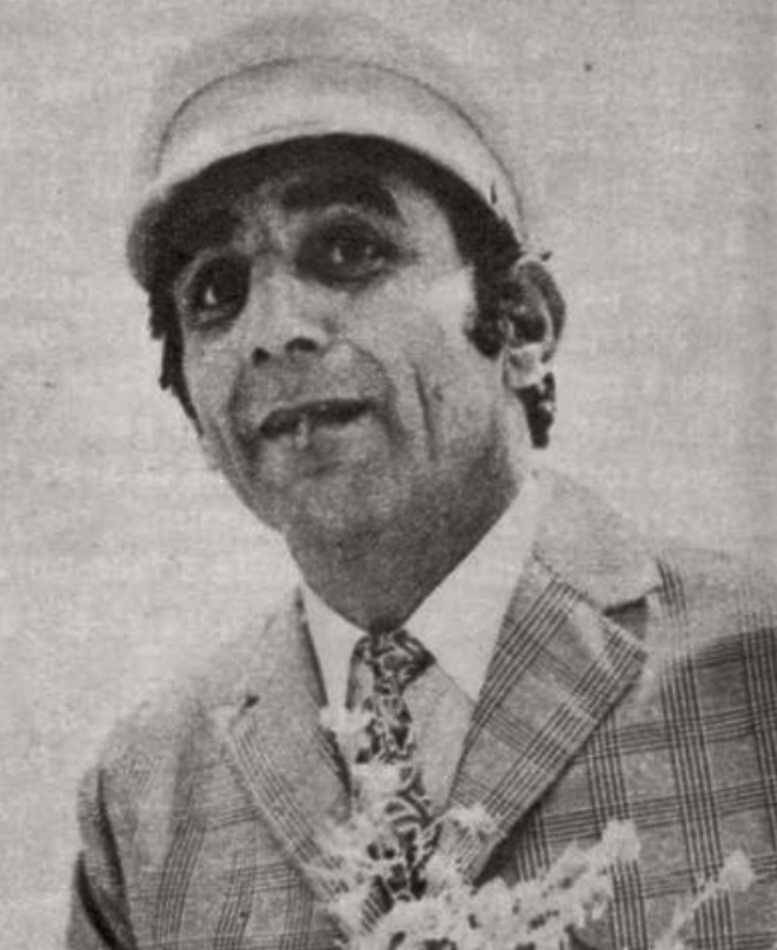
- Jean Constantin in 1971
- Born: Constantin Cornel Jean; 21 August 1927; Techirghiol, Kingdom of Romania
- Died: 26 May 2010 (aged 82); Constanța, Romania
- Occupations: Actor, singer, dancer, puppeteer, television host, laborer, accountant
- Years active: c. 1950–2010
- Spouse(s): Mioara Mocanu (div.); Nina Ciocea (div.); Nina Petcu
- Parent(s): Caliopi Stavreg Zaharia; Dumitru Jean
- Awards: National Revue Prize (1998); UNITER Lifetime Achievement (2003); Gopo Lifetime Achievement (2008)
- Military career
- Allegiance: Romanian People's Republic
- Branch: Land Forces
- Service years: 1949–1952
- Rank: Sergeant Major
- Unit: 9th border regiment

Constantin Cornel Jean, known professionally as Jean Constantin (Romanian pronunciation: [ʒaŋ konstanˈtin]; 21 August 1927 – 26 May 2010), was a Romanian actor and singer, recognized locally as one of the greatest comedians of his generation. Born into a mixed family, he prioritized his Greek ethnicity, while also allowing directors to racially typecast him as a Romani man, and using his comparatively dark complexion for humorous effect. He never had formal training in the theatrical arts, evolving through amateur productions during his early years—when he was a construction foreman, trade unionist, and accountant. Jean had his breakthrough in the 1950s, when he became permanently employed by Fantasio, a revue troupe in Constanța. He was recognized by critics for his naturalness, and well-liked by the public for the comedic duo he formed with Gelu Manolache. He was co-opted as a character actor in Romanian cinema during the 1960s, earning good reviews for his dramatic roles in Maiorul și moartea and Prea mic pentru un război atît de mare. Overall, he preferred lighter films, and was praised for comedic roles in box-office hits by Dinu Cocea, Mircea Drăgan, Sergiu Nicolaescu and Geo Saizescu, as well as in the police-procedural series Brigada Diverse. Also distinguished for work in humorous programs for the Romanian Television, and a star of its miniseries Toate pînzele sus, he endured as one of the most popular actors in Communist Romania during the 1970s and '80s.

Jean's standing in sketch comedy and the revue genre was preserved after the fall of communism in 1989, though he struggled to make ends meet. The quality of the film roles he was offered declined sharply during the transition to capitalism, with sex comedies that bordered on the pornographic. He was also a frequent guest at comedy shows performed abroad for the Romanian diaspora, thus supplementing his regular income—in this context, he renounced his collaboration with Manolache, and formed a comedy team with Stela Popescu and Alexandru Arșinel. Jean was critical of the new capitalist society, but was not interested in politicizing his comedic material; he also kept very discreet about his personal life, including his marriage, only commenting on it to fend off rumors that he was having affairs with young debutantes.

Throughout his final years, Jean was the host and star attraction of variety shows, which also involved traditional music acts and pop stars such as Mădălina Manole. The formula was highly successful, and led to his name being fraudlently used in advertising rival shows. From 1991, he was also an occasional presenter of entertainment programs on TVR 1. Later that decade, he switched to the commercial station Pro TV, and then to its rival, Antena 1; his fame was also preserved by his presence in advertisements for vodka. Ignoring his debilitating heart illness, he continued to act to his final days, and gave a final, celebrated, dramatic performance in The Way I Spent the End of the World (2006)—his only collaboration with the "Romanian New Wave" in cinema. He was a recipient of the Gopo Lifetime Achievement for 2008.

== Biography ==
=== Early life and debut ===
The future actor was born Constantin Cornel Jean on 21 August 1927. Some confusion was maintained as to this date, with sources also using "1928"; Jean sometimes presented himself as younger, once giving his birth year as 1931. His place of origin was the small town of Techirghiol—he was precisely born in a since-demolished mahala formed around Pericle Macri's brick factory. He had eight siblings, including a sister, Ileana, who achieved local notoriety as a poet and teacher of literature. The family's ethnic background was for long unclear, since Constantin was typecast as Romani (by 2000, he had had six explicitly "Gypsy" roles in his film career alone), and often proudly presented himself as such to his public. As late as 1995, Florin Cioabă, self-proclaimed "King of the Romanies", claimed Jean as one of his nominal subjects. He was known as having partial Greek ethnicity, from a family of immigrants which had long settled in Northern Dobruja; he once acknowledged that his father, Dumitru Jean, was an ethnic Romanian architect, and that he owed his Greek heritage to his mother, Caliopi Stavreg Zaharia. In one version of the story, he presented Caliopi as a recent immigrant from the Kingdom of Greece, and further specified that Dumitru was an Aromanian, while describing himself as "totally Greek."

Jean also spoke of the racial confusion in a 1989 humorous interview, wherein he noted that, though identifying as Greek, he had to abide by his light-skinned colleagues, who wanted him to act as "having just fallen off a tree, the first of my family not to sport a tail." He reported that fellow actor Ștefan Bănică Sr., whom he regarded as genuinely Romani, always bore him a grudge, "say[ing] that I had stolen all of his parts." As observed by film critic Irina Margareta Nistor, Jean also played into racial stereotypes, constantly depicting himself as a "crow". He grew up in a multi-ethnic environment, and quickly learned mannerisms associated with various groups, integrating them into his performances. His best friends included a local Albanian actor who incidentally shared his attributed surname—Nicu Constantin. In 1996, the latter cast doubt on Jean's ethnic affiliations, arguing that his Dumitru Jean had in fact been Romani, and that Jean himself was passing for white: "[Jean] is Greek through his mother, who was named Caliopi, whereas his father was a 'lawyer', a 'bricklayer', an 'architect' in his spare time, when he was not out there playing the cimbalom." Such skepticism was described in a 1987 epigram by Al. Clenciu, which claimed to render Jean's side of the story:

Ce spun dușmanii sunt 'gogoși'!
Vă dau cuvântul de onoare
Că am 'pigmentul' de la soare
Și nicidecum de la strămoși.

Translation:

Oh please allow me to react,
Dispelling that egregious "hint":
It's from the sun I got my "tint",
Not from my genes—and that's a fact!

A member of the Romanian Orthodox Church, Jean always celebrated Saint Constantine's Feast (21 May) as his name day. He tolerated the inversion of name and surname, which was documented as far back as 1955, though he informed his fans of their mistake when they congratulated him on Saint John's Day. Jean was born when Romania was still under a monarchic regime; he completed his early education at No 3 School in the local hub of Constanța, where Dumitru had moved. He had a variety of jobs, with stints as a bricklayer, apprentice shoemaker, and confectioner, before being sent to study technical drawing at the Higher School of Arts and Crafts in Bucharest; at the peak of World War II, he pestered the street vendors of Constanța by posing as a health inspector, supplementing his income with their bribes. Jean's later youth was spent during the early stages of the Romanian communist regime. He was as a stevedore in the Port of Constanța (1947–1949), where he and his colleagues formed an "artistic brigade". His first stage role was in a communist play authored by another dockworker, Ion Drăgănescu, and inspired by the Greek Civil War. Jean and Ilarion Ciobanu were cast as imperialistic bad guys seeking to destroy the Democratic Army. For a while, Jean also worked on the railway between Bumbești-Jiu and Livezeni. He did his Land Forces service at the 9th border regiment in Turnu Severin, which was back then on high alert due to the Yugoslav crisis. His army comrades included the future film director Iulian Mihu, who greatly enjoyed his antics and wrote rudimentary plays for him to act in.

Jean was honorably discharged as a sergeant major in 1952. Returning to his Dobrujan home, he became a foreman on the Danube–Black Sea Canal. He received a professional certification in construction, but his main work was as an accountant at the Metallurgical Equipment Enterprise in Medgidia. He subsequently gained more exposure as an amateur actor, involved directly in spreading anti-capitalist agitprop, and taking a regional prize in 1954. Also in 1954, as a member of the Trade Unions' House of Culture (CCS), Jean was cast in Isaak Dunayevsky's operetta, Wind of Liberty, taking his first national prize. Since his adolescence, he had also been remarked for his talents as a ballroom dance. In 1955, the CCS, which occupied the greater part of Constanța Casino, had him as a salaried dance instructor. The institution also established the local tradition in puppet theater, and Jean was involved from the start, handling marionettes in a May 1955 production of Mashenka and The Bear. He lived for a while on the Casino grounds, in a small room with no plumbing. During one of his trips to the bathroom, the pajama-wearing Jean stumbled upon government inspectors, who were displeased by the sight; as a result, he was moved into a state-owned seaside apartment, on Cristea Georgescu Street.

=== Revue breakthroughs ===
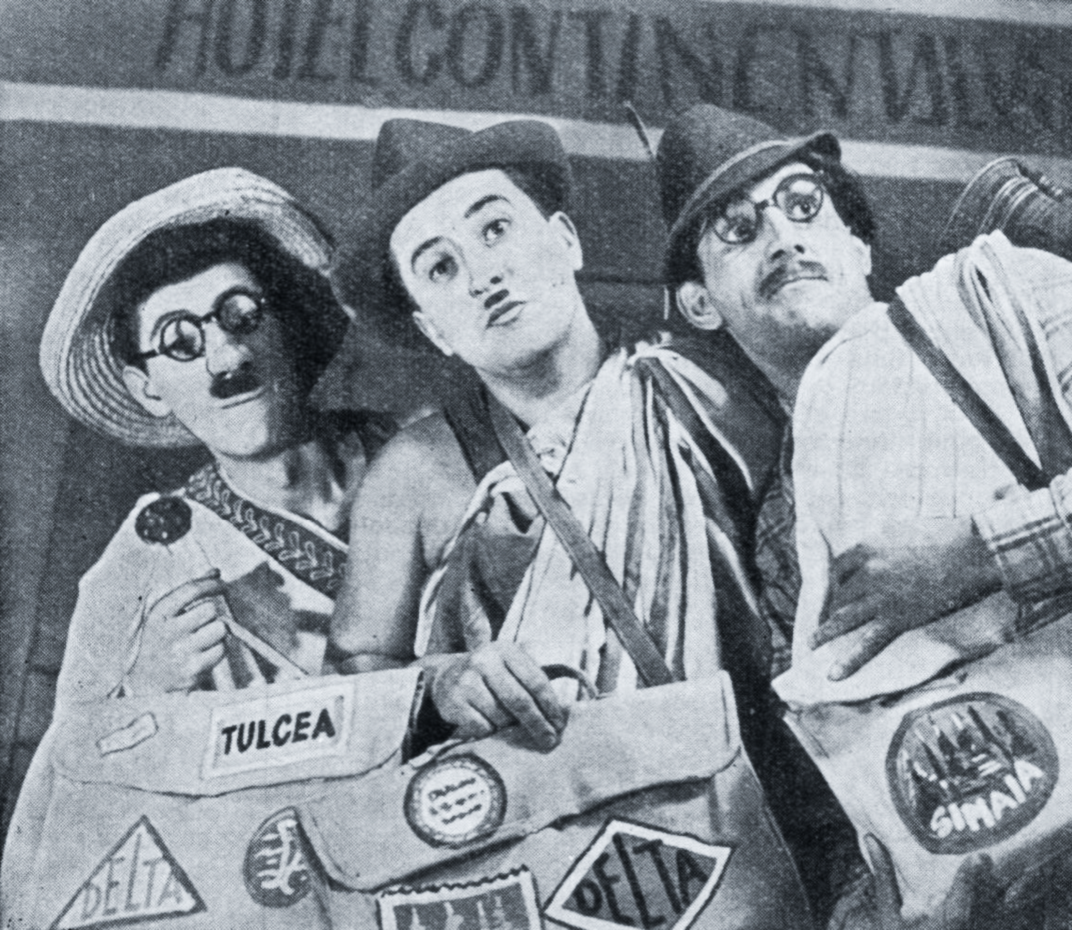
Jean (first from the right) with Gelu Manolache and Ion Duțu in Mozaic–Constanța, staged by Fantasio Theater in June 1963

Jean's successes as an actor resulted in his permanent employment by Constanța's municipal theater, "Fantasio", though he never pursued formal training in the field. His professional debut occurred in 1957, as a member of Fantasio's revue section. His first contribution was in a show called Estrada pe satelit—his first-ever role as a Romani (Ursar) man; he came to be trusted by director Ion Drugan, who offered him his first in-depth roles. Jean's biographer, Jean Badea, looks back on most of these productions as "trivial" and "embarrassing", noting that they mostly circulated the tropes of communist propaganda, which the actors themselves were unable to bypass. In late 1959, Jean found a decades-long comedic partner in Gelu Manolache, who acted as a straight man in most of their shared productions. These were his favorite acts, and he reportedly never missed them. On one occasion, he showed up for one such act fresh from a car crash, with an orthopedic cast on his arm. Looking back on the period in 1994, he noted: "They only cast me in the negative roles, always a thief, a rascal, a prowler, a 'colorful' fella. [...] I created myself a niche of my own, one that the public enjoys."

At Fantasio, Jean helped in establishing a small puppet theater, and was himself a leading puppeteer—by his own account, he still enjoyed this secondary career, for which he was greatly skilled. In 1960, he was "Spiridon" in the revue La mare și... la mai mare, earning praise for his subtlety, as well as for his "robust and seemly humor". Also that year, Jean appeared in Jean Delannoy's Baron of the Locks—this being the first of his eighty-plus film roles. In 1963, Jean was starring in Coana Chirița comedies, based on classical texts by Vasile Alecsandri, at a time when these were being revived as a revue at Fantasio. His version of Guliță, the play's secondary character, was praised by critic Florian Potra for its "outstanding vitality"; Potra was additionally impressed by his and Manolache's "vivacious" performance in a more regular revue, Mozaic–Constanța.

By his own account, Jean only became nationally famous after being cast in Procesul alb, a 1965 film directed by Mihu; this was also his first time sharing the screen with Toma Caragiu, who, as a police investigator, was required to beat him (according to Jean, Caragiu was instructed not to hold back, "so that [Jean] will 'feel' the slap"). Though selected by Mihu mainly for his apparent exoticism, suited to his character's standing as a "lovable scoundrel", he was enthusiastically welcomed by film chroniclers, and received immediate offers from 24 other directors. Jean and Jorj Voicu had small comedic parts in Manole Marcus' Zodia Fecioarei, which was filmed at Vama Veche in summer 1966. According to reviewer Călin Căliman, their satirical cameos were enjoyable, but did not fit in with the narrative structure. Jean followed up with a major role as a professional burglar in the 1967 release Maiorul și moartea. While the film was largely forgotten by the public, critics remarked that his performance was highly nuanced and entirely commendable.

Jean also filmed under director Ion Niță for the 1968 comedy Zile de vară, done from a screenplay by Fănuș Neagu. Căliman argued that the film should never have been produced, and that Jean had been required to do "ham acting" for the part of a Lăutar entertainer. By then, he was becoming a staple of comedic films, which were the only projects that brought him enjoyment. As such, he refused to appear as the militiaman in Lucian Pinitilie's The Reenactment (1968), being replaced there by Ernest Maftei. He did however agree to star in the Radu Gabrea's Prea mic pentru un război atît de mare (1969), which was his first dramatic performance (albeit as a cameo). He had another dramatic role, small but critically acclaimed, in Marcus' historical piece, Canarul și viscolul. Arriving at Constanța State Theater in 1969, David Esrig insisted on having Jean cast as Paolo in Carlo Goldoni's classical comedy, Villeggiatura. Though he received encouraging reviews, the show ended after only 20 runs. He was not offered a contract with that institution, largely because Fantasio would not share him.

=== Rise to fame ===
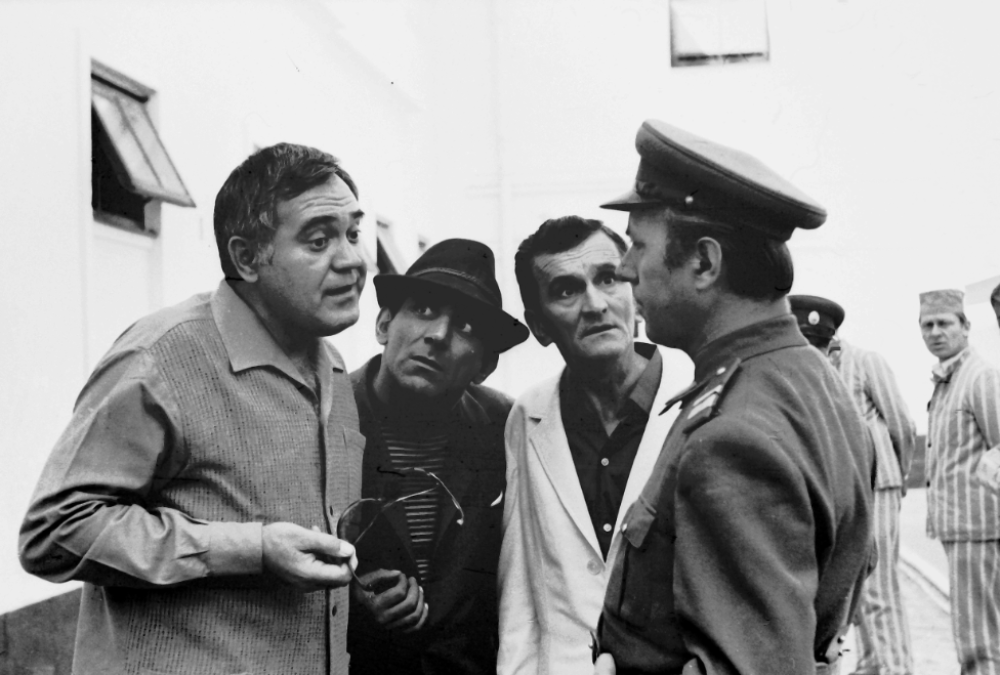
Jean alongside Dem Rădulescu, Puiu Călinescu, and a militiaman, in a prison scene from in Brigada Diverse intră în acțiune (1970)

Jean was featured as Parpanghel, a Romani man lost among the hajduks, in Dinu Cocea's adventure-comedy film, Răzbunarea haiducilor (1968). As Badea observes, he expanded on the small part created for him by writer Eugen Barbu, reinventing it into a central attraction; other chroniclers similarly describe Parpanghel as a "succulent role, befitting his talent". Literary scholar Angelo Mitchievici sees this contribution, with Parpanghel as "a courageous coward who is well-adjusted to life", as one of several proofs that affectionate portrayals of the Romanies have become important markers in Romanian culture. Jean returned to this role in Haiducii lui Șaptecai and Zestrea domniței Ralu (both released in 1971). Adio, dragă Nela!, a satire directed by Cornel Todea from another one of Neagu's screenplays, witnessed Jean's first run-in with the communist censors. The film was completed in 1972, but immediately shelved, and not shown in theaters until 1990.

Jean's reputation was established later in the 1970s, when he provided comic relief in a police-procedural series, Brigada Diverse, that began with Brigada Diverse în alertă!. By his own account, the films were "panned by some", but genuinely successful with the public, "and took in quite a lot of money." His collaboration with Dem Rădulescu and Puiu Călinescu as a "homogeneous crew of swindlers" is one of the most memorable trios in Romanian film history. Their on-screen presence as likable social parasites was in itself a subversion of communist morality. Though the project was supposed to have some eleven episodes, it was stopped abruptly after only three, allegedly because a general of the militia realized that his colleagues, rather than the offenders, were the ones being satirized.

As explained by Badea, Jean took on many engagements to facilitate his overspending habits—he once complained that he had become a "cash cow" to girls in the lower echelons of showbiz. His first marriage was to fellow puppeteer Mioara Mocanu; upon their divorce, he married a Fantasio ballerina, Nina Ciocea. Later in his film career, he was in high demand, but chose not to renounce his contract with Fantasio. As a result, he commuted between Constanța and the various film sets, and did most of his sleeping on trains. Jean only accepted film roles that he felt as "authentic". He agreed to appear in the 1973 Explosion only because the role had been especially created for him by screenwriter Ioan Grigorescu. Among the contemporary reviewers, Căliman was unimpressed, describing Jean's performance as "excessive ham acting". After having directed him on Explosion, Mircea Drăgan optioned Jean for the role of Țeelic, a Romani tribal leader, in the historical piece Frații Jderi. He performed that part for the duration of filming on location, but complained about being typecast; at the time, he was also featured as "Limbă" in Sergiu Nicolaescu's "Commissioner Roman" series of feature-length films, noting that he no longer hoped to gain more traction, or star in title roles.

Badea sees many of Jean's early film roles as "phoned in" for mediocre scripts, but adds: "whenever supported by a quality screenplay, Jean managed to polish his small roles, to uncover nuances in the typology of picturesque characters". He was also featured in comedy sketches aired on Romanian Television, and starred in its New Years' Eve programming. In the 1972–1973 edition, he earned praise for vignettes in which he appeared, alongside Brigada Diverse's Rădulescu, as a fumbling host of a New Year's party, and, on his own, as an alcohol vendor (described by comedic writer Liviu Timbus as "a Mitică of the atomic era"). The format was taken to live performances: in August 1973, Jean, Rădulescu and Amza Pellea headlined a variety show at Constanța Stadium, organized as part of the Serbările mării festival.

In another televised slot, aired on 31 December 1973, Jean and Bănică Sr. parodied the upcoming Ali–Frazier boxing match. At New Year's 1975, Jean appeared in the televised revue Noaptea de vis, rated by critic Ileana Colomieț as one of the best shows of its kind. According to Nistor, these shows, as well as similar appearances in the summer-vacation specials, revealed him as "thoroughly engaging and extremely charismatic". Badea claims that, despite his great attractiveness, he was underused by television producers, "under a sort of 'embargo'", since he was viewed as essentially tied to a provincial venue.

=== Mature roles ===
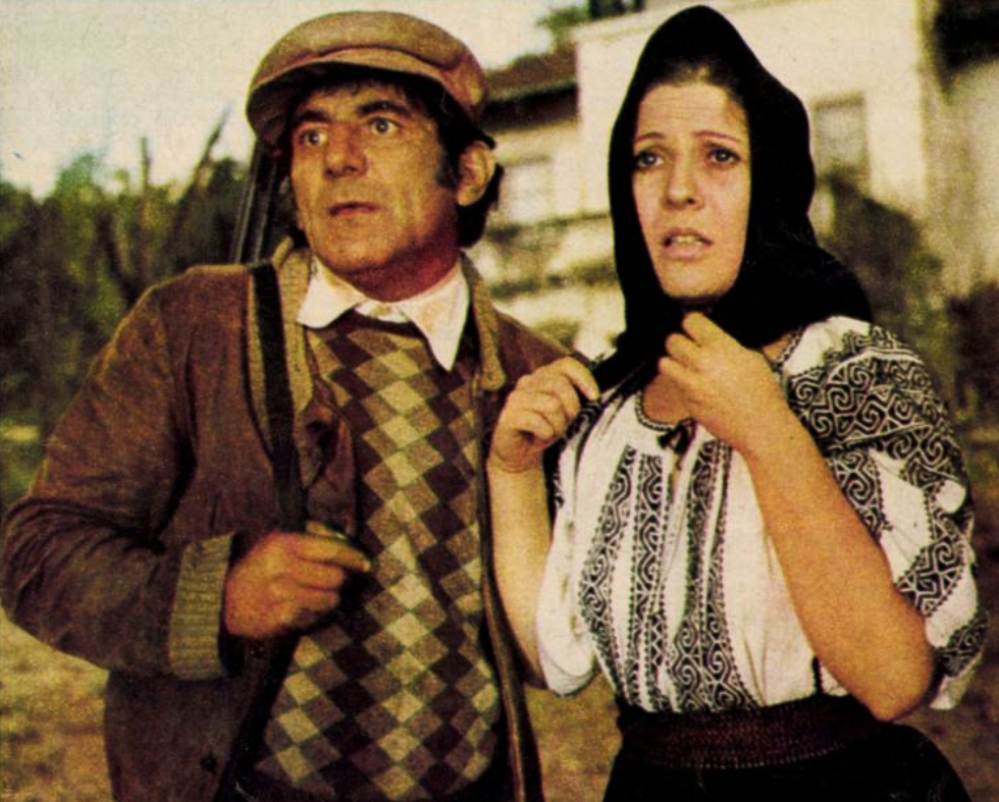
Jean and Dorina Lazăr in a film still from Mastodontul, 1975

Nicolaescu used Jean in another supporting role, with the "historical ballad" Nemuritorii (1974)—as observed by Căliman, Jean's contribution was one of the film's main attractions. Badea sees here a "timid start" to his return as a tragedian, consolidated in 1975, when he appeared as "Dekawe" in Mastodontul—according to Badea and various other critics, his contribution there was overwhelmingly beautiful. Also then, Mihu completed his bitter comedy, Nu filmăm să ne amuzăm. According to critic Șt. O. Mugur, his presence was the only attribute that made the film watchable. He provided comic relief in Francisc Munteanu and Ștefan Traian Roman's 1975 war drama, Evadarea. After 1976, Jean was especially beloved by young audiences for his role as Ismail the Turk in Mircea Mureșan's television miniseries, Toate pînzele sus, seen by critic Dana Duma as the "salt and pepper" of its ensemble cast. According to Mitchievici: "A picturesque, genuinely Levantine figure who speaks Romanian in a peculiar way, Jean Constantin has forever inscribed himself in our memory [as Ismail.]" As Badea notes, this effort showed that he could easily take on as a comedic lead, with glimpses of tragic seriousness. A period columnist, Nicolae Ulieru, was disappointed with the production, arguing that Ismail's on-screen moments were "facile", a "rudimentary solution" to keeping the public interested.

One of Jean's steadier on-screen collaborations was ended abruptly by the March 1977 earthquake, during which Caragiu was crushed to death. He visited the wreckage alongside Ion Besoiu, Florian Pittiș and Victor Rebengiuc, who caught a rare glimpse of him weeping uncontrollably. Drăgan reused Jean's talents in the 1977 production, Oil!, which also starred Ray Milland and Woody Strode. It came out at roughly the same time as Gloria nu cîntă, a musical film. Săptămîna columnist Radu Georgescu praised his cameo, "[done] with the love and passion that one generally reserves only for the greatest of roles". The same year, Mureșan released his police procedural, Împușcături sub clar de lună, in which Jean has a key role. According to critic Mircea Alexandrescu, this was a stretch, since he was never believable.

Geo Saizescu directed Jean in the crowd-pleaser Eu, tu și Ovidiu, with music by Temistocle Popa. Critic Alice Mănoiu argues that his "exotic-picturesque" contribution as Misică, a hypnotist-turned-trade unionist, was especially enjoyable; Badea calls it "fascinating". In the 1977 comedy, Acțiunea Autobuzul, Jean shared the screen with Draga Olteanu Matei, with critics noting that their partnership was somewhat artificial, effectively fishing for laughs. Various commentators suggest that Jean carried Munteanu's 1978 musical, Melodii, melodii, which would have otherwise been unbearable. His return as Limbă in the 1978 effort Revanșa came with more screen time, since Nicolaescu now wanted him as a sidekick to his heroic lead—resulting in a well-received "mix of suspense and tomfoolery." Mănoiu and fellow columnist D. I. Suchianu reserved praise for his performance as an over-the-top gangster in Nicolaescu's 1979 comedy, Uncle Marin, the Billionaire, listing it as one of the film's funnier aspects. Journalist Ecaterina Oproiu was amused by his Anglicized mannerisms, also suggesting that his temporary appearance in travesti was "a delightful moment for fans of the burlesque."

Jean satirized overenthusiastic "art brigades" in Andrei Blaier's football-themed comedy, Totul pentru fotbal, released in 1978. In one of the noted scenes, he exchanged lines with a real-life goalkeeper, Rică Răducanu, mocking the academic ambitions of Romanian athletes. Jean also appeared in the 1981 sequel, Am o idee!, helping to guarantee its commercial success. During the 1979–1980 season, he was under contract with the National Theater Bucharest (TNB), assigned to play Pristanda in Radu Beligan's version of the classical comedy, O scrisoare pierdută. While several chroniclers offered encouragement, writer Romulus Diaconescu was unimpressed, noting that he had "overdone his improvisation in a 'playful' style". During this moment of his career, he relied on his female prompter, whom he promised to marry after the premiere. He did so in 1980, his marriage to Nina Ciocea having since been terminated. Born Nina Petcu, Jean's third wife had previously been married to another actor, Gheorghe Cozorici.

Though well received by Bucharest's theatergoers, Jean could not sign a contract for the TNB, since he was again optioned by Fantasio. He and Rădulescu began touring Romania with another variety show, Ritmuri cu haz..., which was reportedly a major hit with the public by the time of its run at Craiova (June 1980). Jean was cast as "Bluferini" in Alecu Croitoru's 1980 film Al treilea salt mortal, which received mixed reviews. He was by then also working under Dan Pița for the Ostern The Oil, the Baby and the Transylvanians, which critics described as another memorable achievement. Here, he was Temistocle, a somber Orthodox priest and gravedigger, moving freely between comedy and drama. With Olteanu Matei, he gave a comedic performance in Cocea's own Ostern, Iancu Jianu, haiducul—released in 1981, with Adrian Pintea in the title role. Contemporary reviewers were unimpressed, discussing the duo as "frivolous" and demanding that Jean be "allowed or forced, at long last, to appear as something other than a Gypsy puppet." Also in 1981, Jean provided "a few moments of tiny humor" in Nicolaescu's war movie, Capcana mercenarilor, disliked by Badea for his "gratuitous buffoonery".

=== During late communism ===
Alongside Manolache and his other Constanța colleagues, Jean starred in the 1981–1982 show Fantasiorama, for which he received critical acclaim. In summer 1982, he was entertaining vacationers at Popasul Dobrogean restaurant in Mamaia. He had an "unusual cameo as a 'waggish' sailor" in Nicu Stan's first credit as a film director, Un echipaj pentru Singapore. Jean appeared as a construction worker in Munteanu's 1984 satirical film, Un petic de cer. Oproiu was impressed by his "eminently lovable" presence; according to Alexandrescu, Munteanu effectively exploited Jean, who managed to rescue an otherwise mediocre project. Also then, he and Sebastian Papaiani had supporting roles as petty fraudsters in Saizescu's Secret of Bacchus. He surprised the general public by choosing a more subdued or "laconic" method. According to Badea, this should be regarded as a comedic masterpiece, with Jean fully benefiting from a profound screenplay, the work of Titus Popovici. Saizescu then cast him in a "colorful role" for Sosesc păsările călătoare, done in early 1985 from Fănuș Neagu's script. It received mixed reviews, though Jean's effort was universally praised. Cocea's historical series was completed that same year by The Silver Mask, with Jean cast as a picturesque charlatan, "Professor Aurică". He appeared in the filmed version of Coana Chirița (1986), directed by Drăgan from Olteanu Matei's script. His screen time was reportedly met with "frantic applause" by moviegoers across the land.

In a 1982 interview, Jean looked back on his film career, describing his typical role as mixing a "fumbler" and a "crafty one". He denied that this was his real-life persona, and confessed that he did not enjoy the public attention he was always receiving. He also noted that he did not like appearing on Romanian Television, and he had only agreed to speak with its reporters on three occasions (once, alongside pop singer Aura Urziceanu). At some point in the early 1970s, he and Manolache had agreed to join the Romanian Communist Party, but, as Badea observes, only did so to fill a mandatory quota of showbiz professionals. As later noted by journalist Virgil Dumitrescu, Jean had always refrained from reciting odes to socialist patriotism—thus underscoring the point that such propaganda jobs were not mandatory, but only demanded by those who expected additional perks. The actor became mildly critical of the austerity policy introduced in the 1980s by communist leader Nicolae Ceaușescu, as well as of the mandatory personality cult. During one show at Fantasio, he joked that the frequent power outages were de la tablou (which could be understood as "from the distribution board", or as "from [Ceaușescu's] portrait"). Without ever claiming the status of a dissident, he made a point of listening to Radio Free Europe broadcasts. He only stopped when informed by someone in his entourage that continuing to do so would affect his eligibility for tours around the Western bloc.

Jean and Manolache still contributed to the state-run patriotic festival, Cîntarea României, during its parade of revue shows in summer 1986. As noted by critic Alecu Popovici, his humor relied "almost entirely on the bronze color of his skin", though he engaged audiences with "his tremendous comedic charm". He appeared alongside Marin Moraru in another Alecsandri-based movie, Chirița la Iași. Gheorghe Vitanidis directed him in the musical În fiecare zi mi-e dor de tine. In some ways a continuation of Gloria nu cîntă, it premiered during as a Cîntarea României segment in 1988. Vitanidis surprised critics by partnering him up with Marin Moraru, whose style of comedy was entirely different. In Badea's assessment, the experiment charmed audiences, but was never again reattempted, "another missed opportunity in [Jean's] so very controversial and fluctuating destiny." This period also saw the release of Secretul lui Nemesis, a Saizescu comedy that tried to revive the same formula as Bacchus. Badea notes that the effort was a failure, largely because Jean resorted to "old schemas".

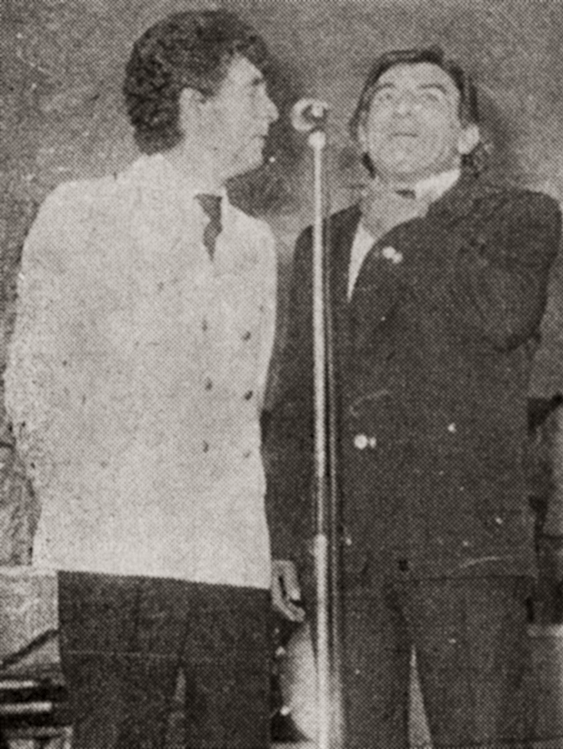
Jean and Manolache at Boema Revue Festival, Bucharest, August 1987

During the better years of Ceaușescu's regime, Jean had reportedly earned 1,400 lei as his base salary, and covered all his regular expenses with these. He activated his state pension in late 1987, thus formally ending his full-time contract at Fantasio, but without informing most of his friends of this decision. For a while, he mainly focused on regular collaborations with traditional music ensembles, including Brîulețul of Constanța, Chindia of Târgoviște, Călușul of Scornicești, and the folkloric section of Ploiești Philharmonic Orchestra. He combined his duties at Cîntarea României with gestures that seemingly defied national-communist aesthetic guidelines, once appearing as a Western sheriff on posters that were widely circulated. He and Manolache gave occasional performances abroad, visiting East Germany and the People's Republic of Poland. They were also allowed into Israel, where they catered to the recently formed Romanian Jewish diaspora. They gained a cult following there, especially because they chose to imitate the interwar couple, "Stroe and Vasilache", with its hints of Jewish humor.

Jean's career was briefly endangered by a heart attack he suffered on 8 March 1988. During June 1989, he joined a selection of actors and singers that toured the Moldavian SSR (a Romanian-speaking portion of the Soviet Union). He reportedly enjoyed triumphs at Chișinău Republican Stadium and in Bender, where he performed musical duets with Gioni Dimitriu. August saw the premiere of a television series, Misiunea. Authored by Munteanu and directed by Virgil Calotescu, this production revived propaganda tropes, depicting communists as engaged in a struggle against old-regime figures; Jean himself had a "bad guy" cameo. In October, he and Bănică Sr. guest starred at an exhibition match between two women's football teams (Juventus and ICIM Brașov), held on Sibiu Municipal Stadium.

=== 1989 Revolution and transition years ===
Jean lived through the Romanian Revolution of December 1989, which ended communism. The change was signaled in television programing: on New Year's 1990, the national station, unable to come up with a new show, aired old sketches featuring Jean and his colleagues, but included segments that had previously banned by the censors. Jean was upset about the political and social changes, especially in terms of living costs. In his subsequent comedic monologues, he made his public laugh and think with lines such as: "Before, we used to eat yogurt and save money to buy a car. Now we sell our cars to afford the yogurt." The revamped Romanian Television, now styled TVR 1, changed its employment policies and, in August 1991, awarded Jean his own special, Cafeneaua actorilor, taped at Bucharest's Odobești Restaurant. The change of regimes came with a rapid decline in showbiz standards: in a 1993 interview, impresarios Alexandru Mihu and Anghel Stoian acknowledged that, in order to turn a profit, shows starring Jean also needed to feature about ten other performers. They took pride in noting that this formula had been successfully tried out as O floare și doi grădinari ("One Flower for Two Gardeners"), which had played to packed houses at both Sala Palatului and Arena Polivalentă.

In a 1996 interview, Jean expressed his disappointment at the "exceedingly vulgar humor" promoted by new comedy acts, and declared that the public must have grown tired of the political jokes that had taken over with the lifting of censorship. According to Badea, he was inconsistent: sometimes allowing himself to be drawn in by the new trends, which implied "aggressive licentiousness", he also issued firm protests against some samples of "obscene potboilers", successfully blocking them in his shows. For a while after the revolutionary events, Jean made noted appearances in sex comedies by Mureșan: Miss Litoral (1990) was panned by Căliman, but A doua cădere a Constantinopolului (1994) found his favor, and was a genuine hit with the general public. Film scholar Cătălin Olaru decries Miss Litoral as a semi-pornographic and sexist work, noting that the comedy relied on reaction shots, which showed Jean and Alexandru Arșinel aroused by the parade of nude or semi-nude beauty contestants. Mureșan engages in social commentary about Romania's capitalist transition by having Jean's character ("Nea Mielu") speak in a variety of Western languages and affiliate with comically-named political parties. In A doua cădere a Constantinopolului, the humor is carried by sexual misunderstandings, some of which involved Jean's character—again named "Ismail", in what amounted to a self-parody.

Jean also took roles in Drăgan's more conventional police procedural, Atac în bibliotecă, done in 1992 from a script by George Arion. The movie was panned by reviewer Călin Stănculescu, who noted that Jean's performance matched the overall feel by "carrying the imprint of perfect bad taste." Alongside Arșinel and Stela Popescu, Jean had by then formed a traveling team of actors, who performed at venues across Romania and were managed by the same impresarios. In March 1993, they allegedly blocked the accession younger comedians Doru Octavian Dumitru and Romică Țociu, the latter of whom complained that: "Jean Constantin simply refuses to even engage me in conversation. He resents me for my popularity." Jean had additionally begun touring outside of the country, with revue shows held for the Romanian diaspora in Israel, Germany, Italy, America, and the post-Soviet states. He was usually accompanied by Manolache, and often also by Popescu and Arșinel. The latter recalled that Jean "was extremely discreet, never speaking about his wants and sufferings". During his tours, a Dutch admirer awarded him a speedboat powered by a Mercury Marine engine, which he used for fishing trips on the Black Sea.

In March 1994, after having starred in their own show at Constantin Tănase Theater, Jean, Popescu and Arșinel drove themselves to Sweden, where they had been booked for four variety shows; here, they were reunited with self-exiled colleague, Vasilica Tastaman. By May, Jean had separated from Manolache, and had stabilized his trio with Popescu and Arșinel, using scripts by Popescu's husband, Puiu Maximilian. He was especially proud of their Dobrujan tours, noting that they had managed to perform with a full house despite conditions of "great poverty", and even as local cinemas were showing the nominally more attractive Indecent Proposal. He made occasional tours as a solo act: in June of that year, he and Gioni Dimitriu appeared at the Arad philharmonic alongside pop singers Mădălina Manole and Dan Spătaru—he was billed as "The Sultan", the show's main attraction alongside Manole. In September, he was at Craiova's Minerva Restaurant, performing alongside Maria Ciobanu and Florin Piersic at a Romani baptism.

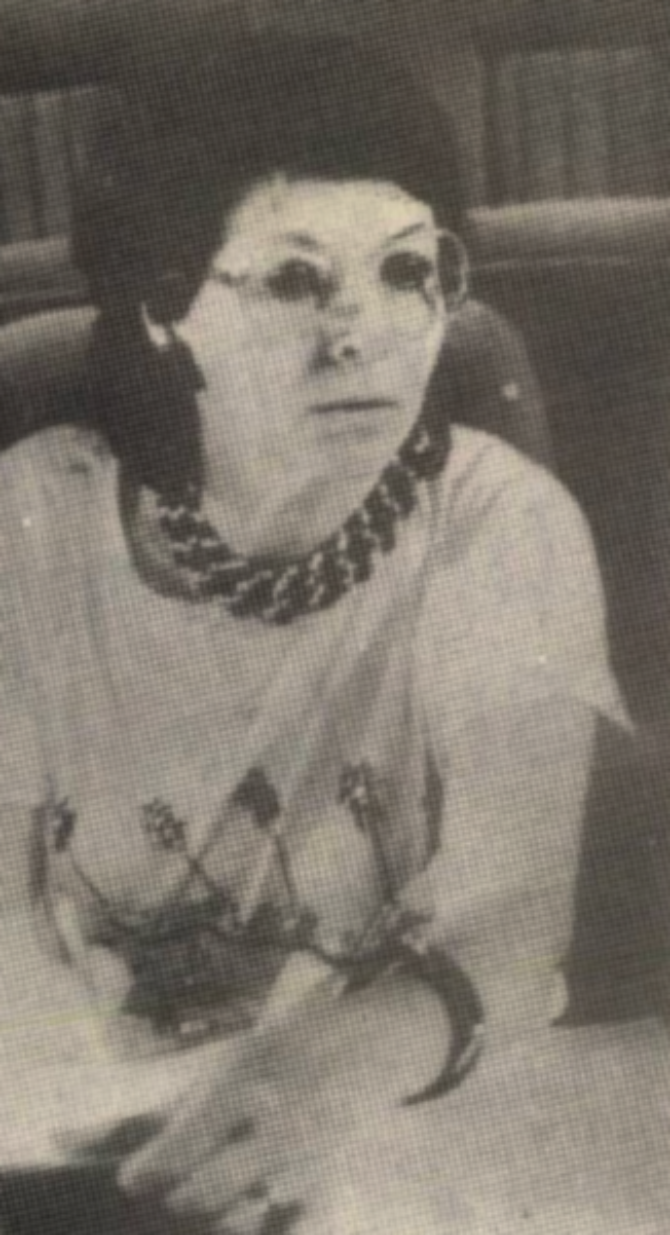
Jean's third wife, Nina, in 1988

Jean was still a regular at New Year's specials, as aired by TVR 1. In December 1995, he taped his own segment of the show, under I. C. Dalu's direction; this featured a monologue with his memories of old Constanța, as well as a segment introducing the young actress Oltița Chirilă. Around that time, he had reunited with Nicolaescu, starring as "Elvis" in the latter's Punctul zero of 1996 (a performance described as entirely forgettable by columnist Eugenia Vodă) and being promised a title role in a film project called Jean și fantomele. He appeared in televised vodka commercials, quoted or ridiculed for his catchphrase: Rămâne cum am stabilit ("It's just like we agreed"). His popularity was leading various impresarios to use his name on posters for shows that he did not participate in. During April 1996, he had agreed to do a show at Satu Mare, but was forced to cancel it after only 100 tickets were sold, allegedly because the public no longer trusted that he would really appear on stage. While performing at Augsburg in November of that year, he learned that his name was being fraudulently used to advertise a show at the Ploiești Philharmonic, and warned its impresarios that he was ready to sue. At Fantasio, Jean was acting as a mentor to several young women, helping them start their careers. In the mid-1990s, rumors spread that he was romantically engaged with the aspiring singer Silvia Chifiriuc. He denied such claims, explaining that the relationship was purely platonic; wishing to remain discreet about his private life, he only briefly discussed his marriage to Nina. She lived alone, in Jean's Bucharest apartment, for the remainder of his life. The couple was childless.

=== Old age ===
Again in high demand, Jean branched out as a recording artist, selling his own compact discs of music and jokes. Ahead of For New Year's Day 1997, he was preparing to film with TVR 1. His act was originally meant to feature a duet of lăutărească music, alongside the Romani performer Romica Puceanu. Her death in October put an end to the project. In the final version of the show, Jean performed in a sketch by Dan Mihăescu, showing him as a Lăutar, trying to please a former communist potentate turned businessman (who was played by Rădulescu). He picked 25 October 1997 as the 40h anniversary of his debut, and celebrated it with a show at Sala Palatului. Guest stars (among them Arșinel, Olteanu Matei and Rădulescu) appeared with masks on, and a 5-million-lei prize was offered to whoever correctly guessed their identities. His health was in decline, and in December 1997 he had to undergo emergency treatment for a second heart attack. He recovered swiftly, giving up smoking and almost entirely renouncing liquors, allowing him to perform as a nightclub act at the New Year's party in Baia Mare. Jean received further recognition in 1998, when he was granted the first-ever National Revue Prize by the association of musical theaters. In 1999, he was made an honorary citizen of Constanța.

In autumn 1999, TVR 1 commissioned Jean, who was in Chicago for the "Romanian Days" festival, for a satellite broadcast, aired within the Arca Marinei segment. He was also courted by Pro TV, initially as a special guest on its programs Ministerul Comediei and Super-Bingo. Jean signed with that privately owned station for New Year's 1999: with Papaiani, Olteanu Matei, Victor Rebengiuc and other old-school actors, he was a guest star in Florin Călinescu's Arca lui Nae special. He spent the first three months of 2000 touring across Western Europe. Ahead of the 2000 local elections, he appeared at a fundraiser for the Christian Democratic National Peasants' Party at Sala Palatului, invited there by candidate Vladimir Popescu, who was his personal friend. His act included a parody of the Democratic Party's anthem, Omul bun și pomul copt. Completed with lyrics about "old people that reek of death", it was poorly received by the Peasantist gerontocracy. He publicized the fact that his state pension was exceedingly small—set at a monthly 1.6 million lei (some 80 United States dollars), it required that he make frequent returns to the stage, in shows of declining quality. He stated his frustration that those in power had "voted themselves pensions set at several million", while he and others were braving poverty. In that context, he noted that one of his generation colleagues, Puiu Călinescu, "could no longer afford his own clothes" by the time of his death.

In late 2000, Jean signed with another broadcaster, Antena 1. For New Year's 2001, he secured a special there, guest starring Arșinel and Popescu. Together, they mocked the emerging trends in Romanian hip-hop and dance-pop, adding their own lyrics to music by Andreea Bălan, Genius, and Valahia. Resuming his work on the big screen, Jean appeared in another sex comedy, the 2001 Sexy Harem Ada-Kaleh (directed by Mureșan as a "sequel of sorts" to A doua cădere). As Ismail, he was reunited with his illegitimate son, played by Ștefan Bănică Jr. The resulting film, described by Mureșan himself as catering to the moviegoers' evolving tastes, is regarded by critics as a low point in Jean's career. Jean was still well regarded for his work in the revue genre, with a Lifetime Achievement Award presented to him by the association of theater professionals (UNITER) in April 2003. In addition to being "obstinate in protecting his private life", he came to object to the increasingly sexualized content of TV shows. In June 2005, he refused to appear as a guest for Antena 1's Genialii, since it would have required him to discuss his colleagues' private lives. Reportedly, he feigned an illness so that he could refuse politely.

In 2006, Constanța State Theater commissioned Beatrice Rancea to direct the musical Șatra, based on Romani-themed stories by Maxim Gorky. Jean appeared in the production as a "special guest". Also then, he had a celebrated dramatic role in Cătălin Mitulescu's feature film, The Way I Spent the End of the World. While Romanian critics were impressed, he himself played down the performance, arguing that: "I only did what was asked of me as an actor, and that's it." Mitulescu was the only "Romanian New Wave" filmmaker to take an interest in Jean's work, and also one of the few directors not to cast him as an ethnic minority. In 2007, Jean starred in ROMing, described by critics of the day as his final significant film role. He filmed on location in the Czech Republic, but could not attend the October premiere, due to a leg injury. Around that time, he was also inducted into the Knights of Malta. In February 2008, aged 79, he received the Gopo Lifetime Achievement Award.

Against his wife's advice, Jean continued to act throughout his final years, never disclosing to the public that his health was failing. He revived his role as Limbă in the 2008 action film, Supraviețuitorul, which, Căliman notes, heavily relied on the public's nostalgia. In June 2009, he was hospitalized for another documented heart attack, but released from care before the end of the month. Late that year, he was filming for Nicolaescu's Poker, as "Agârbiceanu", head of the Romanian mafia. In early 2010, Jean traveled for diaspora shows in Vancouver. Singer Benone Sinulescu, who worked alongside him, claims that Jean went through another visible health crisis, bordering on a heart attack, at the start of his return trip. According to Sinulescu, he had failed to report his pacemaker before going through the millimeter wave scanner at Vancouver International Airport. In May, Jean suffered a fourth heart attack, for which he was treated at Bucharest's Fundeni Hospital. Asking to be released, he gave his final performance in front of his fellow Dobrujans, at Adamclisi. He then died in his residence on Constanța's Ferdinand Boulevard on 26 May; his body was discovered by the laïko singer Ionuț Galani, who had been his close friend.

== Legacy ==
The body was laid in state at Fantasio. Jean was buried on 28 May at the city's central cemetery, after a religious service at the Cathedral of Saints Peter and Paul. The ceremonies were attended by "hundreds of people", ranging from regular folk to recognized actors; among the latter was a visibly distraught Arșinel. The Ministry of Culture issued a communique, describing the deceased as "an entirely special artist" and "a cultural symbol that was indisputably positive for Romanian society as a whole." Fantasio was renamed in Jean's honor, and a bust of the actor was erected in front of it.

Brigada Diverse and various other films that include communist tropes in their core narrative, endured as popular and syndicated television reruns, into the 2010s. According to historian Adrian Cioroianu, such appeal does not attest to communist nostalgia in any political sense, but rather shows an agining public wishing to relieve its youth. A "Jean Constantin Youth Center" was in the process of being built by Constanța city hall in 2019. His boat was inherited and restored by Galani. The latter had also joined Nina Jean in handling regular Orthodox memorial services for her husband.

== Filmography ==
- Poker (2010)
- Vine poliția! (2008)
- Supraviețuitorul (2008)
- Regina (2008)
- Inimă de țigan (2007)
- ROMing (2007)
- Păcală se întoarce (2006)
- The Way I Spent the End of the World (2006)
- La urgență (2006)
- Meseriașii (2006)
- Ultimul stinge lumina (2004)
- Sexy Harem Ada-Kaleh (2001)
- Punctul zero (1996)
- A doua cădere a Constantinopolului (1994)
- Atac în bibliotecă (1992)
- Miss Litoral (1990)
- Secretul lui Nemesis (1988)
- Chirița la Iași (1987)
- În fiecare zi mi-e dor de tine (1987)
- Coana Chirița (1986)
- Colierul de turcoaze (1985)
- The Silver Mask (1985)
- Sosesc păsările călătoare (1984)
- The Secret of Bacchus (1984)
- Un petic de cer (1984)
- Misterele Bucureștilor (1983)
- Am o idee! (1981)
- Capcana mercenarilor (1981)
- Duelul (1981)
- Un echipaj pentru Singapore (1981)
- Iancu Jianu, haiducul (1981)
- The Oil, the Baby and the Transylvanians (1981)
- Al treilea salt mortal (1980)
- Omul care ne trebuie (1979)
- Uncle Marin, the Billionaire (1979)
- Brațele Afroditei (1978)
- Expresul de Buftea (1978)
- Melodii, melodii (1978)
- Revanșa (1978)
- Totul pentru fotbal (1978)
- Acțiunea Autobuzul (1977)
- Eu, tu și Ovidiu (1977)
- Împușcături sub clar de lună (1977)
- Oil! (1977)
- Bunicul și doi delicvenți minori (1976)
- Gloria nu cîntă (1976)
- Toate pînzele sus (1976)
- Zile fierbinți (1976)
- Evadarea (1975)
- Mastodontul (1975)
- Nemuritorii (1974)
- Nu filmăm să ne amuzăm (1974)
- Frații Jderi (1974)
- Stejar, extremă urgență (1974)
- Ultimul cartuș (1973)
- Explosion (1973)
- A Police Superintendent Accuses (1973)
- Adio, dragă Nela! (1972; released 1990)
- Felix and Otilia (1972)
- B.D. la munte și la mare (1971)
- Brigada Diverse în alertă! (1970)
- B.D. intră în acțiune (1970)
- Haiducii lui Șaptecai (1970)
- Zestrea domniței Ralu (1970)
- Canarul și viscolul (1969)
- Prea mic pentru un război atît de mare (1969)
- Răzbunarea haiducilor (1968)
- Zile de vară (1968)
- Maiorul și moartea (1967)
- Zodia Fecioarei (1967)
- Procesul alb (1965)

== Sources ==
- Jean Badea, Omul care aduce... hazul. Constanța: Leda & Muntenia, 2000. ISBN 973-9286-60-7
- Cătălin Olaru, "1990–1994. Primul cincinal de comedie română liberă", in Andrei Gorzo, Gabriela Filippi (eds.) Filmul tranziției. Contribuții la interpretarea cinemaului românesc 'nouăzecist', pp. 295–312. Cluj-Napoca: Tact, 2017. ISBN 978-606-8437-89-7
- Roxana Pană, "În exclusivitate. Cine nu rîde la... Jean Constantin?", in Almanah Cinema, 1983, pp. 137–140.
