= Românești =

Românești or Romanești may refer to several places in Romania:

- Românești, Botoșani, a commune in Botoșani County
- Românești, Iași, a commune in Iași County
- Românești, a village in Berești-Tazlău Commune, Bacău County
- Românești, a village in Potlogi Commune, Dâmbovița County
- Românești, a village in Șimnicu de Sus Commune, Dolj County
- Românești, a village administered by Târgu Jiu city, Gorj County
- Românești, a village in Boiu Mare Commune, Maramureș County
- Românești, a village in Bărcănești Commune, Prahova County
- Românești, a village in Medieșu Aurit Commune, Satu Mare County
- Romanești, a village in Blăjel Commune, Sibiu County
- Românești, a village in Coșna Commune, Suceava County
- Românești, a village in Grănicești Commune, Suceava County
- Românești, a village in Tomești Commune, Timiș County
  - Românești Cave, a cave in this village
- Romanești, a village in Roșiile Commune, Vâlcea County
- Românești, a village in Nistorești Commune, Vrancea County
- Românești (river), a tributary of the Valea Neagră in Neamț County
