= Romanesti =

Romanesti may refer to:

- Româneşti (disambiguation), several places in Romania
- Romaneşti, a village in Roșiile Commune, Vâlcea County, Romania
- Romăneşti, a commune in Străşeni district, Moldova
