= Songs of the Sea (1970 film) =

- Directed by: Francisc Munteanu
- Written by: Boris Laskin; Francisc Munteanu
- Starring: Dan Spătaru; Natalya Fateyeva
- Cinematography: Aleksandr Shelenkov; Yu-Lan Chen
- Music by: Temistocle Popa; Mark Fradkin
- Production company: Mosfilm
- Release date: 1970
- Running time: 86 minutes
- Countries: Soviet Union; Romania
- Languages: Romanian; Russian

Songs of the Sea (Romanian: Cîntecele mării) is a 1970 Soviet-Romanian musical film directed by Francisc Munteanu.

The soundtrack by Themistocle Popa to the film became popular in the USSR and in 1971 it was released as a record containing 4 songs from the film (Melodiya, D 00030081-2).

The film was a USSR box-office leader in 1971 where it took 8th place, with 36.7 million viewers.

== Plot ==
An amateur musical group of Romanian students from the city of Constanța is going to get to the Sochi festival, but they do not know the text of the compulsory song. Meanwhile, the text of the compulsory song wanders around the country due to the fact that it was stolen by a certain person from one Moscow archive. Soon, Nina Denisova (Natalya Fateyeva), representative of the Sochi festival, arrives in that city (in Constanta), where the ensemble is headed by student Mihai (Dan Spătaru). Nina is fond for Mihai. On a train ride to Bucharest, Mihai recognizes the melody of the compulsory song, by overhearing violinist-bandits at the signal of Nina, memorizes it and conducted it for his team. The jury unanimously decides to nominate this student group for the festival in Sochi. Before the trip to Sochi, Mihai and Nina have a temporary quarrel over Sylvia, one of the participants of the ensemble. On the ship all the heroes are sent to Sochi, where the festival is to be held.

== Cast ==
- Dan Spătaru — Mihai
- Natalya Fateyeva — Nina Denisova
- Ion Dichiseanu — gangster Ganea
- Ioana Atanasiu
- Ștefan Bănică — Mitache
- Emil Hossu
- Dumitru Chesa - Spirache
- Mircea Constantinescu
- Mirela Ghițescu
- Valentina Kutsenko — secretary, who counts votes in the commission
- Réka Nagy
- Peter Paulhoffer
- Marina Lobysheva
- Lyudmila Smaragdova
