= Leontina Vaduva =

Romanian soprano (born 1960)

Leontina Văduva (born 1 December 1960) is a Romanian soprano. Born in Roșiile, she studied at the Bucharest Conservatory with Ileana Cotrubaș, and debuted in the title role of Manon at Toulouse in 1987. A recipient of the Laurence Olivier Opera Award, she has often appeared at Covent Garden, in Rigoletto (opposite Ingvar Wixell and Jerry Hadley, 1989), Carmen (as Micaëla, 1991 and 1994), and Roméo et Juliette (1994). Leontina Vaduva is the daughter of the Romanian popular music singer Maria Ciobanu.

In 2000, Vaduva appeared at the Metropolitan Opera, in six performances of La bohème (as Mimì, with Luis Lima). The soprano has also sung with the companies of Buenos Aires, Barcelona, Chicago, Cologne, Vienna, and Paris.

Her discography includes Rigoletto (1993), Les contes d'Hoffmann (as Antonia, with Roberto Alagna, conducted by Kent Nagano, 1994–96), La bohème (again with Alagna, led by Sir Antonio Pappano, 1995), and an album of "Opera Arias," conducted by Plácido Domingo (1997). Especially noteworthy is her DVD of Roméo et Juliette, with Alagna, conducted by Sir Charles Mackerras and directed by Nicolas Joël (1994).
