= Muzică populară =

Modern popular folk music of Romania

In Romania, the syntagm muzică populară (English: popular/folk music) is used to denote a musical genre based on folklore, but distinct from it. The distinction is both in form and essence and it arises mainly from the commercial aspect of the popular music. In English the term is ambiguous since it could also refer to Romanian pop music.

== Meaning of the term ==
The Romanian term "muzică populară" has been used with different meanings. In the 1930s, for example, in the writings of Constantin Brăiloiu, it refers to Romanian folk music as the music of Romanian peasants. Later the term acquired a new meaning: since the 1950s it has been used in opposition to "proper" folk music to exclusively describe the more commercially produced music reminiscent of folk music.

== Origins ==
The popular music originated at the beginning of the 20th century when the first recordings were made. Traditional songs were collected and were adapted so they would have more appeal to the general public. Original compositions with motifs inspired by the traditional music (both peasant and lăutărească music) also started to appear. Some of the most important singers of popular music from this period are Maria Tănase and Maria Lătărețu.

== Involvement of the communist regime ==
An important development in the popular music happened with the arrival of the communist regime, that took an interest in the popular music (for its tie with the masses) and imposed its own aesthetics. The music become standardized with short and simple structures as opposed to the longer and more irregular song structures that frequently occur in the traditional music. Improvisation, that plays an important part in both the peasant and the lăutărească music, was completely left out. The performers were required to have formal musical studies and were required to sing and play in a "nice and easy" manner in contrast to the coarser styles found in traditional musics. The regime promoted its own palette of "popular stars", while authentic performers of traditional musics were totally ignored (except a very few that were able to adapt to the new requirements).

One of the most important changes done by the communist regime was the creation of large popular ensembles. This current started in the Soviet Union and spread in all the countries of the communist bloc, as it was seen as a "superior way of rendering the folklore".

Some of the most important artists of this era are Ion Dolănescu, Maria Ciobanu, Irina Loghin, Sofia Vicoveanca, Nicolae Furdui Iancu and instrumentalists like Gheorghe Zamfir, Dumitru Fărcaș and Dumitru Zamfira. Some of the most important ensembles were the national "Ciocârlia" ensemble, the "Barbu Lăutaru" ensemble of the State Philharmonic, the "Doina" ensemble of the Romanian Army, etc. Most of this ensembles disband after the fall of the communist regime or reduced their personnel. Today, the most famous orchestras are the "Lăutarii" ensemble (based in Moldova) and a so-called "National Orchestra for Folklore" ("Orchestra Naţională de Folclor").

== See also ==
- Romanian traditional music
- Fakelore
- Music of Romania
- Folklore of Romania
- Lăutari
- Lăutărească music
