= The Secret of Bacchus =

- Directed by: Geo Saizescu
- Starring: Emil Hossu; Ștefan Mihăilescu-Brăila
- Music by: Temistocle Popa
- Release date: 5 March 1984
- Running time: 2h
- Country: Romania
- Language: Romanian

The Secret of Bacchus (Romanian: Secretul lui Bachus) is a 1984 Romanian comedy film directed by Geo Saizescu.

== Cast ==
- Emil Hossu - Mirea
- Ștefan Mihăilescu-Brăila - Bachus
- Dem Rădulescu - Sterea
- Gheorghe Dinică - Cercel
- Sebastian Papaiani - Grig Stevie
- Jean Constantin - Bulbuc
- Rodica Mureșan - Pica Barbu
- Octavian Cotescu - Vladimir Cocea
