= Cu mâinile curate =

1972 film

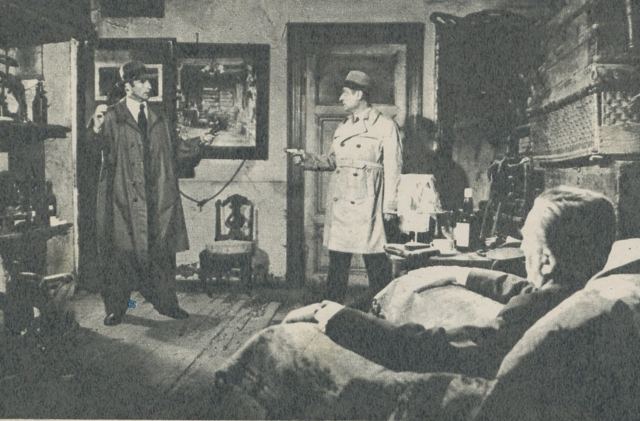
- Scene from film
- Directed by: Sergiu Nicolaescu
- Written by: Titus Popovici; Petre Sălcudeanu
- Starring: Ilarion Ciobanu; Sergiu Nicolaescu; Alexandru Dobrescu; Gheorghe Dinică
- Cinematography: Alexandru David
- Release date: 1972
- Running time: 95 minutes
- Country: Romania
- Language: Romanian

Cu mâinile curate (With Clean Hands) is a 1972 Romanian crime thriller film directed by and starring Sergiu Nicolaescu.

== Plot ==
Set in post war Romania, Roman Mihai, a communist who was tortured by the fascists during the war, is now a police detective determined to rid his city of gangsters and black marketeers. Commissioner Roman is introduced as a rookie detective.

== Cast ==
- Nita Anastase as Alexe
- Ion Apahideanu as policeman
- Sergiu Nicolaescu as Commissioner Tudor Miclovan
- Corina Chiriac as singer
- Ilarion Ciobanu as Mihai Roman
- George Constantin as Semaca
- Stelian Cremenciuc as Scorțea's man
- Gheorghe Dinică as Lăscărică
- Alexandru Dobrescu as Ștefan Patulea
- Dorin Dron as Puiu Scorțea
- Jean Lorin Florescu as Bleoarcä
- Monica Ghiuță as Mrs. Patulea
- Corneliu Gîrbea as Burdujel
- Aimée Iacobescu as Charlotte
- Sebastian Papaiani as Fane Oarcă
- Ștefan Mihăilescu-Brăila as Buciurligă
- Emanoil Petruț as Niculae Popa
- Mihai Mereuță as Șchiopu
- Alexandru D. Lungu as guard
- Adrian Ștefănescu as Semaca's man
