= Capcana mercenarilor =

- Directed by: Sergiu Nicolaescu
- Written by: Sergiu Nicolaescu; Liviu Gheorghiu
- Produced by: Georgeta Vîlcu; Gerrit List; Lidia Popiță Mohor
- Starring: Gheorghe Cozorici; Mircea Albulescu; Ion Besoiu; Amza Pellea; Jean Constantin; Colea Răutu; George Mihăiță; Violeta Andrei
- Cinematography: Nicolae Girardi
- Edited by: Gabriela Nasta; Anca Dobrescu
- Music by: Ileana Popovici
- Production companies: Casa de Filme 5 DEFA Berlin
- Distributed by: Româniafilm
- Release date: January 26, 1981 (Romania)
- Running time: 108 minutes
- Countries: Romania; East Germany
- Language: Romanian

Mercenaries' Trap (Romanian: Capcana mercenarilor) is a 1981 Romanian adventure drama war film, directed by Sergiu Nicolaescu. The movie is set in Transylvania towards the end of World War I.

== Cast ==
- Gheorghe Cozorici – baron colonel von Görtz
- Sergiu Nicolaescu – major Tudor Andrei
- Mircea Albulescu – captain Luca
- Ion Besoiu – captain Lemeni
- Amza Pellea – mercenary Frank
- Jean Constantin – Hans
- Colea Răutu – cavalry sergeant Ion Ailenei
- Corneliu Gârbea – Genovese mercenary
- Klaus Gehrke – mercenary
- Șerban Ionescu – Mitru, Luca's brother
- Traian Costea – lieutenant Dumitru Ionescu
- Constantin Rauțchi – toothless mercenary
- Constantin Codrescu – director of the poker club
- Mircea Gogan – Wilhelm
- George Mihăiță – Onuț, Luca's brother
- Violeta Andrei – countess Esther, wife of baron von Görtz
- Ileana Popovici – young peasant woman
- Enikõ Szilágyi – lover of the poker club's director
- Ion Anestin
- Ion Marinescu –priest
- Ion Pascu
- Alexandru Rioșanu
- Vasile Popa
- Ion Pall
- Dumitru Crăciun
- Adrian Ștefănescu
- Mihai Adrian
- Doru Dumitrescu
- Ion Polizache
- Alexandru Dobrescu – Romanian colonel
- Vasile Boghiță
