= ROMing =

Roming
- Directed by: Jiří Vejdělek
- Written by: Marek Epstein
- Produced by: Rudolf Biermann; Andrei Boncea; Tomás Hoffman; Mișu Predescu
- Cinematography: Jakub Simunek
- Edited by: Jan Danhel
- Release date: 2007
- Running time: 120 minutes
- Country: Czech Republic
- Language: Czech
- Budget: CZK 28,000,000 (estimated)

ROMing is a Czech comedy film, released in 2007. It's a road movie centered on the Roma (Gypsies), but with an extra story within the story.

== Cast ==
- Bolek Polívka - Stano Zaječí
- Marián Labuda - Roman
- Vítezslav Holub - Jura
- Jean Constantin - Somáli
- Corina Moise - Bebetka
- Vladimír Javorský - the postman, the devil, God
- Florentina Emanoil - Somáliová
- Oldřich Vlach - the priest
- Eva Leinweberová - clerk
- Jaromír Nosek - policeman
- Miroslav Hanuš - policeman
- Milan Senki as Mihajli's Son
- Robert Senki as Mihajli's Son
- Jan Surmaj as Mihajli's Son
- Petr Surmaj as Mihajli's Son
- Jan Pulo as Mihajli's Son
- Viliam Conka as Scuka
- Berta Cervenáková as Scuková
- Hana Kovaríková as Verunka
- Emilya Gulyevová as Ivetka
- David Sir as Altar boy
- Jitka Jezková
- Jitka Moučková as Bebetka (voice)
- Jirí Plachý
- Saša Rašilov
