= Jitka Moučková =

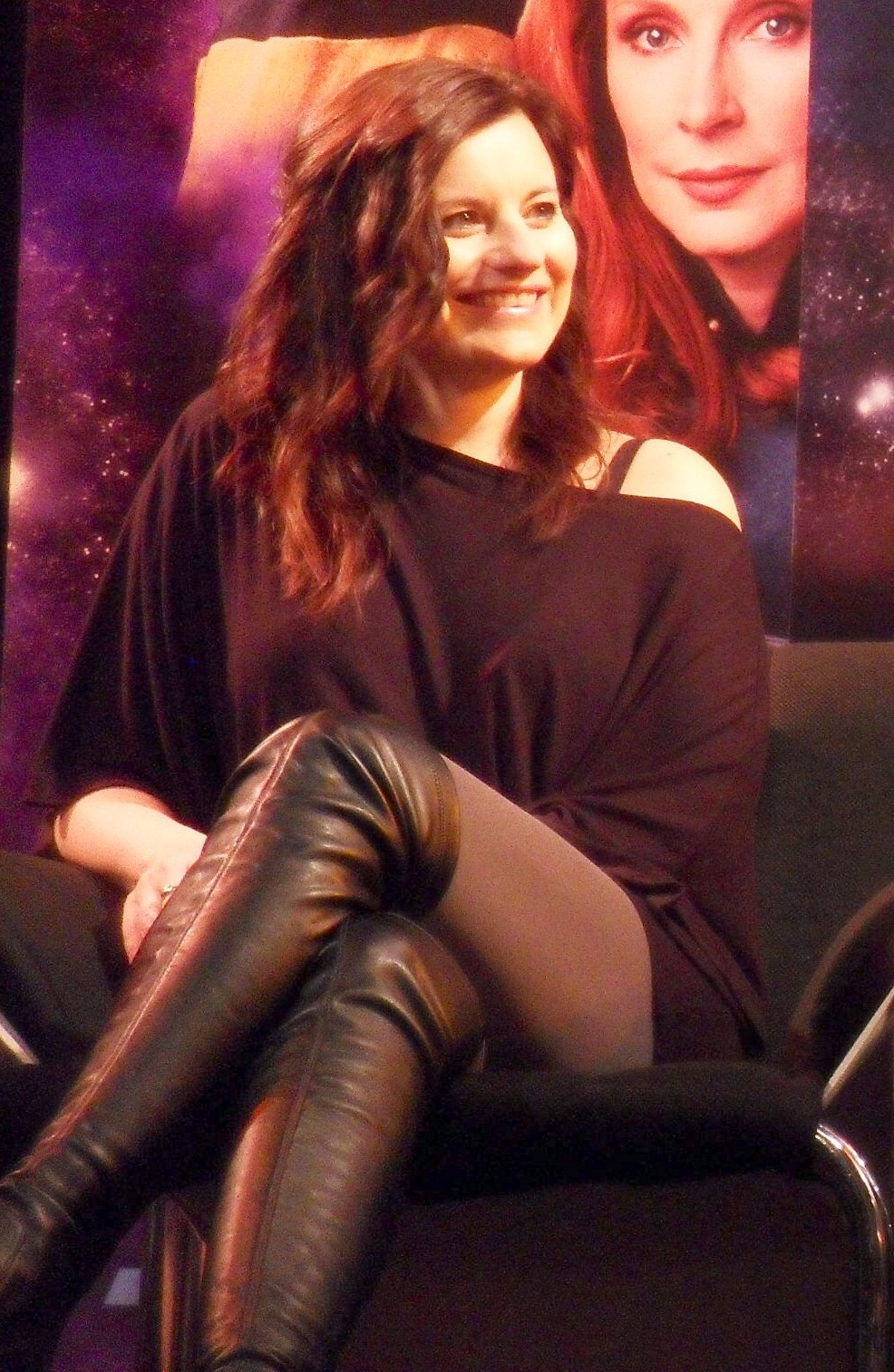
- Born: 6 July 1979 (age 47); Kladno, Czechoslovakia
- Occupation: Actress
- Years active: 1997-present

Jitka Moučková (born 6 July 1979) is a Czech actress and dubbing artist. She has played parts at the Musical Theatre Karlín and the National Theatre in Prague. Among other roles, she has dubbed Penny in The Big Bang Theory for Czech television audiences.

== Selected filmography ==
- ROMing (2007)
- The Devil's Bride (2011)
- Lída Baarová (2016)
