= Corina Chiriac =

Romanian singer and actress

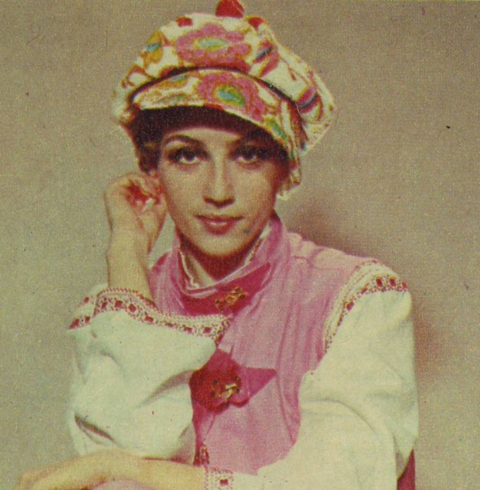
- Born: 26 October 1949 (age 76); Bucharest, Romania
- Occupations: Singer; Actress
- Years active: 1970–present

Corina Chiriac (born 26 October 1949) is a Romanian singer, composer, lyricist, television director and actress. She was one of the most successful Romanian singers of the 1970s and 1980s. In 2004 she received the Romanian Order of Cultural Merit.

== Life ==
Chiriac was born on 26 October 1949. She is the daughter of Romanian composer Mircea Chiriac (1919–1994), and her mother was a pianist. She graduated from the National Theatre Institute in 1972. Chiriac is a singer, composer, lyricist, television director and actress, and was one of the most successful Romanian singers of the 1970s and 1980s.

So far Chiriac has recorded over 500 songs and performed in many Romanian TV variety shows. She toured Eastern Europe extensively during the 70s and early 80s (the former East Germany, Russia, Bulgaria, Poland, the former Czechoslovakia etc.).

Between 1988 and 1994 she lived in the US. She received an offer from Walt Disney Pictures, and provided the voice of Ursula in 1994, 2005 and Morgana in 2010 for the Romanian version of the film, The Little Mermaid and The Little Mermaid 2.

In 2024 an exhibition about Chiriac was held at Palace of Culture in Iași, titled Corina Chiriac, istoriile unei mari artiste (Corina Chiriac, stories of a great artist) as part of the Romanian Film Evenings (SFR) Festival. The exhibition was a joint project between the National History Museum of Moldova and the National History Museum of Romania, and ran from 31 July until 13 October.

In 2004 Chiriac was awarded the Order of Cultural Merit in the rank of Knight, in Category B – "Music", “for her outstanding contributions to the artistic and cultural activity in our country, for the promotion of Romanian civilization and history”.

== Filmography ==
Year	Title	Role	Notes
1972	Cu mâinile curate	Singer	
1972	Aventuri la Marea Neagră	Barbara	Main role
1976	Roșcovanul	Suzi	
1994/2005	The Little Mermaid	Ursula (Dubbing)	
