= Ștefan Bănică =

Ștefan Bănică may refer to:

- Ștefan Bănică Sr. (1933–1995), Romanian singer and actor
- Ștefan Bănică Jr. (born 1967), his son, who is also a singer and actor
