= Nemuritorii =

The Immortals
- Directed by: Sergiu Nicolaescu
- Written by: Sergiu Nicolaescu
- Starring: Ion Besoiu; Ilarion Ciobanu; Jean Constantin; Gheorghe Dinică; Sergiu Nicolaescu; Costel Băloiu; Gina Patrichi; Amza Pellea
- Cinematography: Alexandru David
- Music by: Tiberiu Olah
- Release date: 1974
- Running time: 103 minutes
- Country: Romania
- Language: Romanian

Nemuritorii (The Immortals) is a 1974 Romanian historical-adventure film. This film was directed by Romanian director Sergiu Nicolaescu. It was released on 22 January 1974 in Romania.

== Cast ==
- Ion Besoiu as Costea
- Ilarion Ciobanu as Vasile
- Sergiu Nicolaescu as Captain Andrei
- Gheorghe Dinică as The Noble Man Butnaru
- Costel Băloiu as Mihăiță
- Gina Patrichi as Johanna
- Amza Pellea as Dumitru
- Colea Răutu as Iusuf Pașa
- Zephi Alșec as Earl Sarosi
- Dumitru Crăciun as Crăciun
- Alexandru Dobrescu as Mohor
- Mircea Pașcu as Paraschiv
- Vasile Popa as One 'Nemuritor' (Immortal)
- Heidemarie Wenzel as Maria-Christina
- Jean Constantin

== See also ==
- List of historical drama films
