= Ciucur-Mingir =

- Village
- Location in Moldova
- Coordinates: 46°26′27″N 28°45′21″E
- Country: Moldova
- District: Cimișlia District

Population (2014 census)
  - Total: 1,419
- Time zone: UTC+2 (EET)
  - Summer (DST): UTC+3 (EEST)

Ciucur-Mingir is a village in Cimișlia District, Moldova.

== Notable people ==
- Nicolae Cernov
- Ilarion Ciobanu
