= Emil Hossu =

Romanian actor (1941–2012)

- Born: Emil Vasilie Hossu; 24 November 1941; Ocna Sibiului, Sibiu County, Kingdom of Romania
- Died: 25 January 2012 (aged 70); Bucharest, Romania
- Resting place: Bellu Cemetery, Bucharest
- Education: Institute of Theatre and Film Arts
- Occupations: Film and theatre actor
- Spouse: Anca Hossu (divorced) Catrinel Dumitrescu (m. 1992)
- Children: Dan Hossu
- Awards: National Order of Faithful Service, Knight rank

Emil Hossu (Romanian pronunciation: [eˈmil ˈhosu]; 24 November 1941 – 25 January 2012) was a Romanian actor.

== Biography ==
Hossu was born into a Greek-Catholic family in Ocna Sibiului, Sibiu County and grew up in Cluj. Since his father was a diplomat during the time of Ion Antonescu, his whole family was deported on August 23, 1945 to a camp in Germany; after a year and three months, they escaped and returned to Romania. In 1948, his father was sent by the Communist authorities to forced labor at the Danube–Black Sea Canal, from where he returned after 6 months, only to die from cancer.

After completing Cantemir Vodă High School in Bucharest, Hossu studied at the Institute of Theatre and Film Arts, which he graduated in 1965. With his first wife, violinist Anca Hossu, he had a son, Dan. He was a well-known actor of stage and screen in the 1980s and 1990s, having performed in over 50 movies and stage productions. In 2002, he was awarded the National Order of Faithful Service, Knight rank.

At the time of his death, on 25 January 2012, he was performing at the Nottara Theatre in Bucharest alongside his wife of 20 years, the actress Catrinel Dumitrescu. Hossu died of a cardiac arrest, just as he was about to go on stage in a play called The Anniversary. He is interred at Bellu Cemetery in Bucharest.

== Selected filmography ==
- La datorie (1968)
- Simpaticul domn R (1969) – Mihai
- Songs of the Sea (1970) – Pavel
- Aventurile lui Babușcă (1973) – Lt. Marinică
- Toamna bobocilor (1975) – Dr. Ovidiu Ghiculescu
- Accident (1976) – Lt. Nistor
- Iarna bobocilor (1977) – Dr. Ovidiu Ghiculescu
- Totul pentru fotbal (1978) – Dobre
- Avaria (1979) – Ducu
- Bună seara, Irina! (1980) – Mircea Caropol
- La răscrucea marilor furtuni (1980) – Delvos
- Guillaume le conquérant (1982) – A Norman knight
- The Secret of Bacchus (1984) – Victor Mirea
- Zbor periculos (1984) – A plane pilot
- Sosesc păsările călătoare (1985) – Radu Cojar
- Vară sentimentală (1986) – Bogdan Mihai
- The Last Assault (1986) – Soldier Munteanu
- Secretul lui Nemesis (1987) – Victor Mirea
- Totul se plătește (1987) – La Peyrolle
- Cale liberă (1987) – Alexandru Truică
- Să-ți vorbesc despre mine (1988) – Horia Mihail
- Un studio în căutarea unei vedete (1989) – The movie director
- Harababura (1991) – The hotel manager
- The Earth's Most Beloved Son (1993) – Iustin Comănescu
- Liceenii în alertă (1993) – Major "Sherlock Holmes"
- Oglinda (1993) – Col. Emilian Ionescu
- Point Zero (1996) – Andrei Kemenici
- Une mère comme on n'en fait plus (1997) – Striker
- Triunghiul morții (1993) – Gen. Eremia Grigorescu
- Om sărac, om bogat (2006) – Mircea Prodan
- Chiquititas (2007) – Victor Mărăscu
- Inimă de țigan (2008) – Titel
- Fetele Marinarului (2009) – Don Juan
- Ho Ho Ho (2009) – Ion's father
- Iubire și onoare (2010–2011) – Titus
