= Ion Dolănescu =

Romanian singer and politician

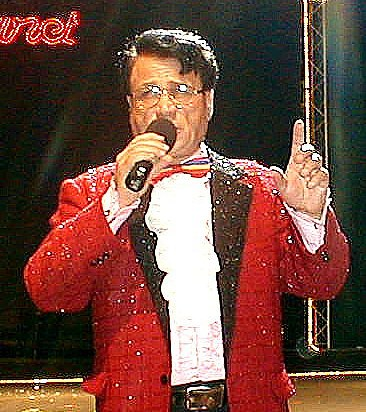

Background information
- Born: 25 January 1944; Perșinari, Dâmbovița County, Kingdom of Romania
- Died: 19 March 2009 (aged 65) Bucharest, Romania
- Occupations: Singer, politician
- Instrument: Vocals
- Years active: until 2009

Member of the Chamber of Deputies of Romania
- In office 2000–2004

Personal details
- Resting place: Bellu Cemetery, Bucharest
- Party: Greater Romania Party
- Spouse: Maria Ciobanu

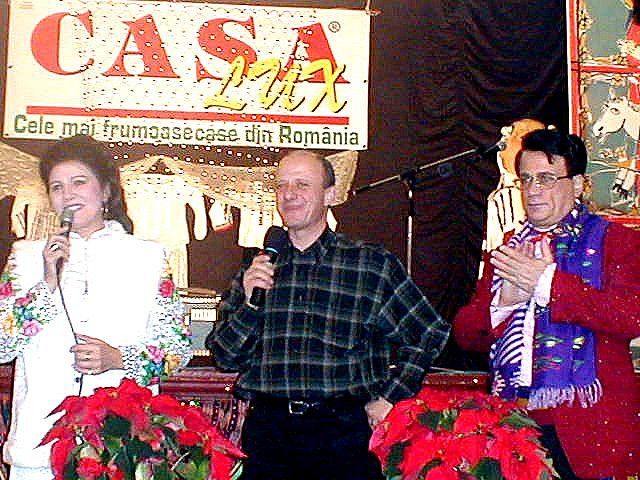
Dolănescu (right) with Irina Loghin and Mihai Mălaimare

Ion Dolănescu (Romanian pronunciation: [iˈon doləˈnesku]; 25 January 1944 – 19 March 2009) was a Romanian singer of folk music and a politician.

He was married to singer Maria Ciobanu. He was a member of the Greater Romania Party and was elected to the Chamber of Deputies from 2000 to 2004.

== Songs ==
- M-am născut printre Carpați
- Gorjule, grădină dulce
- De când sunt pe-acest pământ
- Mândro, când ne iubeam noi
- Să-mi trăiască nevestica
- Neuitata mea, Maria
- Au, lele, vino-ncoa (with Maria Ciobanu)
- Face-m-aș privighetoare (with Maria Ciobanu)
- Pe sub dealul cu izvorul (with Maria Ciobanu)
- Pe sub creanga vișinie
- Tare-i dulce porcul de Crăciun (with Vali Vijelie)
- Mare ți-e grădina Doamne, iar eu din ea fac parte!
- Hora de zambalagii
- Și-am murit și am trait
- Cu paharu' nu-ți mai trece doru
- Iarna nu-i ca vara
