= Commissioner Roman =

Commissioner Michael Roman (Romanian: 'Comisarul Mihai Roman') is a fictional police detective in a series of five Romanian thriller films. Ilarion Ciobanu played Commissioner Roman in all five films, and Sergiu Nicolaescu directed the first two. The films were:

- With Clean Hands (Romanian: Cu mâinile curate), 1972
- The Last Bullet (Romanian: Ultimul cartuş), 1973
- Conspiracy (Romanian: Conspiraţia), 1973
- Long Way to Tipperary (Romanian: Departe de Tipperary), 1973
- Trap (Romanian: Capcana), 1974

Making a thriller that resembled the American ones that I saw from 1936 to 1942 seemed an unattainable dream under communism. However, a script written by Peter Salcudeanu and Titus Popovici in 1971 put me in mind of two American actors - James Cagny and Humphrey Bogart - and the gangster movies of my youth...

— Sergiu Nicolaescu

The first film of the series, With Clean Hands takes place in 1945-1946 and introduces Mihai Roman as a rookie detective. Roman is a dedicated communist and former member of the communist underground, and his joining the force is part of the communist infiltration of the government apparatus (which is presented positively). The earnest, by-the-book Roman teams with the more unorthodox (and apolitical) Tudor Miclovan (played by Sergiu Nicolaescu himself) to clean up organized crime in post-war Bucharest. Miclovan is killed at the end ("It's nothing... I'm finished, but Romania continues...").

In the next film in the series, The Last Bullet, Roman hunts downs Miclovan's killer, a local gangster and smuggler named Semaca. Roman carries Miclovan's last cartridge in his pocket, hence the movie's title. Roman also catches a German spy who is still hiding in Romania.

Audience demand for a revival of Miclovan was refused by screenwriter Titus Popovici, which led to strained relations between Popovici and director Nicolaescu. The next three films in the series were directed by Manole Marcus.

In Conspiracy, Roman thwarts election fraud. Long Way to Tipperary is based on the historical Tămădău Affair; Roman tracks traitors plotting to flee the country to set up a government in exile, and arrests them at the airport.

In Trap, the final film of the series, Roman deals with remnants of the Iron Guard entrenched in the Carpathian Mountains. In this film, Roman is seriously wounded but does not die. The film shows details of Orthodox monastic life, as the gang poses as monks. This film was shown in the Soviet Union.
