= Dan Spătaru =

Romanian singer (1939–2004)

Dan George Spătaru
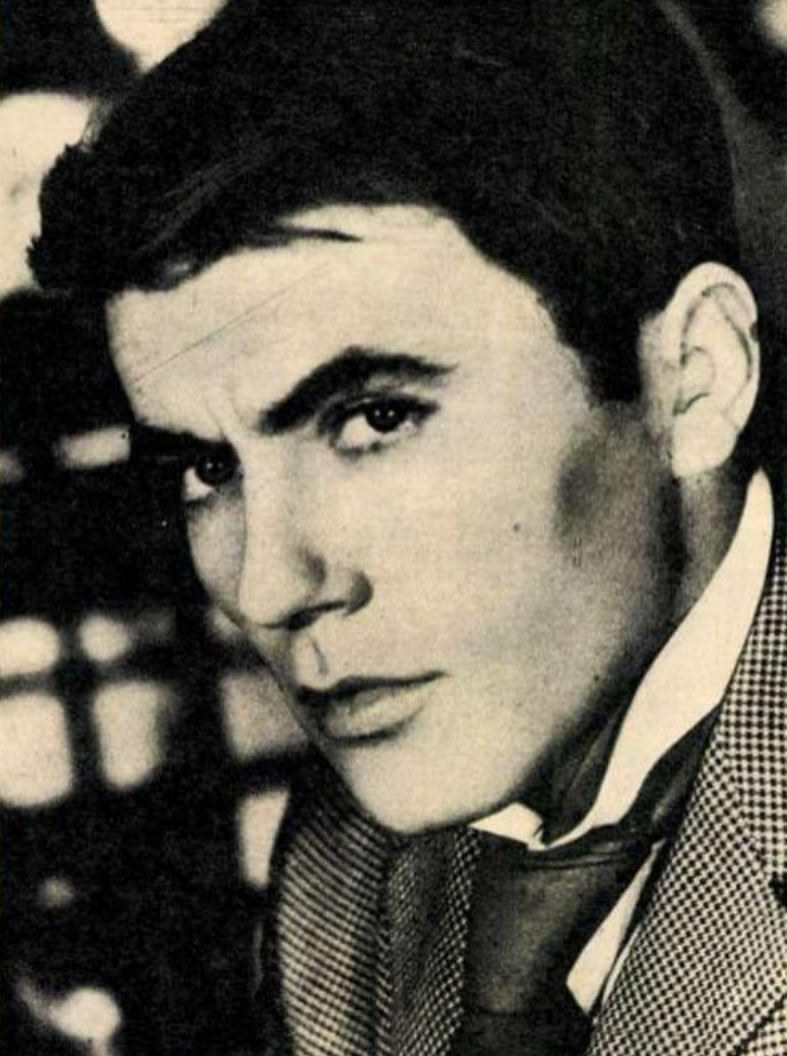
- Spătaru in 1972, photographed by S. Steiner

Background information
- Born: 2 October 1939; Aliman, Romanian Kingdom
- Died: 9 August 2004 (aged 64) Bucharest, Romania
- Genres: Easy listening
- Occupation: singer
- Years active: 1964–2004

Dan George Spătaru (Romanian pronunciation: [ˈdan spəˈta.ru]; 2 October 1939, Aliman, Constanța County – 8 September 2004, Bucharest) was a Romanian singer, the songs "Drumurile" ("The roads", 1984), "Să cântăm, chitara mea!" ("Let's sing, my guitar", 1970), and "Măicuță, îți mulțumesc" ("Dear Mother, thank you", 1987).

== Life and career ==
Spătaru was born on 2 October 1939, in a family of teachers, Gherghina and Aurel Spătaru. He spent his childhood in Aliman, his hometown, in Ion Corvin and in Medgidia, with his elder sister Puica (Maria Nicola) and his grandparents, farmers. Horses were the first passion as a child, later another passion emerged, much stronger, that of football. Spătaru grew up among his grandparents' stories and songs played by his parents. When he was 12, his mother died, and the two children moved to Medgidia with an aunt to fulfill the mother's wish that her children go to school. This is where Spătaru graduated from high school and started his football career. He evolved as a midfielder at the club FC Sportul Studențesc București.

In the third year at the "Faculty of Physical Education and Sport" he had to give up football, due to a disc herniation. He then dedicated himself to school and music. Spătaru was a student when he started playing at "Student House" in 1962. He started with Italian music, which was fashionable at the time. He inherited the love for music from his family; his father had played the violin. It was Camelia Dăscălescu who saw him. He listened to her once at "Mon Jardin" and took lessons with her. The first musical pieces performed by Spătaru were by Dăscălescu. Once on a terrace he met Temistocle Popa, who made almost all the rattles. The first great success was with "Să știi măicuța mea" by Popa. In 1972, he met his future wife, Sida, at the "Fantasio Theater" in Constanța. They married in 1974 and had a daughter, Dana. According to his wife's testimony, Spătaru was a devoted family man and a role model father.

He is the record-holder of the longest crowd applause of 16 minutes and 19 seconds. This happened in Varadero, Cuba in 1967, at an international festival.

Spătaru died of a heart attack on the morning of 8 September 2004. He was buried at Bellu cemetery in Bucharest; more than ten thousand people were present at his funeral.

== Songs ==
He started his singing career in 1966, at the "Student's house". He wrote his first hit in 1984, "Drumurile" (The roads). Subsequently, he became famous in Romania with other songs, such as: "De vrei să știi ce înseamnă roman", "Dragu mi–i de țara mea", "Drum bun", "În rândul patru", "Oare, oare", "Măicuță, îți mulțumesc", "Nimic nu e prea mult", "Nu vreau să plângi", "Prietene", "Să cântăm, chitara mea", "Spune-mi, mama ce mai face", "Spune-mi unde, spune-mi cine", "Țărăncuță, țărăncuță", "Te-am iubit, Mario", "Te-așteaptă un om", "Nu m-am gândit la despărțire", "Mai trece o zi", "Și ce dacă trece vremea", "Trecea fanfara militară", "Cine te-a iubit?", "Cerșetorul de lumină". He released albums under the Electrecord label.
