= Ultimul cartuș =

1973 film

- Directed by: Sergiu Nicolaescu
- Written by: Titus Popovici; Petre Sălcudeanu
- Produced by: Lidia Popița
- Starring: Ilarion Ciobanu
- Cinematography: Alexandru David
- Release date: 1973
- Running time: 100 minutes
- Country: Romania
- Language: Romanian

Ultimul cartuș (The Last Cartridge, The Last Bullet) is a 1973 Romanian crime film directed by Sergiu Nicolaescu. It is about commissioner Roman, portrayed by Ilarion Ciobanu, who is trying to avenge his partner's death.

== Plot ==
Mihai Roman, the partner of ex-commissioner Miclovan, tries hard to put Miclovan's assassin, Semaca, portrayed by George Constantin, behind bars. Because the court didn't have enough evidence, Semanca is set free. In his desperate efforts to imprison Semanca, Mihai Roman receives another mission and another partner at the same time. The new partner, Oarca, seems to be an ex-servant who is good at everything, moreover he is one of the best at driving on serpentines.

== Cast ==
- Ilarion Ciobanu as Mihai Roman
- George Constantin as Constantin Semaca
- Amza Pellea as Jean Semaca
- Sebastian Papaiani as Ilie Oarca
- Marga Barbu as Mrs. Semaca
- Ion Besoiu as Secretar de partid
- Colea Răutu as Bănică
- Jean Constantin as Floaca
- Nineta Gusti as Evelyne
- Carmen Maria Strujac
- Mitzura Arghezi
- Ernest Maftei as commissioner Drăgan
