= Temistocle Popa =

Romanian composer, musician, and film actor (1921–2013)

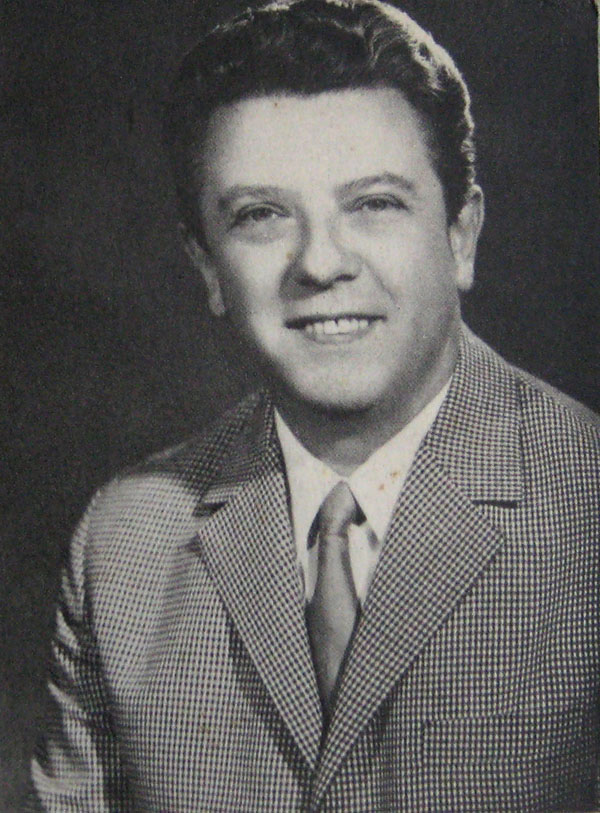

Background information
- Born: 27 June 1921; Galați, Kingdom of Romania
- Died: 26 November 2013 (aged 92) Bucharest, Romania
- Genres: Rock, jazz fusion, electronica
- Occupations: Composer, songwriter, actor
- Instruments: Flute, harp, saxophone
- Years active: 1943–2013
- Burial place: Ghencea Cemetery, Bucharest
- Education: National University of Music Bucharest

Themistocles Popa (Romanian pronunciation: [temisˈtokle ˈpopa]; 27 June 1921 – 26 November 2013) was a Romanian composer, musician, and film actor.

== Life ==
Temistocle Popa studied flute, harp, and saxophone at the National University of Music Bucharest. He then worked with musicians such as Sergiu Malagamba and Ion Dacian, and was close friends with the popular Romanian singer Maria Tănase. Beginning in the early 1960s, he wrote music for many Romanian films.

He was married to actress Cornelia Teodosiu, and resided with her in Bucharest. After the Romanian Revolution of 1989 Popa lost almost his entire fortune due to nationalization of assets.

In 2004 he received the Romanian National Order Legal Service, attaining the rank of Knight.

== Death ==
Popa died in 2013 and was buried at Ghencea Military Cemetery in Bucharest.

== List of film scores ==
- Kingdom in the Clouds (1969)
- Songs of the Sea (1971)
- Astă seară dansăm în familie (1972)
- Sfînta Tereza și diavolii (1972)
- Veronica (1972)
- Cu mîinile curate (1972)
- Ultimul cartuș (1973)
- Veronica se întoarce (1973)
- Tată de duminică (1975)
- Singurătatea florilor (1976)
- Premiera (1976)
- Roșcovanul (1976)
- Eu, tu, și... Ovidiu (1978)
- Melodii, melodii (1978)
- Secretul lui Bachus (1984)
- Zbor periculos (1984)
- Căsătorie cu repetiție (1985)
- Secretul lui Nemesis (1987)
- Duminică în familie (1988)

== Books ==
- Trecea fanfara militară (1989).
