= Gheorghe Cozorici =

Romanian actor (1933–1993)

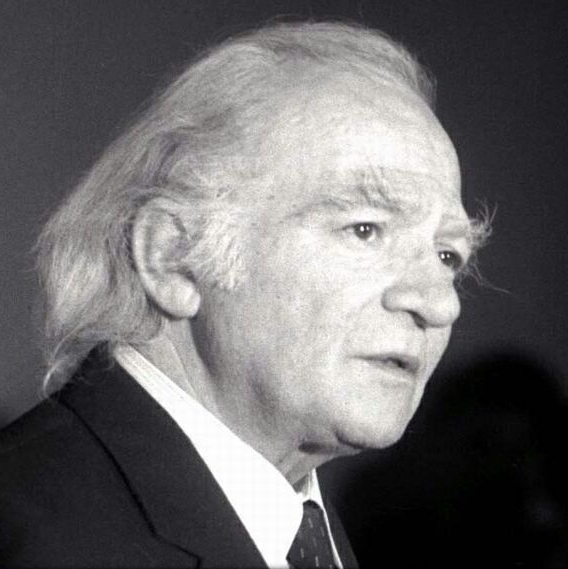
- Cozorici in 1992
- Born: 16 July 1933; Arbore, Suceava County, Kingdom of Romania
- Died: 18 December 1993 (aged 60); Bucharest, Romania
- Resting place: Bellu Cemetery, Bucharest
- Education: I. L. Caragiale National University of Theatre and Film
- Occupation: Actor
- Years active: 1956–1989
- Relatives: Ilinca Cozorici - niece (b. 06 November 2008)
- Awards: Order of Cultural Merit, 2nd class

Gheorghe Cozorici (Romanian pronunciation: [ˈɡe̯orɡe kozoritʃʲ]; 16 July 1933 – 18 December 1993) was a Romanian film and theatre actor. He appeared in more than thirty films from 1956 to 1989.

Born in Arbore, Suceava County, Cozorici graduated in 1956 from the I. L. Caragiale Institute of Theatre and Film Arts in Bucharest. He made his theatre debut the next year, in the role of Hamlet. Starting in 1959, he played at the National Theatre Bucharest. In 1971, he was awarded the Order of Cultural Merit, 2nd class.

He died at age 60 in Bucharest, and was buried in the city's Bellu Cemetery.

== Filmography ==
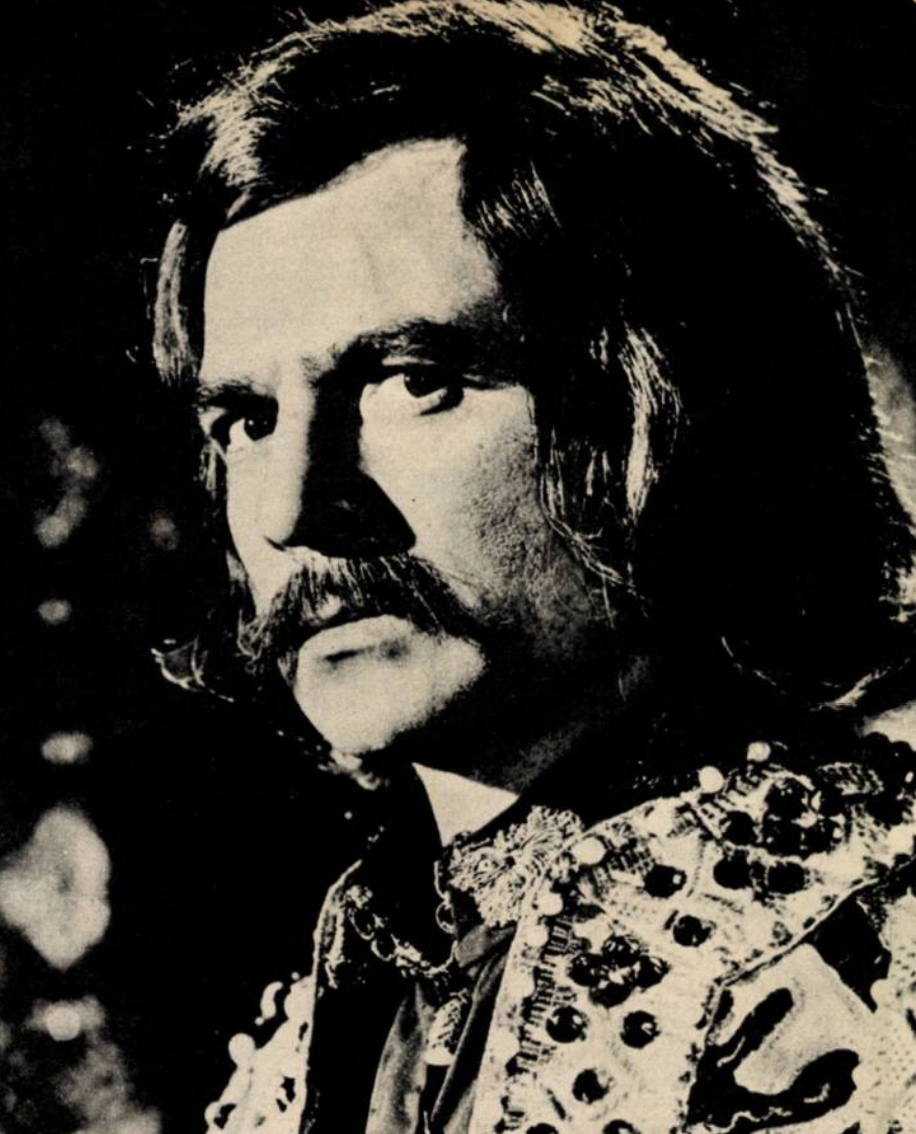
Cozorici in-character as Stephen the Great (filming of Frații Jderi, May 1973)

Year	Title	Role	Notes
1956	Mîndrie		
1963	Partea ta de vină...	Dumitrache Deac	
1965	Forest of the Hanged	Captured Romanian officer	
1966	Procesul alb		
1966	Răscoala	The teacher Dragoș	
1968	Gioconda fără surîs	Cosma	
1969	Prea mic pentru un război atît de mare	The lieutenant	
1971	Michael the Brave	The narrator	Voice
1973	Ciprian Porumbescu	The doctor	
1974	Frații Jderi	Ștefan cel Mare	
1975	Stephen the Great - Vaslui 1475	Ștefan cel Mare / Stephen the Great	
1975	Patima	Alexandru Martalogu, Păuna's third husband	
1976	Instanța amînă pronunțarea	Mareș	
1976	Ultimele zile ale verii	Chirigiu	
1977	Rîul care urca muntele	Ispas	
1978	Aurel Vlaicu	D. D. Pătrășcanu	
1978	Urgia	Victor Pavalache	
1979	The Moment	Dumitru Dumitru	
1980	Ancheta	Popovici	
1980	Vînatoarea de vulpi	Dumitru Dumitru	
1980	Stele de iarnă	Dr. Timaru	
1981	Capcana mercenarilor	Baron von Görtz	
1981	Detașamentul Concordia	The chief	
1981	Un echipaj pentru Singapore	Captain Victor Ionescu	
1981	Omul și umbra	Ion	
1983	Comoara	The judge	
1983	Dragostea și revoluția	Dumitru Dumitru	
1984	Imposibila iubire	Călin's father	
1984	Zbor periculos	Drăgan	
1984	Vreau să știu de ce am aripi	The veterinary doctor	
1984	Un petic de cer	Mihai Borza	
1985	Ciuleandra	Faranga	
1985	Ziua Z	Albu	
1985	Vară sentimentală	Aurel Goldiș	
1985	Furtună în Pacific	The Navrom director	
1986	Trenul de aur	Armand Călinescu	
1986	Din prea multă dragoste	Moldovan	
1989	Moartea unui artist	Gheorghe	(final film role)
