= Ilarion Ciobanu =

Romanian actor

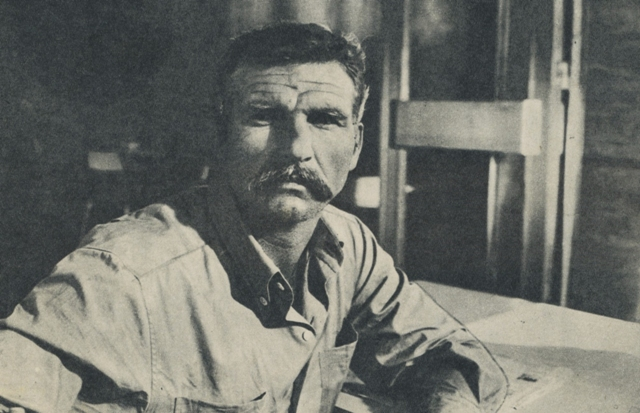
- Born: Ilarion Ciobanu; 28 October 1931; Ciucur, Tighina County, Kingdom of Romania
- Died: 7 September 2008 (aged 76); Bucharest, Romania
- Occupation(s): Actor, rugby player
- Years active: 1960–2004
- Known for: Commissioner Roman
- Height: 1.90 m (6 ft 3 in)

Ilarion Ciobanu (Romanian pronunciation: [ilariˈon tʃjoˈbanu]; 28 October 1931 – 7 September 2008) was a Romanian actor. He has been described as "a legend" in the press and the last true Romanian comic.

== Biography ==
Ciobanu was born in Ciucur, Tighina County, Kingdom of Romania (now Moldova), in a family with six brothers. When he was 8, his father, Vlase, a longshoreman in the Port of Constanța, died in an accident. His mother, Olga, moved to Constanța, where she had to work as a cook at a hospital to support her children, two of whom would die due to illness. From age 12, Ciobanu held a variety of jobs: he worked as a longshoreman, farmer, tractor driver, miner, digger, carpenter, sailor, and fisherman. He distinguished himself as a volunteer at the building of the Bumbești–Livezeni railroad; as a dump truck driver, he transported stone from Ovidiu for the construction of the Danube–Black Sea Canal.

Starting in 1948 he played rugby, first with Știința București, then with Dinamo București and finally (from 1959 to 1962) with Progresul București. In 1958 he was admitted at the I.L. Caragiale Institute of Theatre and Film Arts in Bucharest, but did not finish his studies. Instead, he worked as electrician at the Bulandra Theatre and made his debut in the movie Thirst.

Ciobanu married twice (and divorced twice) Tamara Barna, a dancer with the Ciocârlia ensemble. In 1972, he married Marion; the two adopted Natalia Doina, the daughter from his wife's first marriage, and in 1978 their son Ioachim was born.

He died in Bucharest at age 76 of laryngeal cancer; according to his wishes, his remains were cremated and his ashes were thrown into the Black Sea.

== Selected filmography ==
- Thirst (1961) – Mitru Moț
- Poveste sentimentală (1962)
- Omul de lângă tine (1962) – Popescu
- Lupeni 29 (1963) – Danet
- Cartierul veseliei (1964) – Gheorghe II
- Răscoala (1965) – Petre Petre
- Golgota (1966)
- Vremea zăpezilor (1966)
- Dacii (1966) – Gerula
- Apoi s-a născut legenda (1968) — Redea
- The Column (1968) – Gerula, a Dacian Captain
- Baltagul (1969) – shephard Nichifor Lipan
- Doi bărbați pentru o moarte (1969) – Pavel Costan
- Războiul domnițelor (1970) – Ghinda
- Michael the Brave (1971) – Stroe Buzescu
- Serata (1971)
- Asediul (1971) – Gavrilă Drăgan
- Frații (1971) – Ilarion
- Facerea lumii (1971) – Pintea
- Pădurea pierdută (1972) – Pavel
- Cu mâinile curate (1972) – Mihai Roman
- Drum în penumbră (1972)
- Ultimul cartuș (1973) – Mihai Roman
- Conspirația (1973) – Mihai Roman
- 100 de lei (1973)
- Departe de Tipperary (1973) – Mihai Roman
- Cantemir (1973) – Johannes Pierre Fripp
- Capcana (1974) - Commissioner Mihai Roman
- Nemuritorii (1974) – Vasile
- Mușchetarul român (1975) – Johannes Pierre Fripp
- Orașul văzut de sus (1975) – Dan Cernega
- No Trespassing (1975) – Ilarie
- Toate pînzele sus (1976-1978, TV Series) – Gherasim Sotir
- Pentru patrie (1977) – Captain Moise Grozea
- Trepte pe cer (1977)
- The Prophet, the Gold and the Transylvanians (1978) – Traian Brad
- Avaria (1978) – Teodosie Lazăr
- Din nou împreună (1978) – Hăisan
- The Actress, the Dollars and the Transylvanians (1978) – Traian Brad
- Gustul și culoarea fericirii (1978)
- Ecaterina Teodoroiu (1978) – officer Percea
- Dincolo de orizont (1978) – Tudose Volintiru
- Mihail, câine de circ (1979) – Captain Duncan
- Omul care ne trebuie (1979) – Vasile Mutu
- Audiența (1979)
- Rug și flacără (1980) – colonel Cristescu
- Tridentul nu răspunde (1980)
- Iancu Jianu, zapciul (1980) – Vârlan
- The Oil, the Baby and the Transylvanians (1981) – Traian Brad de la Poplaca
- O lume fără cer (1981) – Dăneț
- Iancu Jianu, haiducul (1981)
- Rîdeți ca-n viață (1983) – Tudor
- Fapt divers (1984) – Ion Barbu
- Acasă (1985) – Moș Culai
- Bătălia din umbră (1986) – sergeant Oancea
- Umbrele soarelui (1986) – Octavian Borcea
- Cetatea ascunsă (1987) – father Ionel
- O vară cu Mara (1988) – Baciul Iuga
- Crucea de piatră (1994) – Fane
- Terente, regele bălților (1995) — nea Parfenie
- Tancul (2003) – Părintele Petrian
- La urgență (2006) – Oana's father
- Iubire ca în filme (2006) – Romeo Protopopescu
- Inimă de țigan (2007) – Rodia's father
