= Românești Cave =

Cave in Românești, in Timiș County, Romania

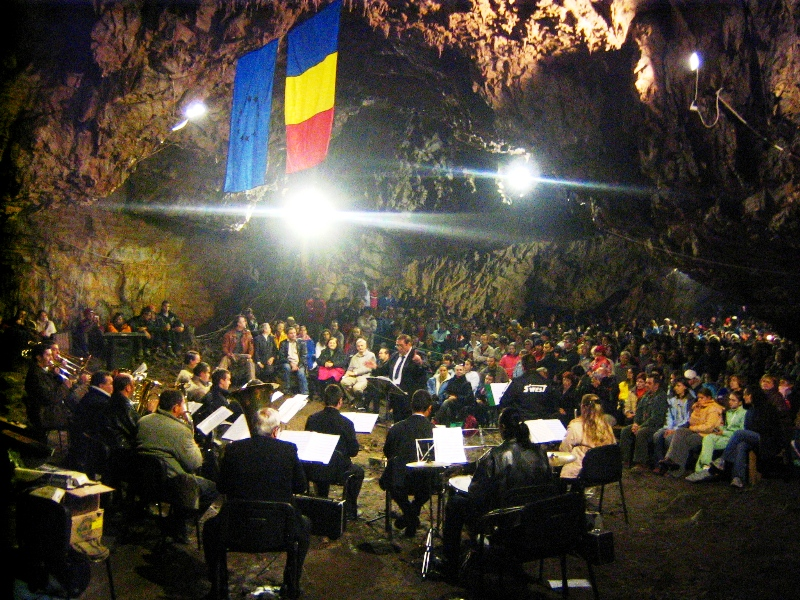
- Classical music concert by the Temeswarer Spitzbuben ensemble in the Românești Cave in October 2006

- Location within Romania
- Location: Românești (Tomești), Timiș County, Romania
- Coordinates: 45°47′50″N 22°21′4″E
- Length: 1,450 m
- Elevation: 370 m
- Discovery: 1872
- Geology: Carbonatite

The Românești Cave (Romanian: Peștera Românești) is situated southeast of the village of Românești, in Timiș County, Romania, on Filip Hill, along the left slope of the Pustina Valley in the Poiana Ruscă Mountains. The cave is also known as the Great Cave of Fereșești or the Water Cave and is registered in the Romanian Karst Cadastre under the number 1/2273, located within the Bega River basin upstream of Mănăștur. The cave is renowned for its exceptional acoustics and is notable for hosting symphonic concerts within its chambers.

== Location and access routes ==
Among the caves in the upper Bega River basin, Românești Cave stands out as the largest and most fascinating. It is situated southeast of the village of Românești, on the left, forested slope of the Pustina Valley, approximately 2.2 kilometers upstream from where the valley meets the Bega Poienilor. More precisely, the cave is carved into the northern slope of Filip Hill—locally known as Dosu Peșterii—at an elevation of 370 meters.

There are two main access routes to the Românești Cave from the village of Românești:

- The first route follows the Frăsânești road along the Bega Poienilor Valley to its confluence with the Pustina Valley, then continues along the latter for approximately 4 kilometers, reaching the vicinity of a limestone quarry. From this point, a steep ascent on the left slope via a narrow and challenging path leads to the cave entrance.
- The second route follows the watershed, crossing Stârc Hill and Merișor to a small saddle. From there, a descending path leads to the cave. This route takes about one hour on foot and is difficult to navigate without guidance from a local resident.

== History ==
The first speleological investigation of the cave was carried out in 1872 by Theodor Ortvay-Orthmayr. Subsequent archaeological excavations in 1949 revealed the remains of a cave bear (Ursus spelaeus) and fragments of Neolithic pottery. Among the findings were a grain storage pit, ceramic artifacts attributed to the Tisza and Coțofeni cultures, and a hearth. These discoveries, including the cave bear bones, are currently housed in the National Museum of Banat in Timișoara. In 1963, the cave underwent comprehensive modern research, during which a detailed plan of the cavity was produced.

== Description ==
Classified as a medium-sized cave, it has a total length of 1,450 meters and extends horizontally across three levels. The main entrance faces north-northwest, measuring 9.5 meters in width and 2 meters in height, allowing natural light to penetrate up to approximately 70 meters into the interior. In this illuminated section, the cave walls are covered with green algae.

The tourist-accessible galleries extend for a total of 340 meters and are developed horizontally along tectonic fractures once traversed by infiltration waters. The initial section of the cave is carved into grey or yellowish-white dolomitic limestone, while the remaining portion passes through tectonic breccia—a geological formation unique in Romania. The main gallery is nearly linear and spacious, with noticeable enlargements at the intersections of tectonic fissures. The largest of these is the Bat Hall, which hosts a permanent bat colony. Several side passages branch off from this hall, though some become impassable due to significant narrowing.

Condensation and infiltration water, particularly abundant during periods of rainfall, contribute to the formation of several gullies, micro-gullies, and small pools on the cave floor. On the walls and ceiling—especially in the terminal section—various speleogenetic features can be observed, including corrosion hieroglyphs, septa, and corrosion pillars. In many areas, decalcified clay is present, displaying a characteristic "leopard skin" pattern.

As the cave is in an early stage of speleothem development, it contains relatively few formations, including slender tubular stalactites ("macaroni"), diverse wall flowstones, stalagmite crusts with rimstone dams and cave pearls, as well as stalagmites, domes, and columns. One notable column, measuring 7 meters in length and known as "Tibia and Fibone," has fractured as a result of floor displacement.

== Concerts ==
Since 1984, the Speotimiș Speleological Association has organized a series of concerts in the Concert Hall of the Românești Cave, featuring prominent performers from various musical genres including classical, jazz, blues, rock, and electronic music. Notable participants have included the Royal Danish Orchestra, the Szeged Symphony Orchestra, the Brass Quintet (Vienna), the Arad Philharmonic, the Banat Philharmonic of Timișoara, Ștefan Ruha, Alexandra Guțu, Kathleen Evans, Gabriel Croitoru, as well as choirs such as Margana, Sabin Drăgoi, St. Rafailo Banatski (Serbia), and Canon. Renowned bands such as Bega Blues Band, Survolaj, Nightlosers, Cargo, Celelalte Cuvinte, and Implant pentru Refuz have also performed. A highlight was the performance by Zdob și Zdub, which attracted a record audience of 2,000 spectators to the cave.

== Visiting conditions ==
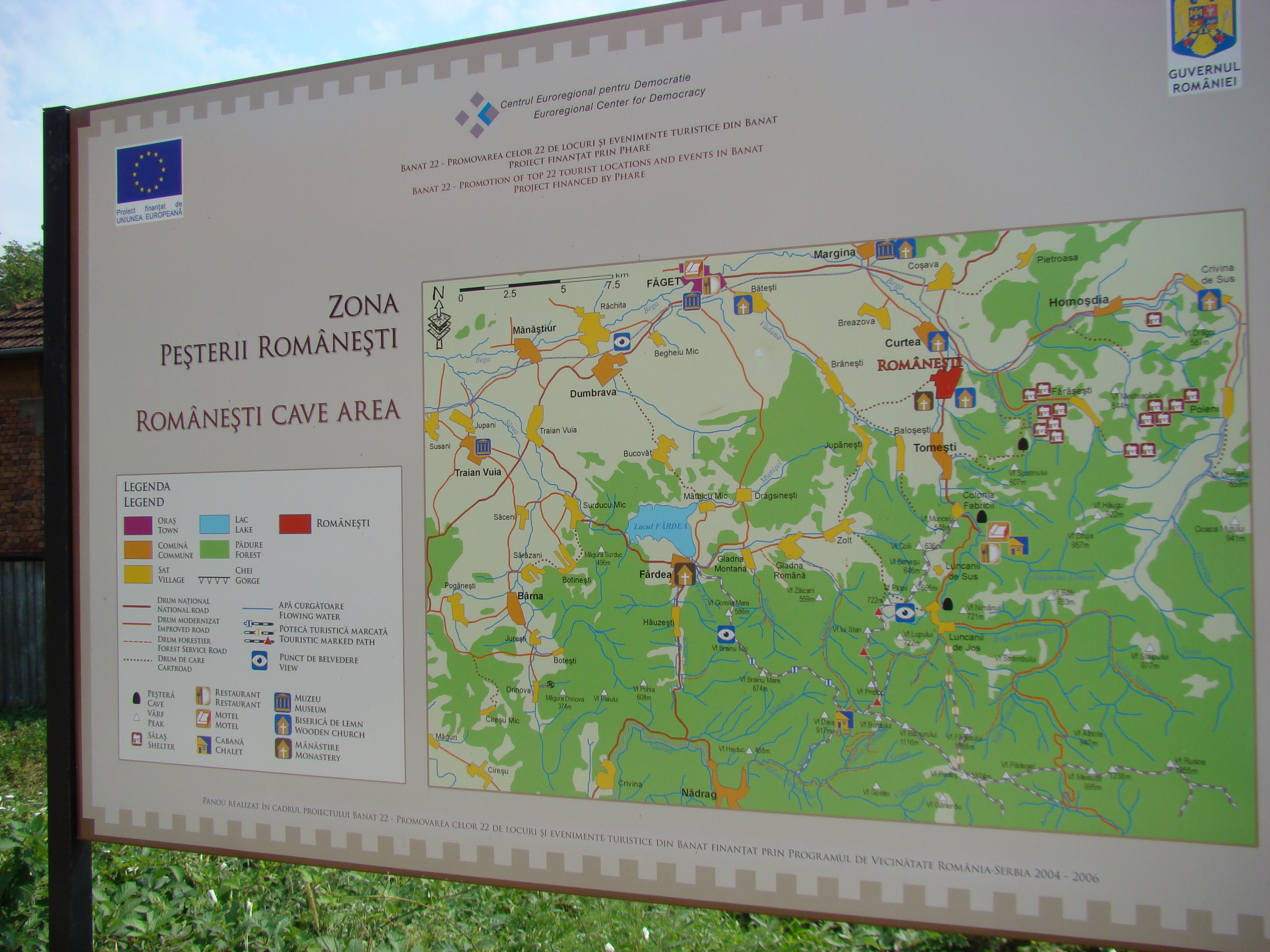
Tourist board for the Românești Cave area

Historically, the cave was frequently visited by local inhabitants who collected guano, an activity that led to the degradation of some speleothems. Although the cave remains undeveloped, it is relatively easy to traverse. Visitors are advised to wear hard hats and warm clothing beneath protective overalls, as the internal air temperature ranges between 6.5°C and 8.5°C. Caution is recommended near the entrance due to archaeological excavations, as well as within the cave, where the guano-covered floor can be wet and slippery. The estimated duration of a visit is approximately 30 minutes.
