= Cîntarea României =

Romanian cultural festival held 1976–1989

Cîntarea României (meaning "the song of Romania") was an annual national cultural festival in the Socialist Republic of Romania since 1976 intended to promote ideologically-approved artistic manifestations, featuring both professional and amateur artists from across the country. Being part of Ceaușescu's policies to promote National Communism in Romania, the festival used folklore (especially folk music) and it had a role in shaping the national identity of the Romanians and the view of Romanian history.

The festival gets its name from a 19th-century essay generally attributed to Alecu Russo.

Dragoș Petrescu termed it "national Stalinism in festival mode."
