= Boiu Mare =

- Commune
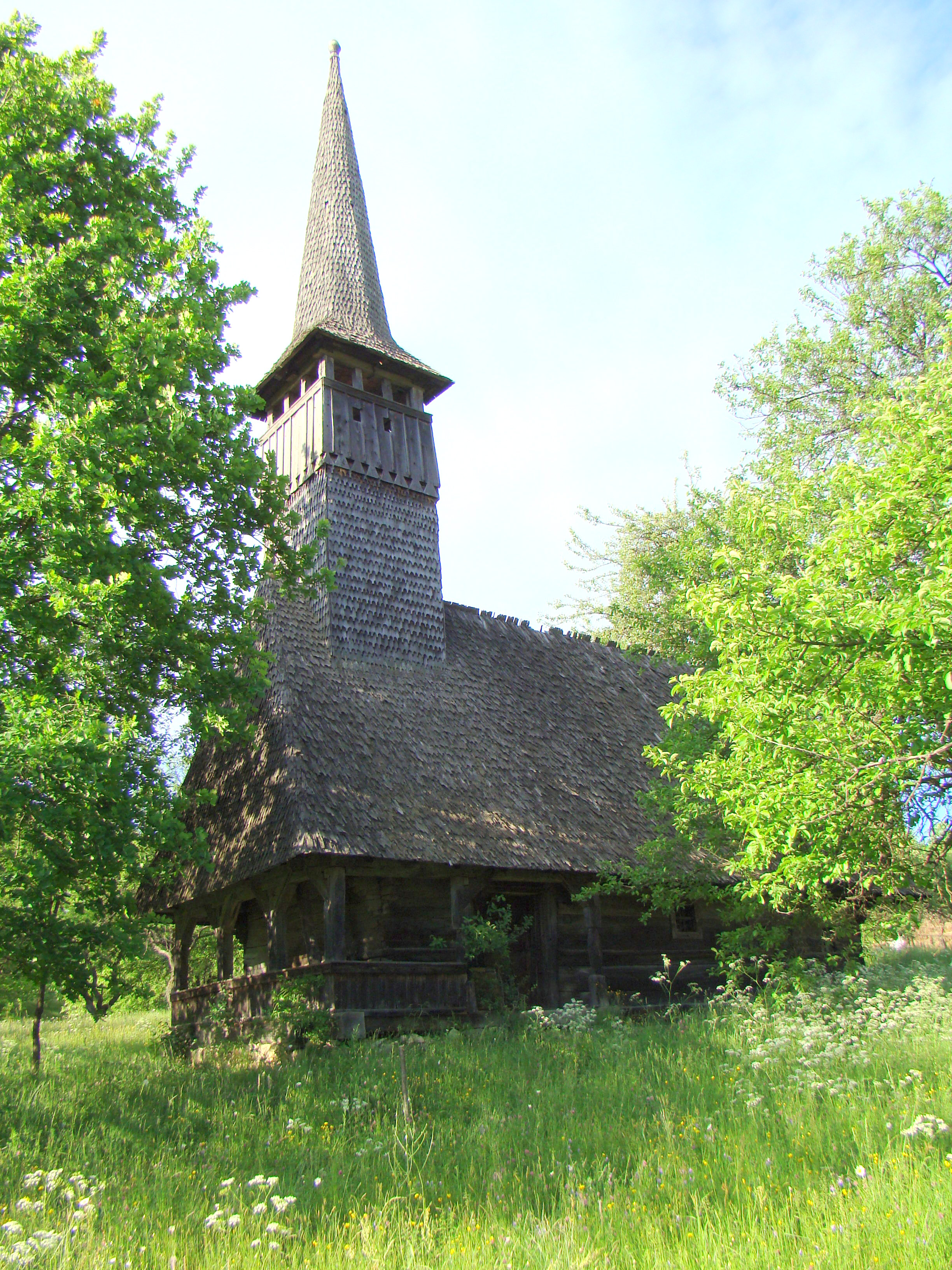
- Wooden church in Frâncenii Boiului

- Location in Maramureș County

- Location in Romania
- Coordinates: 47°24′N 23°35′E
- Country: Romania
- County: Maramureș

Government
  - Mayor (2020–2024): Gavril Pop (PSD)
- Area: 59.54 km^{2} (22.99 sq mi)
- Elevation: 419 m (1,375 ft)
- Population (2021-12-01): 1,077
  - Density: 18.09/km^{2} (46.85/sq mi)
- Time zone: UTC+02:00 (EET)
  - Summer (DST): UTC+03:00 (EEST)
- Postal code: 437060
- Area code: +40 x59
- Vehicle reg.: MM
- Website: primariaboiumare.ro

Boiu Mare (Hungarian: Nagybúny) is a commune in Maramureș County, Transylvania, Romania. It is composed of four villages: Boiu Mare, Frâncenii Boiului (Frinkfalva), Prislop (Jóháza), and Românești (Szalmapatak).

The commune is located in the southwestern part of Maramureș County, 45 km (28 mi) south of the county seat, Baia Mare, on the border with Sălaj County. It is crossed by county road DJ109G, which starts in Mesteacăn, 6 km (3.7 mi) to the west, and ends in Târgu Lăpuș, some 30 km (19 mi) to the east.

Historical population
| Year | Pop. | ±% |
|---|---|---|
| 1880 | 1,948 | — |
| 1900 | 2,034 | +4.4% |
| 1910 | 1,971 | −3.1% |
| 1930 | 1,964 | −0.4% |
| 1956 | 1,932 | −1.6% |
| 1977 | 1,732 | −10.4% |
| 1992 | 1,455 | −16.0% |
| 2002 | 1,276 | −12.3% |
| 2011 | 1,131 | −11.4% |
| 2021 | 1,077 | −4.8% |
Source: Census data

At the 2021 census, Boiu Mare had a population of 1,077, with an absolute majority (97%) of ethnic Romanians.
