= Maria Ciobanu =

Romanian folk singer

- Born: 3 September 1937 (age 89); Roșiile, Vâlcea County, Romania
- Genres: Folk
- Occupation: Singer
- Years active: 1961–present
- Labels: Electrecord, Eurostar, Oltenia Star Music

Maria Ciobanu (born 3 September 1937 in Roșiile) is a Romanian folk singer. Her repertoire include more than 700 recorded songs for Romanian, Yugoslavian and Holland Record Companies, Romanian Radio and TV... Some of her famous songs are: „Lie ciocârlie”, „Aurelu’ mamei”, „Doar o mamă poate ști”, „Spune-mi neică-adevărat”, „Cei mai frumoși ani ai mei”, „Ce n-aș da să mai fiu mică”, „Roată, roată...” and so on. She was married to Romanian singer Ion Dolănescu.

== Honours ==
- 2 "Golden discs"
- 2002: Cross of Faithful Service, class III.
- 2004: Ordinul Meritul Cultural.

== Bibliography ==
- Tiberiu Alexandru, text de prezentare pe coperta LP-ului Dulce floare-i tinerețea (ST-EPE 01954)
