= Roșiile =

- Commune
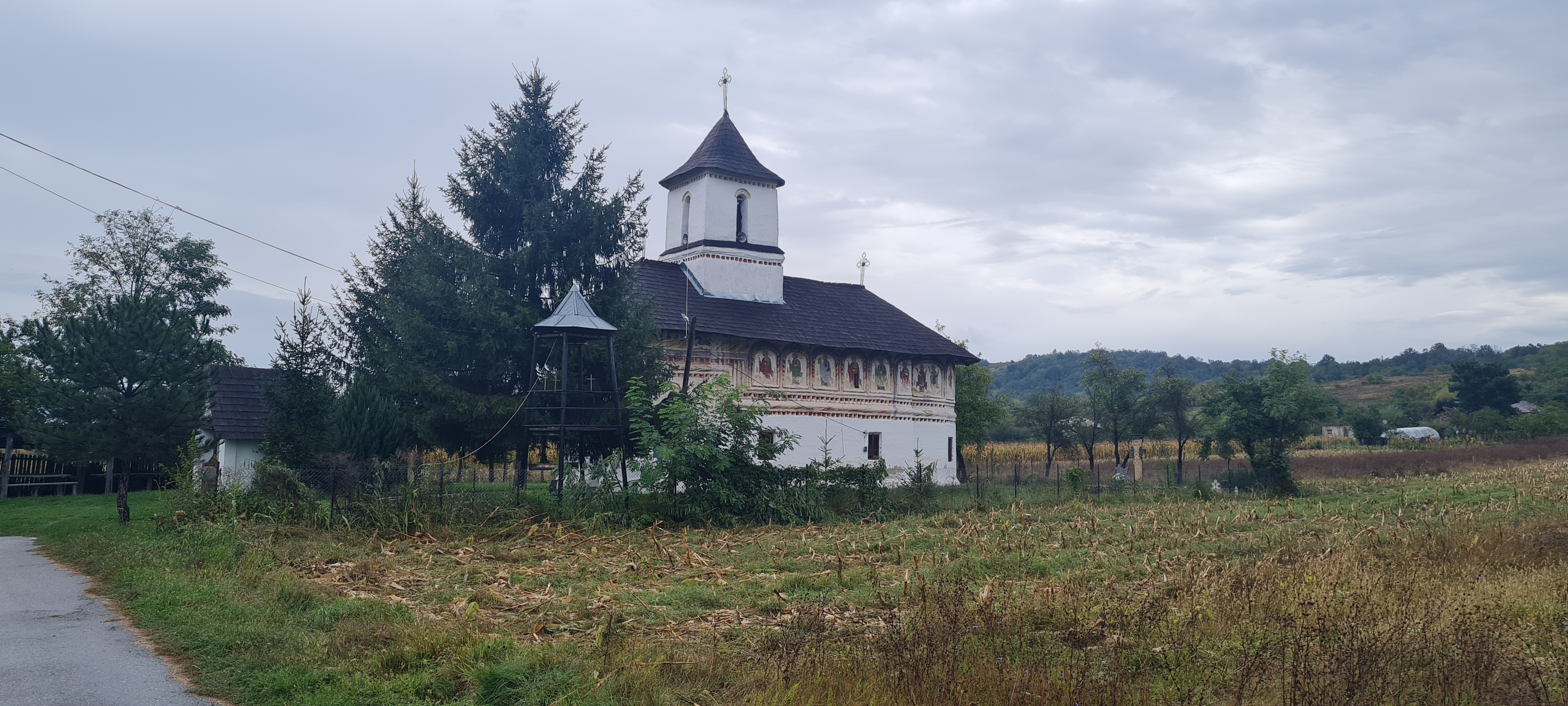
- Church in Pleșești

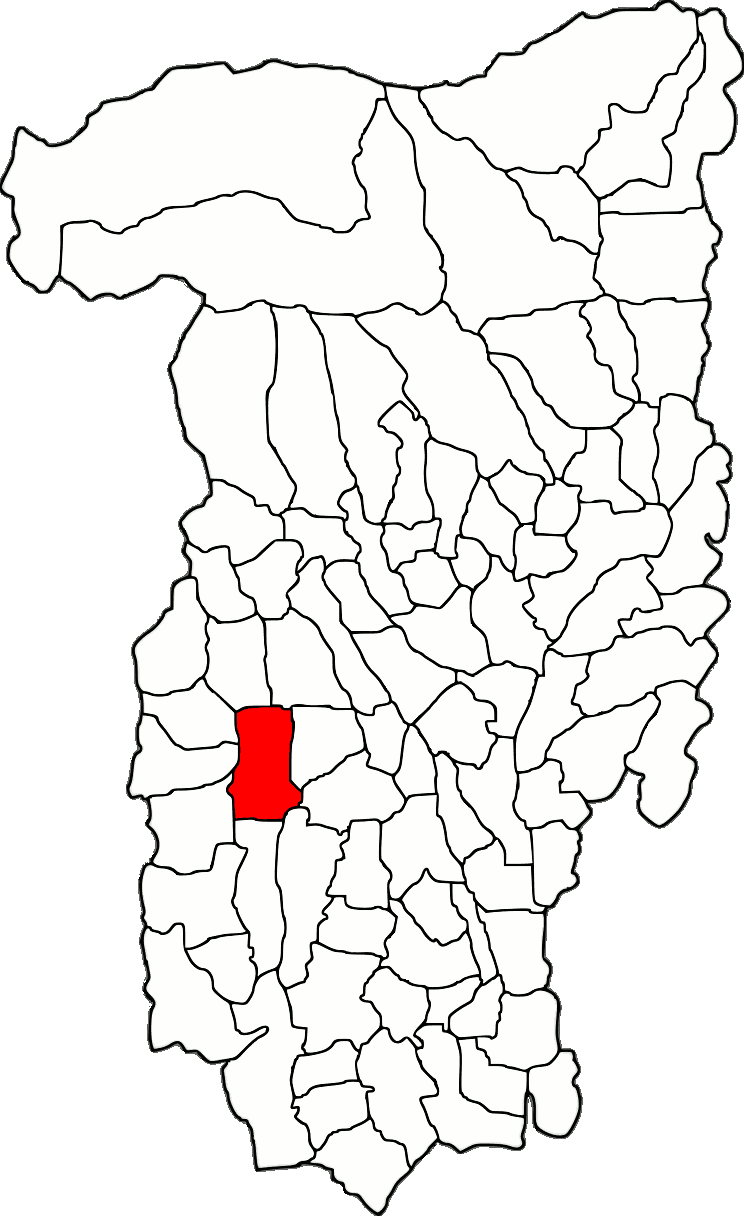
- Location in Vâlcea County

- Location in Romania
- Coordinates: 44°52′N 23°56′E
- Country: Romania
- County: Vâlcea

Government
  - Mayor (2024–2028): Dumitru Constantin (PNL)
- Area: 68.88 km^{2} (26.59 sq mi)
- Elevation: 290 m (950 ft)
- Population (2021-12-01): 2,247
  - Density: 32.62/km^{2} (84.49/sq mi)
- Time zone: UTC+02:00 (EET)
  - Summer (DST): UTC+03:00 (EEST)
- Postal code: 247555
- Area code: +(40) 250
- Vehicle reg.: VL
- Website: www.primariarosiile.ro

Roșiile is a commune located in Vâlcea County, Oltenia, Romania. It is composed of eleven villages: Balaciu, Cherăști, Hotăroaia, Lupuiești, Păsărei, Pertești, Pleșești, Rățălești, Romanești, Roșiile, and Zgubea.

Historical population
Year	Pop.	±%
2002	3,037	—
2011	2,759	−9.2%
2021	2,247	−18.6%
Source: Census data

== Natives ==
- Maria Ciobanu (born 1937), folk singer
- Leontina Vaduva (born 1960), soprano
