= List of Romanian actresses =

The following is a list of notable actresses from Romania.

== A ==
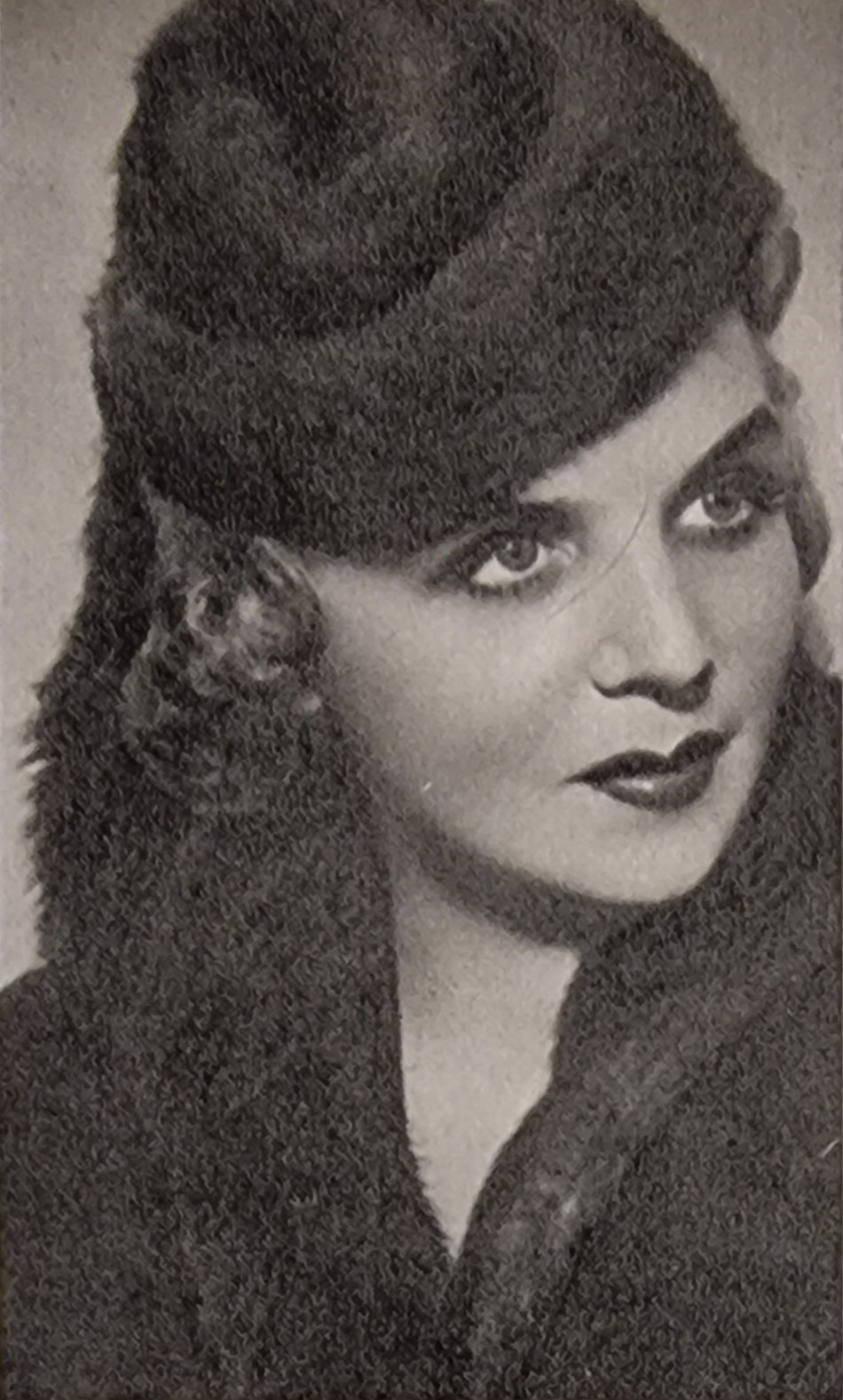
Natasa Alexandra

- Ioana Abur
- Graziela Albini
- Elena Albu
- Alexandrina Alessandrescu
- Natașa Alexandra
- Vivian Alivizache
- Afrodita Androne
- Anca Androne
- Violeta Andrei
- Afrodita Androne
- Coca Andronescu
- Monica Anghel
- Ioana Anastasia Anton
- Firuța Apetrei
- Mitzura Arghezi

== B ==
- Ramona Bădescu
- Alice Barb
- Ioana Barbu
- Marga Barbu
- Eugenia Bădulescu
- Marica Bălan
- Leopoldina Bălănuță
- Maria Bănică
- Cecilia Bârbora
- Monica Bârlădeanu
- Agatha Bârsescu
- Monalisa Basarab
- Lamia Beligan
- Mădălina Bellariu Ion
- Alina Berzunțeanu
- Andreea Bibiri
- Tala Birell
- Ingrid Bisu
- Monica Bîrlădeanu
- Rodica Popescu Bitănescu
- Ioana Blaj
- Coca Bloos
- Adriana Bogdan
- Simona Bondoc
- Eugenia Bosânceanu
- Andreea Boșneag
- Tamara Buciuceanu
- Mariana Buruiană
- Maria Buză
- Aura Buzescu
- Olga Bucătaru
- Flavia Buref

== C ==
- Leny Caler
- Anda Călugăreanu
- Rozina Cambos
- Ralu Caragea
- Elena Caragiu
- Lilly Carandino
- Ninela Caranfil
- Elena Caragiu
- Magda Catone
- Diana Cavallioti
- Florina Cercel
- Magdalena Cernat
- Paula Chirilă
- Angela Chiuaru
- Alina Chivulescu
- Cristina Ciobănașu
- Maria Ciucurescu
- Sonia Cluceru
- Dina Cocea
- Tanți Cocea
- Victoria Cociaș-Șerban
- Ana Colda
- Dana Comnea
- Corina Constantinescu
- Aurora Cornu
- Laura Cosoi
- Ioana Crăciunescu
- Laura Creț
- Tamara Crețulescu
- Adina Cristescu

== D ==
- Cezara Dafinescu
- Monica Davidescu
- Mariana Dănescu
- Corina Dănilă
- Cristina Deleanu
- Iarina Demian
- Florica Demion
- Anca Dinicu
- Maria Dinulescu
- Emilia Dobrin
- Mădălina Drăghici
- Anca Dumitra
- Silvia Dumitrescu-Timică
- Diana Dumitrescu

== E ==
- Mimi Enăceanu
- Alina Eremia

== F ==
- Andrea Faciu
- Liliana Farcaș
- Florina Fernandes
- Lisa Ferraday
- Tania Filip
- Maria Filotti
- Ioana Flora
- Cristina Flutur
- Beate Fredanov

== G ==
- Carmen Galin
- Adina Galupa
- Irina Gărdescu
- Mădălina Ghenea
- Bunica Gherghina
- Luminița Gheorghiu
- Monica Ghiuță
- Mădălina Ghițescu
- Laura Glavan
- Antoaneta Glodeanu
- Elvira Godeanu
- Ilinca Goia
- Alina Grigore
- Patricia Grigoriu
- Nineta Gusti
- Roxana Guttman

== H ==
- Alexandrina Halic
- Manuela Hărăbor
- Liliana Hodorogea
- Nunuța Hodoș

== I ==
- Aimée Iacobescu
- Luminița Iacobescu
- Andreea Ibacka
- Tatiana Iekel
- Agata Nicolau Iliescu
- Pola Illéry
- Angela Ioan
- Romanița Ionescu
- Ileana Iordache
- Cerasela Iosifescu
- Rada Istrate

== J ==
- Elisabeta Jar
- Ildikó Jarcsek-Zamfirescu
- Jojo

== K ==
- Imola Kézdi

== L ==
- Elizza La Porta
- Dorina Lazăr
- Veronica Lazăr
- Raluca Lăzăruț
- Ileana Lazariuc
- Cornelia Lazăr Turian
- Doina Limbășanu
- Carmen Lopăzan
- Nicoleta Luciu
- Iulia Lumânare
- Diana Lupescu
- Roxana Lupu

== M ==
- Olimpia Mălai
- Agepsina Macri
- Rodica Mandache
- Ilinca Manolache
- Gilda Manolescu
- Teodora Mareș
- Adela Mărculescu
- Anamaria Marinca
- Gilda Marinescu
- Medeea Marinescu
- Ica Matache
- Olga Delia Mateescu
- Irina Mazanitis
- Adela Mărculescu
- Liana Mărgineanu
- Olimpia Melinte
- Cătălina Mihai
- Sore Mihalache
- Lulu Mihăescu
- Mariana Mihuț
- Ada Milea
- Virginia Mirea
- Mihaela Mitrache
- Florentina Mocanu
- Maria Mohor
- Ana Maria Moldovan
- Maia Morgenstern
- Oana Moșneagu
- Florentina Mosora
- Claudia Motea
- Irina Movilă
- Alexandra Murăruș
- Rodica Mureșan
- Lucia Mureșan
- Cătălina Murgea

== N ==
- Daniela Nane
- Rodica Negrea
- Mara Nicolescu
- Michaela Niculescu
- Elizabeth Nizan
- Nouria Nouri

== O ==
- Valeria Ogășanu
- Draga Olteanu-Matei
- Anda Onesa
- Mara Oprea
- Mirela Oprișor

== P ==
- Anca Pandrea
- Katia Pascariu
- Margareta Pâslaru
- Gina Patrichi
- Ioana Pavelescu
- Cornelia Pavlovici
- Oana Pellea
- Hilda Péter
- Eliza Petrăchescu
- Dorotheea Petre
- Irina Petrescu
- Mariella Petrescu
- Maria Ploae
- Margareta Pogonat
- Tania Popa
- Adela Popescu
- Elvira Popescu
- Emilia Popescu
- Eufrosina Popescu
- Rodica Popescu Bitănescu
- Stela Popescu
- Violeta Popescu
- Ofelia Popii
- Maria Popistașu
- Lavinia Postolache
- Eugenia Popovici
- Ileana Popovici
- Silvia Popovici
- Mariana Preda
- Ileana Predescu
- Marina Procopie
- Aglae Pruteanu

== R ==
- Mihaela Rădescu
- Catinca Ralea
- Marietta Rareș
- Irina Răchițeanu
- Irina Rădulescu
- Fanny Rebreanu
- Virginia Rogin
- Dana Rogoz
- Aristizza Romanescu
- Maria Rotaru
- Oana Rusu

== S ==
- Marietta Sadova
- Anda Saltelechi
- Ștefana Samfira
- Frosa Sarandy
- Irina Sârbu
- Oana Sârbu
- Klára Sebők
- Valeria Seciu
- Elena Sereda
- Anca Sigartău
- Ruxandra Sireteanu
- Mihaela Sîrbu
- Ileana Stana-Ionescu
- Zoe Anghel Stanca
- Julieta Strâmbeanu
- Carmen Maria Strujac
- Lucia Sturdza-Bulandra
- Carmen Stănescu
- Enikő Szilágyi
- Julieta Szönyi

== Ș ==
- Adriana Șchiopu
- Eugenia Șerban
- Zizi Șerban
- Simona Șomăcescu

== T ==
- Cristina Tacoi
- Rodica Tapalagă
- Vasilica Tastaman
- Carmen Tănase
- Dorina Tănăsescu
- Sânziana Tarța
- Maria Teslaru
- Sidi Tal
- Sanda Toma
- Liliana Tomescu
- Ilinca Tomoroveanu
- Olga Tudorache

== Ț ==
- Alexia Țalavutis
- Sanda Țăranu
- Anca Țurcașiu

== U ==
- Ana Ularu
- Melania Ursu

== V ==
- Anamaria Vartolomei
- Selena Vasilache
- Tora Vasilescu
- Laura Vasiliu
- Iulia Vântur
- Maria Ventura
- Iulia Verdeș
- Sofia Vicoveanca
- Clara Vodă
- Maria Voluntaru
- Viorica Vrioni

== Z ==
- Raluca Zamfirescu
- Oana Zăvoranu
- Mirela Zeța
