= Mircea Diaconu =

Romanian actor, writer and politician (1949–2024)

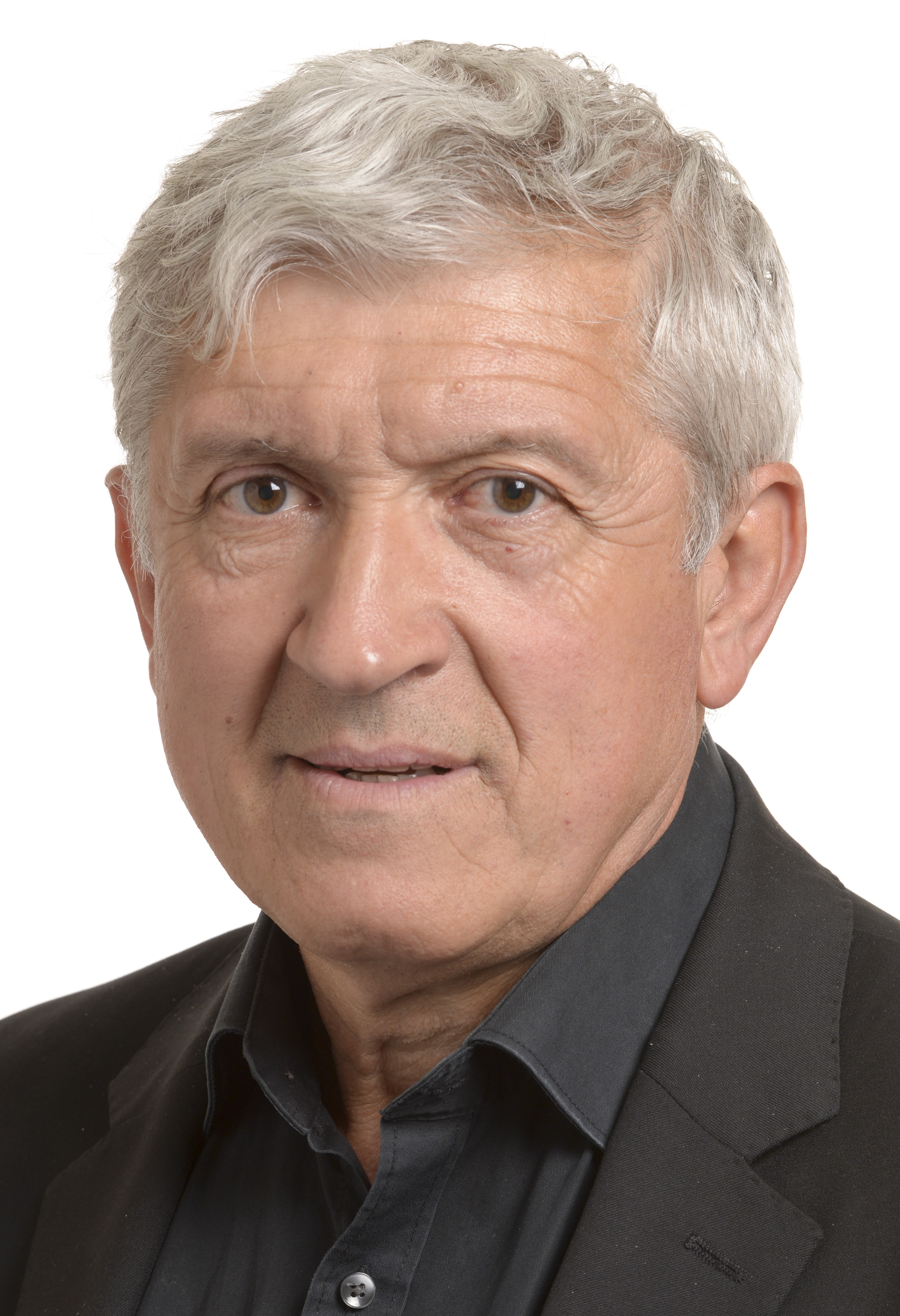
- Official portrait, 2014

Minister of Culture
- In office 7 May 2012 – 25 June 2012
- Prime Minister: Victor Ponta
- Preceded by: Hunor Kelemen
- Succeeded by: Puiu Hașotti

Member of the European Parliament for Romania
- In office 1 July 2014 – 2 July 2019

Personal details
- Born: 24 December 1949 Vlădești, Argeș County, Romania
- Died: 14 December 2024 (aged 74) Bucharest, Romania
- Party: Independent (2014-2024)
- Other political affiliations: National Liberal Party (2008–2014)
- Spouse: Diana Lupescu (m. 1980)
- Children: 2
- Education: I.L. Caragiale Institute of Theatre and Film Arts (IATC)
- Occupation: Actor, writer, politician
- Awards: National Order of Merit, Officer rank

Mircea Diaconu (Romanian pronunciation: [ˈmirtʃe̯a diˈakonu]; 24 December 1949 – 14 December 2024) was a Romanian actor, writer and politician. First appearing on stage in 1970, and on screen two years later, Diaconu pursued a lengthy career in both formats, working with a series of prominent directors. He acted in some sixty films through the 2000s, and continued to act in theatre during the ensuing decade. He took part in the Romanian Revolution of 1989. In 2008, he entered electoral politics, becoming a senator, and subsequently serving a term as a Member of the European Parliament. In 2019, he ran for president, placing fourth.

== Biography ==
=== Acting, writing, Revolution ===
Born in Vlădești, Argeș County, he graduated high school in Câmpulung in 1967 and Bucharest's I.L. Caragiale Institute of Theatre and Film Arts in 1971. He was obliged to join the Romanian Communist Party during his second year of university, due to the high grades he had achieved. In 1980, he married Diana Lupescu, herself an actress; the couple had two children.

Diaconu made his theatrical debut a year before finishing university, at the Bulandra Theater, in Truman Capote's The Grass Harp. His screen debut came in Dan Pița's Stone Wedding (1972); he would later appear in the same director's Philip the Good (1975). Other directors with whom he worked include Alexandru Tatos (Red Apples, 1975; Sequences, 1982; and The Secret of the Secret Weapon, 1988), Virgil Calotescu (Bucharest Identity Card, 1982; and Repeated Wedding, 1985), Nae Caranfil (Asfalt Tango, 1996; and Filantropica, 2002) and Cătălin Mitulescu (The Way I Spent the End of the World, 2006). In all, he appeared in more than sixty films.

Diaconu worked with Lucian Pintilie both in film (the 1981 De ce trag clopotele, Mitică?) and in theater: Gogol's The Government Inspector at Bulandra, and Shakespeare's As You Like It at the Nottara Theater. Liviu Ciulei hired him at Bulandra in 1972, and he remained there for a decade, before moving on to Nottara. At Bulandra, he appeared in Twelfth Night and The Tempest, both under Ciulei's direction; and in Marin Sorescu's Răceala, directed by Dan Micu. At Nottara, he appeared in Alexander Ostrovsky's The Forest; Ultimul bal, after Liviu Rebreanu's Forest of the Hanged; and Mihai Ispirescu's Într-o dimineață. He became the director of Nottara Theater in 2004, working as such until his resignation in 2011.

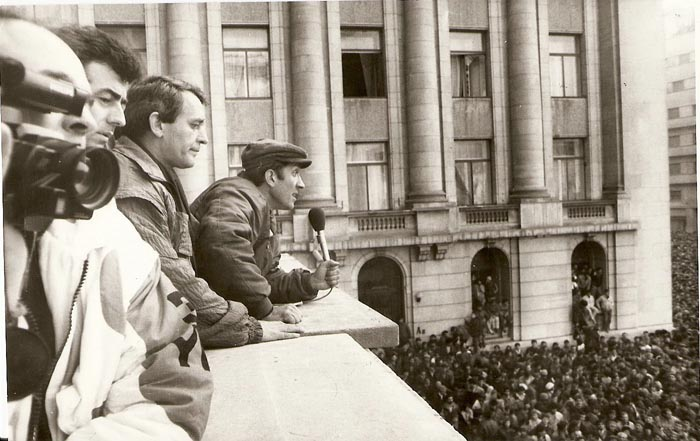
Diaconu addressing a crowd during the Romanian Revolution in 1989

A participant in the Romanian Revolution, he was rehearsing a play at Nottara when Nicolae Ceaușescu's final speech began on 21 December 1989. During the day, he and his colleagues organized students to go to area factories and urge workers to declare an immediate strike. He spent the night outdoors with students, believing that, although the uprising lacked familiar leaders who could be trusted, the crowd at least recognized popular actors' faces. During the night, Securitate secret police fired through apartment windows, while the next morning, Diaconu saw that agents had quietly killed people with brass knuckles. However, he soon noticed that a revolution was in full swing, the boulevards leading to the city center packed with advancing workers who had trapped two tanks, one of which he rode to the Central Committee building from which Ceaușescu had spoken the previous day. Later, he was among several figures to appear before a microphone in Palace Square. Addressing a throng chanting anti-Ceaușescu slogans, he repeated an appeal for calm. The following year, he was a founding member of the Civic Alliance Foundation.

In 1990, he became the country's first actor to resign his contract with a theater and become a freelancer. Other theaters with which he appeared include Theatrum Mundi and the National Theatre Bucharest. He taught acting at his alma mater between 1977 and 1978, and again from 1991 to 1998. He wrote three books that appeared under the Communist regime. The first, Șugubina (1977), is a volume of short stories. The second, La noi, când vine iarna, was initially published as a children's book in 1980 and was republished as a novel for adults in 2013. The third, Scaunul de pânză al actorului (1985), includes sketches about the theatrical world. In 2000, then-President Emil Constantinescu awarded him the National Order of Merit, Officer rank.

=== Politics ===
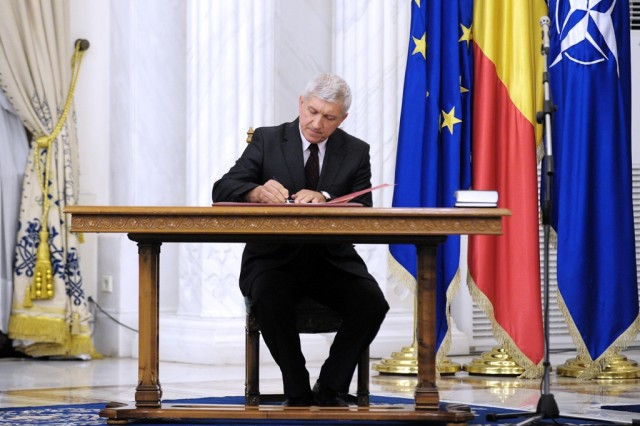
Diaconu as Culture Minister in 2012

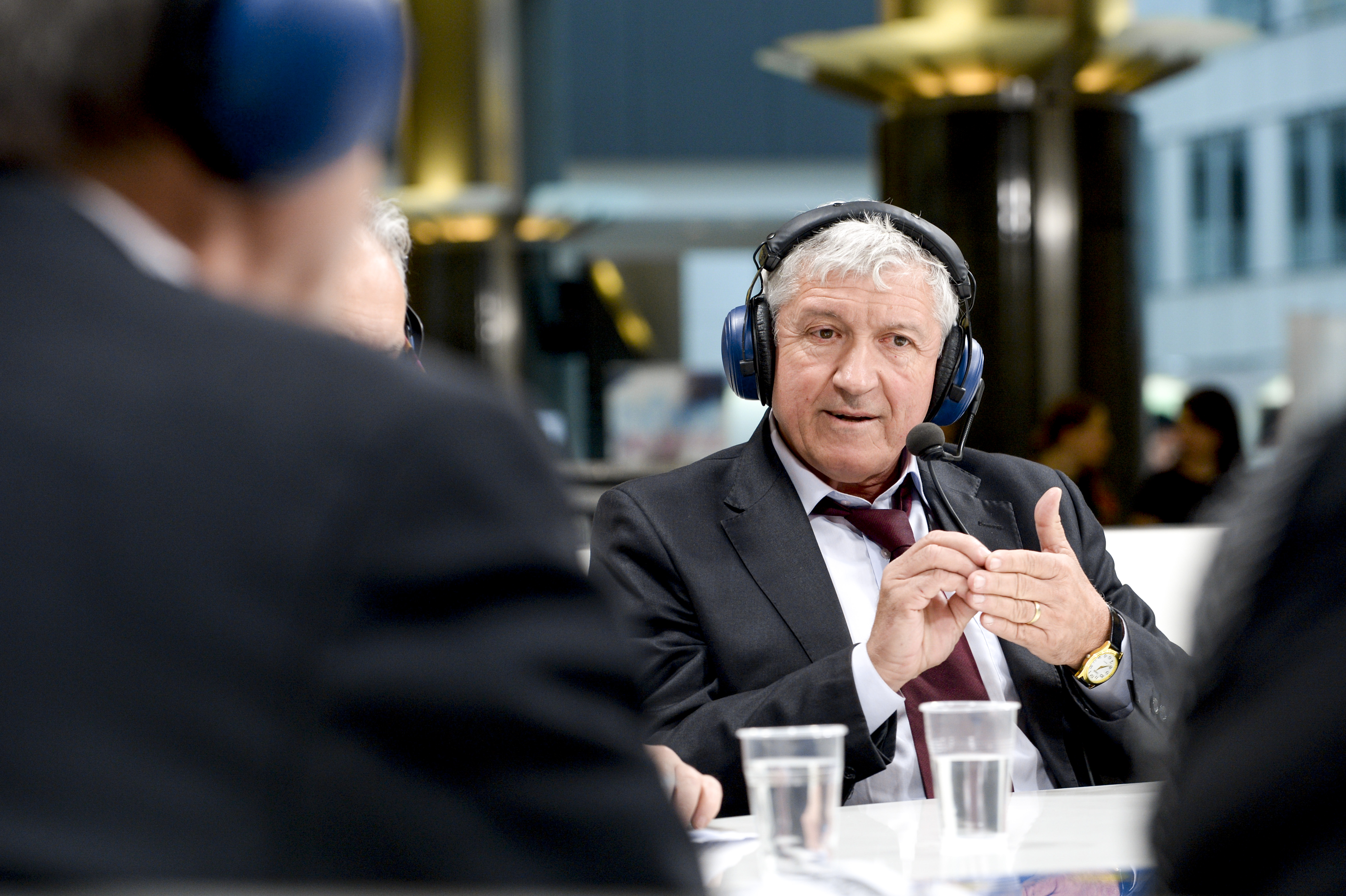
Diaconu as a Member of the European Parliament in 2016

Diaconu began his political career in 2008, when he was elected to the Senate for Argeș County as a member of the National Liberal Party (PNL). While there, he served on the culture committee; his term expired at the following election. In May 2012, he was named Culture Minister in the new Victor Ponta cabinet, but was forced out of office the following month when the High Court of Cassation and Justice ruled there was a conflict of interest between his ministerial position and his managerial role at the theater. The same year, he was the subject of an investigation by prosecutors for having helped hire his wife as a director at Nottara Theatre in 2007, despite the fact that she did not meet the necessary qualifications.

In March 2014, when the PNL failed to include him on its list of candidates for that year's European Parliament election, Diaconu decided to run as an independent. Although his candidacy was initially rejected by the electoral authorities because the 2012 court decision had found him ineligible for political office, an appeals court placed him on the ballot, finding that he could in fact run for other offices than the one involved in the older case (that is, Senator). During the campaign, he built up the image of an independent persecuted by bureaucratic institutions determined to keep him out of office, benefiting from favorable media coverage. He won some 380,000 votes or 6.8% of the national total (ahead of two political parties that won seats), assuring him a term as an MEP. As an independent, he was only required to win 3.1% of the vote in order to secure a seat; he obtained double digits in the counties of Constanța (13.3%) and Botoșani (10.4%). He is thought to have significantly eroded the PNL vote, with one party member, Nicolae Robu, claiming Diaconu cut its performance by nearly half. In the 2014–2019 legislature of the European Parliament, he sat with the Alliance of Liberals and Democrats for Europe Group, and was vice president of the Culture Committee.

In August 2019, Diaconu entered the presidential race as an independent. Subsequently, ALDE and PRO Romania formed an electoral alliance in support of Diaconu, called "Un Om" ("one man" or "a human being"). His proposals included expanding the Cernavodă Nuclear Power Plant and salvaging the Rovinari Power Station; building and revitalizing Danube River ports and bridges, using European Union funds; unifying small landholdings into larger, more profitable farms; and a stricter approach to school discipline, such as banning mobile phones and reintroducing uniforms. On foreign policy, he called for Romania to play a stronger role within the EU and NATO, while reaffirming the country's alliance with the United States. His policies seemingly courted a rural electorate and recalled those of the 1990s and early 2000s, when Ion Iliescu was president. Diaconu finished in fourth place, with nearly 9% of the vote.

=== Death ===
Diaconu died from colon cancer at the Institutul Clinic Fundeni, in Bucharest, on 14 December 2024. He was 74.

== Electoral history ==
=== European elections ===
| Election | Votes | Percentage | MEPs | Position | Political group |
|---|---|---|---|---|---|
| 2014 | 379,582 | 6.81% | 1 / 32 | 4th | Alliance of Liberals and Democrats for Europe (ALDE) |

=== Presidential elections ===
| Election | Affiliation | First round | | | Second round | | |
| Election | Affiliation | Votes | Percentage | Position | Votes | Percentage | Position |
|---|---|---|---|---|---|---|---|
| 2019 | "One Man" Alliance (Note: Diaconu ran as an independent candidate, supported by the "One Man" Alliance, with two constituent members: PRO Romania and ALDE.) | 815,201 | 8.85% | 4th | | | |

== Filmography ==
| Year | Title | Role | Director |
|---|---|---|---|
| 1972 | Stone Wedding | The Deserter | Dan Pița and Mircea Veroiu |
| 1975 | Philip the Good | Filip | Dan Pița |
| 1975 | Red Apples | Mitică Irod | Alexandru Tatos |
| 1975 | The Actor and the Savages | Commissioner Radu Toma | Manole Marcus |
| 1978 | The Prophet, the Gold and the Transylvanians | Romulus Brad | Dan Pița |
| 1978 | The Actress, the Dollars and the Transylvanians | Romulus Brad | Mircea Veroiu |
| 1981 | The Oil, the Baby and the Transylvanians | Romulus Brad | Dan Pița |
| 1981 | Carnival Scenes | Iordache | Lucian Pintilie |
| 1982 | Sequences | The Motel Keeper | Alexandru Tatos |
| 1982 | Bucharest Identity Card | Radu Petrescu | Virgil Calotescu |
| 1985 | Repeated Wedding | Radu Petrescu | Virgil Calotescu |
| 1988 | The Secret of the Secret Weapon | Zmeul Zmeilor | Alexandru Tatos |
| 1996 | Asphalt Tango | Andrei | Nae Caranfil |
| 2002 | Philanthropy | Ovidiu Gorea | Nae Caranfil |
| 2006 | Love Sick | Mr. Dragnea | Tudor Giurgiu |
| 2006 | The Way I Spent the End of the World | Grigore Matei | Cătălin Mitulescu |
| 2007 | The Bastards | The Presidential Counsellor | Șerban Marinescu |
| 2009 | Kino Caravan | Tanasie | Titus Muntean |

== Books ==
- Șugubina (1977), Editura Albatros
- La noi, când vine iarna (1980), Editura Ion Creangă; 2013, Editura Polirom
- Scaunul de pânză al actorului (1985), Editura Meridiane
