= Caranfil =

Caranfil is a surname. Notable people with the surname include:

- Gheorghe Caranfil, Romanian fencer
- Nae Caranfil (born 1960), Romanian film director and screenwriter
- Nicolae Caranfil, Romanian fencer
- Tudor Caranfil (1931–2019), Romanian film critic
