= Philanthropy (film) =

2002 Romanian black comedy film by Nae Caranfil

Filantropica
- Romanian theatrical release poster
- Directed by: Nae Caranfil
- Written by: Nae Caranfil
- Produced by: Cristian Comeagă; Antoine de Clermont-Tonnerre; Martine de Clermont-Tonnerre
- Starring: Mircea Diaconu; Gheorghe Dinică; Mara Nicolescu; Viorica Vodă; Florin Zamfirescu
- Cinematography: Vivi Drăgan Vasile
- Edited by: Thierry Derocles; Tiberiu Teodorescu
- Music by: Marius Mihalache
- Production companies: Domino Film; MACT Productions; MediaPro Pictures
- Distributed by: Swift (France)
- Release dates: 15 March 2002 (Romania); 5 June 2002 (France)
- Running time: 110 minutes
- Countries: Romania; France
- Language: Romanian

Filantropica (released internationally as Philanthropy and in France as Philanthropique) is a 2002 Romanian black comedy film written and directed by Nae Caranfil. Mircea Diaconu plays Ovidiu Gorea, a poorly paid Bucharest schoolteacher who ends up working for a begging ring run by a former convict, Pavel "Pepe" Puiuț, played by Gheorghe Dinică. Mara Nicolescu and Viorica Vodă, both in their first film roles, complete the main cast. The film is a co-production between Romania and France.

It was Caranfil's fourth feature. After a preview that opened the DaKINO festival in Bucharest, it reached Romanian cinemas on 15 March 2002 and French ones in June of the same year. The Romanian Filmmakers' Union (UCIN) gave it six awards, including its Grand Prize, and in 2002 it won prizes at festivals in Paris, Mons and Wiesbaden. Romania submitted it for the Academy Award for Best Foreign Language Film, but it was not nominated. With more than 113,000 admissions in Romania, it remains one of the most-seen Romanian films of its decade.

== Plot ==
An opening title describes a city whose inhabitants are divided into princes and beggars. Only the stray dogs live between the two worlds. They are the middle class.

Ovidiu Gorea teaches Romanian at a Bucharest high school and still lives with his parents. His first book of short stories has just come out and the bookshops will not stock it. The headmaster asks him to deal with a troublesome pupil, Robert Dobrovicescu. Instead of a parent, a strikingly pretty young woman turns up at the school. She says she is Robert's sister, Diana, and she appears in a toothpaste commercial. Ovidiu falls for her on the spot. Their first night out, a tour of bars and clubs, leaves him almost broke.

A drunken poet who begs at the Gara de Nord tells Ovidiu that he earns more than a teacher and sends him to the Filantropica Foundation. Behind the name is Pavel Puiuț, known as Pepe, an ex-convict who writes the stories and lines of the city's beggars. His rule is simple: a hand held out without a story gets no alms. Pepe thinks Ovidiu is the right man for a new idea. Ovidiu first refuses, then agrees, and Pepe pairs him with his secretary, Miruna. The two go to expensive restaurants as a poor teacher couple celebrating their wedding anniversary. When the bill comes they cannot pay, and Ovidiu puts on a rehearsed scene until some wealthy diner takes pity and settles it. The waiter is in on the scheme and the money is shared.

With his earnings Ovidiu courts Diana. He rents a convertible and takes her to the clubs by the lake. Diana finds out that his money is borrowed and drops him. Miruna, meanwhile, has fallen in love with him. When the pair try the act on their own in a karaoke bar, nobody hears them over the music, and a waiter who knows nothing about the arrangement beats Ovidiu up. Pepe turns the beating into another story. He sends the two of them to Florin Călinescu's television talk show, and the foundation opens a bank account for viewers who want to help.

Two debt collectors appear at the school demanding 3,000 dollars from Robert. Ovidiu withdraws the money from the foundation's account and gives it to Diana for her brother. Diana leaves town with the cash, and Robert admits that she was never his sister. Now in Pepe's debt, Ovidiu resigns himself to his part and to Miruna. In the final scene Pepe finds Robert on the street, recruits him into his ranks and turns to the camera.

== Cast ==
- Mircea Diaconu as Ovidiu Gorea, a teacher of Romanian
- Gheorghe Dinică as Pavel "Pepe" Puiuț, head of the Filantropica Foundation
- Mara Nicolescu as Miruna Stan, the foundation's secretary
- Viorica Vodă as Diana Dobrovicescu
- Cristian Gheorghe as Robert Dobrovicescu, Ovidiu's pupil
- Florin Zamfirescu as the poet of Gara de Nord
- Florin Călinescu as himself, host of Chestiunea zilei
- Monica Ghiuță as Mrs Gorea, Ovidiu's mother
- Constantin Drăgănescu as Mr Gorea, Ovidiu's father
- Dan Aștilean as Gigi Piedone, the beggars' overseer
- Marius Florea Vizante as Bulache Fotică, a rich kid
- Valentin Popescu as a debt collector
- Liviu Timuș as a debt collector
- Ovidiu Niculescu as Ruladă, a waiter at Le Petit Paris
- Constantin Chelba as Relu "the Baron"
- Lenuța Luțescu as Laura, the singer at Le Petit Paris
- Marius Rizea as Bucescu, Ovidiu's pupil
- Ion Albu as Gheorghe Stănete, a waiter at the karaoke bar
- Lupu Buznea as the lame beggar
- Mihaela Mitrache as Ovidiu's former teacher
- Gabriela Butuc as Vera, Ovidiu's former girlfriend
- Alexandru Mike Gheorghiu as Ovidiu as a teenager
- Mimi Brănescu
- Dragoș Moștenescu
- George Lungoci
- Ada Solomon as a dinner guest (credited as Adriana Solomon)
- Nae Caranfil as the karaoke singer
- Anamaria Marinca as a television reporter

Among the other credited actors are Ioan Georgescu, Carmen Ciorcilă, Ion Ștefan Claudiu, Cristian Rotaru, Gavril Pătru, Liviu Topuzu, Cristian Toma, Dragoș Stoica, Silviu Geamănu and Bogdan Talașman.

== Production ==
=== Screenplay ===
Caranfil has said that the script grew out of two ideas he had first tried separately. One came from a newspaper article about a real man called Pepe, who after a prison sentence had made a business of writing scripts for beggars. The other was an anecdote about a couple who celebrated ten years of marriage at a restaurant and were handed an enormous bill. Each idea had stalled on its own. Put together, they gave what the director called an explosive mix.

In an interview with Iulia Blaga a month before the release, Caranfil said that the film started from everyday life without copying it. He had done little research and worried that the story would seem implausible until a former classmate, by then a police officer, confirmed his hunches. Beggars, he said, come in several kinds, professionals and amateurs, and their money travels to different places. He had no wish to tell audiences whether or not to give money in the street. The story opens with "Once upon a time", and he described it as a sad, ironic and somewhat Brechtian comedy in the line of Mario Monicelli and Dino Risi. No representative of any authority appears in the film's world.

The screenplay was later published as a free e-book by Editura LiterNet, with an introduction by the critic Andrei Gorzo.

=== Casting ===
Caranfil said that he does not usually think of actors while writing, but Gheorghe Dinică was in his mind from the start, and the part of Pavel Puiuț was written for him. For Ovidiu he auditioned many actors, looking for a young Mircea Diaconu. In the end he went back to Diaconu himself, who had starred in his Asphalt Tango six years earlier. Mara Nicolescu, Viorica Vodă and Cristian Gheorghe were making their film debuts, and the director said he was proud of the parts he had given to lesser-known actors. Caranfil himself appears on screen as a lounge singer performing Frank Sinatra's "My Way" at a karaoke bar.

=== Financing and filming ===
The producers were Cristian Comeagă and Antoine de Clermont-Tonnerre. The film was made by Domino Film and MediaPro Pictures in Romania together with MACT Productions in France, which held a minority share. Romania's National Centre of Cinematography (CNC) and Canal+ took part, and the Council of Europe's Eurimages fund approved support in July 2000, at its board meeting in Budapest, under the scheme that weighs artistic value first. Two budget figures have been published. Agerpres gives 1.6 million dollars. The business weekly Capital wrote in October 2002 that the budget had been 15.61 billion old lei, above the 14 billion ceiling the CNC set for its competition, an exception allowed because the film was a co-production. A travel guide has called it the first Romanian fiction film to receive European money.

Shooting took place in Bucharest in September and October 2000, at Herăstrău Park, Victory Square and the Miguel de Cervantes high school, as well as at the Gara de Nord, the Carul cu Bere beer hall and on Lipscani street. Vivi Drăgan Vasile was the cinematographer. Mihnea Mihăilescu designed the sets and Svetlana Mihăilescu the costumes. Thierry Derocles and Tiberiu Teodorescu edited the film, and Marius Mihalache composed the score. The toothpaste commercial in which Diana appears, a parody of television advertising, was directed by Ovidiu Bose Paștină.

== Release ==
In 2001 the film opened the 11th DaKINO festival at the Sala Palatului in Bucharest. Irina Margareta Nistor counted more than 4,000 spectators and wrote that the hall reacted as if at the theatre. Iulia Blaga reported that the audience applauded the first appearances of Diaconu and Dinică and was taken aback when Caranfil turned up on screen. A Gypsy band played in the lobby as people left.

By the time of the release the film had already collected six awards from the Filmmakers' Union. For that reason Alex. Leo Șerban declined to present the premiere, although Caranfil had asked him to. He did not dispute the film's merits. Such awards, he wrote, normally come about a year after a release, and Filantropica was the first case he knew of a film reaching cinemas with its prizes already in hand. Introducing it would, in his view, have meant endorsing an abuse.

The premiere took place on 15 March 2002. At the press conference held that day at the Scala cinema, Caranfil said that he looked at the film's world with amusement and tenderness. Blaga noted that the release almost coincided with a teachers' strike.

The same year the film was shown at the first Transilvania International Film Festival in Cluj. Caranfil later said he had taken part in the festival's christening with Filantropica. In France it was released on 5 June 2002 as Philanthropique by Swift. Box Office Mojo records a French gross of 20,795 dollars. Unifrance and Cineuropa list a running time of 103 minutes, while goEast and other sources give 110.

In 2002 it competed at goEast in Wiesbaden, the festival of Central and Eastern European film, and was also shown in Paris, Mons and Thessaloniki. In 2005 it played at Belmont World Film in Boston.

In November 2007 the Thessaloniki International Film Festival included it in its Caranfil retrospective. The following year the Telluride Film Festival programmed a special screening of Filantropica and The Rest Is Silence in the director's honour. After Gheorghe Dinică's death in November 2009, the film was screened with Italian subtitles at the Accademia di Romania in Rome, at an evening dedicated to the actor. The Romanian Cultural Institute showed it in Budapest in 2009 and in London in 2010. In 2012 it was part of Romanian film weeks at the University of Michigan Museum of Art and the University of Granada, and in 2014 of a Romanian retrospective at the Tuškanac cinema in Zagreb. In 2013 Romania Insider noted that an English-subtitled edition was on sale in the Cărturești bookshops. The film is now in the catalogue of CinePub, a streaming platform for Romanian cinema.

== Reception ==
=== Box office ===
Romania's National Centre of Cinematography recorded 113,302 admissions in its tally to 31 December 2007, and 113,432 in the one dated 1 November 2025. By the figures published by Cinemagia it was the seventh most-seen release of 2002 in Romania, foreign films included. The year's top film was also Romanian, the comedy Garcea și oltenii, with 251,891 admissions. Among Caranfil's films only Asphalt Tango drew a larger audience, 126,974. The film critic Dana Duma wrote in 2013 that Filantropica had turned Caranfil into the favourite director of young Romanian audiences.

=== Critical response ===
Romanian reviews were largely favourable. In Libertatea, Alex. Leo Șerban praised the comic invention and the dialogue and remarked that, in a cinema given over to grim dramas, Caranfil found comedy where others saw only drama. The film, he concluded, at last reconciled audiences and critics. In Observator Cultural he placed it well above Asphalt Tango. He saw Caranfil as a follower of classical cinema, well-behaved but effective, and observed that the film dealt with the same mafia-ridden Romania as Cristi Puiu's Stuff and Dough, only in another key.

Andrei Gorzo, in Dilema, read it as a sad comedy about a world where pity and suffering had become merchandise. He thought it perhaps the most important of Caranfil's films and certainly the darkest, likened it to the comedies of Billy Wilder and wrote that few actors played honesty as convincingly as Mircea Diaconu. Diana, on the other hand, struck him as barely sketched. Iulia Blaga, in România Liberă, described a script written on two levels, one comic and one graver, and a wider world than in the director's earlier films, from the school to the literary milieu. At a first viewing the film had seemed to her more sombre than funny. At a second she laughed. She still wondered whether the director's amused detachment did not pass over the tragedy of the story. Irina Margareta Nistor found it very funny and singled out Diaconu, Dinică, Mara Nicolescu and Marius Florea Vizante, as well as the parodies of advertising and of Florin Călinescu's talk show. Her only reservation was that the film sometimes slid into black humour. Tudor Caranfil's film dictionary collects further Romanian notices, among them those of Eugenia Vodă, Cristian Tudor Popescu and Mircea Toma. Tudor Caranfil, the director's father, chose not to grade the film.

In France, the thirteen reviews collected by AlloCiné gave it an average of 3.6 out of 5. Le Parisien called it a pearl of black humour. Le Monde liked its biting tone but found the direction rather anonymous. Première enjoyed its incorrect spirit, with reservations about a somewhat laboured mise en scène, and Télérama thought the story had too many drawers. On the website Objectif Cinéma, Henri Lanoé compared it to the great Italian comedies but noted that the writing sometimes made situations and characters schematic. Variety wrote in July 2002 that many Hollywood screenwriters would envy the way Caranfil had built on his premise.

Writing for Romania Insider in 2013, Ioana Moldovan found few Romanian comedies so brilliantly written. Dominique Nasta describes the film as a devastating, hyperbolic black comedy about a Bucharest begging mafia thriving on emotional manipulation. Travel guides have called it a landmark of the Romanian New Wave, while film scholars tend to place Caranfil before that movement rather than within it. Doru Pop wrote in 2010 that some critics regard the author of Filantropica as the first "new waver", although Caranfil himself rejects the idea of such a wave. Duma contrasts his "maximalist" style with the minimalism of the younger directors and sees the scene in which Pepe casts his beggars as a subtly metacinematic moment.

In 2022 Flavia Dima rewatched the film for Films in Frame. She found it misogynistic and objectifying towards its female characters and argued that its treatment of poverty had played into the hands of those who blame people who fall through the social safety net. She nonetheless acknowledged it as a cultural phenomenon of Romania in the 2000s. When the Filmmakers' Union and the Romanian Film Critics' Association asked 40 critics to choose the best Romanian films in 2008, Filantropica gathered 30 points and did not make the top ten.

=== Accolades ===
Before the release the Filmmakers' Union gave the film its Grand Prize and five further awards. Caranfil took the screenplay prize, Mircea Diaconu and Mara Nicolescu the acting prizes and Svetlana Mihăilescu the prize for costumes, while Gheorghe Dinică received a special jury prize. In 2002 the audience of the Paris Film Festival gave it its prize, the Mons International Festival of Love Films awarded it the prize of its young European jury, and goEast its special jury prize. In 2003 came the audience award at the Würzburg International Filmweekend, a screenplay award at the Newport Beach Film Festival and a special jury prize in Bratislava, and in 2006 the TV5 prize for best francophone film at the Francophone Film Festival of Greece in Athens. The Romanian Film Critics' Association proposed the film for the Oscar pre-selection. The Academy accepted it as one of a record 54 entries for the Best Foreign Language Film award at the 75th Academy Awards, but it was not among the nominees.

Year	Award or festival	Category	Recipient	Result
2002	UCIN Awards	Grand Prize	Filantropica	Won
2002	UCIN Awards	Special Jury Prize	Gheorghe Dinică	Won
2002	UCIN Awards	Best Screenplay	Nae Caranfil	Won
2002	UCIN Awards	Best Actor	Mircea Diaconu	Won
2002	UCIN Awards	Best Actress	Mara Nicolescu	Won
2002	UCIN Awards	Best Production Design (costumes)	Svetlana Mihăilescu	Won
2002	Mons International Festival of Love Films	Young European Jury Award	Filantropica	Won
2002	Paris Film Festival	Audience Award	Filantropica	Won
2002	goEast, Wiesbaden	Special Jury Award	Filantropica	Won
2003	Würzburg International Filmweekend	Audience Award	Filantropica	Won
2003	Newport Beach Film Festival	Screenplay Award	Nae Caranfil	Won
2003	Film festival, Bratislava	Special Jury Prize	Filantropica	Won
2003	75th Academy Awards	Best Foreign Language Film	Filantropica (Romanian submission)	Submitted, not nominated
2006	Francophone Film Festival of Greece, Athens	TV5 Award for Best Francophone Film	Filantropica	Won

== Legacy ==
Pepe's line about the outstretched hand that tells no story has travelled beyond the film. Dana Duma quoted it in 2013, adding that Caranfil's admirers learn lines from his films by heart. Iulia Blaga saw in it an ars poetica valid for any artist. Flavia Dima noted, on the contrary, that the line had come to serve as an excuse for giving beggars nothing. In 2014 an Avocatnet article on the business of begging recalled it as the bold film that had taken on that taboo subject.

In 2014, eighty years after Gheorghe Dinică's birth, the Romanian Cultural Institute in Budapest revived the film in a series devoted to the actor. The Gopo Awards gala of 3 May 2022, at the National Theatre in Bucharest, marked twenty years since the release. Secvențe, the 1982 film by Alexandru Tatos, was celebrated the same evening. The film's team was invited on stage. Viorica Vodă spoke there about the sexual harassment she had suffered after the exposure brought by her first film role and urged younger colleagues not to keep silent. In an interview with Radio Free Europe after the gala, she said the role had mattered to her career "for better and for worse": the parts that followed were mostly of the same kind, and she was often mistaken for her character.

== See also ==
- List of submissions to the 75th Academy Awards for Best Foreign Language Film
- List of Romanian submissions for the Academy Award for Best International Feature Film
