= Șantaj =

1981 film by Geo Saizescu

- Directed by: Geo Saizescu
- Screenplay by: Rodica Ojog-Brașoveanu, Geo Saizescu
- Based on: Omul de la capătul firului by Rodica Ojog-Brașoveanu
- Produced by: Sanda Mănescu, Marin Theodorescu
- Cinematography: Mircea Rîbinschi
- Edited by: Margareta Anescu
- Music by: Temistocle Popa
- Production company: Casa de Filme Unu
- Distributed by: Româniafilm
- Release date: 23 February 1981
- Running time: 96 minutes
- Country: Romania
- Language: Romanian

Șantaj (Blackmail) is a Romanian film from 1981, screening of the novel Omul de la capătul firului by Rodica Ojog-Brașoveanu, directed by Geo Saizescu. The film stars Ileana Stana-Ionescu, Sebastian Papaiani, and Silviu Stănculescu in leading roles.

== Plot ==
A gang of forgers falsifying university degrees selects their clients from among young talented people, whom they help distinguish themselves, so that later, through blackmail, they can snatch their production secrets. However, Minerva Tutovan, a former math teacher turned major, manages to trick the gang, exposing their destructive tactics.

== Full cast ==
- Ileana Stana-Ionescu – Major Minerva Tutovan, a former math teacher
- Sebastian Papaiani – Lieutenant Vasile "Basil" Dobrescu, former student of Minerva
- Silviu Stănculescu – Coroner Vlase
- Ioana Bulcă – Maria Dumitrescu, engineer
- Enikő Szilágyi – Dora Ioachim, model
- Ion Besoiu – Grigore Dincă, artisan making knicknacks
- Octavian Cotescu – Dumitru Necula, actor
- Mircea Șeptilici – Dem Luca, translator
- Amza Pellea – Colonel of the Miliția
- Cristian Ștefănescu – Cristian, undercover officer of the Miliția
- Sorin Ștefănescu-Medeleni – Toacșe, undercover officer of the Miliția
- Tănase Cazimir – O. Ganea, math teacher
- Costel Constantin – Mihai Pascu, engineer
- Cornel Gîrbea – Anton, recidivist murderer
- Valentin Plătăreanu – Mircea Mihăilă, engineer
- Vladimir Găitan – prosecutor
- Liana Ceterchi – Dobrescu's girlfriend
- Traian Dănceanu – General of the Miliția
- Geo Saizescu – Simeon Cătănoiu, witness to the first murder
- Tamara Buciuceanu-Botez - Mrs. Cătănoiu, Simeon's wife
- Dem Rădulescu – officer of the Miliția
- Vali Voiculescu-Pepino
- Mitzura Arghezi
- Adriana Șchiopu – daughter of the math teacher
- Marius Pepino
- Stelian Preda
- Valentin Teodosiu – Pricop, engineer
- Ovidiu Georgescu
- Nae Lăzărescu – math tutor
- Mihai Perșa
- Alexandru Lazăr
- Mircea Mușatescu
- Vasile Popa – undercover officer of the Miliția
- Dan Ivănescu
- Ion Enache
