= Monalisa Basarab =

Romanian actress

- Born: April 23, 1972 (age 53); Tulcea, Romania
- Occupation: actress
- Years active: 1995 - present

Monalisa Basarab (born 23 April 1972, Tulcea) is a Romanian theater and film actress.

== Biography ==
She graduated in 1995 from Babeș-Bolyai University of Cluj-Napoca, Faculty of Theater and Television, acting specialization, in the class of professor Sorana Coroamă-Stanca. Monalisa Basarab made her debut in 1995 on the stage of the Oradea State Theater where she had various roles until 1998. From 2000 to 2002 he was part of the Nottara Theater troupe. She has been an actress at the Constantin Tănase Magazine Theater in Bucharest since 2002.

Among the roles played in the theater are: the daughter of the colonel Afară în fața ușii by Wolfgang Borchert, directed by Sergiu Savin; The Young Woman in Frumos e în septembrie la Veneția by Teodor Mazilu, directed by Nicolae Scarlat, as well as characters from Idolii femeilor, directed by Bițu Fălticineanu.

He made his film debut in 1999 in the ZDF/ARTE/Ifage Wiesbaden episode "Nostradamus-Prophet des Untergangs" in the documentary TV series Sphinx-Geheimnisse der Geschichte, directed by Klein Günther, in which he played Nostradamus' wife.

He appeared in international co-productions in the pilot episode of the action TV series Élodie Bradford in which he starred opposite Anthony Delon; as Princess de Galathionne in the TV movie directed by Lionel Bailliu, Moș Goriot (Le Père Goriot) after the novel of the same name by Honoré de Balzac, as Severine Faussait in the 2003 episode directed by Laurent Carcélès, "Corps et Âmes", Vertiges

In The Way I Spent the End of the World directed by Cătălin Mitulescu, a film that participated in the Cannes Film Festival and won the award in the Un Certain Regard section for the best actress (Dorotheea Petre), played the teacher lualalilu, the main character.

The poet Ilie Marinescu launched the volume of poems Muguri de stele at Proxima publishing house in 2007, a volume accompanied by a audiobook on CD that includes the poems in the volume in the reading of the actors Monalisa Basarab, Ion Lucian, Paula Sorescu Lucian, George Mihăiță, Adriana Trandafir and the author of the book.
