= The Way I Spent the End of the World =

Cum mi-am petrecut sfârșitul lumii
- Film poster showing Dorotheea Petre as Eva and Timotei Duma as her brother Lilu
- Romanian: Cum mi-am petrecut sfârșitul lumii
- Directed by: Cătălin Mitulescu
- Written by: Cătălin Mitulescu and Andreea Valean
- Produced by: Cătălin Mitulescu, In-Ah Lee, Philippe Martin, Daniel Mitulescu, Andrew J.Schorr, David Thion
- Starring: Dorotheea Petre and Timotei Duma
- Cinematography: Marius Panduru
- Edited by: Cristina Ionescu
- Music by: Alexandru Bălănescu
- Distributed by: Metropolis Film (Romania), Pyramide Distribution (International)
- Release date: 2006
- Running time: 110 minutes
- Country: Romania
- Language: Romanian

The Way I Spent the End of the World (Romanian: Cum mi-am petrecut sfârșitul lumii) is the feature-length film debut of Romanian director Cătălin Mitulescu. It was released on September 15, 2006.

== Synopsis ==
The film is about 17-year-old Eva and 7-year-old Lilu, siblings living in Bucharest, Romania during the final years of the regime of Nicolae Ceaușescu. After Eva is expelled from her high school for her uncooperative attitude, she is sent to a technical school where she meets Andrei, with whom she plans to escape by swimming across the Danube into Yugoslavia and then relocating to Italy. Lilu and his friends volunteer for a choir scheduled to perform for Ceaușescu, hoping this will give them a chance to assassinate him.

== Cast and characters ==
=== The Matei family ===
- Dorotheea Petre as Eva Matei
- Timotei Duma as Lalalilu Matei
- Carmen Ungureanu as Maria Matei
- Mircea Diaconu as Grigore Matei
- Jean Constantin as Uncle Florică

=== Lilu's friends ===
- Valentino Marius Stan as Tarzan
- Marian Stoica as Silvică

=== Eva's friends ===
- Cristian Văraru as Andrei, Eva's friend
- Ionuț Becheru as Alexandru Vomică, Eva's boyfriend

=== Others ===
- Valentin Popescu as the music teacher
- Grigore Gonta as Ceaușică
- Florin Zamfirescu as the school director
- Monalisa Basarab as choir teacher
- Corneliu Țigancu as Bulba
- Nicolae Enache Praida as Titi

== Awards ==
- Dorotheea Petre - Premiul de interpretare feminină (Female actor award)
- Dorotheea Petre - Un Certain Regard Award for Best Actress, 2006 Cannes Film Festival

== Alternative titles ==
- Comment j'ai fêté la fin du monde (French title)
- How I Celebrated the End of the World (alternative translation)

== See also ==
- Romanian New Wave
- List of submissions to the 79th Academy Awards for Best Foreign Language Film
- List of Romanian submissions for the Academy Award for Best Foreign Language Film
