= Negreanu =

Negreanu is a surname. Notable people with the surname include:

- Daniel Negreanu (born 1974), Canadian poker player
- Dinu Negreanu (1917–2001), Romanian film director
- Elena Negreanu (1918–2016), Romanian Jewish actress, graphic designer, and director
