= Rodica Ojog-Brașoveanu =

Romanian writer (1939–2002)

- Born: Angela Rodica Ojog; August 28, 1939; Bucharest, Kingdom of Romania
- Died: September 2, 2002 (aged 63); Bucharest, Romania
- Occupations: Writer; screenwriter; lawyer
- Years active: 1969–2002

Rodica Ojog-Brașoveanu (28 August 1939 – 2 December 2002) was a Romanian writer. She was dubbed the "Agatha Christie of Romania", her works consisting mainly of detective novels and short stories.

== Biography ==
Daughter of Ana and Victor Ojog, she was born into a family of wealthy intellectuals. Her mother was a teacher, while her father was a lawyer and member of the National Liberal Party.

Enrolled at the age of six at the "La Maison du Français", Ojog-Brașoveanu acquired an affinity for the French language, which she would remain profoundly attached to for the rest of her life.

She started her secondary education in 1948 at the "Domnița Ileana" High School (now known as the Mihai Eminescu National College), and upon graduating went on to study Law at the University of Bucharest. However, in 1956, she was expelled and arrested on a political basis, accused of supporting the anti-communist revolt in Budapest. She would only be readmitted in 1962, following a year of unqualified work in a factory. In 1963, she married actor Cosma Brașoveanu and resumed her Law studies, this time at the University of Iași; she completed her law degree in 1967, at the University of Bucharest. From 1968, she began working as a lawyer.

Ojog-Brașoveanu died in 2002, as a result of severe lung problems.

== Works ==
=== Novels ===
After her debut in 1969 with a television scenario, Ojog-Brașoveanu started writing on her husband's demands. Her first detective novel, Moartea semnează indescifrabil (Death Has an Indecipherable Signature), was published in 1971 at the Albatros Publishing House. Following the success of this novel, Ojog-Brașoveanu decided to quit her job as a lawyer and dedicate herself completely to writing.

Her works are much appreciated for their humor, irony and atypical characters, and in particular, her fine and amusing descriptions of the Romanian society (regardless of the time of action), as well as the alert pace of her narrative.

Her novel Cianură pentru un surâs (Cyanide for a Smile) has been translated into Bulgarian.

=== Famous characters ===
Ojog-Brașoveanu's most well-known character is undoubtedly Melania Lupu, a mischievous old lady, half-detective half-criminal, to whom the author gives an unusual confidant – her cat, Mirciulică. Her other well-known character is Minerva Tutovan, a former math teacher turned commissioner, particularly rigorous in her investigations and with a remarkable talent for disguises. She has her dog Spiridon as a companion, but works especially with the young inspector Dobrescu, who is also one of her former students.

== Influences ==
Ojog-Brașoveanu's favourite authors include Edgar Wallace, Georges Simenon, Karl May, and among Romanian ones, Theodor Constantin and Haralamb Zincă. Critics dubbed her the "Agatha Christie of Romania", with the British novelist being one of her most obvious sources of inspiration for her books. In addition, like the British author, Ojog-Brasoveanu was able to live on just her writings throughout her life, her novels selling in tremendous numbers.

== Bibliography ==
=== Detective novels ===
- 1971 – Moartea semnează indescifrabil (Death Has an Indecipherable Signature)
- 1971 – Enigmă la mansardă (Enigma in the Attic)
- 1973 – Cocoșatul are alibi (The Hunchback has an Alibi)
- 1977 – Anchetă în infern (Investigation in the Inferno)
- 1981 – Ștafeta, reissued in 1999 under the title O bombă pentru revelion (A Bomb for New Year's Eve)
- 1983 – Întâlnire la "Elizeu", reissued in 2004 under the title Întâlnire la Élysée (Meeting at Élysée)
- 1985 – Apel din necunoscut (Call from the Unknown)
- 1991 – Crimă prin mica publicitate (Crime through Classified Advertising)
- 1992 – Coșmar (Nightmare)
- 1994 – Cutia cu nasturi (The Box of Buttons)
- 1998 – Poveste imorală (Immoral Story)
- 1998 – Un blestem cu domiciliul stabil (A Curse with a Stable Address)
- 1999 – Telefonul din bikini (The telephone in the Bikini)
- 2001 – Răzbunarea sluților (Revenge of the Disfigured)
- 2002 – Necunoscuta din congelator (The Unknown Body in the Freezer)

==== Minerva Tutovan series ====
- 1972 – Spionaj la mănăstire (Espionage at the Monastery)
- 1973 – Omul de la capătul firului (The Man at the End of the Line)
- 1974 – Minerva se dezlănțuie (Minerva goes wild)
- 1974 – Plan diabolic (Diabolical Plan)
- 1977 – Panică la căsuța cu zorele, reissued in 1999 under the title Stilet cu șampanie (Champagne Stiletto)
- 1982 – Nopți albe pentru Minerva (Sleepless Nights for Minerva)
- 1986 – Violeta din safe (The Violet in the Safe)

==== Melania Lupu series ====
- 1975 – Cianură pentru un surâs (Cyanide for a Smile)
- 1975 – Bună seara, Melania! (Good evening, Melania!)
- 1979 – 320 de pisici negre (320 Black Cats)
- 1984 – Anonima de miercuri (The Wednesday Anonymous)
- 1990 – Melania și misterul din parc, reissued in 2004 as Dispariția statuii din parc (The Disappearance of the Park Statue)
- 1992 – O crimă à la Liz Taylor, reissued in 2000 as O toaletă à la Liz Taylor (Grooming à la Liz Taylor)

=== Historical novels ===
- 1978 – Al cincilea as (The Fifth Ace)
- 1983 – Întâlnire la „Elizeu", reissued in 2004 under the title Întâlnire la Élysée (Meeting at Élysée)
- 1990 – A înflorit liliacul (The Lilac has Blossomed)
- 1990 – Să nu ne uităm la ceas (Let's Not Check the Time)

==== Logothete Andronic series ====
- 1976 – Agentul secret al lui Altîn-Bey (The Secret Agent of Altin-Bey)
- 1978 – Logofătul de taină (The Secret Logothete)
- 1980 – Ochii jupâniței (The Noblewoman's Eyes)
- 1981 – Letopisețul de argint (The Silver Chronicle)
- 1988 – Vulturul dincolo de Cornul Lunii (The Eagle Beyond the Horn of the Moon)

=== Short story collections ===
- 2000 – Grasă și proastă (Fat and Dumb)
- 2000 – Bărbații sunt niște porci (Men are Pigs)

=== Theatre plays ===
- 1984 – Cursa de Viena (The Journey to Vienna)

=== Scenarios and TV adaptations ===
- 1969 – Crima din Cișmigiu (Murder in Cișmigiu)
- 1981 – Șantaj (Blackmail), screening of the novel Omul de la capătul firului
- 1984 – A doua variantă (The Second Option)
- 1995–1996 – Douăsprezece (Twelve), twelve scenarios
- 1996 – Enigma (The Enigma)
- 1998 – Poveste imorală (Immoral Story), series based on the novel of the same name

== See also ==
- List of crime writers
- List of mystery writers
- List of Romanian writers
