= Philanthropy (disambiguation) =

Philanthropy is the love of humanity.

It may also refer to:

- Philanthropy (magazine)
- Philanthropy (film), 2002 Romanian film
