= Elena Albu =

Romanian actress

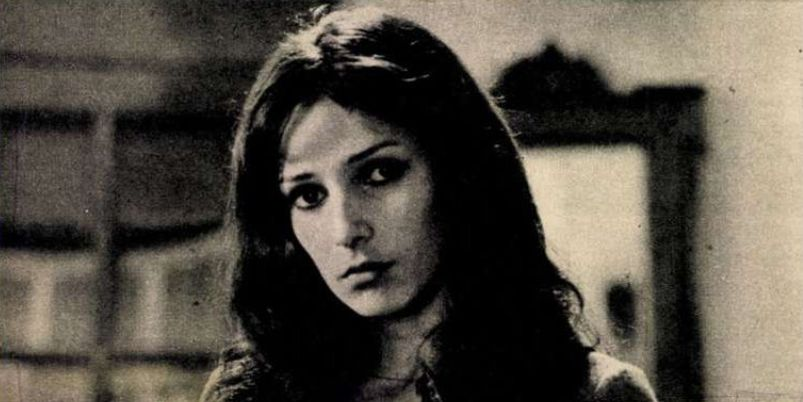
- Born: Elena Albu; 1 September 1949; Iași, Romania
- Died: 16 March 2003 (aged 53); Bucharest Romania
- Education: Caragiale Academy of Theatrical Arts and Cinematography
- Occupations: Stage actress; film actress
- Spouse: Mircea Veroiu

Elena Albu (September 1, 1949 – March 16, 2003) was a Romanian stage and film actress.

She graduated from Caragiale Academy of Theatrical Arts and Cinematography in 1973.

Her acting career began in 1982; she starred in many productions directed by her husband Mircea Veroiu.

Her last theatrical role was in Oameni de zăpadă ("Snowmen"), directed by Louise Dănceanu at Bucharest's Teatrul Foarte Mic in the 1998–1999 season.

She died alone at her home, 16 March 2003, victim of a cerebral hemorrhage caused by arterial hypertension.

== Filmography ==
- Apachen (1973)
- Ilustrate cu flori de câmp (1974)
- Prin cenușa imperiului (1976)
- Între oglinzi paralele (1978)
- Falansterul (1979)
- Detașamentul Concordia (1980)
- Moara lui Călifar (1984)
- Surorile (1984)
- Somnul insulei (1994)
- Femeia în roșu (1997)

== See also ==
- List of Romanian actresses
