= Dan Mizrahi =

Romanian pianist (1926–2010)

Dan Mizrahi Dan Mizrahy
- Born: February 28, 1926; Bucharest, Kingdom of Romania
- Died: February 25, 2010 (aged 83) Bucharest, Romania
- Genres: Orchestral
- Occupations: Composer, musician
- Years active: 1954–2010

Dan Mizrahi (also spelled Dan Mizrahy; February 28, 1926 – February 25, 2010) was a Romanian-Jewish pianist.

== Early life and education ==
Mizrahi was born in Bucharest to Moscu Mizrahi, a descendant of an old Sephardic Jewish family, and his wife Henrietta Schoenfield, an Ashkenazi Jew. His paternal grandparents Avram Mizrahi and Lucia Sara, were watchmakers born in Varna who settled in Bucharest. Moscu was a veteran of the Romanian army in World War I. Mirazhi studied piano from the age of 4. When he was 9, he entered the Academy of Music in Bucharest as a student of Aurelia Cionca. Among his teachers were Mihail Andricu and Faust Nicolescu.

In 1941, he was expelled from Romania as a result of antisemitic legislation in WWII. In March 1941, he left at the age of 15 with only a backpack and immigrated to Palestine, where he was assigned to work in gardening. At a celebration at the agricultural school he attended, he began playing accordion and was later admitted to the Academy of Music in Jerusalem, where he studied piano, pedagogy, and music theory. He graduated in 1944 and took the exams for the British baccalaureate in 1945.

In autumn of 1945, following the end of WWII, Mizrahi returned to Romania, where he finished his studies at the Academy of Bucharest, graduating in 1948. He worked on private compositions with Mihail Jora. In 1946, he began a solo career, and became a piano teacher in 1949 at Dinu Lipatti High School. During the Communist Regime, from 1951 to 1953, he was arrested in order to be reeducated. He was held in custody for 3 years, and spent over 400 days in cells located underground. He was released and eventually continued his musical career on January 30, 1954, while playing under composer Sergiu Comissiona. At the end of 1954, he began singing with works by George Gershwin.

== Career and death ==
Mizrahi was an honorary member of the Union of Performers, Choreographers, and Music Critics. In 1997, he was the holder of the Mihail Jora Music Critics Award. He was also a member of the Union of Composers and Musicologists. Starting in the 60s, he began composing vocal music, for which he was awarded the title of laureate 9 different times at the Golden Chrysanthemum National Romance Festival. Additionally, he is a recipient of the Order of Cultural Merit.

In 1968, the Romanian National Opera organized a Gershwin ballet evening, during which Mizrahi performed the solo from Three Preludes and Rhapsody in Blue. In 1997 and 1998, he underwent a concert lecture tour of colleges in the United States. In his long career, Mizrahi played his famous rendition of Rhapsody in Blue in the orchestra format nearly 200 times, and the Concert in F over 100 times. In 2005, he released his autobiographical book, "Așa a fost"

Mizrahi died on February 25, 2010. He was interred the following day that the Bucharest Sephardic Jewish Cemetery.
