= The Rest Is Silence (2007 film) =

2007 film by Nae Caranfil

- Directed by: Nae Caranfil
- Starring: Marius Florea Vizante; Ovidiu Niculescu; Mirela Zeta
- Release dates: June 9, 2007 (Transilvania International Film Festival); March 7, 2008 (Romania)
- Running time: 114 minutes
- Country: Romania
- Languages: Romanian; French

The Rest Is Silence (Romanian: Restul e tăcere) is a 2007 Romanian comedy-drama film directed by Nae Caranfil. It was Romania's official submission for the 2009 Academy Award for Best Foreign Language Film.

The film had a budget of over two million euros and tells the story of the first feature film in Romanian history.

The film was the most expensive Romanian film to date.

== Cast ==
- Marius Florea Vizante - Grigore 'Grig' Ursache
- Ovidiu Niculescu - Leon Negrescu
- Mirela Zeta - Emilia
- Mihai Gruia Sandu - Iancu Ursache
- Valentin Popescu - Catargiu
- Nicu Mihoc - Anton Vorbula
- Gavril Patru - The Cameraman
- Silviu Biris - Raoul
- Vlad Zamfirescu - Nutu Ferefide
- Samuel Tastet - Raymond Duffin
- Florin Zamfirescu - Colonel Guta - Chief of Police
- Alexandru Hasnas - King Carol I
- Ioana Bulcă - Aristizza
- Mihai Bendeac - reporter of the newspaper Epoca
