= Alexandru Mandy =

Romanian composer (1914–2005)

- Born: Armand Abram Penchas; August 9, 1914; Craiova, Kingdom of Romania
- Died: October 10, 2005 (aged 91) Bucharest, Romania
- Occupation: Composer
- Years active: 1966–2000

Alexandru Mandy (né Armand Abram Penchas; August 9, 1914 – October 10, 2005) was a Romanian Jewish composer.

== Career ==
Mandy began his first major compositional debut with his Song of the Wind. He often wrote lyrics to preexisting instrumental music, but a majority of his songs consisted of completely original compositions. His soundtrack was sung by Mihaela Mihai and Sergiu Cioiu.

He was heavily inspired by Romanian artist Constantin Brâncuși. When he was 20, he first discovered Brâncuși's work at a meeting of poet Elena Farago. Many of his pieces, such as the Infinity Column (song), Table of silence (song), Gate of the kiss (song), and Majesty found their way to be memorialized in Mandy's songs. A lot of his work was also influenced by his pride in his homeland of Romania. In 1966, he composed Your Voice, a tribute to Maria Tănase. Additionally, he performed other pieces influenced by traditional Romanian culture such as Cânt pentru bradul meu (I sing for my tree) and Un grai, o vatră, un isvor (A voice, a hearth, a spring). His piece, Ierusalim, is a tribute to the victims of the Munich Olympic massacre victims.

In 1966, at the Mamaia National Light Music Festival, he received the Seaside Award for The Song of the Wind. Mihai's renditions of The endless column and Under a patch of sky won Mandy the prize of the Union of Romanian Composers and Musicologists.

== Personal life ==
Mandy studied at the Faculty of Pharmacy in Bucharest for his tertiary education. Like all Jews of the time in Romania, he was required to wear the Yellow Star of Jude, and primarily focused on work. He was deported to Transnistria in the 1940s during the second half of World War II, and after returning to Romania, became the director of studies at the Caragiale National University of Theatre and Film for the years between 1950 and 1952.

He died in 2005 in a retirement home at Jimbolia. He was buried at the Bucharest Sephardic Jewish Cemetery.
