= The Actress, the Dollars and the Transylvanians =

1979 film

- Directed by: Mircea Veroiu
- Written by: Titus Popovici
- Starring: Ilarion Ciobanu, Mircea Diaconu, Ovidiu Iuliu Moldovan
- Cinematography: Călin Ghibu
- Edited by: Yolanda Mîntulescu, Mircea Ciociltei
- Music by: Adrian Enescu
- Production companies: Casa de Filme Trei, Centrul de Producţie Cinematografica București
- Distributed by: Romana Film
- Release date: 1979
- Running time: 72 minutes
- Country: Romania
- Languages: Romanian, English

The Actress, the Dollars and the Transylvanians (Artista, dolarii şi ardelenii in Romanian) is a 1979 Romanian film directed by Mircea Veroiu and scripted by Titus Popovici. It is the second in a Red Western trilogy that also comprises The Prophet, the Gold and the Transylvanians and The Oil, the Baby and the Transylvanians. American characters speak in English and the Romanian ones in Romanian.

== Plot ==
A train carrying passengers and money is ambushed by Indians. The passengers realize that the "Indians" are disguised bandits and the bandits murder them all. The bandit boss was travelling in the train and steals the uniform off the corpse of a Colonel Wilkinson to impersonate him. Meanwhile, the scene is observed by real Indians. The Indians are also found by the Brad family, Transylvanian immigrants attempting to make a living in the Wild West. As seen in the first film of the series they are:

- Traian Brad (Ilarion Ciobanu), the elder brother.
- Johnny Brad (Ovidiu Iuliu Moldovan), a gunfighter who arrived first to America.
- Romulus "Romi" Brad (Mircea Diaconu), the younger brother.

They are accompanied by Bob (Ahmed Gabbany), a former black slave who by now speaks some Romanian, and June (Tania Filip), an orphan girl rescued by Johnny and engaged to Romi.

The Brads arrive in a town and get a room in the Grand Hotel de Paris. Johnny gets into a bar brawl at the saloon with Mr Green (Előd Kiss) and Traian confiscates his gun. In the town, a circus troupe has a show including a sharpshooter and Anabelle Lee (Rodica Tapalagă) "from Paris", an actress and singer. Traian and Bob watch the show and Traian falls in love with her. The show is interrupted by the news that the Indians have attacked the train. A posse is formed and finds the passengers massacred and scalped.

Traian changes his clothes of Transylvanian shepherd for an elegant suit and courts Anabelle with Bob as a translator. However Anabelle and the troupe are part of the bandits and she is the lover of the false colonel. Realizing that the Indians were not involved in the train assault, a scout goes to their camp. He convinces chief Black Falcon and his son Fast Arrow (Constantin Brînzea) to go to town to clear the accusation. Upon arrival, the three are shot by the bandits and the misled townsfolk. Fast Arrow escapes and ends in the Brads's room, who offer him refuge. Romi, who is working as a blacksmith apprentice, goes to the circus camp and tells Anabelle in broken English to stop seeing Traian, but June is abused by Green while Romi cannot defend her.

Before the troupe leaves to assault another train, Anabelle charms Traian and the bank manager (Ion Henter) into opening for her the bank safe. She and his lover then rob the bank. Encouraged by Fast Arrow, Johnny takes his gun and convince the sheriff (Mihai Oroveanu) that the troupe are the bandits. A gunfight ensues and ends with the defeat of the artists, the capture of Anabelle and the death of the Colonel. The Brads leave among the congratulations of the townsfolk.

== Soundtrack ==
Unusually for a Western, the soundtrack by Adrian Enescu features synthesizers.
