= The Actor and the Savages =

1975 film

- Directed by: Manole Marcus
- Written by: Titus Popovici
- Starring: Toma Caragiu
- Cinematography: Nicu Stan
- Music by: George Grigoriu
- Release date: July 1975
- Running time: 150 minutes
- Country: Romania
- Language: Romanian

The Actor and the Savages (Romanian: Actorul și sălbaticii) is a 1975 Romanian drama film directed by Manole Marcus. Inspired by the life of actor Constantin Tănase, it stars Toma Caragiu. It was entered into the 9th Moscow International Film Festival.

== Cast ==
- Toma Caragiu as Costică Caratase
- Mircea Albulescu as Ionel Fridman
- Tricy Abramovici as Negreasca
- Margareta Pogonat as Elvira Caratase
- Zephi Alșec as Minister of Interior
- George Paul Avram as Puiu Mugur
- Ferenc Bencze as Peasant
- Marin Moraru as Vasilică
- Carmen Berbecaru as Marioara
- Ion Besoiu as Guță Popescu
- Maria Chira as Caratase's Daughter
- Cornel Ciupercescu as Legionnaire
- Ovidiu Iuliu Moldovan as Legionnaire
- Constantin Drăgănescu as Legionnaire
- Mircea Veroiu as Legionnaire
- Mircea Diaconu as Commissioner Radu Toma
- Gheorghe Șimonca as King Carol II
- Florin Zamfirescu as Ghiță Gherdan
- Ioana Crăciunescu as Student
- Ștefan Thury as George, the choreographer

== Production ==
The movie scenario was written by Titus Popovici and it first name was "Actor, policeman and...savages". As the actors who played in the movie recall, the main role was written for Toma Caragiu. When the movie director and production company finalized the "ideological and artistic conception", the scenario was approved by the State Committee on Culture and the Arts on 8 March 1974.

On March 16, 1974, the film entered into the production phase. The film shooting took place from 3 June to 17 September 1974. In 65 days of movie shooting, the team worked over 10 hours per day. On 4 April 1975, Dumitru Popescu watched the movie and the re-montage and texts inputs were required. On 21 April 1975, the standard copy was finished. On 26 December 1974, the standard copy was finalized. Production costs amounted to 4,850,000 leis.

There were a number of mix-ups during the filming. In one scene, Caratase finds in his bed a cut-off hand left by the Legionnaires to frighten him. In the scene the real hand was used, the hand was brought from the morgue. The next day it was thrown out into the garbage bin and then, someone found it. The investigation was started but then stopped, when it was revealed that this is the garbage left the after the movie shooting. The gun used in the movie by the Commissioner Radu Toma was a real one. The gun was given to the actor Mircea Diaconu, by the Capitan of the security services, only for the moment when the related scene was shot and after that he took it back. The Capitan of the security service refused to leave the gun to the actor before the scene, so that the actor could have a bit of practice with it.

When Caratase is saying his final monologue, the actor is disguised as Hitler and is satirizing the fascist spirit, and then, he is taken backstage. According to the scenario, the main character has to die in bed, but Toma Caragiu insisted that main character should die "standing." For the first time in Socialist Romania, a Romanian king appeared in the movie; Sergiu Nicolaescu found this insulting.

The music for the movie was composed by George Grigoriu and includes 57 minutes of original music, arrangements and musical "fantasies". The lyrics were written by Ion Vasilescu and Mișu Iancu, the songs being played by Carmen Berbecaru and Tricy Abramovici. The Funny Couplets were written by Dan Mihăescu and Grigore Pop.
