= Closer to the Moon =

2013 film by Nae Caranfil

- Theatrical release poster
- Directed by: Nae Caranfil
- Written by: Nae Caranfil
- Produced by: Michael Fitzgerald; Denis Friedman; Alessandro Leone; Bobby Păunescu; Renata Rainieri
- Starring: Vera Farmiga; Mark Strong; Harry Lloyd
- Cinematography: Marius Panduru
- Edited by: Larry Madaras; Roberto Silvi
- Music by: Laurent Couson
- Production companies: Mandragora Movies; Agresywna Banda
- Distributed by: Mandragora Movies; Sundance Selects
- Release dates: November 29, 2013 (New Romanian Cinema Festival); March 7, 2014 (Romania); April 17, 2015 (United States)
- Running time: 112 minutes
- Countries: Romania; United States
- Language: English
- Budget: $5 million
- Box office: $5,396

Closer to the Moon (Romanian: Mai aproape de lună) is a 2013 comedy-drama film written and directed by Nae Caranfil, and starring Vera Farmiga, Mark Strong, Harry Lloyd, Joe Armstrong, Tim Plester, Christian McKay and Anton Lesser. Based on the true story of the Ioanid Gang, it is one of the most expensive productions in Romanian cinema.

It had its world premiere at the "Making Waves: New Romanian Cinema Festival" at the Lincoln Center, on November 29, 2013. The film was released in Romania on March 7, 2014, and was given a limited release in the United States on April 17, 2015, by Sundance Selects.

== Plot ==
Post-war Communist Romania: In 1959 Bucharest, members of Romania's high society Max Rosenthal, Alice Bercovici, Dumi Dorneanu, Răzvan Orodel and Iorgu Ristea, known collectively as Ioanid Gang, announce to a crowd that they are shooting a film. A young café worker, Virgil, is among the witnesses. Under the guise of making this film, the Ioanid Gang perform a heist of the National Bank of Romania. The following day, Virgil loiters around a film set and encounters the director, Flaviu, who requests him to buy vodka and give it to him whenever he asks.

Eight months before the heist took place, Max, Dumi, Iorgu and Răzvan, heroes of the resistance during World War II, celebrate New Year's Eve and the start of 1959. Max is divorcing his wife, Sonia. Alice returns from Moscow with her and Max's son, Mirel, in tow. She re-introduces Mirel to his father, and they begin to bond.

One night, the Gang celebrates Dumi's birthday and reminisce about their early lives as revolutionaries. For fun, they plot the heist, in order to rile up anti-Communist Romania, but then realize that Max is taking their conversation seriously. He convinces Dumi, Iorgu and Răzvan to join him, but Alice says no as she has to raise Mirel. She changes her mind, however, when she learns that Mirel wants to join as the fifth person. Alice becomes enraged during the robbery when she sees Mirel filming it. After a couple of months, Iorgu unintentionally implicates himself, and the group is individually located and arrested by Comrade Holban and his police officers. Their arrests happen on the same day as the Luna 2 landing on the Moon.

One year later, Virgil is an experienced camera assistant. He is called in by his boss, who informs him of a short film about to start production. Virgil is assigned to record it. It is then revealed that the film is a propaganda piece about the Ioanid Gang's crime. The group, who have been convicted and are awaiting their execution, are ordered by the Securitate to star in the film. Later, Virgil informs Flaviu that he was present during the robbery and its danger has been greatly exaggerated by the authorities. When the Gang arrive for filming, Alice begins to bond with Virgil. When Flaviu gets drunk and passes out, Max takes over directing. While setting up a shot, he secretly gives Virgil contact details for the Gang's loved ones, requesting he contact them to let them know the group is alive and in prison. Later, Virgil makes an anonymous call to the first person on the list, and continues to do so with the help of his landlord, Moritz.

One night, Virgil is taken to Holban's house. Holban reveals that he knows Virgil has been doing favours for the Gang and asks him to keep doing so, in order to win their trust. He asks Virgil to find the sixth member of the group, Alice's son, as the Gang will be executed soon. During a commotion on set one day, Alice slips away. Virgil follows her to a house, where she says goodbye to her son. Afterwards, they have dinner at Virgil's house and sleep together. The next morning, Alice surrenders to the guards keeping surveillance outside, and leaves Virgil with sealed instructions. Virgil is approached by Holban and asked to write the address of Mirel, but he feigns unawareness.

Max's ex-brother-in-law arrives and relieves Holban of duty, due to negligence and exhaustion. Max asks him to send the Gang into space instead of executing them, but he angrily retorts that astronauts should be heroes and not traitors. Alice's letter asks Virgil to organize Mirel's Bar Mitzvah, which he does. Iorgu, Dumi, Răzvan and Max are sent before the firing squad. In voiceover, Alice says that, at the last moment, her sentence was changed to life imprisonment because she had fallen pregnant. The audience is then told that Alice emigrated to Israel with Mirel and her daughter.

== Cast ==
- Vera Farmiga as Alice Bercovici
- Mark Strong as Max Rosenthal
- Harry Lloyd as Virgil
- Anton Lesser as Comrade Holban
- Christian McKay as Iorgu Ristea
- Tim Plester as Dumitru "Dumi" Dorneanu
- Joe Armstrong as Răzvan Orodel
- Marcin Walewski as Mirel Bercovici
- Darrell D'Silva as Minister
- Stuart McQuarrie as Dumitru Dămăceanu
- Monica Bîrlădeanu as Sonia Rosenthal
- Allan Corduner as Flaviu
- David de Keyser as Moritz Zilber
- Frances Cuka as Sarah Zilber
- Andrew Buckley as Gogu
- Martin Hancock as Prosecutor
- John Henshaw as Judge
- Gwyneth Keyworth as Lidia
- Paul Jesson as Studio Manager
- Ionuț Grama as Boris

== Production ==
The film was written and directed by Nae Caranfil, and produced by: Michael Fitzgerald, Denis Friedman, Renata Rainieri, Alessandro Leone and Bobby Păunescu through the production company Mandragora Movies. In August 2011, it was announced that Vera Farmiga and Mark Strong had been cast in leading roles as Alice Bercovici and Max Rosenthal, respectively. Later that month, it was reported that Harry Lloyd had joined the cast in the role of Virgil. The rest of the cast consisted of: Anton Lesser, Joe Armstrong, Christian McKay, Monica Bîrlădeanu, John Henshaw, Gwyneth Keyworth and Stuart McQuarrie. Principal photography took place in Bucharest, Romania in late 2011. The production budget of the film has been estimated to be approximately US$5 million or €4.4 million.

== Distribution ==
=== Release ===
The film had its world premiere on November 29, 2013 at the "Making Waves: New Romanian Cinema Festival" at the Lincoln Center, before being released in Romanian cinemas on March 7, 2014. The film screened at the Romanian Film Festival in London on November 13, 2014. It was then released in Poland on March 13, 2015, and in the United States by Sundance Selects on April 17, 2015. The film screened at the Toronto Jewish Film Festival on May 2, 2015. The film was released in a limited release and through video on demand by Neo (New Entertainment Organization) in the United Kingdom on November 13, 2015.

=== Home media ===
The film was released on DVD in the United States on September 15, 2015. That same day, it was made available for streaming on Netflix.

== Reception ==
=== Box office ===
The film made $5,396 from its sole theatrical screening in the United Kingdom.

=== Critical response ===
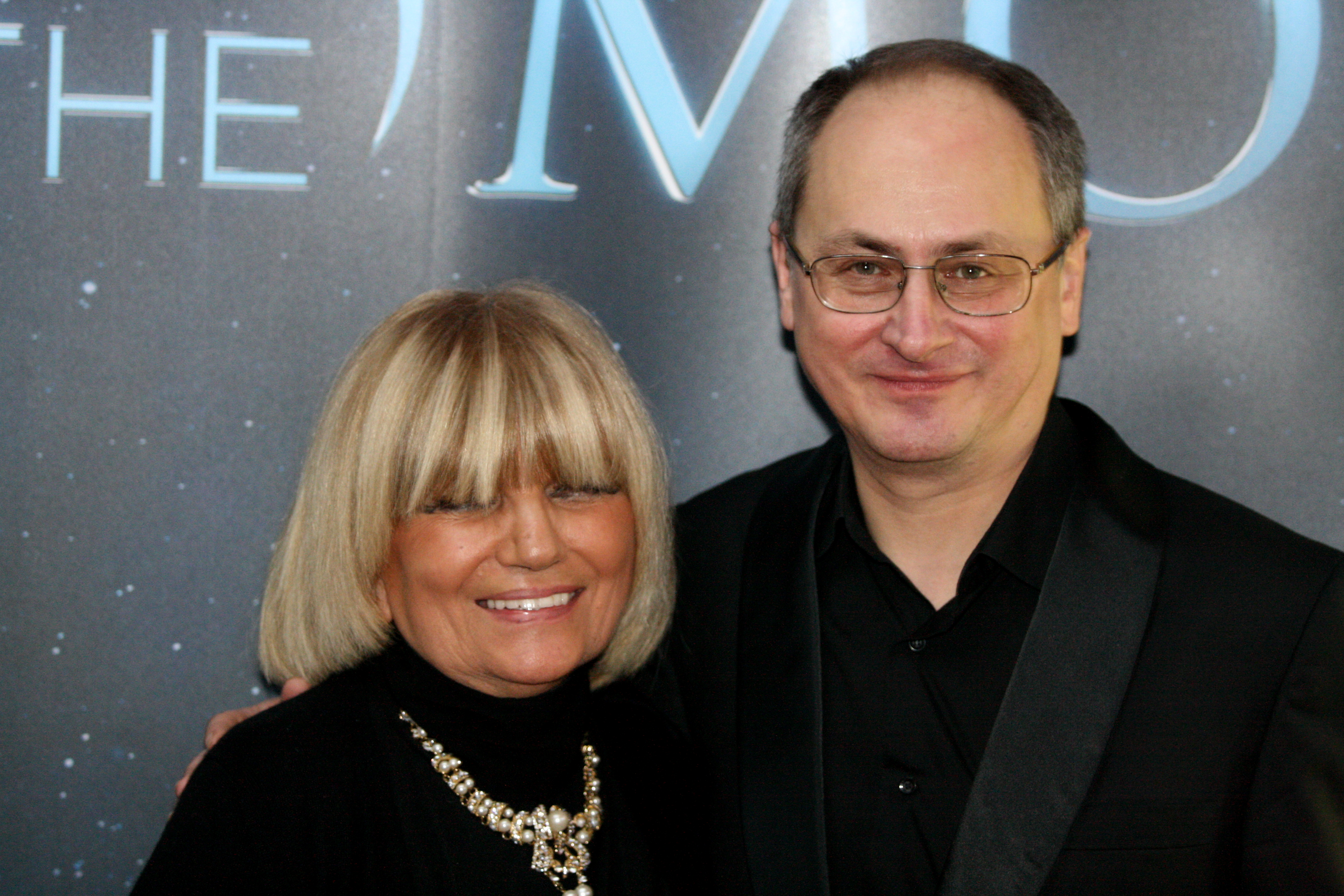
Doina Levintza and Nae Caranfil

The film received a mostly mixed reception from film critics. On review aggregator website Rotten Tomatoes, the film received an approval rating of 46%, based on 13 reviews, with an average rating of 5.8/10. On Metacritic, the film was given a rating average of 47 out of 100, based on 6 reviews, indicating "mixed or average" reviews.

Ronnie Scheib of Variety said: "A strange, but true Romanian bank robbery provides inspiration for this darkly comic tale of history and its myriad interpretations. Shot in English with a mainly British and American cast, this surprisingly entertaining black comedy could connect with American [audiences]." John DeFore of The Hollywood Reporter wrote: "Though based on a true story, the film discards some of its claim to authenticity right off the bat, casting Brits and Americans in all the leads and having them speak English instead of Romanian; later, it will have trouble establishing the gang's motives for a crime they all but knew would lead to their execution. Stateside potential is modest for the semi-convincing yet enjoyable tale, relying on familiar names in a cast that acquits itself well given the demands of the unusual plot."

Tara Karajica of 'Altcine.com' wrote: "As far as the acting is concerned, the cast, mainly British and comprised of Vera Farmiga, Mark Strong, Harry Lloyd, among many others, is evenly exceptional. The technical details as well as Doina Levinta's costumes and the choice of music are also top-notch. All in all, Closer to the Moon, with its tragico-burlesque tone, stellar cast and Caranfil's new and uncompromising vision is a bold, edifying and marvelous history lesson as well as a courageous contribution not only to the Romanian New Wave, but also to cinema in general."

=== Accolades ===
Year	Award	Category	Recipient(s)	Result
2014	Gopo Awards	Best Film	Bobby Păunescu, Michael Fitzgerald, Renata Rainieri, Alessandro Leone, Denis Friedman	Won
2014	Gopo Awards	Best Directing	Nae Caranfil	Won
2014	Gopo Awards	Best Screenplay	Nae Caranfil	Won
2014	Gopo Awards	Best Actress in a Leading Role	Vera Farmiga	Nominated
2014	Gopo Awards	Best Actor in a Leading Role	Mark Strong	Nominated
2014	Gopo Awards	Best Actor in a Leading Role	Harry Lloyd	Nominated
2014	Gopo Awards	Best Music	Laurent Couson	Won
2014	Gopo Awards	Best Cinematography	Marius Panduru	Won
2014	Gopo Awards	Best Costume Design	Doina Levintza	Won
2014	Gopo Awards	Best Hair & Makeup	Laura Ozier, Elena Tudor, Lucas Coulon, Andreescu Maria	Won
2014	Gopo Awards	Best Sound	Florin Tăbăcaru, Alexandru Demitru, Marius Leftarache	Won
2014	Gopo Awards	Best Editing	Cătălin Cristuțiu, Larry Madaras, Roberto Silvi	Won

== See also ==
- Romanian New Wave
- Cinema of Romania
