= Bițu Fălticineanu =

Romanian film director (1925–2012)

- Born: April 16, 1925; Sibiu, Kingdom of Romania
- Died: January 5, 2012 (aged 86)
- Resting place: Bucharest Sephardic Jewish Cemetery
- Known for: Film director

Bițu Fălticineanu (April 16, 1925 – January 5, 2012) was a Romanian film director.

== Biography ==
Fălticineanu was born in the city of Sibiu in 1925. Throughout his career, he worked with artists at the Constantin Tanase Theatre, creating entertainment duos such as Stela Popescu and Alexandru Arşinel, and Nae Lăzărescu and Vasile Muraru.

In the 2011–2012 performance season at the Constantin Theatre, many of his works were performed, such as "Applause, Applause", "Idols of Women", "Revista Magazinelor", and "Arca lui Nae şi Vasile". He also directed "Hello, here is Stroe!", which was dedicated to the 105th anniversary of the birth of Nicolae Stroe. He produced over 200 shows throughout his career, working as long as just a year before his death.

He died on January 5, 2012, of a long-term illness, and is buried in the Bucharest Sephardic Jewish Cemetery.
