= Bucharest Sephardic Jewish Cemetery =

Jewish cemetery in Bucharest, Romania

Coordinates: 44°24′08″N 26°05′46″E

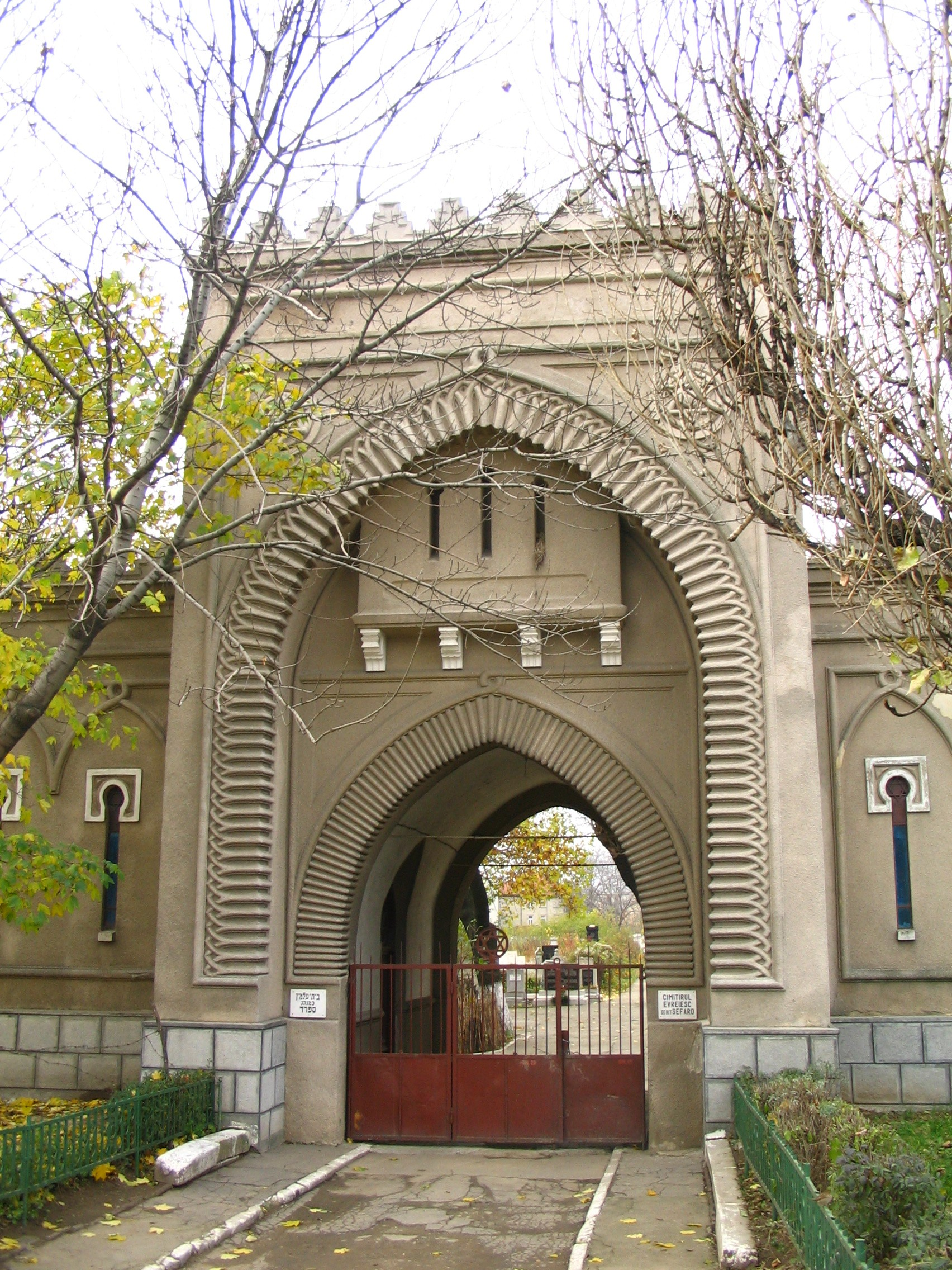
- Entrance to the cemetery

Details
- Established: 1865
- Location: Bucharest, Romania
- Type: Jewish (Sephardic rite)
- Size: 5–6 ha (12–15 acres)
- No. of graves: 10,300

The Bucharest Sephardic Jewish Cemetery (Romanian: Cimitirul evreiesc Sefard din București) is one of three active Jewish cemeteries that still exist in Bucharest. The cemetery is located on 2 Olteniței Street, across the street from Bellu Cemetery, and was opened in 1865. It has an area between 4 and 5 hectares large, and contains 10,300 graves.

== Contents ==
The cemetery is home to many tombstones, among which are some transferred from the former Jewish cemetery on Sevastopol Street, which was the oldest Jewish cemetery in Bucharest that was abolished during the Holocaust under the Ion Antonescu regime. There is also an obelisk present, dedicated in memory of Sephardi Jewish soldiers who died in World War I.

Notable people buried in the cemetery include:

- Abraham Cohen Bucureşteanu
- Theodor Danetti
- Bițu Fălticineanu
- Alexandru Mandy
- Dan Mizrahi
- Elena Negreanu
- Veronica Porumbacu
- Laurențiu Profeta
- Antoaneta Ralian
- Sandu Sticlaru
- Haralamb Zincă

== See also ==
Filantropia Israelite Cemetery in Bucharest
