= Mihai Eminescu National College, Bucharest =

High-school in Bucharest, Romania

Mihai Eminescu National College
- Colegiul Național "Mihai Eminescu"
- Colegiul National Mihai Eminescu sub renovare si consolidare

Location
- Strada George Georgescu, No. 2 Bucharest, Sector 4 Romania; 44.425937°N 26.095666°E

Information
- Type: Public
- Established: 1 Septembrie 1926
- School district: Sector 4
- Enrollment: c. 1,400
- Website: www.eminescubucuresti.ro

Mihai Eminescu National College (Romanian: Colegiul Național "Mihai Eminescu") is a high school located at 2 George Georgescu Street, Bucharest, Romania. It bears the name of Mihai Eminescu, Romania's best-known poet. In 2000, it was granted the title of National College by the Ministry of Education and Research of Romania.

The Mihai Eminescu High School in Bucharest was established on September 1, 1926, as part of an educational expansion in the early 20th century to meet the growing needs of the city's population. Initially housed in a primary school in the Floreasca neighborhood, the high school opened with 160 students and was led by Victor Papacostea, who later became a university professor.

In 1926, the high school was named after the famous Romanian poet Mihai Eminescu, with approval from the Ministry of Education and a royal decree by King Ferdinand I. Despite early challenges, including a lack of proper facilities and the need to move locations, the school grew rapidly under subsequent directors. By the end of 1930, the school was relocated to a building previously occupied by a teacher training college in Calea Rahovei (the present-day Ion Luca Caragiale National College).

Throughout the following decades, the school continued to adapt and expand, incorporating more facilities and modernizing its infrastructure. By 1958, the high school, originally for boys, had merged with nearby institutions, allowing it to further increase its capacity and resources.

The founding of the school was driven by local community efforts and aimed to provide accessible education to children from working-class and lower-middle-class families. Early staff included notable educators and intellectuals, contributing to the high school's reputation for academic excellence and extracurricular achievements.

Overall, the history of Mihai Eminescu High School reflects the broader developments in Romanian education during the early 20th century, emphasizing community involvement, the importance of accessible education, and the adaptability of educational institutions in the face of changing circumstances.

== Faculty ==
- Constantin Noe

== Alumni ==
- Rodica Ojog-Brașoveanu
