= Adrian Enescu =

Romanian composer

Adrian-Floru Enescu (31 March 1948 – 19 August 2016) was a Romanian composer of film soundtracks and contemporary music.

As an individual musician, he also pioneered the local electronic scene during the 1970s and 1980s. He graduated from the Ciprian Porumbescu Music Conservatory in Bucharest, following the composition class of Aurel Stroe and Alexandru Pașcanu in harmony.

Among his list of accomplishments are music for ballet in Italy, China, and Australia, music for theater in Romania, Holland, Belgium, Japan, Australia, Canada, Colombia, and Costa Rica.

== Other accomplishments ==
- In 1976, Basorelief (symphonic pop)
- In 1980, Funky Synthesizer vol 1 (electronic music)
- In 1983, vocal lead Stereo Group (pop music)
- In 1984, Funky Synthesizer vol 2 (electronic music)
- In 1988, Bună seara, iubite (vocal lead, Loredana Groza (pop music))
- In 1989, Un buchet de trandafiri (vocal lead, Loredana Groza) (pop music)
- In 1999-2000, Jingle for "Arcadia Jingle Bank", Germany
- In 2000, Millennium Angel (produced by PRO TV Romania)
- In 2001, Diva (vocal lead, Loredana Groza) (pop music)
- In 2001, November Dreams produced by Axel Springer Company, Germany
- In 2001, EarthTone records division of Sonic Images Records USA published Invisible Music chapter 2 (electronic music)
- In 2002, Buddha Bar3 published Invisible Music chapter 1 (electronic music)
- In 2003, he arranged the music for The Christmas Parade of Disneyland Paris, France
- In 2013, Bird in Space jazz music, produced by A&A Records
- In 2014, Invisible Movies music for film, produced by A&A Records
- Symphonic music : electroacoustic music, music for solo viola, DOMINO - concerto for percussion & orchestra, TABU - concerto for vibraphone & orchestra, Labyrinth music for 8 clarinets, The Journey of Orpheus/opera - new version & variations on C. W. Gluck's themes, Cinematic for chamber orchestra
- In 2014 Bach in showbiz (Bach variations) for Zoli Toth quartet

== Film music ==
- 2014 Kira, Kiralina
- 2005 Femeia visurilor
- 2005 Second-Hand
- 2002 Noro
- 2001 Struma (documentary)
- 1999 Love and Other Unspeakable Acts
- 1998 Die letzte Station
- 1996 Eu sunt Adam!
- 1994 Pepi și Fifi
- 1994 Somnul insulei
- 1994 Thalassa, Thalassa
- 1992 Miss Christina
- 1992 Hotel de lux
- 1991 Unde la soare e frig
- 1990 Coroana de foc
- 1989 Flori de gheață
- 1989 Mircea
- 1988 Hanul dintre dealuri
- 1988 Rezervă la start
- 1987 François Villon - Poetul vagabond
- 1986 Umbrele soarelui
- 1985 Ringul
- 1985 Adela
- 1985 Ciuleandra
- 1985 Noi, cei din linia întîi
- 1985 Pas în doi
- 1985 Racolarea
- 1983 Dreptate în lanțuri
- 1983 Sand Cliffs
- 1983 Să mori rănit din dragoste de viață
- 1982 Așteptînd un tren
- 1982 Concurs
- 1982 Sfîrșitul noptii
- 1981 Pruncul, petrolul și Ardelenii
- 1981 Semnul șarpelui
- 1979 The Actress, the Dollars and the Transylvanians
- 1979 Bietul Ioanide
- 1978 Doctorul Poenaru
- 1978 Pe firul apei
- 1978 Profetul, aurul și Ardelenii
- 1978 Revansa
- 1977 L'art de la conversation
- 1977 Rîul care urca muntele
- 1977 Tufa de Veneția
- 1977 Urgia
- 1976 Tănase Scatiu
- 1973 Întoarcerea lui Magellan
- 1973 Șapte zile
- 1973 Une seule nuit dans le studio (TV movie)
