= 6.9 on the Richter Scale =

- Film poster
- Directed by: Nae Caranfil
- Written by: Nae Caranfil
- Produced by: Gábor Garami; Hristo Hristov; Cristian Mungiu
- Starring: Laurențiu Bănescu; Maria Obretin; Teodor Corban; Simona Arsu
- Release date: May 27, 2016 (Romania)
- Running time: 117 minutes
- Country: Romania
- Language: Romanian
- Box office: $105,000

6.9 on the Richter Scale (original title in Romanian: 6,9 pe scara Richter) is a 2016 Romanian musical comedy film directed by Nae Caranfil. It stars Laurențiu Bănescu, Maria Obretin, Teodor Corban and Simona Arsu. The plot revolves around Tony (Bănescu), a theatre actor who moves into a new apartment with his depressed and pathologically jealous wife Kitty (Obretin) and becomes obsessed with the idea that a devastating earthquake will come imminently; he also meets his sexually addicted father (Corban), a former pilot, who Tony hasn't since his childhood.

At the 2018 Gopo Awards, the film was nominated for eight awards, winning five of them.
