= Elena Negreanu =

Romanian actress (1918–2016)

- Born: February 13, 1918; Iași, Kingdom of Romania
- Died: January 26, 2016 (aged 98); Bucharest, Romania
- Education: Caragiale National University of Theatre and Film

Elena Negreanu (February 13, 1918 – January 26, 2016) was a Romanian Jewish actress, graphic designer, and director.

== Biography ==
Negreanu is the daughter of Constantin (1870–1921), a Translyvanian professor of chemistry, and Sevasta Negreanu (1890–1944), a professor of history. She was one of 7 children in her family. At the age of 3, her father died, and her mother married fellow history professor Gavril Musuțuț, who encouraged Negreanu to become an actress. She attended acting classes in Bucharest in the class of Professor Beate Fredanov.

Starting in 1947, she was an actress at the National Theatre Bucharest and a lecturer at the Caragiale National University of Theatre and Film. In 1956, she became an artistic director of the Romanian Radio Broadcasting Company, engaging in classical audio performances until her departure in 1980.

She died on January 26, 2016, in Bucharest and is buried in the Bucharest Sephardic Jewish Cemetery.

== Filmography ==
- A Lost Letter (1954) – Second director
