= Red Apples (film) =

1975 film

- Directed by: Alexandru Tatos
- Starring: Ion Cojar; Mircea Diaconu
- Release date: 15 October 1975
- Running time: 1h 45min
- Country: Romania
- Language: Romanian

Red Apples (Romanian: Mere roșii) is a 1975 Romanian drama film directed by Alexandru Tatos.

== Cast ==
- Ion Cojar - Mitroi
- Mircea Diaconu - Mitică Irod
- Carmen Galin - Psychologist
- Angela Stoenescu - Nurse
