= Asphalt Tango =

1996 film

- Directed by: Nae Caranfil
- Starring: Charlotte Rampling; Mircea Diaconu
- Release date: 13 November 1996
- Running time: 100 minutes
- Countries: Romania; France
- Languages: Romanian; French

Asphalt Tango (Romanian: Asfalt Tango) is a 1996 Romanian comedy film directed by Nae Caranfil.

== Cast ==
- Charlotte Rampling - Marion
- Mircea Diaconu - Andrei
- Florin Călinescu - Gigi
- Constantin Cotimanis - Le chauffeur
