= Florin Zamfirescu =

Romanian actor

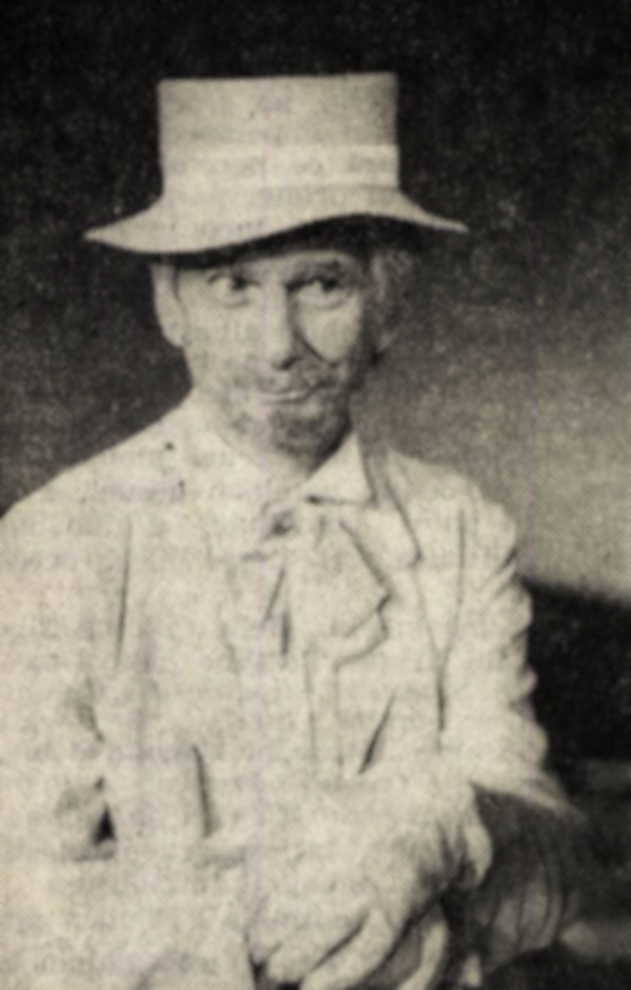
- Zamfirescu as Sorin in a 1989 production of The Seagull
- Born: Gheorghe Florin Zamfirescu; 12 April 1949 (age 77); Călimănești, Vâlcea County, Romanian People's Republic
- Education: Caragiale National University of Theatre and Film
- Occupations: Film actor, theatre actor, film director
- Years active: 1971–present
- Spouse(s): Rodica Popa (musician); Valeria Sitaru (d. 1991); Cătălina Mustață (m. 1991–d. 2012)
- Children: Vlad Zamfirescu; Ștefana Samfira
- Awards: Order of Cultural Merit, 3rd class National Order of Merit, Knight rank

Florin Zamfirescu (Romanian pronunciation: [floˈrin zamfiˈresku]; born 12 April 1949) is a Romanian theatre and film actor and director, and university professor.

== Biography ==
Zamfirescu was born in Călimănești, Vâlcea County; his grandfather, Gheorghe Zamfirescu, was mayor of the town.

He graduated from the Caragiale National University of Theatre and Film in Bucharest in 1971.

From 1971 to 1973, he was an actor in the Municipal Theatre of Târgu Mureș, and subsequently moved to the Odeon Theatre in Bucharest. From 1974 to 1978 he was an instructor Caragiale National University; in 1996 he became a professor, and from 2000 to 2008 he served as rector of the university. In 2002 he received Ph.D. in Arts, with thesis "Acting or Magic". In 2014 he was let go from the Odeon Theatre by its director, Dorina Lazăr.

In 1984, Zamfirescu was awarded the Order of Cultural Merit, 3rd class, and in 2002 he was awarded the National Order of Merit, Knight rank.

== Filmography ==
- Meda or the Not So Bright Side of Things (2017) – Pandele
- Moromeții 2 (2018) – Stan Țugurlan
- Meda (2016)
- 10 Hours (2015)
- Acasă la tata (2015) – The father
- Back Home (2015) – Robert's father
- Doar cu buletinul la Paris (2015)
- Kira Kiralina (2014) – Ilie
- Happy Funerals (2013) – Beggar
- Child's Pose (2013) – Aurelian Făgărășanu
- Killing Time (2012) – The old man
- Narcisa sălbatică (2011) – Narcisa's father
- Iubire și onoare (2010) – Said bin Faisal
- Aniela (2009) – Haralamb
- Weekend with my Mother (2009) – Felix
- Regina (2008)
- Restul e tăcere (2008) – Colonel Guță
- Inimă de țigan (2007) – Gigi Dumbravă
- Cum mi-am petrecut sfârșitul lumii (2006) – School's principal
- Iubire ca în filme (2006) – Spiridon
- Femeia visurilor (2005) – Cratofil
- The Death of Mr. Lazarescu (2005) – Dr. Ardelean
- Estul salbatic (2004)
- Nepoții lui Adam (2004) – Narrator
- Orient Express (2004) - Take Criveanu
- Rivoglio i miei figli / Totul pentru copiii mei (2004)
- Sindromul Timișoara – Manipularea (2004)
- Ultimul stinge lumina (2004) – Niță Snae
- Dulcea saună a morții (2003) – Mangiurea
- Maria (2003) – Ahmed
- ...Sub clar de lună (2002)
- Al matale, Caragiale (2002)
- Filantropica (2002) – Poetul Garii de Nord
- Detectiv fără voie (2001)
- Netsuke (2001)
- Don Juan sau dragostea pentru pentru geometrie (1997)
- Don Carlos (1996)
- Transfer de personalitate (1996)
- Mincinosul (1995)
- Senatorul melcilor (1995)
- Im Zeichen der Liebe (1994)
- E pericoloso sporgersi (1993) – Service officer
- Inelul cu briliant (1993)
- Dragoste și apă caldă (1992) – Emil, engineer and taxi driver
- Șobolanii roșii (1991) – Securitate officer
- Marea sfidare (1989)
- Danga langa / (1988) – autorul poeziei
- De ce are vulpea coadă? (1988)
- Iacob (1988) – Covaci
- Nelu (1988)
- The Moromete Family (1987) – Țugurlan
- Cale liberă (1986)
- Pădurea de fagi (1986)
- Întunecare (1985)
- Năpasta (1985)
- Lumini și umbre: Partea II (1982)
- Pădurea nebună (1982) – Darie
- Ramân cu tine (1982) – Machidon
- De ce trag clopotele, Mitică? (1981) – Un catindat de la Percepție
- Lumini și umbre: Partea I (1981)
- Un echipaj pentru Singapore (1981) – Captain Mărgineanu
- Cumpăna (1979)
- Iarba verde de acasă (1978)
- Înainte de tăcere (1978) – Servant Petre
- Frunze care ard (1977)
- Dincolo de pod (1976) – Trica
- Tănase Scatiu (1976)
- Mere roșii (1975) – Gică
- Actorul și sălbaticii (1975)
- Tatăl risipitor (1974) – Railwayman Zamfir
- Rate cu repetiție (1973) – Soldier Popescu
- Așteptarea (1970)
