= Mircea Veroiu =

Romanian film director

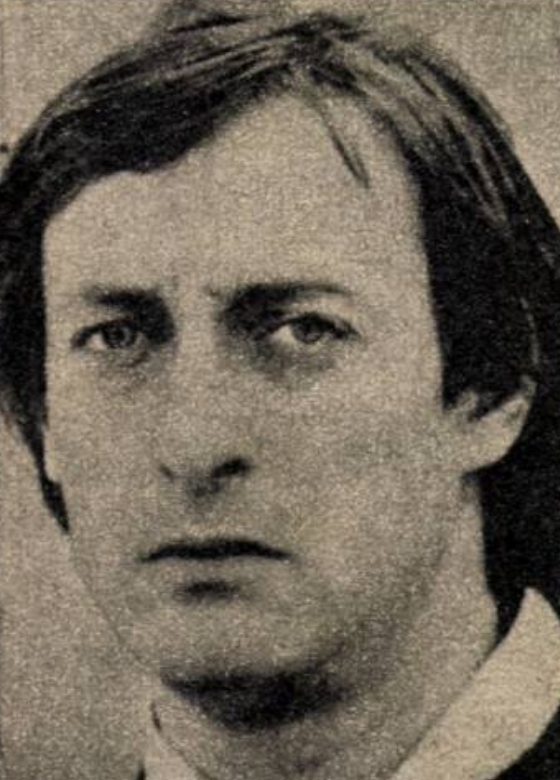
- Born: 29 April 1941; Târgu Jiu, Kingdom of Romania
- Died: 26 December 1997 (aged 56); Bucharest, Romania
- Education: I. L. Caragiale National University of Theatre and Film
- Occupations: Film director Screenwriter
- Years active: 1968–1997
- Spouse(s): Silvia Kerim; Elena Albu

Mircea Veroiu (Romanian pronunciation: [ˈmirtʃe̯a veˈroju]; 29 April 1941 – 26 December 1997) was a Romanian film director and screenwriter.

Born in Târgu Jiu, he graduated from the I.L. Caragiale Institute of Theatre and Film Arts (IATC) in 1970. He directed 22 films between 1968 and 1997. He was a member of the jury at the 41st Berlin International Film Festival.

== Selected filmography ==
- The Stone Wedding (1972) – director
- The Actor and the Savages (1975) – actor
- Armed and Dangerous (1977) — actor
- The Prophet, the Gold and the Transylvanians (1978) — director
- The Actress, the Dollars and the Transylvanians (1979) — director
- Adela (1985)— director, screenwriter
