= Manole Marcus =

Romanian film director and screenwriter

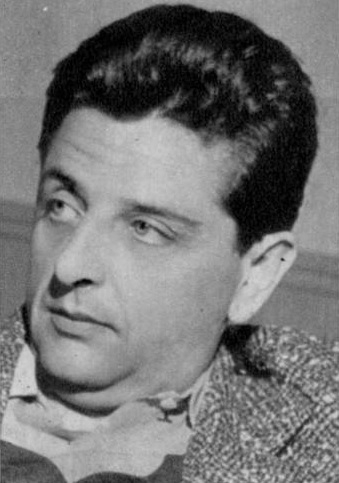
- Born: 8 January 1928; Bucharest, Romania
- Died: 12 October 1994 (aged 66); Bucharest, Romania
- Education: Caragiale National University of Theatre and Film
- Occupations: Film director, screenwriter
- Years active: 1953–1989

Manole Marcus (8 January 1928 – 12 October 1994) was a Romanian film director and screenwriter. Many of the actors who starred in his films won awards for their performances.

== Studies and career ==
In 1955 he graduated from the I.L. Caragiale Institute of Theatre and Film Arts (IATC). He made his directing debut with the short film La mere (1953), directed together with Iulian Mihu.

The 1950s was a difficult period for Romanian film, as filmmakers had to give up most of the "conquests" in terms of cinematic language obtained before the end of World War II. Culture was then subjected to a pseudo-artistic socialist realism, which called for works with excessively politicized topics. In this climate, Marcus made a number of comedy films of lesser value, such as such as I do Not Want to Get Married (1960) and The District of Joy (1964). Towards the second half of the 1960s, the director adopted a more serious tone. His talent as a director started to be appreciated and recognized after the dramatic tone of the movies Virgo (1966), The Canary and the Blizzard (1969), and The Power and the Truth (1972). The 1969 movie, which talks about the price of freedom of political underground mission, pursued by the authorities, and whose soundtrack is between the Phoenix band's tracks, was banned in the early 1970s.

The climax of his artistic career came at a time when it was hard to tell the truth easily, as freedom of expression was restricted (see Censorship in Communist Romania). In the 1970s, Marcus made two films which were greatly appreciated by the public and by critics: The Actor and the Savages (1974) and Operation Monster (1976), a drama and a comedy which sometimes fail to convey emotions through subliminal messages powerful, to make characters.

== Filmography ==
- La mere (1953)
- Viața nu iartă (1957)
- Într-o dimineață (1959)
- Nu vreau să mă însor (1960)
- Străzile au amintiri (1962)
- Cartierul veseliei (1964)
- Zodia Fecioarei (1966)
- Singur (1968)
- Canarul și viscolul (1969)
- Puterea și adevărul (1972)
- Conspirația (1973)
- Departe de Tipperary (1973)
- Capcana (1974)
- Actorul și sălbaticii (1974)
- Operațiunea Monstrul (1976)
- Cianura și picătura de ploaie (1978)
- Omul care ne trebuie (1980)
- Punga cu libelule (1980)
- Orgolii (1981)
- Non-stop (1981)
- Ca-n filme (1983)
- Mitică Popescu (1984)
- Marea sfidare (1989)
- Vâltoarea (1989)

As a scenarist, he wrote La mere and Viața nu iartă in collaboration with Iulian Mihu; Cartierul veseliei in collaboration with Ioan Grigorescu; Cianura și picătura de ploaie in collaboration with Virgil Mogoș; Non–stop; and Orgolii.

As an actor, he played the role of the painter in the movie The Actor and the Savages.

== Awards ==
- Cartierul veseliei (1964) - Award for Best Director, National Film Festival in Mamaia, 1965
- Zodia Fecioarei (1966) - Diploma of Honor and the trophy "Dama del Paraguas"
- Puterea și adevărul (1971)- International Film Festival in Barcelona, 1967
- The Actor and the Savages (1974) - Award ACIN, 1972 - Nomination Grand Prix at the 9th Moscow International Film Festival, 1975 and two ACIN awards: Special Jury Prize for Directing and Actor Award Toma Caragiu man we need - Prize ACIN, 1979

== Bibliography ==
- Cristina Corciovescu, Bujor T. Rîpeanu (1996). 1234 Cineaști români, Editura Științifică, București
