= Haralamb Zincă =

Romanian writer active in the 20th century

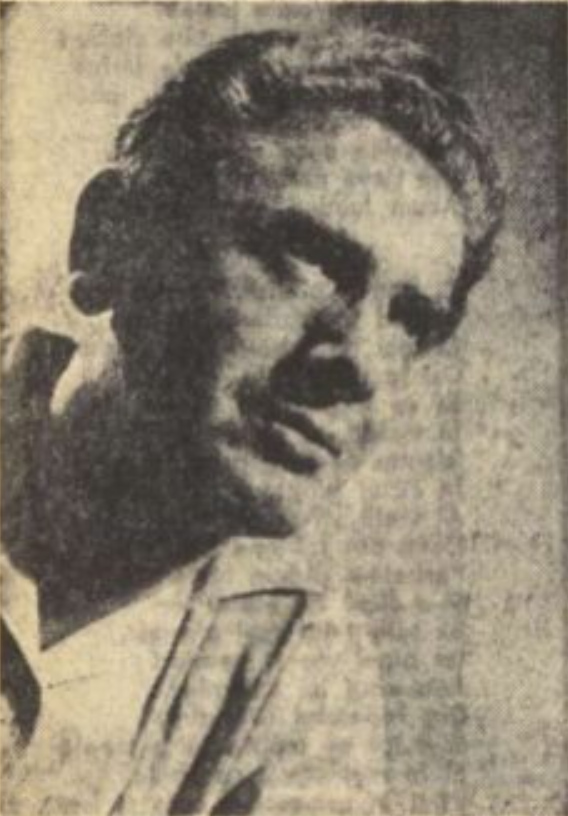
Haralamb Zincă

Hary Isac Zilberman a.k.a. Haralamb Zincă (born 4 July 1923 in Roman – died 24 December 2008 in Bucharest) was a Romanian writer.

He is buried in the Bucharest Sephardic Jewish Cemetery.

== Books ==
- Amintire (1956)
- Cazul R-16
- Ultima toamnă (1958)
- Popasuri... (1959)
- Dintre sute de catarge (1961)
- Palma lui Hercules (1963)
- Sfârşitul spionului Fantomă (1963)
- Zefirul (1964)
- Taina cavalerului de Dolenga (1965)
- Moartea vine pe bandă de magnetofon (1967)
- Ochii doctorului King (1968)
- O crimă aproape perfectă (1969)
- Şi a fost ora H (1971)
- Un caz de dispariţie : Anchete sociale (1972)
- Dispărut fără urmă (1973)
- Limuzina neagră (1973)
- Supersonicul 01 Decolează in Zori (1974)
- Un glonte pentru rezident (1975)
- Soarele a murit în zori (1976)
- Mapa cenuşie G.R. (1977)
- Toamna cu frunze negre (1978)
- Eu, H.Z., aventurierul (1979)
- Anotimpurile morţii (1980)
- Glonţul de zahăr (1981)
- Destinul căpitanului Iamandi (1982)
- Dosarul aviatorului singuratic (1983)
- Operaţiunea "Soare" (1984)
- Ultima noapte de război, prima zi de pace (1985)
- Noaptea cea mai lungă. Cartea I: Dincolo de întuneric (1986)
- Noaptea cea mai lungă. Cartea II: Marea confruntare (1987)
- Fiecare om cu clepsidra lui (1988)
- Revelion 45 (1989)
- Suspecta moarte a lui Mario Campanella (1991)
- Coşciugul agentului K-05 (1991)
- "Spion" prin arhive secrete (1993)
- Moartea m-a bătut pe umăr (1993)
- Dragul meu Sherlock Holmes (1993)
- Interpolul transmite: arestaţi-l! (1993)
- Moarta mirosea a Christian Dior (1997)
- Noiembrie însângerat (2000)
