= Dorotheea Petre =

Romanian actress

- Born: 9 January 1981 (age 45); Bucharest, Romania
- Education: Caragiale National University of Theatre and Film
- Occupation: Film actress
- Years active: 2005–present

Dorotheea Petre (born 9 January 1981) is a Romanian actress. She won a special jury award for best actress at the Cannes Film Festival in 2006 for her performance as Eva Matei in The Way I Spent the End of the World.

== Early life ==
Born in Bucharest, she graduated in acting from the Caragiale National University of Theatre and Film of Bucharest in 2006.

== Filmography ==
Year	Film	Role	Notes
2005	Ryna	Ryna	Best Debut, Transilvania International Film Festival (TIFF 2005)
2006	The Way I Spent the End of the World	Eva	Winner, Special Jury Award for Best Actress, Un Certain Regard, Cannes Film Festival, 2006
2008	Lunch Break	Eva	
2008	Doctori de mame	Adina	TV Series
2008	Black Sea	Angela	
2011	The Childhood of Icarus	Anna	
2011	The Whistleblower	Mara	
2015	Miracolul din Tekir	Mara	

== List of awards and nominations ==
- 2009: Magna Graecia Film Festival – Best Actress
- 2006: Cannes Film Festival – Special Jury Award for Best Actress, Un Certain Regard
- 2007: Order of Cultural Merit, Knight rank awarded by the President of Romania
- 2007: Critics' and Journalists' Society: Best Actress of the Year
- 2007: GOPO Award: Best Actress Award
- 2007: UCIN Award: Best Actress Award
- 2006: Marea Neagră Film Festival: Best Actress Award
- 2006: International Filmfestival Mannheim-Heidelberg: Special Jury Award
- 2005: Transilvania International Film Festival: Best Debut Award
