= Tudor Caranfil =

Romanian film critic (1931–2019)

- Born: 14 September 1931; Galați, Romania
- Died: 23 March 2019 (aged 87); Bucharest, Romania
- Occupation: Film critic

Tudor Caranfil (14 September 1931 – 23 March 2019) was a Romanian film critic. He was the father of film director Nae Caranfil.

== Biography ==
He attended V. Alecsandri College in Galati and last year, as well as a bachelor's degree at the Mihai Viteazu High School in Bucharest. He graduated from the Faculty of Philosophy in 1957 to later publish journalism at Bucharest Information. Beginning in the 1960s, he devoted himself to film criticism. From 1962, he created "The friends of the friends of the night", the first form of the Romanian cinematheque.

He had been invited to the Cannes Film Festival, the Berlin Film Festival and was a member of the FIPRESCI jury. He participated in many other international film festivals in Karlovy Vary, Los Angeles, Locarno, Cottbus, Rotterdam, San Francisco, and major Romanian film festivals.

He won the film critic's award from the Romanian Film Association (ACIN) in 1988 for the volume "In Search of the Lost Film" (tied with Olteea Vasilescu).

== Published volumes ==
- Din luptele studentimii democrate, București, Editura Tineretului, (1956)
- 7 capodopere ale filmului mut, (1966)
- F. W. Murnau, (1968)
- Contribuții la istoria cinematografiei în România – volum sub redacția lui Ion Cantacuzino, (1971)
- Romanul unui film: "Cetățeanul Kane", (1978, 2008)
- Vîrstele peliculei, vol. 1 (De la "Stropitorul stropit" la "Crucișătorul Potiomkin"), (1982)
- Vîrstele peliculei, vol. 2 (Apogeul filmului tăcut), (1984)
- În căutarea filmului pierdut sau trei "romane" cinematografice, (1988)
- Vîrstele peliculei, vol. 3 (O artă la răscruce), (1990)
- Vârstele peliculei, vol. 4 (Cinematograful sonor își caută specificul), (1998)
- Dicționar de filme românești, (2002)
- Dicționar universal de filme, (2002, 2003, 2008).
- Pe aripile vântului, (2003)
- Istoria cinematografiei în capodopere: De la "Cântărețul de jazz" la "Luminile orașului (1927–1931), Editura Polirom, 2010
- Dicționar subiectiv al realizatorilor filmului românesc, Editura Polirom, 2013

== See also ==
- Cinema of Romania
