= Nae Lăzărescu =

Romanian actor and comedian

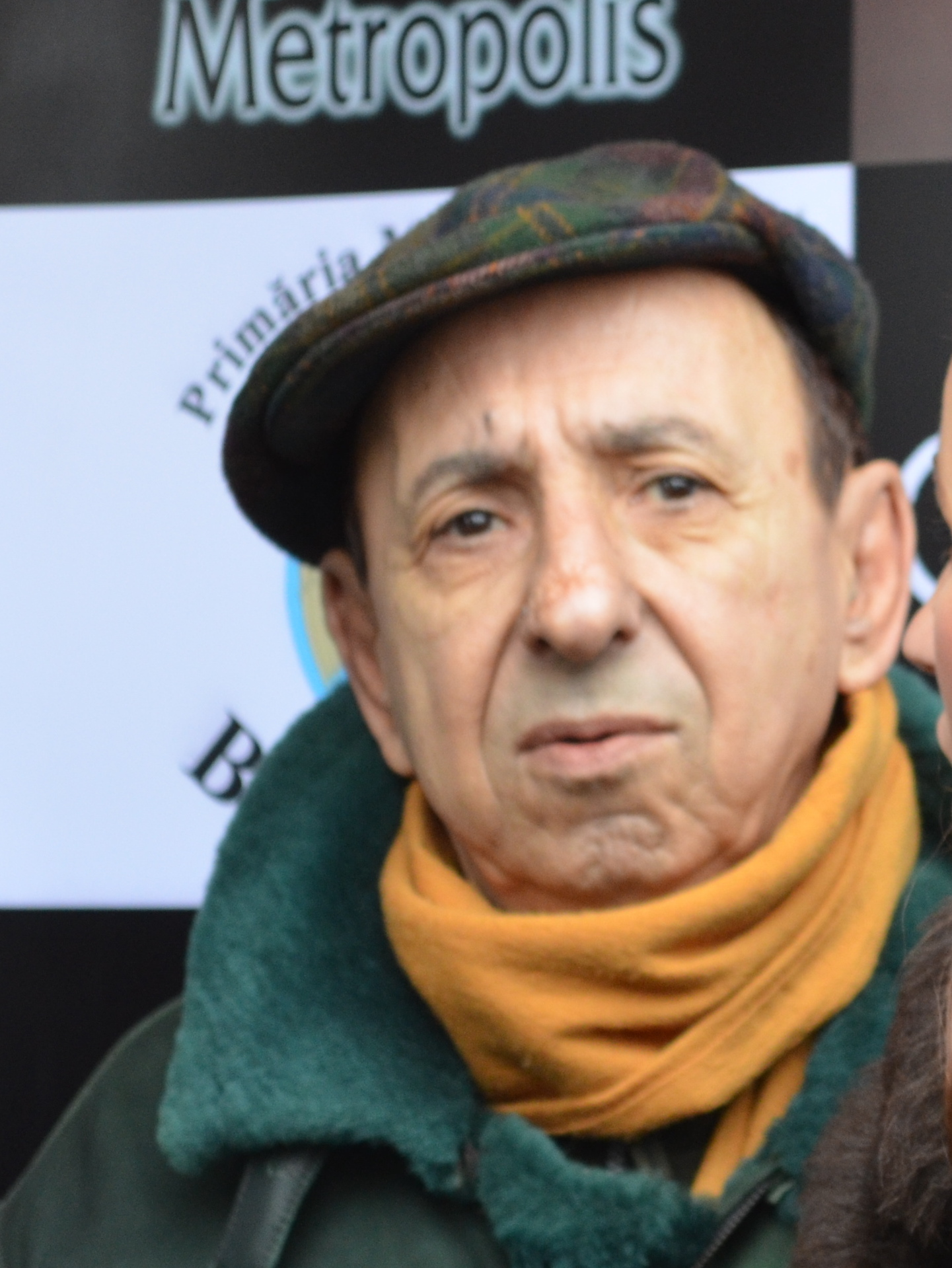
- Nae Lăzărescu in December 2011.
- Born: Niculae Lăzărescu; 8 September 1941; Bucharest, Romania
- Died: 19 December 2013 (aged 72); Bucharest, Romania
- Burial place: Focșani
- Education: Bucharest Academy of Economic Studies
- Occupations: Actor, comedian
- Years active: 1963–2013

Niculae Lăzărescu also known as Nae Lăzărescu (Romanian pronunciation: [ˈna.e ləzəˈresku]; 8 September 1941 – 19 December 2013) was a Romanian television, stage and screen actor as well as a famous comedian.

Born in Bucharest, Romania, Lăzărescu began his career in 1963. Lăzărescu was best known for his work with the Constantin Tănase Theater. He is also famous for the "Nae şi Vasile" comedic duo, in which he appeared together with fellow actor and long-time friend Vasile Muraru for the past 20 years. In the last years they were a recurrent show-up in the New Year's Eve TV special at Antena 1.

Nae Lăzărescu died of chronic liver disease on 19 December 2013, aged 72, in Bucharest, Romania. He was buried on 21 December in Focșani, Vrancea County.

== Biography ==
Nae Lăzărescu was born on 30 January 1940 in a poor neighborhood of Bucharest. Surrounded by his parents' love, he lived in a class with 64 kids, as the great actor says.

His first contact with acting was when he was only a child, in his first year of school. He met titans such as Bimbo Mărculescu, Vasile Tormazian, a quite remarkable monologue actor, and Nae took advantage of the long breaks between the cinematographic performances, and shook hands with Puiu Călinescu, Alexandru Gheorghiu, Nae Roman, etc.

While studying at Bucharest Academy of Economic Studies, Nae Lăzărescu performed in a satirical theater group as a beginner. After this start in his career, he worked at Romanian Rhapsodie, in the platform section. He had the chance to befriend one of the most important singers from 1970's Romania, Aurelian Andreescu; the actor, recalls his memories about it: "From joke to joke I am what you see. I do a lot of pilferages along this life. After my friend, Aurelian Andreescu died, I stop this actions. Since then, 30 years or more passed. Soon I will stop the others too ...". The debut came for Nae in 1963, when he embraced a job as an actor at Constantin Tănase Theater, a fulfillment for 50 years, more precisely, for a lifetime, along with his stage partner, Vasile Muraru, their couplets have been written in the Romanian history of art, centuries from this moment, because their humor was a strong one, with a lot of connotations for the Romanian politics, and for the poor life conditions.

In an exclusive interview for the Tănase Theater, the actor, talked about his models in his career: "I have several models. Then France reached the top, and own the cream of the comedians. Bourvil, Fernandel, and then Jean Le Trevle, and more than you imagine. Marcel Sardou, the famous film critic, said that the best film needs to be produced by the English, funded by the Americans, and sold by the French".

On the other side, speaking about his major roles in Romania, Nae Lăzărescu said: "All roles played by me are my favorite, of course, I had "flops", cause it's the way it is. The revue theater, it's like a newspaper, a spoken newspaper. The revue screenplay, in the least, changes the circumstances.".

About his television experience, Nae told that he did it, in the period of holidays, Easter, Christmas, New Year etc. "I know that television was in Moliere. Now, where can I go? At panels, with loggerheads?! All knows all. We, the students, had a show at a month. And yes, bands, one better than other. At couplets, Eugen Ciceu accompanied us at piano. We had great singers. It was Dan Spătaru, Pompilia Stoian, Anca Agemolu...".

He also played in films, like "Grăbește-te încet", "Șantaj", "Baloane de curcubeu", "Căsătorie cu repetiție" and "Viraj periculos". Also, he provided the Romanian voice of Dusty Rust-eze in Cars from Pixar, an experience for his career that was very interesting.
