= Ileana Stana-Ionescu =

Romanian actress and politician (1936–2024)

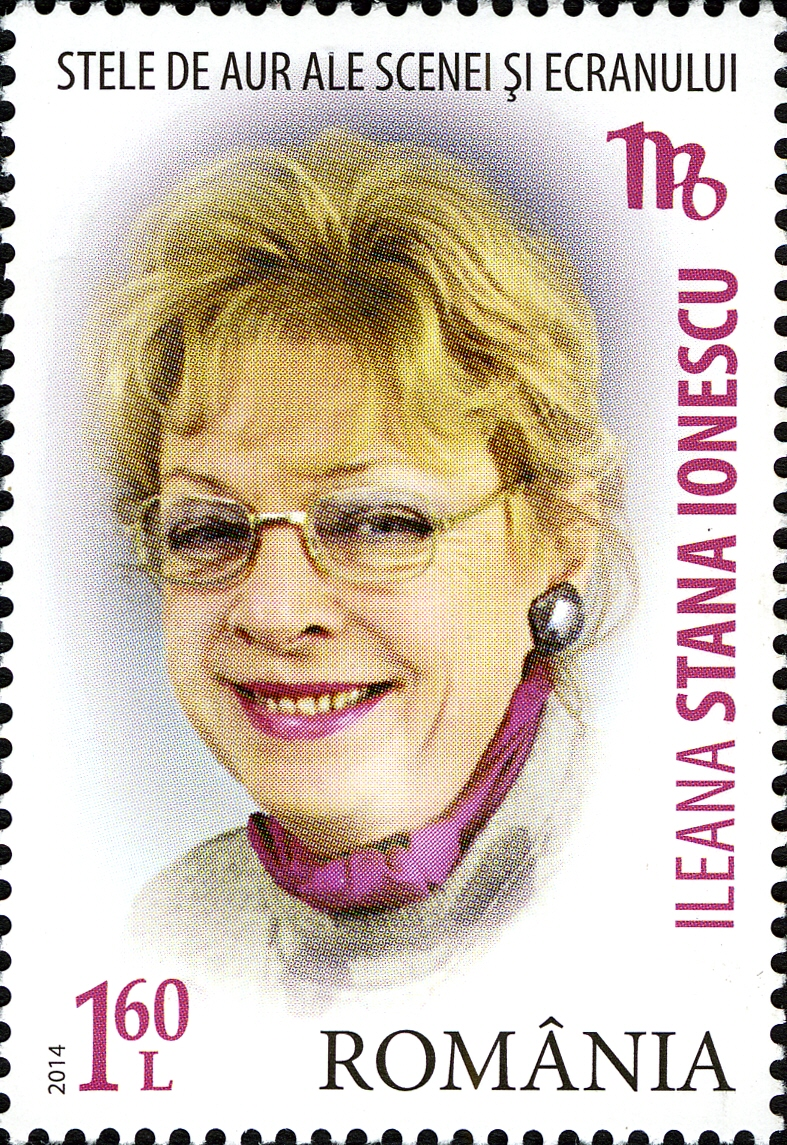
- Born: 14 September 1936; Brad (Kingdom of Romania)
- Died: 30 June 2024 (aged 87)
- Alma mater: Traian National College

Ileana Stana-Ionescu (14 September 1936 – 30 June 2024) was a Romanian actress and politician. She was born in Brad, Hunedoara and made her debut in theatre in 1955. She was a member of the Chamber of Deputies from 2000 to 2004, representing the country's Italian minority.

In 2018, the actress dubbed the voice of Queen from the animated film The Great Mouse Detective.

Stana-Ionescu died on 30 June 2024, at the age of 87.
