= UCIN =

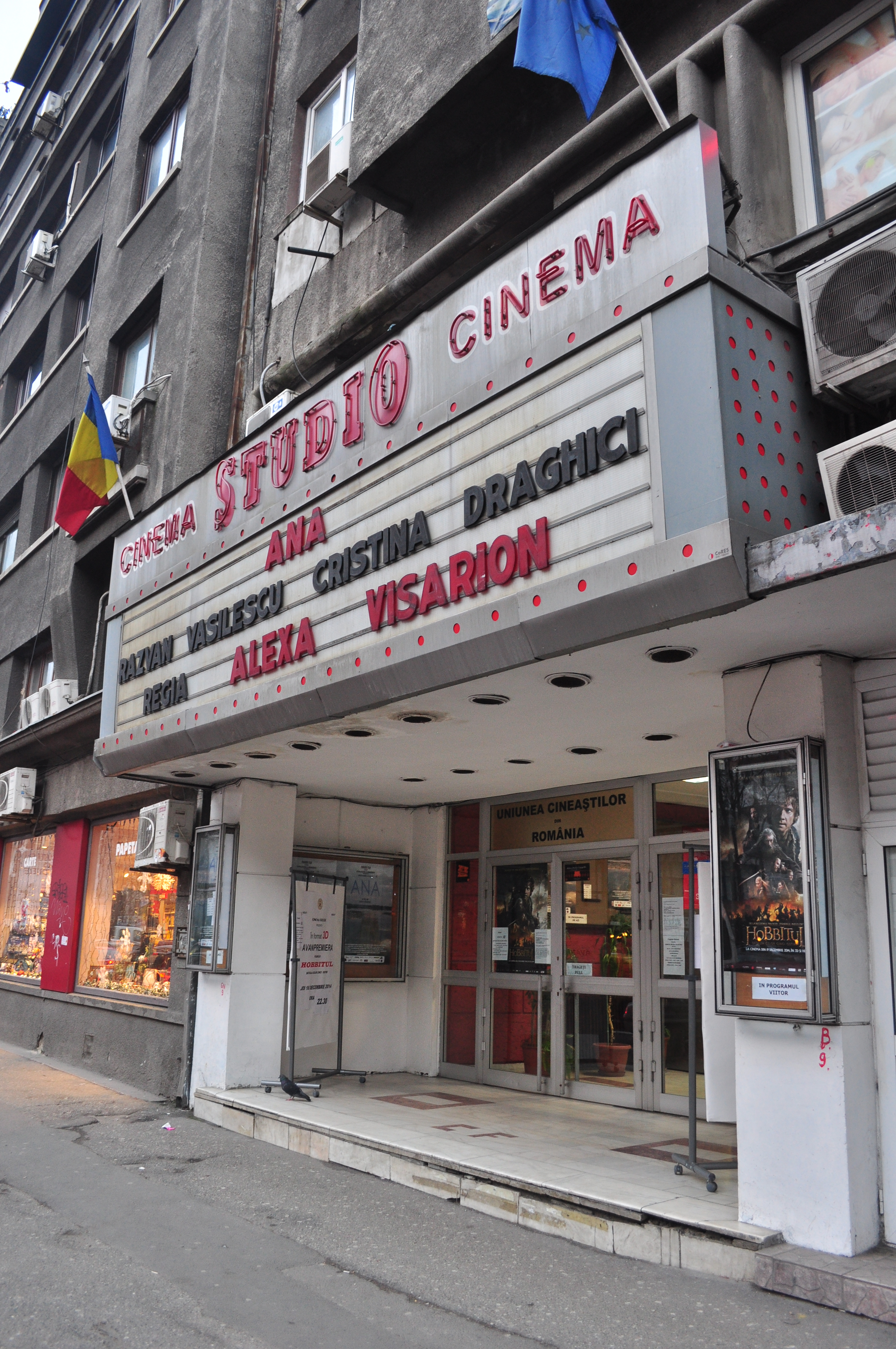
Entrance to Cinema Studio; UCIN is in the same building.

The Romanian Filmmakers Union (Romanian: Uniunea Cineaștilor din România), known as UCIN, is the continuation since 1990 of the Communist-era Asociația Cineaștilor din România (The Romanian Filmmakers Association). It is an autonomous, non-governmental body with an elected leadership, concerned with "the protection of the creative and professional activities, of the moral and material interests of the Romanian filmmakers." They award the Premiile Uniunii Cineaștilor din România, much as the United States Academy of Motion Picture Arts and Sciences gives the Academy Awards.

There are 850 members (variously full, associated or honorary, Romanian or foreign). Its fourteen associations representing the basic film professions: film directors, directors of photography, film actors, set and costume designers, soundtrack creators, film critics, script-writers, film animators, film editors, film producers, film promoters, chemical engineers, make-up artists, and stuntmen.

They also operate Cinema Studio, a cinema at Bulevardul Gheorghe Magheru 29, Bucharest.
