= Nae Caranfil =

Romanian film director and screenwriter

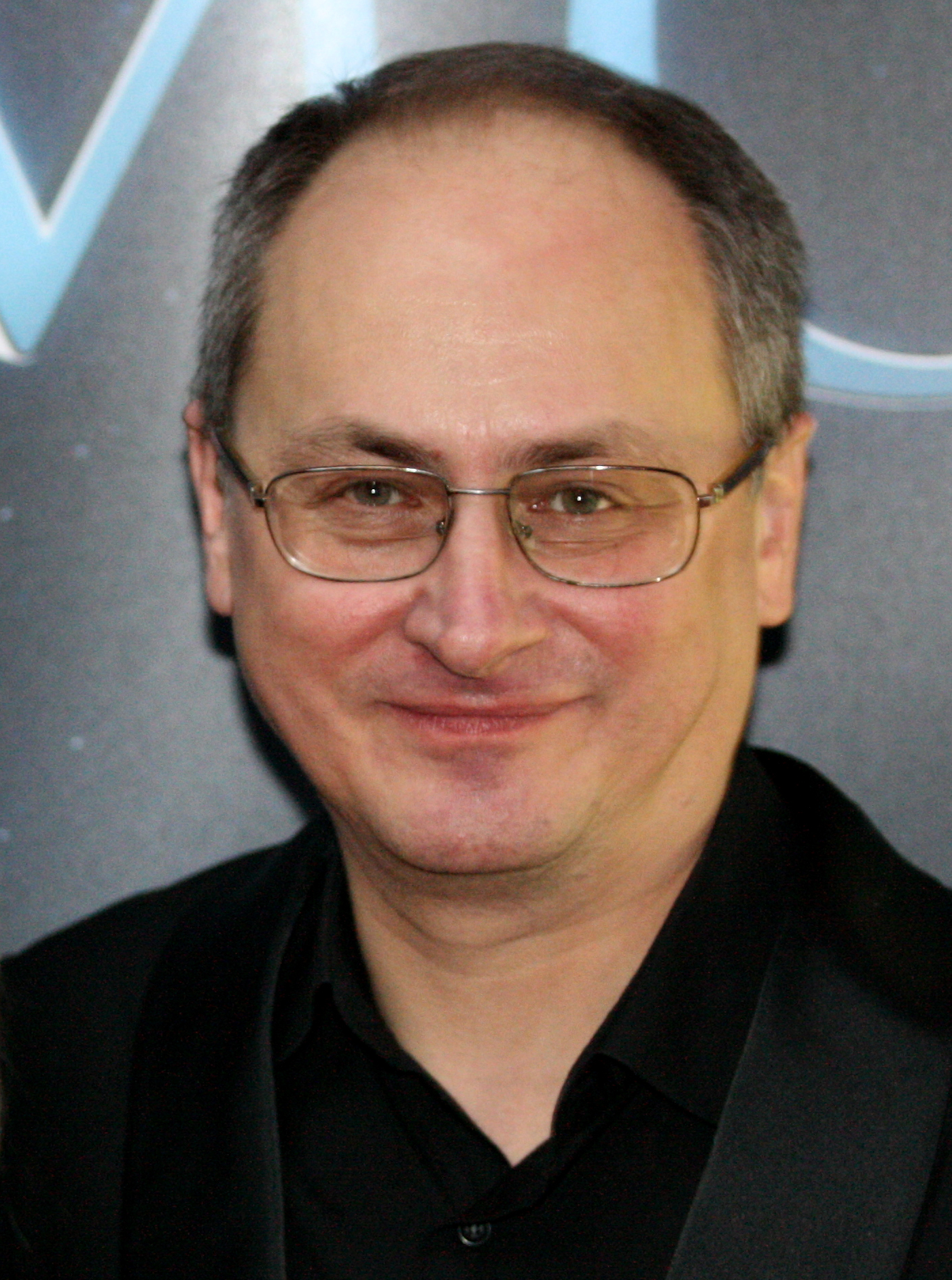
- Born: Nicolae Caranfil; Bucharest, Romanian People's Republic
- Education: I. L. Caragiale National University of Theatre and Film
- Occupations: Film director, screenwriter, actor
- Years active: 1983–present

Nae Caranfil (Romanian pronunciation: [ˈna.e karanˈfil]; also Nicolae Caranfil) is a Romanian film director and screenwriter. He is known for his films Closer to the Moon (2013) and 6,9 pe Scara Richter (2016).

== Early life and education ==
Born in Bucharest, Nae (Nicolae) Caranfil is the son of Romanian film historian and critic Tudor Caranfil.

He graduated in 1984 from the Caragiale Academy of Theatrical Arts and Cinematography (UNATC) in Bucharest, where he has also taught as a professor.

== Career ==
In the beginning of his career Caranfil directed only short films: Venice in September (1983), Thirty Years of Insomnia (1984), and Backstage (1988). Caranfil made his feature film debut with E Pericoloso Sporgersi (1993) and continued with road movie comedy Asfalt tango starring Charlotte Rampling (1996) and with Dolce far niente (1998). His movie Filantropica (2002) was a critical success and increased Caranfil's popularity. Some consider Nae Caranfil to be the best Romanian director of the 1990s. Nae Caranfil wrote the screenplay for all his movies and worked on the music for the first two of them (E Pericoloso Sporgersi and Asfalt-tango).

In 2011, Caranfil began production on the English-language feature film Closer to the Moon. An early version of the script entitled Alice în Țara Tovarășilor (Alice in the Land of Comrades) won a grant of €576,600 from the National Centre of Cinema in 2007. The story is based on the 1959 bank robbery in Communist Romania for which a group known as the Ioanid Gang were convicted and sentenced to death. As they awaited execution, the prisoners were forced to film a reenactment of their crime. Closer to the Moon stars Mark Strong, Vera Farmiga, Harry Lloyd, Joe Armstrong, Christian McKay, Tim Plester, Anton Lesser, and Allan Corduner. Filming took place in Bucharest in the autumn of 2011. Closer to the Moon premiered at the Making Waves: New Romanian Cinema festival at Lincoln Center on 29 November 2013. Variety called the film "a surprisingly entertaining black comedy."

== Awards ==
- 2009 Gopo Award for The Rest Is Silence
- 2003 Würzburg International Filmweekend – Audience Award for Filantropica
- 2002 Mons International Festival of Love Films – Young European Jury Award for Filantropica
- 2002 Paris Film Festival – Public Prize for Filantropica
- 2002 Wiesbaden goEast – Special Jury Award for Filantropica
- 1998 Namur International Festival of French-Speaking Film – Golden Bayard for Best Screenplay for Dolce far niente
- 1993 Montpellier Mediterranean Film Festival – Critics Award for E Pericoloso Sporgersi

== Filmography as director ==
- 2016 6,9 pe Scara Richter
- 2013 Closer to the Moon
- 2007 The Rest Is Silence
- 2002 Filantropica
- 1998 Dolce far niente
- 1996 Asphalt Tango
- 1993 E pericoloso sporgersi
- 1983 Frumos e în septembrie la Veneția
