= List of Romanian plays =

List of Romanian plays:

== 0-9 ==
- ...escu (1933), by Tudor Mușatescu

== A ==
- A doua conștiință by Barbu Ștefănescu Delavrancea
- A doua tinerețe (1922), by Mihail Sorbul
- A murit Bubi (1948), by Tudor Mușatescu
- A treia caravelă, by Iosif Naghiu
- A treia țeapă, by Marin Sorescu
- Abecedarul, by Dumitru Matcovschi
- Acești îngeri triști (1969), by Dumitru Radu Popescu
- Acești nebuni fățarnici (1971), by Teodor Mazilu
- Acord familiar (1935), by Victor Ion Popa
- Act venețian (1918-1946), by Camil Petrescu
- Adam și Eva (1963), by Aurel Baranga
- Al patrulea anotimp, by Horia Lovinescu
- Alegeri anticipate, by Tudor Popescu
- Amanta mortului or Noua și adevărata Casă cu Țoape (1979-2009), by Puși Dinulescu
- America și acustica (2007), by Vlad Zografi
- American Dream, by Nicoleta Esinencu
- Amoruri anormale (1908-1909), by Mihail Sorbul
- Anton Pann (1964), by Lucian Blaga
- Apostolii (1926), by Liviu Rebreanu
- Apus de soare (Trilogia Moldovei, 1909) by Barbu Ștefănescu Delavrancea
- Arca lui Noe (1944), by Lucian Blaga
- Arma secretă a lui Arhimede (2003), by Dumitru Solomon
- Ave Maria (1947), by Mircea Ștefănescu
- Avram Iancu (1934), by Lucian Blaga
- Avram Iancu (1978), by Mircea Micu

== B ==
- Baronulțț, de Mihail Sorbul
- Băiatul cu floarea (1978), by Tudor Popescu
- Bălcescu (1948), by Camil Petrescu
- Bani de dus, bani de-ntors (1999-2001), by Puși Dinulescu
- Banii n-au miros, by Pașcu Balaci
- Bogdan Dragoș, by Mihai Eminescu
- Boală incompatibilă, by Tudor Popescu
- Borgia (1936), by Alexandru Kirițescu
- Boul și vițeii, by Ion Băieșu
- Bunicul și Artre cu litere de platină, de Paul Cornel Chitic
- Burtă Verde (1952), by Tudor Mușatescu
- Buzunarul cu pâine, de Matei Vișniec
- Bătrânul (1920), by Hortensia Papadat-Bengescu

== C ==
- Cadrilul (1919), by Liviu Rebreanu
- Caii la fereastră (1987), by Matei Vișniec
- Cantonament buclucaș (1942), by Victor Ion Popa
- Capul de rățoi (1938), by George Ciprian
- Caragiale în vremea lui (1955), by Camil Petrescu
- Casa cu doua fete (1946), by Mircea Ștefănescu
- Casa de la Miezul Nopții or Paiața sosește la timp (1993), by Fănuș Neagu
- Casa Mare (1967), by Ion Druță
- Cavalerii Mesei Pătrate, by Tudor Popescu
- Căderea – trei moduri de sinucidere (1993), by Viorel Savin
- Călătorie de vis, by Tudor Popescu
- Ceasul (1916), by Nicolae Iorga
- Celuloid (1968), by Iosif Naghiu
- Cerul și cârtița (1982), by Ștefan Dumitrescu
- Cezar, măscăriciul piraților (1968), by Dumitru Radu Popescu
- Chirița în Iași sau două fete ș-o neneacă (1850), by Vasile Alecsandri
- Chirița în provincie (1855), by Vasile Alecsandri
- Chirița în voiagiu (1865), by Vasile Alecsandri
- Chirița în balon (1875), by Vasile Alecsandri
- Cine l-a ucis pe Marx? (1998), by Horia Gârbea
- Cîinele-cîrciumar (1925), by Victor Ion Popa
- Cîntec din fluier (1963), by Paul Everac
- Ciuta (1922), by Victor Ion Popa
- Citadela sfărâmată, by Horia Lovinescu
- The Chairs (1952), by Eugène Ionesco
- Cocoșul negru, de Victor Eftimiu
- Comedia zorilor (1930), by Mircea Ștefănescu
- Concurs de frumusețe (1979), by Tudor Popescu
- Conu Leonida față cu reacțiunea (1880), by Ion Luca Caragiale
- Coriolan Secundus, de Mihail Sorbul
- Crinul vieții, de Victor Eftimiu
- Cronica personală a lui Laonic, de Paul Cornel Chitic
- Cruciada copiilor (1930), by Lucian Blaga
- Cuiul lui Pepelea (1935), by Victor Ion Popa
- Cuminecătura (1925), by George Mihail Zamfirescu

== D ==
- D-ale carnavalului (1885), by Ion Luca Caragiale
- Dansatoarea, gangsterul și necunoscutul (1958), by Victor Bârlădeanu
- Danton (1924-1925), by Camil Petrescu
- Daria (1935), by Lucian Blaga
- Despărțire la marele zbor (ro) (1982), by Romulus Bărbulescu și George Anania
- Despot Vodă (1880), by Vasile Alecsandri
- Desu și Kant, by Ion Băieșu
- Dezertorul (1917), by Mihail Sorbul
- Dictatorul (1945), by Alexandru Kirițescu
- Dresoarea de fantome, by Ion Băieșu
- Doamna Bovary sînt ceilalți (1993), by Horia Gârbea
- Domnișoara Nastasia (1927), by George Mihail Zamfirescu
- Don Juan moare ca toți ceilalți, by Teodor Mazilu
- Dona Diana, comedie în gustul Renașterii în zece tablouri după Moreto (1938), by Camil Petrescu
- Dona Juana (1947), by Radu Stanca
- Dragoste la prima vedere (1984), by Lucia Verona
- Drum bun, scumpul meu astronaut (1962), by Victor Bârlădeanu
- Duet (1970), by Andi Andrieș
- Dulcea ipocrizie a bărbatului matur (1980), by Tudor Popescu

== E ==
- Elena Dragoș (1863), by Gheorghe Asachi
- The Evangelists (2005), by Alina Mungiu-Pippidi
- Epoleții cu busolă (2005), by Valentin Busuioc
- Eroii noștri (1906), by Mihail Sorbul
- Eu când vreau să fluier, fluier (If I Want to Whistle, I Whistle, 1997), de Andreea Vălean
- Eu hoț, tu hoț, ei bandiți!, by Tudor Popescu
- Europa aport - viu sau mort, by Paul Cornel Chitic
- Există nervi, by Marin Sorescu
- Explozie întârziată (1963), by Paul Everac

== F ==
- Fantomiada, de Ion Băieșu
- Farsa (1994), by Răzvan Petrescu
- Fata ursului (in Duhul pământului), by Vasile Voiculescu
- Fântâna Blanduziei (1884), by Vasile Alecsandri
- Fântânile (ro) (1988), by Romulus Bărbulescu and George Anania
- Ferestre deschise (1963), by Paul Everac
- Fericire Loto Pronosport, by Tudor Popescu
- Fii cuminte, Cristofor! (1965), by Aurel Baranga
- Fluierând pe Golgota în sus, de Tudor Popescu
- Florentina (1925), by Alexandru Kirițescu
- Focurile de pe comori (1923), by Tudor Mușatescu
- Frumos este în septembrie la Veneția, by Teodor Mazilu
- Fugind de Charybdis (1912), by Pompiliu Păltănea
- Funcționarul de la domenii, by Petre Locusteanu

== G ==
- Gaițele (1932), by Alexandru Kirițescu
- The Gas Heart (French: Le Cœur à gaz), by Tristan Tzara
- Geamandura (1950), by Tudor Mușatescu
- Ghicește-mi în cafea (1938), by Victor Ion Popa
- Ginere de import (1997), by Viorel Savin
- Gluga pe ochi, de Iosif Naghiu
- Goana după fluturi (1967), by Bogdan Amaru
- Grand Hotel Europa (1998), by Lucia Verona
- Greșeala (1997), by Viorel Savin

== H ==
- Hagi-Tudose (1913), by Barbu Ștefănescu Delavrancea
- Haiducii, by Victor Eftimiu
- Handkerchief of Clouds (1924), by Tristan Tzara

== I ==
- Iată femeia pe care o iubesc (1943), by Camil Petrescu
- Idolul și Ion Anapoda (1935), by George Mihail Zamfirescu
- Iertarea, by Ion Băieșu
- Inspectorul broaștelor, de Victor Eftimiu
- Insula, by Mihail Sebastian și Mircea Ștefănescu
- Irinel (1912), by Barbu Ștefănescu Delavrancea
- Ioachim - prietenul poporului (1947), by George Ciprian
- Ioana d'Arc (1937), by Mihail Drumeș
- Iona (1968), by Marin Sorescu
- Isabela, dragostea mea (1996), by Vlad Zografi
- Ispita (1979), by Tudor Popescu
- Ivanca (1925), by Lucian Blaga

== Î ==
- În căutarea sensului pierdut, by Ion Băieșu
- Încercarea (1936), by Victor Ion Popa
- Întors din Singurătate, by Paul Cornel Chitic
- Înșir-te mărgărite, de Victor Eftimiu
- Învierea (1925), by Lucian Blaga
- Învierea lui Ștefan cel Mare (1918), by Nicolae Iorga
- Învinșii (1910), by Alexandru Kirițescu

== J ==
- Jocul de-a vacanța (1939), by Mihail Sebastian
- Jocul de dincolo de ploaie (1985), by Viorel Savin
- Jocul vieții și al morții în deșertul de cenușă, by Horia Lovinescu
- Jos Tudorache! Sus Tudorache! (1952), by Mircea Ștefănescu

== K ==
- The Killer (1958), by Eugène Ionesco

== L ==
- Lamentația fructelor (1994), by Viorel Savin
- Letopiseți (1914), by Mihail Sorbul
- Logodnicul (1978), by Lucia Verona
- Luceafărul (Trilogia Moldovei, 1910) by Barbu Ștefănescu Delavrancea
- Lucruri și ființe (1987), by Viorel Savin
- Lumina de la Ulmi, by Horia Lovinescu

== M ==
- Macbett (1972), by Eugène Ionesco
- Madona (1947), by Tudor Mușatescu
- Maestrul, by Ion Băieșu
- Mama (1960), by Dumitru Radu Popescu
- Marcel și Marcel (1923), by Alexandru Kirițescu
- Marele duhovnic, de Victor Eftimiu
- Matei Millo (Căruța cu paiațe) (1953), by Mircea Ștefănescu
- Mârâiala, by Paul Cornel Chitic
- Mephisto (1993), by Horia Gârbea
- Meșterul Manole (1927), by Lucian Blaga
- Meșterul Manole, de Victor Eftimiu
- Michelangelo Buonaroti, de Alexandru Kirițescu
- Micul infern (1948), by Mircea Ștefănescu
- Mielul turbat, de Aurel Baranga
- Mihai Viteazul (1911), by Nicolae Iorga
- Milionar la minut!, by Tudor Popescu
- Mioara (1926), by Camil Petrescu
- Mireasa cu gene false, by Dumitru Radu Popescu
- Mironosițele (1938), by Victor Ion Popa
- Mitică Popescu (1925-1926), by Camil Petrescu
- Moara de pulbere (1988), by Dumitru Radu Popescu
- Moartea unui artist, by Horia Lovinescu
- Mobilă și durere (1980), by Teodor Mazilu
- Mormântul călărețului avar, by Dumitru Radu Popescu
- Morți și vii (2003), by Ștefan Caraman
- Muntele (1977), by Dumitru Radu Popescu
- Mușcata din fereastră (1929), by Victor Ion Popa

== N ==
- Năpasta (1890), by Ion Luca Caragiale·
- Nae Niculae (1928), by George Ciprian
- Negru și roșu, by Horia Lovinescu
- Noaptea - o comedie albastră (1989), by Lucia Verona
- Noțiunea de fericire, by Dumitru Solomon
- Nunta lui Puiu (2003-2005), by Puși Dinulescu

== O ==
- O batistă în Dunăre by Dumitru Radu Popescu
- O casă onorabilă, de Horia Lovinescuâ
- O inspecție școlară, de Dumitru D. Pătrășcanu
- O noapte furtunoasă (1879), by Ion Luca Caragiale
- O sărbătoare princiară, by Teodor Mazilu
- O scrisoare pierdută (1884), by Ion Luca Caragiale
- Occisio Gregorii in Moldavia Vodae tragice expressa (1777-1780), by Samuil Vulcan ?
- Ochiul albastru, de Paul Everac
- Oedip la Delphi (1997), by Vlad Zografi
- Omul care a văzut moartea, de Victor Eftimiu
- Omul cu mârțoaga (1927), by George Ciprian
- Ovidiu (1890), by Vasile Alecsandri

== P ==
- Pană Lesnea Rusalim, de Victor Eftimiu
- Panțarola (1928), by Tudor Mușatescu
- Parada, de Victor Eftimiu
- Paradis de ocazie (1979), by Tudor Popescu
- Paradisul, by Horia Lovinescu
- Pasărea Shakespeare (1973), by Dumitru Radu Popescu
- Patima roșie (1916), by Mihail Sorbul
- Paznicul de la depozitul de nisip (1984), by Dumitru Radu Popescu
- Pescărușul lui Hamlet (2004), by Puși Dinulescu
- Petru sau petele din soare (2007), by Vlad Zografi
- Petru Rareș, by Horia Lovinescu
- Pisica în noaptea Anului Nou (1971), by Dumitru Radu Popescu
- Piticul din grădina de vară (1973), by Dumitru Radu Popescu
- Plicul (1923), by Liviu Rebreanu
- Povârnișul (1915), by Hortensia Papadat-Bengescu
- Povești cu zîne si amanți (2000), by Lucia Verona
- Praznicul calicilor, de Mihail Sorbul
- Prăpastia (1920), by Mihail Sorbul
- Preșul, by Ion Băieșu
- Prof. dr. Omu vindecă de dragoste (1946), by Camil Petrescu
- Profesorul de franceză (1948), by Tudor Mușatescu
- Proștii sub clar de lună (1963), by Teodor Mazilu
- Pygmalion sau aripa frântă a țipătului, de Ștefan Dumitrescu

== R ==
- Răceala, by Marin Sorescu
- Răzbunarea (1918), by Mihail Sorbul
- Răzbunarea pământului (1938), by Nicolae Iorga
- Răzbunarea sufleurului (1937), by Victor Ion Popa
- Răzvan și Vidra (1867), by Bogdan Petriceicu Hasdeu
- Râsul (1981), by Ștefan Dumitrescu
- Reclamație, by Ion Băieșu
- Regele și cadavrul (1998), by Vlad Zografi
- Repetabila scenă a balconului (1996), by Dumitru Solomon
- Rezervația de pelicani (1983), by Dumitru Radu Popescu
- Richard al III-lea se interzice (2005), by Matei Vișniec
- Rosana (1868), by Bogdan Petriceicu Hasdeu

== S ==
- Sam, poveste cu mine, cu tine, cu el (1939), by George Mihail Zamfirescu
- Săru' mâna tanti or Pe pragul despărțirii, de Puși Dinulescu
- Scaunul (1979), by Tudor Popescu
- Scoica de lemn (1967), by Fănuș Neagu
- Secătura mahalalei (1947), by Mircea Ștefănescu
- Secretul atomic (1997), by Lucia Verona
- Setea Muntelui de sare, a trilogy by Marin Sorescu: Iona, Paracliserul, and Matca
- Sfântul Mitică Blajinul (1965), by Aurel Baranga
- Shakespeare în infern (1932), by Victor Ion Popa
- Somnoroasa aventură, by Teodor Mazilu
- Sosesc deseară (1931), by Tudor Mușatescu
- The Star Without a Name (Steaua fără nume) (1942), by Mihail Sebastian
- Strămoșii, de Victor Eftimiu
- Studiu osteologic asupra scheletului unui cal dintr-un mormânt avar din Transilvania (1979), by Dumitru Radu Popescu
- Suflet de fată (1982), by Puși Dinulescu
- Subprefectul by Duiliu Zamfirescu
- Suflete tari (1921), by Camil Petrescu
- Surorile Boga, de Horia Lovinescu

== T ==
- Take, Ianke și Cadîr (1932), by Victor Ion Popa
- Tanța și Costel, de Ion Băieșu
- Titanic-Vals (1932), by Tudor Mușatescu
- Toate mințile mele (2011), by Vlad Zografi
- Trandafirii roșii (1915), by Zaharia Bârsan
- Tristețea vânzătorului de sticle goale, by Ion Băieșu
- Tulburarea apelor (1923), by Lucian Blaga

== Ț ==
- Țara fericirii (1946), by Tudor Mușatescu
- Țara lui Abuliu, de Dumitru Solomon
- Terra 2, by Tudor Popescu
- Țușcă, pușcă, pițigoi (1925), by Victor Ion Popa

== U ==
- Ultima oră, by Mihail Sebastian
- Un haiduc în fustă cadrilată, de Tudor Popescu
- Un lup mâncat de oaie (1947), by George Ciprian
- Uneori liliacul înflorește spre toamnă, by Tudor Popescu

== V ==
- Vara imposibilei iubiri (1966), by Dumitru Radu Popescu
- Vărul Shakespeare, by Marin Sorescu
- Vârsta zero (1974), by Andi Andrieș
- Vecinii soarelui (1960), by Andi Andrieș
- Verbul galben (1968), by Andi Andrieș
- Veverița (1941–42), by Victor Ion Popa
- Viața unei femei (1975), by Aurel Baranga
- Vicleimul (1934), by Victor Ion Popa
- Victima și călăul, by Pașcu Balaci
- Viitorul e maculatura (1999), by Vlad Zografi
- Viforul (Trilogia Moldovei, 1910) by Barbu Ștefănescu Delavrancea
- Vis (1968), by Dumitru Radu Popescu
- Vis de secătură (1946), by Mircea Ștefănescu
- Visul unei nopți de iarnă (1937), by Tudor Mușatescu
- Vlaicu Vodă (1902), by Alexandru Davila
- Vreau să cred și n-am un Dumnezeu, by Tudor Popescu
- Vreau să trăiesc (1937), by Ion Minulescu

== X ==
- XXI scene din viata lui Ștefan, by Ștefan Caraman

== Z ==
- Zamolxe (1921), by Lucian Blaga
- Zapp (1997), by Ștefan Caraman
- Zăpezile de altă dată(2003), by Dumitru Solomon
- Zece milioane (1941–42), by Victor Ion Popa
- Zestrea Ilenuței (1953), by Mircea Ștefănescu
- Zodia balanței (1970), by Paul Anghel

== Bibliography ==
- Istoria literaturii române: dramaturgia, Mircea Ghițulescu, Editura Academiei Române, 2007, ISBN 9732716169, ISBN 9789732716168, 918 pages
- Aurel Sasu (ed.), Dicționarul biografic al literaturii române, vol. I, p. 721-22. Pitești: Editura Paralela 45, 2004. ISBN 973-697-758-7

== See also ==
- List of Romanian playwrights
