= List of Romanian playwrights =

This is a list of Romanian playwrights:

- Vasile Alecsandri (1821-1890)
- Gheorghe Asachi (1788-1869)
- Aurel Baranga (1913-1979)
- Ion Băieșu (1933-1990)
- Ion Luca Caragiale (1852-1912)
- George Ciprian (1883-1968)
- Alexandru Davila (1862-1929)
- Puși Dinulescu (born 1942)
- Victor Eftimiu (1889-1972)
- Paul Everac (1924-2011)
- Horia Gârbea (born 1962)
- Bogdan Petriceicu Hasdeu (1838-1907)
- Eugène Ionescu (1909-1994)
- Alexandru Kirițescu (1888-1961)
- Petre Locusteanu (1883-1919)
- Paul Ioachim (1930-2002)
- Tudor Mușatescu (1930-1980)
- Victor Ion Popa (1895-1946)
- Dumitru Radu Popescu (n. 1935)
- Mihail Sebastian (1907-1945)
- Dumitru Solomon (1932-2003)
- Mihail Sorbul (1885-1966)
- Marin Sorescu (1936-1997)
- Barbu Ștefănescu Delavrancea (1858-1918)
- Matei Vișniec (born 1956)
- Ana Maria Bamberger (born 1966)

== See also ==
- List of Romanian writers
- List of Romanian plays
- List of playwrights by nationality and year of birth
