= Mihaela Mitrache =

Romanian actress

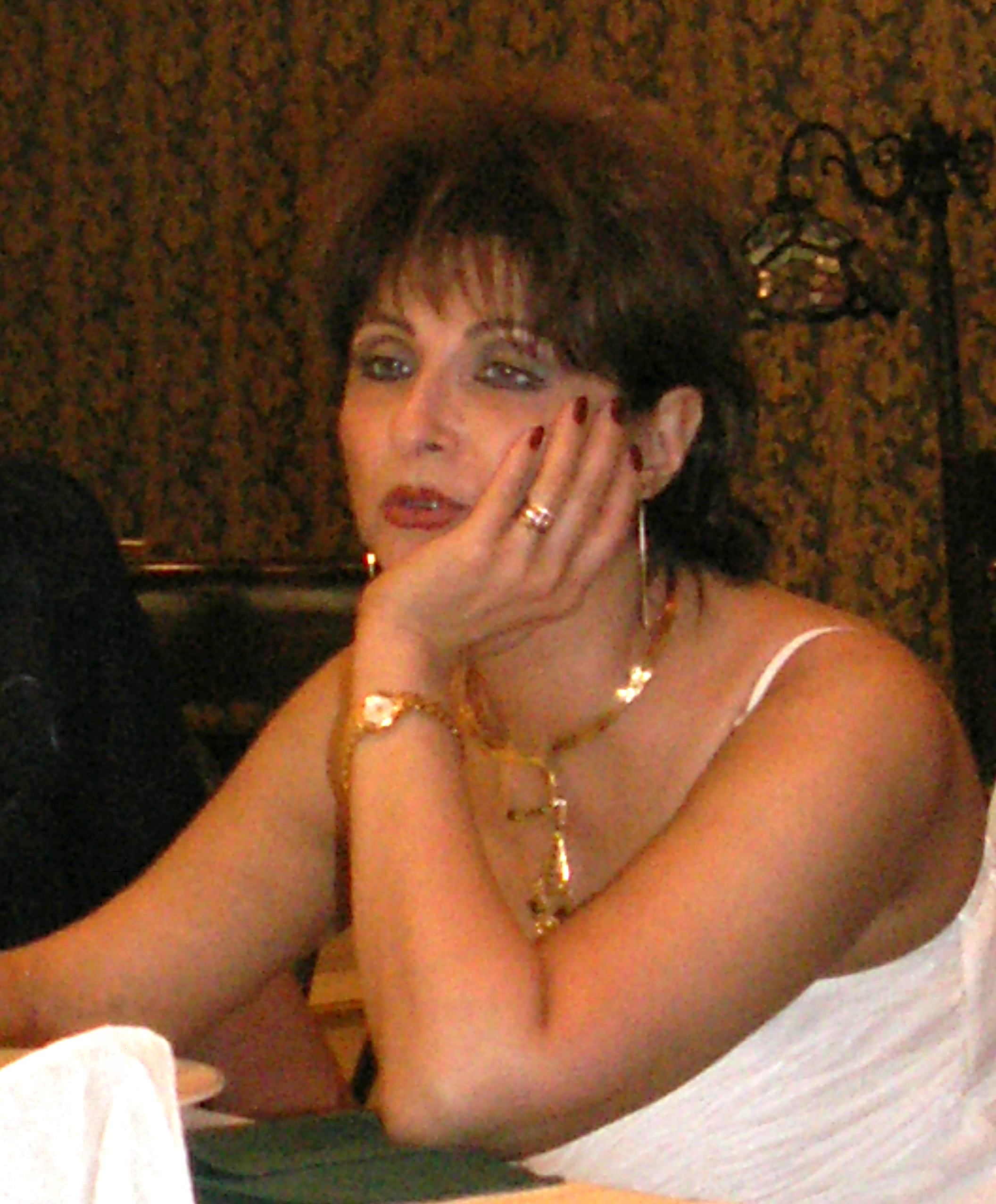
- Born: 8 July 1955; Bucharest, Romanian People's Republic
- Died: 18 February 2008 (aged 52); Balotești, Ilfov County, Romania
- Resting place: Ghencea Cemetery, Bucharest
- Other name: Mihaela Mitraki
- Education: Caragiale National University of Theatre and Film
- Occupations: Movie and theatre actress
- Years active: 1978–2004

Mihaela Mitrache (aka Mihaela Mitraki; July 8, 1955 – February 18, 2008) was a Romanian movie and theatre actress.

== Biography ==
Born in Bucharest, she graduated from the I.L. Caragiale Institute of Theatre and Film Arts (IATC) in Bucharest in 1978, where she was a student in actor Marin Moraru's class. She made her theatre debut at the Alexandru Davila Theatre in Pitești, as Zamfirița in the play The Magpies by Alexandru Kirițescu. She later acted at the Ion Creangă Theatre and the National Theatre in Bucharest.

Mitrache died in Balotești at age 52, and was buried at the Ghencea Military Cemetery in Bucharest.

== Activity ==
=== Theatre ===
==== National Theatre Bucharest ====
- Merula - The Queue, by Paul Everac, directed by Paul Everac, 2004
- Victoria - Murder for Land, adapted from Dinu Săraru, prepared for stage and directed by Grigore Gonta, 2002
- Fanelly - Trifles at Union, adapted from Ion Luca Caragiale, directed by Gelu Colceag, 2002
- The Auberge lady - Man of La Mancha by Dale Wasserman, directed by Ion Cojar, 2001
- Felicia - Generation of Sacrifice, by Ion Valjan, directed by Dinu Cernescu, 1999
- Pina - The Good and Righteous Satan, by Tudor Popescu, directed by Gelu Colceag and Puiu Ștefan, 1998
- Chiralina - The Ghost, adapted from Panait Istrati, directed by Dan Micu, 1998

==== Ion Creangă Theatre, Bucharest ====
- Vidra - Răzvan and Vidra, by Bogdan Petriceicu Hasdeu
- Jurjea - Bogdan Dragoș, by Mihai Eminescu
- Oana - Terra II, by Tudor Popescu
- Magda - A Youngster Among Youngsters, by Mihai Constantinescu
- Mrs. Murdstone - David Copperfield, adapted from Charles Dickens
- Henriette - Les romanesques, by Edmond Rostand
- Janine - Ce formidabilă harababură, by Eugène Ionesco
- Corcodușa - Țiganiada, adapted from Ion Budai-Deleanu
- Martafița - Goofi's Country, by Matei Vișniec
- The girlfriend - The Dragon, by Evgeny Schwartz

==== Alexandru Davila Theatre, Pitești ====
- Magda - Capital City Stories, by Tudor Mușatescu
- Julieta - Measure for Measure, by William Shakespeare
- Neda - Trimalchio Feast, by Cristian Munteanu
- Miza - Titanic Waltz by Tudor Mușatescu
- Henrietta - The Nacked King, by Evgeny Schwartz
- Magda Minu - The Last Hour, by Mihail Sebastian
- Mitza Baston - D-ale carnavalului, by Ion Luca Caragiale
- Dora - The French Teacher, by Tudor Mușatescu
- Beatrice Rasponi - The Servant of Two Masters, by Carlo Goldoni
- Honey - Who's Afraid of Virginia Woolf?, by Edward Albee
- Sofica - The Computer and the Wine, by Paul Everac
- Margareta - The Magpies, by Alexandru Kirițescu
- Florica - Fantomiada, by Ion Băieșu
- Leria - Meeting again, by Gheorghe Dumbrăvescu
- Zamfirița - The Magpies, by Alexandru Kirițescu, directed by Lia Niculescu; debut

=== Filmography ===
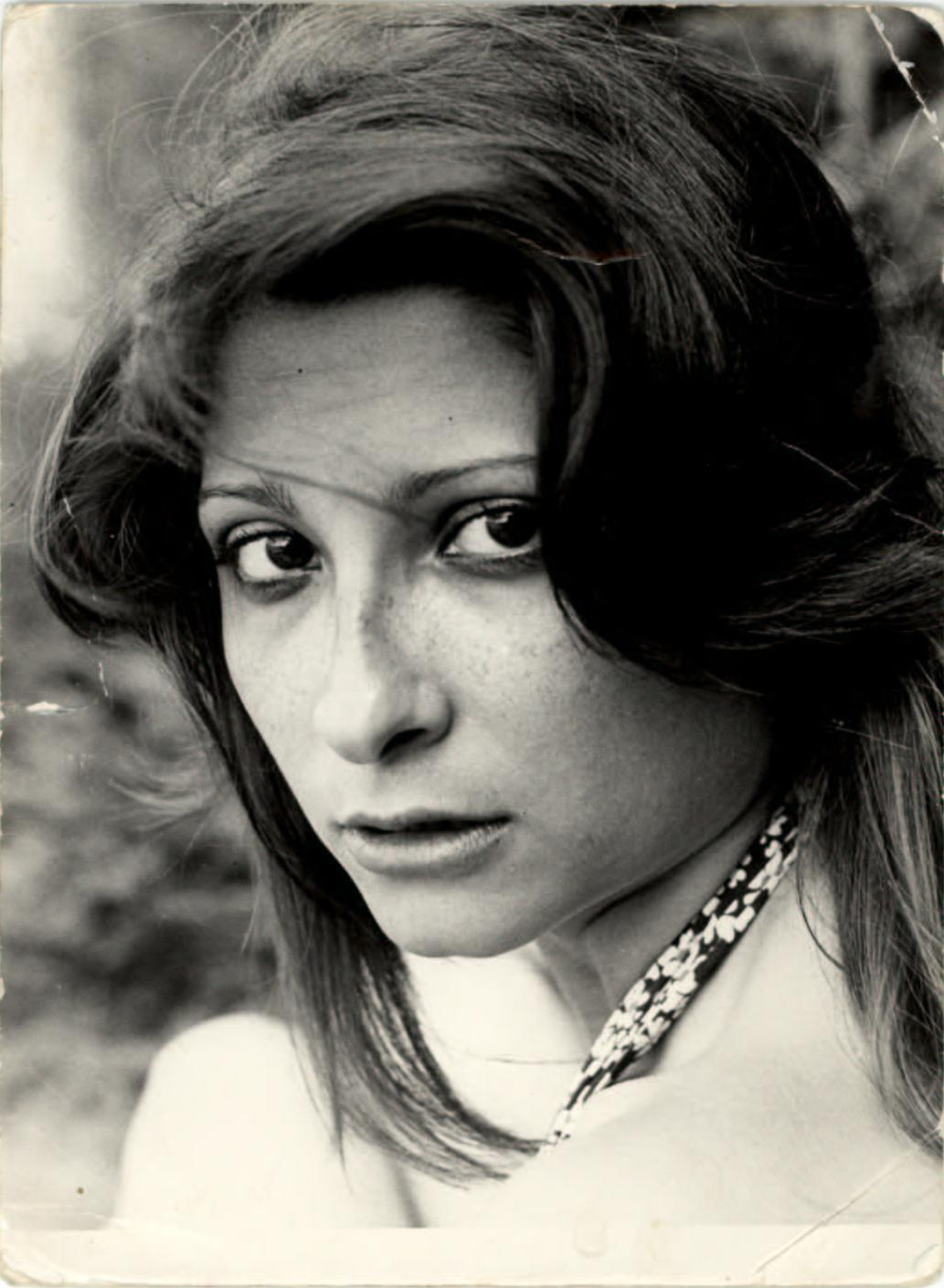
Mihaela Mitrache from the 1970s

==== Romanian movies ====
- Philanthropy, directed by Nae Caranfil, 2002
- The Oak (Balanța), directed by Lucian Pintilie, 1992
- The Death of an Artist, directed by Horea Popescu, 1991
- The Expedition, directed by Mircea Moldovan (1989)
- The Beech Forest, directed by Cristina Nichituș, 1986
- Too Young for Wrinkles, directed by Aurel Miheleș, 1982

==== Romanian-Israeli coproductions ====
- Time of loneliness, directed by Peter Vogel
- Baby-sitter, directed by Ali Nasser
- Milky Way, directed by Ali Nasser

=== Television ===
- Don Juan or the Love of Geometry by Max Friesh, directed by Eugen Todoran

== Nominations and awards ==
- National award for best female role: Honey - Who's afraid of Virginia Woolf at Studio Theatres Festival, Oradea
- Nomination for best female role, Jerusalem Movie Festival: Milky Way, 1997
