= Ciuta =

Ciuta may refer to

== Places ==
- Several villages in Romania, including:

- Ciuta, a village in Măgura, Buzău
- Ciuta, a village in Obreja Commune, Caraş-Severin County
- Ciuta, a village in Bicaz Commune, Maramureș County

== Agriculture ==
- The Ciuta (sheep), a domestic sheep breed from Lombardy, in northern Italy

== Plays ==
- Ciuta (play), a play by Victor Ion Popa
