= Romanian Journal of Political Science =

- Discipline: Political science
- Language: English
- Edited by: Alina Mungiu-Pippidi

Publication details
- History: 2001–present
- Publisher: Romanian Academic Society (Romania)
- Frequency: Biannual
- Impact factor: 0.250 (2014)

Standard abbreviations
- ISO 4: Rom. J. Political Sci.

Indexing
- ISSN: 1582-456X

Links
- Journal homepage; Online archive

Romanian Journal of Political Science is a biannual blind peer-reviewed academic journal covering political science, especially concerning comparative politics, public policy, political economy, or political psychology, covering Romanian or broader Central or South-East European issues. The editor-in-chief is Alina Mungiu-Pippidi (Hertie School of Governance).

According to the Journal Citation Reports, the journal has a 2016 impact factor of 0.458, ranking it 132nd out of 165 journals in the category "Political Science".
