= Horia Gârbea =

Romanian writer

- Born: August 10, 1962 (age 64); Bucharest, Romanian People's Republic
- Occupations: playwright, essayist, journalist, poet, publisher, screenwriter
- Writing career
- Period: 1982–present
- Genres: free verse, lyric poetry, parody, satire, tragicomedy
- Movements: Optzeciști, Postmodernism, Neorealism

Horia-Răzvan Gârbea or Gîrbea (Romanian pronunciation: [ˈhori.a rəzˈvan ˈɡɨrbe̯a]; born August 10, 1962) is a Romanian playwright, poet, essayist, novelist and critic, also known as an academic, engineer and journalist. Known for his work in experimental theater and his Postmodernist contributions to Romanian literature, he is a member of the Writers' Union of Romania (USR), its public relations executive and the head of its Bucharest chapter. Also recognized for his contribution to Romanian humor and his essays, he has published regularly in journals such as Contemporanul, Luceafărul, Ramuri, and Săptămâna Financiară. His career in the media also covers screenwriting for Romanian television stations and the popularization of contract bridge. The author of several scientific works on engineering, Gârbea is also a faculty member at the University of Agronomical Sciences and Veterinary Medicine.

The recipient of several national awards for literature, he received critical attention for plays, short stories and novels which merge intertextuality and parody with neorealistic elements. In his work for the Romanian stage, Gârbea has primarily reworked motifs from Anton Chekhov, Ion Luca Caragiale, Gustave Flaubert, Costache Negruzzi, and various other of his predecessors, addressing contemporary realities. He is also the other of tragicomedies with themes borrowed the 1989 Revolution and his country's post-1989 history. The latter focus is complemented by his works in novel and short prose, which often take the form of political fiction or satire aimed at his writer colleagues. Such contributions have consolidated Gârbea's success with the general public, but have divided critical opinion on the issue of their ultimate literary value.

== Biography ==
=== Early life and career ===
Born in Bucharest, Horia Gârbea is the grandson of Titus Gârbea, a Land Forces general and diplomat of the Kingdom of Romania. He recalls that his grandfather's passion for literature was passed onto him from an early age, when he first heard him reciting poems by Dante Aligheri. The future writer attended the Mihai Viteazul High School, opting for a sciences-based curriculum, but envisioned becoming a writer. At around age 17, as one of the adolescent guests on a Romanian Television talk show hosted by author Mircea Sîntimbreanu, he stated his intention of having two books published by the year 2000 (he recalls: "[Sîntimbreanu], who was a witty but skeptical man, did not encourage me").

Gârbea made his debut in 1982, at age twenty, his poems being published by the student magazine Amfiteatru. He graduated from the Agronomical Science University's Department of Landscaping and Environmental Engineering (1986). A member of the teaching staff at his alma mater since 1987, he received a Doctor of Science diploma from the Politehnica University in 1999. A regular of Cenaclul de luni ("The Monday Literary Club"), founded by literary critic Nicolae Manolescu and journalist Radu Călin Cristea, Gârbea later moved on to the Universitas circle, founded and led by critic Mircea Martin. His early poetry was awarded a 1986 prize by Spain's University of Bilbao (1986).

A turning point in Horia Gârbea's writing career was the Romanian Revolution of 1989, which put an end to the communist regime. In 1990, one of his first works in drama, translated into English as The Serpent, was performed by the British Royal Court Theatre. A year later, Pescărușul din livada cu vișini ("The Seagull in the Cherry Orchard") was first staged at the Victor Ion Popa Theater, followed in 1992 by the premiere of Funcționarul destinului ("The Clerk of Destiny") with the Bucharest experimental theater company Inoportun. He made his editorial debut in the genre with the 1993 volumes Doamna Bovary sînt ceilalți ("Madame Bovary Are the Others") and Mephisto (a Romanian-language variant of Klaus Mann's 1936 novel). Another one of his plays, Stăpânul tăcerii ("The Master of Silence"), was staged in 1994 by Pitești's Alexandru Davila Theater.

Gârbea's first volume of lyric poetry, Text biografic ("Biographical Text"), saw print in 1996, earning him an award granted by the Sighet Poetry Festival. Also that year, the writer followed up with a second collection of poems, Proba cu martori ("The Confrontation of Witnesses"), which was awarded the yearly prize of the Bucharest Association of Writers (a section of the USR). In 1996, he wrote the script for Ils emménagement ("They Are Moving On"), a French-language street theater performance, which premiered in France. Proba cu martori was followed in 1997 by the short story volume Misterele Bucureștilor ("The Mysteries of Bucharest") and the multiple award-winning novel Căderea Bastiliei (Romanian for "Fall of the Bastille").

Gârbea returned to drama with the 1999 book Decembrie, în direct ("December, Live Broadcast"). It received the Writers' Union Prize for Theater. The student theater company Calandrinon featured his Cărțile ("The Books") in its 2000 program, and the Toma Caragiu Theater in Ploiești did the same with Cafeaua domnului Ministru ("The Minister's Coffee"). In 2001, he published an anthology of texts for the stage: titled Cine l-a ucis pe Marx? ("Who Killed Marx?"), it was a recipient of the Romanian Academy's Ion Luca Caragiale Award with a three-year delay. Also in 2001, his short story collection Enigme în orașul nostru ("Enigmas in Our City") saw print. These were followed the next year by Rață cu portocale ("Duck à l'Orange"), a volume of essays, and, in 2003, by two other books: Vacanță în infern ("A Holiday in Hell"; literary criticism, 2 vols.) and Creșterea iguanelor de casă ("Raising Pet Iguanas"; poetry). The former was shortlisted for the USR Award.

His career in the post-Revolution press began early in 1990, when he was among the writers published by Nouăzeci, a magazine founded by Laurențiu Ulici, Cristian Popescu, and Cătălin Țârlea. Active as a theater critic and chronicler, as well as a contract bridge popularizer, he later had permanent columns in Luceafărul (1990–1995, and again 1998–2001), ArtPanorama (1997–1998), Scena (1998–2001), Monitorul de Iași (1998–1999), Contemporanul (1999–2001), Săptămâna Financiară (after 2005) and the Craiova-based literary magazine Ramuri. His articles were also published by other venues, among them Convorbiri Literare, Cuvântul, România Literară and Ziarul Financiar. In 2001, he joined the editorial staff of Okean, a specialized magazine co-founded by three Romanian theater companies: Bulandra, Nottara, Odeon, and the National Theater Cluj-Napoca. He was also among the first Romanian authors to publish fiction in the new wave of lifestyle magazines, being an early contributor to the local version of Playboy (together with George Cușnarencu, Răzvan Petrescu, and Jean Lorin Sterian). Between 2002 and 2003, he published several works related to his field of expertise in engineering: Structuri și construcții cu izolatori dinamici ("Structures and Constructions with Dynamic Insulation", 2002), Structuri şi construcţii – noţiuni şi calcule de fiabilitate ("Structures and Constructions—Notions and Calculations in Reliability", 2002), Structuri și construcții – curs universitar ("Structures and Constructions—University Lecture", 2003; revised edition 2004).

=== Literary consecration and Writers' Union activities ===
An active member of the Writers' Union since 1994, Horia Gârbea was elected president of its Bucharest chapter in 2003, and appointed head of the Union's public relations branch two years later. As a representative of the Bucharest section, he worked closely with Editura Nouă publishing house in helping to popularize the writings of his fellow association members. Having joined the UNITER association of theatrical professionals in 1993, he also works as a dramaturge, and has first been employed as such by the Toma Caragiu Theater since 1998. His contributions in this field include translations and adaptations of plays by Anton Chekhov (The Cherry Orchard), Pierre Corneille (L'Illusion comique), Dario Fo (We Won't Pay! We Won't Pay!), Pierre de Marivaux (Le Triomphe de l'amour), Molière (The School for Wives), Ayn Rand (Night of January 16th), Fernando Arrabal, Jacques Copi, Eugène Ionesco, John D. MacDonald, Niccolò Machiavelli, Gérald Sibleyras, Tennessee Williams and Stanisław Ignacy Witkiewicz. In 1998, Gârbea also began working in screenwriting, collaborating with several national television stations. He was first employed by Pro TV from 1998 to 2001, working on the variety show Ministerul Comediei and the sitcom La Bloc. He was then affiliated with Prima TV, writing for Romică Țociu and Cornel Palade's Alomania sketch comedy show, and later Național TV, where he contributed to a similar production, Naționala de bere. In 2001, Gârbea was also involved in writing for Antena 1's sitcom Clanul Popeștilor. Between 2002 and 2003, he worked with the public broadcaster TVR Cultural, where he hosted a talk show on cultural issues.

During 2004, authors Horia Gârbea, Valeriu Butulescu, Mircea Ghițulescu, and Mircea Petean traveled to Vietnam, on the invitation of the Vietnamese Writers Union. Their experience in the Far East produced the collective travel account Drumul spre Nghe An ("The Road to Nghe An"), published the same year. Also in 2004, Gârbea premiered his Cleopatra a şaptea ("Cleopatra VII") with the Andrei Mureșanu company of Sfântu Gheorghe, published a new work for the stage—Hotel Cervantes, and oversaw the publishing of Editura Limes' Repetiție fără orchestră ("Rehearsal without an Orchestra"), an anthology of prose pieces by young Romanian authors. His own work also included the 2005 essay collections Arte parţiale ("Partial Arts") and Bridge în 41 de povestiri vesele ("Contract Bridge in 41 Cheerful Stories"). Gârbea was made Knight of Meritul Cultural order through a 2004 presidential decree. In March 2005, as head of the Bucharest Association of Writers, he set up the Romanian version of France's literary festival Le Printemps des Poètes ("Poets' Spring", known locally as Primăvara poeților). A month later, during the Romanian Comedy Festival, his play Leonida XXI was staged by the Comedy Theater.

Also in 2005, Gârbea and the Writers' Union were involved in a polemic with Paul Goma, a novelist and former dissident who lived in France. This came after Viața Românească, a literary magazine managed by the Union, republished fragments from Goma's diary, which caused public outrage for its perceived antisemitism. Gârbea and USR president Nicolae Manolescu both intervened to sanction the publication. In an early interview with Gardianul daily, he spoke of the editorial staff as having displayed "negligence", and noted that replacing the panel of editors was one of the sanctions being considered, while also stating that he felt none of them were "100% responsible" for the incident. Gârbea however dismissed rumors that he and his colleagues were considering disestablishing Viața Românească, noting that the magazine was a historical institution.

The USR's public expression of regret over having tolerated "a text with antisemitic content" caused Goma to threaten with a lawsuit on libel grounds. In reaction, Gârbea stated: "What we are interested in is Viața Românească, a press organ edited by the USR. Paul Goma may believe whatever he likes. It is not him that we are discussing, but the magazine. I see no reason why he would sue me personally." According to an overview of the episode by journalist Ovidiu Șimonca, Horia Gârbea had unwittingly prompted Goma to state his intention of suing the Jewish-Romanian community league, or Federation of Jewish Communities of Romania (FCER). This was because, during the scandal, Gârbea had explained that the FCER's reaction was an incentive in the USR's internal investigation. Goma's claim for reparations from FCER leaders, Șimonca noted, ignored the fact that Gârbea had not disclosed any names.

=== Since 2006 ===
Gârbea published his second novel, Crime la Elsinore ("Murders at Helsingør"), in 2006. Printed the same year, his new drama volume, Divorț în direct ("Live Divorce"), was nominated for another USR award. In late 2007, he participated with fellow writers Doina Ruști and Liviu Ioan Stoiciu in a children's literature project initiated by Editura Paralela 45, which involved rewriting a series of fairy tales in Romanian folklore and Christian mythology. Titled Basme și povești mistice românești repovestite ("Retold Romanian Fairy Tales and Mystical Stories"), it was illustrated with reproductions of children-made Romanian Orthodox icons. His son, Tudor, was born in the same year.

With the 2008 Trecute Vieți de Fanți și de Birlici ("Bygone Lives of Beaus and Aces"), he investigated the history of Romanian literature by focusing on and inventorying literary types. In spring, he participated in the project Scriitori pe calea regală ("Writers on the Royal Road"), organized by the former King of Romania Michael I, the Royal House, the USR, and various other venues for the benefit of award-winning writers. He was also the USR's envoy to the Three Seas Writers and Translators Committee conference on Rhodes, Greece.

The same year, Gârbea voluntarily reduced his contributions to drama and theater criticism, citing his family obligations, alongside a general disappointment with the milieu: "I grew aware that writing for the theater is usually not followed by productions. Although plays I signed were constantly performed, I never had productions at a satisfactory level nor significant material gains, except for translations." Instead, he focused on writing a fantasy novel for the youth, Făt Frumos din lună ("Făt Frumos from the Moon") and a cycle of poems known as Cântecele lui Huppy ("Huppy's Songs"), as well as on reviewing for publishing the memoirs of his grandfather Titus Gârbea. Working with Editura Tritonic publishing house, Gârbea also coordinated an anthology of political fiction, in which he included his own novella Detestarea naţiunii ("Detesting the Nation").

In 2010, Editura Limes published Fratele mai deştept al lui Kalaşnikov ("Kalashnikov's Smarter Brother"), his new volume of short prose. The same year, Gârbea visited Azerbaijan, invited by the Heydar Aliyev Foundation, and published some of his impressions in Revista 22. His larger travel writing, published by the same foundation as Azerbaijan – The Living Flame (in English, Romanian, German), was officially launched at the Frankfurt Book Fair (October 2010). In April 2011, Gârbea and fellow writer Ruxandra Cesereanu were in Israel, attending the Nisan Poetry Festival in Maghar.

== Work ==
=== Cultural context and Postmodernist reinterpretations ===
Committed to Postmodernism, Gârbea debuted as a member of the Optzeciști group of writers, most of whom reached their creative peak after 1980: together with Mircea Cărtărescu, Traian T. Coșovei, Florin Iaru, Doru Mareș, Radu G. Țeposu, and Ion Stratan, he was part of the Optzeciști nucleus inside Cenaclul de luni. Given his relatively late consecration, Gârbea is nevertheless identified with the 1990s generation of post-Optzecişti. This also reflects Gârbea's own positioning: according to his own statement, the move from one generation group to the other coincided with his leaving Cenaclul de luni and joining Universitas. In 2008, he expressed much criticism for Orbitor, a large-scale novelistic cycle by the Optzeciști group leader Cărtărescu. In her critical overview of Gârbea's contributions, Observator Cultural chronicler Bianca Burţa-Cernat describes him as one among the lesser authors of the 1990s generation, alongside Dan-Silviu Boerescu and Mihail Gălățanu. Writing for the 2007 Columbia University Encyclopedia of Modern Drama, Romanian-born Israeli actor-director Moshe Yassur included Gârbea "among the best known" of post-1989 playwrights "experimenting with post-absurd-surrealist modes of expression." Others in this group are, according to his definition, Radu Macrinici, Alina Mungiu-Pippidi, Alina Nelega, Saviana Stănescu, Matei Vișniec, and Vlad Zografi. In a 2001 overview of the generation's contribution, Nelega herself mentioned Gârbea and the others alongside Valentin Nicolau and Răzvan Petrescu.

A defining characteristic of Gârbea's main works is the reliance on intertextuality, as compliments to his predecessors in drama, novel and poetry. Speaking in 2009, Gârbea himself recalled his stylistic discovery of the 1980s: "It still seemed to me that being a writer meant having visions and struggling to communicate them so that others may have them too. [...] I could not write prose, but I enjoyed writing drama because I had invented something very fun to do: old characters in new situations." Poet and critic Octavian Soviany noted: "Horia Gârbea is a dramatist who builds with a program in mind, placing his stake on the resources of parody and the intertextual play. The parodic here is given birth by the disabused conscience of a postmodern spirit, who knows that all books have been written and therefore only their 'rewriting' [...] is still possible". Commenting on the texts grouped within Cine l-a ucis pe Marx?, literary critic Mircea A. Diaconu placed the intertextual references (which often make a point of transgressing historical reality) in connection with William Shakespeare's phrase "All the world's a stage", since "everything is possible at the level of the text becoming reality". He praises the author for managing to preserve an "absence that imposes", by not making his own intervention felt in the text. Diaconu admits that such an approach could be read as "gratuitously bookish, [where] a line is more important than an event, a pun more important than a murder", but supports the notion that they all display an "existential bearing", accounting for an "intrinsic value." He speaks of the technique as "a vengeance of the theater" on the traditional historical record: "In essence, Horia Gârbea's theater emerges from the textual inconsistency of the world when faced with the consistency of history, or, better yet, from the inconsistency of history and the textual consistency of the world."

=== Generic traits and related polemics ===
Beyond its immediate context, critics see Horia Gârbea's contribution as greatly indebted to the work of 19th century dramatist and humorist Ion Luca Caragiale. According to Diaconu, Caragiale's influence constitutes the "depth" of Gârbea's work, going beyond the "surface level" of intertextual references and tributes. At the same core level, Diaconu identifies the author's debt to Eugène Ionesco, while also judging his manner of "mixing eras, languages, writings, characters or historical figures, fiction and document" to echo the techniques of Argentinian writer Jorge Luis Borges. Another main influence on Gârbea's work is interwar author Mateiu Caragiale, made famous by his cultivated style and eccentric outlook. Critic Dumitru Ungureanu sees this cultural echo as having been filtered by the style of Radu Albala, one of the authors to have been most inspired by the "matein" narratives, and concludes that the lineage places Gârbea on the same level as Cărtărescu and Florin Șlapac.

According to his generation colleague, essayist Dan-Silviu Boerescu, Gârbea "cannot part with the speculative charm of a brain given to bookish games", but closely follows a realistic tradition with his "sarcastic analysis of [...] all everyday weakness." For Boerescu, Gârbea's literature is supported by his sarcasm and his contribution to Romanian humor: "Thin and edgy like a razor, Gârbea's style forgives no one no thing." Soviany also argues that the "rewriting" of texts attempted by the Romanian author is carried by "absurd humor" and "the most unusual (as well as the most hilarious) arrangements of famous characters and quotes". Poet and critic Paul Aretzu writes: "The staple of [Horia Gârbea's] writing is inventive, farcical, the obvious attribute of intelligence and refinement, also displaying bookish support and being enhanced by zestful language. [...] The tendency of visualizing, of sketching portraits, of detailing/dissecting scenes, of verifying orality, the expressive value of the language, reveal the author's dominant structure as a playwright." The alternation of such stylistic traits reflects in part the writer's own parting with the Optzeciști. The focus on everyday issues prompted Cătălin Țârlea to view Gârbea's 1990s prose as a revival of neorealism after the Optzeciști experimentalism. Boerescu however believes this verdict to be "only half right", since the writer continued to employ experimental devices long after 1989, while avoiding the "referential ostentation" of other writers. Appreciation of Gârbea's work was also expressed among older critics and Gârbea's own mentors. Nicolae Manolescu held Gârbea's contribution in high esteem, an, in his 2008 synthesis of Romanian literary history, spoke of him as having "indisputably, the fabric of a dramatist".

In Nelega's view, Gârbea, "one of the truly alive writers of his time", was among the few debuting local playwrights to have their works staged by prominent Romanian directors—Alexandru Darie, Alexandru Hausvater, and Gavril Pinte. Gârbea's fellow România Literară contributor, literary historian Alex. Ștefănescu, contrasted his writings with the "boring" works by some of his contemporaries, and claimed that "directors and actors take pleasure in staging [Gârbea's plays]." Gârbea's work stands out within its cultural and temporal context for its size and diversity. Aretzu sees him as "one of the most ubiquitous authors in present-day literature, [...] gifted with a great availability in processing reality", while critic and academic Nicolae Oprea believes him to be "the most prolific" among the Bucharest-based group formed in the 1990s. Literary reviewer Daniel Cristea-Enache also describes his colleague as "multilateral" who "can adapt himself with great ease to any particular genre's specificity". Writing in 2007, Ștefănescu defined him a "one-man orchestra [...] of the apathetic (and sometimes shy-brazen) Romanian literature of today." According to Moldovan writer Emilian Galaicu-Păun: "As productive as an entire literary school [...], Horia Gârbea is a veritable Stakhanovite of writing, who has dealt in all genres and species". Gârbea is also among the post-1990 Romanian authors to have received recognition abroad. In addition to the performances of The Serpent and Il émmagement, Gârbea's Rață cu portocale has been translated into German by Veronika Dreichlinger (Ente mit Apfelsine, published in 2005). His work was also included into English-, French-, German-, Russian- and Serbian-language anthologies.

There are several controversial aspects to Gârbea's public notoriety, involving reactions against academic verdicts, and objecting to the close relationship between Gârbea and mainstream cultural forums such as the USR. The implications of positive appraisals by these venues were debated by literary critic Bogdan Crețu, who argued that Nicolae Manolescu tended to overrate authors in his proximity, while being dismissive of Vișniec's contribution to drama (which Manolescu had claimed lacked originality). Critic Dan C. Mihăilescu criticized in particular Manolescu's "caprices", suggesting that, in a 2008 synthesis of Romanian literary history, his older colleague had assigned Gârbea's entry undeserved space, more than to a better known novelist like Gib Mihăescu. Also according to Mihăilescu, Cărtărescu may have had his rival Gârbea in mind when reproaching Manolescu that he had insisted on writers who were not at all worthy of recognition. Nicolae Oprea saw Gârbea as apparently "uninhibited" in matters of literary discourse, but critically noted that the poet was also preoccupied, "to the point of obsession", with his own cultural imprint (citing as proof the fact that, in its original version, Creşterea iguanelor de casă features the English-language versions of five poems, translated by Gârbea's own hand). A highly critical voice is that of Bianca Burţa-Cernat. She suggests that, in adopting all forms of writing, Gârbea displays "an implausible self-certainty". She polemically connects the critical appreciation with his status as a "good colleague" and "devoted shadow" of other writers, noting that Gârbea's notoriety is ensured by a promotional system with "all the stakes" and "all the pulleys", as well as by "the argument of prolificity", but that these attributes also surpass his actual value.

=== Plays ===
Usually assigned by their author the name of "texts", in preference over "plays", several among Gârbea's earliest works for the stage are Postmodern reworkings of classical motifs, fashioned into new statements about the limits of literature. His Pescăruşul din livada cu vişini is a personal take on Anton Chekhov's Cherry Orchard and Seagull. According to the author's own assessment, the text fits in with a Chekhovian homage trend among Romanian dramatists, also including Iosif Naghiu's Armurierul Cehov ("Chekhov the Armorer") and Vișniec's La machine Tchekhov ("The Chekhov Machine"). Soviany singles out the text as an answer to claims that parody is always inferior to its models, by identifying its original motifs in a new statement about theater itself: "[the play], which is without doubt ascribable to the formula of 'apocalyptic' theater, draws its substance from mixing intertextual parody with an eschatologic vision, suggesting the regression (of world and literature) into the primordial mud. Putting to use [...] the deluge myth, the dramatist this time imagines an apocalypse of fiction (of the theater), during which the characters [...] are slowly being swallowed by the mud flows of subterranean waters, which could imply that literature (fiction) unavoidably secretes its own death, so that writing (being written) and dying end up being perfect synonyms." In this analogy between literature and death, Soviany argues, one finds "the most profound message of Horia Gârbea's theater". In Doamna Bovary sînt ceilalți, the theme and protagonists are borrowed from Gustave Flaubert's 1857 novel, reused by the author to make a statement about drama itself and combined with elements from Jean-Paul Sartre's No Exit. In addition to such themes, Mircea A. Diaconu sees Gârbea's reflection on the conflict between history and fiction as personified by the lead character in Stăpânul tăcerii: the Egyptian god Thoth, who bestows the gift of language on man, is depicted as "the prototype of traitors."

Published ten years after the Romanian Revolution, Decembrie, în direct recounts a changing of roles between torturer and victim, set to the background of political turmoil. In the first part, it introduces the two protagonists: a failed boxer turned interrogator for the main communist repressive structure, the Securitate, who confronts his prisoner, a renegade nomenklatura member who has become a dissident. What is supposed to be an ordeal for the latter turns into a revelation for the former: the dissident is successful in assuring his interrogator that communism is doomed, and both flee the prison to partake in the victorious Revolution. The second part sees the dissident transformed into an agent for the reformed Intelligence Service, who displays no qualms about capturing, tormenting, and finally killing his former associate. Historiographer and critic Ruxandra Cesereanu connects the outcome with a notoriously violent episode in Romania's communist history, the brainwashing experiment carried out by the Securitate in Pitești Prison: "The paradox and moral-antimoral of Horia Gârbea's play is that the victim [...] proves himself tougher, more of an executioner, than his torturer. This means that the lines between victim and executioner are blurred and that, ultimately, the reeducation experiment in Pitești Prison (1949–1952), when victims were forced into becoming torturers, has succeeded. The antimoral in Gârbea's play is, however, all the more tough as the victim here becomes a torturer without being made to do so." Cesereanu ranks it and Radu Macrinici's T/Țara mea (approx. "My Dead Weight/Country") among the post-1989 dramatic texts to have "brought up [...] the Securitate issue, in a trenchant and even revelatory manner". Gârbea's fellow playwright Alina Nelega notes that Decembrie, în direct is his first entirely original text for the stage, and rates it over intertextual texts from the same period.

Published alongside Decembrie, în direct, Capul lui Moțoc ("Moțoc's Head") reinterprets Alexandru Lăpușneanu, a novella by the Romanian classic Costache Negruzzi, which romanticizes events in Moldavia's medieval history. Integrating further allusions to Romanian folklore (the Meșterul Manole myth), Shakespeare and various others, it is also seen by Alina Nelega as a close rendition of Ion Luca Caragiale's style. The protagonist, a treacherous Moldavian boyar by the name of Moţoc, uses a discourse rich in political imagery, and towards the end of the play reveals himself as an alter ego of communist theorist Karl Marx. Nelega is critical of the text, arguing that it "does not surpass the gratuitousness of petty pokes" and is "more burlesque than absurd", concluding: "I fear that Gârbea did not know how to end his play and quickly fabricated, deus ex machina, the similitude of a profound sense where there was nothing."

The three-character comedy and satire Cafeaua domnului Ministru, seen by poet and literary chronicler Emil Mladin as one "of morals", turns its attention to Romania's political scene, showing the stormy encounter between a matron, a female secretary and a politician. The dialogues are seen by Mladin as "a parody of the discourses with which just about any television station assassinates us", and, Nelega writes, "the lampoon has precise targets". The story pokes fun at the Social Democratic Party and Romanian Democratic Convention governments of the post-1989 period, and, according to dramatist and theater critic Mihaela Michailov, was "adequate" in the context of 2000 elections. Michailov highlights the play's symbolism as illustrating "the stupidity of the political mechanism", whose sphere is turned into "a sort of no man's land where everything is possible." According to Alex. Ştefănescu, productions of Cafeaua domnului Ministru receive as much applause as "a rock music recital." With Leonida XXI, the author returned to intertextual reworkings, this time introducing his style to the works of Ion Luca Caragiale, Conu Leonida faţă cu reacţiunea and O scrisoare pierdută. The play was notably used as teaching material for student actors training at the Caragiale Academy under Mircea Albulescu, who called it "extremely interesting".

=== From Căderea Bastiliei to Creșterea iguanelor de casă ===
With his debut novel Căderea Bastiliei, Gârbea produces a satirical portrayal of his fellow Romanian writers, disguising their real names with anagrams or other word play. Alex. Ștefănescu, who writes that such portrayals caused "great agitation in the literary world", cites the author's own mock-disclaimer: "The identification of some characters with real person constitutes an abuse of interpretation which the author intends to fight off with any legal means." Ştefănescu however cautions against reading Căderea Bastiliei purely as a roman à clef, since the inspiration from "writers' deeds" is "capricious" and the resemblance with real persons "partial". A similar opinion was voiced by poet and journalist Cornelia Maria Savu, who compared the narrator to a puppeteer and further assessed: "Horia Gârbea does not hate his characters, does not love them, he understands them. And by understanding them, he offers them a few moments to evolve with no strings." Reviewing the work from a stylistic point of view, Paul Aretzu analyzes the intrusion of "intertextual indulgences" throughout the work, identifying allusions to Ion Luca Caragiale, Franz Kafka, Ioan Alexandru Brătescu-Voineşti and others, while also noting the presence of experimental methods echoing James Joyce's Ulysses. Ştefănescu attributes such presences to parody, noting in passing the introduction of situations and even entire passages from Kafka's Metamorphosis and Albert Camus' The Plague.

The narrative delves into Bucharest's bohemian environment, its heroes being vagrants, misfits or alcoholics who lead tragicomic lifestyles. The plot, deemed "to die for" by Galaicu-Păun, notably shows writer and former inmate Aldu Rădulescu seducing literary chronicler Alteea Fleciu, as revenge for a negative review of his work. In Paul Aretzu's view, the manner in which such developments are presented constitutes "a continuous demonstration of brilliant intelligence and spectacular linguistic imagination." He commends a chapter of the book, which discusses how groups of people differentiated by their respective drinking cultures, for being "a sort of poem dedicated to the kinds of drink and drunks in a small alcoholic town", while noting that a similar section, dedicated to the attitudes of writers when faced with fatal diseases, "creates, with the means of the grotesque, a sui generis mythology of the writers' caste". The latter episode is praised by Ştefănescu for its "irresistible" black humor and its "devilish verve". The same commentator states: "The novelist has a joy of writing that transmits itself to the reader. After you finish reading this novel about the ugliness of (literary) life [...], you feel, paradoxically, the joy of living, of communicating, of partaking in the captivating spectacle of being." In Artezu's account, those parts of Căderea Bastiliei in which Gârbea discusses the annual competition for literary prizes offer evidence both a "captivating" humorous focus on everyday occurrences and an "innocent cynicism, characteristic for the author". He argues: "With all the signs of his emotional involvement [...], the author also exercises, through correlations [and] quotes, the function of depersonalization, of estrangement, of laughing at one's misfortunes, of projecting oneself into clichés, [...] of surrogate existence." Literary reviewer Cosmin Ciotloş issues a more reserved verdict on the text: in his view, the episodes of Căderea Bastiliei are primarily "charades", whose main quality is being "droll".

Overall, Horia Gârbea's contribution to short fiction is described by Alex. Ştefănescu as "ingenious" and "endearing". The political fiction of Enigme în oraşul nostru is described by Boerescu as "a multitude of sub-worlds" structured around "framework situations", moving between the "petty politics of the day" (targeting the Social Democratic Party) and ironic parables or dystopias. Boerescu writes: "The author cannot refrain from endlessly staging acts and short plays or inserting lines with an obvious dramatic hue". The same commentator identifies in the stories several allusions, homages or intertextual borrowings, from the "semiotic games" of Umberto Eco to a "landscape of luxuriant vegetation" characteristic for the Latin American Boom writers. This symbolism is coupled with allusions to Romanian literary life: the final story in the collection, Motanii din bibliotecă ("The Tomcats in the Study Hall"), speculates about the future of Gârbea's generation, and depicts bibliophiles keeping pets named after the leading literary critics of the 1980s and '90s.

Among his poetry collections, Creşterea iguanelor de casă drew attention for transferring the intertextual and parodic conventions into a lyrical format, mostly free verse. According to Ştefănescu, it and his other poetry collections are "better than those by most contemporary authors who emphatically recommend themselves as poets." Nicolae Oprea noted in particular the reworking of a motif borrowed from Sibiu Circle poet Ştefan Augustin Doinaş and his Mistreţul cu colţi de argint: the "prince from the Levant", whom Gârbea transfers into the destitute world of garbage collectors. Part of it reads:

dimineaţa pe la ora patru pe nemâncate
îi aduna prinţul-poet pe gunoieri
nu mai făcea apelul erau toţi
şi îi întreba
bă voi ziceţi că omu-i o lumină
da moşule
ziceau aia este
bine scrâşnea prinţul-poet
mai mult prinţ vai de poezia lui
bine marş la treabă
şi plecau să măture ce să facă

Translation:

morning round four on an empty stomach
the prince-poet would gather the garbage men
he wouldn't call them out they were all there
and would ask them
you people say that man is a light
yes dude
they said that's what man is
fine gnashed the prince-poet
or rather just prince his sorry poetry
fine shoo back to work
and they started sweeping what else could they do

Oprea also highlighted ironic and dismissive borrowings from Romania's national poet Mihai Eminescu, and from poets laureate such as Octavian Goga and Vasile Alecsandri, as well as an actual lineage from the black humor of 1930s Surrealists. He sees a direct link between Gârbea and the Romanian Surrealist group's Gellu Naum, and beyond, to the "existential" absurdism of Ionesco and Kafka. Also according to Oprea, such texts "are raised as collages of everyday images and bookish suggestions, well tied to each other, to the point where their articulation into colloquial speech puts to use the technique of reabsorbing the dramatic element and the narrative nucleus of balladesque nature into the sphere of pure lyricism."

=== Crime la Elsinore and Trecute Vieţi de Fanţi şi de Birlici ===
Crime la Elsinore is a return to prose satire, in this case directed at the theatrical environment. The setting is a fictional theater in provincial Călăraşi, deriving its name from the Getic ruler Dromichaetes, and the protagonists, Cosmin Ciotloş notes, are composite portrayals rather than the "masked" characters of Căderea Bastiliei. He argues: "Whichever way you look at it, set free from the contextual interpretations exercised in reading tabloids, the novel stands only to gain." The narrative focus is on the kitschy ambition of a failed theater manager, Cosma, who proceeds to conflate all the violent moments of Shakespearean tragedy into a single show of regular proportions. The project is increasingly confused, and the text used by Cosma mixes Shakespeare's lines with quotes from Pierre Beaumarchais, Euripides and Molière, while adopting the format of a detective novel.

Ciotloş reproached Crime la Elsinore for lack of subtlety, in the presence of a "not exactly indispensable" glossary of terms which was published with the book. Although he acknowledges that the writing is "amusing", he also contends that it is "impossible to extend sociologically or connect to some reality", being isolated "in its own world", and displaying "compositional precariousness." He concludes: "A book perfect in its own way, but far from perfection in ours." A similar overview is provided by Burţa-Cernat, who contends that, in taking sides and explaining his intentions, the author adopts "the manner of an untalented journalist", with "see-through" results. She also believes that Gârbea's chief comedic resource is "the cheap anecdote with a trite climax", which she compares with those published by the communist-era magazine Urzica. Additionally, Burţa-Cernat comments on the irony of Cosma's reliance on intertextuality, which she finds similar to Gârbea's own work for the stage. Critic Andrei Terian noted that he disliked almost all the book, because of its author's tendency to humiliate his characters "before us readers are in the least familiarized with them."

In Trecute Vieţi de Fanţi şi de Birlici, Gârbea revisits the main themes of Romanian literature, looking into the biographies of various fictional characters, their lifestyles, personal preferences and social positioning. He himself defined the overview as "a sort of collection of essays on the edge of literary history." One of its chapters compares the tabletop games entertaining such figures, from the contract bridge parties in Camil Petrescu's books and the antiquated card games in Mateiu Caragiale's Craii de Curtea-Veche to the cruder craps and gambling preferred by thieves in Eugen Barbu's novels. Other sections discuss the attitudes toward love in such diverse places as Marin Sorescu's neorealist prose and the fantasy short stories of Mircea Eliade. Likewise, the avatars of violence are depicted between Ion Luca Caragiale's satire D-ale carnavalului, where people threaten to poison each other with sulfuric acid, Anton Bacalbaşa's depictions of officers disciplining their subordinates with the use of belts, and Marin Preda's Moromeţii, where peasants beat each other with clubs. Another part of the book deals with the incidence of failure among intellectual protagonists, and leads Gârbea to conclude that, with the exception of Mihail Sebastian's Accidentul, Romanian narratives generally show their intellectual protagonists incapable of finding their way in life. According to Daniel Cristea-Enache, Gârbea generally and willingly limited the scope of his investigation to canonical and urbane literary realism, avoiding allegorical styles such as Onirism: "the author is not interested in symbolic codification, in the refraction of the characters and their fictional world; but, quite the contrary, in the points and lines at which literature intersects with social life."

In his review of the volume, Emil Mladin deemed it "wonderful" and "an extremely welcome project", noting: "Trecute Vieţi de Fanţi şi de Birlici represents a link which the reader needed in his relationship with the characters of stories relevant both at the time of their writing and today." According to literary critic Silvia Dumitrache, the book creates "new paths in interpretation [...] even when starting from literary locations that are often threatened with turning into clichés." She concludes "Through the playful note he impresses on the book, Horia Gârbea proves that his main intention does not reside in the willingness to impose a new hermeneutic grid on Romanian literature, but in the attempt to demonstrate that the resources of literature can never, ever, be entirely exhausted." Cristea-Enache sees in Trecute Vieţi de Fanţi şi de Birlici "a book as interesting as it is enjoyable [...]. A holiday read, one could say, had this sytagm not been bastardized, in our country, by so many printed works (volumes and journals alike) that offend the reader's intellect."

Outside the critical reevaluation of local literature, Gârbea's work includes short humorous essays about various topics in post-1989 society and modern Romanian culture. One such chapter is built around the polemic between Gârbea and writer Gheorghe Grigurcu, over the issue of what it means for a working artist to be treated unjustly or be privileged. Another fragment documents and ridicules the impact of instant messaging on the Romanian lexis, with the rapid spread of abbreviations such as sal (for salut, "hello"), vb (vorbim, "we'll talk") and ms (mersi, "thanks"). Gârbea also pokes fun at the babytalk-based jargon of parenting magazines, and contrasts its apparent artificiality with the awe he records having personally experienced after the birth of his son Tudor. It reads: "[He] does not inspire in me the image of fragility and fondness, but the force of an entity which benefits from the advantage of The Unknown. When I call him using his human name, he smiles down on me, with devastating irony, so that I may grasp my complete lack of fantasizing ability. No matter what will happen in the future, these winter days [...] shall always remain for me under the sign of having met, for the first time in life, an inexplicable creature."

=== Other works ===
Fratele mai deştept al lui Kalaşnikov, which comprises several stories, received mixed reviews. According to Andrei Terian, the main one, Articolul 96 ("Article 96"), which is about a lecherous politician dating an anorexic model, has the same defects as Crime.... In contrast, Terian notes, Gârbea shows his "sure hand" in other pieces, where he parodies Povestea unui om leneş ("The Story of a Lazy Man") by 19th century Romanian classic Ion Creangă, or where he pokes fun at the 14th century Battle of Rovine, as well as the absurdist Întoarcerea tatei din război. Subiecte ("Father's Return from War. Subjects"), where the same narrative cliché is explored from several conflicting perspectives. According to Terian, the volume as a whole displays influences from poet and satirist Tudor Arghezi, as well as borrowings from fellow parodist Ioan Groşan.

În germană: Der vergessene Traum, în traducerea lui Christian W. Schenk, editura Dionysos Boppard am Rhein/Germany 2020, ISBN 9798625419635;

Azerbaijan – The Living Flame details Gârbea's trip and offers additional insight into the Nagorno-Karabakh conflict between Azerbaijani people and Armenians. It features his poems about Shusha city, the Khojaly Massacre and the Guba mass grave. The texts received criticism from the Armenian Romanian community's Ararat journal: it specifically called "disinformation" the fragments which refer to Azerbaijan's Christian past, and expressed concern over Gârbea's claim that Heydar Aliyev was "a civilizing providential hero".
