= Kirițescu =

Kirițescu is a Romanian language surname. Notable people with the surname include:

- Alexandru Kirițescu (1888–1961), Romanian playwright
- Constantin Kirițescu (1876–1965), Romanian zoologist, educator, and military historian
