= Mungiu =

Mungiu is a Romanian surname. Notable people with the surname include:

- Alina Mungiu-Pippidi (born 1964), Romanian political scientist, academic, journalist, and writer
- Cristian Mungiu (born 1968), Romanian filmmaker
