= Exit the King =

1962 play by Eugène Ionesco

First English edition cover (publ. Grove Press)

Exit the King (French: Le Roi se meurt) is an absurdist drama by Eugène Ionesco that premiered in 1962. It is the third in Ionesco's "Berenger Cycle", preceded by The Killer (1958) and Rhinocéros (1959), and followed by A Stroll in the Air (1963).

== Plot ==
In the other plays of the "Berenger Cycle", Berenger appears as a depressed and insecure everyman who is prone to sentimentality. In Exit the King, he is the solipsistic and belligerent King Berenger the First who was apparently at one point able to command nature and force others to obey his will. According to his first wife he is over four hundred years old. He is informed early in the play that he is dying, and the kingdom is likewise crumbling around him. He has lost the power to control his surroundings and is slowly losing his physical capabilities as well. Through much of the play, he is in denial of his death and refuses to give up power. Berenger's first wife, Marguerite, along with the Doctor, tries to make Berenger face the reality of his impending death. Berenger's second wife, Marie, sympathetically attempts to keep Berenger from the pain of knowing his death is imminent. The king lapses into Berenger's normal sentimentality and eventually accepts that he is going to die. The characters disappear one by one, eventually leaving the king, now speechless, alone with Marguerite who prepares him for the end. Marguerite and then the king disappear into darkness as the play ends.

== Analysis ==
Exit the King is unusual among Ionesco's works in that the plot is linear and focuses on depletion rather than accumulation. Often in Ionesco's plays, the stage is filled with more and more objects or characters; in Rhinoceros, for example, there are gradually more and more rhinoceroses. In this play, however, the kingdom and all the characters slowly disappear. Likewise, the language is generally more straightforward and comprehensible, eschewing Ionesco's tendency toward abundant clichés and nonsense. Ionesco told Claude Bonnefoy in a 1966 interview that Exit the King did not "originate in a dream" as many of his plays did, but was "much more consciously composed. People immediately said: 'Oh! He’s given up the avant-garde, he’s turning classical!' It wasn’t a question of choosing between classicism and the avant-garde. I had quite simply written in a different style because I was on a different level of consciousness".

Ionesco also said the play was composed while he was ill and frightened of death. He was inspired partly by a childhood obsession with death in which Ionesco believed one could simply avoid being sick and live forever. Exit the King was written to be a kind of lesson in death: "I told myself that one could learn to die, that I could learn to die, that one can also help other people to die. This seems to me to be the most important thing we can do, since we’re all of us dying men who refuse to die. This play is an attempt at an apprenticeship in dying".

According to religious historian Mircea Eliade, the play "cannot be fully understood if one does not know the Tibetan Book of the Dead and the Upanishads". Les Essif in Empty Figure on an Empty Stage points out that Exit the King comes closest of all Ionesco's plays to the paradigm of absurdism established by Samuel Beckett. Though Beckett and Ionesco are commonly grouped together under the name "Theatre of the Absurd" because of their shared themes of alienation and the difficulty of communication, Beckett's plays generally present a stripped down, minimalist tableau whereas Ionesco presents a proliferation of chaos. According to Essif, Exit the King is Ionesco's most Beckettian play: "The image of an exterior world fades in cadence with the protagonist’s surrender to the interiority of his consciousness, that is, with the increasing intensification of his inward-turning. The vertical axis of the subjective abyss runs counter to the horizontality of the external world".

== Productions ==
It was first presented in London by the English Stage Company at the Royal Court Theatre in 1963. It premiered on 12 September 1963 and starred Alec Guinness as the King, Googie Withers as Queen Marguerite, Natasha Parry as Queen Marie and Eileen Atkins as Juliette. It was directed by George Devine.

The play was first produced on Broadway by the APA-Phoenix Repertory Company at the Lyceum Theatre in 1968 from 9 January to 22 June. The production was directed by Ellis Rabb and starred Richard Easton as the King, Patricia Conolly as Queen Marie, Eva Le Gallienne as Queen Marguerite, and Pamela Payton-Wright as Juliette.

In 1972, a production was brought to an abandoned castle along the Hudson River, used for the location of an independent film, directed by David Quaid and Ed Berkeley (available for free on Youtube).

There was a revival on Broadway in 2009 that opened in a limited engagement at the Ethel Barrymore Theatre, with previews starting March 7, 2009, opening March 26, and closing June 14. Directed by Armfield, it starred Geoffrey Rush (who won a Tony Award for his performance), Susan Sarandon, William Sadler, Andrea Martin, Lauren Ambrose and Brian Hutchison.

The play was filmed for television in 1978 in a production directed by Yves-André Hubert and again in 2006. A production of Exit the King was mounted by Company B (Sydney) in 2007 directed by Neil Armfield, starring Geoffrey Rush as King Berenger. The production also formed part of the 2007 Malthouse Theatre season in Melbourne and was one of the plays in the VCE curriculum drama students could choose to analyse.

In November 2014, the Ustinov Studio in Bath put on a production directed by Laurence Boswell, featuring Alun Armstrong, Siobhan Redmond and William Gaunt.

In December 2015, the DIT Drama Society in Dublin Institute of Technology put on a production directed by Fintan Lawlor, featuring Conor Bergin and Donall Courtney. This production was later reprised in March 2016 at the Irish Student Drama Awards Festival.

In August 2016, the Shakespeare Theatre of New Jersey put on a production directed by Bonnie J. Monte. The production received rave reviews, with the Wall Street Journal writing "If you've never seen a Ionesco play - or a production by the Shakespeare Theatre of New Jersey, whose consistent excellence has become a byword - then now's the time,"

In July 2018, the National Theatre in London put on a production directed by Patrick Marber starring Rhys Ifans in the role of the King. It was met with mixed reviews.

On 10 August 2023, during a season at the Cameri Theatre in Tel Aviv a few hecklers interrupted the performance several times thinking that the play was criticising the government. The vast majority of the audience responded shouting “shame” and “democracy” which have become chants in the protests against the Israeli government's judicial changes. The actors explained that the play was written in 1962 and theatre has the right to express opinions and political views. The performance resumed and the audience applauded.

== Awards and nominations ==
=== 2009 Broadway revival ===
Year	Award	Category	Nominee	Result
2009	Tony Award	Best Actor in a Play	Geoffrey Rush	Won
2009	Tony Award	Best Scenic Design of a Play	Dale Ferguson	Nominated
2009	Tony Award	Best Costume Design of a Play	Dale Ferguson	Nominated
2009	Tony Award	Best Sound Design of a Play	Russell Goldsmith	Nominated
2009	Drama Desk Award	Outstanding Revival of a Play		Nominated
2009	Drama Desk Award	Outstanding Actor in a Play	Geoffrey Rush	Won
2009	Drama Desk Award	Outstanding Featured Actress in a Play	Andrea Martin	Nominated
2009	Drama Desk Award	Outstanding Scenic Design of a Play	Dale Ferguson	Nominated
2009	Theatre World Award		Geoffrey Rush	Won

== See also ==
- Theatre of the Absurd
- List of Romanian plays
