= Macbett =

1972 satirical play by Eugène Ionesco

- Written by: Eugène Ionesco
- Original language: French
- Genre: satire

Premiere
- Date premiered: 1972
- Place premiered: Théâtre de l'Alliance française

Macbett is Eugène Ionesco's satire on Shakespeare's Macbeth first staged in 1972.

== Plot ==
Two generals, Macbett and Banco, put down a rebellion. In payment for their heroic service, Archduke Duncan promises to bestow on them land, titles and cash, but he reneges on the deal. Encouraged by the seductive Lady Duncan, Macbett plots to assassinate the Archduke and crown himself King. He tries to maintain his tenuous grip on the throne through a vicious cycle of murder and bloodshed. Meanwhile, he is haunted by the ghosts of his victims and discovers that his new wife is not all that she seems.

== Themes ==
Written during the Cold War, Ionesco's Macbett remoulds Shakespeare's Macbeth into a comic tale of ambition, corruption, cowardice and excess, creating a tragic farce which takes human folly to its wildest extremes. Innovations include a long conversation between the thanes of Glamiss and Candor, the characters of a lemonade seller and butterfly hunter, and the revelation that the rightful heir to the throne is a worse tyrant than Macbett ever was.

== See also ==
- List of Romanian plays

== Sources ==
- Billington, Michael (18 June 2007). "Macbett". The Guardian.
- Curtiss, Thomas Quinn (9 February 1972). "Ionesco Upends Macbeth Story". The New York Times. p. 45.
- Smith, Emma (2003). Macbeth: Language and Writing. Arden Student Guides. A&C Black. ISBN 9781408156032.
