= The Star Without a Name =

- Original language: Romanian
- Written by: Mihail Sebastian
- Characters: The mysterious girls; Astronomy Teacher Miroiu; Music Teacher Udrea; Mrs. Cucu; The boss of the train station; Grig; student Zamfirescu; Peasant Pascu; Ichim; The conductor; The students

Premiere
- Date: 1944
- Place: Alhambra

The Star Without a Name, or, The Star With No Name (Romanian: Steaua fără nume) is a play by the Romanian author Mihail Sebastian, completed in 1942. Two movies were based on this play: Mona, l'étoile sans nom (1965, in French), starring Marina Vlady, and Nameless Star (Russian: Безымянная звезда, romanized: Bezymyannaya zvezda, 1978, in Russian) directed by and starring Mikhail Kozakov.

The premiere of the play took place on March 1, 1944 at the "Alhambra" Magazine Theatre.

== Cast ==
- Nora Piacentini as Miss Cucu
- Mircea Șeptilici as Grig
- Radu Beligan as Professor Miroiu
- V. Brezianu as Udrea
- Nicolae Tomazoglu as Pascu

== See also ==
- List of Romanian plays
