= The Evangelists =

The Evangelists (Evangheliştii in Romanian) is a controversial play by Romanian academic and writer Alina Mungiu-Pippidi. The play received the UNITER Prize, one of Romania's most prestigious literary awards, in 1992.

== Plot summary ==
The play is set in Antioch, about two millennia ago, where Simon Peter calls on four students of the Cherintos Academy - John, Mark, Matthew and Luke, the writers of the New Testament - to write four "books" about the life of Jesus. The play tells the story of Jesus in a manner very different from that of the New Testament, with many subversions of plot. For example, in the play, Peter is portrayed as a negative character, violent, misogynistic and accused of killing Jesus. Additionally, Mary Magdalene is shown as performing oral sex on Jesus while washing his feet, while the Last Supper is shown as a violent gathering in which Peter kills all of the other apostles.

== Criticism ==
The play debuted in late 2005 for the first time in Romania, where it sparked a significant amount of controversy. It was criticised by Romanian religious organisations, particularly the Romanian Orthodox Church and the Roman Catholic Church of Romania for its "blasphemous" subject matter, which "makes a ridicule of Jesus Christ". This was due to the offensive portrayal of figures highly revered in Christianity, particularly Jesus, Peter and Mary Magdelene. The play was also denounced as an "attack against public morals" by Teoctist Arăpaşu, the Patriarch of the Romanian Orthodox Church.

A press release by the Roman Catholic Church of Iaşi stated:

"We consider this play to be an attack against public morals, a serious indecency disguised as "art", an attack against faith in God, an insult against the holiest figures: Jesus, Mary and the Apostles"

Mungiu has defended herself against these claims by asserting her right to freedom of speech.

== See also ==
- List of Romanian plays
