= Paul Ioachim =

Romanian playwright, actor, and theater director (1930–2002)

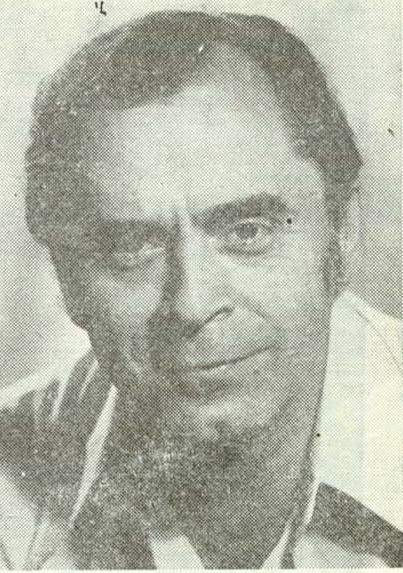

Paul Ioachim (1930 in Buzău, Romania – 2002) was a Romanian playwright, actor, and theater director. He was also the director of George Ciprian Theatre in Buzău. Some of his works include:

- Ascensiunea unei fecioare
- Nu suntem îngeri
- Goana
- Nemaipomenitele aventuri a doi îndrăgostiți
- Așteptam pe altcineva
- Ce e nou pe Strada Salcâmilor
- Idealul
- Omul de noroi sau O viață și încă o noapte
- Podul sinucigașilor
- Totul e un joc
- Comedii... și ceva drame

== See also ==
- List of Romanian playwrights
