= The Killer (play) =

Play by Eugène Ionesco

First English edition (publ. Grove Press)

The Killer (French: Tueur sans gages, sometimes translated The Killer without Reason or The Killer without Cause) is a play written by Eugène Ionesco in 1958. It is the first of Ionesco's Berenger plays, the others being Rhinocéros (1959), Exit the King (1962), and A Stroll in the Air (1963).

== Plot ==
In The Killer, Berenger (Ionesco’s downtrodden everyman) discovers an ideal "radiant city". The elation Berenger feels in the city of light is cut short by the discovery that the city is host to a killer who drowns his victims in a pool after luring them there by offering to show them a "picture of the colonel". Berenger leaves the radiant city after Dany, a woman he falls in love with instantly and believes that he is engaged to, is murdered, and he spends much of the play tracking down the killer. At the end of the play, he encounters the killer, a small man and by all appearances Berenger’s physical inferior. In a long climactic speech, similar to the speech at the end of Rhinoceros, Berenger tries to convince the killer that murdering is wrong, using multiple arguments and justifications—ranging from sympathy to patriotism to Christianity to nihilism. Eventually he comes to the conclusion that there is no hope and that it is useless to try and dissuade the killer. It is unclear whether Berenger actually dies at the end of the play. He appears in several other plays, and whether these occur before or after The Killer is uncertain. Factual contradiction is one of Ionesco's most common themes, and several other details about Berenger contradict other plays (most glaringly perhaps being Exit the King, in which Berenger is a dying king).

== Analysis ==
The idea of a "radiant city" or a transcendent other world is a common theme in many of Ionesco’s plays. Ionesco had a transcendent experience in his childhood, similar to the story told by Berenger in the beginning of the play, in which Ionesco felt like he was lifted off the ground and everything around him became radiant. Berenger's learning of the killer reflects Ionesco’s feeling of disappointment at the end of his transcendent experience.

In an interview with Claude Bonnefoy, Ionesco said of the killer in the "radiant city": "It's the fall, it's original sin, in other words, a slackening of attention, of the strength with which one looks at things; or again in other words, it's losing the faculty of wonderment; oblivion; the paralysis bred by habit." Ionesco goes on to complain about the way critics missed this aspect of the play: "Nobody came close to understanding the play in this way. The critics said that it was not in fact about a radiant city, or rather, that this radiant city was the modern city, industrial and technological ... For me, the 'radiant' city means a city 'shining with light'. Some people also said that this radiant city was not a happy city since a criminal could enter it and flourish in it. That's quite wrong. It was a very happy city that had been entered by a destructive spirit. (The word 'destructive' is more appropriate than 'good' or 'evil' – they're very vague notions.) ”.

== Adaptations ==
On September 14, 1964 there was a radio adaptation of “The Killer” broadcast on the BBC Third Programme. It was produced by H.B. Fortuin. The cast featured Eric Barker, Nigel Stock and Avis Bunnage.

A version of Tueur sans gages titled Killer, adapted by Dan Rebellato and directed by Polly Thomas, was broadcast on BBC Radio 3 on 18 April 2021, with Toby Jones as "Sam Barringer", Christine Bottomley as "Dani" and Toby Hadoke as "The Killer".

== See also ==
- Theatre of the Absurd
- List of Romanian plays
