= Ciuta sheep =

Italian breed of sheep

Ciuta
- Conservation status: FAO (2007): extinct; DAD-IS (2025): at risk/endangered
- Country of origin: Italy
- Distribution: province of Sondrio
- Standard: Assonapa (in Italian)
- Use: meat

Traits
- Weight: Male: 35–40 kg; Female: 30–35 kg
- Height: Male: 45-50 cm; Female: 40–45 cm
- Wool colour: straw-white
- Face colour: white
- Horn status: horned in both sexes

The Ciuta is an Italian breed of small mountain sheep from the province of Sondrio, in Lombardy in northern Italy. About a hundred of the sheep were counted in a census in 1983, and it was later believed to be extinct. A small number were identified in 2001, and the breed was officially recognised in 2018. In 2025 its conservation status was listed as "at risk/endangered", based on a total population of just over 500 head.

== History ==
The Ciuta originates in the mountainous terrain of the Val Masino and the Valchiavenna, in an area where Lombard is spoken; ciuta means "little sheep" in the local language. It may have common origins with the Ciavenasca breed from the same area.

About a hundred of the sheep were counted in a census in 1983, and there were no further data in the twentieth century; the breed was thought to be extinct, and was listed as such by the Food and Agriculture Organization of the United Nations in 2007. The breed was not recognised by the Ministero delle Politiche Agricole Alimentari e Forestali, the Italian ministry of agriculture and forestry, and was not among the forty-two autochthonous local sheep breeds of limited distribution for which a herdbook is kept by the Associazione Nazionale della Pastorizia, the Italian national association of sheep-breeders.

A small number were identified in 2001, and in 2018 the Ciuta was officially recognised by the Ministero dell'Agricoltura, della Sovranità Alimentare e delle Foreste. The Regione Lombardia offers a subsidy for those who keep nine or more of the sheep for at least five years. In 2025 the conservation status of the breed was listed in DAD-IS as "at risk/endangered", based on a reported total population of 516 head, including 331 breeding ewes and 48 rams in service.

== Characteristics ==
It is a small sheep, the smallest of the Alpine region: ewes stand some 40–45 cm at the shoulder and weigh from 30 to 35 kg; rams are on average about 5 cm taller and 5 kg heavier. Horns are present in both sexes; the fleece and face are straw-white. The sheep are well adapted to the mountain terrain of their area of distribution.

== Use ==
The Ciuta is raised only for meat; lambs are slaughtered at a weight of 12–15 kg. The wool is of very poor quality and the yield is low – fleeces weigh about 1 kg. The milk is sufficient only for the lambs.
