= Ciavenasca =

Italian breed of sheep

- Conservation status: FAO (2007): not at risk
- Other names: Civenasca
- Country of origin: Italy
- Distribution: Province of Sondrio
- Standard: MIPAAF
- Use: meat

Traits
- Weight: Male: 50 kg; Female: 42 kg
- Height: Male: 60 cm; Female: 52 cm
- Wool color: white
- Face color: white
- Horn status: hornless in both sexes

The Ciavenasca is an Italian breed of small domestic sheep from the province of Sondrio, in Lombardy in northern Italy. It is raised in the mountainous terrain of the Val San Giacomo, the Val Bregaglia and the Valchiavenna, from which the name of the breed derives. It is raised only for meat; the wool is of very poor quality, and the milk is sufficient only for the lambs. It is one of the forty-two autochthonous local sheep breeds of limited distribution for which a herdbook is kept by the Associazione Nazionale della Pastorizia, the Italian national association of sheep-breeders.

In 2013 total numbers for the breed were not reported. A population of 3300 was reported in 2003.
