= Mircea Ștefănescu =

Romanian water polo player

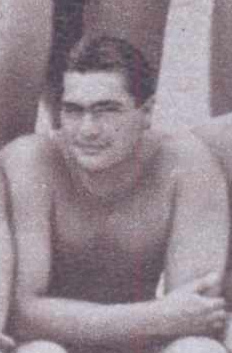

Personal information
- Nationality: Romanian
- Born: 2 December 1936 (age 88); Beliu, Romania

Sport
- Sport: Water polo

Mircea Ștefănescu (born 2 December 1936) is a Romanian water polo player. He competed at the 1960 Summer Olympics and the 1964 Summer Olympics.

== See also ==
- Romania men's Olympic water polo team records and statistics
- List of men's Olympic water polo tournament goalkeepers
