= Romanian Academic Society =

Academic Society

The Romanian Academic Society (Societatea Academică din România in Romanian) is a Bucharest-based think tank and NGO founded in 1996.

SAR seeks to

- Contribute to good governance and development through policy research.
- Contribute to the European integration of Romania, Western Balkan countries and Moldova through transfer of best practices and advocacy*enhance the contribution of independent policy institutes to the process of policy formulation through advocacy and public debate.
- Contribute to the (re)building of the fields of applied social sciences and public policy in Romania and South-Eastern Europe after fifty years of communism.

The current president of the Society is Alina Mungiu-Pippidi. The other Board members are Aurora Liiceanu, Ana Maria Sandi, Andrei Pleșu, Ioan Popa, Sorin Vieru, and Daniel Dăianu.

The Romanian Academic Society should not be confused with the Romanian Academy, a government-funded body that regulates the Romanian language and promotes Romanian culture and literature. The usage of the words "Academic" and "Romanian" is restricted by Romanian law.
