= Ciuta (play) =

- Written by: Victor Ion Popa
- Original language: Romanian
- Genre: Three-act play

Premiere
- Date premiered: 1922
- Place premiered: National Theatre Bucharest

Ciuta is a three-act play by Victor Ion Popa first performed in 1922 at National Theatre Bucharest.

== Bibliography ==
- Paul Prodan, Teatrul românesc contemporan, [1920-1927], Fundația Culturală Principele Carol pag. 221–224
- Ștefan Cristea, Victor Ion Popa, viața și descrierea operei: contribuții documentare, Ed. Minerva, 1973
- Vicu Mîndra, Victor Ion Popa, Ed. Albatros, 1975
- Vicu Mîndra, Istoria literaturii dramatice românești: De la începuturi pînă la 1890, Ed. Minerva, 1985

== See also ==
- List of Romanian plays
