= Irinel =

Irinel is a Romanian unisex given name. Notable people with the name include:

- Irinel Pănulescu (born 1964), Romanian swimmer
- Irinel Popescu (born 1953), Romanian surgeon
- Irinel Voicu (born 1977), Romanian footballer
