= Puși Dinulescu =

Romanian playwright, film, director, novelist and poet

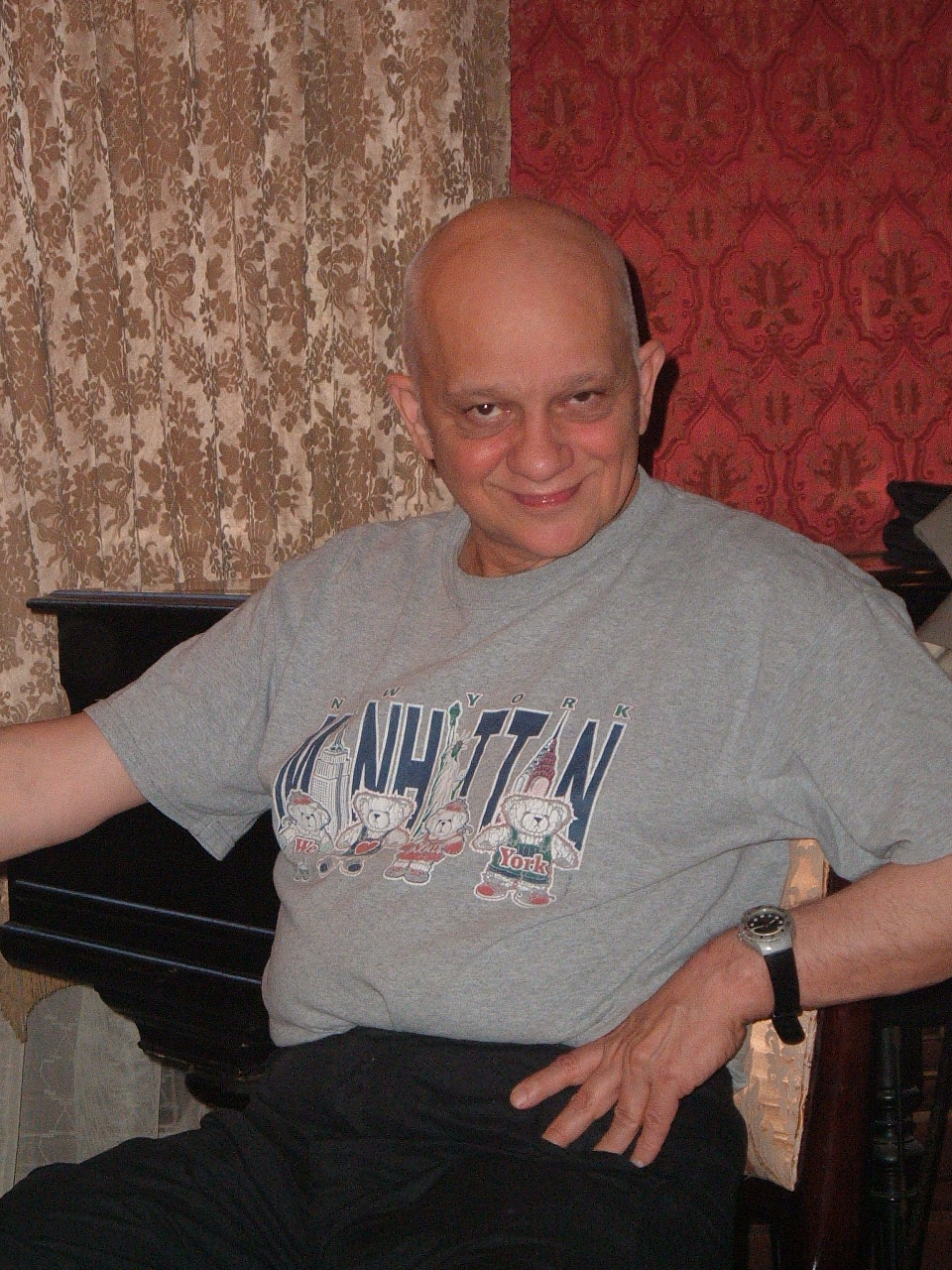
- Puși Dinulescu in 2006
- Born: Dumitru D. Dinulescu; 27 August 1942; Bucharest, Kingdom of Romania
- Died: 1 August 2019 (aged 76); Bucharest, Romania
- Resting place: Bellu Cemetery, Bucharest
- Education: University of Bucharest; Caragiale National University of Theatre and Film
- Occupations: Playwright, film, theatre/television director, novelist, poet
- Awards: The Bucharest Writers' Association Award (1979); The Writers' Union of Romania Award (1985)

Puși Dinulescu (Romanian pronunciation: [ˈpuʃi dinuˈlesku]; born Dumitru Dinulescu [duˈmitru] (27 August 1942 – 1 August 2019) was a Romanian playwright, film, theatre and television director, novelist, and poet.

== Biography ==
He was the son of the engineer Dumitru I. Dinulescu and Ileana Dinulescu (born Butunoiu), a housewife. He graduated in Letters at the University of Bucharest and Film and Television Direction at Institute of Theatre and Film Arts (IATC), Bucharest. Dinulescu made his debut in 1968, with Robert Calul (Robert the Horse), a collection of short stories. He also wrote novels, poetry and comedies.

He received The Bucharest Writers' Association Award (1979) for Linda Belinda (a collection of short stories) and The Writers' Union of Romania Award (1985), for his novel Îngerul contabil. He received in 2018 the Union Award for "long-standing eminent activity in dramaturgy" from the Union of the Romanian Writers, the Bucharest branch.

Dinulescu died in 2019 at Floreasca Hospital, of a heart attack. He is buried at Bellu Cemetery, in Bucharest.

== Works ==
- Short stories
  - 1968: Robert Calul, Editura pentru literatură
  - 1979: Linda Belinda, Cartea Românească. The Bucharest Writers' Association Award
  - 1982: Eu și Robert Calul (Robert Calul and Me), Eminescu
  - 1982: Razrîv (Separation), I. Bogdan's Russian Translation of the short stories "At home", "The Atanasiu Family" and "Separation".
  - 2003: Crimă la circ (Murder in Circus), Meronia
  - 2014: Lungul drum al prozei scurte (The long way of the short story), Tipo-Moldova, Iași
- Novels
  - 1980: Galaxia Burlacilor (Bachelors Galaxy), Cartea Românească
  - 1985: Îngerul contabil (Accounting Angel), Cartea Românească. The Writers' Union of Romania Award. Second ed. 1998, Regis
  - 2001: Romanul Sfintei Mogoșoaia (The Life and Times of Saint Mogoșoaia), Meronia
  - 2009: Le vieux garçon, (French version of the novel Bachelors Galaxy signed Pouschy Dinulesco; translated by Michel Wattremez), Meronia
  - 2010: Burlacul (The Bachelor), Minerva
- Poetry
  - 2002: Poezii bestiale (Awesome Poems)
  - 2006: Frumoasa și lapovița (The Belle and the Sleet)
  - 2015: Tandrețe tărăgănată (Jingling Tenderness), RBA Media
- Plays

-first performed in TVR, National Theatre of Craiova, Robert Calul Theatre of Bucharest and in Pitești, Giurgiu, Bârlad and Turda. Bani de dus, bani de-ntors (The old man who dearly paid his return fare) Miere și venin (Honey and venom) Casa cu țoape (House of the Uncouth) Nunta lui Puiu (Puiu's Wedding) Pescărușul lui Hamlet (The Hamlet's Seagull) Senvici cu infinit (Boundless Sandwich)

-editions

- 2002: Două piese de teatru (Two plays), Meronia
- 2004: Pescărușul lui Hamlet (The Hamlet's Seagull), Palimpsest
- 2005: Nunta lui Puiu (Puiu's Wedding), Palimpsest
- 2010: Teatru (Theatre), Minerva
- 2013: La Boda de Puiu (Puiu's Wedding) – translated in Spanish by Juan Martinez, RBA Media
- Polemical Works
  - 2009: Gașca și diavolul (The Gang and The Devil), Minerva

== Travels ==
- 2013: Călătoriile lui Nea Puși (Uncle Puși's Travels), Lider

== Translations from Spanish ==
- 2014: Frederico Garcia Lorca Romancero gitano Editura Tribuna, Cluj-Napoca

== Filmography ==
- Director
  - 1983: Întâlnirea din Pământuri (The Encounter of Pământuri)
  - 1985: Sper să ne mai vedem (I hope to see you again)
  - 1998: Nuntă cu sirenă (Wedding with a siren) – TV Film
- Screenwriter
  - 1998: Nuntă cu sirenă – TV Film
