= Paul Everac =

Romanian drama writer

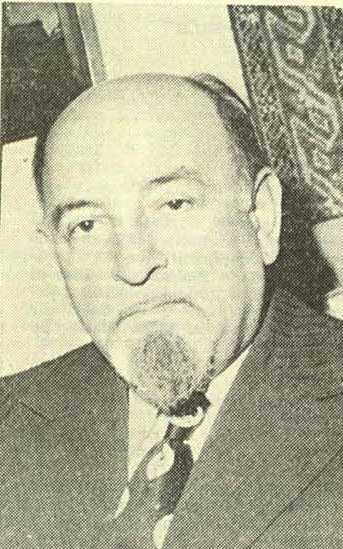
Paul Everac in 1980

Paul Everac (born Petre Constantinescu; August 23, 1924 – October 18, 2011) was a Romanian drama writer who wrote more than 140 plays.

Born in Bucharest, he wrote his first literary work, the dramatic poem Robinson, in 1948. Ten other plays followed in the space of a few years, generally reinterpretations and paraphrases of well-known myths such as Oedipus, Iphigenia, John the Baptist, Noah, or events such as the French Revolution. His stage plays for the theater had national and foreign representations. In 1960 he was accepted into the Writers' Union of Romania. In 1971, he was awarded the Order of Cultural Merit, first class.

During the early days of the communist regime, Everac was head of protocol in the presidium of the Great National Assembly; his direct bosses at the time were Petru Groza and Avram Bunaciu. After the Romanian Revolution of 1989, he was Chairman of the Romanian Television (TVR) between 1993 and 1994. He was removed from his post after months of pressure from opposition groups who criticized his ultra-nationalist views. He received the most criticism after he organized the New Year's Eve show at the end of 1993, a show which has been branded as "the most catastrophic in the history of TVR". From 1995 to 1997, he was Chairman of the Nicolae Iorga Romanian Cultural Institute of Humanistic Research in Venice.

He died from cancer at the Floreasca Hospital in Bucharest on October 18, 2011, at the age of 87. He was buried in the city's Bellu Cemetery, by Writer's Alley.
