= Floreasca Hospital =

Floreasca Hospital Spitalul Clinic de Urgență București Floreasca

Geography
- Location: Calea Floreasca 8, Sector 1, Bucharest, Romania
- Coordinates: 44°27′14″N 26°6′5″E

Organisation
- Type: Clinical
- Patron: Radu Alexandru Macovei

Services
- Emergency department: Yes
- Beds: 731

Helipads
- Helipad: Proposed

History
- Founded: 5 May 1934; 92 years ago

Links
- Website: www.urgentafloreasca.ro

Floreasca Hospital (Romanian: Spitalul Clinic de Urgență București Floreasca) is a major hospital located at 8 Calea Floreasca, Bucharest, Romania. The hospital is specialized in providing emergency medical care.

== History ==
The Floreasca Hospital is the first institution in Romania specialized in providing emergency medical care. It opened in 1933, specifically for this purpose. Initially, the hospital was funded by Nicolae Minovici, a Romanian professor.

On August 24, 1944, the hospital building was destroyed during the Bombing of Bucharest. In 1949, a new building was built for the hospital. The building, renovated several times, is still operational today. In 1960, the building was substantially modified, and 7 new floors were added.

== Floreasca today ==
The hospital has 760 beds for patients. It has multiple operating theaters and has sections for all the major branches of medicine, including plastic surgery, neurosurgery, and psychiatry.

The hospital has been a pioneer for many pilot projects in the field of medicine. It has been one of the first hospitals in Romania to perform robotic surgery on a patient.

Floreasca is also a teaching hospital.
