= Dumitru Radu Popescu =

Romanian writer (1935–2023)

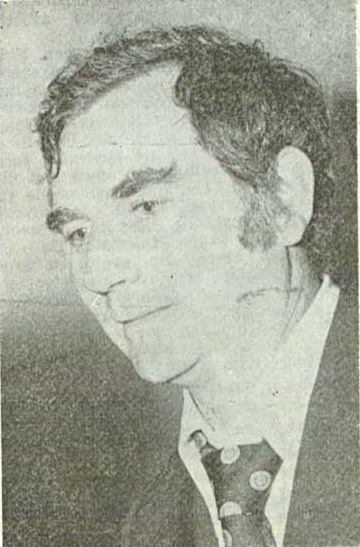
D.R. Popescu (c.1985)

Dumitru Radu Popescu (Romanian pronunciation: [duˈmitru ˈradu poˈpesku]; 19 August 1935 – 2 January 2023) was a Romanian novelist, poet, dramatist, essayist and short story writer. He was a corresponding member of the Romanian Academy and was, between 1980 and 1990, Chairman of the Romanian Writers' Union.

His 1973 novel Vînatoarea Regală ("The Royal Hunt") was translated into English in 1988. His works have been described as "magical realism" and compared with those of Italo Calvino.

== Biography ==
Born in Păușa village, Nojorid (Bihor County), he attended the University of Medicine and Pharmacy in Cluj, but left before completing his studies. Later, he studied at Babeș-Bolyai University (Faculty of Philology). He then worked as a reporter for the literary magazine Steaua, from 1956 to 1969, and served as editor of Tribuna magazine, from 1969 to 1982. From 1982 he was editor-in-chief of Contemporanul. Since 2006, he has been the General Manager of the Romanian Academy's publishing house.

Popescu received the Prize of the Romanian Writers' Union on five occasions (in 1964, 1969, 1974, 1977, and 1980), and the Prize of the Romanian Academy in 1970.

In addition to his literary activities, beginning in 1968, he was a substitute member of the Central Committee of the Romanian Communist Party and was elected to the Great National Assembly in 1975. From 1979 to 1989, he was a full member of the committee.

In 1983, one of his books was in the middle of a fight between a Romanian review, România Literară, and a Russian one, Literaturnaya Gazeta. For the Russians, his book about life after the war was too dark.

== Death ==
Popescu died in Bucharest on 2 January 2023, at the age of 87 and was buried in the city's Bellu Cemetery, by the Writers' Alley.

== Works ==
Novels

- Zilele Saptămânii ("Weekdays", 1959)
- Vara Oltenilor ("The Oltenians' Summer", 1964)
- F (1969)
- Vînatoarea Regală ("The Royal Hunt", 1973) ISBN 0-7043-0044-3
- O bere pentru calul meu ("A Beer for my Horse", 1974)
- Ploile de Dincolo de Vreme ("Rains Beyond Time", 1976)
- Împaratul Norilor ("Emperor of the Clouds", 1976)
- Iepurele șchiop ("The Lame Rabbit", 1980)
- Oraşul îngerilor ("The Angels' City", 1985)

Short story collections

- Fuga ("Flight", 1958)
- Fata de la Miazăzi ("A Girl from the South", 1964)
- Somnul Pamîntului ("The Earth's Sleep", 1965)
- Dor ("Longing", 1966)
- Umbrela de Soare ("Parasol", 1967)
- Prea mic pentru un război așa de mare ("Too Little for Such a Big War", 1969)
- Duios Anastasia trecea ("Tenderly Anastasia Passed", 1967)
- Leul Albastru ("The Blue Lion", 1981)

Plays

- Vara imposibilei iubiri ("The Summer of Impossible Love", 1966)
- Vis ("Dream", 1968)
- Acești îngeri triști ("Those Sad Angels", 1969)
- Pisica în noaptea Anului Nou ("Cat on New Year's Eve", 1970)
- Pasărea Shakespeare ("The Shakespeare Bird", 1973)
- Rugaciune pentru un disc-jockey ("Pray for a DJ", 1981)
- Rezervația de pelicani ("The Pelican Reservation", 1983)

Poems

- Câinele de Fosfor ("The Phosphorus Dog", 1981)

Essays

- Virgule ("Commas", 1978)
