= Ion Băieșu =

Romanian playwright, movie and television writer (1933–1992)

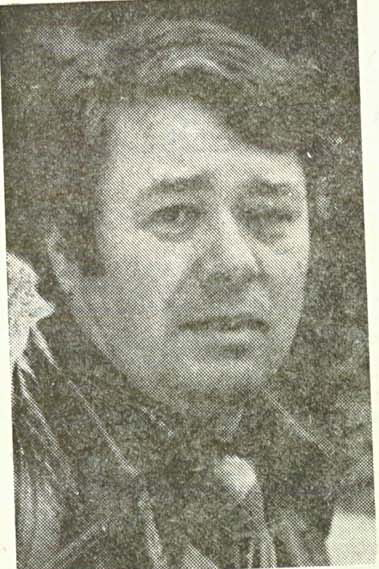
- Born: January 2, 1933; Aldeni, Buzău County
- Died: September 21, 1992 (aged 59); Bucharest
- Other name: Ion Mihalache
- Occupations: playwright, novelist, movie and television writer
- Notable work: Balanța

Ion Băieșu, pen name of Ion Mihalache (2 January 1933, in Aldeni, Buzău County – 21 September 1992, in Bucharest) was a Romanian playwright, novelist and movie and television writer, best known for his novel Balanța and his play Preșul.

== Biography ==
Son of a poor shepherd from a village near Buzău, young Ion graduated from the Commercial High-School in Buzău in 1951. Upon graduation, he worked for a rural commercial state enterprise. In 1957 he left for Bucharest to attend the "Mihai Eminescu" Literary School, and subsequently, he worked for several newspapers in Bucharest and Petroșani.

His literary debut took place in 1956 with a series of short stories under the title "Necazuri și bucurii" (Troubles and Joy). He wrote under the pen name of Ion Băieșu, because Ion Mihalache had also been a prominent conservative Romanian politician, undesirable to the communists. In 1961, he graduated from the University of Bucharest.

His works include many satirical and humoristic short stories, including his most successful plays "Tanța și Costel" and "Preșul" ("The Doormat"). In 1985, he also became successful with his novel "Balanța", the story of a psychologist, Nela, and a doctor, Mitică Bostan. He also wrote the script for the 1992 movie directed by Lucian Pintilie based on the same novel.

== Works ==
=== Plays ===
- Preșul (The Doormat)
- Tanţa și Costel (Tanța and Costel)
- Desu și Kant (Desu and Kant)
- Tristețea vânzătorului de sticle goale (The Sadness of an Empty Bottle Salesman)
- Iertarea (Forgiveness)
- Reclamație (Complaint)

=== Novels ===
- Balanța (The Scales)
- Acceleratorul (The Accelerator)
- Un activist al suferinței

=== Movie scripts ===
- Balanța (1992) (after his novel), movie directed by Lucian Pintilie
- Vinovatul (The Culprit - 1991)
- Harababura (1990)
- De ce are vulpea coadă? (Why The Fox Has A Tail - 1988)
- Miracolul (The Miracle - 1988)
- Omul din Buzău (The Man from Buzău - 1988 - TV)
- Duminica în familie (Sunday in the Family - 1987)
- Sper să ne mai vedem (I Hope to See You Again - 1985)
- Aventura sub pământ (The Underground Adventure - 1982 - teleplay TV)
- Grăbește-te încet (Hasten Slowly - 1981)
- Omul care ne trebuie (The Man We Need - 1979)
- Rătăcire (1978)
- Avocatul (The Attorney - 1976 - TV)
- Un text cu bucluc (1976 - TV film)
- Astă-seară dansăm în familie (Tonight We Dance In The Family - 1972)
- Maiorul și moartea (The Major and Death - 1967)
- Camera albă (The White Chamber - 1964)
- Iubirea e un lucru foarte mare (Love Is A Very Big Thing - 1962)
