= Matei Vișniec =

Romanian writer

- Matei Vișniec
- Matei Vișniec (2026)
- Born: 29 January 1956 (age 70); Rădăuți, Suceava Region, Romanian People's Republic
- Citizenship: Romanian; French
- Education: University of Bucharest
- Occupations: playwright, poet, novelist
- Spouse: Andra
- Children: 1 daughter
- Writing career
- Language: Romanian, French
- Years active: 1977–present
- Period: 1975–1980
- Genre: Postmodernism
- Notable works: The Body of a Woman as a Battlefield in the Bosnian War; The Story of the Panda Bears told by a Saxophonist who has a Girlfriend in Frankfurt
- Notable awards: 2007, 2002 and 1999 – Drama Award of the Romanian Writers' Union; 1998 – Drama Award of the Romanian Academy; 2009, 2008, 1996 and 1995 – Press Avignon-Off Award; 1991 – Award of the Romanian Theatrical Society for "Clown Wanted", the best play of the year European Award of The French Society of Dramatic Authors and Composers (SACD)
- Website: www.visniec.com

Matei Vișniec (Romanian: [maˈtej viʃˈnjek]; born 29 January 1956) is a Romanian-French playwright, poet and journalist living in Paris.

== Biography ==
Vișniec graduated in 1980 from the History and Philosophy Faculty of the University of Bucharest. Between 1977 and 1987 he wrote 8 plays in two or three acts, about twenty short plays, and some screenplays, but all were turned down by the censors. In 1987 he was invited to France by a literary foundation, and he asked for political asylum. Between August 1988 and October 1989 he lived in London, where he worked for the Romanian section of the BBC.

After settling down in France, he has been writing mostly in French, and has received French citizenship. After the fall of communism in Romania, in 1989, Matei Vișniec became one of the most performed playwrights in the country, with more than 30 plays put on in Bucharest and other towns. In 1996 the National Theatre of Timișoara organized a Matei Vișniec Festival with 12 companies presenting his plays. His international audience as a playwright started in 1992, with the play Horses at the Windows performed in France, and Old Clown Wanted at the "Bonner Biennale".

Since then, Vișniec has had more than 20 plays performed in France (Théâtre Guichet Montparnasse, Studio des Champs-Elysées, Théâtre du Rond-Point des Champs Elysées – Paris, Théâtre de l'Utopie – La Rochelle, Compagnie Pli Urgent – Lyon, Théâtre Le Jodel – Avignon, Théâtre de Lenche and Théâtre de la Minoterie – Marseille, Compagnie Nice-Théâtre Vivant – Nice, etc.). Old Clown Wanted has been performed in: France, Germany, United States, Denmark, Austria, Poland, Finland, Italy, Turkey, Brazil, Romania, Azerbaijan, Moldavia, and Georgia.

He is working as a journalist at Radio France Internationale.

== Writings ==
=== Poetry ===
- La noapte va ninge ("Tonight It Will Snow"), Bucharest, Alb., 1980
- Orașul cu un singur locuitor ("The Town With a Single Inhabitant"), Bucharest, Alb., 1982
- Înțeleptul la ora de ceai ("The Sage at the Tea Hour"), Bucharest, Cartea Românească, 1984. ISBN 9789738475540
- Poeme ulterioare ("Subsequent Poems") (1987–1999), Bucharest, Cartea Românească, 2000

=== Prose ===
- Cafeneaua Pas-Parol, novel, Bucharest, FCR, 1992
- Sindromul de panică în Orașul Luminilor, novel, Bucharest, Cartea Românească, 2009
- Un secol de ceață, novel, Bucharest, Polirom, 2021

=== Plays in Romanian ===
- Ţara lui Gufi ("Gufi's Land", three-act play), Bucharest., IC, 1991
- Angajare de clovn ("Hiring a Clown", published in the same volume as Evangheliștii by Alina Mungiu), foreword by Marian Popescu, Bucharest., Ed. Unitext, 1993
- Teatru, vol. I-II, foreword by Valentin Silvestru, Bucharest, Cartea Românească, 1996 1991–1995)

=== Plays in French ===
- Personne n’a le droit de traîner sans armes sur un champ de bataille, 1991
- Le marchand de temps, 1992
- Les partitions frauduleuses, 1993
- Hécatombéon, 1993
- Théâtre décomposé ou L’homme-poubelle, 1993
- La grammaire du silence, 1994
- Trois nuits avec Madox, 1994
- L’histoire des ours pandas racontée par un saxophoniste qui a une petite amie à Francfort, 1994
- Cils interdits pendant la nuit, 1995
- Paparazzi ou la chronique d’un lever de soleil avorté, 1995
- Comment pourais-je être un oiseau?, 1996
- Du sexe de la femme comme champ de bataille dans la guerre en Bosnie, 2019
- Jeanne et le feu, 2009/2019

=== Plays in English ===
- "The Body of a Woman as a Battlefield in the Bosnian War", trans. Alison Sinclair in Balkan Plots: Plays from Central and Eastern Europe. 2000.

== Style ==
Literary critic Alex Ștefănescu considers his plays to be "bizarre, unclassifiable".
