= Tudor Mușatescu =

Romanian writer (1903–1970)

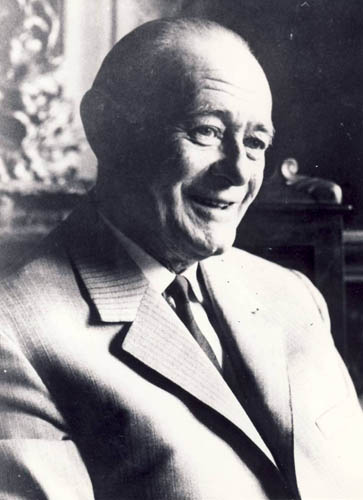
- Born: 22 February 1903; Câmpulung, Argeș County, Kingdom of Romania
- Died: 4 November 1970 (aged 67); Bucharest, Socialist Republic of Romania
- Resting place: Bellu Cemetery, Bucharest
- Education: University of Bucharest
- Spouse: Kitty Stroescu
- Children: Bogdan Mușatescu
- Writing career
- Notable work: Titanic Vals

Tudor Mușatescu (Romanian pronunciation: [ˈtudor muʃaˈtesku]; February 22, 1903 – November 4, 1970) was a Romanian playwright and short story writer, best known for his humorous prose.

== Biography ==
Mușatescu was born in Câmpulung-Muscel to a family of middle-class intellectuals — his father was a lawyer while his mother was a writer. He studied at the Dinicu Golescu High School in his hometown, and began writing during his early years in school. He completed studies at the University of Bucharest, where he earned a degree in Law and one in Literature. Afterwards, he wrote for several newspapers, including Rampa and Adevărul.

Much of his work centers on provincial life in his native city, and includes political satires such as Titanic Vals (arguably, his most influential writing). The 1964 movie Titanic Waltz, directed by Paul Călinescu and starring Grigore Vasiliu-Birlic, was adapted from his play.

He died in Bucharest and was buried in the city's Bellu Cemetery, next to his wife, actress Kitty Stroescu (1907–1990) and their son, Bogdan Mușatescu (1941–2016), also an actor.
