= Mihail Sebastian =

Romanian writer (1907 - 1945)

- Born: Iosif Mendel Hechter; October 18, 1907; Brăila, Romania
- Died: May 29, 1945 (aged 37); Bucharest, Romania
- Resting place: Filantropia Israelite Cemetery in Bucharest
- Occupations: Playwright; essayist; journalist; novelist; lawyer
- Writing career
- Pen name: Mihail Sebastian, Victor Mincu, Amyntas
- Genres: Drama, autobiography, novel
- Subjects: Fiction, cultural history, political history
- Movements: Modernism; Criterion

Mihail Sebastian (Romanian: [mihaˈil sebastiˈan]; born Iosif Mendel Hechter; October 18, 1907 – May 29, 1945) was a Romanian playwright, essayist, journalist and novelist.

== Life ==
Sebastian was born to a Jewish family in Brăila, the son of Mendel and Clara Hechter (née Weintraub). After completing his secondary education, Sebastian studied law in Bucharest, but was soon attracted to the literary life and the exciting ideas of the new generation of Romanian intellectuals, as epitomized by the literary group Criterion which included Emil Cioran, Mircea Eliade and Eugène Ionesco. Author of the best known Romanian play Star Without Name. Sebastian published several novels, including Accidentul ("The Accident") and Orașul cu salcâmi ("The Town with Acacia Trees"), heavily influenced by French novelists such as Marcel Proust and Jules Renard. He legally changed his name from Iosif Mendel Hechter to "Iosif Mihail-Sebastian" in April 1935.

Although initially an apolitical movement, Criterion came under the increasing influence of Nae Ionescu's brand of philosophy, called Trăirism, which mixed jingoistic nationalism, existentialism and Christian mysticism, as well as that of the fascist and antisemitic paramilitary organization known as the Iron Guard.

As a Jew, Sebastian came to be regarded as an outsider within the group, even by his friends. In 1934 he published another novel, De două mii de ani (For Two Thousand Years), about what it meant to be a Jew in Romania, and asked Nae Ionescu, who at the time was still friendly with Sebastian, to write the preface. Ionescu agreed, generating uproar by inserting paragraphs both antisemitic and against the very nature of the book they introduced.

Sebastian "decided to take the only intelligent revenge" and publish the preface, which only heightened the controversy. Sebastian's decision to include the preface prompted criticism from the Jewish community (Jewish satirist Ludovic Halevy, for instance, referred to Sebastian as "Ionescu's lap dog"), as well as the far-right circles patronized by Ionescu and the Iron Guard. The antisemitic daily newspaper Sfarmă Piatră (literally "Breaking Rocks") denounced Sebastian as a "Zionist agent and traitor", despite Sebastian's vocal declaration he was a proud Romanian with no interest in emigrating from his homeland.

In response to the criticism, Sebastian wrote Cum am devenit huligan (How I Became a Hooligan), an anthology of essays and articles depicting the manner in which For Two Thousand Years was received by the Romanian public and the country's cultural establishment. In the book, he answered his critics by holding up a mirror to their prejudice, detailing and assailing the claims of both his right-wing and left-wing detractors. He addresses the rabid antisemitism of the former in a clear and unaffected manner, underlining its absurdity:

I was born in Romania, and I am Jewish. That makes me a Jew, and a Romanian. For me to go around and join conferences demanding that my identity as a Jewish Romanian be taken seriously would be as crazy as the Lime Trees on the island where I was born to form a conference demanding their rights to be Lime Trees. As for anyone who tells me that I'm not a Romanian, the answer is the same: go talk to the trees, and tell them they're not trees.

Yet for all the sharpness and clarity of his response, he could not help but feel betrayed and saddened by Ionescu's vicious preface:

What hurt me was not the idea that the preface would be made public - what hurt me was the idea that it had been written. Had I known it would have been destroyed immediately afterwards, it still would have hurt me had it been written...

Sebastian became known in Romanian literature mainly for his plays, such as Steaua fără nume ("The Star Without a Name"), Jocul de-a vacanța ("Holiday Games"), and Ultima oră ("Breaking News").

== Journal, 1935-1944 ==
For 10 years, Sebastian kept a journal that was finally published in Bucharest in 1996 to "considerable debate" and in America under the title Journal, 1935-1944: The Fascist Years. It records the mounting persecution he endured and documents the disdain former friends began showing him in Romania's increasingly antisemitic sociopolitical landscape.

A friend of Mircea Eliade, he was deeply disappointed when the latter supported the Iron Guard. Despite this ominous tone, the diary also reveals Sebastian's unflagging sense of humor and self-irony. A fundamental testimony of anti-Semitism in Europe prior to, and during, the years of World War II, the Journal has been compared to those of Victor Klemperer or Anne Frank.

He was a great lover of classical music and often attended concerts. In his Journal, there are many references to various classical composers and reviews of radio broadcast concerts.

After being expelled from his home due to the new antisemitic laws, Sebastian moved into a tenement slum where he continued his writing. On August 23, 1944, the Romanian government of Ion Antonescu was overthrown, and Romania joined the Allies (see Romania during World War II).

The manuscript of Sebastian's Journal was smuggled out of Romania in 1961 by the author's brother, Andrei Benu Sebastian, who took it with him to Israel. It is currently held by the University of Jerusalem.

In 2023, two researchers at the George Călinescu Institute of Literary History and Theory of the Romanian Academy discovered a handwritten notebook containing a previously unknown part of Sebastian's Journal, covering the years 1930 and 1931, when the writer was living in Paris.

== Death ==
On 29 May 1945, Mihail Sebastian was accidentally hit by a truck.

== Legacy ==
In the 2000s, Sebastian's Journal gained a new audience in Western countries due to its lyrical, evocative style and the brutal honesty of its accounts. The manuscript of the journal was obtained by Harry From, who arranged for its publication in 1996, by the Romanian publishing house Humanitas. In 2004, American playwright David Auburn wrote a one-man play based on Sebastian's diary titled, The Journals of Mihail Sebastian. It debuted the same year in New York City and starred Stephen Kunken in the role of Mihail Sebastian.

Sebastian's niece, Michèle Hechter, a French writer and translator, published in 2000 an autobiographical work titled M. et M. dealing extensively with her uncle's life and writings.

In 2006, Mihail Sebastian was posthumously awarded the Geschwister-Scholl-Preis for his Voller Entsetzen, aber nicht verzweifelt. Tagebücher 1935-44. (transl. Horrified, but not desperate. Diaries 1935-44).

On October 18, 2020, Google celebrated his 113th birthday with a Google Doodle.

== Selected bibliography ==
=== Novels ===
- Femei (1933) / Women (trans. Gabi Reigh, Women, Aurora Metro Books, 2020)
- De două mii de ani (1934) / For Two Thousand Years (trans. Philip Ó Ceallaigh, Penguin Modern Classics, 2016)
- Orașul cu salcâmi (1935) / The Town with Acacia Trees (trans. Gabi Reigh, Aurora Metro Books, 2019)
- Accidentul (1940) / The Accident (trans. Stephen Henighan, Biblioasis, 2011)

=== Plays ===
- Jocul de-a vacanța (1938) / Holiday Make Believe
- Steaua fără nume (1944) / The Star with no Name (trans. Gabi Reigh, Aurora Metro Books, 2020)
- Ultima oră (1945) / Breaking News
- Insula (1947) / The Island

=== Other ===
- Fragmente dintr-un carnet găsit (1932) / Fragments from a Found Notebook (Trans. Christina Tudor-Sideri. Seattle: Sublunary Editions, 2020)
- Cum am devenit huligan (1935) / How I Became a Hooligan
- Corespondența lui Marcel Proust (1939) / The Correspondence of Marcel Proust
- Eseuri, cronici, memorial (1972) / Essays, Chronicles, Memorial
- Journal, 1935-1944 / published in America as Journal 1935-1944: The Fascist Years (trans. Patrick Camiller. Ivan R. Dee, Publisher, 2000) and in Britain as Journal: 1935-1944 (London: Pimlico, 2003)
