= Victor Ion Popa =

Romanian dramatist

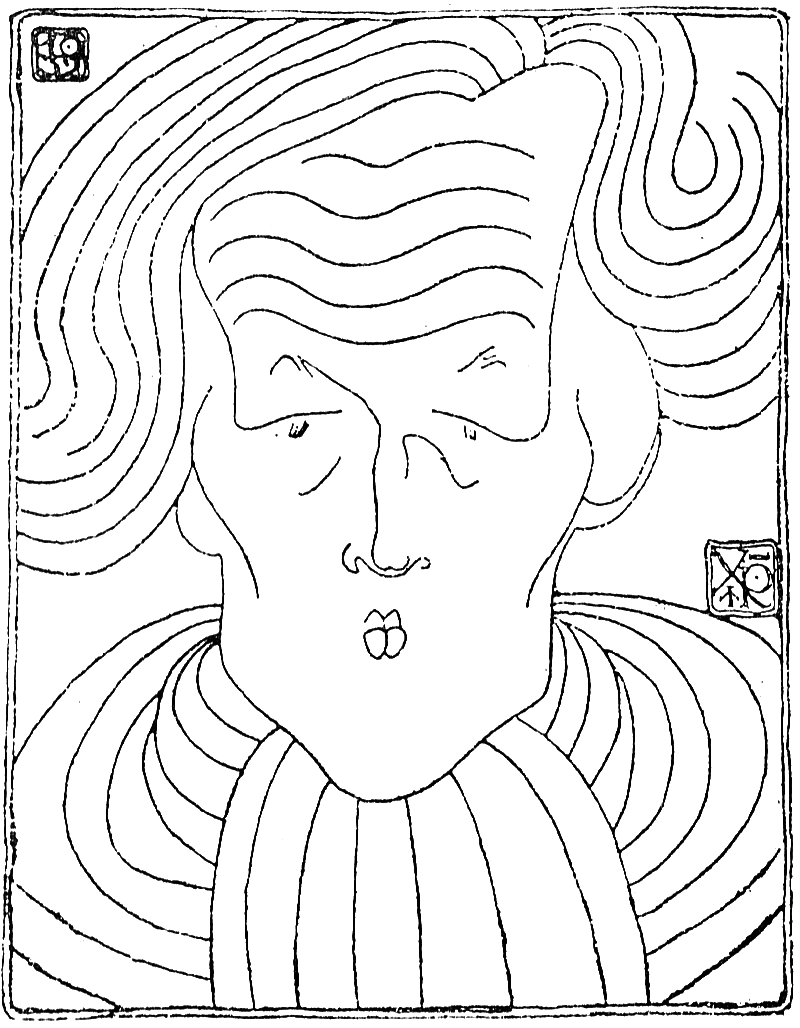
Victor Ion Popa (self-portrait)

Victor Ion Popa (Romanian pronunciation: [ˈviktor iˈon ˈpopa]; July 29, 1895 – March 30, 1946) was a Romanian dramatist.

== Biography ==
He was born in Bârlad, the first of three children of Ion Popa and Aspasia, née Pavelescu. He went to primary school in Călmățui, a village in the Grivița commune, in the former Tutova County, where his father was a schoolteacher. At Iași he finished his first five years of secondary school at the Costache Negruzzi Boarding High School and his last two years of high school at the National High School, graduating in 1914. He enrolled in the Iași Conservatory and for a time in the law faculty of the University of Iași. In 1916, when Romania entered World War I on the side of the Allies, Popa interrupted his studies and attended an officers' school, graduating as sub-lieutenant. In 1917, he fought at the battles of Mărăști and Oituz, an experience he will write about in "Flower of steel, novel of war".

== Work ==
One of his most famous plays is Take, Ianke și Cadîr (1932), about three small merchants, a Romanian, a Romanian Jew, and a Turk, respectively. The play was set in Podeni, one of the neighborhoods of Bârlad. Other plays include: Ciuta (1922), Mușcata din fereastră (1928) Acord familiar, Cuiul lui Pepelea, Răzbunarea sufleurului, and Răspântia cea mare. He also wrote a novel, Sfârlează cu fofează (Spinner with propeller).

== Death and legacy ==
Popa died in Bucharest at age 50. The Victor Ion Popa Theatre (Teatrul Victor Ion Popa) in Bârlad was dedicated in his honor. A gymnasial school in Dodești and a street in Bârlad are also named after him.
