= Alexandru Kirițescu =

Romanian playwright and journalist

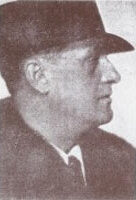
- Born: 28 March 1888; Pitești, Argeș County, Kingdom of Romania
- Died: 9 April 1961 (aged 73); Bucharest, Romanian People's Republic
- Resting place: Bellu Cemetery, Bucharest
- Education: University of Bucharest
- Writing career
- Notable work: Gaițele

Alexandru Kirițescu (28 March 1888 – 9 April 1961) was a Romanian playwright and journalist, best known for his play Gaițele (The Magpies), also called Cuibul de viespi (The Wasps' Nest).

Born in Pitești, he attended the Gheorghe Lazăr High School in Bucharest, after which he enrolled in the University of Bucharest's Faculty of Law. He debuted in 1914 with the play Invinșii and collaborated with various publications, such as Rampa, Adevărul, Cuvântul, and Gazeta. In 1929 the play Marcel and Marcel, also called Anise or Temptation, made its debut; together with Florentina and The Magpies, this play formed Kirițescu's so-called "Bourgeois Trilogy". The Magpies debuted at the Bulandra Theatre in 1932; directed by Soare Z. Soare, it featured Lucia Sturdza-Bulandra, Tony Bulandra, and Mania Antonova in the main roles. It was originally played with the title The Wasps' Nest and, instead of the current Act III, it had only one final scene. The play was repeated at the National Theatre Bucharest in 1933, under the direction of V. Enescu.

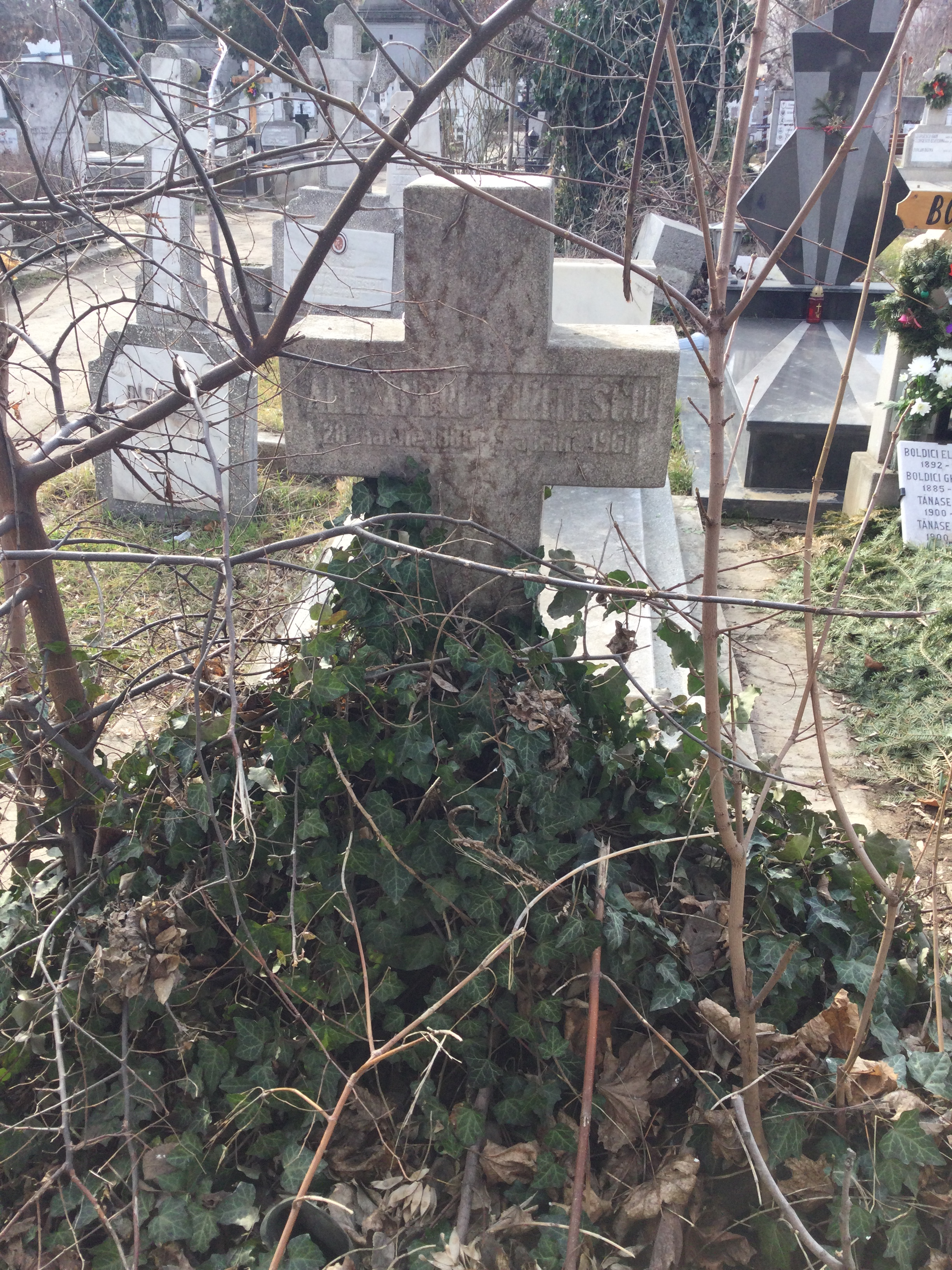
Grave in Bellu Cemetery

Between 1938 and 1940, he served as Romania's cultural attaché in Rome. His plays Lăcustele (1936), Intermezzo (1943), and The Dictator (1945) were played on various stages in Bucharest. He also published translations of Molière, Nikolai Gogol, and Leo Tolstoy. He died in 1961 in Bucharest at age 73 and was buried in the city's Bellu Cemetery.
