= Alina Mungiu-Pippidi =

Romanian political scientist and academic (born 1964)

- Born: 1964 (age 61–62); Iași, Romania
- Education: Institute of Medicine and Pharmacy of Iași
- Occupations: Political scientist, academic, journalist, writer
- Years active: 1998–present
- Relatives: Cristian Mungiu (brother)

Alina Mungiu-Pippidi (Romanian pronunciation: [aˈlina munˈd͡ʒi.u piˈpidi]; born 1964) is a Romanian political scientist, academic, journalist, and writer. In 2023 she was appointed professor of Comparative Public Policy at the Department of Political Science of LUISS Guido Carli in Rome. Her main monographs are Europe's Burden. Promoting Good Governance across borders, A Quest for Good Governance, and A Tale of Two Villages. She has also published articles in many journals and newspapers, including Nature and The Economist. BBC screened A Tale of Two Villages as a documentary. She also consults for various governments and international organizations and contributed work for the European Parliament, and is the designer of corruptionrisk.org, a forecast on good governance.

From 2001, she chaired the Romanian Coalition for a Clean Parliament, a civic anticorruption campaign scaled up by Open Society Foundations network in over 10 countries, most notably as Chesno! in Ukraine.

== Early life and education ==
Alina Mungiu was born in 1964 in Iași, Romania. She is the elder sister of film director Cristian Mungiu.

Between 1982 and 1988, she studied medicine at the Institute of Medicine and Pharmacy of Iași, specializing in psychology. During her student years, she began contributing literature pieces and essays of literary criticism to the magazines Cronica (The Chronicle) and Opinia Studențească (Students' Opinion).

== Career ==
=== Early career: 1990s ===
After the Romanian revolution of 1989, which brought the fall of the communist regime and the return to democracy, she pursued a PhD in social psychology and political communication at the University of Iași (1991–1995) and worked as a journalist for the Iași newspaper Opinia Studențească (Students' Opinion) and the Bucharest daily Express (1993–1994). She was also the Romanian correspondent for the French newspaper Le Monde (1992–1993) and a contributor to the Bucharest weekly Revista 22.

After obtaining the PhD in social psychology with a research on the political attitudes of Romanians after 1989, Mungiu-Pippidi visited Harvard University twice, first as a Fulbright fellow in the Government Department (1994–1995), and then as Shorenstein fellow at the John F. Kennedy School of Government (1998–1999). In 1995, her dissertation, Romanians after ’89, was published by Humanitas (in Romanian) and translated into German by Friedrich Ebert Stiftung and Intergraph Verlag.

Back in Romania, she founded the country's largest think tank, the Romanian Academic Society (SAR), and for a short period of time she was employed as a news editor by the Romanian Television Company (1997–1998).

=== Romanian Academic Society: 1995–2007 ===
Since 1995, Mungiu-Pippidi led Romania's largest political think tank, the Romanian Academic Society (in Romanian: Societatea Academică din România / SAR). The Society participated in most public debates regarding democracy, the rule of law, transparency, taxation, anti-corruption policies, and issued several reports that guided Romania's accession to the European Union. Since 2007, she has been the honorary president of the Romanian Academic Society.

Between 1997 and 2007, Mungiu-Pippidi was an associate professor at the Romanian National School of Government and Administration, where she held courses on nationalism and electoral behavior. During this time, she conducted a research on inter-ethnic relations in Transylvania, which was published in Romanian and translated into English (Subjective Transylvania. A Case Study of Ethnic Conflict). She also edited the first post-1989 Romanian textbooks on politics (Doctrine politice, 1998) and public policies (Politici publice, co-edited with Sorin Ioniță, 2002), along with a textbook on political sciences for the optional studies in high schools (2000).

In 2002, Mungiu-Pippidi published A Tale of Two Villages, a monograph about two villages from Romania with their different pasts: Nucșoara (home of anti-communist resistance) and Scornicești (childhood home of Nicolae Ceaușescu). In 2003, the book was turned into a documentary, which also aired on BBC Television. In 2009, she was the screenwriter of another documentary, Where Europe Ends, which was directed by Sinisa Dragin.

Mungiu-Pippidi has also lectured on post-Cold War transition to a market economy at several universities and business schools, including Harvard, Stanford, Princeton, Oxford, European University Institute and London School of Economics.

In the wake of the 2004 legislative elections, Mungiu-Pippidi created and led the Coalition for a Clean Parliament (in Romanian: Coaliția pentru un Parlament Curat), which campaigned for candidates with reported moral problems (such as incompatibility or undergoing the investigation of judicial authorities) to be excluded from party lists (98 candidatures were withdrawn following the coalition's campaign). Among other achievements, this civil society coalition managed to make adopted and enforce one of the strongest freedom of information acts (FOIA) in the Balkans, and export it across the border of neighboring Western Balkan countries.

In 2010, the Coalition for a Clean Parliament turned into a permanent democracy watchdog under the name Clean Romania (in Romanian: România Curată).

=== Hertie School of Governance in Berlin: 2007–2023 ===
For fifteen years, between 2007 and 2023, Mungiu-Pippidi held the chair of Democracy Studies at Hertie School of Governance in Berlin, Germany, where she tenured as a professor of Democracy Studies.

During this time, Mungiu-Pippidi was a visiting scholar at Oxford (St Antony's College, 2010–2014), LUISS (Libera Università Internazionale degli Studi Sociali) - Guido Carli in Rome (2019) and Sciences Po in Paris (2022).

Between 2012 and 2017, Mungiu-Pippidi was the designer and co-principal investigator of ANTICORRP, a 10 million euro European Seventh Framework Research Project on the effectiveness of good governance policies. The results of the project's investigations were published in a 4-volume series, The Anticorruption Report.

She was also a contributor to DIGIWHIST, a Horizon 20-20 project (2015–2018) which resulted in the creation of EU's public procurement scoreboard, the open public contracts’ repository Opentender.eu and the public accountability tools repository Europam.eu.

=== LUISS Guido Carli, Rome: 2023–present ===
In September 2023, Mungiu-Pippidi was appointed professor of Comparative Public Policy at LUISS (Libera Università Internazionale degli Studi Sociali) - Guido Carli in Rome, Italy.

In 2023, her work surpassed 5800 citations on Google Scholar, more than any other Romanian political scientist.

== Other roles ==
Mungiu-Pippidi chairs the multi-site European Research Centre for Anticorruption and State-Building (ERCAS) and is academic coordinator of BridgeGap, an EU Horizon research project.

As of 2023 she holds the honorary presidency of Romanian Academic Society. She also consults for various governments and international organizations and contributed work for the European Parliament as principal investigator on "clean trade", the Swedish Government on effectiveness of good governance assistance programs, the EU Dutch Presidency on trust and public integrity in EU-28, for the European Commission DG Research on governance innovation, for the World Bank Development Report and the International Monetary Fund, among others.

Mungiu-Pippidi is also the designer of corruptionrisk.org, a forecast on good governance, of the Index of Public Integrity, of the T-index (computer mediated transparency for 143 countries) and of the public accountability tools repository Europam.eu. She sits on the board of various research centers in Ukraine and the Balkans, as well as the ECPR Standing group on Anticorruption and Public Integrity.

== Writing ==
A commentator on national politics and European affairs, Mungiu-Pippidi is one of the most prominent civil society activists in post-1989 Romania. Since 1990, Mungiu-Pippidi has contributed with articles in a multitude of mass media publications, including La Nouvelle Alternative, Le Monde, Foreign Policy, and The Economist. She has published in Nature and Nature Human Behavior and other social science journals.

In the Romanian press, she held opinion columns in Revista 22, România Liberă, and România Curată.

== Works ==
=== Scholarly books ===
- Rethinking Corruption, London: Edward Elgar Publishing, 2023
- A Research Agenda for Studies of Corruption, (co-edited with Paul M. Heywood), London: Edward Elgar Publishing, 2020 - ISBN 978-1-78990-499-4
- Europe's Burden: Promoting Good Governance across Borders, Cambridge: Cambridge University Press, 2019 - ISBN 9781108459662
  - Reviewed in The Times and Foreign Affairs
- Transitions to Good Governance. Creating Virtuous Circles of Anti-corruption, (edited with Michael Johnston), London: Edward Elgar Publishing, 2017 - ISBN 978-1-78643-914-7
- Beyond the Panama Papers. The Performance of EU Good Governance Promotion. The Anticorruption Report, volume 4, (co-edited with Jana Warkotsch), Leverkusen: Barbara Budrich Publishers, 2017 - ISBN 978-3-8474-0582-5
- The Quest for Good Governance: How Societies Develop Control of Corruption, Cambridge: Cambridge University Press, 2015 - ISBN 9781316286937
  - Reviewed in Journal of Interdisciplinary History, International Review of Administrative Sciences, Governance and Journal of Democracy
  - Translated into Macedonian, Romanian, Spanish
- Government Favouritism in Europe. The Anticorruption Report, volume 3, (editor), Leverkusen: Barbara Budrich Publishers, 2015 - ISBN 978-3-8474-0795-9.
- The Anticorruption Frontline. The Anticorruption Report, volume 2, (editor), Leverkusen: Barbara Budrich Publishers, 2014 - ISBN 978-3-8474-0144-5
- Controlling Corruption in Europe. The Anticorruption Report, volume 1, (editor), Leverkusen: Barbara Budrich Publishers, 2013 - ISBN 978-3-8474-0125-4
- A Tale of Two Villages. Coerced Modernization in the East European Countryside, Budapest: CEU Press, 2010 - ISBN 978-963-9776-78-4
  - Previously published in Romanian (2002) and French (2004)
  - Reviewed in The Economist and H-Net
- Ottomans into Europeans: State and Institution Building in South-Eastern Europe (co-edited with Wim van Meurs), London: Hurst; Boulder: Columbia University Press, 2010 - ISBN 9781849040563
- Nationalism after Communism. Lessons Learned from Nation and State Building, (co-edited with Ivan Krastev), New York and Budapest: Central European University Press, 2004 - ISBN 963-9241-76-8
  - Translated into Albanian and Serb-Croat
- Romania after 2000. Threats and Challenges (co-author), Iași: Polirom, 2002 - ISBN 973-683-951-6
- Politica după communism ("Politics after Communism"), Bucharest: Humanitas, 2002 - ISBN 973-50-0246-9
- Transilvania subiectivă ("Subjective Transylvania. A Case Study of Ethnic Conflict"), Bucharest: Humanitas, 1999 - ISBN 973-50-0020-2
- Românii după '89 ("The Romanians after '89"), Bucharest: Humanitas, 1995 - ISBN 973-28-0566-8

=== Textbooks ===
- Politici publice: teorie și practică ("Public policies: theory and practice"), (edited with Sorin Ioniță), Iași: Polirom, 2002 - ISBN 973-683-950-8
- Introducere în politologie. Manual opțional pentru liceu ("An introduction to politology. Optional textbook for high school"), (editor), Iași: Polirom, 2000 - ISBN 973-683-527-8
- Doctrine politice. Concepte universale și realități românești ("Political doctrines. Universal concepts and Romanian realities"), (editor), Iași: Polirom, 1998 - ISBN 973-683-052-7

=== Essays and interviews ===
- Tranziția. Primii 25 de ani ("The Transition. The first 25 years"), Iași: Polirom, 2014, conversations with Vartan Arachelian - ISBN 978-973-46-4976-1
- De ce nu iau românii premiul Nobel ("Why the Romanians don't get the Nobel prize"), Iași: Polirom, 2012 - ISBN 978-973-46-2933-6
- Ultima cruciadă ("The last crusade"), Bucharest: Humanitas, 2001 - ISBN 973-50-0145-4
- România, mod de folosire ("Romania: Terms of use"), Staff, 1994

=== Plays ===
Alina Mungiu-Pippidi has also written a number of plays, the most high-profile of which has been The Evangelists. The play, which was written in the 1990s, only debuted in Romania in 2005, where it sparked a considerable amount of controversy from Christian religious groups, who labeled it as "blasphemy" and "an attack against public morals". The play is based on the life of Jesus from a different point of view than that of the New Testament.

- Evangheliștii ("The Evangelists"), Bucharest: Cartea Românească, 2006 (first published in 1993) - ISBN 973-23-1738-8
