= Teodor Mazilu =

Romanian writer, editor, and cartoonist (1930–1980)

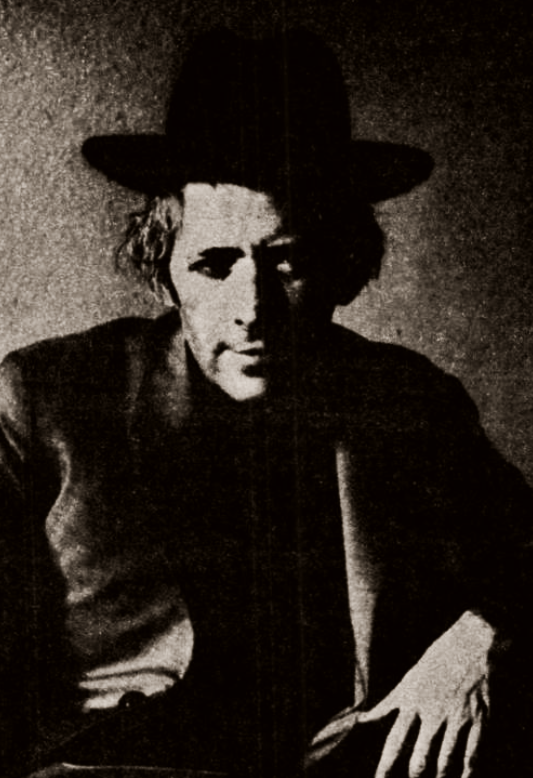
- Mazilu c. 1975
- Born: 11 August 1930; Bucharest, Kingdom of Romania
- Died: 18 October 1980 (aged 50); Fundeni, Bucharest, Socialist Republic of Romania
- Occupations: Journalist; editor; translator; propagandist; cartoonist; actor
- Writing career
- Period: c. 1940–1980
- Genres: Satire; reportage; short story; sketch story; novella; autobiographical novel; political novel; war novel; philosophical novel; psychological novel; Bildungsroman; tragicomedy; farce; one-act play; absurdist fiction; experimental literature; essay; lyric poetry; philosophical poetry; sports journalism; travel writing; screenplay; teleplay
- Movements: Realism; proletarian literature; socialist realism; Theater of the Absurd

Teodor Mazilu, also known as Theodor or Tudor Mazilu (11 August 1930 – 18 October 1980), was a Romanian writer, editor, cartoonist, and occasional actor. He was from a working-class background, born in what was then a marginal area of Bucharest. Already a writer in his childhood, he documented his experience of poverty and strife, growing up as World War II was raging. With the growing influence exercised by the Romanian Communist Party in the late 1940s, Mazilu wrote proletarian literature. He was embraced by the staff of Tinerețea magazine, which published his first sketch stories. Shortly before the communist regime had been fully established, he was on the perennial staff of Scînteia Tineretului, where he remained until 1956. Neglecting his schooling and opting for a bohemian life, Mazilu only received a political education, culminating in his acceptance by the Eminescu School of Literature. His initial work was explicitly in agitprop, but he began modifying the contents of his reportage pieces to feature subtle mockery of the party directives, particularly when it came to the cultivation of socialist realism.

Mazilu's satire became mordant, and evidenced his interest in exposing imposture and idiocy across all strata of society; this made him clash with communist censors, who found his approach unnervingly irregular. His autobiographical novel of 1959, Bariera, belonged to a late wave in socialist-realistic prose, but carried enough satirical hints to cause a wide-reaching controversy. Encouraged by director Lucian Pintilie, Mazilu moved on to writing for the stage in the early 1960s. His debut comedy play, Proștii sub clar de lună, caused a scandal and was banned as immoral—following a direct intervention by party eminence Nicolae Ceaușescu. In 1965–1969, at a time of relative liberalization inaugurated by Ceaușescu's takeover of the party, Mazilu was still unsure of his status: allowed to publish sporadically, invited to limit himself to sports journalism, he did not have any plays produced for almost a decade. When he later returned to favor, it was with a long succession of volumes, including all his new plays. Though sometimes vastly different in his stylistic choices, Ion Băieșu was his generational companion and a defender of his work; their names were often cited together as illustrating the better aspects of comedic writing in late-communist Romania.

Mazilu's final decade was marked by a diversification of activities, including his authorship of two screenplays and a teleplay, a cameo in Tată de duminică, and a star appearance in his own documentary film. He took more distance from communist themes, and emerged with new poems, essays, a philosophical novel, a Bildungsroman, all outlining his "Cartesian" approach to existential issues. He earned critical attention for all these works, as well as for a change in his storytelling—with sketches, sometimes absurdist, that became more lenient toward the human condition, and with more ample works that overturn the convention of romance novels. His plays, including the widely acclaimed Mobilă și durere, were taken up by directors and troupes who had decided to confront censorship; terminally ill with gastrointestinal cancer, Mazilu only lived through the early stages of this phenomenon. He left a checkered legacy, being either held up as a great Romanian humorist, in line with Ion Luca Caragiale and Tudor Arghezi, or contrarily defined around his political compromises and the uneven value of his writing.

== Biography ==
=== Childhood and debut ===
Mazilu was born in Bucharest, capital of the Romanian Kingdom, on 11 August 1930; his parents were Tudor, a worker for the city transport company, and Maria née Mureșanu. Teodor, their fourth child, grew up in Lupeasca mahala, within Rahova, where the family moved shortly after his birth. They lived there at No 21 Plivitului Street. He attended primary school No 39, on the edge of Ferentari. A neighbor and classmate, Constantin Răsvan, recalled being impressed by Mazilu's talent for drawing, also noting that he would read philosophical literature at night, and play street football by day. He was already writing stories and short plays at ages ten–thirteen, using Răsvan as one of his actors, and advertising his shows with posters plastered across Lupeasca. While walking about Cotroceni in 1941, he encountered the aging, high-born novelist Hortensia Papadat-Bengescu, who owned a villa in that quarter. During their talks, he confessed to her that he wanted to be a poet. She tried to dissuade him from making this choice, advising him to "become a doctor, an engineer, an aviator", and only take up literature as a hobby.

As detailed by his own autobiographical novel, Bariera ("The Barrier"), Mazilu had a hard time growing up, especially during World War II and Ion Antonescu's dictatorship. His initial poverty was aggravated by wartime shortages, by the absence of reliable bread-earners (who were drafted for service on the Eastern Front), as well as by waves of carpet-bombing. He once retreated to his grandparents' home in the countryside, and always had fond memories of the evenings he spent there, alongside his cousins, gazing at the night sky. He was again in Bucharest during the anti-fascist coup of August 1944, personally witnessing skirmishes between Romanian paramilitary formations and the Wehrmacht.

Young Mazilu found employment immediately after these events—he was a cartoonist, sports chronicler, and eventually humorist at Tinerețea magazine (it was here that he published his first sketch stories). He also did cartoons for the rival Pițigoiul, but, as he recalled in 1980, could not resist "staunch competition" by its staff artists, Constantin Calafeteanu and Ion Popescu-Gopo. He did not wish to continue his studies, but finally enlisted at the Commercial High School in 1946. He dropped out the following year, when he joined the editorial staff of Scînteia Tineretului, founded as an organ of the Union of Communist Youth. According to Răsvan, he may well have been "the only editor to still wear short pants". Mazilu's first samples of lyrical poetry were printed in 1946 by Marvan, described by scholar Alex. Ștefănescu as "an improvised publishing house". Called Univers în miniatură ("Miniature Universe"), they were advertised as featuring reproductions by Frans Masereel and others, but these were never actually printed. Răsvan, who read the 24 works contained therein, describes them as having "extraordinary feeling", and as detailing the experiences of war; Marvan advertised them as having "a touch of Vladimir Mayakovsky's tempestuous verb".

In 1948, the kingdom was officially replaced by a communized republic, with Marxism-Leninism as its official ideology. A more ideological lyrical composition by Mazilu appeared in Flacăra of 1949, eulogizing the 2nd World Festival of Youth and Students. He continued to write without formally completing his education. As observed by literary historian and critic Eugen Negrici, much of Mazilu's later prose is somewhat anti-intellectual, maintaining a "cult of simplicity" and reserving particular contempt for "talkative smatterers". He himself finally completed high school in a non-attendance program, and enlisted, in a similar regimen, at the Workers' University, later moving on to the Romanian Communist Party's Eminescu School of Literature. Novelist and period witness Nicolae Breban sees Mazilu, alongside his colleagues Nicolae Labiș and Lucian Raicu, as having ultimately emancipated themselves from the latter's institution's "anti-national intoxications", emerging thereafter as writers of genuine interest. For a while, Mazilu lived in the same house as Raicu and Labiș, located near Uranus Hill. As he recalled this "divine youthful bedlam" was also briefly shared with three other future literary figures of note, including George Mărgărit and Ion Gheorghe. He had a bohemian lifestyle, with no source of income other than writing and editorial work, and was not seen as reliable by his superiors at Scînteia Tineretului—though he was maintained there until 1956. His own intellectual development as a "self-taught" writer remains somewhat mysterious, with Ștefănescu arguing that "he wrote and read by some logic that we can't begin to reconstruct."

=== Developing a style ===
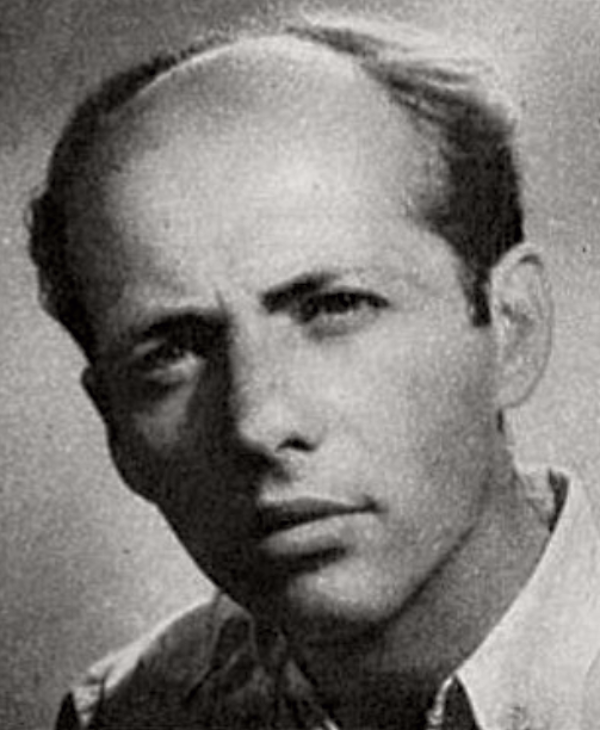
Mazilu in 1959

According to Breban, Mazilu always gave others the impression that he had genius, "well hidden beneath a jeering, acidly ironic shell". His debut volume, Insectar de buzunar ("Pocket Insectarium"), saw print in 1956, followed a year later by Galeria palavragiilor ("A Gallery of Windbags"). Both are dismissed by Negrici as mere samples of socialist realism—and as showing his best and worse traits as "the author of satirical portraits, carried by only minimal storytelling and excessive commentary." Negrici sees this literature as rooted in Tudor Arghezi's work as a lampoonist, to which Mazilu added "elements of sharp-witted character-sketching", inspired by English literature. The same author notes however that the early Mazilu was already "upsetting the standard categories of socialist-realism", allowing "absurdity, unpredictability and the spiritual abyss" to reclaim their place in the narrative. The same had been noted earlier by scholar Mircea Zaciu who sees Mazilu, Fănuș Neagu, Dumitru Radu Popescu, and Sorin Titel as a "new generation", who challenged the "cultural terror of dogmatism" by pushing depictions of marginals into the literary canon.

As Ștefănescu reports, the inherent nonconformities did not go unobserved by the agitprop apparatus that was overseeing Mazilu, which had expected him to continue writing "by the quota". He therefore had "countless conflicts" with the communist censors—which were mostly unknown to his readers, but which he tackled by pushing through text after text, faster and more obstinately than the censors could deal with, "responding to the more diverse, even frivolous, invitations [to write]." Likewise, researcher Cristina Martha Balinte believes that Insectar, with its mock-reportage pieces in the human-interest genre, implicitly derides the communist take on urbanization. In one such fragment, Mazilu depicts the élan of an urbanite, who joins the campaign for agricultural mechanization only as an excuse to abandon his wife; another such work dwells on a "maniacal commuter", who hides his gross incompetence by always anticipating the arrival of labor inspectors.

Overall, Balinte sees Mazilu's entire work as a dialogue-dominated play, with elements of a "medical investigation"; its main touch is: "A lucidity often pushed toward cynicism—not out of malicious delight, but out of a profound respect for reality, alongside the need to understand the inner-workings of imposture". In similar vein, Ștefănescu proposes that Mazilu was a "Cartesian", in that, unlike others who challenged the regime's commands, he did not display a "confused way of thinking". Instead, he "respected the laws of symmetry", even when it was to show his characters behaving erratically. As an early promoter of Mazilu's work, Raicu defined his narrative contribution as "a mixture of administrative dialogue, committee-meeting metaphysics, and the sublime". Several authors found grounds for comparing him to the classic Romanian comedic-and-realist writer, Ion Luca Caragiale, but Mazilu shunned the analogy. As he once explained, he had no easy-going, Caragialesque take on life, but rather sought to "hunt down" his characters, producing implicit social commentary about the spread of imbecility, cowardice, and corruption.

Mazilu is, in Ștefănescu's reading, primarily a moralist, whose discovery is that moral relativism permeates all aspects of social life; Mazilu was aware of such definitions as "something one has to get used to", but insisted that he himself did not seek to impart any lessons on morality. Critic Florin Faifer concludes that the figures of Mazilu's prose, "in whom the human element barely flickers, [only provoke] a clenched laughter, with its jolts of fear." In a contrasting assessment, theater columnist Valentin Silvestru characterized him as a "humanist comediographer", who "loved his fellow men with a passion". As one of Mazilu's younger colleagues, Radu G. Țeposu cautioned that the Caragiale comparison had been "nauseatingly" repeated by exegetes, and therefore had to be rejected by Mazilu himself—but also that it was fundamentally valid. In his final interview, Mazilu acknowledged that his early work was Caragialesque, as well as Gogolian, but also spoke of having evaded from the "debtors' prison" that such literary influences presupposed.

During his final months at Scînteia Tineretului, Mazilu attended the premiere of Alexandru Mirodan's Ziariștii. On that occasion, he was presented by his bosses to a lionized dramatist, Camil Petrescu. When informed that "[Mazilu] also writes plays", Petrescu sarcastically observed: "Better than that he write poetry." From 1956, Mazilu was employed as editor at Gazeta Literară journal, which was published by the Writers' Union of Romania (USR); in tandem, he had a sports column in Contemporanul and wrote a literary diary for Luceafărul, with additional contributions in Cinema, Flacăra, and România Literară. His patented short prose disappointed many scholars and critics, who dismissed Mazilu as a second-shelf author. As Negrici observes, this was mainly because they themselves "hungered for ample prose, and, in general, for fiction", which the still-insecure Mazilu could not yet provide.

=== From Bariera to Proștii ===
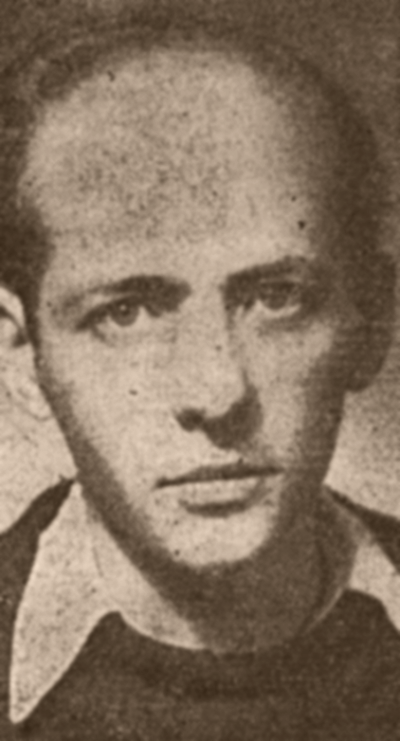
Mazilu in 1962

Ștefănescu describes Mazilu's stylistic diversification, beginning with novels, as accomplished "without inhibitions, but also without pretentiousness". His breakthrough in the genre came in 1959 with Bariera, which won him a Romanian Academy prize, with entire portions read out on national radio. Some of the era's Marxist critics were pleased: Radu Popescu of Contemporanul praised him precisely for having created a positive communist type, Vițu, who embodied the "healthy morality" of the working class. Popescu only reproached to Mazilu that he had not fully exemplified Vițu's "activity within the party", or within the larger resistance movement. As observed by literary historian Eugen Simion, Bariera was also immediately controversial, the epicenter of "a true battle" among cultural figures of the day. In Simion's reading, at least part of the rejection came from some of the "dogmatic critics" who had read satirical hints about themselves in Mazilu's columns. The book was also panned by Negrici, who is overall critical of communism: he contrarily rejects the book as "schematic", or too in line with official culture of the day. From a similar perspective, Ștefănescu labels it a "propaganda novel".

Meantime, most of Mazilu's partisans were only impressed by the autobiographical elements. Bariera is thus not praised as the political and war novel it intended to be: beginning with Paul Georgescu, commentators noted that its development of characters was largely failed, and that, instead of reaching his promise as the author of a Moromeții-like epic, Mazilu had effectively rehashed basic communist clichés. Writing at the time from a communist perspective, art scholar Dan Grigorescu indicated that Mazilu had "obvious talent", but that he had spent too much time on "creating 'complex' characters", to the point of hindering narration. Like Popescu, Grigorescu was puzzled by Vițu, whose organization of a resistance network was only discussed through small glimpses. Thematically, he also noted links with interwar authors such as Carol Ardeleanu, Sărmanul Klopștock, and George Mihail Zamfirescu, but also that the narrative structure was more innovative. Mazilu himself explained:

I wrote this book out of a feeling of dissatisfaction with the way many writers in the past portrayed the lives of people on the outskirts of the city. The autobiographical conditions made me know very well a neighborhood of Bucharest where many workers lived.

Mazilu's major success as a playwright was Proștii sub clar de lună ("Idiots under a Moonlit Sky")—a title he had originally conceived for a planned volume of sketches "on the petty-bourgeoisie's outlook on life." He had only switched to drama after repeated calls by director Lucian Pintilie, who then visited him "once every week" to pick up new portions of the text, also shielding him from criticism by his actors. As read by Țeposu, Proștii is the first among his patented "cynical farces", with some likely echoes from Eugène Ionesco. Here, two women who are in competition for the love of another "serious man", Gogu, who had been revealed as an embezzler, agree between them to frame an innocent bureaucrat, Emilian. Staged by Pintilie at Bulandra Theater, it won Mazilu a first prize at the National Drama Festival of 1962. The production also marked the first collaboration between Mazilu and actor Octavian Cotescu, who became a student and aficionado of his plays. Theater columnist Traian Șelmaru once claimed that Cotescu understood and promoted these texts as ways of "dissect[ing] evil out of man and society". He appeared as Mazilu's ideal "anti-character", "fitting with rare adherence and organicity into the over-hyperbolized style, both grotesque and realistic, of [Mazilu's] drama."

This work too was highly controversial; as Simion notes, both the text and its adaptation by Pintilie sparked a "wave of indignation" in at least some circles. Historian Adrian Cioroianu sees Proștii sub clar de lună as intentionally subversive, but timidly so, and the only act of that period to even bother the regime. He notes that its staging ran parallel to more significant shows of defiance, occurring throughout the Soviet Union and the Eastern Bloc—by the likes of Tibor Déry, Leszek Kołakowski, and Ladislav Mňačko. In Tribuna, academic Ion Lungu opined that the play had begun by showcasing Mazilu's "talent and combativeness" against "the anti-human character of bourgeois morality", only to then descend into an "implausible, burlesque, plane." It was publicly defended by the socialist-realist author, Horia Lovinescu, who settled debates by indicating that Mazilu had "dramatic genius". His words were rendered and backed by Silvestru, who eulogized Proștii as "an innovative type of grotesque comedy, of absolute originality, [displaying] a sharp and clear socio-political orientation."

=== 1963 ban ===
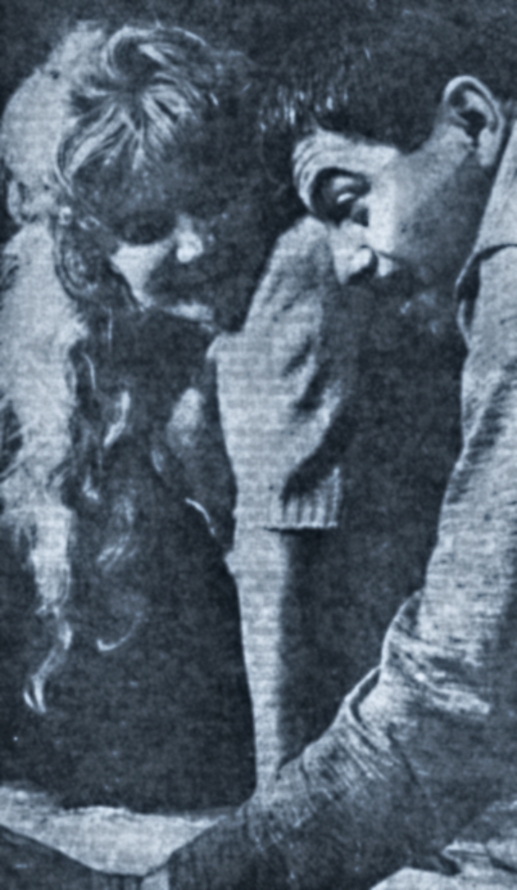
Octavian Cotescu and Rodica Tapalagă as Gogu and Ortansa in the original production of Proștii sub clar de lună, shortly before its decade-long ban

Pintilie recalled in 2003 that "the first of my theatrical scenes that the party has ever censored" was in Proștii—specifically, one in which Gogu's lovers commit suicide by throwing themselves into the orchestra pit. High-ranking communist Nicolae Ceaușescu reportedly attended the premiere, and eventually agreed to fully censor the play, citing reasons of public morality. As reported by Mazilu's friend, Radu Cosașu, the news reached the author just as he was sifting through over 2,000 congratulatory letters, including those from communists such as Ion Gheorghe Maurer and Ovid S. Crohmălniceanu. In tandem, he tried to reaffirm the standards of proletarian literature with the 1962 novel Aceste zile și aceste nopți ("These Days and Nights"), regarded by later scholarship as forgettable. Another play, Somnoroasa aventură ("Sleepyhead Adventure"), was still announced as being in production at the Bucharest Comedy Theater for the 1963–1964 season; it features an apparently upstanding member of the "translators' co-operative" being exposed as a sexual deviant.

From 1963 to the early 1970s, Mazilu was effectively banned from being performed on the stage, and was also generally not allowed to publish articles under his own signature—unless these were for Sportul Popular, an entirely apolitical newspaper. His contribution in that field was applauded as a serious undertaking by a professional football broadcaster, Ioan Chirilă, who stated in 1973: "Teodor Mazilu treats sports with affection and love, because he sincerely loves it [...] he reached the conclusion that stadiums offer far fewer figures to satirize than other areas of our lives." With Felicia Dan, Mazilu completed a translation of Martti Larni's Neljäs nikama, which saw print in 1963. A version of Ettore Fieramosca, by Massimo d'Azeglio, appeared in 1967; it was done by Mazilu and Constantin Ioncică.

In 1965, Ceaușescu succeeded Gheorghe Gheorghiu-Dej as communist leader, and some of the earlier cultural policies were reconsidered as a result. According to critic Natalia Stancu, that "apparent liberalization" also touched Mazilu—by allowing his esthetic theories to be aired, primarily in a 1972 book of interviews with Andrei Strihan. In a 1965 overview of developments in theatrical realism, author Andrei Băleanu partly defended Mazilu, and in particular Somnoroasa aventură, for having upgraded Romanian drama. Băleanu commended his imports from the Theater of the Absurd, but lambasted his "nihilism". Mazilu still collected his various prose works, appearing in 1966 as Vara pe verandă ("Summer on the Veranda"). In July of that year, the state television network's "Little Studio" aired an adaptation of his novella, Drumul spinos al iubirii ("Love's Thorny Passage"), which was overall well received. During September, two of plays were reportedly considered for Bucharest productions—one at Bulandra, the other at Teatrul Mic. At the time, Mazilu addressed literary events in an interview with Amfiteatru journal. It drew negative attention from his former colleagues at Gazeta Literară, because of his apparent scorn for a lionized young playwright, Marin Sorescu, and also for his general remarks on artistic suffering, which was read by them as wallowing in self-pity.

Mazilu was sometimes present in Luceafărul, as with the 1968 fragment Legea și taina ("Law and Secret"). It was upheld by journalist Ioana Cosmin as one of "excellent psychological notation", albeit undermined by a few "laughable passages". With Al. Mircan, he also penned a Romanian version of È in casa il signor Brambilla?, by Carlo Manzoni (1969). In a 1968 interview for Cinema, film director Mircea Mureșan called Mazilu a "true philosopher of humor", and suggested that he should be called upon as a screenwriter, adding: "Too bad he's not being understood these days." In 1969, without yet lifting censorship commands, the communist government awarded Mazilu its Meritul Cultural decoration, 4th class.

=== 1969 recovery ===
In August 1969, as Mazilu had released another collection of sketches, Proza satirică ("Satirical Prose"), critic Nicolae Manolescu defended him as the victim of "ingrate" reviewers: "if his second novel went almost unnoticed, the satirical sketches and the occasional attempt to write for the stage have always ignited the imagination of this-and-that critic, without ever being thoroughly discussed." Manolescu noted that he was especially vulnerable to such panning, since, as a satirist, he was always required to produce "newness". Instead, he asked instead that Mazilu be read as a more durable author of absurdist fiction, one who "transform[s] a banal situation into an absurd one by eliminating logical relationships. Teodor Mazilu skillfully borrows elements from the literature of the absurd, giving them a satirical finality." Later that same year, Bulandra Theater stated its intention of staging one of Mazilu's newer plays, Acești nebuni fățarnici ("These Hypocritical Madmen"). The initiative was endorsed by a fellow comedic author, Ion Băieșu, who demanded that his work be considered as Romania's "true comedic theater", by contrast with the "idiotic local and foreign comedies" taken up for production. Acești nebuni fățarnici is about a pair of "ideal idiots" or "impetuous demagogues", producing Caragialesque remarks. These characters are allowed to set up a city of their own, and it quickly becomes "monstrous"; the play's key line, and warning, is Poate fi omul atît de ticălos? ("Can man really be as dastardly as that?").

One of the Mazilian plays, Tandrețe și abjecție ("Tenderness and Abjection"), was eventually done by Bulandra, in a version directed by Cornel Todea—and starring Cotescu; it was however largely performed outside Romania, on a tour of West Germany. In a 1970 interview, director Emil Mandric announced his intention of staging a potpourri of Mazilu's one-act plays, again at Teatrul Mic. Instead, he managed to obtain approval for Acești nebuni, starring Cotescu and Florian Pittiș. Mazilu himself was allowed to collect his tragicomedic fragments for the stage as Teatru, put out in 1971. A central piece in it was Cine pe cine mîntuiește ("Who Saves Whom"), in which a sickly man performs a demonstration, meant to talk a visibly healthy acquaintance out of his suicidal ideation. Such works drew attention in other parts of the Eastern Bloc. In June 1971, András Sütő took him to the Budapest Book Fair in Socialist Hungary. Polish theatrologist Małgorzata Semil, who came to Romania in the early 1970s, noted Mazilu as one of the new-wave dramatists, whose "poetic, metaphorical, and allegorical plays" directly confronted the canons of socialist realism. As Semil argued, this segment of new arrivals, which also comprised Băieșu, Sorescu, Iosif Naghiu, and Ion Dezideriu Sîrbu, reconnected with the lyrical strain of interwar theater (itself represented by George Ciprian and Victor Eftimiu).

Built around Mazilu's Luceafărul diary as a set of essays, Ipocrizia disperării ("The Hypocrisy of Despair", 1972) explained his background themes, and offered insight into his tackling of existential dread. Summarized by critic Dan Culcer as "border[ing] on cynicism [and] clairvoyant humaneness", the volume was received with an ironic piece by another essayist, Alexandru George. He commented on Mazilu's apparent wish "to decapitate illusions and ideals" of the common man, but not his own: "we would ask Teodor Mazilu if he ever thought that someone else might accuse him of being a hypocrite when he refuses to be desperate." Existential themes resurfaced in Mazilu's standalone volume, Pălăria de pe noptieră ("Hat on a Nightstand"), which, as Balinte notes, is closest in intent to absurdist literature—showing a man who refuses to admit his absent-mindedness, convinced that doing so would lead to his death (as it ultimately does). Existential topics preoccupied Mazilu when writing the verse pieces in Cîntece de alchimist ("Songs of an Alchemist"), also appearing in 1972. In such philosophical poetry, he is explicitly atheistic and materialistic—but expresses a vague, veiled, hope in salvation, and recommends the art of writing as tantamount to purification. Himself a poet, Nicolae Prelipceanu opined that the works presented "are outside the sphere of poetry", with no technique to compliment the "great truths" they otherwise expressed.

Mazilu alternated such preoccupations with more conventional and lighthearted themes. In early 1970, he accompanied the Romanian national football team at World Cup Mexico, and boasted being present at Estadio Azteca for the Italy v Germany semifinal. He called it "the most miraculous football game we've ever seen", helping to convince him that the sport was not yet fully commercialized. He published all his sports columns as a single book, Fotbalul n-a fost creat de diavol ("Football Was Not Created by the Devil", 1972), and his travel writing as Este corida o luptă cu moartea? ("Are Corridas a Fight with Death Itself?", 1973). Also in 1972, Bariera was turned into a feature film, with Mureșan called in as director. The screenplay was penned by Mazilu himself, who later noted that the project was "not perfect, but not mediocre either." Critic Alice Mănoiu observed in 1979 that the filmed Bariera endured as the only war-themed production to show communist partisans (embodied here by Cotescu) using humor to overwhelm their adversaries and captors. Upon Bariera's release, Cotescu expressed hopes that he and Mazilu would finish another film project they had sketched out together, Iaurtul și restul lumii ("Yogurt and the Rest of the World").

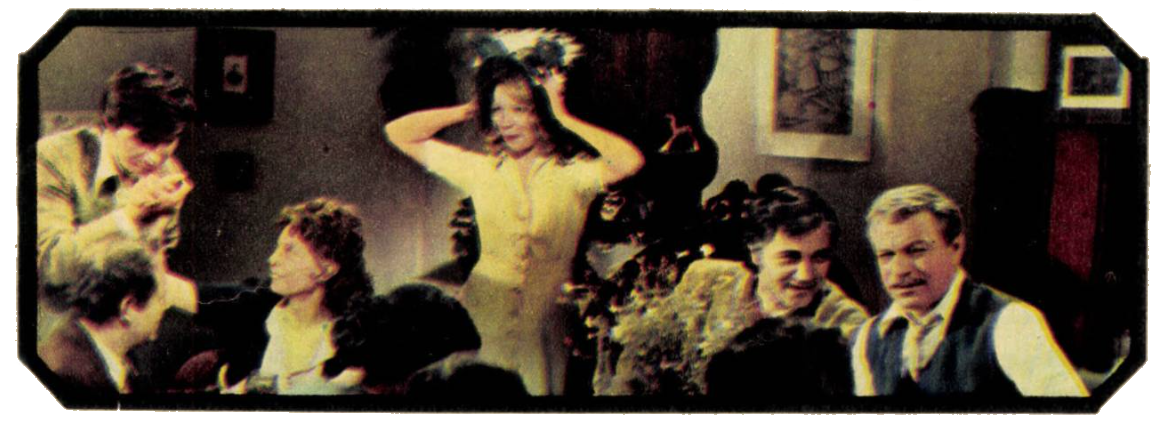
Scene from Mircea Mureșan's Bariera, with Cotescu on the right

=== 1970s zenith ===
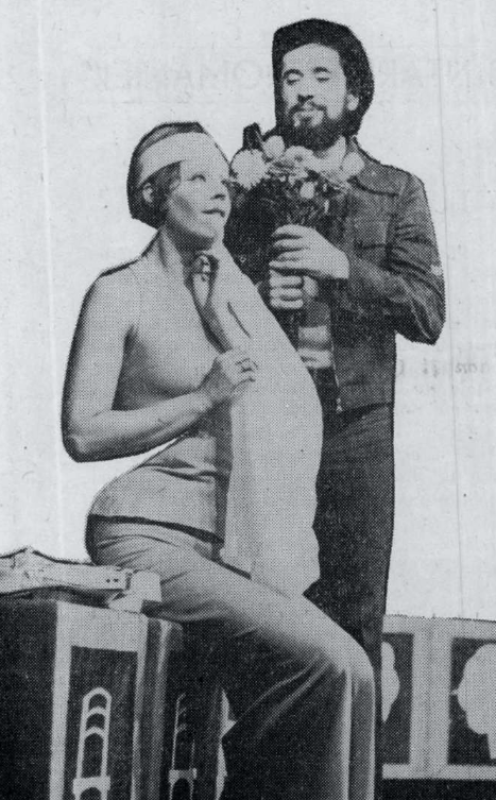
Carmen Petrescu and Mihai Cafrița in a 1978 staging of Somnoroasa aventură at Teatrul Tineretului

A 1973 selection of Mazilu's comedy-plays, Frumos e în septembrie la Veneția ("Venice Is So Nice in September"), won him the USR Prize. At the time, he had a strong association with Teatrul Tineretului of Piatra Neamț. He was brought there by actress Paula Chiuaru, with whom he began a sexual relationship—allegedly, in return for her favors, he promised to marry her, and also to write her into one of his plays. As reported by Chiuaru's colleague and friend Candid Stoica, Mazilu spent the interval drinking and writing erotic poetry about her, never rising to her expectations. The relationship ended after he was in a losing altercation with Chioaru's former lover, prompting him to leave town furtively; she believed for a while that he would return, then began angry with him after recognizing herself in the female protagonists of his newer plays.

Mazilu's prose appeared as a succession of volumes: Înmormântare pe teren accidentat ("Funeral on Rough Terrain", 1973), Iubiri contemporane ("Contemporary Loves", 1975), and Elegie la pomana porcului ("Elegy to a Sacrificed Pig", 1976). Negrici writes that all such new volumes are set on depicting the "new men" of socialism, but with "unpredictable combinations" of the human soul, meant to drop hints about the inadequacies of communist dogmas. In doing so, Mazilu acted as "a realist, striving to show, in a nuanced and correct manner, the duplication of the self and the simulacrum of normalcy in society." Balinte similarly observes that all of Mazilu's newer stories mark his definitive break with communist themes, and are more generally focused on human folly, regardless of its ideological background. They are also intentionally sadder: in one such work, an old man that is half-abandoned by his impatient family takes his revenge by tapping into their secret stash of instant coffee; other stories are studies into the wearing-down of sentimental purity through everyday routine. Seen by critics as a small masterpiece in the novella genre, Pelerinaj la ruinele unei vechi pasiuni ("Pilgrimage to the Ruins of an Old Fling") shows an archaeologist applying his method of study to his own sentimental history. Flipping the convention of romance novels, Mazilu has his protagonist discover that the actress whom he once loved had never reciprocated his feelings, being interested in him precisely because of his entertaining mediocrity.

Between the short-prose volumes of his later years, Mazilu also returned to the autobiographical novelistic genre: in 1975, he published the first and only volume of his Într-o casă străină ("In a Stranger's House"); written as a Bildungsroman, and superficially resembling communist epics, it depicts its protagonist Matei Alexandru (largely based on Mazilu himself) immersed in a universe of social climbers and psychotics. Also that year, he produced another novel, called O singură noapte eternă ("One Eternal Night"). Balinte reads its message as being about "the impossibility of love", with characters alternating between the roles of seducer and seduced. Another critic, Mircea Iorgulescu, rates it as a sample of "resistance through lovemaking" (against the restrictive norms of the Ceaușescu era), seeing it as sharing focus with novels by Virgil Duda. Alongside Într-o casă străină, O singură noapte is praised by Negrici for "the grotesque of various characters, depicted with a cruel indifference that is a staple of great art." Ștefănescu disliked it, seeing it as excessively psychological, and noting its "unexplainable lack of humor."

In 1975, Mazilu took another prize, presented by the Bucharest Writers' Association. As recalled by Raicu, during this period he was coming into money, and for the first time in his life could fulfill most of his desires. Having never had no domicile of his own, he was also granted his own one-room apartment on the outskirts of Bucharest. He nonetheless refused to live there, and was instead almost always at the USR retreat in Mogoșoaia Palace, keeping company with women and drinking late into the night. According to Silvestru, his plays were being rediscovered by provincial companies, in particular the Cluj-Napoca National Theatre (which also dedicated him a set of workshops). Writing later, Stancu revealed that such productions always stumbled into censorship, having to go through "dozens of trimmings and previews".

Mazilu had a comedic cameo in Mihai Constantinescu's 1975 drama film, Tată de duminică, providing quotes from his own works. He had a teleplay produced by the state network, appearing therein as himself; it was a staged documentary film, and showed his emotional return to his grandparents' village after a thirty-year absence. It aired in 1977 as La rude cu Teodor Mazilu ("Visiting Relatives with Teodor Mazilu"), and resulted in his being awarded an honorary diploma by the Association of Filmmakers. In 1978, director Cristian Hadji-Culea did Acești nebuni fățarnici for Iași's National Theater, winning praise for his stagecraft. Hadji-Culea took pride in noting that Mazilu appreciated the production (which the director had read through as a Chekovian lens), and that he accompanied the troupe on tour to West Germany. Mazilu wrote the satirical film Eu și restul lumii ("Me and the Rest of the World"), which was reportedly in production in 1977 (however, Bariera endures as his only completely filmed screenplay). Meanwhile, at the National Theater Bucharest (TNB), the country's main stage, Sanda Manu created a show combining Frumos e în septembrie la Veneția with similar works by Băieșu and Dumitru Solomon. In her review of the performance, Ileana Lucaciu proposed that Mazilu's text stood out from the rest, with its humor and its "modern writing".

=== Final year ===
Mazilu's conventional satire, Vin clienții! ("The Clients Are Coming!"), was aired as a television special in early 1979; its cast included Vasilica Tastaman, George Mihăiță, Ion Lucian, and Tamara Buciuceanu. The production earned praise from dramatist and TV critic Ecaterina Oproiu, who rated is as exemplary when compared to other such filmed plays. Mazilu was additionally waiting for Proștii to pass censorship ahead of a scheduled production at Piatra Neamț (negotiations here stalled, largely because the director had refused to change the play's title at the behest of cultural officials). He reportedly told Hadji-Culea that he wanted to write a new comedy, about "Romeo and Juliet under socialism". He had trouble staying in Mogoșoaia, being consumed by conflicts with his then-wife and her sister, instead seeking to reconnect with Chiuaru, who was unhappily married at Piatra Neamț. As recounted by Stoica, he was held up by his doctors' appointments in Bucharest; after this new disappointment, Chiuaru killed herself through self-immolation.

In that context, Mazilu also came out with his final play, called Mobilă și durere ("Furniture and Sorrow"). It had its world premiere, in the author's presence, at Oradea State Theater in late 1979, and was immediately after taken up for production by multiple troupes across Romania. This text is a more direct satire of market socialism, showing the managers of two competing workers' co-operatives engaged in dirty tricks against each other, all the while performing as men of integrity. At core, the play has the "geometry" of a love triangle, but this convention is only used so that the three figures involved (Sile, Paul, and Lizica) may reveal each other, and then themselves, as despicable human beings, with kitsch aspirations. Mircea Cornișteanu, who directed Mobilă și durere at Oradea, recalls that Mazilu arrived in as a noticeably ill, "thin and balding little man", "the most desperate person I had ever known." Carrying only a bag of manuscripts; he was also completely disappointed by communist norms, and felt defeated by the moral defects of his fellow men.

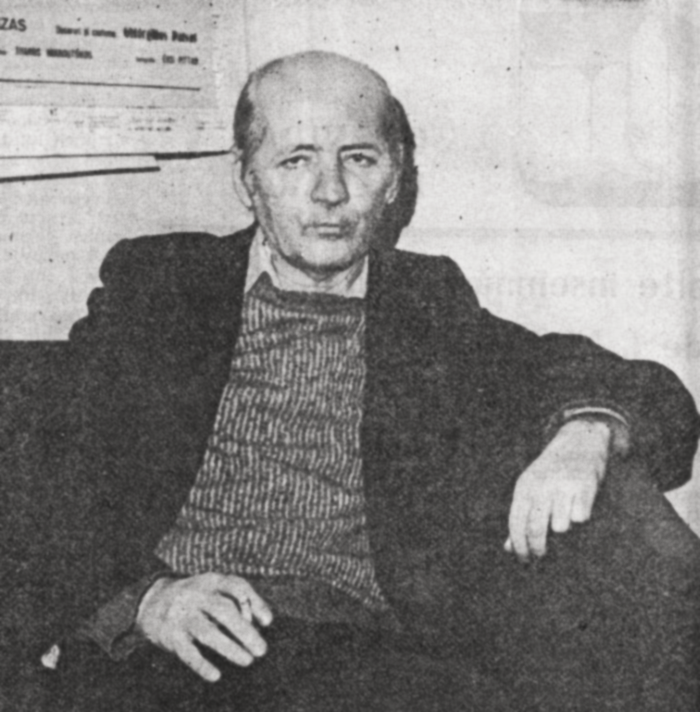
Ștefan Vilidar's 1980 photograph of Mazilu

Also in 1979, Mazilu published a volume of sketches, Doamna Voltaire ("Mrs Voltaire", 1979). It was hailed by scholar Nicolae Ciobanu as proof of his accomplishment as a writer, one who integrated casually with two opposite schools. In one instance, he stood for a "disconcerting-realist authenticity", "archetypal", "classically-oriented", fed by Caragiale and Arghezi; in the other, his was an experimental literature, with a philosophical substrate. Novelist George Arion commented on the drift between Mazilu and Băieșu: the former's new sketches presented the entire world as a "loud funfair", while Mazilu remained of "the embittered laughter". Arion added that Doamna Voltaire generally consolidated an already unique formula: "[Mazilu] discovered an unmistakable style from the beginning and continues to use it without fail, only broadening the area of investigation, while enriching his gallery of characters."

Mazilu's increasingly debilitating disease was revealed to be gastrointestinal cancer. It ended his career, just as he was preparing a definitive edition of his work for the stage, at Editura Eminescu. In July 1980, he still spoke to Familia reporter about his work on completing the second part of Într-o casă străină, after which he would be returning with a comedy. By early October, he had been permanently hospitalized at Fundeni's specialized clinic, in northeastern Bucharest. His doctor, Sandu Cociașu, was impressed by his "profoundly artistic attitude" on death, noting that he remained a bohemian to the end, with an "essential nonconformity" that never appeared inauthentic. Raicu, who visited the ward, notes that Mazilu developed a dying obsession with acquiring "a proper hat", instructing his brother to buy him one at a high-end shop in Lipscani. In justifying his choice, the writer insisted: "It's not like I'll now start feathering my nest."

Mazilu died shortly after, on 18 October. Silvestru recalled that he had agonized on a hospital bed; towards the end, he could no longer speak. Instead: "He gazed, with a sense of clarity, at the few people around him; in that moment of deliverance, two tears fell from those eyes that had stared so deep into the world's sufferings." He was buried at Străulești II Cemetery. Described by Ștefănescu as a "gigantic neighborhood of the dead", it had been set aside as part of communist-era systematization.

== Legacy ==
=== Posthumous reappraisals ===
An unsigned obituary in Familia revisited Mazilu's censoring: "Mazilu was an unfortunate fella. [...] he appeared before dogmatic, obtuse, and aggressive tribunals; his good faith was questioned in trials incited by the very population of fraudsters, fools, parasites, and morons that he so vehemently denounced in his writings." Mobilă și durere was published posthumously in 1981, and is remembered by several exegetes as Mazilu's best comedy. That year, the Oradea troupe also staged a Hungarian-language, which to took on tour to Debrecen—reportedly, it became an "outstanding success". Acești nebuni fățarnici was also being produced by the TNB in the 1982–1983 season. Also then, the Caragiale Institute, headed by Octavian Cotescu, organized a Mazilu Symposium, with his former colleagues Solomon and Radu Cosașu among the guest speakers. In tandem, Cotescu directed his students in another rendition of Acești nebuni. The same entity produced a short film based on Frumos e în septembrie la Veneția. It was shown at the 1985 festival in Tours, with prizes going to both its director, Nae Caranfil, and its female lead, Dorina Lazăr.

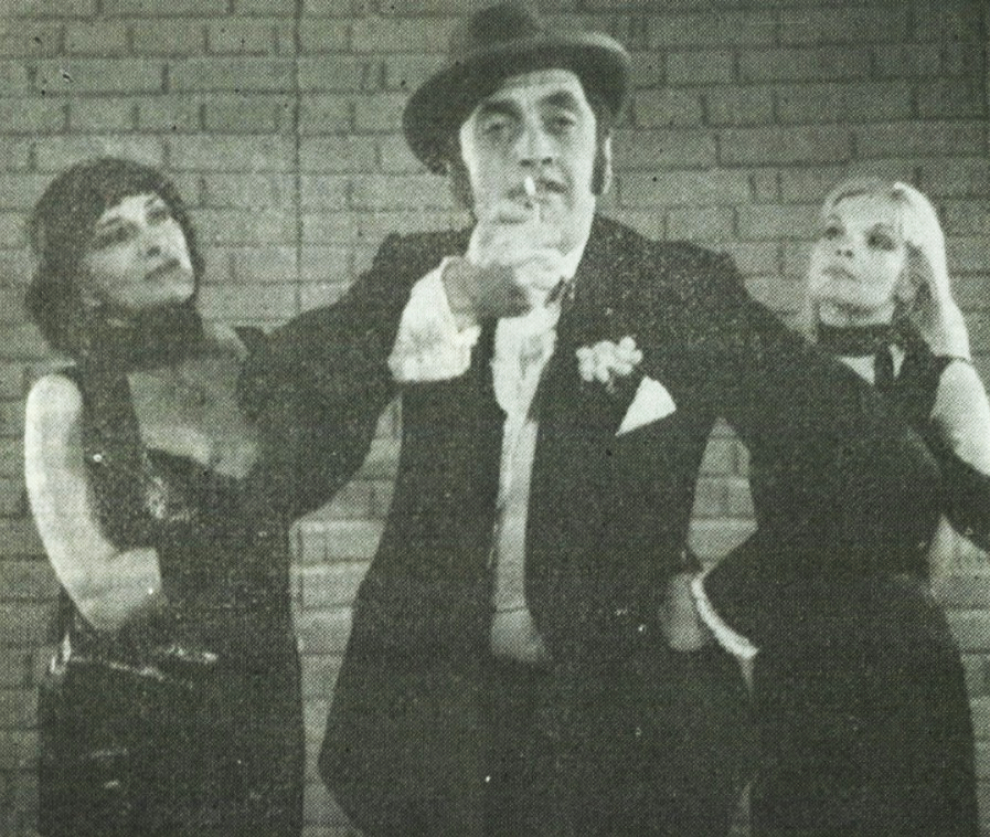
Scene from a 1985 production of Proștii sub clar de lună, with Cornel Revent as Gogu

In 1983, Raicu selected some of his deceased friend's prose for an omnibus, Soarele și ambianța ("Sun and the Ambiance"). Several other anthologies of published or unpublished stories and plays appeared over the years, beginning in 1986 with a volume centred on Acești nebuni fățarnici. Țeposu commented on its publication that: "Ever since his unwarranted and premature death, in 1980, fewer and fewer lines have been written about Teodor Mazilu. The writer must have intrigued and irritated many people along the way, but has instead been recognized as a moral and intellectual model for those who endure". At that stage, Simion concluded that some of Mazilu's work could not stand the test of time—but also that his tragicomic brand of humor was an original, and commendable, contribution, and that his journalistic style had been highly influential (if only through "generational affinities" with other columnists).

Also in 1986, journalist Ion Cristoiu initiated another debate, centred on Mazilu's debt to realism, and, beyond, his relevance to society: "[Mazilu's] irony is directed at an ironic, artificial and paradoxical world created by the author himself. He pushes the relations between his characters [...] to the point of caricature and, therefore, into the implausible." In tandem, Mobilă și durere was inspiring more daring productions—including one by Hadji-Culea, done in 1988 at the National Theater Craiova, which tested the censors' permissiveness. In mid-1989, Dem Rădulescu was directing his Caragiale Institute students in another version of that same play.

These productions were wrapped up shortly before the fall of communism, in turn followed by more radical pronouncements against Mazilu's contributions. One such was stated in 1998 by theatrologist Claudiu Groza, who opined that many of Mazilu and Băieșu's satires were just as unworthy as works by Paul Everac and Dumitru Radu Popescu. Groza believed that any anthology of communist-era theater, if centred on valuable plays, would have to be small—and mainly focus on Ion Dezideriu Sîrbu and Marin Sorescu. Authors such as Ciprian Șiulea (quoted favorably by Ștefan Ion Ghilimescu) also read Teatru as comprising works that were not just of modest value, but also compliant with the communist discourse, in that they only criticized men and women who infringed upon the regime's own views on morality. In a 2005 introduction to Mazilu, Ștefănescu included his own mixed review:

[Mazilu] goes beyond appearances without understanding that, very often, it is precisely appearances, with their diaphanous flickering, that constitute the essence of life. When confronting the human being, he lacks that respectful joy, the kind that resembles religiosity so much, the kind that turns regular writers into great writers. [...] In the field of satire—understood, as with Caragiale, as a denunciation of imposture—[Mazilu has however] attained a high level. And he has the merit of having undertaken, with talent and intelligence, this demystifying action at the very historical moment when imposture dominated public life.

=== Influence and tributes ===
Critics have detected echoes from Mazilu's brand of tragicomedy in the works of his various contemporaries, including the later works of D. R. Popescu and a theatrical scenario by Mircea Daneliuc; Mazilu's work was also continued, in a grotesque and unapologetically crass form, by Puși Dinulescu. Mazilu and Băieșu had some influence on post-communist authors—according to critic George Pruteanu, this is visible in a 1999 novel by Radu Vasile, who was at the time serving as Prime Minister of Romania, but whose text was overall illegible paraliterature. As early as 1991, the absurdist humor troupe, Divertis, was accused by Libertatea newspaper of copying some of its ideas from the late writer.

Posthumous tributes included the naming of a "Teodor Mazilu Street" in Bucharest's Rahova neighborhood, officially designated as such in late 1995. The period also witnessed various attempts to make Mazilu's work reach new audiences. As such, Dominic Dembinski's production of Proștii was taped for TVR 1 in summer 1998, with Florin Zamfirescu and Mitică Popescu among the leads. In 2001, Mazilu's poetry was released in a Romanian–French bilingual edition, with translations provided by Philippe Loubière. The launch was attended by Mazilu's daughter Ioana, with recitations provided by the veteran actor Ștefan Radof.

Writing in 2000, Cosașu declared his "mounting unease" at having to explain to his contemporaries why Mazilu's "excruciating lyricism" had remained relevant. Also then, Cosașu argued that Alexandru Boiangiu remained "one of the few directors in Bucharest who still know who Teodor Mazilu was, is, and will be." This observation did not mean that Mazilu was never taken up by post-communist theaters, but that the few reprisals of his work presented as "idiotic" readings. The same was argued in 2002 by critic Răzvana Niță, who believed that Mazilu was ignored by those who only saw him as the author of Aesopian hints, which had lost their relevancy after 1989, and instead treasured by those who believed him to be "from the realm of shenanigans", devoid of any deeper meaning. Niță only reserved praise for a "clean" production of Proștii sub clar de lună, done in 2002 by Teatrul Union (with Anca Maria Colțeanu as director, and Pavel Bartoș as Emilian).

Candid Stoica condensed and stylized his account of the Mazilu–Chiuaru relationship in a play, Dosarul curvelor ("A Dossier on Whores"); the title alluded to Chiuaru's allegations about other actresses. It was first published in early 2009, receiving a bad review in Luceafărul (which registered it as a stage version of "cheap TV entertainment"). The Strihan interviews were reissued in 2013, being welcomed by Natalia Stancu for their relevant commentary on "nihilism" and the specificity of works by Eugène Ionesco. In 2022, there was a new edition of Mazilu's essays and football journalism at Charmides of Bucharest, which also included a dialogue between Ioana Mazilu and playwright Matei Vișniec. Columnist Cristina Manole observed that Mazilu himself had by then fallen "into the shadows and oblivion of an unjust posterity." She added: "All the texts comprised in Ipocrizia disperării still hold one's attention today through the depth of their analyses and proposed themes—whether dealing with simplicity, communication, the prejudice of fantasy, habit, misanthropy, or aesthetic taste." In 2025, critic Iulia Popovici mentioned a rebirth of interest in Mazilian comedies, coming from "a new generation of directors", and also described Mazilu as a likely influence on the work of a young dramatist, Radu Horghidan.
