= Theodor Danetti =

Romanian actor

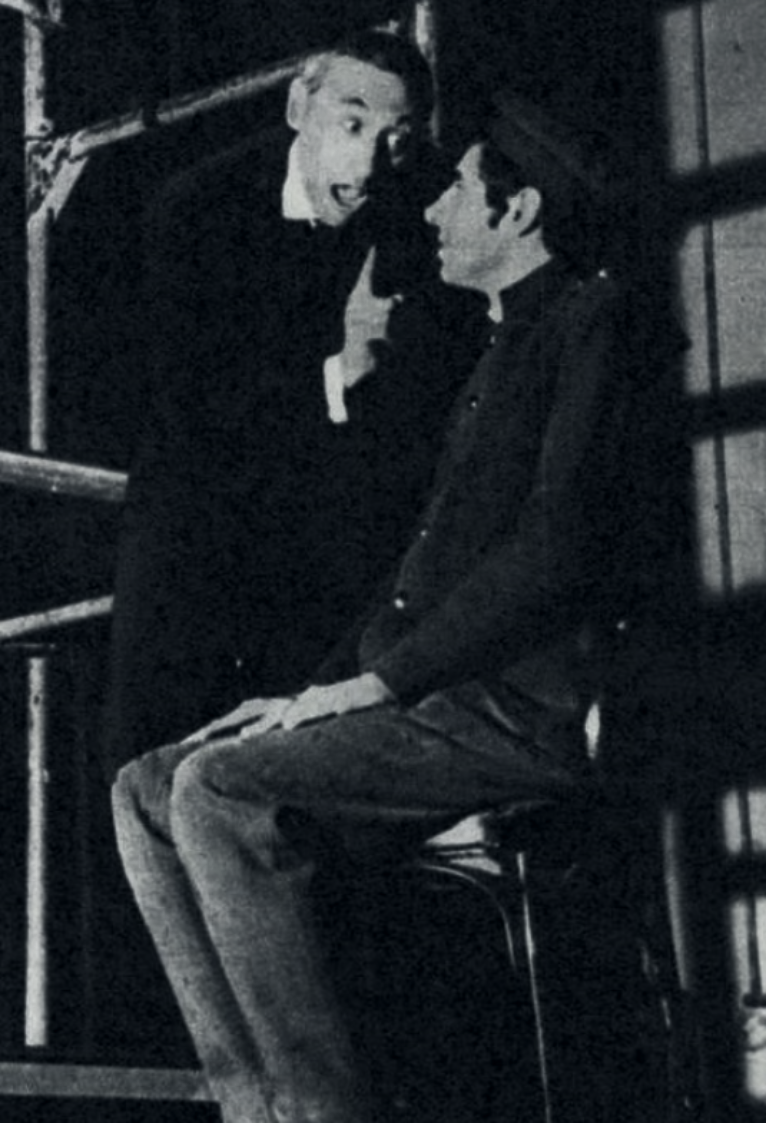
- Danetti as The Doctor, with Woyzeck (Mitică Popescu), at Teatrul Tineretului of Piatra Neamț (March 1970)
- Born: Theodor Danetti; August 23, 1926; Corabia, Romania
- Died: January 16, 2016 (aged 89); Bucharest
- Education: Caragiale Academy of Theatrical Arts and Cinematography
- Occupations: Stage actor; film actor

Theodor Danetti (Romanian pronunciation: [teˈodor daˈneti]; August 23, 1926 – January 16, 2016) was a Romanian stage and film actor.

== Life ==
Danetti was born in 1926 in Corabia. He graduated from Caragiale Academy of Theatrical Arts and Cinematography in 1955. He was distributed to the Baia Mare State Theatre, then he performed at Teatrul Tineretului of Piatra Neamț (1965–1975), State Jewish Theatre and Bulandra Theatre.

He is buried in the Bucharest Sephardic Jewish Cemetery.

== Partial filmography ==
- Bălcescu (1953)
- Vin cicliștii (1968)
- Singur printre prieteni (1979)
- Concurs (1982) - Aristide
- Moara lui Călifar (1984)
- Ciuleandra (1985)
- Cuibul de viespi (1987) - Antreprenor pompe funebre
- Figuranții (1987)
- Momentul adevărului (1989)
- Dreptatea (1989)
- Vinovatul (1991)
- Divorț... din dragoste (1991)
- È pericoloso sporgersi (1993)
- Bloodlust: Subspecies III (1994) - Innkeeper
- Crucea de piatră – ultimul bordel (1994) - Radu's father
- În fiecare zi e noapte (1995, Short) - Vecinul
- The Midas Touch (1997) - Old Man
- Little Ghost (1997) - Worker - Federov
- Johnny Mysto: Boy Wizard (1997) - Village Elder
- Train of Life (1998) - Sage 2
- The Excalibur Kid (1999) - Old Man at Court
- Teenage Space Vampires (1999) - Clerk
- Diplomatic Siege (1999) - Curator
- Shapeshifter (1999) - Janos
- Fii cu ochii pe fericire (1999)
- Elvira's Haunted Hills (2001) - The Innkeeper
- Amen. (2002) - Old Cardinal
- Maria (2003)
- Boudica (2003, TV Movie) - Master of Ceremonies
- Modigliani (2004) - Renoir
- Icon (2005, TV Movie) - Leonid Zaitsev
- The Wind in the Willows (2006, TV Movie) - Otter (uncredited)
- Youth Without Youth (2007) - dr. Neculache
- Inimă de țigan (2007) - Miguel Pajarito
- Black Sea (2008) - Nicolae - Angela's father
- The Dot Man (2008)
- Adam Resurrected (2008) - Blum
- Schimb valutar (2008)
- Hellhounds (2009, TV Movie) - Charon
- Bunraku (2010) - General
- The Dot Man (2017) - The Old Man (final film role)
