= Literary work of Tudor Arghezi =

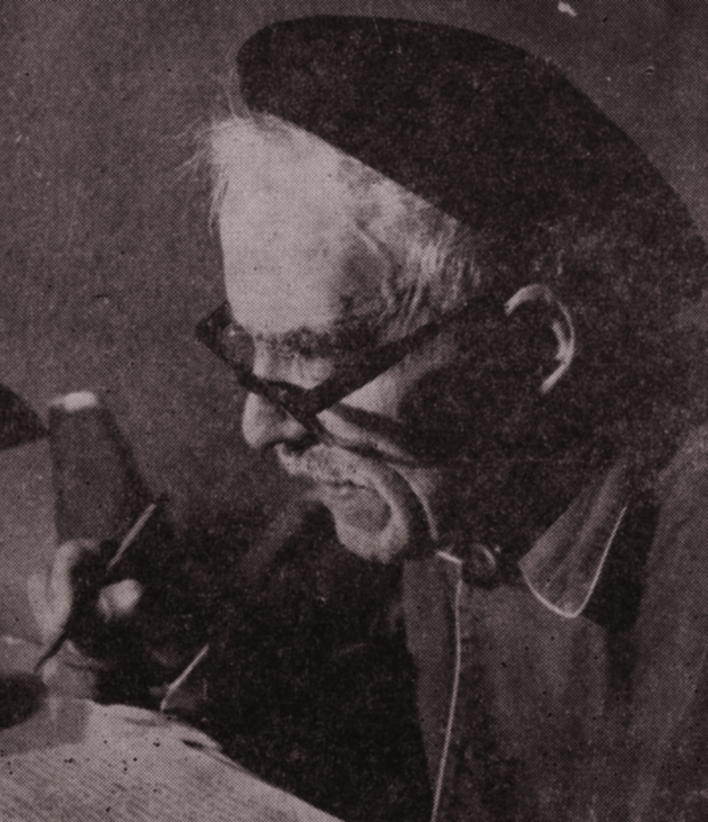
Arghezi at his writing desk, c. 1960

Tudor Arghezi was a Romanian writer, social critic and political figure, who is widely considered one of his country's greatest poets. His writing career covered nearly 70 years, from his teenaged debut in the 1890s to his death in 1967. He was originally an affiliate of the Symbolist movement, being welcomed there as an outstanding poet. Though he discarded this association in favor of a more personal style, he remained spiritually attached to the masters of international Symbolism, including Charles Baudelaire. From 1910, Arghezi's social poetry and leftist journalism became widely read, allowing him to embark on a writing career. He only published his poetry as books when he was in his forties, becoming instantly famous. In his creation of new poetic forms, he also borrowed the conventions of Christian poetry to contextualize his own embrace of agnosticism and delving into heresy.

Well-liked for his bridging of modernist techniques and thematic traditionalism, Arghezi was also praised for his verbal inventiveness, within the confines of a classical prosody. He took pride in upgrading the lower-class register of speech, and also extensively used the Oltenian dialect, with which he identified culturally. He became reviled by some of his generation colleagues, especially those represented in conservative circles, for the extreme naturalism and grotesque expressionism found in his subsequent works. Arghezi was instead regarded as an ally by the interwar avant-garde, which he encouraged without ever joining. His poetry won over portions of the cultural establishment during the 1930s, and always had admirers among dissenting traditionalists; he was therefore recognized as a Romanian classic even during the late interwar and World War II. The period saw Arghezi branching out into new creative fields, evidencing his satisfaction with life as a family man, as with his noted contributions to children's literature. He is less celebrated as a novelist, since his work there was less rigorous, often creating prose poetry rather than full-fledged epics; in addition, his one work for the stage, which reflects his personal resentment of the medical profession, has divided critics.

In his sixties, Arghezi was marginalized by the fledgling communist regime, who found him incompatible with its own political and aesthetic guidelines. Banned by the official censors between 1947 and 1954, he wrote dissident poetry that he did not publish, and that he sometimes destroyed. His subsequent recovery saw him climbing into the communist literary pantheon; while he preserved his stylistic traits (only embracing socialist realism and full-on propaganda in his travel writing), his publicized contributions of that period are largely viewed as of comparatively inferior quality. He still maintained a large following among young authors, who found themselves inspired by his more consecrated works of earlier periods. He also continued to inspire new generations of writers after his death.

== Poetry ==
=== Stylistic origins ===
Ion Nae Theodorescu, later known as Tudor Arghezi, wrote his first poems in 1894, when he was aged fourteen and enrolled at Cantemir School. As he later explained, he had only taken up this hobby on a dare, to compete with a more literary-inclined colleague. He was pushed to read literature by two of his teachers, but was also interested in bohemianism, believing that such lifestyles came natural for professional journalists. A year later, he had become an outside affiliate of the socialist movement, sending samples of poetry for publication in socialist newspapers, but possibly without yet sharing the political agenda: according to historian Andi Mihalache, Arghezi was mainly interested in networking with left-wing literary professionals, including Garabet Ibrăileanu. His penetration into literary life was a shock, with Ibrăileanu puzzled as to whether his poems evidenced genius or merely insanity.

While being hailed as an outstanding talent even at that age, Arghezi viewed himself as an artisan of a laborious and torturous craft: from his time as a monk of the Romanian Orthodox Church (1900–1905), he gathered the metaphor of the narrow gate, and had imposed "strict canons" on his artistic output. During his 1900s dispute with the more senior journalist George Panu, he defended classical and Parnassian constrains such as meter, and complained that prose had been allowed to invade poetry. He once declared that the exercise of filling out empty sheets of papers left him feeling like a modern-day Job; the goal was a poetic religion, constructing what he called "iconostases of words". In a 1928 article, Arghezi referred his poetic vocabulary as a "heated gurgling from beneath the mud that enslaves me". Almost two decades later, he was asking his peers to pity him for his labor "on this estate of mine, where rarely do I get to dig into a stream of silver." As scholar Eugen Simion notes, Arghezi resembled Paul Valéry in his quest for perfection, but, unlike Valéry's cerebral purism, his poetry had "the brutal colors of reality". In the 1920s, Mihai Ralea was the first critic to note that Arghezi could not contain his rage, that he had a "functional inability" when it came to producing calm and uninvolved rhetoric. Similarly, Arghezian disciple Ion Caraion discusses Arghezi as a poet of "disquiet" rather than equilibrium, as located in his confession:

Ispitele ușoare și blajine
N-au fost și nu sunt pentru mine.

Translation:

Temptations of a soft docility
Have never been, and never will be, meant for me.

At Bilete de Papagal magazine, where he got closest to theorizing a poetic credo in the 1930s, Arghezi preached complete sincerity, advising his followers to distrust fame, convention, and especially formalism. Scholar Nicolae Balotă regards his lyrical theorizing as revolving around the idea of a "fruit", of germination and fecundity within the writing process, as well as in the preferred imagery. Another fundamental myth of his poetry, aligning with his own self-presentation, was his belief in the "proud solitude" of a poet, with "an impressive number of metaphors" created for bringing this issue into focus—with fainter echoes of his "abysmal fear" in front of life's essences. Overall, the defrocked Arghezi identified as an agnostic; while stating his respect for authentic religiosity, he declarted his inability to take up Christian dogmas, or belief in general. In his implicit or explicit polemics with the Orthodox Church, he observed that atheism and dialectical materialism were preferable to the debased "idolatry" of average Christians, and seems to have expressed sympathy for heresies such as Arianism or Bogomilism.

Arghezi's struggles with belief show up in a number of lyrical pieces that (various authors note) resemble Christian poetry without ever fully merging into it, since they describe God the Father as a frustratingly self-concealing deity; Duhovnicească ("Spiritual Confession") and various "Psalms" are widely hailed as masterpieces of this series, which also seeps into the cycle Flori de mucigai ("Mildew Flowers"), published in 1931. One such work reads:

Păcatul meu adevărat
E mult mai greu și neiertat.
Cercasem eu, cu arcul meu,
Să te răstorn pe tine, Dumnezeu!
Tâlhar de ceruri, îmi făcui solia
Să-ți jefuiesc cu vulturii tăria.
Dar eu râvnind în taină la bunurile toate,
Ți-am auzit cuvântul zicând că nu se poate.

Translation:

Such was my veritable sin,
One dark and hard and left within:
I went about, with bow in arm,
To find thee, God, and do thee harm!
A knave in heaven, I had almost raided
With all my hawks, thine house—degraded.
And secretly elated (it was all for me),
I heard thee sternly speaking: that can't be!

Caraion observes however that Arghezi's "belief in poetry" was limited and circumstantial, since he regarded the craft itself as fundamentally mendacious, despite a poet's best intentions: "if poetry torments [Arghezi], it does so with no relief, and no cure". Balotă further notes "his refusal to confess, and therefore to find a source for lyricism in a poet's subjectivity". In Caraion's reading, Arghezi's search for linguistic totality often meant playing with "facile" metaphors, with forms of "candor" and "trickery", through which he persuaded some of his readers that he too could be superficial and "ornamental". Meanwhile, his recurring attraction to the minute universe—that of small, humble creatures subject to a "progressive de-materialization"—drew comparisons Reiner Maria Rilke and his Duino Elegies. These generic traits led him to be shunned by hermetic poets such as Ion Barbu, who dismissed him as base, and Simion Stolnicu, who viewed him as "nebulous".

Many readers have commented on Arghezi's seemingly unlimited poetic resources, and his eluding all definitions by embracing in turn all the manifestations of modernism, and remaining original, with the same core traits, throughout. Scholar Miklós Szabolcsi rated him as a final exponent of the local Symbolist school, "reconsidered [by Arghezi] in a national optic." His stylistic education, shaped by the contrasting influences of Mihai Eminescu and Alexandru Macedonski, was also directly based on Symbolism as an international phenomenon; at sixteen, he was borrowing from René Ghil, but also pushing in the first elements of his creative universe. In the 1910s, while under employment with Seara daily, where (as Rotaru writes) he abandoned his "fatefully Macedonskian" side, he openly derided Romanian Symbolists, but not the Western masters. He was thereafter a posthumous disciple of Charles Baudelaire, particularly when it came to Baudelaire's "flowers of evil". A brief, fully expressionist phase was also identifiable just before 1916—with expressionistic undertones, on a trajectory somewhat similar to Gottfried Benn's, still appearing over a decade later. Literary critic Șerban Cioculescu writes that Arghezi's "poetry of disgust" hinged on his distressing experiences from all ranges of life—his time at Cernica Monastery, his detainment alongside the "fauna of prison" at Văcărești, and his time with the literary clubs. His lampoons grew into a poetic style:

Nobody found richer ways of expression when it came to translating into words a material decomposition, a purulence, an abscess, an exfoliating dermatitis, done with such satanic glee as if a passionate clinician discussing "beautiful" chancres or tumors, fantastically rubescent, as in underwater flora and fauna.

=== Quasi-traditionalism ===
Arghezi found common ground with the interwar's traditionalist and nationalist movement (and, beyond it, the Sămănătorist current) only by searching authenticity. Cioculescu describes this transition as unusual, in that Arghezi was first an outstandingly radical, "cosmopolitan" poet, and only later discovered his "national fiber"; this transformation, or discarding of "foreign idols", was mirrored by his village-themed and peasant-focused political poetry, beginning with the 1910s piece Belșug ("Wealth"). Honoring the silent labor of a plowman, it became a favorite of the agrarian conservatives. The national element, along with other staples of Arghezi's "materialized" poetry, shows up throughout Arghezi's breakthrough cycle Cuvinte potrivite ("Suited Words", 1926), and its widely quoted subsection, "Testament"; it stands out for identifying Arghezi's own poetic techniques, his reverence for the "obscure branch" of Romanian society, and his intended recipients ("The Master" and the "lazy Damsel", who are supposed to be riled up by what they read). The core lines are read by critics as both an artistic credo and a meditation on the immense, unsung, efforts of anonymous ancestors:

Ca să schimbăm, acum, întâia oară,
Sapa-n condei și brazda-n călimară,
Bătrânii-au adunat, printre plăvani,
Sudoarea muncii sutelor de ani.
Din graiul lor cu-ndemnuri pentru vite
Eu am ivit cuvinte potrivite[.]

Translation:

So that we may discard our clod-and-spade,
And move up to the ink-and-paper trade,
Our elders have endured, among their tarnished cattle,
Ages and ages of a sweaty battle.
Out of their language, meant for steering herds,
I spawned my own array of suited words[.]

Leaning into Romanian folklore (which was still "virtually absent" in his debut cycle, Agate negre, or "Black Diamonds"), Arghezi also cultivated a phonology that either was, or seemed to be, heavily based on the Oltenian dialect—though often infused with jarring neologisms of diverse provenance. Scholar Gabriel Țepelea observes that international audience he acquired at that stage found him similar to Federico García Lorca, in their "folk-inspired freshness". In this creative category, he revived the curse-poem, taking it into naturalistic depths:

Iar ție, jivină gingaș gânditoare,
Să-ți fie șezutul cuprins de zăvoaie.
Ficatul un cui să-ți frământe
Urechea să țipe și nasul să-ți cânte.
Să-ți crape măselele-n gură
Și dinții cu detunătură.
Să-ți pută sărutul, oftatul să-ți pută,
Mormânt cu mocirla stătută.

Translation:

And you, my soft-headed preacher:
May your nose wheeze like some creature.
May your backside burst a long stream,
May your liver sting, as your ears scream.
May your molars break off in mid-chew,
Just as your front-teeth unscrew.
May your kiss reek of dead slush,
May that smell come out when you gush.

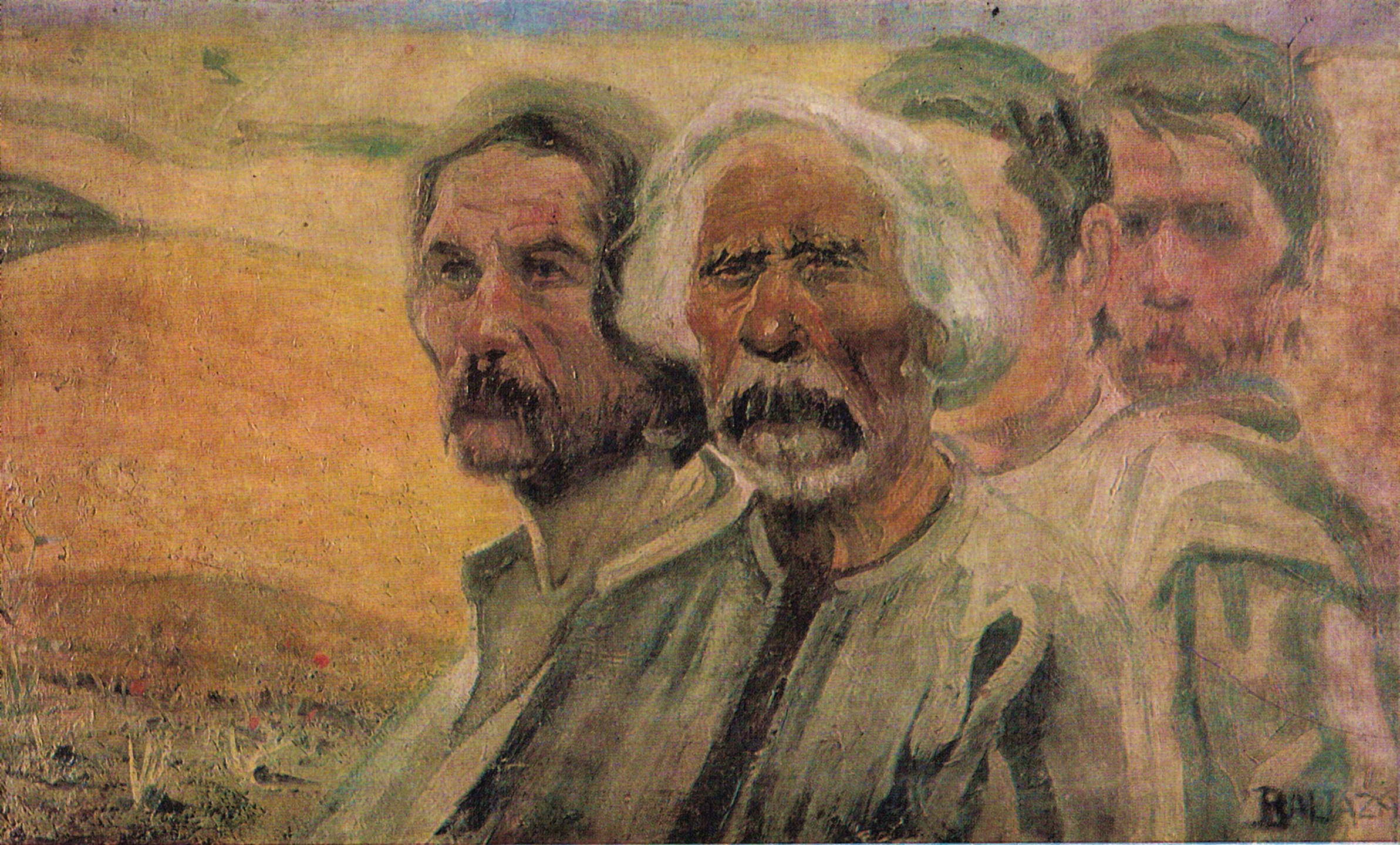
Peasants, by Arghezi's friend Apcar Baltazar

The generic aspects of this synthesis came to be reviled by the traditionalist writers and critics. One of these was Nicolae Iorga, who engaged in a decades-long polemic with Arghezi; he described Cuvinte potrivite as "comprising all of what is most repulsive in concept and most trivial in shape". Similarly, Arghezi's flirtations with the avant-garde magazine were rejected by traditionalists who had been welcoming of his earlier work, including those at Gândirea magazine. In 1930, the latter's publisher, Nichifor Crainic, reminded Romanians of Arghezi's "desertion to the enemy" during World War I, suggesting that his moral sickness was directed against "anything that's holy". Later that decade, Crainic's associate Vintilă Horia described Arghezi as corrupted by his Jewish associates. Such rejection came even as the poet was renouncing his earlier leftism. His articles and poems paid homage to the authoritarian King of Romania, Carol II, possibly even before the latter could begin his reign in 1930; he also joined the right-leaning Georgist Liberal Party, and was a close friend of the antisemitic nationalist Octavian Goga. Controversy still endures as to whether Arghezi ever supported the fascist Iron Guard.

While politically unstable, Arghezi was consistent in provoking conservatives with his selective nods to the avant-garde, cultivating its "new poetry" without ever explicitly adhering to its tenets. He once explained to his enemy Iorga that he regarded himself as an old woman, whose garden was filled with all kinds of flowers, all of them feeding on the same dung. As Balotă observes, "[Arghezi] refuses both the dissolving of continuity (the avant-garde solutions), as well as its sanctification (the traditionalist solutions)." Cioculescu invokes a similar distinction:

Arghezian metaphors, running contemporary to the delirious imagism of the extreme modernists, are sometimes lined up as their own series; nevertheless, they bear the classical seal of an artist who will ascribe a moral experience and a clear meaning to each individual metaphor.

Against Arghezi's traditionalist admirers, critic Ovidiu Papadima warns that doine and other folkloric standards, while passing into his poems, should never be regarded as decisive. The "essentially urban" poet only used folkloric motifs in a transfigured manner, and only followed the traditional trochaic rhythm in "popular" verse, designed to reach his least educated readers. According to literary scholar Eugen Negrici, Arghezi is largely a modernist, but, like all Romanian modernists, is fundamentally more conservative than its Western models, being entirely devoid of anti-artistic sentiment. Simion summarized the contextual strangeness of his case:

Is Arghezi a modernist poet? Well yes, but... Is he a chthonic poet? Well of course, but... Does he have links with Symbolism? He does, given that he is the author of Agate negre and Flori de mucigai, but... What of his rapports with the avant-garde movement? They're good, given that [avant-garde] anthologies sample his work, but you see... But you see, Arghezi is and isn't wherever we transpose him, he is everywhere and nowhere in particular, like the Holy Ghost, beloved, disputed, understood, misunderstood, turned into a classic by our schools, rejected by those who have no taste in poetry, described as either a difficult poet or [...] one who's clear, too clear, who is at a loss of ideas.

=== "New small universes" ===
As Cioculescu notes, after "the monument of our lyricism" that is Cuvinte potrivite, Arghezi worked in steps, with each new volume "annexing a new small universe to his lyrical horizons." In Flori de mucigai, he transfigures his own experiences as an inmate of Văcărești Prison (1918–1919), in a style that evoked Goya's Caprichos. Some portions of this cycle, which are more narrative, descend into the surrounding mahala and bohemian Bucharest. They contain depictions of prostitution and sexual violence, alongside explorations of Romanian profanity. Part of the focus is explicitly on the Romanies (Gypsies). As summarized by literary historian Angelo Mitchievici, "[Arghezi's] Gypsy women breathe out the poisoned sensuality of flowers growing out of landfills, stirring up one's blood and moving shining knives out of their sheaths." Widely seen as the most relevant poem in Flori de mucigai, "Ion Ion" shows an outlaw's body as it decomposes in "tragic greatness", with an overall "mix of sublime and abjection". Its core stanzas read:

Departe de vatră și prins de boieri,
Departe de jalea mămuchii,
Pe trupu-i cu pete și peri,
În cârduri sunt morți și păduchii.

Translation:

Far from his village, entrapped by The Man,
Far from his mommy's faint cries,
Ion expires with his spots and his hairs;
He dries up, and so do his lice.

In steep contrast, Hore (the plural of hora), published in 1939, is viewed by Cioculescu as a product of "[Arghezi's] enormous joy, benignly humiliating his adversaries", and as the first Arghezian experiment with the staples of children's songs. Some of the satire was specifically about Iorga, depicted therein as Moș Pârțag ("Old Man Pique"). Cărticică de seară ("Evening Booklet", 1935), rated by Cioculescu as an "endless epithalamium", "of no programmatic character", honors the family life he had built with his second wife, Paraschiva. In such works, Arghezi borders on erotic literature, but, according to critic Ion Trancău, expresses himself with "candor, discretion, and prudery." The Cărticică series was, in Simion's words, the most microcosmic and "Franciscan" of all his lyrical output. It features a inspection of vegetating life, with hints of Arghezi's enduring "divine problem":

Îmbrăcați în straie de iască
Sunt gata cartofii să nască.
S-au pregătit o iarnă, de soroc,
Cu cârtițele la un loc,
Cu întunericul, cu coropijnița și râmele,
Și din toate fărâmele
Au rămas grei ca mâțele,
Umflându-li-se țâțele.
Auzi?
Cartofii sunt lehuzi.
Ascultă, harul a trecut prin ei
Virginal, candid și holtei,
Dumnezeiește
Cel-de-Sus și din veac binevoiește
Să-și coboare sfintele scule
Până la tubercule.

Translation:

All made up in fungal dress
Taters are pregnant, taters press.
In fall and winter snoozing, up to term,
With mouldwarp, cricket, also worm,
They're waiting on a chance to break on through,
And down there, in that dark, assorted goo,
Their tits hang down with heavy fats—
As if the tits on knocked-up cats.
You hear?
The mothering is getting near.
Listen how grace envelops taters,
The grace of celibate and clumsy fraters,
In that godly, settled way
Of a Lord that's here day by day,
Who now brings His tools down to spur
A growth in His subject, the tuber.

Arghezi was initially repressed by the Romanian communist regime, which favored socialist realist aesthetics; immediately after the regime had been established in 1947, official critic Traian Șelmaru became the first author to describe Arghezi as a politically useless "decadent". This attack was expanded upon by Scînteia editor Sorin Toma, who published an infamous article describing Arghezi as not just decadent, but also as the "pathogenic agent" of an "agonizing class". In Toma's reading, Arghezi's poetic ideas seemed to be "fabricated in the loony bin." As reported by his son Baruțu T. Arghezi, Tudor continued to write anti-communist texts, but burned all of them in his chimney at Mărțișor. Baruțu was able to rescue some of these texts, by stealing them from his father and burying them at the root of a tree. He republished them in a 2010 series, called Anii tăcerii ("Years of Silence"). One such piece satirizes an unnamed "boss" of the communized country, who builds himself a monument that reflects his entire career; the last line was selected by Baruțu from several variants on the same page:

Și-ar fi făcut statuia întreagă strânsă-n frac
Scoțând, ca la tribună, un braț întins și-un crac
Pe lături cu simboluri, Dreptatea, Libertatea
Patriotismul, Brazda, Religia, Cetatea,
Închipuite-n fete pe jumătate goale,
Jur împrejur cu plante și cinci sau șase oale.
De monumentul ăsta cu trepte și-o privată
Se îngrijește țara de-a pururi întristată.
Când desvelit o dată se-arată ca o schiță
Model de scuipătoare, și pușculiță.

Translation:

Here would've been his statue, enveloped in a frock,
With ample gestures speaking, extending arm and hock,
Surrounded by great symbols: good Justice, Liberty,
Patriotism, Furrow, Faith and Democracy,
Imagined as if maidens, revealing, in the buff,
Alongside five–six basins, and plants—and other stuff.
This monument, erected with stairs to a latrine,
Is meant to be curated by all those mourning him.
Should we unveil his artwork, we'll find its other boons:
A template for our treasures, and, when in doubt, spittoons.

=== Communist works ===
Communist hardliners were pushed back in the early 1950s. Marking Arghezi's return from imposed silence, the poetry volume Prisaca was a quasi-inventory of his home, with its insects and pets. It remains especially famous and quoted for Zdreanță ("Rags"), eulogizing his mongrel dog. Rehabilitation came with a swift change of style and perspective, as prompted by Arghezi's political handlers—the resulting works are seen by Simion as "unequal", but never shameful. As noted by academic Florin Mihăilescu, the post-rehabilitation period initially came with "well-deserved eulogies", but these quickly degenerated into a cult of personality that matched one surrounding communist leader Gheorghe Gheorghiu-Dej.

The 1950s philosophical poem Cîntare omului ("Song to Man") was commissioned and published by Crohmălniceanu, allowing for Arghezi's full reconsideration. This work expands on a vision of the homo faber; here, Arghezi sets out to free mankind from what Cioculescu defines as "the old mystical-religious terrors", graduating it into the age of scientific progress and space exploration. Cîntare won immediate praise from the official critic Tudor Vianu—but, Negrici argues, was "dim" and "thesist", lacking all characteristics that had made Arghezi into a great poet. Baruțu additionally reported that his father had abandoned an anti-communist and depressed writing, Neomul ("The Non-human"), for the "real-positive" Cîntare. However, literary critic Răzvan Voncu argues that it and all other such lyrical contributions are not stylistically tied to socialist realism, which only shows in some of Arghezi's late-stage journalistic prose.

Th poetic cycle 1907, which the regime commissioned as a commemorative piece for the peasants' revolt of 50 years prior, is described by Arghezi's partisans as a salvageable lesson in social poetry, with hints of Victor Hugo. Rotaru notes that the series is also the first one to describe peasants as "monumental", with imagery borrowed from the Bible, whereas the upper class is vilified as criminal and unbearably grotesque by nature. He also argues that any such work carries the burden of "lyrical objectivity" and didacticism, both of which are also present in nationalist poems by Octavian Goga. One piece of this cycle is named after its protagonist, "Pătru al Catrincăi", who appears in chains before his captors. Transfigured by his revolutionary heroism, Pătru resembles the Orthodox saints and hierarchs:

Patru diaconi falnici, înalți și lați în spete,
Drept sfeșnice de mână, cu puști și baionete,
Păzeau arhiereul din temniță, de-aproape,
Să nu cumva să zboare și să scape.
Era, cum zic, un munte de om, și-ntre vecini,
Ca un vultur pe piscuri, târât printre găini.

Translation:

Four deacons—tall and big and strong,
With bayonet and rifle, like candles stood along
This hierarch of the lock-up—a huddle, and so tight,
A strong and cautious grip on his unlikely flight.
He was, how should I put it, a mountain of a man,
An eagle from the summits, pecked down by beaks of hen.

Political themes are also embraced in Stihuri pestrițe ("Motley Versets", 1957). These had the format of classical fables, and possibly showed Arghezi's newfound familiarity with Ivan Krylov's work; one fragment depicts the folk hero Păcală mocking the Romanian diaspora and its anti-communism, while others have Arghezi personally censuring the deposed Romanian royal family. Trancău proposes that the superficial conformity of such contributions masks a layer of anti-communist intertextuality. This dissidence is more fully attested in other old-age works by the embittered poet. His sarcasm turned against his faded communist critics, for instance in his final put-down of his rival Alexandru Toma (Sorin Toma's father), reading:

Ce-i fi și tu și ce fel de jivină,
Că scormonești și tu-n lumină?
Încerci să zbori și ajungi să sai
Ca gărgărița de mălai.

Translation:

What sort of beast, what kind of bug are you,
To pester me, to steal my light, my view?
Here's you, all ready to be soaring high,
Only to sink back into porridge—like some fly.

== Prose ==
=== Novels ===
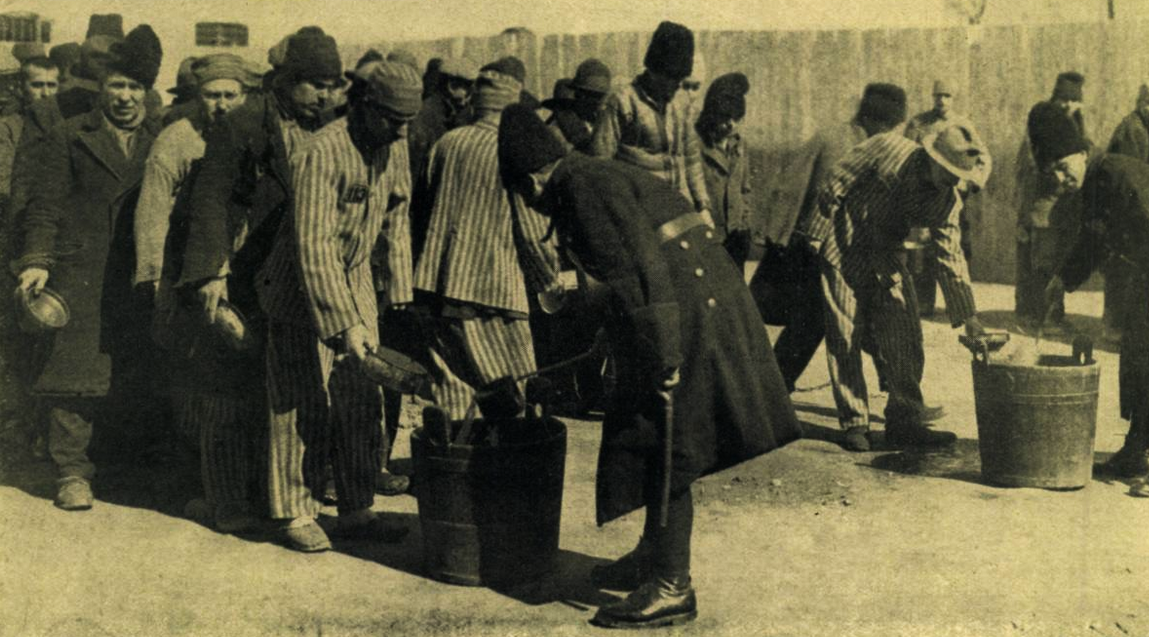
Lunch being served at Văcărești Prison in 1935

In 1966, while reminding readers that Arghezi's first fame was as a political satirist, Cioculescu added: "no researcher in the field of literature has yet studied [...] the squandering of talent and ideas by Arghezi the journalist." His overall prose was widely though of as inimitable, combining "an inexhaustible reservoir of words" and an "immense capacity for [personal] impressions, sensations, feelings, and thoughts." Arghezi's editor, Ovid S. Crohmălniceanu, once reflected on his takeover of Romanian grammar—with uniquely Arghezian phrases that were rearranged counterintuitively, yet coherently. Simion proposes that, while the targets and goals of his satire are now entirely obscure, his "fantastic drawings", echoing Jonathan Swift, continue to entice the imagination. Beyond his contextual originality, the raconteur and polemicist was an avowed student of French literature. He was occasionally likened to Louis-Ferdinand Céline, but was more often seen as Romania's own Léon Bloy. Cioculescu also invokes parallels in politically diverse environments of that era, from Léon Daudet to the anarchists at L'Assiette au Beurre. A deeper model was François Rabelais, whose vast work he always wished, but never managed, to translate into Romanian.

Fore all his generic talent in prose, Arghezi is often described as a failed novelist, who had little patience for the epic genre and too often slipped back into either his usual imprecations or his intense lyricism. Icoane pe lemn ("Icons on Wood"), published in 1929 as the first such contribution, is written in his self-titled "tabloid" style—that combines virulent lampoon and dispassionate description of outrageous facts of life. It pokes fun at the moral failings of seemingly imbecilic monks (including fornication and masturbation), as well as documenting, in grotesque detail, their indifference to hygiene. An entire portion of the book claims to instruct readers on how to prepare new relics by cutting off portions of existing ones, and provokes pious readers by veering into the language of cookbooks.

Poarta neagră ("The Black Gate") of 1930 is in large part a disguised memoir of Văcărești, and in some ways a prose variant of Flori de mucigai. It includes graphic detail about his fellow inmates: an effeminate poet who never washes; another one who, as a socialist and a "monument in stupidity", proclaims that theaters should be banned; a Romani musician of exquisite talent and beauty, who prostitutes himself; and a peasant who dies while on hunger strike. Rotaru sees the book as unbearable is its "abjection", arguing that Arghezi had surpassed naturalistic predecessors, and contemporaries such as Mateiu Caragiale, in minutely covering "a fetid area that is more than infernal." Appearing in 1933, Tablete din Țara de Kuty ("Tabloids from the Land of Kuty"), and visibly influenced by contacts with Urmuz's avant-garde prose, was described by the author himself as a "cudgel" (toroipan)—usable on all his adversaries, Iorga included. It pushes through the "filthy intimacy" of devilish creatures such the caretaker of a bishopric (depicted as "one step removed" from a parasitic worm) and the morbidly obese leader of Romanian feminism.

Baruțu suggests that Ochii Maicii Domnului ("Eyes of the Theotokos"), penned in 1934, is "not a novel in the classic sense, [but] a beautiful life story", with faint elements of its author's life between Chitila and Geneva. It is also largely a "mystical" depiction of motherly love—and a prose counterpart to his rhymes in Vraciul, with digressions that, Simion notes, "evidence Arghezi's verbal genius". The same critic sees 1936's Cimitirul Buna-Vestire ("Annunciation Cemetery") as a political novel, or as a fresco of corruption and moral degradation in Greater Romania, but one written in quasi-independent "tabloids" that can be regarded as individual masterpieces, and that are "always inspired". Its style, Crohmălniceanu notes, pours the grotesque touches of expressionism and a monk's readings from the Church Fathers into an "inventory of abjection" and a "vision of universal damnation". The overall text is read by Cioculescu as an anti-capitalist but skeptical fable, in which the dead rise up from their graves as a stand-in for the revolutionary classes, pestering and terrorizing the "unworthy masters" of the living realm. The rising of the dead provokes complicated police procedures, since non-dead impostors steal the identities of illustrious revenants (from Eminescu to Matei Basarab). Several reviewers have noted that the core narrative pokes fun at the adventures and preaching of an interwar mystic, Petrache Lupu.

Lina of 1942 is Arghezi's sole autobiographical novel, wherein he appears as Ion Trestie, working at a sugar mill that resembles Chitila's (where Arghezi was a lab assistant in the 1890s); in addition to such rare insight into his life, the book encapsulates a political manifesto, described by Cioculescu as targeting "foreign capital", bringing in the "unregulated human fabric" of monstrous foreigners. These are identifiable as Jews and Hungarians, exercising arbitrary power over the mass of Romanians and Slovaks. Trestie, seen by critic Octav Șuluțiu as embodying "the Romanian's capacity for work", pulls through, ultimately replacing the Jew Azner as a factory manager. Ion and Lina's love affair is also meant to highlight the "moral and physical purity" of Romanians, but, as Șuluțiu notes, the narrative never becomes "didactic" in tone; it stands, overall, as "Arghezi's best book of prose", only matched in this by Cimitirul.

=== Other prose works ===
Other prose experiments were interspersed among Arghezi's novels. Cartea cu jucării ("Book of Toys"), published in 1931, combines affectionate accounts of domestic life (with children Baruțu and Mitzura as protagonists), didactic fragments, and various fairy-tales created for the writer's own enjoyment. The mix was lauded by critic Pompiliu Constantinescu as a wondrous extension of Arghezi's literary universe, and by scholar Gheorghe Achiței as a disguised "textbook of aesthetic education". Both Achiței and Arghezi's friend Constantin Beldie note that it was also somewhat hypocritical, since its only possible readers were nostalgic grown-ups. The lyrical notations in Ce-ai cu mine, vântule? ("Wind, Why Do You Trouble Me?", 1937) add precise, naturalistic, elements to a consecrated genre, for instance in describing the burial of a sexless, winged archangel by a group of pious and bewildered fishermen.

During the late stages of World War II, Arghezi's patriotic feelings were exhibited by his political prose, which was increasingly at odds with Nazi Germany and its state ideology—at the time, Romania was under Ion Antonescu, who had aligned himself with the Nazi regime. As a regular at Informația Zilei newspaper, he tested the limits of Antonescian censorship—a piece called Voinicul ("Big Fella") resulted in his detainment for a 24-hour period. Arghezi once acknowledged that the text was subversive, though he rejected claims that it was an homage to the Jewish community leader, Wilhelm Filderman. In September 1943, the same paper carried his piece Baroane ("Thou Baron"), which remained famous as a thinly-veiled attack the German ambassador, Manfred von Killinger, described therein as Romania's colonial master. The work resulted in Arghezi's interment at Târgu Jiu camp, but remained immensely popular, including with his captors, carrying "the significance of a national mandate"; several authors propose that it was actually commissioned to him by disgruntled figures of the Antonescu administration. Baroane affirmed rural-based patriotism against the Nazi overlord, accused by Arghezi of having squandered Romania's natural resources, to which he had no right. Viewing Romanian demands as common-sense, and requiring no additional justification, Arghezi had dismantled Killinger's self-image, turning him into a monstrous apparition:

You placed your nib with its tens of thousands of nostrils on the cliffs of my water sources and you quaffed them from their depths and you drained them. Morass and slobber is what you leave behind in the mountains and yellow drought in the flatlands [...].

Arghezi's final prose work, under communism, was mainly done in journalism, travelogues, and art criticism; it alternates conformist pieces aligned with communist requirements and heart-felt fragments that, as Voncu notes, show Arghezi going through his "second youth". Several of his texts detail his 1956 trip to Moscow, where he was allowed to witness a partial return of the Romanian Treasure. The first fragments, carried in Scînteia, are read by Voncu as politically neutral; a more complete account, Din drum ("From the Road"), is described by Mihalache as unmitigated propaganda for Nikita Khrushchev and his policies. Overall, the late-stage Arghezian prose still included his core stylistic features. He also refrained from mentioning communism other than as "the regime", and generally avoided direct quotes from propaganda, except in pages he dedicated to the communist theorist Vladimir Lenin—treated here as a decent and inspirational figure. This revised Arghezi's earlier stances on Lenin: in 1929, he had described him as "the most idiotic of all the Russians" that the Romanian author had met in Geneva.

== Drama ==
Arghezi's one serious attempt to become a featured dramatist was Seringa ("The Syringe"), written while he was being held at Târgu Jiu. In documenting the play's 1947 premiere, theatrologist Ioan Massoff argued that the text is a "lampoon in dialogue form", which "only has documentary value". Seringa was instead cherished by critic Dan C. Mihăilescu, who revisited it in 1980, appreciating its "absurd, phenomenal, piercing humor". Its subject matter was picked up from the author's own experience with the medical profession: in 1939, he had been incapacitated for months by a mysterious illness, known for a while as the "Tudor Arghezi disease". He resented the various doctors who had tried to cure him, and was especially critical of Dumitru Bagdasar—who treated him for radiation therapy. Arghezi was adamant that his symptoms went away when an eccentric newcomer, Dumitru Grigoriu-Argeș, administered him a single injection with an unknown concoction. In 1955, the disease was revealed to have been a combination of spondylosis, pyelonephritis, and bone abscess, originating as a urinary tract infection. Though he openly rejoiced upon learning that Bagdasar, whom he regarded as a charlatan, had died of cancer, investigations consistently showed that Arghezi owed his recovery to the radiation regimen, which had greatly reduced the infection.

Scholar Constantin Cubleșan proposes that Arghezi's output in drama was divided as two distinct categories: Seringa belonged to a tradition of theatrical realism, with "easily recognizable" echoes from Ion Luca Caragiale (and with contemporary parallels in "bitter comedies" by Mihail Sebastian or George Mihail Zamfirescu), while other scattered farces were more daringly modernist, and akin to Absurdism. Mihăilescu was impressed by the latter category with its "diamonds in drama", also arguing that Arghezi was almost an original dramatist in translating plays by Molière and Bertold Brecht, since these required an in-depth adaptation of the comedic setting. In his work as a theatrical critic, Arghezi expressed fascination with Jacob Sternberg's stagecraft, with its minimalist and expressionist resources, and, in the late 1940s, was enthusiastic about Ion Sava's revival of the mask-theater. In advanced old age, Arghezi was working with Paul Călinescu on adapting Seringa as a screenplay. Though completed, and included in some anthologies, this revised version was never used for a film.

== Influence ==
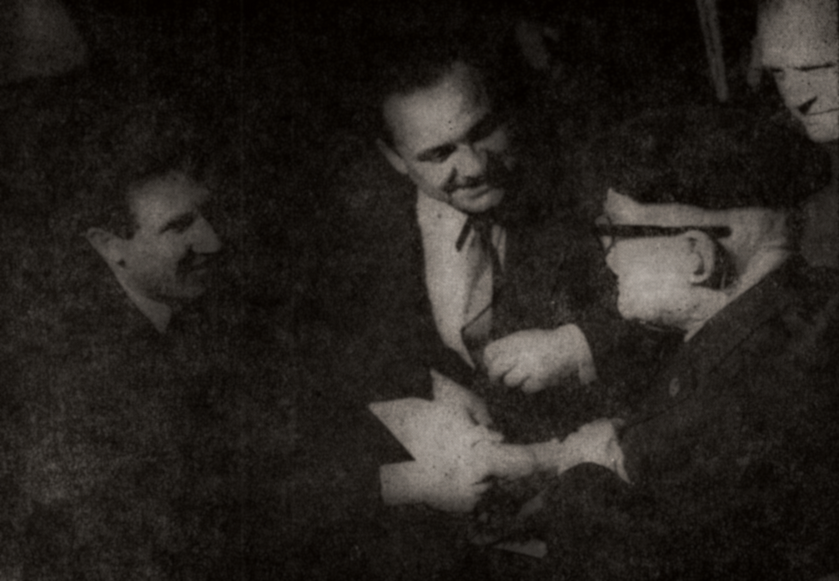
Arghezi shaking hands with his young disciple Marin Sorescu in 1966; also present are Arghezi's son Baruțu and Writers' Union president Zaharia Stancu

Scholars note that Arghezi endures as "perhaps the strongest personality in all of 20th-century Romanian literature" (Simion), worshiped as a "patriarch of Romanian poetry" (Romulus Dianu); as Rotaru observes, his works remain unparalleled in either a local context "or even (excluding obviously coincidental equivalences, of the sort that literary historians will be hunting for) among foreign authors." His revolutionary intrusion in the literary language was such that scholars such as George Călinescu analyzed all preceding poetry in relation with Arghezi, implying that most of such early products were necessarily inferior. Focusing on the linguistic register, Caraion claimed: "Eminescu has created [it]. Arghezi has turned it into a never-ending spectacle." While acknowledging his own perception as slightly inferior to Arghezi in a "trinity" of modern Romanian poets, Lucian Blaga called his older colleague "the very entelechy of the Romanian language." According to Crohmălniceanu, Arghezi (in conjunction with Blaga, Ion Barbu, and Alexandru A. Philippide) "resuscitated Romanian poetry's taste for life's cosmic dimension."

In his 1972 overview, Rotaru commented that Arghezi's imitators had been "surprisingly few", given his position as a mandatory reference. His influences on radical Symbolists were felt even before Cuvinte potrivite: in this proto-avant-garde, Benjamin Fondane allowed his own poetry to be infused with, and elevated by, Arghezian echoes. Arghezi is one of the idols explicitly mentioned by the avant-garde magazine unu in its opening issue of 1928. On one occasion, he made a point of rejecting the more programmatic followers, declaring himself opposed to the futurists at 75HP magazine, and asking that they remove him from their heroes' list. While his cultivation of Urmuz and other portions of the local avant-garde was generally influential, his Flori de mucigai was a more direct inspiration for the 1930s surrealist Geo Bogza. Within the sub-field of proletarian literature, he appeared as an intertextual reference in interwar poems by Aron Cotruș and Vladimir Cavarnali. Arghezianism stretched out into the deeply conservative Gândirea, where more or less discreet disciples included Nicolae Crevedia, Ilariu Dobridor, and Vasile Voiculescu. The latter also defended Arghezi against his communist censors, with a poem that celebrated him as a "mage" and "alchemist" of the poetic word.

Among the authors that came of age during World War II, Caraion was his most committed disciple. In the mid-to-late 1950s, rehabilitation imposed Arghezi as a necessary model for even younger writers, who had been previously unable to move out of communist schemas. In 1957, Eugen Barbu was the first novelist to embrace Arghezian aesthetics, similarly populating his novels with images of filth and degradation. A while after, Fănuș Neagu achieved fame for his unusual and confounding prose, with grammatical patterns and a range of expression that matched Arghezi's, while Ilie Purcaru expanded on Arghezi's style of lyrical propaganda, also in support of the Romanian Communist Party. Arghezi's satirical storytelling was meanwhile copied to a degree by Teodor Mazilu and Romulus Vulpescu, while his verse was being pastiched by Nichita Stănescu and parodied by Marin Sorescu. With Seringa, Arghezi also announced the "polemical comedies" of Aurel Baranga, which were popular at the height of communism.

Such influence was at least partly visible among the Optzeciști writers of late communism, who embraced interwar models for their experimentation and quality, but also reinterpreted them in an increasingly postmodern fashion. As one of that group, critic Ion Bogdan Lefter once included Arghezi and Urmuz among the repurposed figures in the previous avant-garde, establishing a "historical isotopy of negation". The naturalist lampoon was similarly applied to political poetry by Mircea Dinescu. Baruțu Arghezi, who spent much of his life in self-imposed exile, was also a participant in prolonging his father's aesthetic legacy. He only debuted as a poet in the 1990s, with volumes that evidenced borrowings from Tudor's lyrical language.

== Sources ==
- Baruțu T. Arghezi, "In memoriam", in Steaua, Vol. LXIV, Issues 4–5, April–May 1994, pp. 8–9.
- Nicolae Balotă, Arte poetice ale secolului XX: ipostaze românești și străine. Bucharest: Editura Minerva, 1976. OCLC 3445488
- Ion Caraion, "Prefață", in Tudor Arghezi, Versuri, pp. vii–cxxvi. Bucharest: Cartea Românească, 1980.
- Șerban Cioculescu, Varietăți critice. Bucharest: Editura pentru Literatură, 1966.
- Ovid S. Crohmălniceanu,
  - Literatura română și expresionismul. Bucharest: Editura Minerva, 1978.
  - Amintiri deghizate. Bucharest: Editura Nemira, 1994. ISBN 973-9144-49-7
- Ioan Lascu, "Roza vânturilor. Permanența criticii literare", in Convorbiri Literare, October 2019, pp. 91–94.
- Ioan Massoff, Teatrul românesc: privire istorică. Vol. VIII: Teatrul românesc în perioada 1940—1950. Bucharest: Editura Minerva, 1981.
- Florin Mihăilescu, De la proletcultism la postmodernism. Constanța: Editura Pontica, 2002. ISBN 973-9224-63-6
- Andi Mihalache, "Poetul și politica. Cazul Arghezi", in Analele Sighet, Vol. 6, 1998, pp. 632–646.
- Eugen Negrici,
  - Literatura română sub comunism. Proza. Bucharest: Editura Fundației PRO, 2006. ISBN 973-8434-08-4
  - Iluziile literaturii române. Bucharest: Cartea Românească, 2008. ISBN 978-973-23-1974-1
- Z. Ornea, Anii treizeci. Extrema dreaptă românească, pp. 444–445. Bucharest: Editura Fundației Culturale Române, 1995. ISBN 973-9155-43-X
- Ioana Pârvulescu, "Revista revistelor interbelice. Tudor Arghezi: mic dicționar onomastic", in România Literară, Issue 27/1997, pp. 12–13.
- Ion Rotaru, O istorie a literaturii române. Vol. II (De la 1900 pînă la cel de al doilea război mondial). Bucharest: Editura Minerva, 1972.
- Eugen Simion, Moartea lui Mercuțio. Bucharest: Editura Nemira, 1993. ISBN 973-9144-39-X
- Octav Șuluțiu, "Scriitori și cărți. Tudor Arghezi: Lina", in Familia, Vol. 77, Issue 9, September 1942, pp. 52–56.
- Ioana Tămăian, "Arghezi, Baruțu T."; Eugen Simion, "Arghezi, Tudor", in Dicționarul general al literaturii române. A/B, pp. 343–371. Bucharest: Museum of Romanian Literature, 2016. ISBN 978-973-167-381-3
- Gabriel Țepelea, Credință și speranță. Pagini de publicistică radiofonică: 1943–2004. Bucharest: Romanian Radio Broadcasting Company, 2006. ISBN 973-7902-46-7
