= The Midas Touch (1997 film) =

- Directed by: Peter Manoogian
- Starring: Trever O'Brien
- Release date: 1997
- Running time: 83 min.
- Countries: Romania; United States
- Language: English

The Midas Touch is a 1997 Romanian Drama, Comedy, Fantasy film directed by Peter Manoogian, and written by Peter Fedorenko and Keith Estrada, starring Trever O'Brien, Ashley Tesoro, Joey Simmrin.

The film produced by Harlan Freedman, Mark Headley, and executive producer Donald Kushner. the film was released on 30 December 1997.

== Plot ==
Drama about a 12-year-old boy who fantasises about having enough money to be able to cure his grandmother's serious heart condition. When he finds himself in a haunted house, the mysterious owner 'grants' him one wish - the Midas touch. The boy soon learns that it is more of a curse than a blessing when everything he touches turns into gold.

== Cast ==
- Trever O'Brien as Billy Bright
- Ashley Lyn Cafagna as Hannah
- Joey Simmrin as Leon
- David Jeremiah as Willy
- Marla Cotovsky as Cora
- Prasanna Kumara Dissanayake as Harry
- Danna Hansen as Granny
- Shannon Welles as Witch Lady
- Joseph Whipp as Guard
- Theodor Danetti as Old Man
- Peter Laci as Boy #1
- Mihai Radulescu as Boy #2
- Michael Larkin as Kid #1
- Gadriel Mican as Kid #2
- Ilinca Goia as Miss Henderson
- Jeff Brown as Police Officer
- Donald Mackenzie as Butler
- Mark Headley as Paramedic #1
- Cosmin Sofron as Paramedic #2
- Steve Gallens as Worker #1
- Nichita Moldoveau as Worker #2
- Dan Udrea as Attendant
- Rudi Rosenfeld as Security Boss
- Madalina Constantinescu as Girl
