= Tată de duminică =

Sunday Father
- Tată de duminică
- Directed by: Mihai Constantinescu
- Screenplay by: Octav Pancu-Iași
- Produced by: Sidonia Caracaș; Platon Pardău
- Starring: Amza Pellea; Radu Beligan; Gina Patrichi; Olga Delia Mateescu; Mircea Constantinescu Govora
- Cinematography: Costache Dumitru-Fony
- Edited by: Lucia Anton
- Music by: Temistocle Popa
- Production company: Casa de Filme 3
- Distributed by: Româniafilm
- Release date: 28 April 1975 (Romania)
- Running time: 91 minutes
- Country: Romania
- Language: Romanian

Tată de duminică (Sunday Father) is a 1975 Romanian film directed by Mihai Constantinescu and starring Amza Pellea, Radu Beligan, Gina Patrichi, Olga Delia Mateescu, and Mircea Constantinescu Govora.

== Cast ==
- Amza Pellea – Mircea Danu
- Radu Beligan – Grigore Manta
- Gina Patrichi – Adriana, ex-wife of Mircea Danu
- Olga Delia Mateescu – Simona
- Mircea Constantinescu Govora – Tudor
- Sebastian Constantinescu – Bogdan, son of Mircea Danu
- Ruxandra Sin – Maria
- Mihai Cociașu – George, son of Grigore Manta
- Boris Ciornei – Manole
- Monica Ghiuță – nurse Suzana
- Cornel Coman – Captain Manolescu
- Andrei Codarcea – driver Constantin Neagu
- Cornel Vulpe
- Nae Ștefănescu
- Gheorghe Visu – driver Firică
- Emil Mandric
- Anton Nicolae
- Bogdan Constantinescu
- Ileana Codarcea
- Teodor Mazilu
- Cornelia Turian
- Petre Gheorghiu-Goe
- Dina Protopopescu
- Mario Bălășescu
- Tatiana Iekel
- Gheorghe Negoescu
- Eugenia Ardeleanu
- Alexandru Vasiliu
- Pompilia Vasiliu
- Călin Florian
- Ion Niciu
- Gheorghe Daneș
- Mihai Stoenescu
- Petre Vasilescu
- Ion Smeianu
- Zina Bogos
- Romeo Mogoș
- Petre Kuhn
- Ion Grapini
- Dumitru Ghiuzelea
- Petre Popescu
- Mihai Bucur
