= The Excalibur Kid =

- Written by: Antony Anderson
- Directed by: James Head
- Starring: Jason McSkimming; François Klanfer; Mac Fyfe; Francesca Scorsone; Natalie Ester; Serban Celea; Theodor Danetti; George Duta; Camelia Maxim; Claudiu Trandafir; Constantin Draganescu; Iulia Boros; Adrian Ciobanu; Vitalie Bantas; Marcel Cobzariu; Mihnea Trusca; Marius Florea Vizante; Liviu Timus; Constantin Florescu; Razvan Popa; Felix Totolici; Vlad Jipa
- Music by: Paul Intson
- Countries of origin: Canada; Romania; United States
- Original language: English

Production
- Producer: Cris Andrei
- Cinematography: Viorel Sergovici
- Editor: Paul Winestock
- Running time: 88 minutes
- Production companies: Canarom Productions; Castel Film Romania; Chesler/Perlmutter Productions; The Kushner-Locke Company

Original release
- Release: March 23, 1999

The Excalibur Kid is a 1999 TV movie.

== Synopsis ==
Transported back in time to medieval England, Zack lands in the middle of a vicious battle between an evil witch and Merlin, the master sorcerer, for control of Arthur's kingdom. It's up to Zack to help Merlin and Arthur reclaim the magic sword Excalibur and return Arthur to his rightful place on the throne.

== Cast ==
- Jason McSkimming as Zack
- François Klanfer as Merlin
- Mac Fyfe as Arthur
- Francesca Scorsone as Morgause
- Natalie Ester as Gwyneth
- Serban Celea as Sir Ector
- Theodor Danetti as Old Man at Court
- George Duta as Jeffy
- Camelia Maxim as Gail
- Claudiu Trandafir as Jim
- Constantin Draganescu as Old Man with Cart
- Iulia Boros as Innkeeper
- Adrian Ciobanu as King Carados
- Vitalie Bantas as Dolt 1
- Marcel Cobzariu as Dolt 24
- Mihnea Trusca as Kay
- Marius Florea Vizante as Cassian
- Liviu Timus as Nasty Man
- Constantin Florescu as King Bans
- Razvan Popa as Duke of St. Ives
- Felix Totolici as Courtier 1 (figuration role)
- Vlad Jipa as Courtier 3 (figuration role)
