= Păulești, Vrancea =

Păulești
- Commune
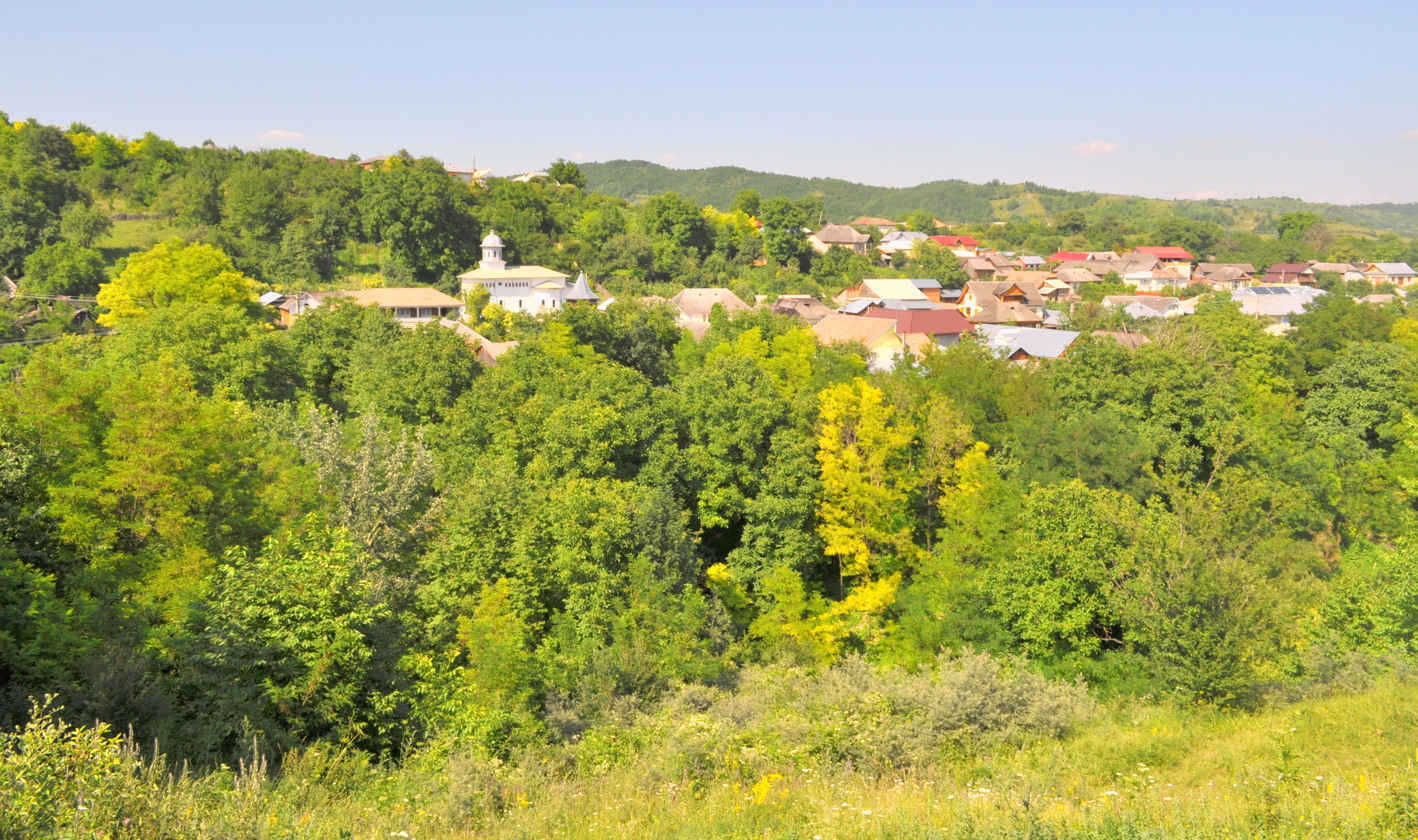

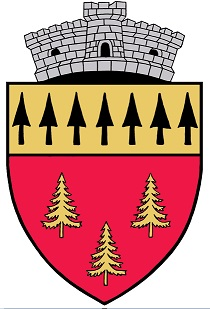
- Coat of arms

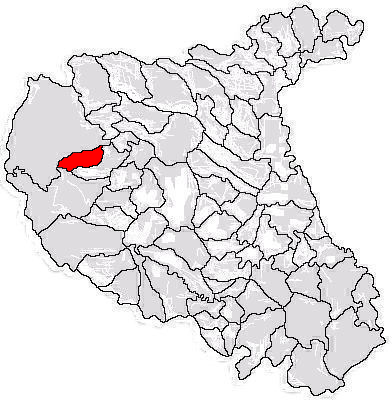
- Location in Vrancea County

- Location in Romania
- Coordinates: 45°53′N 26°41′E
- Country: Romania
- County: Vrancea

Government
  - Mayor (2024–2028): Dănuț Soare (PSD)
- Area: 171.34 km^{2} (66.15 sq mi)
- Elevation: 461 m (1,512 ft)
- Population (2021-12-01): 1,815
  - Density: 10.59/km^{2} (27.44/sq mi)
- Time zone: UTC+02:00 (EET)
  - Summer (DST): UTC+03:00 (EEST)
- Postal code: 627371
- Area code: +(40) 237
- Vehicle reg.: VN
- Website: www.paulesti.primarievn.ro

Păulești is a commune in Vrancea County, Romania, with a population of 1,815 as of 2021. It is composed of two villages, Hăulișca and Păulești. These were part of Tulnici Commune until 2003, when they were split off.

A wayside cross in Hăulișca, built in 1937, commemorates the soldiers who died in World War I.

Historical population
Year	Pop.	±%
2002	2,160	—
2011	1,834	−15.1%
2021	1,815	−1.0%
Source: Census data

== Natives ==
- Leopoldina Bălănuță (1934–1998), actress
