= The Moment (1979 film) =

1979 film

- Directed by: Gheorghe Vitanidis
- Written by: Dinu Săraru
- Produced by: Dumitru Fernoagă
- Starring: Violeta Andrei
- Cinematography: Nicu Stan
- Production company: Casa de Filme 5
- Release date: August 1979
- Running time: 138 minutes
- Country: Romania
- Language: Romanian

The Moment (Romanian: Clipa) is a 1979 Romanian drama film directed by Gheorghe Vitanidis. It competed at the 11th Moscow International Film Festival.

== Cast ==
- Violeta Andrei
- Leopoldina Bălănuță
- Gheorghe Cozorici
- Ion Dichiseanu
- Vasile Nițulescu
- Sebastian Papaiani
- Emanoil Petruț
- Margareta Pogonat
- Mitică Popescu
- Rodica Tapalagă
- Olga Tudorache
