= Mihai Constantinescu =

Romanian film director and screenwriter (1932–2019)

- Born: 20 August 1932; Băile Govora, Vâlcea County, Kingdom of Romania
- Education: Caragiale National University of Theatre and Film
- Occupations: Film director, screenwriter
- Years active: 1961–1987

Mihai Constantinescu (Romanian pronunciation: [miˈhaj ˌkonstantiˈnesku]; born 20 August 1932) is a Romanian film director and screenwriter.

Born in Băile Govora, he graduated from the I.L. Caragiale Institute of Theatre and Film Arts (IATC) in 1956.

== Filmography ==
=== As director ===
- Pe litoral mi-a rămas inima (1961)
- Opt minute de vis (1965)
- Cîntecele mării (1971) – Assistant director
- Despre o anumită fericire (1973)
- Tată de duminică (1975)
- Singurătatea florilor (1976)
- Premiera (1976)
- Lumini și umbre (1981–1982) – TV movie
- Eroii nu au vârstă (1984) – TV series
- Un oaspete la cină (1986)
- Să-ți vorbesc despre mine (1987)

=== As screenwriter ===
- Opt minute de vis (1965)
- Să-ți vorbesc despre mine (1987)

=== As actor ===
- Dacii (1967)
- Rețeaua S (1980)

== See also ==
- List of Romanian film and theatre directors
- List of Romanian films
