= Teatrul Tineretului =

Theatre in Piatra Neamț, Romania

Coordinates: 46.9322°N 26.368°E

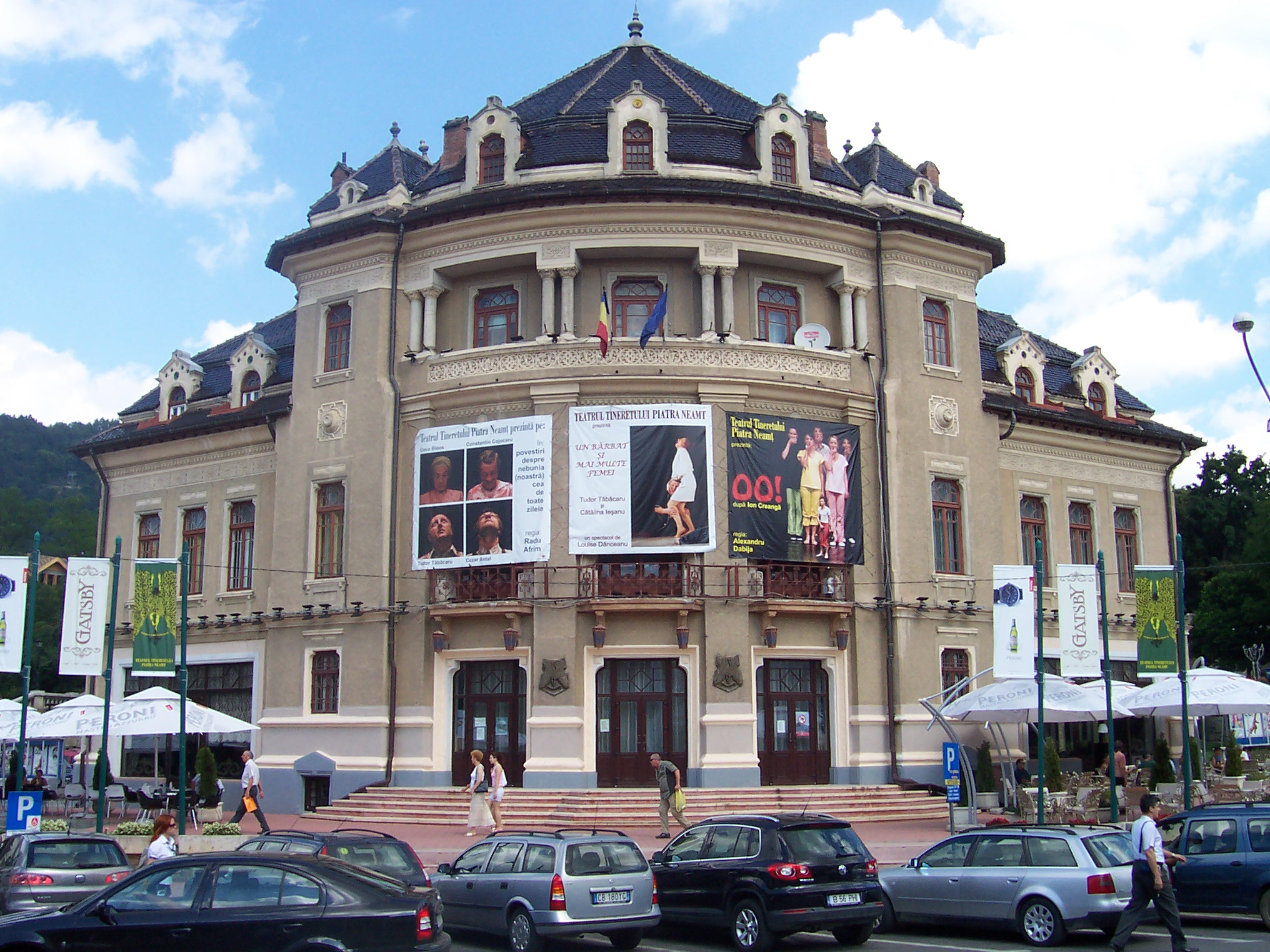
Teatrul Tineretului

Teatrul Tineretului (Youth's Theatre) is a cultural institution and a landmark in the city of Piatra Neamț, Romania. It is one of the most well-known theaters in Romania, as many important Romanian actors began their careers here. For over 50 years, Teatrul Tineretului has been a major cultural institution in Romania.

== History ==
The theatre building was built between 1929 and 1947. After World War II, theaters in Romania, like many other cultural institutions, lacked funding and most importantly, help and understanding from the ruling Communist Party. Ion Coman, appointed manager of the theater by the new post-war rulers, unlike most political appointees of that time, loved theater and fell in love with the institution and its people. Coman became overnight, a talent agent, searching for actors, newly graduates of drama schools throughout the country. He encouraged young actors to come to Piatra Neamț, and using his personal connections with the Communist Party, arranged for the newcomers a commodity that few other institutions of that time offered, housing for the young actors.

The first generation of actors that put TT in the spotlight included Florin Piersic, Leopoldina Bălănuță and Radu (Dodo) Voicescu. Later on, they were followed by Mitică Popescu, Valentin Uritescu, Ileana Stana-Ionescu, Horațiu Mălăele, Gelu Nitu, Florian Pittis, Corneliu-Dan Borcia, Florin (Pufi) Măcelaru, Ion Musca, Traian Parlog, Mimi Caragiu, Maia Morgenstern, Cornel Nicoară, Liviu Timuș, Coca Bloos, Oana Albu, Constantin Ghenescu, Cristian Motriuc, and many others.

After Coman's tenure ended, managers that followed him continued the same wonderful tradition of encouraging young actors to come to Piatra Neamț. Among them, Edi Covali (director and writer), Emil Mandric (director), Nicolae Scarlat (director), Mircea Zaharia, Dan Borcia (actor), Cornel Nicoară (actor), Liviu Timuș (actor), and the current manager, Gianina Cărbunariu (director and writer).

In 1967, the theater changed its name from the Piatra Neamţ State Theater to the Piatra Neamţ Youth Theater.
