= Leopoldina Bălănuță =

Romanian actress

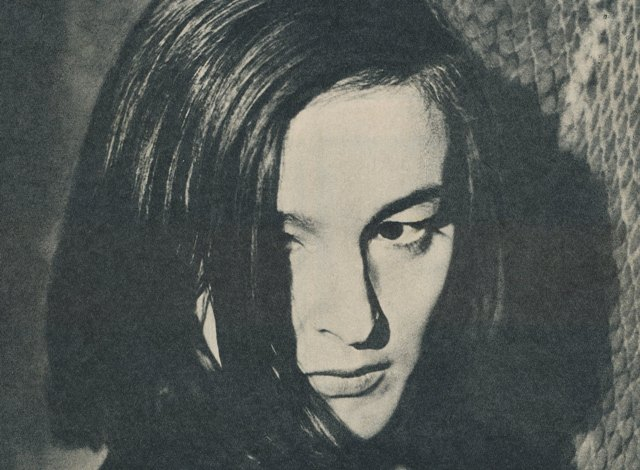
- Born: Leopoldina Bălănuţă; 10 December 1934; Hăulișca, Vrancea County, Kingdom of Romania
- Died: 14 October 1998 (aged 63); Bucharest, Romania
- Resting place: Bellu Cemetery, Bucharest
- Education: Institute of Theatre and Film Arts
- Occupation: Actress
- Years active: 1963–1998
- Spouse: Mitică Popescu (m. 1977–1998)
- Awards: Order of Cultural Merit

Leopoldina Bălănuță (Romanian pronunciation: [le.opolˈdina bələˈnut͡sə]; 10 December 1934 – 14 October 1998) was a Romanian actress.

== Biography ==
She was born in her grandparents' house in Hăulișca, Vrancea County, the daughter of Neculai Bălănuță, a priest, and Sanda. She was a 1958 graduate of the Institute of Theatre and Film Arts (IATC), Bucharest.

In 1967, Bălănuță was awarded the Order of Cultural Merit, fourth class.

Her father was an Orthodox priest in Focșani. She was married to actor Mitică Popescu. She died in Bucharest, and was buried in the city's Bellu Cemetery.

== Selected filmography ==
- The Subterranean (1967), as Irina Jelescu
- The Moment (1979), as Maria Nobilu
- The Oak (1992), as Nela's mother
