= Mitică Popescu =

Romanian actor (1936–2023)

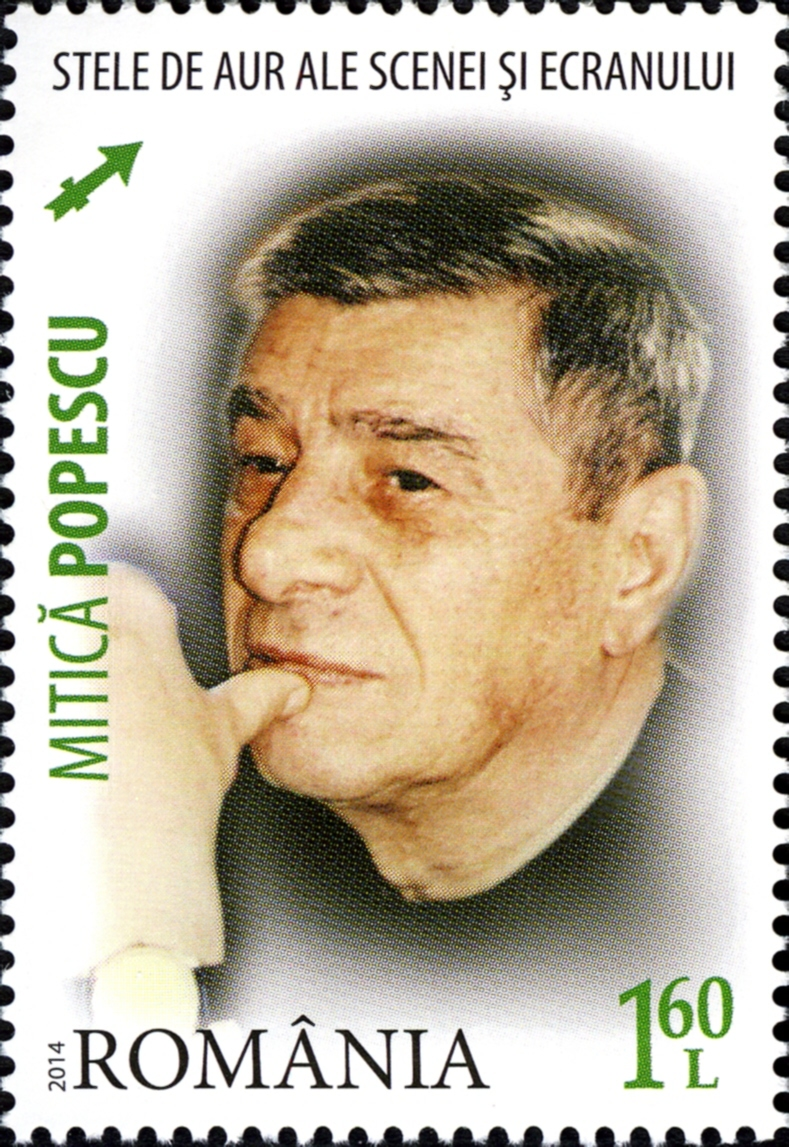
- Born: Mitică Popescu; 2 December 1936; Bucharest, Kingdom of Romania
- Died: 3 January 2023 (aged 86); Bucharest, Romania
- Burial place: Bellu Cemetery, Bucharest
- Education: Institute of Theatrical and Cinematographic Art
- Occupation: Actor
- Years active: 1973–2023
- Spouse: Leopoldina Bălănuță (m. 1977; died 1998)
- Awards: National Order of Faithful Service; Gopo Award for lifetime achievement

Mitică Popescu (Romanian pronunciation: [miˈtikə poˈpesku]; 2 December 1936 – 3 January 2023) was a Romanian actor.

== Biography ==
Popescu was born in Bucharest on 2 December 1936. He started his studies in the mid-1950s at the Institute of Theatrical and Cinematographic Art, but was arrested by the Securitate in 1958, allegedly for planning to flee the country, and was sentenced to 3 years in prison. First detained at Malmaison Prison in Bucharest, he was transferred to Jilava Prison, and then to the labor camps at Periprava and Salcia on the Danube. Upon release, Radu Beligan and Mircea Șeptilici helped him find a job at Teatrul de Comedie, and in 1963 he resumed his acting studies.

After graduating in 1967, he worked at Teatrul Tineretului in Piatra Neamț, where he stayed until 1973, when he transferred to Teatrul Mic in Bucharest, on whose stage he played until 2010. In 2002 he was awarded the National Order of Faithful Service, knight rank. In 2009 he received a lifetime career award from UNITER, while in 2013 he received the Gopo Award for lifetime achievements.

In 1977, Popescu married the actress Leopoldina Bălănuță, who died in 1998. He died on 3 January 2023, at the age of 86, at the Elias Hospital in Bucharest, where he was hospitalized. He was buried with military honors in the city's Bellu Cemetery, next to his wife.

== Activity ==
=== Theatre ===
- Philadelphia Here I Come! by Brian Friel (1973)
- Vreți să jucați cu noi? by Alecu Popovici (1974)
- Matca by Marin Sorescu (1974) – Logodnicul, Momâie
- Răspântia cea mare by Victor Ion Popa (1974) – Andrei
- Life of Galileo by Bertolt Brecht (1975) – Sagredo
- Mânia posturilor by Vasile Alecsandri (1975) – Serviescu
- The Andersonville Trial by Saul Levitt (1976) – Doctor John C. Bates
- The Wild Duck by Henrik Ibsen (1976) – Hjalmar Ekdal
- Cititorul by contor by Paul Everac (1976)
- The Cave Dwellers by William Saroyan (1976) – The duke
- Două ore de pace by Dumitru Radu Popescu (1977) – Stelică
- Omul, continuați să puneți întrebări by Ada D'Albon (1977)
- The Émigrés by Slawomir Mrozek (1977)
- The Madwoman of Chaillot by Jean Giraudoux (1978) – The garbageman
- Să îmbrăcăm pe cei goi by Luigi Pirandello (1978) – Lodovico Nota
- Absurd Person Singular by Alan Ayckbourn (1979) – Sidney Hopcroft
- Nu sunt Turnul Eiffel by Ecaterina Oproiu (1979) – Old man
- O șansă pentru fiecare by Radu F. Alexandru (1979) – The functionary
- Evul mediu întâmplător by Romulus Guga (1980) – Ioachim
- The Master and Margarita by Mihail Bulgakov (1980) – Koroviev
- Niște țărani by Dinu Săraru (1981) – Năiță Lucean
- Ca frunza dudului din rai by Dumitru Radu Popescu (1982) – Ticlete
- Ivona, Princess of Burgundia by Witold Gombrowicz (1983) – King Ignat
- Mitică Popescu by Camil Petrescu (1984)
- O femeie drăguță cu o floare și ferestre spre nord by Edvard Radzinsky (1986) – Fedea
- Actorii (1990)
- The Mandrake by Niccolò Machiavelli (1991) – Messer Niccia
- Les Monstres sacrés by Jean Cocteau (1991) – Florent
- Jacques and his Master by Milan Kundera (1992) – Jacques
- The Seagull by Anton Chekhov (1993) – Piotr Nikolaevici Sorin
- As You Like It by William Shakespeare (1996) – Amiens
- She Stoops to Conquer by Oliver Goldsmith (1997) – Mr. Hardcastle
- Barefoot in the Park by Neil Simon (1997) – Victor Velasco
- The Ghost Sonata by August Strindberg (1999) – The old man
- The School for Wives by Molière (1999) – Chrysalby
- The Servant of Two Masters by Carlo Goldoni (1999) – Pantalone
- Cimitirul păsărilor by Antonio Gala (2000) – Deogracias
- Viitorul e maculatură by Vlad Zografi (2000) – Julien Rougier
- Alex and Morris by Michael Elkin (2000) – Morris
- Colonia îngerilor by Ștefan Caraman (2000) – The old man

=== Filmography ===
- Umilință (2011) - Sandu
- Ticăloșii (2007)
- Păcală se întoarce (2006) – a peasant
- Sistemul nervos (2005)
- Lotus (2004) – Manasia
- Dulcea saună a morții (2003) – Mutul
- Turnul din Pisa (2002) – Colonel
- The Earth's Most Beloved Son (1993) – Securitate officer
- Rosenemil (1993)
- Rămânerea (1992)
- Miss Litoral (1990)
- Idolul și Ion-Anapoda(1988) –
- Drumeț în calea lupilor (1988) – poștașul
- Un studio în căutarea unei vedete (1988)
- The Moromete Family (1987) – Cocoșilă
- Trenul by aur (1987) – Comisar Munteanu
- Căsătorie cu repetiție (1985) – Mitică
- Fapt divers (1984)
- Emisia continuă (1984)
- Fram (Serial TV) (1983)
- Mitul lui Mitică (1982) – himself
- Un Saltimbanc la Polul Nord (1982)
- Saltimbancii (1981)
- Vânătoarea by vulpi (1980) – Năiță Lucean
- The Moment (1979)
- Vacanță tragică (1979)
- Doctorul Poenaru (1978)
- Mînia (1978)
- Gustul și culoarea fericirii (1978)
- Tufă de Veneția (1977)
- Statuia (1977)
- Serenadă pentru etajul XII (1976)
- Tănase Scatiu (1976) – Marin
- Red Apples (1976) – prosecutor
- Orașul văzut de sus (1975)
- Zidul (1974) – Manea
- Stejar – extremă urgență (1974) – Peter
- Dincolo de nisipuri (1974) – Romniceanu
