= Philosophical poets =

Mystical Scientific Poem

A philosophical poet is a poetic writer who employs poetic devices to explore subjects common to the field of philosophy, esp. those revolving around language: e.g., philosophy of language, semiotics, phenomenology, hermeneutics, literary theory, psychoanalysis, and critical theory. Philosophical poets, like mystics, anchor themselves, through an ideal, to the intelligible form of the object by juxtaposing its symbols and qualities. They rely on intuition and the intersubjectivity of their senses to depict reality. Their writings address truth through figurative language (i.e. metaphor) in questions related to the meaning of life, the nature of being (ontology), theories of knowledge and knowing (epistemology), principles of beauty (aesthetics), first principles of things (metaphysics) or the existence of God.

== Overview ==
Some philosophical poets may make broad philosophical inquires and engage with diverse philosophical topics throughout their poetry, while others may concentrate within one branch of philosophical poetry. For example, Dante is considered by some to be both a philosophical poet, in a general sense, as well as a metaphysical poet.

Although a group discussion may provide fruitful conditions for some to explore philosophical themes, poetry may be seen an alternative entry into philosophical thinking. Children and young writers may find it easier to begin writing philosophical poetry if they start by using poetic styles other than rhyme, such as repetitive form, since rhyme can be distracting and may interfere with the free flow of their philosophical thoughts. Most, but not all, philosophical poets do eventually develop one preferred form of philosophical verse when it comes to the style of their writing. For example, Rumi and Hafiz often utilize the single verse form, while Dickinson usually adheres to the quatrain form. Philosophical poets hail from both the Eastern and Western traditions.

== Notable philosophical poets ==
- Dante Alighieri
- John Ashbery
- Gaston Bachelard
- Henri Bergson
- William Blake
- Countee Cullen
- Emily Dickinson
- T.S. Eliot
- Édouard Glissant
- Johann Wolfgang Goethe
- Hafiz
- Gwen Harwood
- Søren Kierkegaard
- Khayyam
- Lucretius
- William Vaughn Moody
- Friedrich Nietzsche
- Njegoš
- Kay Ryan
- Rumi
- Ayn Rand
- Walt Whitman
- C.K. Williams
- William Wordsworth

== See also ==
- Analogon
- Atmosphere (architecture and spatial design)
- Bricolage
- Cosmopolitanism
- Dialectic
- Dianoia
- List of Persian-language poets and authors
- Logos
- Mysticism
- Negative capability
- Other (philosophy)
- Panpsychism
- Poetics (Aristotle)
- Praxis (process)
- Psychical nomadism
- Simulacrum
- Situationist International
- Stendhal syndrome
- Sublime (philosophy)
- Third eye
- Transcendence (philosophy)
- Transparent eyeball
- Trompe-l'œil
- Wise old man
- Wise Old Man and Wise Old Woman

== Literature ==
- Chengde Chen. Philosophical Poems as 'Caricatures of Thought' // The Philosopher, Volume LXXXIX No. 2
- Iyer, Lars. «The Birth of Philosophy in Poetry: Blanchot, Char, Heraclitus.» Janus Head, Journal of Interdisciplinary Studies in Continental Philosophy, Literature, Phenomenological Psychology and the Arts 4. 2 (2001): 358—383.
- Magas L.I. Artistic and stylistic patterns of Ivan Franko's philosophical poems// Вісник Маріупольського державного університету. Сер.: Філологія. 2013. № 9. С. 26-31.
- Cherniss H., «Ancient forms of philosophic discourse» (1970), in H.Cherniss, Selected. Papers, ed. L. Tarán, Leyde, 1977, p. 14-35.
