= De-Stalinization in Romania =

The De-Stalinization in Romania was a process of removing Stalinist policies and Stalin's cult of personality between 1956 and 1965. Implemented by Gheorghe Gheorghiu-Dej, it included the marginalization of Stalinists such as Ana Pauker and a large-scale amnesty of thousands of political prisoners. A number of political and cultural figures from the 19th century fight for independence were rehabilitated and writers formerly considered "bourgeois decadent" (like Tudor Arghezi) were allowed to publish again. It marked the beginning of a period of liberalization in Communist Romania, which ended in 1971 with the July Theses returning the country to the Totalitarian side which was renamed Ceauşism.

== Changes in placenames ==
Many placenames, companies and institutions had been named after Stalin and the "classics of Marxism", as well as Romanian Communist heroes. Most of these were reverted in the 1960s. This began in 1962, with the reverting everything that was named after Stalin: Brașov (which had been named Orașul Stalin), two raions in Bucharest, 23 national companies, 28 local companies, 26 agricultural cooperatives, 5 schools, 285 socio-cultural institutions (hospitals, clubs, stadiums, etc.) and 541 avenues, streets and parks.

Some placenames named after Lenin were also changed, but many were also kept. The reason for the change was to have a better proportion between international and local names, part of the advancement of National Communism in Romania.

== Political rehabilitation ==
A number of political figures were also granted political rehabilitation. Most had been party members who fled to the Soviet Union and were targeted during the Great Purge, like activist and former Comintern representative Ghiță Moscu, or had been targeted during the early years of the Romanian Communist Party's rule, such as economist Gogu Rădulescu.
