= Tudor Arghezi House =

Home of Tudor Arghezi, Romania

- Casa memorială Tudor Arghezi (Romanian)
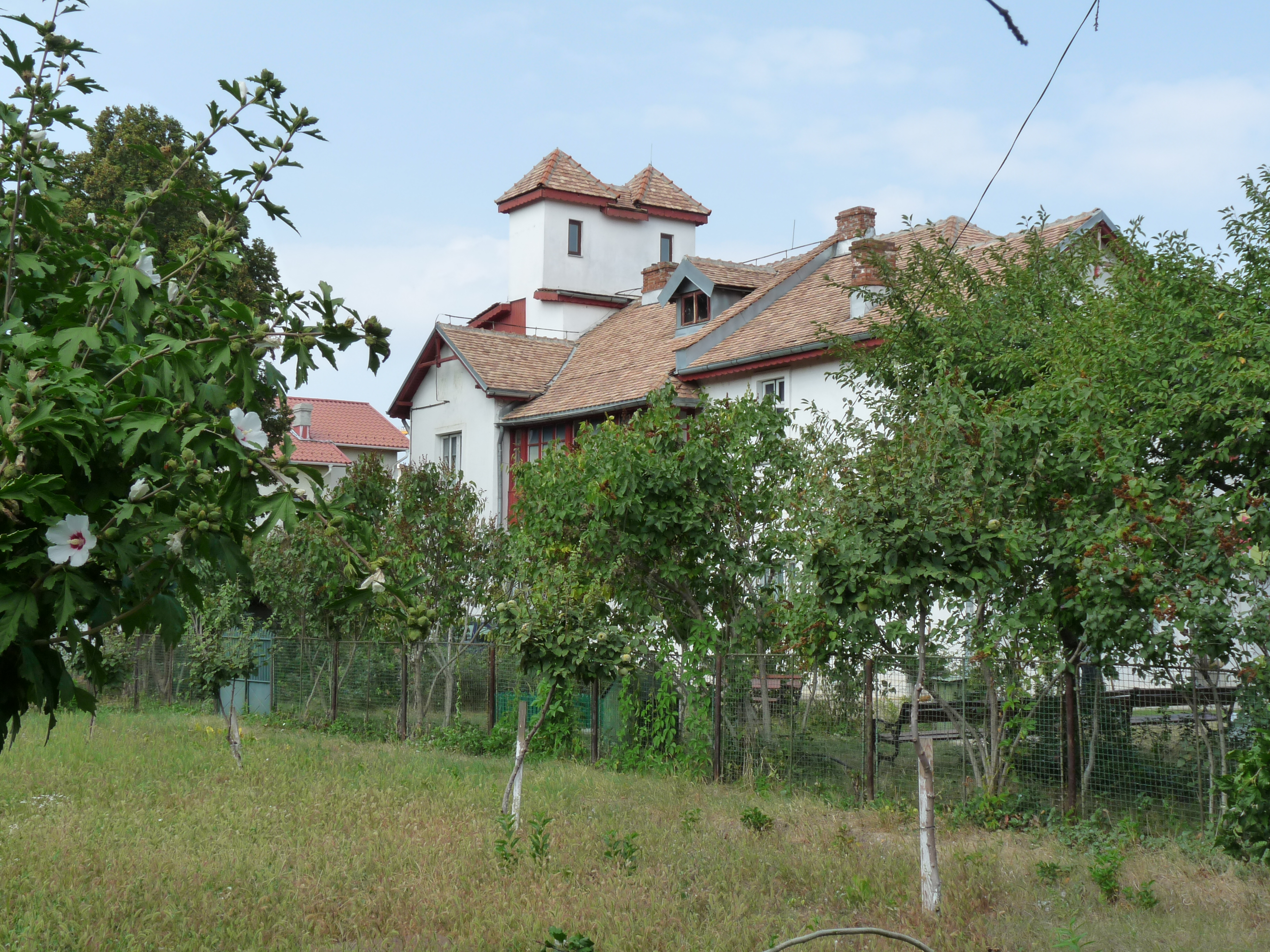
- Arghezi's house
- Interactive map of Tudor Arghezi House
- 44.3984°N 26.11849°E
- Location: 26 Mărțișor Street, Sector 4, Bucharest, Romania

History
- Built: 1930
- Built for: Tudor Arghezi

Site notes
- Architect: Jahanes
- Governing body: Ministry of Culture and National Patrimony (Romania)
- Owner: Traian Radu

Monument istoric
- Type: Architectural Monument of National Interest
- Designated: 2006
- Part of: National Register of Historic Monuments (Romanian: Lista Monumentelor Istorice (LMI))
- Reference no.: B-II-m-B-19174

The Memorial House of Tudor Arghezi, also known as Casa Mărțișor, is a historic monument located in the Dealul Piscului area of Sector 4, Bucharest, Romania. The house served as the residence of the Romanian writer Tudor Arghezi from 1930 until his death in 1967.

== History ==
On June 10, 1926, Tudor Arghezi acquired the land where the house would later be built. The area, formerly known as Mahalaua Cărămidarilor, was near Piața Sudului and the Văcărești Monastery. Arghezi initiated the construction of the house with the assistance of Swedish architect Jahanes, designing it according to his own vision. The house was completed in stages, with Arghezi and his wife, Paraschiva, moving into three of the twenty rooms by 1930.

Between 1935 and 1937, an annex was added to the property, which became Arghezi's personal printing workshop. He worked there with his son, Baruțu, printing books and magazines. In 1948, the property was nationalized by the Romanian Communist Party. Arghezi agreed to relinquish ownership on the condition that the house be preserved as a memorial following his death. This wish was fulfilled when the house was opened to the public on May 20, 1974. In 2006, it was designated a Memorial Museum under the administration of the National Museum of Romanian Literature.

For many years, the honorary director of the museum was Arghezi's daughter, Mitzura Arghezi. The museum occupies the upper floor of the house, while the ground floor remains under the ownership of the Arghezi family heirs. After Mitzura's death, Traian Radu, a close friend of hers, became the heir, a decision contested by Arghezi's granddaughter, Doina Theodorescu Arghezi.

In the garden, where the original house and a beekeeping area once stood, are the graves of Tudor, Paraschiva, and Mitzura Arghezi.

== See also ==
- List of monumente istorice in Romania
- List of museums in Bucharest
