= Baruțu T. Arghezi =

Romanian writer (1925–2010)

- Born: Iosif Theodorescu; 28 December 1925; Bucharest, Romania
- Died: 26 August 2010 (aged 84); Arad, Romania
- Occupation: Writer
- Father: Tudor Arghezi

Baruțu T. Arghezi (born Iosif Theodorescu; 28 December 1925, Bucharest – 26 August 2010, Arad) was a Romanian prose writer, essayist and publicist, the son of Tudor Arghezi, brother of Mitzura Arghezi and half brother of Eli Lotar. He was a member of the Writers' Union of Romania and the author of over twenty volumes and numerous literary and political studies published in the country and abroad. The main subject of his writings is the village, villagers, art and authentic peasant culture.
