= Tudor Arghezi =

Romanian writer and political figure (1880–1967)

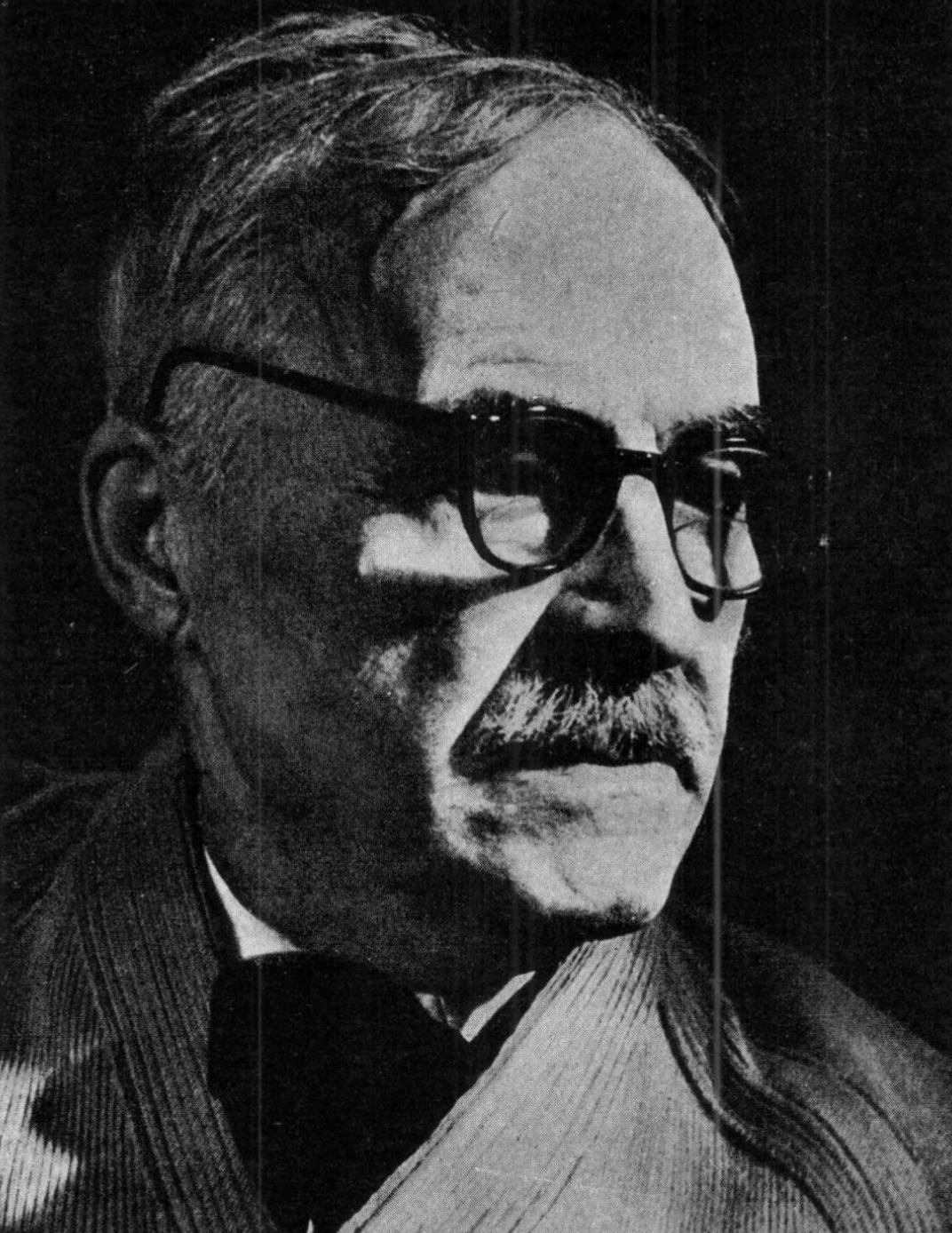
- Arghezi in 1960
- Born: Ion Nae Theodorescu; 21 May 1880; Bucharest, Principality of Romania
- Died: 14 July 1967 (aged 87); Bucharest, Socialist Republic of Romania
- Occupations: Journalist, critic, dramaturge, translator, politician, typographer, publisher, teacher, watchmaker, jeweler, farmer, laborer, monk, draftsman
- Spouse(s): Constanța Zissu (m. 1912; div. 1914) Paraschiva Burdea (m. 1916; died 1966)
- Children: Eli Lotar; Mitzura; Baruțu
- Writing career
- Years active: 1894–1967
- Genres: Lyric poetry; political poetry; social poetry; narrative poetry; philosophical poem; ballad; epithalamium; epigram; prose poem; fantasy literature; novella; political novel; autobiographical novel; essay; satire; lampoon; farce; children's literature; fable; reportage; sketch story; biography; memoir; travel writing; screenplay
- Movements: Symbolism (Romanian); Modernism; Expressionism; Naturalism; Socialist realism

Tudor Arghezi (Romanian pronunciation: [ˈtudor arˈɡezi]; born Ion Nae Theodorescu; 21 May 1880 – 14 July 1967) was a Romanian writer and political figure, widely considered one of his country's greatest poets (second only to Mihai Eminescu). An illegitimate, part-Hungarian child who was purposely vague about his roots, he had a troubled youth during which he held a variety of jobs—including a stint as a hierodeacon of the Romanian Orthodox Church, from which he gathered his extreme anti-clericalism. He debuted in the 1890s as an affiliate of the Symbolist movement, being welcomed as an outstanding poet. Arghezi renounced this career to study theology in Switzerland, but never graduated, training instead as a watchmaker and typographer. From 1910, his social poetry and leftist journalism became widely read, allowing him to return as a professional writer and art columnist. He soon became highly controversial for his apparent corruption and his mordant satire, as well as for his political positions during World War I—when, as editor of Seara and Cronica, he favored the Central Powers. Arghezi stayed behind in occupied Bucharest after the Romanian Debacle of 1916, collaborating with the German Empire in a manner that was judged as treasonous. In postwar Greater Romania, he was initially punished with imprisonment at Văcărești (an experience which informed his interwar poetry and prose), but amnestied within months.

Arghezi returned to political journalism, frequently changing sides and patrons, but remained constant in his promotion of avant-garde literature. Credited with having discovered the similarly influential Urmuz, he set up his own review, Bilete de Papagal, which helped launch careers. He only published his poetry as books when he was in his forties, becoming instantly famous. Initially well-liked for his bridging of modernist literature and thematic traditionalism, he became reviled, especially in conservative circles, for the extreme naturalism and grotesque expressionism found in his subsequent works. Arghezi had a consuming dispute with the nationalist ideologue Nicolae Iorga, but never fully rejected nationalism, and seemingly agreed with conservatives, as well as with far-right groups such as the Iron Guard, on a number of topics. By 1930, he was a virtual client of Carol II, Romania's authoritarian king. Largely with money obtained from Carol, Arghezi maintained his estate of Mărțișor, located outside his former prison; it is known as the setting of his other poetic cycles and his children's literature. For a while, he was absent from the literary scene due to a misdiagnosed disease, and preserved from this a hatred of the medical profession.

Initially, Arghezi was protected by Ion Antonescu, who, as dictator of Romania, aligned the country with Nazi Germany. He wrote a number of regime-sanctioned texts. In 1943, he published a satirical piece targeting Germany's envoy, Manfred von Killinger; though this text was likely vetted by some members of the governing apparatus, he was briefly interned at Târgu Jiu, and as such obtained cult status in anti-fascist circles. Upon Antonescu's toppling in 1944, he resumed publication of Bilete de Papagal; this period inaugurated his ambiguous relationship with the Romanian Communist Party, alternating polite cohabitation and outspoken independence. Eventually singled out as a "decadent", he found himself censored throughout 1948–1953, only finding work as a translator. He was progressively rehabilitated during the early stages of de-Stalinization, but only in return for major concessions to the official dogmas of Marxism-Leninism. His detractors criticized his quick adaptation to such tenets, but he was defended by others as constrained by circumstances, and as salvaging whatever was left of pre-communist culture. Arghezi was the subject of a cult of personality from the late 1950s, and served a term in the Great National Assembly. He was a member of the Romanian Academy and a recipient of the Herder Prize.

While widely disliked for his political compromises, he remains universally acclaimed for his talent, his inventiveness, and his reshaping of the literary language. He took pride in upgrading the lower-class register of speech, and also extensively used the Oltenian dialect, with which he identified culturally. In his creation of new poetic forms, he also borrowed the conventions of Christian poetry to contextualize his own embrace of agnosticism and delving into heresy. He is less celebrated as a novelist, since his work there was less rigorous, often creating prose poetry rather than full-fledged epics. His immense literary output was reissued in critical editions that took almost five decades to print, with his children Mitzura and Baruțu serving as curators. His first-born and estranged son was the expatriate photographer Eli Lotar.

== Biography ==
=== Origins and debut ===
Arghezi, a lifelong critic of criminology, and notoriously shy about exposing his own past, equated biographical criticism with biostatistics, seeing both as undignified; he was also prone to self-mystification, always willing to astonish or simply amuse his audience. As observed by the literary scholar Eugen Simion, his "immense body of work" has a "scarcity of intimate detail", and he "did not leave a diary". While is known for certain that Ion Nae Theodorescu, the future Arghezi, was born in Bucharest (then capital of the Romanian Principality) on 21 May 1880, the other details of his origins were only clarified by decades of posthumous research. Because the poet was an illegitimate child, his (possibly forged) birth certificate maintained an ambiguity about his parents. His mother was credited as Maria Theodorescu, who is known to have been married to a local Gendarme, Nae Theodorescu; the latter name appears under "father", but refers to another man of that name—namely, an Oltenian pastry cook from Târgu Cărbunești. Ion was always aware of his paternity, viewing himself as an Oltenian and maintaining close links with that town; he was resentful toward his actual mother, who was not Maria, but rather a Rozalia Ergézi or Arghesi, first mentioned as such in his vaccination certificate. She was a domestic servant and a Catholic, sometimes presenting herself as a German or generically Transylvanian. As uncovered in the 2010s by researcher István Ferenczes, she was a member of the Hungarian community, and more specifically a Székely immigrant, and was only "German", in popular perception, in that she was from Austria-Hungary and could speak (some) German. His maternal grandfather was a stonemason, János Ergézi of Szentegyháza (Vlăhița), through whom he traced his origins to the Székelys of Bukovina.

The poet had two half-brothers, Nicolae and Alexandru, respectively from Nae and Rozalia. Ion spent his first months in Rozalia's rented apartment. In his infancy, she was a wet nurse, and as such breastfed him along with Jean Alexandru Steriadi, the future painter, whom he once introduced as a "milk brother". Rozalia taught her son Hungarian, possibly after taking him for a few years to Szentegyháza, at their Hungarian relatives. He may have been briefly enlisted at a primary school in Romania, recalling that his teachers included historian Alexandru Odobescu—whom he remembered as "one of the most beautiful things I ever gazed upon". By his own admission, he did most of his early training outside formal schooling, at Brezoianu Church; when he finally enlisted at Bucharest's Cantemir School, aged eleven, he reportedly still switched between his two parental languages. He could still speak Hungarian with some fluency in the 1960s—though he remained vague about where he had learned it. He rarely saw his father, and in old age claimed that they had grown fully estranged from one another around 1891. According to multiple accounts, Ion preserved lifelong links with his mother, but never introduced her to his circle of friends, allowing it to be inferred that she was his housekeeper or a governess to his children. Though his pseudonym and eventual surname was a variant of his mother's Hungarian surname, he entertained confusion, once telling journalists that it was from the river Argeș.

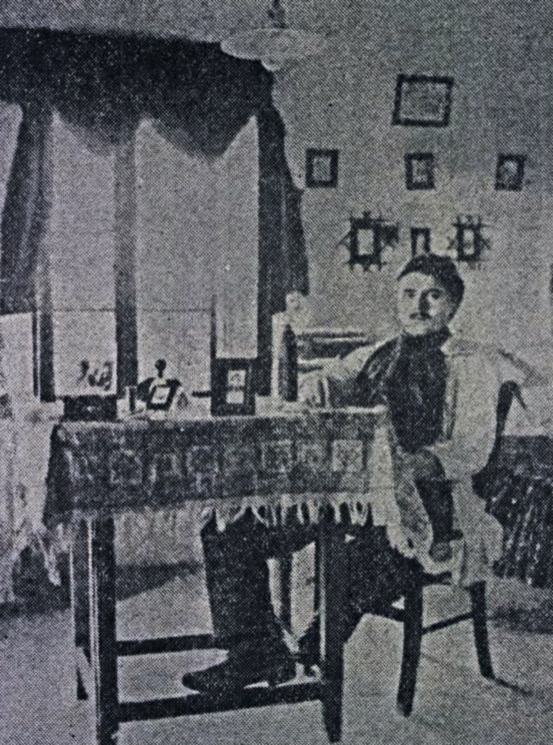
Young Theodorescu in 1898

Though he tutored other children for money from the age of eleven, Arghezi nearly flunked every year he spent at Cantemir, whence he eventually graduated in 1896; some early biographers view him as a graduate of Saint Sava, which is where his friend Gala Galaction was enlisted. Immediately after completing regular school, he became an apprentice stonemason in a funeral home. By his own account, his only diploma was that of a master typographer, on the basis of which he would later operate his own printing press. A schoolmate of Steriadi and Apcar Baltazar, he was passionate about drawing, and became a gifted if uncultivated artist (he continued to sketch in pencil during his entire career as a writer, and even sold some of his drawings). Theodorescu began writing poetry in 1894, originally to spite a colleague who had also taken up this occupation. He was pushed to read literature by two of his teachers, but also by his growing fascination toward bohemianism and what he understood to be a journalist's lifestyle.

As a subject of the newly proclaimed Kingdom of Romania, Arghezi took an interest in left-wing politics, and, possibly in early 1895, attended a rally at the socialist club, where he also met the culture critic Garabet Ibrăileanu; he sent some of his poetry to Lumea Nouă, a socialist magazine, which offered him encouragement without printing it. Immediately after, he pivoted toward the Symbolist movement, joining a circle of youths that worshiped poet Alexandru Macedonski. He made his debut as a published poet in Macedonski's magazine, Liga Ortodoxă, on 30 July 1896—still signing himself "Ion N. Theodorescu", or "Ion Theo". In October, the same magazine hosted his epigram against a senior traditionalist poet, George Coșbuc, later described by Arghezi himself as one of his most shameful writings.

It was in this context that Arghezi became close friends with two other aspiring socialist-and-Symbolist writers, namely Galaction and N. D. Cocea, as well as with Ion G. Duca, future Prime Minister of Romania. Though he received high praise from Macedonski, he resented the doyen's editorial intrusions in his poems, and left the circle around November 1896. His new patron was a landowner and political intriguer, Alexandru Bogdan-Pitești, to whom he dedicated a period poem, and for whom he curated an art exhibit (summer 1898); he was also hosted in Vieața Nouă, with a prose poem that he signed as "Th. Arghezzi", and with satirical pieces in Moș Teacă. In that context, he met the influential dramatist Ion Luca Caragiale, in what was initially a confrontational encounter. Caragiale took a liking to Arghezi, and asked to see his work, but the young man would not oblige him. By late 1898, he was a lab assistant at Chitila's sugar mill. Contrary to his preferred narrative, Arghezi was also growing very fond to his father, who had married a rich lady from Pitești, and had settled there as a bank clerk. Nae was annoyed when he caught glimpse of his son at a Symbolist coffeehouse, and decided to reduce his allowance.

=== Monk, rebel, watchmaker ===
Shortly after, Arghezi had decided to abandon his regular activities, and in February 1900 had taken orders at Cernica Monastery, with the name of "Iosif". By September, he was a Deacon and secretary to the Muntenian Orthodox Metropolis. In choosing this career path, he was fighting solitude and his resentments toward both his parents, while also seeking funds for continuing his secular education. He once explained that, before he entered Cernica, he had been effectively homeless. As "Iosif", young Theodorescu ingratiated himself to the Metropolitan, Iosif Gheorghian, and began reading profusely from his collection of French literature, discovering Gustave Flaubert. Gheorghian obtained him a position teaching comparative religion at the officers' school; at the time, he had not yet entered high school, but received Gheorghian's recommendation and passed his entry exam at Cliniciu–Popa Boys' Institute. He and Gheorghian also completed a translation of Henri Didon's Jésus Christ. It appeared in print in a heavily modified version, without their signatures.

Disappointed by monastery life, Arghezi folded back on his natural inclination toward anti-clericalism, and his satire of the priesthood became outstandingly mordant. Another factor that shaped Arghezi's attitudes on religion was his passionate love for a woman known only as "Lia"—for whom he wrote a poetic cycle, Agate negre ("Black Agates"). Nae and his son eventually reconciled in 1902, and Arghezi could continue to spend his father's money, including on a Harley-Davidson motorcycle. He was pursuing Aretia Panaitescu, an ethnic Greek girl with whom he exchanged love letters while still in the monastery. Possibly during one of his return trips to Pitești, he met schoolteacher Constanța Zissu, who was his senior by ten years, and whom he pursued while still courting Aretia. He impregnated Constanța in 1904, and she then left for Paris, giving birth to their son Eliazar Theodorescu, the future photographer and director "Eli Lotar". The boy was taken to Bucharest, and largely raised there by grandmother Rozalia.

A short-lived magazine (April–June 1904) called Linia Dreaptă had for its publishers Arghezi and novelist Vasile Demetrius. Here, the poet began using the definitive version of his pseudonym, as well as the other pen name, I. Gabriol, for polemical pieces targeting journalist George Panu, also printing a debut novella, Lotar. In Symbolist circles, the magazine was seen as ahead of its time, and its eventual disappearance as caused by a concerted effort from "gazettes of a very modest standing". Arghezi also worked briefly for Panait Mușoiu's anarchist journal, Revista Ideei, translating a poem by Maurice Magre. Despite his latent conflict with the church and his scandalous behavior, he obtained Metropolitan Gheorghian's recommendation to study theology at the University of Fribourg, as well as tuition funds from Nae Theodorescu and lump sums borrowed from richer friends—however, he had not yet passed his baccalaureate in Romania (he did so in 1905). He no longer considered himself a monk, and, to underscore that point, asked Cocea to cut off his overgrown locks, which he had worn in accordance to Orthodox customs. He left for Switzerland in 1905, spending his time in a convent of the Cordeliers, though he still wrote home to inquire about Eliazar.

It is likely that, while in Fribourg, Theodorescu familiarized himself thoroughly with the work of Blaise Pascal, which then colored his religious-themed poems. Unable to further his theological education, and facing bankruptcy, he enlisted at a Swiss vocational school and became a skilled watchmaker, going out for work in Switzerland and neighboring states. He was for a while in Geneva, fashioning pieces of jewellery, tending to a kitchen garden, and working as a railway porter. Here, he claimed to have met the Bolshevik leader Vladimir Lenin, future founder of the Soviet Union. While spending some time in Paris as a coal merchant, he educated himself as an attendee of Impressionist and Fauvist art shows, as well as of concerts at the Paris Opera, becoming a fan of Richard Wagner. He may have been employed as a permanent auditor by a traveling oncologist, who liked him for his listening skills. The experience put Arghezi in direct contact with so many patients that he claimed he could detect cancer by its "smell". Arghezi also talked of returning to Romania as a supplier of catgut, but was reportedly put off by the brutal quashing of a peasants' revolt in 1907 (his topical correspondence with the radicalized Cocea and Galaction was reportedly censored by Swiss authorities). He was remotely employed by Duca as a correspondent for Viitorul daily, but only contributed a few articles in late 1908.

Cocea had more success, making him a house poet at his own Viața Socială. Its first issue, appearing in February 1910, featured Arghezi's Rugă de seară ("Evening Prayer"), which made him into an instant celebrity. Pleased by this outcome, and also pressed by bureaucratic matters, Arghezi returned to Bucharest before the end of that year; in early 1911, he was a political columnist at Cocea's new venue, Facla, with pieces that he generally signed as "Bock" (but also as "Gabriol" or under his monastic name). He was Facla's art reviewer, inaugurating his columns with a panning of Nicolae Vermont. Theodorescu involved himself in religious affairs, defending Bishop Gherasim Safirin in his conflict with the Romanian Synod. In October 1911, the Synod stripped him of his position in the church (that of a Hierodeacon), and fully excluded him from monastic life. Also then, Arghezi became a professional writer, with articles for Cocea's Rampa, for Ibrăileanu's Viața Romînească, and for Ion Minulescu's Insula. He also translated Fyodor Dostoevsky's House of the Dead, and, with Theodor Cornel, penned a series of biographies for a Romanian dictionary.

=== "Germanophilia" years ===
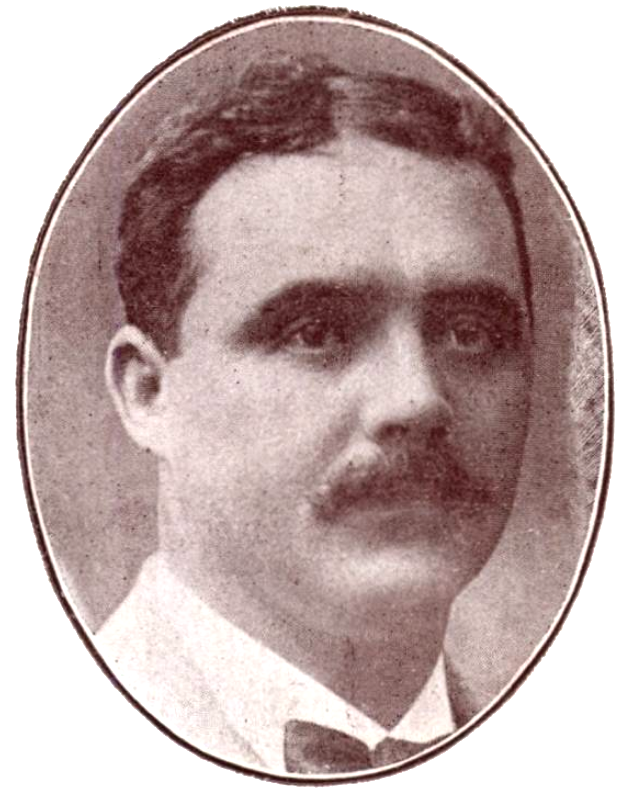
Arghezi in 1915

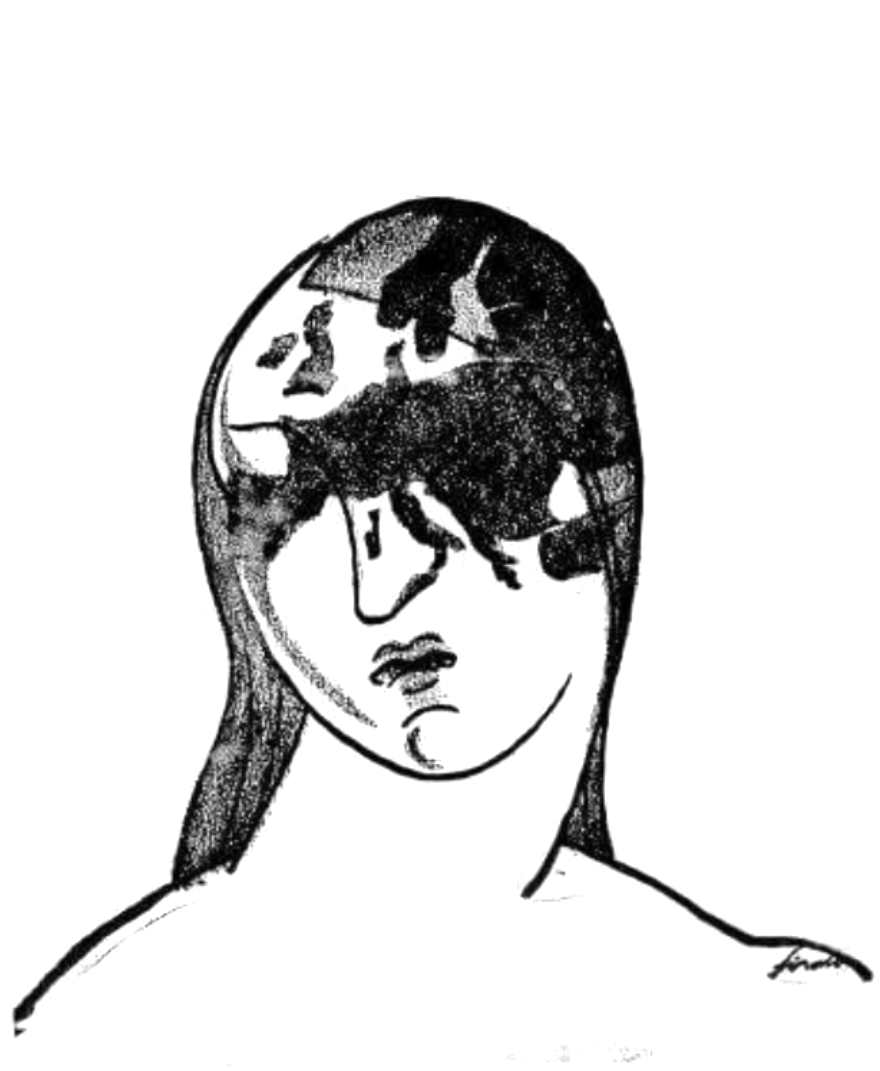
Francisc Șirato's "Ailing Earth", published in Cronica of May 1915

In late 1911, Arghezi's "Prologue", recited by Maria Giurgea, was used in the opening show at Comœdia Theater. According to reviewer Petre Locusteanu of Flacăra magazine, the work was exceptionally bad, and as such casually ignored by most critics. Admitted into the Romanian Writers' Society (SSR) in November of that year, Arghezi spent the next few months antagonizing its leadership, with articles directly targeting Dimitrie Anghel for his alleged nepotism. He was almost expelled, but then reconfirmed and elected to the SSR executive board. His conflict with the authors at Flacăra deepened, after these reprinted verse he had published in Viața Romînească to illustrate bad writing. Expressing his gratitude to Ibrăileanu, who had stood by him, he declared his intention of settling in Switzerland, but also indicated that he had written full volumes of unpublished poetry. In December 1912, he successfully proposed to Constanța; they were separated again soon after, and had divorced in February 1914, when Arghezi was also granted custody over Eliazar.

By 1913, Arghezi had been reunited with Bogdan-Pitești, who kept him on as editor and columnist of his new daily, Seara. His initial political stances, expanded upon during the Second Balkan War, included harsh criticism of the Habsburg monarchy, whom he viewed as malignant, and whom he accused of colluding with Bulgaria against Romania's interests. Arghezi's other activity at Seara was in literary and artistic promotion. Here, he helped launch the careers of Galaction, Emil Isac, Adrian Maniu, Eugeniu Ștefănescu-Est, and Ion Vinea; he also expanded on his mockery of academic art, demanding that Romanians familiarize themselves with modernists such as Jules Pascin, Ștefan Luchian, Dimitrie Paciurea and Constantin Brâncuși, whom he adored. He remained protective of Bogdan-Pitești's political agenda, defending his employer even as the latter was being sentenced for blackmail.

During early 1914, a firm based in the German Empire bought Seara, which immediately became engaged in propagandizing for the Central Powers. Arghezi espoused this editorial change, and, in March 1914, proposed that Romania needed to find herself on the same side as Austria, always against "barbaric" Russia. World War I broke out months after. Romania maintained her neutrality—a position endorsed by Arghezi, who now castigated supporters of the Entente powers; he quit Seara in October 1914, but only to launch his own weekly, Cronica, which also took up the "Germanophile" agenda. Here, he continued to host Symbolist writers, displaying what Crohmălniceanu labels as "discreet sympathy" toward their more and more frequent veering into avant-garde experimentation. The magazine also published his ink drawing of Galaction. From October 1915, he was also editor of a complementary literary newspaper, Libertatea, for which he also recruited Galaction. In March 1916, their association ended abruptly, because Arghezi had chosen to target Cocea in his satirical pieces.

Cronica published its last issue in July 1916, just before Romania had joined the Entente. He was drafted with the auxiliaries, then served briefly as a Gendarme during The Romanian Debacle, which saw southern Romania falling to the Central Powers. At the time, he was in an amorous relation with Paraschiva Burdea, an uneducated ethnic Romanian from the Duchy of Bukovina, whom he married on 5 November 1916; this decision stopped him from following the retreating armies all the way to Iași, which had been established as a provisional capital of a rump Romanian state. He was for a while undecided, and refused to publish for Germanophile papers such as Constantin Stere's Lumina. In May 1917, he agreed to function as editor at Gazeta Bucureștilor, which was directly controlled by the German occupiers. Therein, he published regular editorials, signing himself with his initials, or as "Sigma".

In November, Vasilis Dendramis, who, as a representative of the Greek Provisional Government, had reached Iași after a time in German captivity, informed the Ententist Romanians that: "Messrs Arghezi and Galaction will be printing illustrations and will be educating the public in line with the generous methods of the Teutonic Kultur." Arghezi's many articles were increasingly Anglophobic, which was an exotic take in the Romanian context, leading historian Lucian Boia to propose that he was slavishly borrowing the core slogans of German propaganda. As later noted by polemicist Petre Pandrea, Arghezi was "betting on eternal rule by the German troops", and as such was taking unnecessary risks. Pandrea also argues that this pattern of outrageous commitments was continued later in life, when Arghezi always seemed to be plagued by moral or material bankruptcy. In December 1917, Arghezi penned a series of article mocking the expectations of Romanian nationalism in regard to the annexation of Transylvania, and ridiculed Marie of Romania for having viewed herself as a future "empress" of Central Europe. He continued to reside in Bucharest during 1918, before and after the Iași government had sued for peace. He left Gazeta Bucureștilor for Alexandru Marghiloman's Steagul, being also irregularly featured in A. de Herz's Scena.

=== First imprisonment and return ===
During autumn 1918, Galaction put out two issues of an agrarianist review, Spicul ("Ear of Corn"), co-opting Arghezi and I. C. Vissarion as main contributors. In that context, as the Central Powers were suing for peace, Ion I. C. Brătianu became Prime Minister, at the helm of an Entente-aligned government centered on Bucharest. As one of his first measures, in addition to resuming war against the Central Powers, he ordered the mass arrest of Germanophile opinion-makers, who were dispatched to Văcărești Prison. Arghezi was among those taken into custody, and, to organize his time, began working on the prison garden. A fellow Germanophile inmate, Ioan Slavici, was perplexed by his meticulous self-grooming and his cheerfulness, noting that they were excessive and "embarrassing". Arghezi was at the time being court-martialled by the 3rd Army Corps, and in March 1919 sentenced to five years for "collaboration with the enemy"—with his articles for Gazeta Bucureștilor cited as the most incriminating evidence. His continuous petitioning resulted in his being granted a temporary reprieve, once he indicated that he needed to relocate Eliazar, who had run away from home. The boy was revealing himself as psychologically disturbed, with frequent fugue states.

An official decree, liberating Arghezi alongside all other Germanophile journalists still in custody, was promulgated on 31 December 1919 by King Ferdinand. As Boia notes, it came about as a result of pressures from the Transylvanian-centered Romanian National Party, which had taken power away from Brătianu and Duca's National Liberal Party (PNL). A nationalist and Ententist historian, Nicolae Iorga, is widely credited as the person most responsible for setting Arghezi free. Upon returning to civilian life, Arghezi still voiced occasional criticism of the Ententist option, suggesting that Greater Romania had only been afforded international recognition because the international players had wanted control over the "black gold" of her oil industry. He was welcomed by Hiena magazine, working under Cezar Petrescu. In August 1920, it featured his obituary for the Ententist Constantin Mille, attacking the deceased in terms that were borderline obscene; also at Hiena, he published draft versions of poems such as "Ion Ion" and Vraciul.

In 1921, Arghezi agitated for the release of a Socialist Party activist, who had been arrested during a workers' strike. He was allowed to switch sides in early 1922, turning into a political client of the PNL—as editor of the party-affiliated paper, Cuget Românesc. By his own account, he was paying off "a debt to the party that had kept me at Văcărești", and happened to see his views on international affairs aligned with Brătianu's. His activity at that gazette alternated translations from Charles Baudelaire, viewed as excellent even by his political adversaries, and homages to the Brătianu family, which seemed excessive even to his contemporaries. In later years, he regarded this association as embarrassing, describing his employers as impostors. He once tried to get out of his contract: he was at Timișoara in September 1922, hoping (but eventually failing) to establish a Romanian daily in that formerly Austro-Hungarian city; for two months in 1923, he single-handedly put out Națiunea newspaper, for which he penned his recollections of life at Cernica. Also then, he was regularly featured with satirical pieces in Contimporanul, which also focused on promoting him as a poet. As an occasional dramaturge for Marioara Voiculescu's troupe, he translated a medical-themed play called Avariații.

During his time at Cuget Românesc, Arghezi discovered, curated and published the avant-garde stories of a suicidal clerk known as "Urmuz", texts which shaped the history of Romanian modernism in the interwar and after. His own writings included an introduction to Urmuz's life and meticulous writing process. As a literary chronicler, he expressed controversial opinions, such as when he lambasted Liviu Rebreanu for his breakthrough novel, Ion. This incident led the general public to assume that the two writers were bitter rivals, but they continued to have friendly correspondence down to Rebreanu's death. Arghezi claimed to have been ultimately fired by a vengeful Brătianu, after he and Ion Pillat had published criticism of the leadership in what was effectively the party paper. In 1924–1925, he was mainly active at Lumea Bazar, put out by George Topîrceanu (who welcomed him there with a sympathetic portrait in prose). His own articles were often self-reflexive—discussing a writer's craft and praising the lampoon as a masterpiece of the human intellect; also featured was Morgenstimmung, seen by critic Ioana Pârvulescu as "one of the most beautiful love poems of the interwar", which he originally signed as "Grieg". He was a theatrical reviewer for the 1925 edition of a left-leaning journal, Cuvântul Liber.

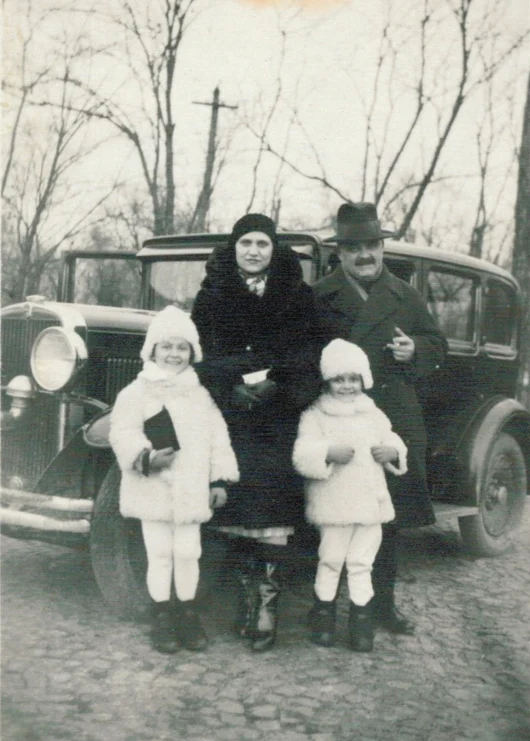
Arghezi with wife Paraschiva and children Mitzura and Baruțu, c. 1930

In February 1925, Arghezi announced that he was collecting money for a five-volume collection of his poetry and prose, but was forced to delay this project due to insufficient contributions. His secluded life was punctuated by incidents: in January 1924, his entire wardrobe was ransacked by unknown thieves, and he only relied on a covert coat to walk about in winter, down to at least 1926. He managed to buy land in southern Bucharest, outside his former prison, where he slowly built himself a mansion that became known as Mărțișor. He argued that this was a solution to all of life's ills, as well as a way to bypass the PNL-controlled banks, and invited other colleagues to follow his lead in setting up a new "citadel of writers". His optimistic view was contrasted by reality, and he had to greatly intensify his activity in order to pay for the building and its upkeep. His family increased: Paraschiva gave birth to his daughter, Domnica "Mitzura", in 1924, and then to a son, Iosif "Baruțu", in 1925. Rozalia also lived at Mărțișor, as did Nae Theodorescu's Greek widow, who acted as Mitzura's tutor. By that time, Eliazar had left the family home, breaking off almost all contact with Arghezi Sr.

=== Cuvinte potrivite era ===
The poetry collection Cuvinte potrivite ("Suited Words") was announced in 1926 by I. Valerian's journal, Viața Literară, which also published an anticipatory essay of praise, authored by Arghezi's "foremost admirer", Șerban Cioculescu. Finally appearing in May 1927, the volume received "unusual praise from a majority of the critics" (Eugen Simion), marking his "reception as a great poet" (Boia). New supporters included the culture critic Mihai Ralea, who was probably the first to declare that Arghezi was in all respects equal to the national poet, Mihai Eminescu, "an artist even when he cusses." Though widely read and admired, Cuvinte potrivite was regarded as exceptionally poor and alarming writing by Iorga. He proceeded to attack Arghezi over several issues of Neamul Românesc paper, and, in a later overview, described the book as "comprising all of what is most repulsive in concept and most trivial in shape". Obstruction by Iorga and other traditionalists (among them Gheorghe Bogdan-Duică) resulted in his losing the national prize for poetry to a more conventional Alfred Moșoiu. Arghezi himself was infuriated by this sabotage, but opted not to respond with insults, stating that he owed Iorga "eternal gratitude". In tandem, he found himself criticized by the liberal modernist Eugen Lovinescu, who, as an Ententist, could not tolerate the poet's wartime pronouncements. As observed by Cioculescu, Lovinescu only joined the "new critics", those who believed in Arghezianism as a literary upgrade, "after prolonged hesitation". Lovinescu himself once summarized his view on Arghezi's duality as an amoral figure, whose verse was truly revolutionary, but whose art was entirely devoid of "faith or creed".

Establishing his own magazine, Bilete de Papagal, in February 1928, Arghezi claimed to have broken a record for the "smallest printed sheet". Though minuscule in format, this publication was praised by Arghezi's supporters for having "launched modern journalism in our country". Here, he began using various pen names, most often identifying with his alter ego "Coco the Parrot". Specifically designing this new venue for attracting and steering young disciples, he extended a somewhat jocular challenge, promising that he would readily publish their most unhinged texts (the promise was kept, and the series began with surrealistic fragments by the esotericist Ionathan X. Uranus). He also hosted Topîrceanu with a parody of Cuvinte potrivite, that included a direct jibe at Arghezi himself—though he vetted it for print, he introduced it with a note that Cioculescu describes as "rather sullen". Bilete continued to host his own musings on life, including one article which evidenced his agnosticism, his enduring search for meaning, and his respect for one's authentic religiosity. The magazine was instantly rejected by old nationalist rivals, especially after it began hosting posthumous mockery of writers such as Mihail Săulescu. In 1930, the increasingly right-wing Nichifor Crainic published in Gândirea a piece that reminded Romanians of Arghezi's "desertion to the enemy", suggesting that his moral sickness was directed against "anything that's holy".

In March 1929, Arghezi also agreed to become a regular writer for the Oltenian magazine Ramuri, upon the invitation extended by Constantin Șaban Făgețel. The Cernica memoirs also appeared that year, as a bound volume called Icoane de lemn ("Icons on Wood"). They were immediately condemned as immoral by the Synod, an accusation which saw Arghezi upheld as a hero by the far-leftist paper Proletarul. A rapid succession of Arghezian works followed: his novel Poarta neagră ("Black Gate") was printed in 1930, while more poetry came as Flori de mucigai ("Mildew Flowers", 1931), alongside the children's book Cartea cu jucării ("Book of Toys"); he then printed two other novels—Tablete din Țara de Kuty ("Tabloids from the Land of Kuty", 1933) and Ochii Maicii Domnului ("Eyes of the Theotokos", 1934). He also ventured into other genres, as with the 1934 book of crosswords, co-authored with Nicolae Popescu-Rebus; Prințul ("The Prince") is described by contemporaries as one of Arghezi's first monarchist political poems—likely expressing reverence toward Carol Caraiman, who had been forced to renounce his succession to the Romanian throne. By 1931, when Carol had returned as king, Arghezi was fully re-positioned himself as an enemy of the PNL establishment. He now rallied with the group's dissident wing, organized as the Georgist Liberal Party, and was a regular at its paper, Mișcarea; as Pandrea reports, the enterprise was doomed from the start, with the recruitment standing as additional proof that Arghezi had little political flair.

Arghezi continued to be featured in the leading magazines of his day, and returned with new collections of verse: Poezii ("Poems") in 1934, Cărticică de seară ("Evening Booklet") in 1935. He was a direct beneficiary of Carol's patronage: in late 1930, the returning monarch agreed to transfer him funds from his own civil list, which Arghezi then used on liquidating an outstanding debt. Some three years later, Carol established his own Royal Foundation, which was effectively a publishing house managed by Alexandru Rosetti; Arghezi's Versuri ("Verse") was among the first books to be sponsored by this project, also winning Carol's national literary prize for 1934 (which came with 100,000 lei). Around then, Rosetti sampled Arghezi's poems in a schoolbook, which sparked immediate indignation. As literary scholar Eugen Negrici notes, the move was "violently attacked" as a betrayal of national ideals. Later in the interwar, only one of his poems was vetted for integration into the regular curriculum. Almost simultaneously, Arghezi found himself censured by young modernizers such as Eugène Ionesco. Though discovered and published by Arghezi in 1928, Ionesco turned against his mentor in the 1934 essay, Nu, mocking Arghezian poetry as melodramatic and superficial. Ionesco himself later dismissed this contribution as "mere literary entertainment" of an experimental nature, while others labeled it "sophistic".

By then, Arghezi was also engaged in a latent conflict with the Iron Guard, which was emerging as Romania's most important fascist and antisemitic movement. In December 1933, his friend Duca, having taken over as Prime Minister, decided to ban the Guard, and was promptly assassinated by its Nicadori death squad. Arghezi responded to these developments in Adevărul Literar și Artistic, noting that the killing had served no social category and no ideological purpose. He demanded a national soul-searching, and made comments suggesting that academic Nae Ionescu was directly responsible for the violence. Immediately after, he reunited with Cocea in publicizing an appeal for the liberation of political prisoners—but their text was almost exclusively about members of the similarly outlawed Romanian Communist Party (PCR). Iorga, meanwhile, was greatly upset by Versuri and its royal imprimatur, inaugurating a new campaign against Arghezi. In 1936, he successfully blocked Lovinescu's induction by the Romanian Academy, in what he believed would be a message sent to Arghezi and the other modernists. He was dedicating entire issues of his review Cuget Clar to the sole purpose of excoriating Arghezi. A younger poet, Ion Caraion, suggests that this was a "tactical error", since the often "vulgar [and] untalented" articles, written "in bad faith", only got him more interested in Arghezian verse.

Iorga and his associate Nicolae Georgescu-Cocoș soon came to be ridiculed on the right as well. One of their conservative competitors, Constantin Argetoianu, noted with detachment that "people get bored" of the manufactured scandal, adding: "The way he writes, with all his anarchic senses, one still finds formidable lines in [Arghezi's poems]. I would not exchange two lines by Arghezi for 800 of Iorga's volumes." Farther on the right, the Gândirea group and its satellite Sfarmă-Piatră operated a distinction between the recent Arghezi, branded a "pornographer", and the older version of the poet, whom, they argued, was essentially a respectable traditionalist; from within this camp, Vintilă Horia regarded Arghezi as corrupted by his Jewish associates. A similar claim was stated by poet Nicolae Davidescu, who discussed Arghezi as "Jewified". Arghezi announced that he was seeking "justice among right-wingers", and, as a result maintained a close friendship with poet Octavian Goga, who was leader of the National Agrarian Party. He had fond memories of Goga, who once brought him purebred chickens for farming at Mărțișor.

=== Carlist protegé ===
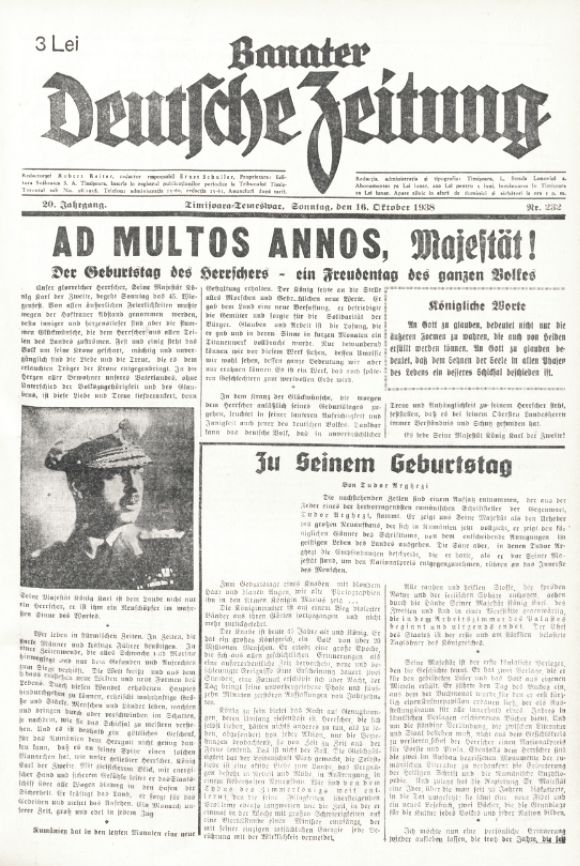
The Banater Deutsche Zeitung, a newspaper of the Banat Swabians, celebrating Carol II's birthday in October 1937, with editorial by Arghezi

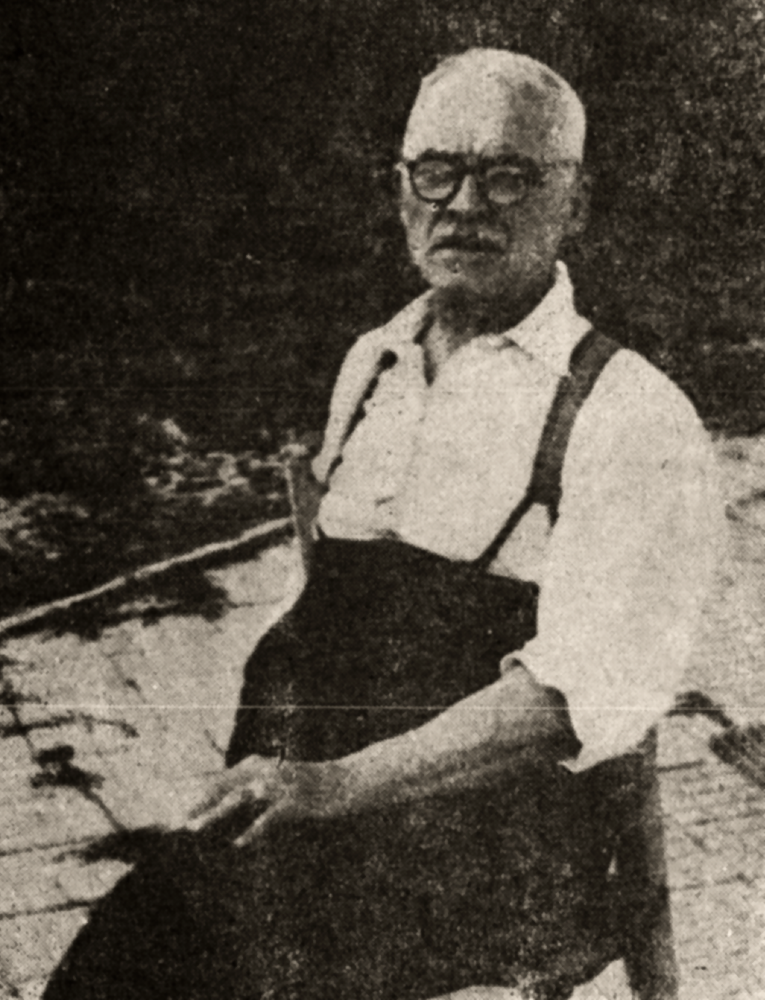
Arghezi at Mărțișor, in May 1940

In the midst of this national controversy, Arghezi put out the fantasy novel Cimitirul Buna-Vestire ("Annunciation Cemetery", 1936) and a 1937 collection of prose poems, Ce-ai cu mine, vântule? ("Wind, Why Do You Trouble Me?"). Also then, he relaunched Bilete, specifically to mount the counterattack against Iorga. In one of its issues, he also provided a belated response to Nichifor Crainic, whom he depicted as a sycophant. Iorga's adversaries in the field of historical science also watched the scandal unfolding. One of them, Constantin C. Giurescu, privately rejoiced that Bilete had hosted Arghezi's equally violent replies to Iorga. On 5 June 1937, Carol appeared in front of the Academy and gave a speech which censured Iorga, implicitly elevating Arghezi to the status of poet laureate.

This full embrace was short-lived: the following year, Carol staged a self-coup, proclaimed an authoritarian constitution, and moved toward creating his sole official party, a "National Renaissance Front" (FRN). During early 1938, Bilete was suppressed by the king's new censorship apparatus; also then, the right-wing Cuvântul obtained Arghezi's brief collaboration, but only as an art columnist. In 1939, he stated his comeback as a poet with a selection of Hore (the plural of hora). It was dedicated to an industrialist, Nicolae Malaxa (a matter which various of Arghezi's contemporaries viewed as embarrassing for his reputation), and contained satirical lines targeting Iorga as Moș Pârțag ("Old Man Pique"). Arghezi worked with his friend Mihai Ralea, who was serving as the FRN Minister of Labor, on legislation regulating pensions and benefits for professional writers, and in doing so endorsed Carlist censorship, by accepting that writers could be bought off.

For most of 1939, the author was immobilized by a mysterious affliction, which puzzled the medical corps and was for a while known as the "Tudor Arghezi disease". It was described as a serious form of sciatica, but was more fully reported as a suppurating spondylosis of the lower back, with pyelonephritis and a related bone abscess, originating as a urinary tract infection. He was disappointed with the various physicians who tended to him, including the specialist Dumitru Bagdasar—who treated him for cancer, using radiation therapy—and the young specialist George Emil Palade. Arghezi doubted the diagnosis, claiming instead to have "smelled" Bagdasar's own untreated cancer. He also believed that his lingering disease was only cured by a secret injection from a newcomer, Dumitru Grigoriu-Argeș, whom physician C. D. Zeletin descrubes as an "extravagant character and obviously histrionic, but a good rheumatologist." In other contexts, Arghezi claimed that his writer friend I. C. Vissarion had healed him with the power of prayer. He then elevated Grigoriu-Argeș's image as the only doctor with a professional conscience, and openly rejoiced when Bagdasar died in 1946; investigations carried out in 1955 reported that he actually owed his improvement to Bagdasar's methods, despite his misdiagnosis.

After World War II had broken out in 1939, Arghezi was somewhat critical of the FRN. In a discussion with Cristian Sârbu and other young poets of the Adonis circle, he claimed to have mocked the series of army mobilizations by a still-neutral Romania, since he viewed the military commanders as expanding their opportunity for graft. This resulted in his being visited by a general, who demanded that he present proof of his claims; Arghezi obliged him by printing a fake classified ad for an overpriced villa, and receiving offers to buy from a long list of sub-officers. In 1940, which also witnessed Baruțu's own beginnings as a typographer and writer, Arghezi Sr was a prominent participant in Carol's personality cult, with encomia that spoke of his having descended from the skies to rescue his people. That year, his entire activity as a journalist only covered three articles, all of which were about Carol. The FRN regime crumbled soon after it had enraged Romanians, Arghezi included, by agreeing to withdraw its administration from Bessarabia and northern Bukovina, which were then annexed by the Soviet Union.

=== With and against Antonescu ===
A short while after Romania had also lost Northern Transylvania to Hungary, power was taken by General Ion Antonescu, in partnership with the Iron Guard—inaugurating what became known as a "National Legionary State", before aligning Romania with Nazi Germany and the other Axis powers. In October 1941, the poet was still celebrated in Timpul newspaper by Mircea Streinul, who discussed his "overwhelming influence" on Romanian literature, as Eminescu's legatee. In November, Arghezi was among those who first learned about the Guard mass-murdering old-regime politicians, also informing a horrified Rebreanu of this turn of events. He reportedly shed tears for Iorga, killed by the Guardists in a parallel incident, now acknowledging that his old enemy had been a genius and a guide for his people. The Siguranța secret police placed him under constant surveillance in January 1941, but his case worker could only report that he was recovering from an illness and would not leave Mărțișor.

Following a civil war in January 1941, Antonescu suppressed the Guard, and soon found Arghezi among his committed supporters. Antonescu also tightened the dictatorship around his person. Still partnered with the Axis, he directed Romanian participation in the invasion of the Soviet Union. Arghezi followed the new political commands, expressing joy over the reconquest of Bessarabia. His enthusiasm was seen as exaggerated by psychologist Nicolae Mărgineanu, who implied that Arghezi was his usual "scoundrel" (lichea). Arghezi reacted with indifference, inviting Mărgineanu to move to England in his search for upstanding moralists. A three-poem cycle, published in 1941 by Revista Fundațiilor Regale, was sometimes read as regime-friendly and anti-Soviet messaging on the Bessarabian question, but may also be, in an entirely opposite reading, about the Nazi hold on Romania. In August, Arghezi backed the restoration of Romanian rule in Bukovina, with an article for that same magazine; the entire issue doubled as an Antonescu Festschrift. He was more explicit in other articles and poems he wrote for Revista Fundațiilor Regale, as well as for Timpul, where he suggested that Bolshevism stood to be "quashed". He also vented his feelings about Soviet rule in Bessarabia in prefacing a 1941 book by war reporter Constantin Virgil Gheorghiu, though his text was vague, and shied away from validating Gheorghiu's politics. The Antonescu regime decided to reciprocate: in an official critical anthology proposed by Alexandru Busuioceanu, Guardist and Jewish authors were to be equally expunged, while Arghezi was to receive systematic praise. In December, he had prepared a new novel, Lina, but the military censors refused to approve it for print. Their objections were finally vetoed by a civilian censor, Constantin Vișoianu.

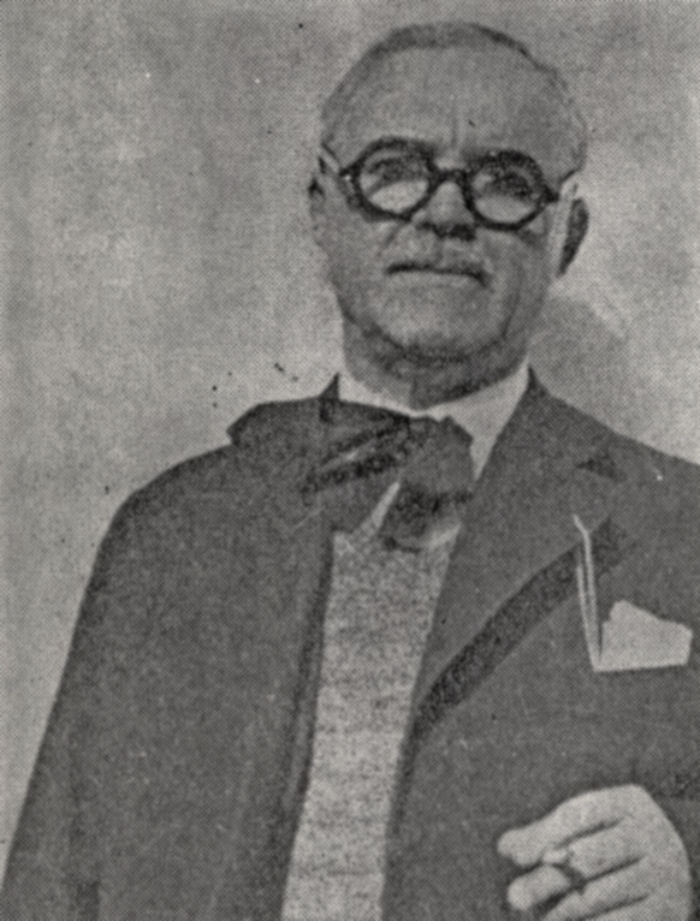
Arghezi's portrait in early 1942, also used on his press card at Informația Zilei

In early 1942, while touring Germany, Rebreanu spoke of Arghezi as one of the greatest poets in the country. At home, the editors of Vremea sponsored lectures at the Romanian Atheneum, and Arghezi was invited to share his thoughts on Eminescu's poetry. Eyewitness accounts suggest that he had endured as a popular figure: though mediocre as a public speaker, he had filled all seats. His printing press at Mărțișor was now fully operational, but Lina was taken up by a regular publishing house, Cartea Românească, in May 1942, and was reportedly an instant bestseller. At the time, he was writing for Duminica weekly, but withdrew after disagreements with editor Traian T. Lalescu; the latter decided to make a final profit from their collaboration by openly advertising the "departure", hawking the news to make it seem like Arghezi may have died. The latter made efforts to revive Bilete de Papagal, applying for a publication permit; his case was personally handled by the Deputy Premier, Mihai Antonescu, who refused to grant permission. Caraion, who met Arghezi after producing a sympathetic review of Lina in Timpul, recalls that he was becoming critical of the regime, and looked forward to its toppling.

Arghezi moved on to Informația Zilei, a daily founded by Emil Serghie; according to Pandrea, the latter had been arrested by the Antonescu regime so that his paper could become an unofficial voice of government. Its new manager was a theologian friend, Grigore Malciu. He obtained Arghezi's permanent collaboration with an independent column that was effectively a fourth and penultimate series of Bilete de Papagal. It was inaugurated in April 1943, around the time when Mitzura was debuting as a visual artist with a critically acclaimed show. Bilete allegedly made Malciu's paper into a best-selling publication, albeit one that often had to be circulated clandestinely to circumvent censorship laws. The terminally ill Lovinescu, having been persuaded that Romania's alliance with Germany was strategically sound, was also reconsidering his critique of Arghezi's Germanophile past. In May 1943, Arghezi addressed him a public letter of admiration; Lovinescu was brought to tears by this gesture of solidarity, and responded with a similar homage to the poet.

At Malciu's paper, he now tested the limits of Antonescian censorship—a piece called Voinicul ("Big Fella") resulted in his detainment for a 24-hour period. Arghezi himself later acknowledged that the text was subversive, but rejected claims that it was an homage to the Jewish community leader, Wilhelm Filderman. Baroane ("Thou Baron"), carried by Informația Zilei of 30 September 1943, was Arghezi's thinly veiled attack on the German ambassador, Manfred von Killinger, whom he portrayed as Romania's colonial master. The work is said to have been received with "immense satisfaction" by the general public, carrying "the significance of a national mandate". The paper was temporarily banned, and the author subjected to interrogations by Antonescu's police. He denied that the text was about Killinger, claiming to have had in mind a Hungarian baron out of Transylvania. Swiss ambassador René de Weck, who kept a political diary, dismissed Arghezi's "alibi" as "see-through", and speculated that he had either had support from the military censors, or that these censors were incompetent. Pandrea contends that Baroane was commissioned by the Romanian regime, which had a behind-the-scenes conflict with the German envoys. The claim was partly backed by the writer and censor Romulus Dianu, who later confessed: "I fought for his article Baroane to be published and made it so that it was". Arghezi himself did not fully endorse such claims, but observed that the censors were generally anti-war themselves, openly listening to Radio Londres and asking him for autographs. In one version of these events, the text was a response to statements made by Baron Kemény, the Hungarian Foreign Minister, but ended up conflating Kemény and Killinger; these hints infuriated Mihai Antonescu, but only because his own approval had not been sought.

=== Internee and fellow traveler ===
Immediately after, Arghezi was transported to the Târgu Jiu internment camp. The poet himself saw his deportation as a "logical consequence" of his action, observing that the Romanian regime could not have acted otherwise. Elsewhere, he reflected on it as a form of protective custody, effectively preventing him from being captured, and likely liquidated, by the Gestapo. He was detained for three months, and, throughout that time, continued to draw in his pension from the SSR, asking for it to be redirected to his family. He was allowed to write his verse, including Într'un județ ("In Some County"), which was transparently about the decimation of Romanian soldiers on the Eastern Front. He spent more time on a play which mocked Romania's physicians, from his accumulated frustration with the 1939 incident, calling it Seringa ("The Syringe"). He reportedly presented it to Rebreanu, then-head of the National Theater Bucharest (TNB). The text was vetted by the camp commander, Șerban Leoveanu, who wrote that it contained "nothing suspicious". Arghezi's friend Valeriu Anania claims that Rebreanu feared using it, owing to Arghezi's status as an enemy of the regime; this account is disputed by literary historian Stelian Cincă.

In December 1943, Gorjanul paper hosted a short reportage regarding the erection of a chapel in the internment camp—it was signed as "Alfa", who was later identified as inmate Arghezi. Throughout his time in custody, he was discreetly assisted by C. Ș. Făgețel, who had welcomed him into the Oltenian Writers' Association. He was eventually released after an Antonescian minister, General Dimitrie I. Popescu, intervened in his favor, and was immediately allowed to catch a train to Bucharest. He was at Mărțișor during Allied carpet-bombing in April 1944, witnessing as various of his neighbors and Văcărești detainees had been killed or maimed. He decried the devastation wrought by the "iron birds" in a series of poems known as Carnet ("Notebook"). He left the area and went into refuge in June, but, upon his return, decided that he would no longer fear for his life. During mid-August 1944, the Arghezis were again braving the raids—Arghezi Sr decided that he would not return to the air raid shelter, viewing it as "squalid and anarchic". He noted the flurry of anti-Antonescu activity by the National Peasants' Party, but mocked it. Just days after, an anti-Nazi coup toppled Antonescu, briefly reinstating democracy. He witnessed the events alongside Malciu, publishing his impressions in Informația Zilei. The newspaper was reissued on 29 August with a note (probably by Arghezi) announcing that, for the previous week, the censorship apparatus had been in place, with the same "reactionary" personnel as under Antonescu, but with new official agendas.

In December 1944, Arghezi began reissuing Bilete de Papagal as a standalone magazine or newspaper. He and Malciu prepared this relaunch with an intense publicity campaign, in which Arghezi depicted himself as the "only man of courage" to have acted against Nazism. Though published under contract with the PNL's own Viitorul, it now had a leftist agenda. Bilete attacked Antonescians such as Ion Petrovici, and gave some positive assessment to the PCR, praising Lucrețiu Pătrășcanu. Overall, however, it supported the non-communist Prime Minister, Nicolae Rădescu, just as the latter was beginning his showdown with the PCR. The editor himself was interviewed by Ion Biberi in January 1945, expressing his fears that the world had lost its "ideal form" and would never recover it. Faced with a growing and monopolizing PCR, Bilete suspended itself on 15 February. Officially, this was because its printers at Viitorul had been forced to shut down their enterprise, but effectively the PCR intervened to prevent the magazine from ever reappearing.

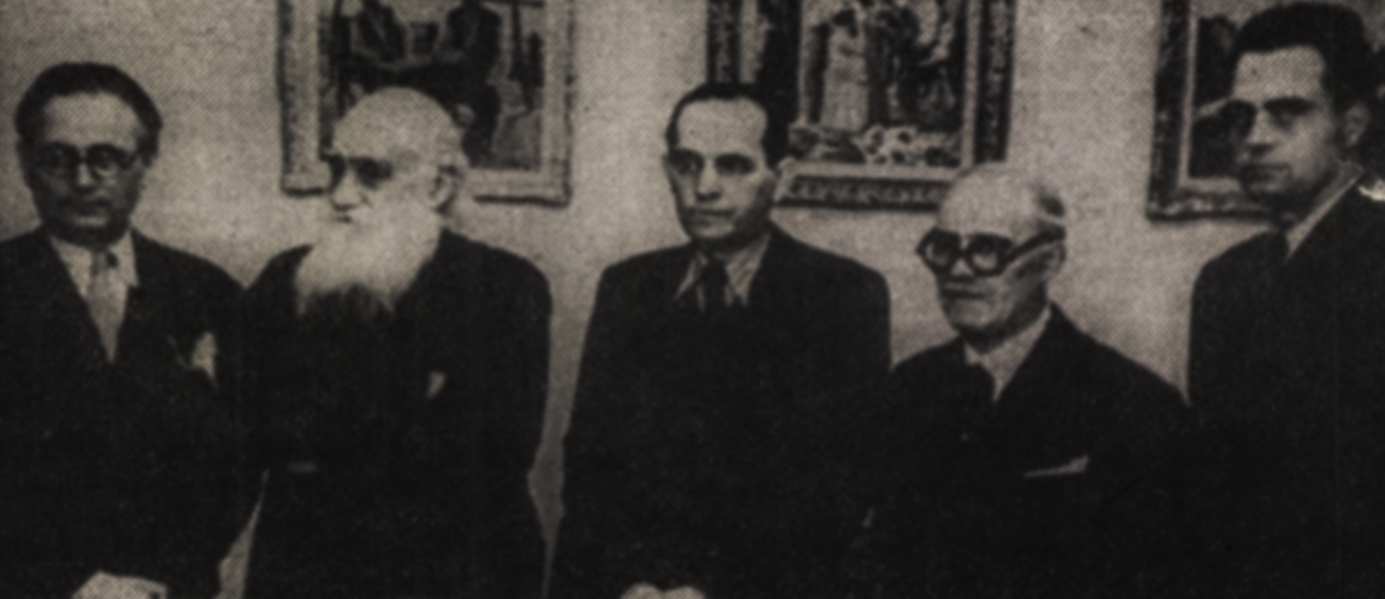
Writers participating in the celebration of Arghezi and Gala Galaction's 50 years in literature (held at the Romanian Atheneum). From the left: Ștefan Tita, Galaction, Ion Pas, Arghezi, and Zaharia Stancu

The party still made efforts to enlist Arghezi as a fellow traveler. He was awarded the national poetry prize (in August 1945), reportedly as a last-minute choice against the communist hardliner, Alexandru Toma, whom his own colleagues regarded as unfit for such honors. He accepted the award, but then publicly complained, to his patrons' annoyance, that it was only worth 18 US dollars in 1945 currency. Also then, the PCR newspaper, Scînteia, featured his memoir of his encounter with Henri Barbusse. Art critic Radu Bogdan, who commissioned and collected the text, recalls that it had to be heavily edited to remove all of Arghezi's own subtle mockery of communist literature; also according to Bogdan, Arghezi and his two Romanian children were fully supportive of the "Anglo-Americans". In December, the Arts Ministry, then under Ion Pas, celebrated Arghezi and Galaction on their fiftieth year as writers. In May 1946, the PCR Agitprop department still claimed "the great Tudor Arghezi" as a sympathizer of the cause, and promised to provide for him and his family. In one private meeting, novelist Mihail Sadoveanu, who had already embarked on a partnership with the communists, tried to persuade him not to write "as you have a way of doing", effectively warning him not to oppose the party. In September, Arghezi and Sadoveanu appeared together at the Romanian Society for Friendship with the Soviet Union, joined in welcoming the visiting author Ilya Ehrenburg.

=== Clash with the communists ===
Arghezi laughed off other communist advances, making his feelings clear in opposition newspapers—and, unlike Cocea and Galaction, made a point of never again writing for communist ones. His output for 1946 included Versuri alese ("Collected Verse") and the prose of Manual de morală practică ("Manual of Practical Morals"). In May of that year, he appeared as a defense witness for General Popescu, who was being tried by the People's Tribunal. He was regularly featured with short texts in Adevărul between April 1946 and December 1947. According to Cerna-Rădulescu, these were observational and non-satirical, but, as critic and communist militant Ovid S. Crohmălniceanu notes, they still included discreet jabs at adversaries on the left. At least one such text, published in June 1946, presented as a veiled protest against the Antonescus' execution by firing squad. He was still entirely silent when it came to either Rădescu's toppling by the PCR and to the rigged election of November 1946, but hinted at repressive policies when defending freedom of speech.

Received with indignation by the physicians' corps, Seringa was initially toned down to where the regular public could no longer enjoy it, then withdrawn after lackluster performances. That year, Arghezi could still publish Una sută una poeme ("101 Poems"). Contrary to popular legend, it was still tolerated by the authorities, sampled in the PCR journal Contemporanul, and sold well. In early 1947, Seringa was taken up by the TNB, whose new leader was Zaharia Stancu. The latter had been received into the leftist establishment, and cultivated Arghezi—although Arghezi himself despised him, alleging that he had spied on him and others for the Siguranța during the previous regimes. Arghezi was first proposed for an Academy membership in May of that year, but immediately rejected by its still-conservative majority, who viewed him as a pornographer.

Communist writer Mihai Beniuc reports that Arghezi had also been approached by the rival National Peasantists, and had rejected communism, which had seemed to be "his path in life"—Arghezi allegedly told Stancu that he now wanted "to roam and to bite". In March 1947, on behalf of the PCR, poet Miron Radu Paraschivescu singled out the senior poet as a political suspect; as reported as early as 1980 by Arghezian disciple Alexandru Cerna-Rădulescu, it inaugurated a chain of excoriations that prepared Arghezi's ultimate ban. A personal conflict between Arghezi and another communist writer, Nicolae Moraru, stoked the controversy. Just weeks after the book launch, Contemporanul hosted a castigation by Traian Șelmaru, reportedly urged on by a PCR supervisor, Silviu Brucan. Șelmaru was thus the first author to regard Arghezi as a politically useless "decadent". Scînteia editor Sorin Toma (Alexandru Toma's son) was then called up for the most virulent and most publicized denunciation, condemning Arghezi as not just decadent, but also as the "pathogenic agent" of an "agonizing class", with poetic ideas seemingly "fabricated in the loony bin." Aside from the ideological content, the piece may have stood for a family and clique interest. As Cerna-Rădulescu notes, the image of "healthy" writing was illustrated by Toma Sr's "tortured and limp poetry"; the junior's attack, he notes, was always rejected by "the more authentic side" of Romania's intellectual class. Other commentators similarly describe Toma Sr as at least partly responsible for the clash and its consequences.

The "Tămădău Affair" of 1947, which saw the National Peasants' Party framed for treason, accelerated repression. Arghezi appeared as a witness at the Peasantists' trial, and refrained from any statement that would have helped the prosecutors. While Arghezi's rendition of Molière's Misanthrope had gone into production at the TNB, communist censors stepped in, confiscating all copies of Una sută una poeme and relegating all Arghezian books from public libraries to a "secret fund". Such acts were celebrated in January 1949 by the head of Agitprop, Leonte Răutu, who took credit for having eliminated Arghezi from public life. As chair of the Romanian Writers' Union (USR), Stancu also turned against his friend, declaring him an exponent of "the 50-year-long domination of decadence over poetry". In March 1949, Malciu was arrested and moved between prisons, ultimately dying in 1950 at a labor camp on the Danube–Black Sea Canal. Meanwhile, Baruțu had been expelled from the University of Bucharest and spent most of 1948 as a political prisoner of the communist regime. He owned his freeing to interventions made by two PCR potentates, namely Ana Pauker and Teohari Georgescu.

For years on end, Arghezi himself was banned from publishing. In 1951–1952, only two of his texts could obtain imprimatur, both of them carried by the moribund Universul. He was also allowed to print, in book form, collaborative translations from Russian literature: Aleksandr I. Kuprin's Moloch, Ivan Krylov's fables, and Mikhail Saltykov-Shchedrin's collected stories. To survive, he had to sell produce from his own home, being almost pressed into selling Mărțișor. He relied again on handouts from friends such as George Călinescu, who was making a point of disobeying PCR commands on this issue; he was also being sponsored, semi-clandestinely, by novelists Dumitru Corbea and Paul Anghel, who ran the USR Literary Fund. Arghezi remained unwavering in his mockery of regime figures such as Sadoveanu, whom he despised. Around 1951, having heard that Sadoveanu had suffered a stroke, he asked if it was true that "Sadoveanu's eye dropped into his mouth". As reported by his son, he would continuously write anti-communist texts that he would then burn in his chimney.

=== 1954 recovery ===
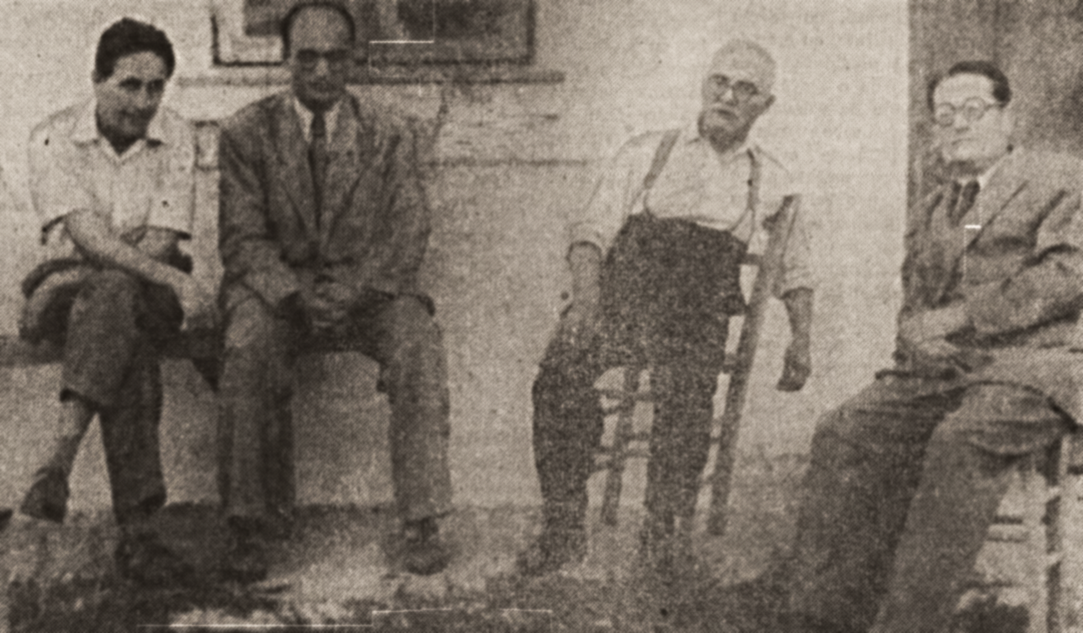
Arghezi (second from the right) with fellow writers Eugen Barbu, Ion Larian Postolache, and Nicolae Crevedia, in September 1954

Arghezi made a discreet return to publishing in his own name in 1953, when a few of his poems were hosted in the communized Viața Romînească; also then, he prepared translations of Anatole France's Bloom of Life and La Fontaine's Fables. His Prisaca ("The Apiary") was chronicled by Crohmălniceanu—as the first "and, alas, the only" critic to welcome by also directly referencing the previous ban. As noted by critic Răzvan Voncu, he had three articles published, but all of them issued after Stalin's death, with one doubling as a speech for the World Peace Council. In that context, Mitzura was allowed to study at the Caragiale Institute of Theater, where her colleagues, all of whom secretly admired her father, gave her proof of solidarity.

Still at the USR, Stancu now made oblique references to interwar authors who could still be recovered, but made it seem like they had been "buried by the bourgeoisie", rather than by communism. As Viața Romînească editor, Petru Dumitriu agreed to have Arghezian poems published in quick succession, but was still overzealous in scanning them for political content. He once rejected Arghezi's piece about a hen, which he read as an allusion to egg-price hikes; he also commissioned, but could not decide to feature, a vast philosophical poem. Crohmălniceanu, who replaced Dumitriu, takes credit for rediscovering the manuscript, which he published as Cîntare omului ("A Song to Man"). Another step in Arghezi's complete recovery was his being co-opted as a regular by Contemporanul, which was then managed by George Ivașcu.

Arghezi's rehabilitation was a very early milestone in what historian Florin Mihăilescu describes as a "process of recovering links with the interwar literary tradition", evidencing de-Stalinization (or, in Negrici's words, "the fizzling out of [communism's] fundamentalist stage"). According to researcher Ana Selejan, this transition was being sped up "not out of generosity or for artistic concerns", but rather because Arghezi and the others needed to appear as prestigious supporters of the regime, in preparation for the tenth Liberation from Fascist Occupation Day (celebrated with great expenditure in August 1954). Corbea himself connects the normalization with a state visit by Josip Broz Tito, who was Arghezi's Yugoslav admirer.

Some resistance to the reinstatement was still mounted by hardliners such as Nestor Ignat—who rated most (though not all) of his work as "decadent". For a while, Răutu's men kept notes on Arghezi's friends, primarily Călinescu and Alexandru A. Philippide, who were actively persuading magazines to feature his poetry. Likewise, Paraschivescu never recanted his earlier pronouncements, maintaining that Arghezi was inferior to the "three Bs" of Romanian poetry (George Bacovia, Ion Barbu, Lucian Blaga). In his hostile reading, the main driver of Arghezi's repurposing was communist leader Gheorghe Gheorghiu-Dej, who intended to "reconnect as much as he could with the masses" by associating with "all sorts of scoundrels of the former bourgeois-landowning regimes", Arghezi included.

Pandrea contrarily reports that the main drivers behind Arghezi's acceptance of communism were his "succumbing" to material want and his wish to have Mitzura enjoy a lavish, "strictly Orthodox", wedding. According to rumors, in 1955 Arghezi was visited at Mărțișor by Deputy Premier Iosif Chișinevschi, who, upon arriving late, was told not to worry: "I've been waiting for you people these past ten years". He was at the time involved, alongside Ionel Țăranu and two others, on a translation of Nikolai Gogol's Dead Souls, appearing at Editura Cartea Rusă. On 2 July 1955, the Academy voted in Arghezi as one of its new titular members, drafting him alongside Stancu, Ion Agârbiceanu, and Perpessicius. This was a self-avowed "restructuring" of the Academy: the minister of education, Ilie G. Murgulescu, informed the public that mere "politicians" would no longer be welcomed on that body. Around then, both of the Arghezi children were also vindicated. Baruțu, who had folded back on a career in promoting physical culture, could publish his own books of children's literature after 1954.

=== Official communist poet ===
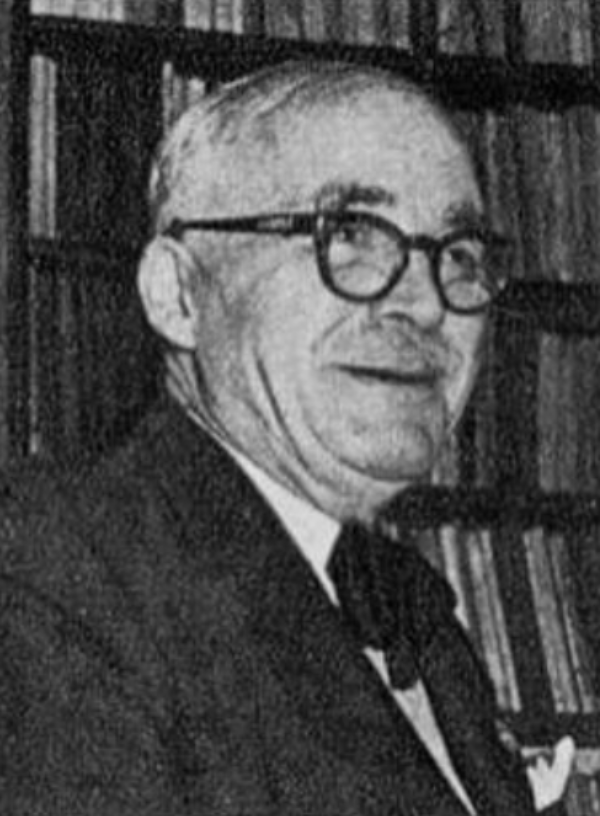
Arghezi in 1956

Shortly after his rehabilitation, Arghezi found that his disease had returned: in October 1955, he was being treated by surgeon Ion Făgărășanu, who correctly identified the infectious cause, curing him with injections of streptomycin. Ion Theodorescu only became "Tudor Arghezi" legally on 16 April 1956; he had moved to a new home at No 70 Aviatorilor Boulevard, in northern Bucharest. In July, as the communist leadership promised increased autonomy toward the Soviet Union, Arghezi was called upon to join a delegation that would travel to Moscow and seek a return of the Romanian Treasure, which remained a major point of contention between the two countries. He was welcomed at the Kremlin, and, by his own account, stood by as the Soviets handed down the "Golden Hen" and other selected items, feeling choked-up with gratitude. His initial reportage, described by Voncu as politically "neutral", was carried in Scînteia. It was soon followed by a full travelogue, Din drum ("From the Road"), which doubled as unmitigated propaganda for Nikita Khrushchev and his policies.

The communists commissioned him to write on 1907, dedicated, and named after, the peasants' revolt of 50 years prior. Arghezi tried to undermine this assignment by including the piece Instigatorul ("The Instigator"), which he published in Tînărul Scriitor magazine. Pandrea notes that this work was implicitly critical of the communist regime, and had to be suppressed; faced with the possibility of banishment, Arghezi promised not to re-offend. Corbea proposed his mentor as a headliner of the People's Democratic Front list for the parliamentary election of 1957 (in the Ipătescu section of Bucharest), and he subsequently became a member of the Great National Assembly. Additionally, Arghezi won the State Prize for Literature and was inducted into the Order of Labor.

Arghezi made a point of walking about town and allowing regular folk to engage him in conversation. During one such trip, he was approached by an interwar colleague (possibly Petru Manoliu) who had been imprisoned and who, unlike him, had not been rehabilitated; Arghezi took some pride in noting that he rudely rejected the man's plea for financial aid. Pandrea contends that, being an "industrious Oltenian", Arghezi continued to draw in revenue from Mărțișor, this time by selling overpriced cherries to his adoring fans. Winning back his readership and his prestige, he agreed to become a regular at the USR's Gazeta Literară, but only after intense negotiations over the entailing privileges. He was allowed to visit the Western bloc for specialized medical treatment, and surprised the anti-communist diaspora by discreetly attempting to make contact with his critics in exile—using Mircea Eliade and others as his intermediaries. As he told critic Paul Cornea, he returned early so as to contradict "base calumnies" by those who claimed he had defected. Instead, his estranged first-born visited with him in Bucharest on two separate occasions, but they failed to reconnect with each other.

Arghezi's output for 1957 included the selection Stihuri pestrițe ("Motley Versets"). Commissioned by Cornea, he worked on translating Bertold Brecht's Mother Courage, but it was rejected by the USR; Arghezi claimed that Stancu was personally responsible for this humiliation. In October, his daughter's colleague, Geo Saizescu, received permission to film one of his sketch stories, as Doi vecini; Mitzura was also cast in the definitive production of 1961. A string of Arghezian volumes were vetted by the Dej regime: Lume veche, lume nouă ("Old World, New World", 1958), Versuri (1959), Tablete de cronicar ("Tabloids by a Chronicler", 1960), Frunze ("Leaves", 1961), Cu bastonul prin București ("Walking with My Cane in Bucharest", 1961), Poeme noi ("New Poems", 1963), Cadențe ("Cadences", 1964). On his 80th anniversary in May 1960, he received the Order of the Star of the Republic, 1st Class, directly from Ion Gheorghe Maurer. Thanks to Corbea's intercessions, by 1961 he was a regular at Luceafărul and Scînteia Tineretului, sometimes entertaining other staff writers with stories of his youth; his contributions were generously subsidized, and always featured on the front page. In 1962, he had returned to Geneva for medical treatment, but in April was feted with a recital broadcast on Radio Romania, with Mihai Ralea as a guest speaker. Arghezi also visited Yugoslavia on Tito's Blue Train, as a guest of Vasko Popa and the Association of Writers.

In April 1964, Arghezi inaugurated his Silabe ("Syllables") series with "1943", taken up by Contemporanul in a heavily censored form—though referencing his own experience of the wartime internment, it was assumed that readers would see in it hints of anti-communism. He recalled his Oltenian background with an article the inaugural issue of the relaunched Ramuri (August 1964). The same year, he made a return trip to Paris, where he met exiled poet Paul Celan, whom he tried to persuade to work as his translator into German. As retrospectively noted in 2002 by academic Florin Mihăilescu, the post-rehabilitation period initially came with "well-deserved eulogies", but these quickly degenerated into a cult of personality that matched Dej's own. Negrici observes that Arghezi's pre-communist texts, like those of his peers, only reappeared in curated and heavily censored editions, "propped up by the crutches of 'explanatory' prefaces." Sometimes, such interventions were meant to stifle discussion about his political opportunism—in 1959, Constantin Kirițescu was allowed to publish his treatise on Romanian contributions during World War I, but did not mention Arghezi's history as a collaborationist.

=== Final years ===
In 1964, Swedish translator Arne Häggqvist, who believed that Arghezi had already reached an international audience, proposed him for the Nobel Prize in Literature. A concurrent Nobel proposal was submitted by Rosa del Conte, with backing from the Accademia dei Lincei, but Arghezi lost to Mikhail Sholokhov. Major recognition came in 1965, when Arghezi was granted the Herder Prize, personally handed in Vienna by philologist Albin Lesky; also then, he joined the Serbian Academy of Sciences and Arts. The aging writer had by then witnessed Dej's death, marking the moment with the affectionate poem Lui Gheorghiță, mamă ("To Our Little Gheorghe"). This contribution riled up sensitivities, since it glossed over the leader's implication in the mass incarcerations of Romanians and in various political murders. Obtaining imprimatur for the final revision of Silabe, he also produced the series Răzlețe ("Scattered Ones", 1965), Ritmuri ("Rhythms", 1966), and Litanii ("Litanies", 1967). The authorities relocated him to a spacious villa in Dorobanți, which was his and Mitzura's primary residence in 1965. The new PCR general secretary, Nicolae Ceaușescu, amended this arrangement by having his own son, Valentin, move into the bottom-floor apartment.

The poet's last interview, in 1966, was with the priest Gheorghe Cunescu, to whom he confessed his regrets at having betrayed and mistreated his mother—whom he still did not name (Rozalia, chased out of Mărțișor by Paraschiva, had died alone in July 1944). As a widower, he spent some of his final months at a hospice in Mogoșoaia, where he was visited by Crohmălniceanu. The latter reports seeing him frail and frightful, since "he had not found God, and therefore was gripped by boundless terror when contemplating his own mortality." In March 1967, he was keeping informed about the reprisal of Seringa at the TNB, intervening to address potential delays. In addition to painstakingly reviewing his old works for reprinting, he was working with Paul Călinescu on adapting Seringa for the screen (the text was published, but never used). He crafted a final series of "tabloids" (or Bilete de Papagal) for the journal Argeș. These were mainly concerned with matters of applied philology; linguist Gheorghe Bulgăr therefore comments that "his last-ever pages were dedicated, in pious homage, to the Romanian language."

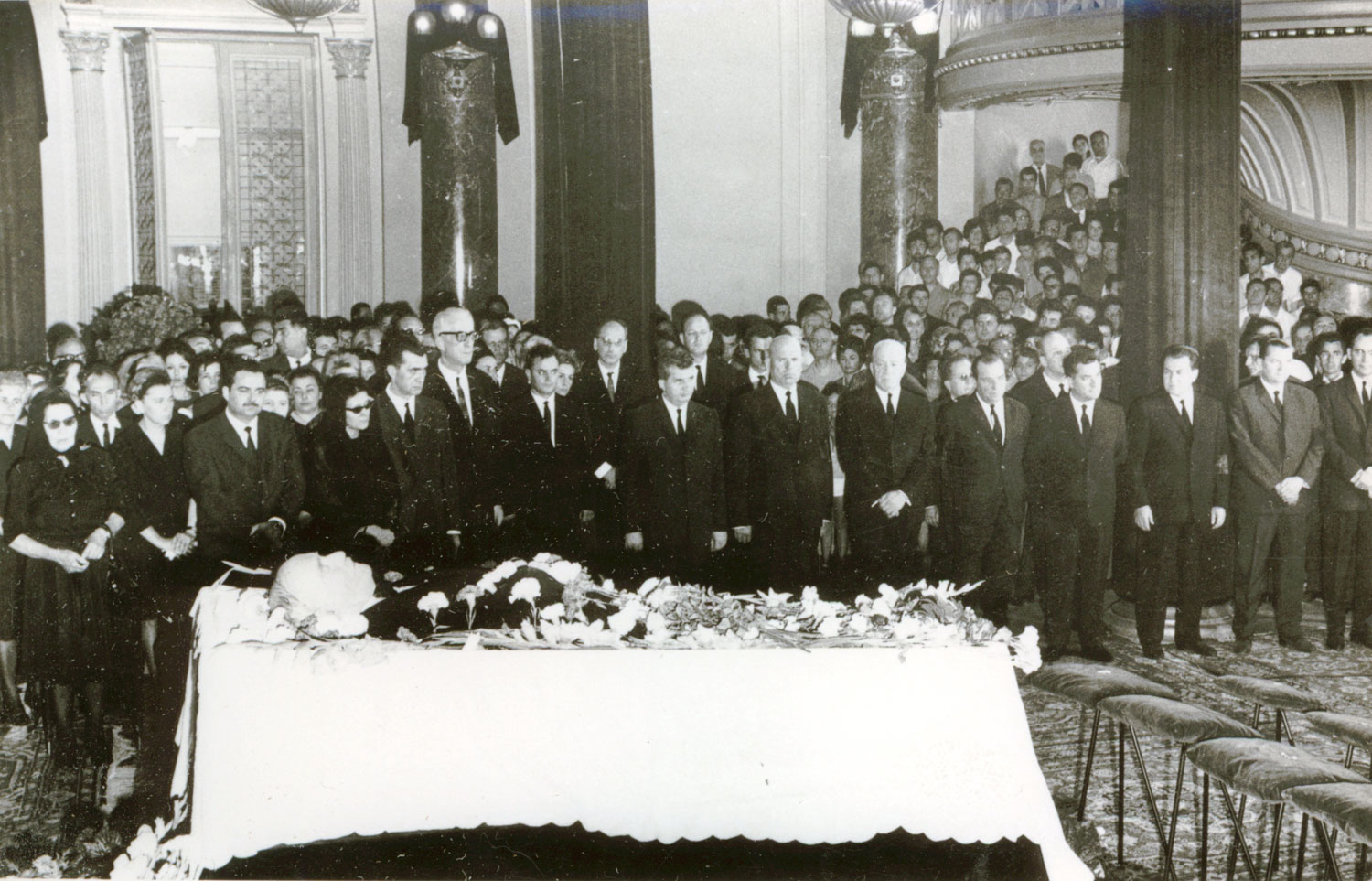
Arghezi's body being laid in state at the Romanian Atheneum

Arghezi died in Bucharest on the evening of 14 July 1967, from complications of pneumonia. This was shortly after he had seen through a final volume of poems, Noaptea ("Night"). He was laid in state at the Atheneum, with military honors, and a national day of mourning was observed. The funeral ceremony personally attended by communist leaders Ceaușescu and Chivu Stoica; Stancu, Eugen Jebeleanu and Marin Sorescu delivered funeral orations in front of a large crowd of Bucharesters. He was granted a Christian burial at Mărțișor, with services performed by Visarion Aștileanu. Homages published in the aftermath included one by the self-exiled Ionesco, who declared his regret at having once upset Arghezi, whom he reclaimed as "the last great Romanian poet among all those I ever encountered." Eli Lotar died in Paris, less than two years after his father.

== Ideology ==
=== Anarchist and instinctual conservative ===
Historian Andi Mihalache sees Arghezi's early socialism as a myth, noting that he only showed up for workers' clubs because he wanted to meet Garabet Ibrăileanu. Arghezi's radicalism, described by Mihalache as a function of his studied nonconformism, was only truly channeled after his association with the anarchist underground. This influence was described in some detail by Cioculescu, who believes that Arghezi took his first lessons in rebellion from Panait Mușoiu and from such Russian anarchists as he encountered on his trips to Switzerland. As observed by his friend Constantin Beldie, he was still an anarchist when it came to educating his children, who heard him speak ill of all organized education. Scholar Alexandru George identifies him as a figure in "individualist anarchism, with no social agenda", but adds that, by the 1930s, he was primarily a "husbandman set on getting rich", and as such "ignored by new promotions of writers". As late as 1947, Arghezi expressed sympathy for Alexandru Bogdan-Pitești and Constantin Dobrescu-Argeș—who, he argued, had associated with each other as, respectively, the leading voice of Romanian anarchism and the country's "first peasantist". Eleven years later, he spoke fondly of Mușoiu and other anarchists, but mentioned that his own collaboration at Revista Ideei had been inconsequential.

The future Carlist was a virulent republican while under N. D. Cocea's patronage at Facla, helping to depict Carol I of Romania as a "vampire-king", held as personally responsible for the mass murder of peasants. When Arghezi embraced "Germanophila", it was originally as a combination of progressivism and prejudice: he explained the early stages of World War I as a clash between an efficient Central Europe and the decaying Balkans, and was unapologetically anti-Serb, as well as anti-Russian. In subsequent decades, he became torn between eulogies of modernization (or at least a passive but marveling gazing at the promises of industrialization) and an apocalyptic technophobia, which doubled as social conservatism; overall, Pandrea reads him as attuned with the "conservative idea" that, he argues, came about naturally in rural Oltenia. Scholar Nicolae Balotă rates Arghezi as an anti-intellectualist from an organicist perspective, who rejected "the unequivocal laws of critical reason".

In Cioculescu's description, the interwar Arghezi is a "sober" humanist, who embraces humanitarian causes without overtly advertising them, and overall critical of the organized workers' movement. His own identification with the lower classes had seeped into his understanding of religion: at Bilete de Papagal, he wrote about the need to separate folk beliefs from organized religion, insisting that the Orthodox Church "is and has preserved itself as foreign." Arghezi's poetry of that era discovers as its motif the homo faber, whose "brutal materiality", as defined by Cioculescu, conditions any search for divinity. In his works of early maturity, he sometimes embraces cosmological dualism, describing Satan as a rebellious creature that was bent on conserving its own perfection. In polemics, he described atheism and dialectical materialism as preferable to the debased "idolatry" of regular believers; as argued by literary scholar Ion Rotaru, he may also found arguments in favor of heresies, from Arianism to Bogomilism, adhering to a tradition of intellectual clashes between easy-going Romanian peasants and dogmatic priests. His anti-clerical journalism became a feature in public debates, but his poetry revealed him as a self-doubting Christian. In advanced middle age, he expressed love for Jesus and Paul the Apostle—though, as Caraion informs, he regarded the former mainly as "a man who bleeds the same as us" and "a deserter from the crucifixion".

Simion sees Arghezi as having "bewildered typologies" as a "sedentary genius", a loving husband and father, in sheer contrast with his predecessor Mihai Eminescu—the latter's biography had accustomed Romanians to regarding poets as not just misfits (which Arghezi took pride in being as well), but also as unhappy ones. As recounted by Dianu, Arghezi was unapologetic about seeking a life of "comfort and stability." Riled up by the trope of the poète maudit, he adamantly believed that one only truly began developing as a poet after the age of forty. His ideological inconsistency (he once told a jury that "ideas will evolve once they're being put to paper") was always mirrored by his reputation as unscrupulously self-serving. Crohmălniceanu sees this image as at least partly deserved: Arghezi wrote most of his vitriolic lampoons only "after the figures he was hanging out to dry had been evicted from power", and was ever-ready to switch sides for the right price. In general, Arghezi regarded his journalism as base, necessarily "cynical", lucrative, and entirely separated from the poetic ideal. Pandrea notes that, although he surrounded himself with "Apaches" such as Cocea and Bogdan-Pitești, he made sure not to follow them in their "physical and moral decay." He also sees Arghezi's monarchism as self-interested, in that it "sucked money out" of Carol II, managing to subvert the king's stinginess (though also proposing that Arghezi "sincerely loved" Carol, including after the latter had started "murdering people by the roadside").

=== Arghezi in 20th-century totalitarianism ===
In a 1929 interview, Arghezi spoke of Vladimir Lenin as "the most idiotic of all of the Russians [in Geneva]", while noting that Benito Mussolini's Italian fascism was nationalism "applied with socialist means". Caraion reports that he was originally ambivalent about Nazism, allegedly preparing different sets of articles—ones were critical of Adolf Hitler, the others offered him praise. One of the latter texts was apparently preserved, with Nazism described therein as a "whiff of manhood" over Europe. Beyond his conditional support for Carlist and Antonescian totalitarianism, he always displayed some ambiguity in relation to revolutionary forms of fascism, in particular those embraced by the Iron Guard. Pandrea reports that several of Arghezi's works, including a ballad, were "sincere and un-sponsored" homages to the Guard. He is remembered for his reverence toward Guardist heroes Moța and Marin, while his poem Făt Frumos is supposedly about Corneliu Zelea Codreanu, the Guard's founder, mourning his assassination by Carol. Around 2007, after author Alex Mihai Stoenescu had explained Arghezi as a Guardist-sympathizing intellectual, critic Ion Simuț responded by quoting from Arghezi's long history of polemics with the Guardists, and dismissed the notion as absurd. According to Simuț, Arghezi's entire career in politics was as "a leftist, albeit not a very consistent one, with ephemeral liberal sympathies, and a diehard royalist".

In much of his work as a polemicist, Arghezi was also critical of antisemitism, and openly appreciative of Jewish Romanians. As a youth, he wrote for Jewish papers such as Egalitatea, but could not remember under what pseudonym. Around 1930, he was documenting (and, according to anthropologist Andrei Oișteanu, likely exaggerating) the dereliction of proletarian Jews he visited in Iași, making it known to his fellow Christians that Jews were not millionaires, nor were they engaged in a conspiracy. Arghezi was also not adverse to Zionism, once penning a sympathetic portrait of its founder, Theodor Herzl. Later, the writer defended Jews such as Paula Vexler and Radu Bogdan (the latter of whom expressed gratitude for being welcomed at Mărțișor even at the peak of Antonescu's dictatorship), and publicly mourned his disciple, Benjamin Fondane, as a Jewish victim of the Holocaust. In his private life, however, he refused to laugh at anti-Nazi anecdotes by his Jewish colleague Mihail Dan, whom he found insufferable, once dismissing him as "that kike". In August 1937, at the height of Arghezi's friendship with antisemites such as Octavian Goga, the Jewish Romanian paper, Hasmonaea, condemned him for having used Jewish stereotypes, even while fighting Iorga's influence. According to this description, Arghezi was a "right-wing figure, of a typically extremist hue." Arghezi himself claimed that, in 1939, the Jewish iron magnate Max Auschnitt had offered to sponsor him in writing against the rising wave of antisemitism, but that he would not oblige, since it would have conditioned him to become Auschnitt's "lackey". Jewish literary scholars such as A. B. Yoffe argued that, beyond his posthumous reputation as a "friend of the Jews", he had a history of "slips into antisemitism"; though vague, his preface to Constantin Virgil Gheorghiu's book was especially controversial, since Gheorghiu was effectively condoning the mass deportation of Jews.

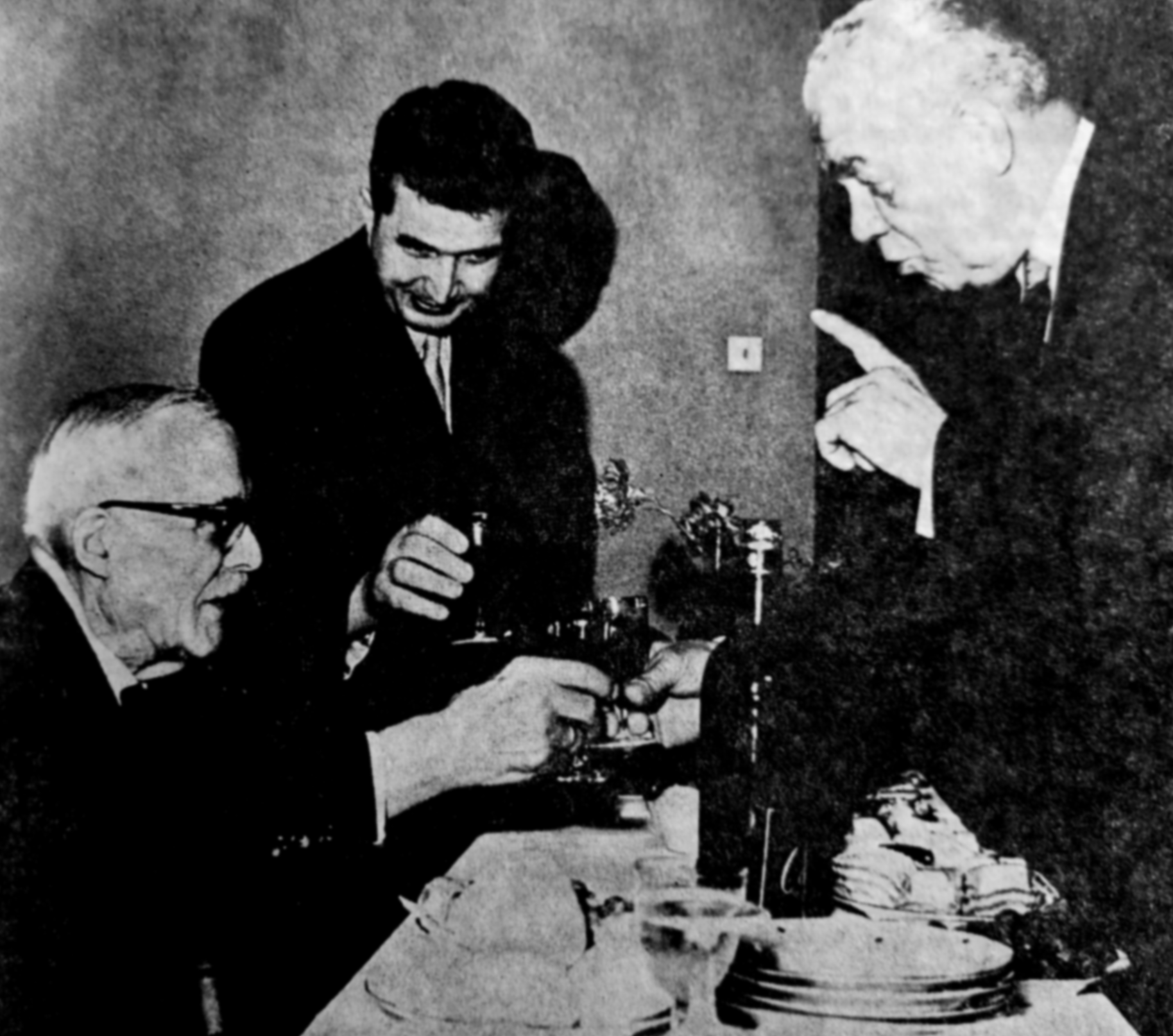
Communist potentates Emil Bodnăraș and Nicolae Ceaușescu toasting to Arghezi's health

The poet was strongly criticized as a moral relativist by all sides he engaged in postwar polemics, from the communist Miron Radu Paraschivescu (who, in 1945, described him as an "impostor" and a "deceitful comrade") to the anti-communist Virgil Ierunca (who called him a "great prostitute"). Paraschivescu was motivated by intense hatred of the senior poet—reciprocated by Arghezi, who repeatedly called Paraschivescu racial epithets hinting at a Romani origin. More generally, Simion opined that, at least in respect to communism, Arghezi had been right to accept a compromise option, since that ensured a degree of cultural preservation; he also noted that Ierunca had glossed over Arghezi's own exclusion under early communism. Baruțu was among those who fought back against his father's depiction as a "Red", publishing fragments rescued from the "era of total interdiction", with their arguments in favor of artistic freedom.

In his analysis of Sorin Toma's text, Mihalache argues that it largely stood for the PCR's frustration at not having managed to enlist his collaboration. Toma therefore had to rely on the claim that Arghezi had never really been left-wing, but rather a concealed reactionary. The historian argues that, at least when it came to judging Arghezi's hypocrisy, Toma's interpretation was "solidly rooted in facts." Mihalache concludes that Arghezi's six-year isolation was more of a disciplining and "re-education" attempt, rather than a project of annihilation. Pandrea sees the aging Arghezi as playing his usual "game of political poker" with those in control. Though a "jester" for the regime, he saved himself by always displaying "an obvious look of repugnance." The same author concedes that: "Actually, T. Arghezi has never been wrong, since his syllables, his meter, his rhymes were never wrong." Lucian Boia likewise argues that Arghezi maintained a "relative decency", only producing as much propaganda as was necessary for his own survival as a writer. Boia observes that, by this token, Arghezi was less of a collaborationist than those intellectuals who directly assisted the PCR on its way to power.

In the early 1960s, the poet had reportedly applied to join the PCR. By then, he was coming to be seen by the mass of his readers as not just a literary great, but also a paragon of morality—as Caraion argues, he was "our very first great moralist", whose detractors were generally self-interested or dimwitted. Rejecting such claims (which he describes as myths that were embraced by regular readers), Negrici proposes that they were entirely opposed to facts, relying instead on confabulation and a "need for certainty". Beyond debates over his pragmatic motives, Arghezi was also at least partly compatible with the tenets of national-communism. Novelist Gheorghe Crăciun believes that Arghezi's veneration of the peasant psyche, while "sublime" in itself, was only quoted by the PCR because it educated Romanians into accepting "the vicious circle of suffering and redemption"; this required them to see communism itself as a necessary evil, and thus to not actively oppose it.

== Literary work ==
=== Poetry ===
Arghezi viewed himself as an artisan of a laborious and torturous craft. At Bilete de Papagal, he preached complete sincerity, advising his followers to distrust fame, convention, and especially formalism. Balotă regards his lyrical theorizing as revolving around the idea of a "fruit", of germination and fecundity within the writing process, as well as in the preferred imagery. Another fundamental myth of his poetry was his belief in the "proud solitude" of a poet—with fainter echoes of his "abysmal fear" in front of life's essences. This shows up in various pieces that (various authors note) resemble Christian poetry without ever fully merging into it, since they describe God the Father as a frustratingly self-concealing deity; Duhovnicească ("Spiritual Confession") and various "Psalms" are widely hailed as masterpieces of this series. Many readers have commented on Arghezi's seemingly unlimited poetic resources, and his eluding all definitions by embracing in turn all the manifestations of modernism, and remaining original, with the same core traits, throughout. Scholar Miklós Szabolcsi rated him as a final exponent of the local Symbolist school, "reconsidered [by Arghezi] in a national optic." His stylistic education, shaped by the contrasting influences of Eminescu and Alexandru Macedonski, was also directly based on Symbolism as an international phenomenon. A brief, fully expressionist phase was also identifiable just before 1916—with expressionistic undertones still appearing over a decade later.

Arghezi found common ground with the interwar's traditionalist movement only by searching authenticity. Cioculescu describes this transition as unusual, in that Arghezi was first an outstandingly radical, "cosmopolitan" poet, and only later discovered his "national fiber"; this transformation and discarding of "foreign idols" was mirrored by his village-themed and peasant-focused political poetry, beginning with the 1910s piece Belșug ("Wealth"). Leaning into Romanian folklore, Arghezi also cultivated a phonology that either was, or seemed to be, heavily based on the Oltenian dialect—though often infused with jarring neologisms of diverse provenance. According to Negrici, Arghezi is largely a modernist, but, like all Romanian modernists, is fundamentally more conservative than its Western models, being entirely devoid of anti-artistic sentiment. The core lines in Cuvinte potrivite are read by critics as both an artistic credo and a meditation on the immense, unsung, efforts of anonymous ancestors:

Ca să schimbăm, acum, întâia oară,
Sapa-n condei și brazda-n călimară,
Bătrânii-au adunat, printre plăvani,
Sudoarea muncii sutelor de ani.
Din graiul lor cu-ndemnuri pentru vite
Eu am ivit cuvinte potrivite[.]

Translation:

So that we may discard our clod-and-spade,
And move up to the ink-and-paper trade,
Our elders have endured, among their tarnished cattle,
Ages and ages of a sweaty battle.
Out of their language, meant for steering herds,
I spawned my own array of suited words[.]

As Cioculescu notes, after "the monument of our lyricism" that is Cuvinte potrivite, each new volume added "a new small universe to his lyrical horizons." In Flori de mucigai, he transfigures his own experiences in Văcărești Prison, evoking Goya's Caprichos. Some portions of this cycle, which are more narrative, descend into the surrounding mahala and bohemian Bucharest. In steep contrast, Hore is viewed by Cioculescu as a product of "[Arghezi's] enormous joy, benignly humiliating his adversaries", and as the first Arghezian experiment with the staples of children's songs. This series was, in Simion's words, the most microcosmic and "Franciscan" of all his lyrical output.

The 1950s saw a swift change of style and perspective, as prompted by his political handlers—the resulting works are seen by Simion as "unequal", but never shameful. In Cîntare omului, Arghezi sets out to free mankind from what Cioculescu defines as "the old mystical-religious terrors", graduating it into the age of scientific progress and space exploration. Cîntare won immediate praise from the official critic Tudor Vianu—but, Negrici argues, was "dim" and "thesist", lacking all characteristics that had made Arghezi into a great poet. 1907 is described by Arghezi's partisans as a salvageable lesson in social poetry. Rotaru notes that the series is also the first one to describe peasants as "monumental", with imagery borrowed from the Bible, whereas the upper class is vilified as criminal and unbearably grotesque by nature. He also argues that any such work carries the burden of "lyrical objectivity" and didacticism.

=== Prose ===
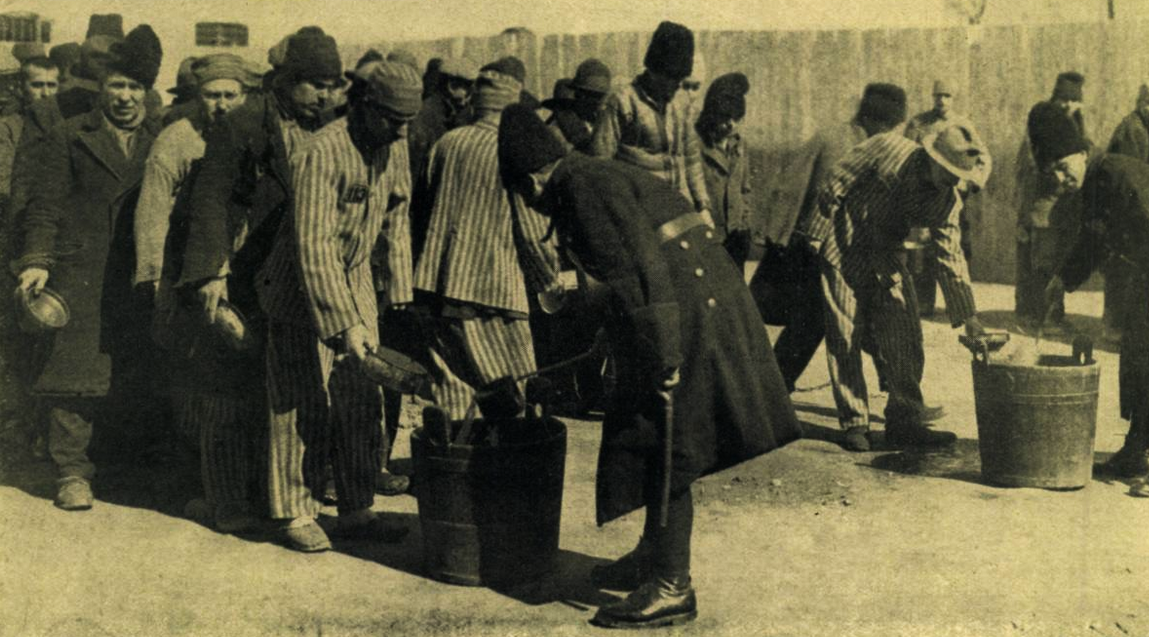
Lunch being served at Văcărești Prison in 1935

Arghezi's overall prose was widely thought of as inimitable, combining "an inexhaustible reservoir of words" and an "immense capacity for [personal] impressions, sensations, feelings, and thoughts." Crohmălniceanu once reflected on Arghezi's takeover of Romanian grammar, with phrases that were rearranged counterintuitively, yet coherently. Simion proposes that, while the targets and goals of his satire are now entirely obscure, his "fantastic drawings", echoing Jonathan Swift, continue to entice the imagination.

For all his generic talent in prose, Arghezi is often described as a failed novelist, who had little patience for the epic genre and too often slipped back into either his usual imprecations or his intense lyricism. Icoane pe lemn, written in his self-titled "tabloid" style—that combines virulent lampoon and dispassionate description of outrageous facts of life—, pokes fun at the moral failings of seemingly imbecilic monks. Poarta neagră is in large part a disguised memoir of Văcărești, with detail about fellow inmates. Baruțu suggests that Ochii Maicii Domnului is "not a novel in the classic sense, [but] a beautiful life story", with faint elements of its author's life between Chitila and Geneva. It is also largely a "mystical" depiction of motherly love—and a prose counterpart to his rhymes in Vraciul, with digressions that, Simion notes, "evidence Arghezi's verbal genius". The same critic sees 1936's Cimitirul Buna-Vestire as a political novel, or as a fresco of corruption and moral degradation in Greater Romania, but one written in quasi-independent "tabloids" that can be regarded as individual masterpieces.

Lina is Arghezi's sole autobiographical novel; in addition to rare insight into his life, the book encapsulates a political manifesto, described by Cioculescu as targeting "foreign capital", bringing in the "unregulated human fabric" of monstrous foreigners. Published shortly after with its far-reaching consequences, Baroane affirmed rural-based patriotism against the Nazi overlord, accused by Arghezi of having squandered Romania's natural resources. Cartea cu jucării combines affectionate accounts of domestic life, didactic fragments, and various fairy-tales. The mix was lauded by critic Pompiliu Constantinescu as a wondrous extension of Arghezi's literary universe, and by scholar Gheorghe Achiței as a disguised "textbook of aesthetic education".

Arghezi's final prose work was mainly done in journalism, travelogues, and art criticism. These still included his core stylistic features. He also refrained from mentioning communism other than as "the regime", and generally avoided direct quotes from propaganda, except in pages he dedicated to Lenin. In documenting Arghezi's one serious attempt to become a featured dramatist, with Seringa, theatrologist Ioan Massoff argued that the text is a "lampoon in dialogue form", which "only has documentary value". Scholar Constantin Cubleșan proposes that Arghezi's output in drama was divided as two distinct categories: Seringa belonged to a tradition of theatrical realism, while other scattered farces were more daringly modernist, and akin to Absurdism.

== Legacy ==
=== Influence ===
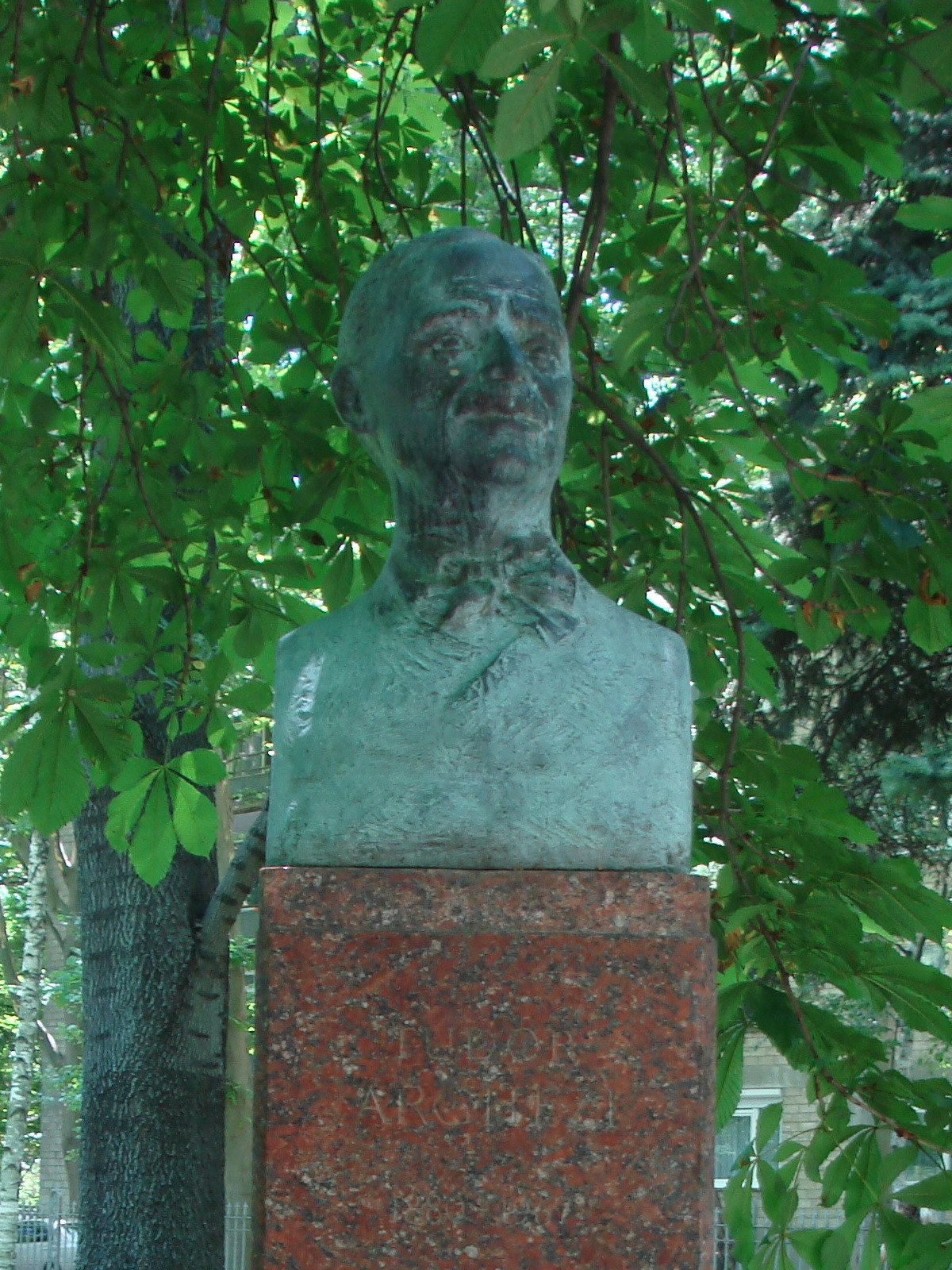
Alley of Classics bust

Scholars note that Arghezi endures as "perhaps the strongest personality in all of 20th-century Romanian literature" (Simion), worshiped as a "patriarch of Romanian poetry" (Dianu). His revolutionary intrusion in the literary language was such that scholars such as George Călinescu analyzed all preceding poetry in relation with Arghezi, implying that most of such early products were necessarily inferior. Focusing on the linguistic register, Caraion claimed: "Eminescu has created [it]. Arghezi has turned it into a never-ending spectacle."

In his 1972 overview, Rotaru commented that Arghezi's imitators had been "surprisingly few", given his position as a mandatory reference. His influences on radical Symbolists were felt even before Cuvinte potrivite: in this proto-avant-garde, Benjamin Fondane allowed his own poetry to be infused with, and elevated by, Arghezian echoes. While his cultivation of Urmuz and other portions of the local avant-garde was generally influential, his Flori de mucigai was a more direct inspiration for the 1930s surrealist Geo Bogza. Among the authors that came of age during World War II, Caraion was his most committed disciple. In the mid-to-late 1950s, rehabilitation imposed Arghezi as a necessary model for even younger writers, who had been previously unable to move out of communist schemas. In 1957, Eugen Barbu was the first novelist to embrace Arghezian aesthetics. Fănuș Neagu achieved fame for his unusual and confounding prose, with grammatical patterns and a range of expression that matched Arghezi's, while Ilie Purcaru expanded on Arghezi's style of lyrical propaganda. Arghezi's satirical storytelling was copied to a degree by Teodor Mazilu and Romulus Vulpescu, while his verse was being pastiched by Nichita Stănescu and parodied by Marin Sorescu. With Seringa, Arghezi also announced the "polemical comedies" of Aurel Baranga, which were popular at the height of communism. Such influence was at least partly visible among the Optzeciști writers of late communism, who embraced interwar models for their experimentation and quality, but also reinterpreted them in an increasingly postmodern fashion.

In his private diary for 1957, the repressed Dianu ventured to argue that Arghezi would end up being exposed for his immorality, but then again reevaluated, and understood as a genius. He concluded that: "Arghezi, like the solar spectrum, carries all the colors, and only by spinning him do we get the white. And spinning is something he sure knows how to do". Arghezi's politics, in particular his collaboration with the PCR, have been met with renewed criticism after the Romanian Revolution of 1989. On the 25th commemoration of Arghezi's death (July 1992), scholar Laurențiu Ulici wrote that "the greatest [poet] we've had after Eminescu" did not deserve the new censorial trend, arguing that it would naturally subside with the publication of new, more complete works of criticism. According to Simion, this "wave of dissatisfaction, grounded in morality", is "amazing in its irresponsibility", forming part of a "tragedy of Romanian values, repressed by their epoch, crushed by History, and periodically torn apart by human folly." Similarly, essayist Magda Ursache noted a tendency whereby Arghezi continued to be condemned for his communist association, whereas his persecutors Paraschivescu and Sorin Toma were reviewed with nuanced sympathy. Toma himself returned to the dispute with a retraction and justification, carried by Vatra magazine in 1997.

=== Translations, editions, portrayals ===
In early 1939, Sorana Gurian had completed French versions of unspecified fragments from Arghezi's writings, which she intended to have published in Charpentes magazine. A three-man team comprising Eugène Ionesco, Jean Tortel, and Ilarie Voronca produced what may have been the first versions of Arghezian poems in French. These appeared in Les Cahiers du Sud of 1943, overstepping boundaries imposed by the Vichy regime. Their effort was shortly followed by Italian translations, produced by Anna and Petru Iroaie in 1945. Caraion was involved in some other such projects, with Italian and German renditions appearing in his Agora of mid-1947. In particular during communism, Arghezian translations were an international effort, with contributions from writers who were often notable on their own. International fame peaked in 1961, when selections of his verse appeared in Spanish (by Rafael Alberti and María Teresa León) and German (by Alfred Margul-Sperber, who was preceded in this effort by Oskar Pastior).

Leftist Yiannis Ritsos is credited as Arghezi's translator into Greek, but this is questionable (since Ritsos reportedly "could not speak a word of Romanian", he may only have edited the work of anonymous translators); Hungarian translations were done by Ferenc Szemlér and Sándor Kányádi; Russian versions by A. Sadetski and others appeared as a volume in 1960. These samples were used for Chinese translations by Ge Baoquan (1958), with direct Romanian-to-Chinese versions only appearing after 1980, on Xu Wende's initiative. By the time of Arghezi's death, his poems had appeared in at least 12 different languages—including two full French versions of Cuvinte potrivite, one of them by composer Luc-André Marcel; an Italian selection, by Salvatore Quasimodo; and Bulgarian contributions by Elisaveta Bagryana and N. Zidarov. The first corpus of Arghezian translations into English was produced by Michael Impey and Brian Swann, published by Princeton University Press in 1976. Himself a translator, Andrei Brezianu was impressed by this "superb bilingual edition", which rendered Arghezian particularities through stylistic borrowings from W. B. Yeats, sometimes in free verse. Another English selection of what was intended as "Arghezi's most touching poetry" was published by Andrei Bantaș in 1983. In 1978, Vladimir Ciocov had added an Arghezian selection in Serbo-Croatian.

Such attempts ran parallel to the writer's fuller recovery at home. The investigations into his undisclosed origins and early life began in earnest in 1976, when C. Popescu-Cadem caused a stir by denying that Arghezi had been a first-generation Oltenian. An official corpus of his works had been inaugurated as early as 1962, and was completed in 2006. In 2000, Mitzura Arghezi and Traian Radu began putting out their own alternative corpus, vetted by the Academy; it ended in 2011 with a volume of his communist-era articles. Between these two dates, Mitzura had sparked controversy with her rigid take on copyright law, reportedly charging exorbitant sums to anyone wishing to reprint any of Arghezi Sr's writings. Baruțu, who had emigrated to Switzerland in 1974, made frequent returns to Romania after 1989, publishing books of memoirs, travel notes, biographical material on Arghezi Sr; he died in 2010 in Arad, leaving another trove of his father's manuscripts, which were in the process of being reviewed for print.

Theodor Pallady's drawing of Arghezi, published alongside Poarta neagră, was much disliked by the poet. He was also a subject in avant-garde art by Marcel Janco and M. H. Maxy—the latter's drawing, more daring in its experimentation, was received by Arghezi with "sarcastic bewilderment" (according to Radu Bogdan). Other painters who left portraits of him include Camil Ressu, Henry Mavrodin, and Corneliu Baba. Arghezi's bust, done in 1960 by Cornel Medrea, was installed on permanent public display at Craiova. A similar work, created by Tudor Panait, was put up in 1972 at Târgu Cărbunești. A street in downtown Bucharest was renamed after the poet in 1968. In 1974, Baruțu Arghezi had obtained that the Romanian state pay for a bronze plaque, the work of sculptor Teodor Ionescu, which was mounted on Geneva's Rue des Pavillions; in 1994, on Gheorghe Tomozei's initiative, an Arghezi medal was minted. The poet is also honored in Moldova: in 1995, a bust by Tudor Cataraga was inaugurated on the Moldovan Alley of Classics. Tudor Arghezi station was constructed in late 2022, as part of an expansion of the Bucharest Metro.
