= List of Romanian actors =

This is a list of Romanian actors, actresses, playwrights, and directors, whether on stage or in film. Most of these people made at least a significant portion of their career in Romanian-language theater, although some are merely of Romanian origin.

== A ==
- Mircea Albulescu
- Mircea Anca
- Violeta Andrei
- Kristaq Antoniu
- Alexandru Arșinel

== B ==
- Marga Barbu (born Butuc), actress
- Leopoldina Bălănuță, actress
- Ștefan Bănică, Sr., actor
- Radu Beligan, actor, director
- Ion Besoiu, actor
- Grigore Vasiliu-Birlic
- Claudiu Bleonț, actor
- Olga Bucătaru, film and stage actress
- Tamara Buciuceanu, actress

== C ==
- George Calboreanu, actor, composer
- Șerban Cantacuzino, actor
- I.L. Caragiale, playwright
- Toma Caragiu, actor
- Ion Caramitru, actor
- Florin Călinescu, actor
- Liviu Ciulei, director, actor
- Constantin Codrescu, actor
- Roxana Condurache
- Geo Costiniu, actor
- Octavian Cotescu, actor
- Gheorghe Cozorici, actor

== D ==
- Iurie Darie, actor
- Gheorghe Dinică, actor
- Mircea Diaconu, actor

== E ==
- Fory Etterle, actor

== F ==
- Alex Floroiu, actor

== G ==
- Vladimir Găitan, actor
- Luminița Gheorghiu, actress
- Bunica Gherghina, TikToker and actress
- Alexandru Giugaru, actor

== H ==
- Kira Hagi, actress and daughter of famous footballer Gheorghe Hagi
- Manuela Hărăbor, actress
- Emil Hossu, actor
- John Houseman, actor (born in Romania to a French-born Jewish father and an English mother, made his career in the United States as an English-language film and television actor)

== I ==
- Aimée Iacobescu, actress
- Șerban Ionescu, actor
- Ștefan Iordache, actor
- Marcel Iureș, actor

== J ==
- Jean Constantin, actor

== M ==
- Ernest Maftei, actor
- Alexandra Maria Lara (born Plătăreanu), actress
- Nicolae Massim, director
- Horațiu Mălăele, actor
- Ștefan Mihăilescu-Brăila, actor
- George Mihăiță, actor
- Matei Millo, stage actor
- Mihaela Mitrache, actress
- Marin Moraru, actor
- Maia Morgenstern
- Florentina Mosora
- George Motoi, actor

== N ==
- Jean Negulescu, film director, Oscar nominee

== O ==
- Draga Olteanu Matei, actress

== P ==
- Sebastian Papaiani, actor
- Oana Pellea, actress
- Irina Petrescu, actress
- Florin Piersic, actor
- Adrian Pintea, actor
- Margareta Pogonat, actress
- Elvira Popescu, actress
- Ion Popescu-Gopo, director
- Mitică Popescu, actor
- Rodica Popescu Bitănescu, actress
- Stela Popescu, actress

== R ==
- Dem Rădulescu, actor
- Colea Răutu, actor
- Victor Rebengiuc, actor
- Duncan Renaldo, actor (Romanian-born, achieved fame in America as The Cisco Kid, a hero to children of the 1950s)
- Alexandru Repan, actor
- Edward G. Robinson, actor (Romanian-born Jew, made career in United States as an English-language film actor)
- Aristizza Romanescu, actress

== S ==
- Geo Saizescu, actor
- Alec Secăreanu, actor
- Sebastian Stan, actor, naturalized American citizen
- Silviu Stănculescu, actor
- Carmen Stănescu, actress

== T ==
- Constantin Tănase, cabaretist

== V ==
- Tora Vasilescu, actress
- Grigore Vasiliu Birlic, actor
- Mihai Verbițchi, actor
- Mircea Veroiu, actor, director, screenwriter
- Dorel Vișan, actor

== W ==
- Johnny Weissmuller, actor (born in what is now Timișoara, Romania, ethnically German, made career in United States as an English-language film actor)

== Z ==
- Florin Zamfirescu, actor

== See also ==
- List of Romanian actresses
