= Dem Rădulescu =

Romanian actor, director, and politician (1931–2000)

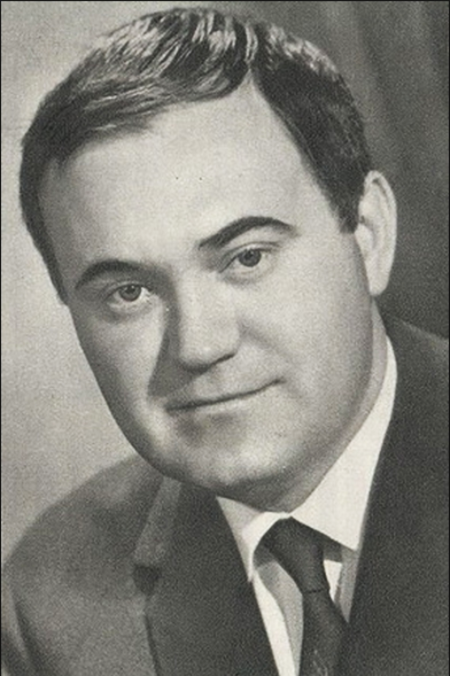
- Rădulescu in 1963
- Born: Dumitru R. Rădulescu; 21 September 1931; Râmnicu Vâlcea, Kingdom of Romania
- Died: 10 September 2000 (aged 68); Câmpina, Prahova County, Romania
- Resting place: Bellu Cemetery, Bucharest
- Occupations: Comedian, actor, singer, director, academic, screenwriter, politician, athlete
- Years active: 1948–2000
- Spouse: Adriana Șchiopu
- Children: Irina Rădulescu
- Awards: 1st Prize at the National Youth Competition (1957); Order of Cultural Merit (1967) "Golden Voices" Award, Radio Romania (1999)

Dumitru R. Rădulescu, known professionally as Dem Rădulescu or Rădulescu-Biban (Romanian pronunciation: [dem rəduˈlesku]; 21 September 1931 – 10 September 2000), was a Romanian comedian, actor, director, and professor at the Caragiale National University of Theatre and Film (UNATC). Though attracted to acting in his late teens, he was initially an athlete, and had a short career in semi-professional boxing. His life, from his debut years to his fifties, was spent under the communist regime, whose values were sometimes present in his roles. At the National Theater Bucharest, young Rădulescu was mainly cast in Soviet plays, including one based on Anton Makarenko's pedagogy, before he found his niche as a performer in comedies by the Romanian classic Ion Luca Caragiale, as directed by Sică Alexandrescu. Increasingly recognized for his contributions in Shakespearean comedy, he was also a favorite of the author Aurel Baranga, who used him in satires targeting social parasitism.

Rădulescu's first cinematic roles, taken up in the early 1960s, included light comedies based on Caragiale and other local writers, as well as international projects by the likes of René Clair. He became a national celebrity during the 1970s, with a recurring buffoonish role in Brigada Diverse series, as well as with a supporting role in a children's musical, Veronica; he was widely acclaimed for his comedic roles on both the state television network and Radio Bucharest, though his reputation in such media was harmed by the steady decline of production values. The crowning of his Caragialesque roles was with Liviu Ciulei's production of O scrisoare pierdută (1972), and he continued to act in the related corpus of plays and adapted sketch stories, into the 1990s. His career suffered several setbacks during that interval, in particular due to Rădulescu's acceptance of roles in poor-quality projects. Despite his classical training, he was always willing to work in revues, variety shows and stand-up routines, resulting in his being shunned by more aesthetically minded critics. He is credited with having helped to create a touring variety-show formula which always had mass appeal.

The Romanian Revolution of 1989 occurred just as Rădulescu was finding renewed respect as an actor, director, and academic; graduates of his classes include figures such as Maia Morgenstern and Dan Puric. The post-revolutionary period saw him accepting roles in sex comedies and adopting ribaldry in his stand-up acts. He continued to impress his peers with his occasional repertory roles, including as Spirache for a televised version of Tudor Mușatescu's Titanic Waltz (1992). For a while, he was interested in politics and had an unsuccessful run in the legislative election of May 1990. By 1996, Rădulescu's career in cinema had effectively ended, but he continued to enjoy success as a television comedian, creating shows on Tele7ABC and Pro TV. Beset by hypertension, he ultimately died of a heart attack just short of his 69th birthday. His young daughter Irina Rădulescu achieved recognition as an actress, upon reaching adulthood.

== Biography ==
=== Early life ===
The actor was born "Dumitru R. Rădulescu" in Râmnicu Vâlcea town. Some confusion exists as to the day, which some sources indicate as 17 September 1931. Dem allowed it to be mentioned as 31 September, a nonexistent day, before clarifying that this was a misprint for the 21st. His parents were ethnic Romanians from two different parts of the Romanian Kingdom: his mother was a homemaker from Transylvania, while his father, a local Oltenian, ran a clothes shop, and was known locally for supporting the right-leaning National Liberals. The couple had in total three boys, of whom Dem was the youngest. He once indicated his father as the earliest source for his distinct brand of humor, though he did not yet consider going into acting. As he remembered in a 1980s interview, as a child he was only vaguely familiar with the craft: he watched, and greatly enjoyed, films starring Jean Gabin (whom he regarded as an amateur of genius), but never attended a theatrical production until World War II, in 1943. The event involved a Bucharest troupe led by Constantin Tănase, with Maria Tănase as a musical act. The boy was charmed by the "miracle" of stagecraft, and would hang around for hours on end next to the actors' railroad car, which was stationed in close proximity to his childhood home.

Rădulescu's other experiences of life at the station included begging from Wehrmacht soldiers heading toward the Eastern Front, and rushing in to gawk at other transients, from a Red Army captive to scores of Polish refugees and Jewish deportees. Upon the end of the war, Romania was occupied by the Soviets, with the local Communist Party emerging as a powerful player. As a former officer in the Royal Romanian Air Force, Dem's oldest brother campaigned for the opposition National Peasants' Party, then tried to flee the country. He was captured and then imprisoned, dying shortly after as an unrepenting anti-communist; for part of his own life, Dem protected his own career under the Romanian communist regime by omitting to mention his brother's political profile. Rădulescu's father had meanwhile lost his shop, becoming instead manager of a fishmongers' co-operative—his new profession upgraded his political profile, allowing him to be considered frequentable by the new leftist governments. This change of careers also accounts for his son's nickname, Bibanu ("Perch"), which was used throughout his lifetime. For a while in the 1960s, he was credited as "Rădulescu-Biban", but later came to object when people other than his family, friends or students referred to him as such.

Dem attended the high school now known as Alexandru Lahovari National College, located in his native city. He was a mediocre student, who once took remedial maths; though he read up on theatrical arts at the school library, approaching them with reverence, he confessed that he understood "next to nothing" from these. Joining an amateur troupe, he recited his first poem when he was sixteen or older. He then hesitated between acting, which his schoolmates had described as his natural inclination, and professional sports. While always attracted by boxing, he appeared in association football and volleyball competitions. He eventually qualified as a welterweight boxer. By his own account, he was accepted as a trainee by the heavyweight champion Gheorghe Lungu, but "got cold feet" after being pummeled by a lower-rated fighter "in the second round" of an unspecified event. From this episodic career, Rădulescu preserved several medals; he remained active as an amateur footballer into his forties, training with FC Progresul and Dinamo as a regular member of the Romanian actors' exhibition team. He was also close friends with footballers Ion Nunweiller of Dinamo and Dumitru Macri of Rapid, though he mainly supported his local team, Chimia.

Young Rădulescu moved to Bucharest, intending to be admitted into the Caragiale Institute (IATC, the future UNATC). He passed his examination with Gheorghe Storin, the 33rd out of ninety candidates, and then qualified for a national scholarship. His head teacher was tragedian Beate Fredanov, but he secretly considered going into comedy, and was hurt when once told that he lacked the chops for humorous projects. During his studies, he happened to run into a film crew, and debuted as an extra in a historical film, whose title he could not remember. He graduated in 1954, when he also made his debut at the National Theater Bucharest (TNB)—with a classical role in Anton Chekhov's Bear.

=== Alexandrescu's pupil ===
Though graduating with honors, Rădulescu, like others under that period in communism, was having difficulties feeding himself; as he recalled, a payment supplement allowed him to consume half a loaf of white bread and a jar of stuffed eggplants, daily. In 1956, he joined the permanent teaching staff at his alma mater. He also appeared as the antagonist, Gryshka Ryzhykov, in a stage adaption of Anton Makarenko's Flags on the Battlements, directed by Ion Cojar at the TNB (and subsequently showcased at the Young Actors' Competition). Critics were divided: Manase Radnev enjoyed his "authenticity and naturalness", whereas Mira Iosif was not impressed by his "supposedly expressive grimaces" (though she noted his "great potential for comedy"). He was one of seven recipients of the national young actors' prize in June 1957. By May 1958, he was an understudy in Alexandru Adamescu's Judecata focului. During 1959, he supported the main cast of An Optimistic Tragedy at the TNB, playing The Odessan, and receiving praise for his "expressivity". He returned in competition for the youth prize as Ivan in The Last Ones, by Maxim Gorky. Emil Riman of Teatrul magazine deemed his study of the character as largely correct, though insufficient.

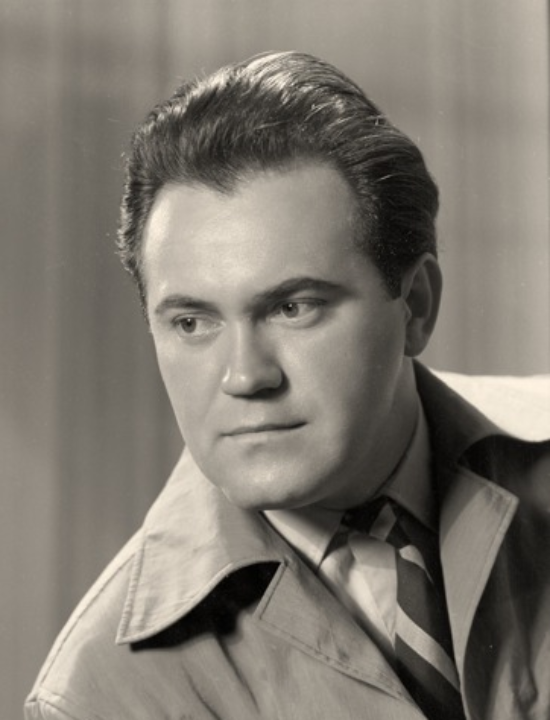
Rădulescu in 1959

Rădulescu's registered film debut came the same year with Lucian Bratu's Secretul cifrului. He had just completed his service in the Land Forces, which helped him prepare for the role; by 1988, he was a Sublieutenant in the reserves. As noted by researcher Jean Badea, Rădulescu was also one of several Romanian actors who transitioned from classical training toward the revue genre. His belief that he was only suited for comedic roles was cemented after 1959, when he appeared alongside Mitzura Arghezi at a Sala Palatului festival commemorating poet George Coșbuc. Wearing a folk costume, he recited a serious poem to some 2,600 spectators, all of whom proceeded to laugh copiously. Rădulescu was therefore relieved when cast in a production of An Irkutsk Story, done in 1960 by the TNB. He won Mira Iosif's praise for his role (Lapchenko), and also claimed that the play's author, Aleksei Arbuzov, personally congratulated him.

As a rule, Rădulescu did not accept mentors in his comedic routine, though he declared admiration for Jerry Lewis and for Laurel and Hardy. The young graduate was seen as still unprepared by the IATC's Mihai Dimiu, who believed that he always did the same character, regardless of whether the text was by Molière or by Bertold Brecht. He was nonetheless being scouted by the celebrated director Sică Alexandrescu, who held the belief that "comedy is a very serious matter."

The aspiring actor regarded Alexandrescu as "the man who birthed me", recalling the frantic efforts he made not to lose his mentor's trust. After unintentionally running late at rehearsal, and fearing he would be sacked, he claimed to have been at the doctor's, and that he had cavernous tuberculosis; he managed to raise shock and sympathy, and was kept on, though every one of his colleagues forgot about his supposed illness within days of the incident. Their early collaborations included TNB stagings of Siciliana, by Aurel Baranga. The play, which satirized social parasitism, was regarded as unsatisfactory by the columnist-playwright Valentin Silvestru, who commended Rădulescu for trying to uplift the text by adding in "his own brand of humor".

=== Rise to fame ===
During 1961, Rădulescu was part of the inaugural troupe of the Bucharest Comedy Theater, founded and managed by Radu Beligan. At the TNB, he took the role as a "small-time crook" in Milionarii, by Ion Istrati, which dealt with the social landscape of rural collectivization; it earned him the admiration of dramatist and critic Dinu Săraru. Alexandru Finţi took him on in an August 1962 production of Boulevard Durand, by Armand Salacrou; his performance there was noted as classical and subdued. As a member of the Alexandrescu TNB ensemble, Rădulescu was cast as a waiter in Ion Luca Caragiale's D'ale carnavalului. The play was recorded for Radio Bucharest, airing there on 18 May 1962. During October 1962, he was also assigned to work in theatrical evenings on the state television network, filming alongside Ștefan Bănică Sr. and Florin Scărlătescu on Paul Everac's Mașina de scris. In July 1963, he told jokes within a variety show staged in the resort town of Mamaia, which also aired live on TV. Alexandrescu was by then using him in several productions of the Caragialesque repertory text, O scrisoare pierdută—he was Nae Cațavencu or the Inebriated Citizen. The 19th-century play and its author became main focuses of his studies, and he once claimed to have acted in all parts, except for the female lead.

Rădulescu's involvement with Caragiale's prose was showcased on the big screen when, in 1963, he came to be praised for his role in Politică și... delicatese—adapted from Caragiale's stories, and directed by Haralambie Boroș. According to academic Cristian Stamatoiu, the film was partly an agitprop effort by the communist state, seeking to encourage readings of Caragiale as an anti-bourgeois ideologue, but also important in introducing Rădulescu, Rodica Tapalagă, Mihai Fotino, Puiu Călinescu and other youths who later helped in constructing a filmed corpus of Caragialesque works. The same year, he had a supporting role in Geo Saizescu's collectivization-themed comedy, Un surîs în plină vară. His early film credits also include the historical epic (and "semi-failure") Neamul Șoimăreștilor, completed by Mircea Drăgan in 1964. Therein, he was cast as Yeoman Lie. Late that year, he was in Saizescu's musical comedy, Dragoste la zero grade, starring Iurie Darie in the lead role. Critics were impressed less by the film, and more by Rădulescu's performance. Gheorghe Vitanidis employed him for another film project, Gaudeamus igitur. Columnist Călin Căliman disliked the film overall, seeing it as a collection of clichés, but reserved praise for the choice of actors in secondary roles. Rădulescu and Mircea Crișan were also tasked with providing comic relief in a road safety film, Cum să fim pietoni sau conducători auto model.

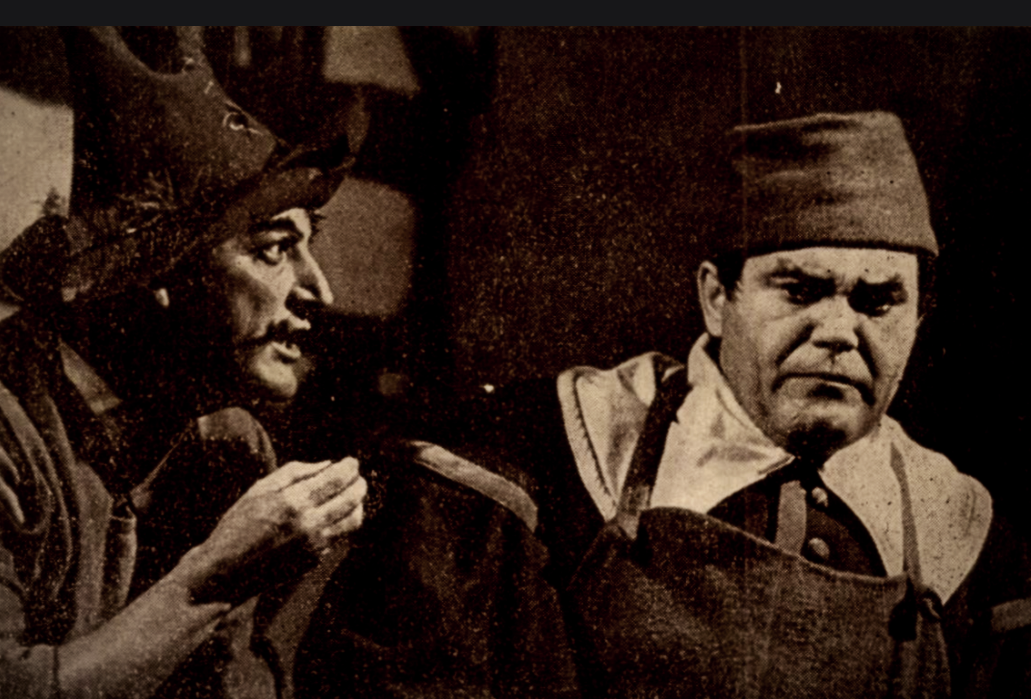
The Merry Wives of Windsor in the 1963 production: Victor Moldovan (Ancient Pistol) and Rădulescu (Frank Ford)

Rădulescu now worked directly with state television—in August 1963, he and Fotino worked together in the comedy bit Afaceri sigure (he was well-liked as an imbecile seeking to purchase a gravesite). At the TNB, he was lauded for his supporting roles in Baranga's Adam și Eva, opposite Fotino and Grigore Vasiliu Birlic, and in George Bernard Shaw's Millionairess, with Carmen Stănescu. By January 1964, he was noted by critic Florin Tornea for having created a nouveau riche and despotic Frank Ford in The Merry Wives of Windsor, as directed by Lucian Giurchescu. For the 1964–1965 season, he signed a temporary contract with the Comedy Theater, appearing in its parody version of Troilus and Cressida, as directed by David Esrig. He impressed Silvestru with his Ajax, "a mountain of haughty stupidity."

A lecturer at the IATC, Rădulescu directed his 1965 class, including Ovidiu Schumacher and Dorel Vișan, in an acclaimed rendition of Camil Petrescu's Mitică Popescu, done at the TNB Studio. By March 1965, he was doing sketch comedy on the state television network: he and Horia Căciulescu were mainstays of its taped variety shows, serialized as Varietăți. Late that year, he was assigned a secondary part in The Lace Wars, filmed in Romania by René Clair. Rădulescu then appeared in a supporting role in Sept hommes et une garce, by Bernard Borderie, which similarly mixed French and Romanian crews. Both films endure in cultural memory as an unusual, and in time scarcely believable, sample of cooperation between film industries on opposite sides of the Iron Curtain.

Rădulescu's selection as the lead character in Ion Băieșu's debut play, Ariciul de la Dopul perfect, generated controversy. On its 1966 premiere at Ion Vasilescu Theater of Giurgiu, Săraru questioned his technique, arguing that he was going for cheap effects and introducing licentious allusions that Băieșu could not have vetted. Băieșu himself noted that the play folded "before we could tell what was going on." Rădulescu received at least one poor rating for his role in Saizescu's 1966 film, La porțile pămîntului (from the house critic at Ramuri, who regarded him as both repetitive and superfulous). In late 1966, the TNB had him as the title character in Dinu Păturică (adapted by Ion Pillat and Adrian Maniu from a classical novel by Nicolae Filimon). Reviewers were unimpressed: Nicolae Carandino believed that he lacked the necessary depth, while Neculai Constantin Munteanu suggested that he had managed to reduce Dinu into "a garden-variety boor". Also then, Rădulescu took O scrisoare pierdută on the road, performing at the National Theater Iași. The event was lambasted by poet Alexandru Cerna-Rădulescu, who suggests that his namesake was overcome with shyness, embarrassing himself during dialogues with the more prestigious Alexandru Giugaru. He and Coca Andronescu also appeared in a education television series about famous literary characters, with a fragment from D'ale carnavalului. Their effort was panned in Contemporanul, who argued that their take on that play was "antiquated and stale".

=== Brigada Diverse period ===
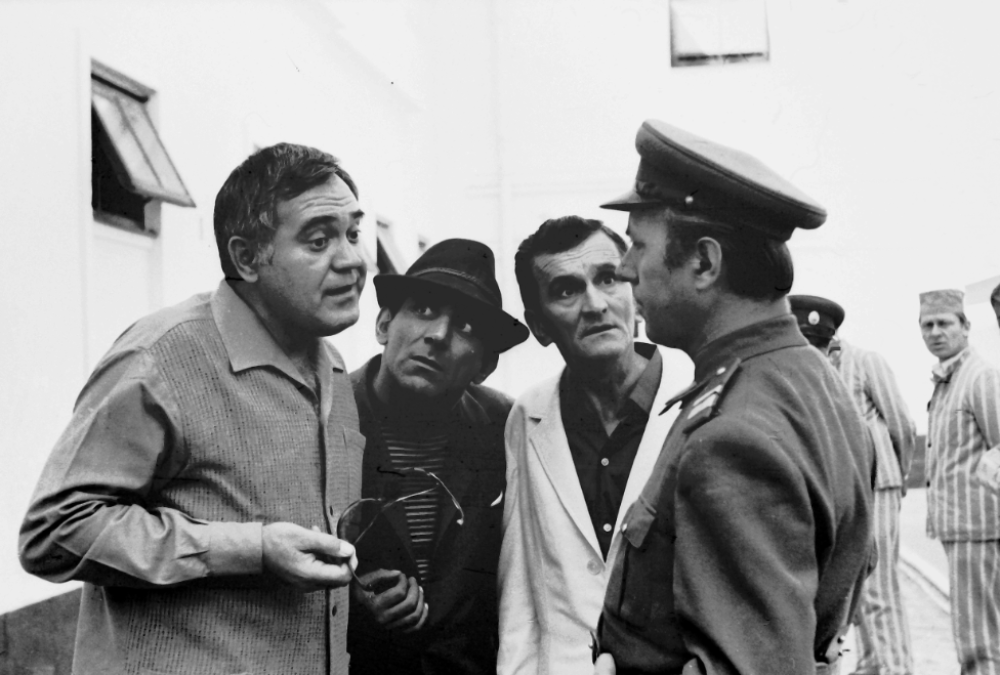
Rădulescu, Jean Constantin and Puiu Călinescu facing a militiaman, prison scene from Brigada Diverse intră în acțiune (1970)

In November 1967, Rădulescu was awarded the Order of Cultural Merit, fourth class, though his projects of the period were receiving additional negative feedback. Playing in cinemas at the same time, Virgil Calotescu's war drama, The Subterranean, was well-liked by critics, especially for its acting; according to critic Mircea Alexandrescu, Rădulescu was among the exceptions, merely contributing to "the film's more conventional part." Similarly, Corigența domnului profesor, directed by Boroș, had Rădulescu appearing alongside Toma Caragiu and other consecrated comedians, but reportedly failed to impress the public. It was regarded by moviegoers as conventional or outdated.

Other period contributions were similarly panned. Mircea Mureșan used Rădulescu's comedic talents in K. O., released in mid-1968. It was disliked by reviewers, who called it an "artistic involution", while noting that, despite having "the best comedians" at his disposal, "[Mureșan's] own script ruthlessly knocked them out." Later that year, Rădulescu was featured in Aurel Miheleș's Vin cicliștii, regarded by columnist Tudor Caranfil as entirely reliant on base physical comedy. Făclia newspaper called it a "lukewarm comedy" with an "ultra-simplistic" setting, suggesting that it should not have been filmed at all. He won over both the critics and the general public with his theatrical work. During 1969, he had a highly appreciated cameo in TNB stagings of Coana Chirița—using a classical text by Vasile Alecsandri, and with Beligan directing. He was however rebuked for his Stănică in a parallel dramatization of George Călinescu's novel, Enigma Otiliei, as directed by Cojar. Literary scholar Vicu Mîndra objected that he lacked the necessary emotional range.

As shown in a 1970 sociological survey by Pavel Câmpeanu, Rădulescu was the 13th most popular actor with several generations of theatergoers, but entirely absent from rankings provided by youths and intellectuals (who may have regarded him as entirely lowbrow). He had carried on with sketch comedy on state TV throughout the late 1960s. His presence in one such program, airing right after New Year's 1968, was panned by journalist Felicia Antip: she found the writing engulfed by "platitudes", and disliked it that the show had only featured a small number of actors and singers in a variety of roles. He was additionally a star of television plays, including as the pseudo-intellectual Pancrace in Molière's Mariage forcé (March 1968) and as a main character in adaptations from Lope de Rueda (October 1970). In February 1970, he was also set to perform in a live broadcast of Un nasture sau absolutul, by Radu Cosașu, but it was cancelled for technical reasons. Another medium he reached was the comedy album, with one of his humorous recitals released at Electrecord in early 1969.

Rădulescu was greatly loved by moviegoers for his recurring comedic role as Gogu Steriade in Drăgan's Brigada Diverse, a police-procedural series that began in early 1971 with Brigada Diverse în alertă!. Initially conceived as a lengthy project with some eleven feature-length episodes, it was stopped abruptly after only two more installments, allegedly because a high-ranking militiaman realized that his institution was the butt of the jokes. As noted in 2019 by critic Georgiana Mușat, Steriade's team of ne'er-do-wells, also comprising Patraulea (Jean Constantin) and Trandafir (Puiu Călinescu), subverted communist morality in their very on-screen depiction as likable social parasites. Despite the clampdown, they endured as one perhaps the most recognizable comedic trio in the history of Romanian cinema. The films as a whole were still regarded as unrefined in intellectual circles: Ștefan Oprea of Cronica rejoiced at their demise, calling them "almost deplorable"; according to Căliman, their survival as a cultural reference is owed to the subsequent decline in quality, which elevated by comparison "that which once seemed to be of questionable taste".

=== As Farfuridi, Dănilă, and Leonida ===
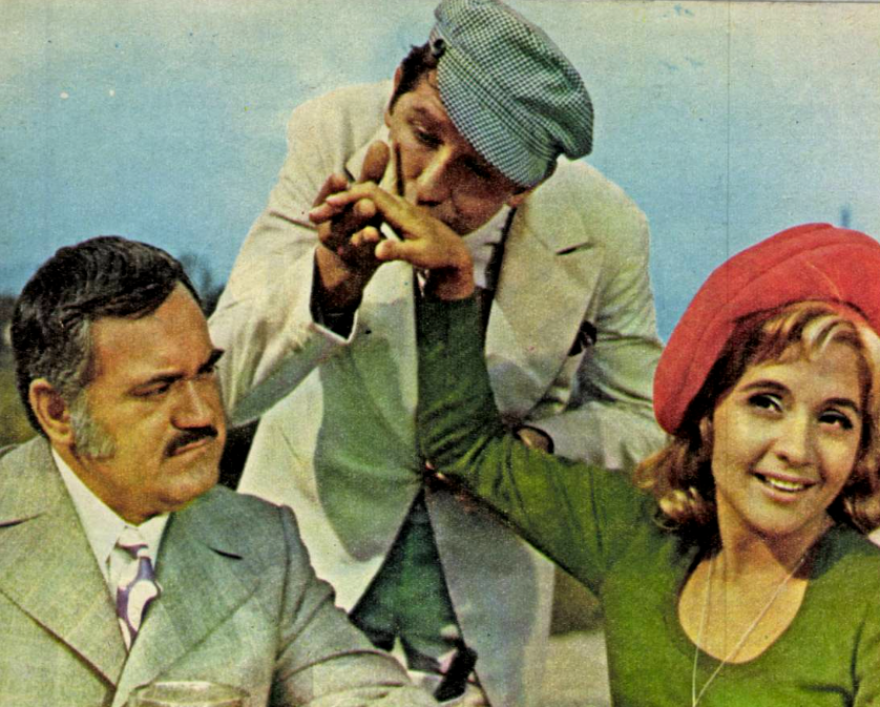
Rădulescu, with Sebastian Papaiani and Vasilica Tastaman, in Tonight We'll Dance at Home

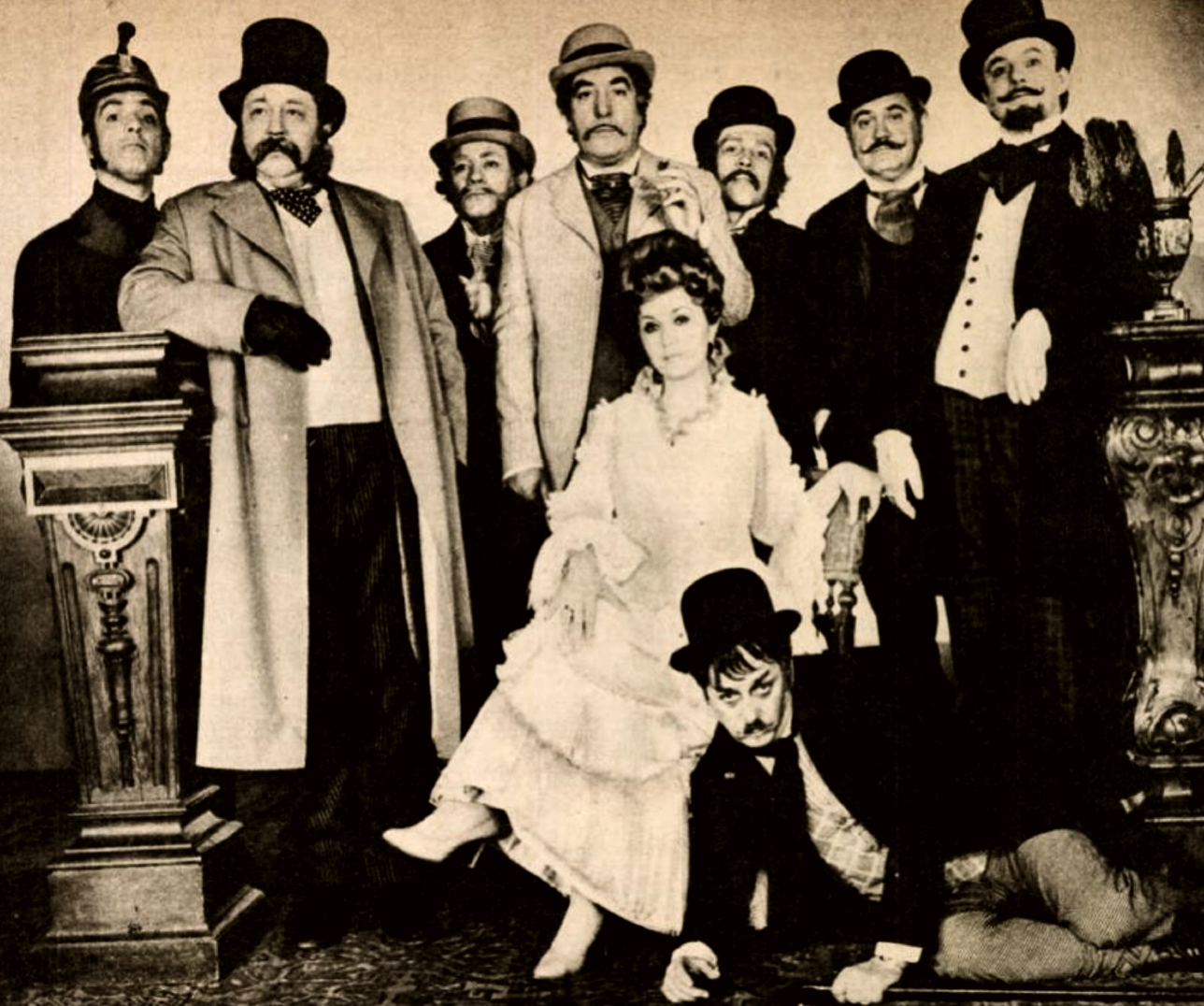
Cast of O scrisoare pierdutăin the Liviu Ciulei version of 1972. Standing, left to right: Ștefan Bănică Sr., Petre Gheorghiu, Ciulei, Toma Caragiu, Mircea Diaconu, Rădulescu, Octavian Cotescu; Rodica Tapalagă is sitting in the middle, with Aurel Cioranu reclining at her feet

Rădulescu shared credits with Sebastian Papaiani in Saizescu's Tonight We'll Dance at Home, for which he filmed on location in Turnu Severin during September 1971. He enjoyed his role as the serial seducer Temistocle Temistocle, calling the project "my dearest film". Oprea believed that his performance was somewhat overdone, seeing Papaiani as superior in his sidekick role; critic Eugen Tureschi contrarily appreciated his portrayal of Temistocle as a man of subdued harshness. Another seasonal release was Frații, by Mircea Moldovan, in which Rădulescu had a cameo as a peasant. In tandem, he directed his class of 1972 at the IATC Studio, with a modified version if Alexandru Mirodan's Celebrul 702. He himself took multiple roles in the production, some of them in travesti.

Rădulescu's take on O scrisoare pierdută was well-liked by director Liviu Ciulei, who took him on as Farfuridi in a 1972 production of the same play. He won praise for the comedic duo he formed with Mircea Diaconu (as Brânzovenescu): Rădulescu did Farfuridi as a "doubting" and "infantile" man, while Diaconu played his part as "humble [and] shy", a "tormented shadow" to the more visible Farfuridi. As noted in 1979 by critic Traian Șelmaru, Rădulescu managed to sabotage his "admirable" performance by continuously adding "hooks" (cârlige) in the subsequent stagings. He remained friends with Ciulei, claiming him as his admirer.

Throughout the early 1970s, Rădulescu was a regular voice actor for Ion Vova's Unda Veselă, the main comedic show on Radio Bucharest. In 1972, he had another highly popular role, as "the most combative tomcat", Dănilă, in the children's musical Veronica, created by Elisabeta Bostan. Mușat observes that, in a country where children's programming was scarce, "Veronica was everywhere—it was learned by heart by grandchildren, grandparents and parents alike." The schoolteachers' magazine Tribuna Școlii found that, while the film had failed in its educational purpose, Rădulescu's acting was among the elements which made Veronica unobjectionable. He earned additional praise for his contributions to entertainment shows on state television. By April 1972, he had joined Alexandru Bocăneț's team of actors and singers, with an end product that was described by playwright Dumitru Solomon as exceptionally good. In October, he gave a lengthy interview on boxing, which TV reviewers believed was pointlessly self-serving (for instance, by showing that Rădulescu had "been to foreign lands"), though still appreciating its moments of humor. As argued by journalist Sânziana Pop, another peak was reached in December 1972, when he co-hosted with Caragiu and Stela Popescu. He and Jean Constantin played the fumbling hosts of a New Year's party; Rădulescu was additionally noted for his physical comedy in a solo act, focused on his misadventures while changing a tire.

Rădulescu helped invent a touring variety-show formula which saw him share the stage with the various stars of neo-folkloric music, including Ion Dolănescu, and going with them on highly profitable national tours. In a 1975 interview, fellow actor Hamdi Cerchez brought up the quality of such performances, asserting that they were "under no definition artistic." The now-famous comedian was also called upon to provide live commentary during boxing matches aired on the same network, including Joe Frazier vs. George Foreman (January 1973). At the time, he was under contract with Ion Vasilescu Theater, being extolled by Mira Iosif for his on-stage romance with Marcela Rusu in Baranga's Fii cuminte, Cristofor!; Baranga himself found them to be his ideal actors in those roles. With Amza Pellea and Jean Constantin, he headlined a variety show at Constanța Stadium, within the Serbările mării festival of August 1973. Late that year, he was featured in a televised homage to Caragiale, which included filmed versions the Momente și schițe vignettes. He was celebrated as Mitică and (opposite Octavian Cotescu) as one of two "chums" with interchangeable names, though the show itself was panned as somewhat frivolous.

Rădulescu also appeared as Neagu in Drăgan's 1973 action film, Explosion, which had Beligan as the lead. Oprea described his effort there as superior, but also ill-suited to the sober narrative. Upon the start of 1974, Rădulescu was a Siguranța policeman in a TNB version of Baranga's communist play, Simfonia patetică (he was rated by Tornea as an "irresistible caricature"); he then starred as The Swaggering Soldier in a televised anthology of ancient Roman plays, though, as Solomon writes, he did not rise to the challenge. With Beligan and Marin Moraru, he recorded Leonid Andreyev's Rape of the Sabines, aired by Radio Bucharest. Rădulescu himself was especially proud of his titular role in Cojar's TNB version of Conu Leonida față cu reacțiunea, since this was the first recorded instance of the audience bursting out with laughter at that classical farce. Actor and theatrologist Călin Chirilă describes Rădulescu's Leonida as "[the scholar] Nicolae Iorga, but backwards". Silvestru lauded his "inexhaustible comedic fantasy", but observed that he had failed to understand Leonida as a "type", being in this inferior to his predecessors. In parallel, he was filming on Ion Popescu-Gopo's Poveste fantastică. Originally called Spionaj interplanetar, it had him as one of the main characters—a Martian robot spying on Earth's population. Columnist D. I. Suchianu was pleasantly impressed by this "very polemical" effort, and in particular by Gopo and Rădulescu's experiments with surreal humor.

=== 1970s fiascoes ===
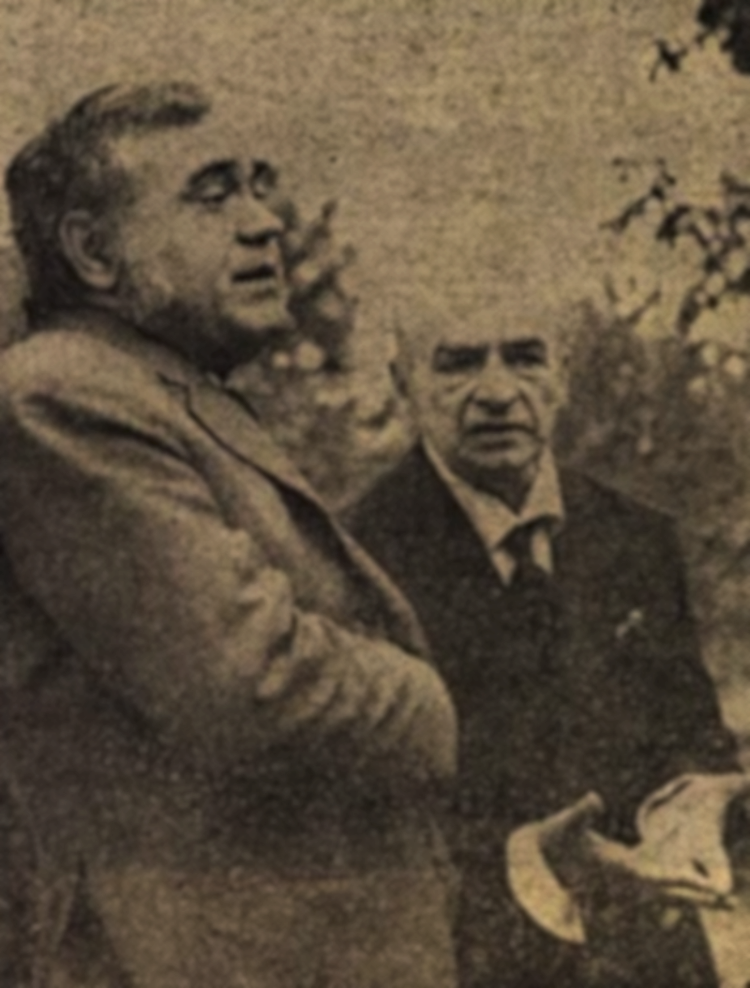
Rădulescu and Emil Botta in 1976

In the 1975–1976 theatrical season, Rădulescu was both a performer and dramaturge at the TNB. He and Jean Grossu co-wrote a stage version of The Good Soldier Švejk, with Rădulescu in the title role. Critics were unimpressed, suggesting that he had retained Švejk's "self-declared idiocy, and nothing of his fundamental humanity", and being put off by "his pulling faces and his onomatopoeias", imported in from the revue genre. He also shared directorial credits, prompting one anonymous reviewer to contend that he "lacks all talent as a director".

As a member of the Vasilescu troupe, Rădulescu was touring the country with a reprisal of Siciliana, reaching theaterless towns. The quality of his performance was slipping: as argued by the manager of Roman's house of culture, the acting was of "questionable taste", leading spectators to seek out other productions of Siciliana. The same was noted by writer and director Bogdan Ulmu, according to whom Rădulescu had failed Baranga's already questionable play, returning to it with "idiotic jokes" and "impardonable slips in matters of taste." Rădulescu was still with the permanent crew of radio's Unda veselă in 1976. By then, the program itself was said to have dramatically dropped in quality, and growing meaner, if imprecise, in its social satire. He was also a main contributor to the state television's New Year shows throughout the 1970s. His performance in the 1975–1976 edition was highlighted by Ileana Lucaciu-Colomieț, who noted that he still had the mark of a comedy genius.

Rădulescu joined ensemble casts for two films of late 1976. One was Premiera, a self-referential study in theatrical life. Co-created by Baranga and Mihai Constantinescu, it allowed him to share screen time with Emil Botta, the elderly tragedian. The other, called Serenadă pentru etajul XII, stood as a lighthearted ode to urban systematization, and was directed by Carol Corfanta. Released in December 1976, it came to be studied in later scholarship as a communist propaganda effort. The film was panned by contemporaries as well: Simelia Bron saw it as a failure, noting the unusually bad performance by its lead, Caragiu; Căliman also described it as a flop, suggesting that many of the comedic leads were miscast (Rădulescu was a "retarded orderly"). Released shortly after with much of the same cast, Tufă de Veneția was the first directorial credit of Petre Bokor. A collection of sketches by Valentin Silvestru, it reportedly annoyed the public by misusing the actors—despite Rădulescu's noted efforts at carrying portions of the project. It satisfied Oprea's exigence, who looked back on it as one of the few salvageable comedies of the 1970s. Suchianu also defended Tufă de Veneția overall, and further proposed that the sketch featuring Rădulescu alongside Ileana Stana Ionescu and Vasilica Tastaman was in all respects equal to Caragiale's prose.

As a lecturer at the IATC, Rădulescu directed his 1977 class' rendition of George Ciprian's tragicomedy, Man and His Mule, with Carol Erdős as the lead. It was badly received by Teatrul magazine, seen by its chroniclers as "incompatible with the good traditions of the IATC." Also then, he directed his students in a rendition of Hamlet. He was initially unresponsive to the harsh criticism it received, but became enraged when theatergoers began laughing at his effort, and once escorted one of them out of hall, grabbing the collar of his jacket. Rădulescu also maintained his own touring program: in April 1977, he did a stand-up routine at Brașov Opera, sharing the stage with Progresiv TM and Doina Spătaru-Olinescu. At Vasilescu Theater in July, he received good reviews as the Sheriff, in a staged version of The Front Page.

Rădulescu registered another flop with Fair Play, released in late 1977 as an educational film upholding ethics in football. According to Călin Stănculescu of Scînteia Tineretului, he was made to utter "the most inspid jokes", within a plot that was "scarcely believable". He was later a health inspector in Saizescu's 1978 comedy, Eu, tu și Ovidiu, which used music by Temistocle Popa; he played the antagonist to Florin Piersic, who was cast as a kindhearted hotel manager. Among the reviewers, Valerian Sava was unimpressed, noting that the lively humor of the film could not compensate for the poor writing, which had the inspector simply vanishing from sight toward the end of the film. Journalist Ecaterina Oproiu argued instead that the moviegoers were pleased to see Rădulescu "as they want him: a jovial misanthropist, perfidiously calm, a master at producing innuendo in the vernacular".

=== 1980s comeback ===
Critics found Rădulescu's improvisational comedy extremely well-suited to Să nu-ți faci prăvălie cu scară, by Eugen Barbu. Produced by the TNB, the show was also a hit with the public, reaching its 288th run in October 1978. He also appeared as his beloved Caragiale in an eponymous biopic about the aviation pioneer Aurel Vlaicu, released by Drăgan that same year. His cameo was less than two minutes long, prompting claims that he was only thrown in to sell tickets. Before the end of 1978, he shared the small screen with Beligan, Pellea and a young Horațiu Mălăele in Alecu Popovici's play, Examene. He agreed to star in a nostalgic collage film, the 1979 Expresul de Buftea. It had a screenplay by Matty Aslan, but also reused shots from earlier productions, selected for their humorous potential; according to Suchianu, the effort was of dubious taste. The same year, Ioan Grigorescu directed him in his project Brațele Afroditei, which critics viewed as utterly mediocre. The quality of television programming was also perceived as plummeting during the final years of the decade. Critic Constantin Radu-Maria argued that, for the 1978–1979 New Year's edition, Rădulescu and his partners only acted in mediocre sketches, their jokes "neither frequent nor amusing". The one moment that could wrestle viewers out of their torpor was a sequence in which Rădulescu karate-chopped a TV set. He also received scathing reviews for his regular sketches in the TV program Întîlnire cu satira și umorul. Already in 1980, journalist Cornel Nistorescu was describing this is a nadir in television entertainment, "making [Rădulescu] good money with all sorts of unfunny trinkets" (his verdict was replicated by others, who claimed Întîlnire as a permanent standard in failed comedy).

Rădulescu's return as the Inebriated Citizen, in Beligan's 1979 version of Caragiale's play, was unusual, in that he chose to do away with tradition and portray him as mostly sober and somewhat cunning. The show was panned by Șelmaru, who found him to be "hesitant"; it was still noted for using the untrained Jean Constantin as Pristanda, with Rădulescu effectively doubling as his acting coach. The two comedians shared the stage for a touring show, Ritmuri cu haz..., which was said to be extremely popular by the time of its run at Craiova (June 1980). Rădulescu filmed on another Saizescu comedy, the 1981 Grăbește-te încet. Done from Ion Băieșu's script, it was described by contemporary reviewers as enjoyable, but not truly a masterpiece. He had resumed his television work in early 1981, when he was cast as the hapless bureaucrat Mitrofan in Baranga's Sfîntul Mitică Blajinu. Scholar Doina Papp viewed the performance as historically significant, since it harkened back to the liberalization of the 1960s. She also highlights Rădulescu's contribution, which was largely based on facial expressions that the camera could linger on. Columnist Constantin Radu-Maria objected to his performance, seeing it as largely phoned-in. In June, the TV theater company had him star opposite Carmen Stănescu in Timbru rar, using a story by Carlo Montella.

Restoring his reputation as a professor with an acclaimed take on The Two Gentlemen of Verona (for which he shared directorial credits with Adriana Piteșteanu), Rădulescu had other victories as a film actor. He joined Saizescu's ensemble cast in Șantaj, with a minor, "picturesque" but accomplished performance. Al. G. Croitoru used him in another big-screen comedy, called Am o idee!, and released in July 1981 to favorable reviews. For New Year's 1982, television's core comedic team was changed—Rădulescu only appeared in archival reruns, which critics now saw as better than the newly taped show. The formula was preserved for New Year's 1983, which was explicitly aimed at younger audiences; Rădulescu was instead cast in an acclaimed radio version of Caragiale's Om cu noroc, produced by Vova with Beligan as the lead.

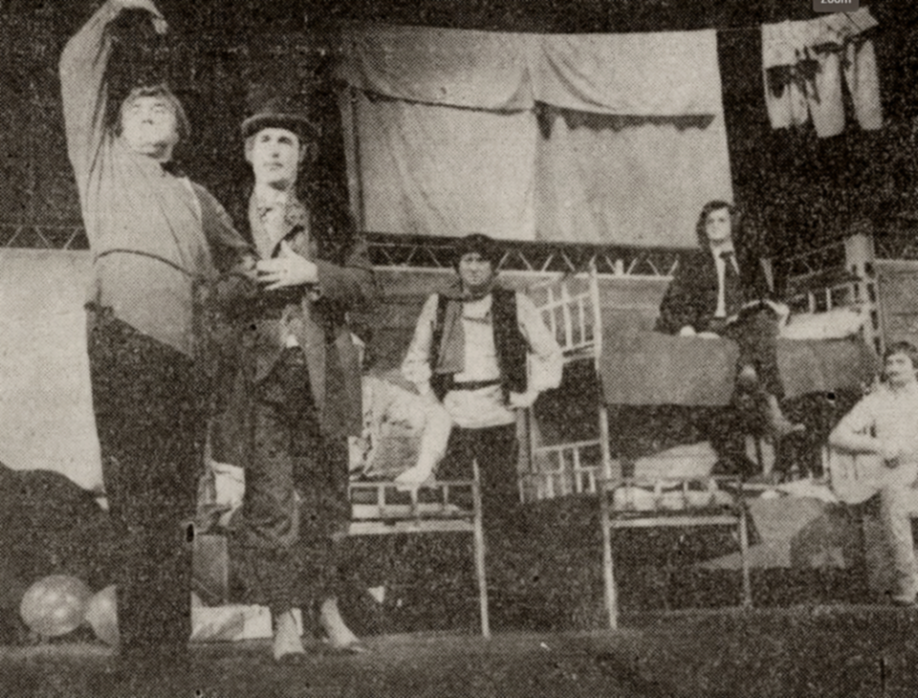
Scene from the 1982 season of The Bedbug, with Rădulescu (on the far left) and Gheorghe Dinică (standing to his side)

Horea Popescu directed Vladimir Mayakovsky's Bedbug, which had its premiere at the TNB in May 1982. Popescu's rendition, which was greatly successful, relied on a comedic compatibility between Rădulescu (Prisypkin) and Gheorghe Dinică (Bayan). Rădulescu's then-student, Maia Morgenstern, recalls being in awe of his Prisypkin, at once "tormenting in his sadness and irresistibly funny." He continued in the role to April 1987, when it went to Alexandru Arșinel. Boroș and Rădulescu resumed their collaboration with the 1982 Destine romantice, seen by Oprea as a forgettable film. Critic Roxana Pană reserved some praise for Rădulescu's performance as the ringmaster Sidoli in Elisabeta Bostan's Un saltimbanc la Polul Nord (released later in 1982, and loosely based on a children's novel by Cezar Petrescu). In early 1982, he was slated to appear at the TNB in Oh, What a Bloody Circus, by Eugène Ionesco, with Grigore Gonța directing. The production was abruptly terminated by communist censors after the previously lionized author publicly described the Romanian President, Nicolae Ceaușescu, as a dictator.

=== During late communism ===
In early 1984, Rădulescu was billed as a lead in András Sütő and Mircea Moldovan's satirical film, Bocet vesel. Though his name sold tickets, he had a rather small role, as an alcoholic, henpecked postman. A parallel project called Galax saw him teaming up with Gopo, for what film journalists praised as a charming and naive addition to Romanian science fiction. He was the secondary character of another satire, with Saizescu as director and Titus Popovici as screenwriter. Provisionally called Nuntă cu dar, it was released in 1984 as Secret of Bacchus. Rădulescu played Sterea, a corrupt and womanizing clerk who ends up in jail. He viewed himself as having achieved peak recognition in that context, with a random stranger handing him 25 lei as reward for his services (as was the custom with Lăutari performers), and with greengrocers offering him their produce for free. In May 1984, he was a guest of honor at a humor festival held at Băilești in memory of his recently deceased colleague, Pellea.

At the IATC, Rădulescu oversaw his graduates in productions of Nikolai Gogol's Marriage and Ciprian's Drake Head. He reduced Gogolian surrealism and emphasized instead the plot's absurdist philosophy, which, as critic Magdalena Boiangiu noted, made for a harmonious and promising show. She also praised the Drake Head, which had two student-directors (as well as introducing actors Morgenstern, Constantin Cotimanis, and Dan Puric). By 1986, Rădulescu had been cast as Mr. Poskett in a Bulandra Theater production of The Magistrate—a role he viewed as unique in that he made spectators laugh without ever laughing himself. He received an enthusiastic review from Teatrul's Victor Parhon, since, for Arthur Wing Pinero's style of comedy, he had given up on all the revue "tricks", reminding the public of his greatness as an actor. The production was a major hit, with over 900 runs over the following two seasons.

Rădulescu and Tamara Buciuceanu (as husband and wife) were teamed up with Mălăele (as their son) in Primăvara bobocilor, released in early 1987 as part of a satirical series by Moldovan. In this instance, the plot revolved around generational conflicts on a collective farm. Also then, he was an archeologist in Gopo's O zi la București, which was filmed as an homage to Romania's capital city. He also returned to the radio, in a musical version of Tudor Mușatescu's interwar play, Titanic Waltz; called Secretul succesului, it was aired in June 1988. In 1987–1988, Rădulescu was Bârzoi in a two-part filmed version of Alecsandri's Coana Chirița series—adapted for the screen by comedienne Draga Olteanu Matei, who was also the titular character. As Căliman notes, both episodes were largely carried by the talents of its "natural born comedians", Rădulescu included. Journalist Octavian Andronic reports that the film was enormously successful, not least of all because of Rădulescu's "savory" immersion into the role, with its thick Moldavian accent. By contrast, Ateneu magazine viewed his speech as inauthentic, and commented negatively on his "superficial humor".

Rădulescu was growing critical of Ceaușescu's personality cult. He once tested the cultural authorities by mock-volunteering to recite a pro-Ceaușescu poem at the state art festival, Cîntarea României; they instantly rejected him, fearing that his very presence would undermine its solemnity. Continuing to play Farfuridi at the TNB in 1988–1989, he reportedly modified some lines of the original text to introduce discreet mockery of state socialism. As "The Cardinal", he lent his voice to Uimitoarele aventuri ale muschetarilor, a feature-length cartoon (it was produced in early 1988 by Victor Antonescu and Animafilm). He also had a cameo in Muzica e viața mea, a documentary about nightclub singer Gică Petrescu. In July 1988, he appeared at Craiova Central Stadium in a staged exhibition football match, opposing his actors' team (also including Arșinel, P. Călinescu, Mălăele, Ștefan Bănică Sr., and George Mihăiță) to a 1974 Universitatea squad.

Invited back on national television for New Year's 1989, Rădulescu was acknowledged by Căliman as "liv[ing] up to his reputation as 'the great comic'". In mid-1989, he directed his class, including Alexandru Bindea, in Teodor Mazilu's Mobilă și durere. The project earned praise from Luceafărul's Radu Anton Roman, who commended Rădulescu's understanding of Mazilu's "difficult" text, as well as for his tact in navigating "the sharp edge [between] comedy and drama". Autumn 1989 brought the cinema run of Secretul armei... secrete!, an anti-war fairy tale by Alexandru Tatos. Its large comedic cast, supporting the more conventionally dramatic protagonists, included Rădulescu. His performance was viewed by critics as one of the film's charms.

=== Post-1989 transition ===
The Romanian Revolution of December 1989, which toppled communism, also introduced several changes in the cultural and social context. This evolution was signaled in television programing: the national station could not produce a new show for New Year's 1990, and instead aired old sketches featuring Rădulescu and other consecrated actors. As compensation, it provided segments that had been banned under communism. From 1990, Rădulescu was also free to visit Western countries, a special guest on live shows aimed at the Romanian diaspora. He claimed that he was offered, but refused, permanent employment in Tel Aviv and (on George Emil Palade's intercession) at Yale.

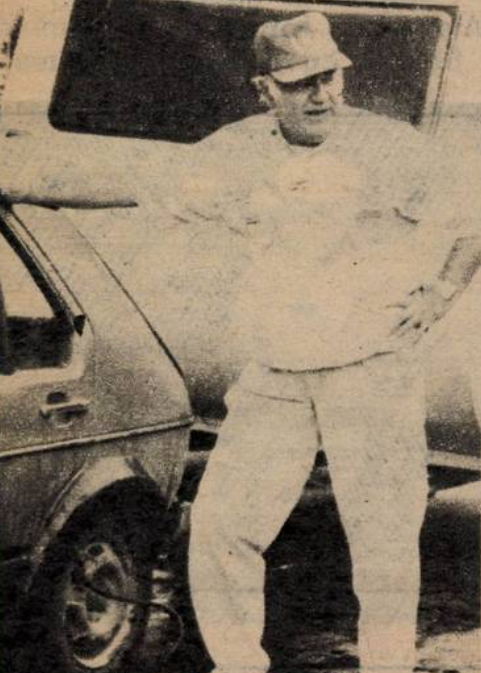
Rădulescu filming on Harababura, October 1990

At home, he headlined the spring 1990 TNB season, finally appearing in alongside Marin Moraru in Ionesco and Gonța's Oh, What a Bloody Circus, which could now be performed freely. He also embarked on a brief political career. Initially affiliated with a satirical "Party of Free Change", he handed in his resignation from that group just ahead of the May 1990 general elections. He presented himself on a list of the "Party of Democratic Unity", a republican and anti-socialist group, seeking a Senate seat for his native Vîlcea County. His attempt to also register for Bucharest's senatorial list was blocked by the municipal tribunal just days before the vote. In a 1993 interview, Rădulescu argued that the post-revolutionary transition to capitalism had made him into a "sad man", and that the country itself was like a battered boxer. He still hoped that the trend would be met by solidarity between citizens, for the greater good, and by the cultivation of artistic values. He later explained that he resented the new levels of Westernization in post-communist Romania, regarding its products as slavish and anti-artistic.

A variety show guest-starring Rădulescu was taped to a live audience at Sala Palatului, and hosted in February 1991 by the national station, rebranded as TVR 1. In this instance, he opted to appear as his childhood hero, Constantin Tănase, and told similar jokes. In October, Rădulescu joined Olteanu Matei, and the revue stars Arșinel and Stela Popescu, for another such production, now held at Arena Polivalentă. The four were in-character as two pairs of "co-parents-in-law" to a young couple, itself formed by musical guests Anca Țurcașiu and Cătălin Crișan. He had also resumed his film career with the role of a senator in Saizescu's sex comedy and road film, Harababura. In a 2017 overview, critic Costi Rogozanu argued that the plot was merely serving to validate as much lewdness as possible, adding: "The scenes featuring broken-down Dacia cars and Dem Rădulescu assailed by sexy young ladies seem to be never-ending." Reviewer Daniel Bucos was likewise poorly impressed by the "docile" humor and the gratuitous nudity, but commended Rădulescu for maintaining a higher standard of acting.

The year 1992 witnessed Rădulescu's major success in televised drama, with a more highbrow effort: TVR 1 produced its own repertory version of Titanic Waltz; Dinu Cernescu was called in to direct him as the main character, Spirache. According to Contemporanul columnist Marina Săndulescu, he excelled at it and was thus rescued from oblivion, also allowing the play itself to be rediscovered and quoted by the post-revolutionary public. During July 1992, he was at Costinești for a special production of Take, Ianke și Cadîr, by Victor Ion Popa. Also starring seniors such as Beligan, Ion Lucian, and Mihai Fotino, it was welcomed by Silvestru as a major cultural event.

=== Mid-1990s galas and Musca ===
During the early 1990s, TVR 1 specialized in reruns of its communist-era bits, often featuring Rădulescu in his prime. After one such segment aired during the national day on 1 December 1992, critic Gabriela Hurezean objected: "TVR is gently asleep, with reruns of shows that we didn't even like the first time around." Later that month, Rădulescu and Mădălina Manole hosted a Saint Nicholas Day gala at Iași. In an accompanying interview, he described himself as "too old" for politics, and noted that he was leaving the political game to other actors-turned-politicians (namely, Ion Caramitru and Sergiu Nicolaescu). In 1993, TVR 1 had him resuming the role of Leonida, with Leopoldina Bălănuță as his wife. It earned the appreciation of critics with its intricate character study, its production values, and its hints about the political events of 1989. He was considered for the role of Trahanache in a planned filmed version of O scrisoare pierdută, as announced by Mircea Cornișteanu; at the time, he expressed hopes that he would be also asked to study for the role of Pristanda, which had once been recommended to him by Baranga. In October, his students appeared at the freshman prom for the School of International Economic Relations (REI), with a comedy show that the youth paper Tineretul Liber described as "rather vulgar".

For New Year's 1994, Rădulescu taped audio sketches alongside Popescu and Arșinel. These were aired on Radio România Actualități and Radio România Cultural; the program also included the radioplay Povești de carnaval, recorded years earlier by Rădulescu and Octavian Cotescu from Alecsandri's texts. He was additionally cast, with Jean Constantin and others, in the 1994 sex comedy A doua cădere a Constantinopolului—with critic Adina Darian describing his performance there as comparable to some of his best earlier work. By February 1994, he was a regular in the nightclub circuit, starring alongside Nicu Constantin, Nae Lăzărescu and Rodica Popescu Bitănescu in a series of adult-oriented shows that also involved erotic dancers. In October, Radio Tineret premiered its adaption of Mr. Kettle and Mrs. Moon, with Rădulescu in a main role. He returned to the REI freshman ball for its December 1994 edition, when he entertained the public with a stand-up routine that alluded to Romanian profanity. The same month, he joined Lăzărescu, Mălăele and Laura Stoica for a gala at Sala Palatului, honoring the successful national football squad. His reputation was harmed in February 1995, when he slapped a younger colleague, Costin Mărculescu, who had allegedly propositioned Rădulescu's mistress. Mărculescu announced that he would sue, demanding either a public apology or 20 million lei in reparations.

During the mid-1990s, Rădulescu agreed to do a number of TV ads, satisfying his craving to "have the camera glance at me." Promoting herbal tea, they were noted by critic Florin Dumitrescu alongside those by Jean Constantin, who was a spokesman for vodka; as Dumitrescu notes, though Rădulescu's brand was non-alcoholic, he seemed to be equally rosy. During 1995, he had a one-man satirical show, Musca ("The Fly"), airing on Tele7ABC. It was purchased by Pro TV, but his contract with that station was abruptly suspended in early 1996; as explained by Rădulescu himself, this sacking was caused by rumors that he had joined a political group not aligned with Pro TV's own agenda; elsewhere, the group was named as the Democratic Party. Rădulescu issued a strong denial of this claim, threatening to sue Cartelpress, which he had identified as a fabricator of fake news. Since Cartelpress was based in Oltenia region, Rădulescu informed the public that he could no longer view himself as an Oltenian; he also stated his deep dislike of political life, calling politics "a whore".

After his clash with Pro TV, Rădulescu returned on Tele7ABC. It produced his new edition of Musca, which he was still contributing in November 1996. Also then, he resumed a series of tours in Western Europe and the United States, but complained about his increasing fear of flying. At around the same time, he was headlining Cabaret politic, a series of live shows on Romanian Radio. The same company included him in a readers theater version of Tudor Popescu's play, Milionar la minut. Critic Maria Laiu, who attended the staging, found the whole effort pointless, since the taping was done without clarity, and the staging lacked all the necessary props; however, she acknowledged that the performing troupe, led by Buciuceanu and Rădulescu, garnered genuine laughter.

Again recruited by TVR 1 in late 1996, Rădulescu was the host of its New Year's program, which doubled as a retrospective of all such previous shows. New segments of the show included his duet with Jean Constantin, from a script by Dan Mihăescu. Seen by Badea as excellent, it was peppered with musings about social relations before and after 1989. Upon the start of 1997, his name was fraudulently used to advertise a peagant called Țiganca de aur, leading him to threaten its impresario with a lawsuit. In November, he wad touring with the Constantin Tănase Theater, reaching Craiova—though an outsider, he was again the show's leading attraction. In an interview for the local press, he claimed that he was set to film on a new comedy, scripted by Dinu Săraru.

=== Final years ===
Since 1973, Rădulescu had been in a relationship with actress Adriana Șchiopu, whom he married "about 1984". They had a daughter, Irina Rădulescu, aged twelve in 1998, when the three of them inhabited a country house in Otopeni. In early 1998, he was touring the United States with a variety show called Veselia salvează România. In June, his UNATC class was invited to perform at Cotroceni Palace, with a selection of texts from Sławomir Mrożek. During summer, he traveled around the Romanian Black Sea resorts with a series of revue shows, having also served on examining commissions at the UNATC, the Ecological University, and Hyperion. Also in 1998, Rădulescu sat down for an in-depth TVR 1 interview with critic Eugenia Vodă, which clarifed aspects of his biography and outlook on life. Building on his earlier metaphor of Romania as a battered boxer, he now declared that the country was "comatose". He also expressed bemusement, rather than anger, at finding himself "cursed at in the newspapers".

Though the Vodă interview showed Rădulescu as being thankful for his good health, his career was hampered by hypertension, in turn caused by stress and weight gains. Additionally, Rădulescu had smoked regularly, and in the 1980s had a penchant for the Bulgartabac brand. During his final years, he was noticeably tired, but ignored his family's pleas to "at least give up on the radio." In October 1998, he was rescued by the staff of Colentina Hospital after a near-fatal hypertensive urgency, which had resulted in pulmonary edema and a myocardial infarction. Days later, he issued statements condemning the press for its coverage of his health, calling the reporting a "base fabrication", and indicating that he was in fine shape.

At New Year's 1999, Rădulescu performed at Continental nightclub in Timișoara, declaring that he no longer intended to be associated with televised holiday programs, since these had become excessively bawdy. On several occasions, he expressed admiration for the comedy troupe Divertis, which he regarded as a laudable exception. He was still planning a return to the big screen, and also announced that, since 1996, he had completed a teleplay, for which he sought financing. Explaining at one point that it was for a series based on Brigada Diverse, he claimed to be in production talks with Antena 1, and that he had optioned Radu Gheorghe as his lead. In March 1999, he was granted an award by national radio, recognizing him as one of the institution's "golden voices". At the time, he was appearing with Popescu, Arșinel and various others on posters advertising a "sexy" Mărțișor gala. The TV version of Milionar la minut, again starring Rădulescu, was the debut play at TVR 1's theatrical Thursdays, inaugurated in September 1999.

In December 1999–January 2000, the aging actor was performing for his Romanian Canadian fans in Hamilton and Toronto. By the time of his return, television stations were airing ads for the Romanian People's Bank, which showed Rădulescu entrusting them with his savings. According to journalist Ion Cupan, this venture was in itself a sign of cultural decline after communism: Rădulescu advertised "suspicious banks" as a supplement to his state pension, whereas lucrative TV jobs went to a "plethora of ham actors, of the kind that would have otherwise carried his luggage on his tours". The enterprise was virtually insolvent after a bank run in June 2000, allowing for speculation that his own finances had been affected.

During July, Rădulescu had resumed his seaside performances at a venue in Mamaia. According to a note in Jurnalul Național, his stand-up routine there was unquotably ribald, and overall unfunny. Upon the end of summer, Rădulescu was taking a break and traveling for pleasure. He suffered a fatal heart attack on the afternoon of 10 September 2000, while being driven by a friend through Telega. His final words, uttered as he was stepping out of the car, were comments on the freshness of the mountain air. He was transported to a hospital in Câmpina, but could not be resuscitated, and died on the spot; in some records, his death place is provided as Bucharest.

== Legacy ==
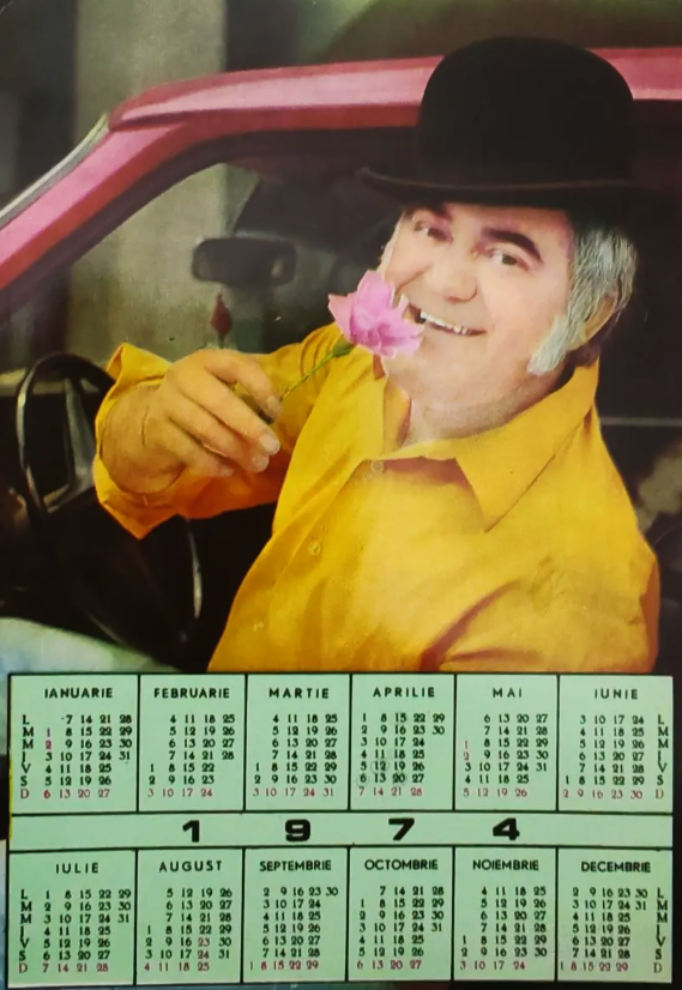
1974 calendar featuring Rădulescu in a comedic pose

Rădulescu's body was picked up by his widow, then laid in state at the TNB, where homages were paid by actors such as Buciuceanu, Maia Morgenstern, Mihai Fotino and Alexandru Bindea, as well as by singer Maria Dragomiroiu and poet Mircea Dinescu. A letter of condolences was sent in by President Emil Constantinescu, reading:

For more than 40 years, Dem Rădulescu has been synonymous with Romanian theater, has lived both its dramas and its victories. But, above all, this great actor has come to personify comedy. He gave us, with his unmistakable charm, the power to laugh. [...] Now, as we are being separated from our great actor, we are given to live through the only moment of disconcert and pain that he has ever produced.

An Orthodox funeral service was performed at Icoanei Church, before burial at Bellu Cemetery. The latter ceremony, held on 13 September, was attended by some 500 mourners, including former students. As a professor at the UNATC, Rădulescu had been a mentor to some ten graduate classes; he took pride in ensuring that they were not "crooked people", while expressing some regret over his "authoritarian" harshness in ensuring their professionalism. In a 1996 interview, he himself had nominated a group of his most successful students: Morgenstern, Olga Bucătaru, Emil Hossu, Dorina Lazăr, Dan Puric, Anca Sigartău, and Rodica Tapalagă. Puric dedicated his rendition of Don Quixote, taken up by the TNB in early 2005, to the memory of his teacher.

The actor's inheritors included daughter Irina. Hoping that he would share his passion for stamp collecting, Dem had decided to bequeath her his stamp albums, said to have included rarities. Aged 13 at the time of his death, Irina later chose a career in acting. The UNATC department headed by her father went to his former assistant George Ivașcu, who also held on to a suitcase that Rădulescu was carrying at the time of his death.

Rădulescu endures in cultural memory especially for his Caragialesque portrayals. In a 2002 piece, scholar Mircea Ghițulescu honored him as one of the most accomplished Caragiale actors. The monumental complex sculpted in the 2000s by Ioan Bolborea, and erected outside the TNB, features Caragiale and several of his characters, one of which borrows Rădulescu's physical features. The Brigada Diverse series, as well as other similar projects that carried ostensive references to the old regime, continued to enjoy popularity into the 2010s. According to historian Adrian Cioroianu, this was not a relevant measure of communist nostalgia, but rather showed an apolitical, aging public seeking to relieve its youth.

By 2007, Saizescu was putting out Harababura magazine, which granted annual prizes—one named after Rădulescu. Around then, a Dem Rădulescu Boulevard was being designed and constructed in Râmnicu Vâlcea's Ostroveni area. Within ten years, it had become noted for its concentration of new residential skyrise. An anthology of Rădulescu's state-television numbers was released in 2009 by TVR Media, in DVD format. His voice was sampled by Paraziții, a political hip-hop crew, on their 2010 LP, Tot ce e bun tre' să dispară. Since March 2016, he was memorialized by a star on the Bucharest Walk of Fame. In December 2019, a statue of the late actor was added to the "Alley of Comedians", which is part of the Bucharest Comedy Theater complex. Irina was invited to the unveiling, expressing joy that the monument was also in close proximity to St. Demetrius–Poștă Church, itself honoring her father's patron saint. His likeness was also preserved in a caricature by fellow actor Horațiu Mălăele, first included in a 1995 album.
