= Tonight We'll Dance at Home =

- Directed by: Geo Saizescu
- Screenplay by: Virgil Moise
- Starring: Dem Rădulescu; Sebastian Papaiani; Vasilica Tastaman; Stela Popescu; Draga Olteanu Matei; Ștefan Mihăilescu-Brăila; Violeta Andrei
- Cinematography: George Cornea
- Music by: Temistocle Popa
- Production company: Buftea Studios
- Release date: 1972
- Running time: 1h 38min
- Country: Romania
- Language: Romanian

Tonight We'll Dance at Home (Romanian: Astă-seară dansăm în familie) is a 1972 Romanian comedy film directed by Geo Saizescu.

The film portrays the travels around the country of two sentimental swindlers, Temistocle T. Temistocle (Dem Rădulescu) and Alecu A. Alecu (Sebastian Papaiani), who present themselves as respectable people and ensnare female victims of various ages, from whom they manage to obtain large sums of money in exchange for promises of marriage.

== Production ==
The film, written by Ion Băieșu in collaboration with director Geo Saizescu, was produced during the summer of 1971, with principal photography taking place between September and November of the same year across various locations including Turnu Severin, Brașov, Poiana Țapului, the Black Sea coast, and Buftea.

In the spring of 2010, Cătălin Saizescu, the son of director Geo Saizescu, released a mastered version of the film in HD format with 5.1 sound.

== Cast ==
- Dem Rădulescu – Temistocle
- Sebastian Papaiani – Alecu
- Vasilica Tastaman – Mimi
- Ioana Bulcă – Blonda
- Stela Popescu – Stela
- Draga Olteanu Matei – Lăcrămioara
- Mariella Petrescu – Alice
- Violeta Andrei – Gina
- Emilia Dobrin – Mimi's relative
- Margareta Krauss Silvestrini – Mary
- Tamara Crețulescu – Corina
- Nineta Gusti – Marioara
- Ștefan Mihăilescu-Brăila – Cristache
- Maria Voluntaru — Suzana Pitulice
- Fory Etterle – Bebe
- Geo Saizescu — Bizarul
- Mircea Mureșan — Stela's husband
- Nucu Păunescu
- Petre Gheorghiu
- Gheorghe Naghi
- Temistocle Popa
