= Walk of Fame Bucharest =

Romanian project honoring actors

Coordinates: 44.430752°N 26.104012°E

- Aleea Celebrităților (in Romanian)
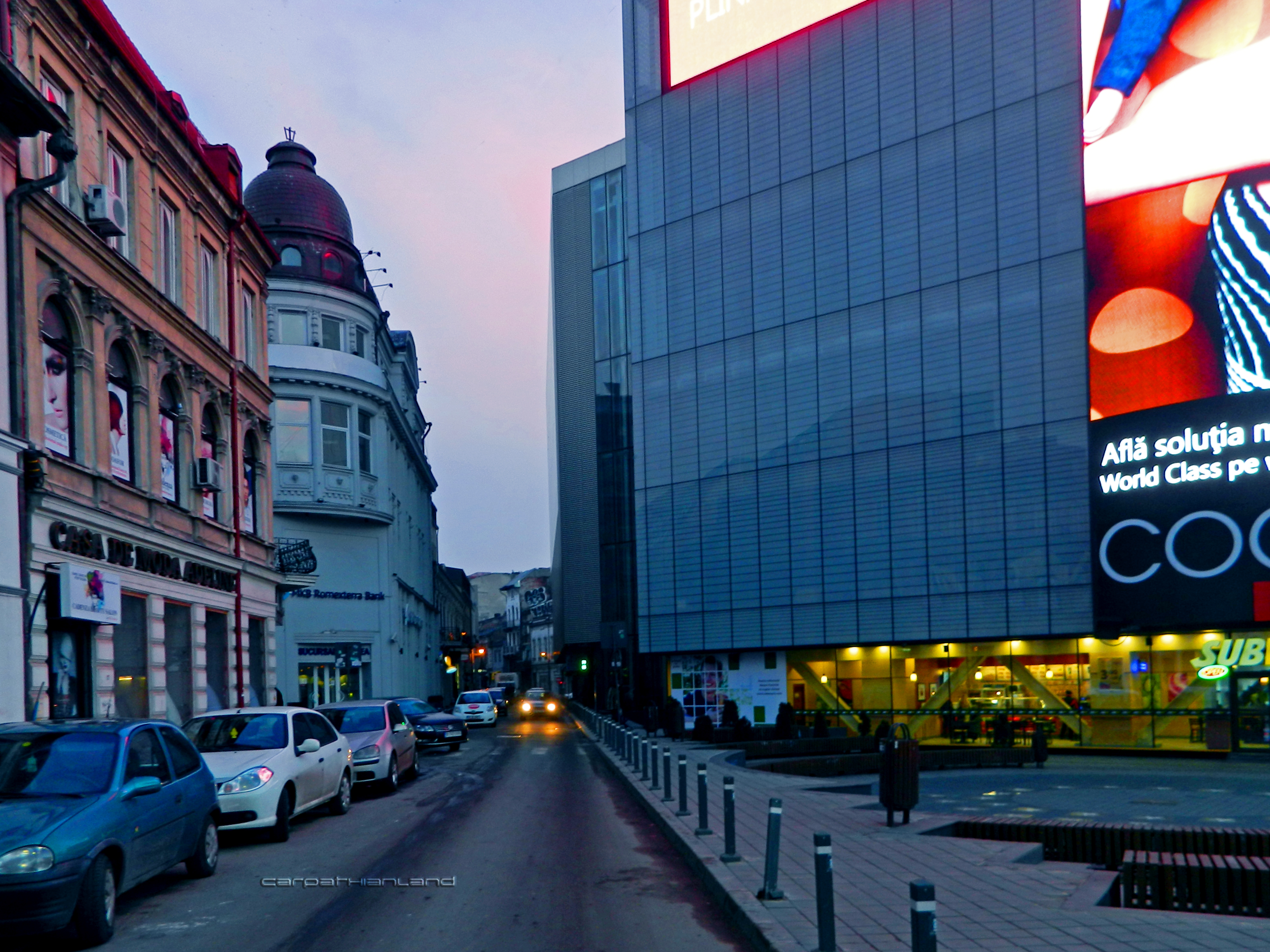
- Walk of Fame on the right
- Established: January 30, 2011
- Location: Times Square, Bucharest
- Type: Entertainment walk of fame
- Directors: Founder Dan Bărbulescu, CEO Cocor
- Curators: George Ivașcu, Teatrul Metropolis

Walk of Fame (Romanian: Aleea Celebrităților) is a project organized by Cocor and Metropolis Theater. The actors thus honored receive a star on the boulevard in Time Square (Romanian: Piața Timpului), in Bucharest, Romania. The criterion for choosing actors depends on the month in which they were born. The project is similar to the Hollywood Walk of Fame, in Los Angeles, United States. The Walk of Fame was inaugurated on January 31, 2011.

== List of honored actors ==
1. Florin Piersic (b. 1936) – January 31, 2011
2. Victor Rebengiuc (b. 1933) – February 10, 2011
3. Radu Beligan (1918–2016) – March 27, 2011
4. Amza Pellea (1931–1983) – April 7, 2011
5. Maia Morgenstern (b. 1962) – May 1, 2011
6. Alexandru Tocilescu (1946–2011) – July 7, 2011
7. Tamara Buciuceanu (1929-2019) – September 4, 2011
8. Sebastian Papaiani (1936–2016) – September 29, 2011
9. Ileana Stana-Ionescu (b. 1936) – September 29, 2011
10. Draga Olteanu Matei (1933-2020) – October 29, 2011
11. Mircea Albulescu (1934–2016) – October 29, 2011
12. Mariana Mihuț (b. 1942) – November 27, 2011
13. Stela Popescu (1935–2017) – December 14, 2011
14. Ion Caramitru (1942-2021) – March 29, 2012
15. Ștefan Iordache (1941–2008) – April 9, 2012
16. Iurie Darie (1929–2012) – June 1, 2012
17. Marin Moraru (1937–2016) – June 1, 2012
18. Ion Luca Caragiale (1852–1912) – June 9, 2012
19. Horațiu Mălăele (b. 1952) – August 2, 2012
20. George Mihăiță (b. 1948) – October 20, 2012
21. Costel Constantin (b. 1942) – October 20, 2012
22. Liviu Ciulei (1923–2011) – December 13, 2012
23. Ion Lucian (1924–2012) – December 13, 2012
24. Emil Hossu (1941–2012) – December 13, 2012
25. Șerban Ionescu (1950–2012) – December 13, 2012
26. Alexandru Arșinel (b. 1939 - d. 2022) – May 30, 2015
27. Ion Dichiseanu (1933-2021) – May 30, 2015
28. Sergiu Nicolaescu (1930–2013) – May 30, 2015
29. Valeria Seciu (b. 1939) – June 27, 2015
30. Ion Besoiu (1931–2017) – June 27, 2015
31. Rodica Mandache (b. 1943) – June 27, 2015
32. Florina Cercel (1943-2019) – March 5, 2016
33. Adela Mărculescu (b. 1938) – March 5, 2016
34. Rodica Popescu Bitănescu (b. 1938) – March 5, 2016
35. Dem Rădulescu (1931–2000) – March 27, 2016
36. George Constantin (1933–1994) – March 27, 2016
37. Ștefan Bănică Sr. (1933–1995) – March 27, 2016
38. Dinu Manolache (1955–1998) – March 27, 2016

== See also ==
- List of halls and walks of fame § Walks of fame
