= Sebastian Papaiani =

Romanian actor

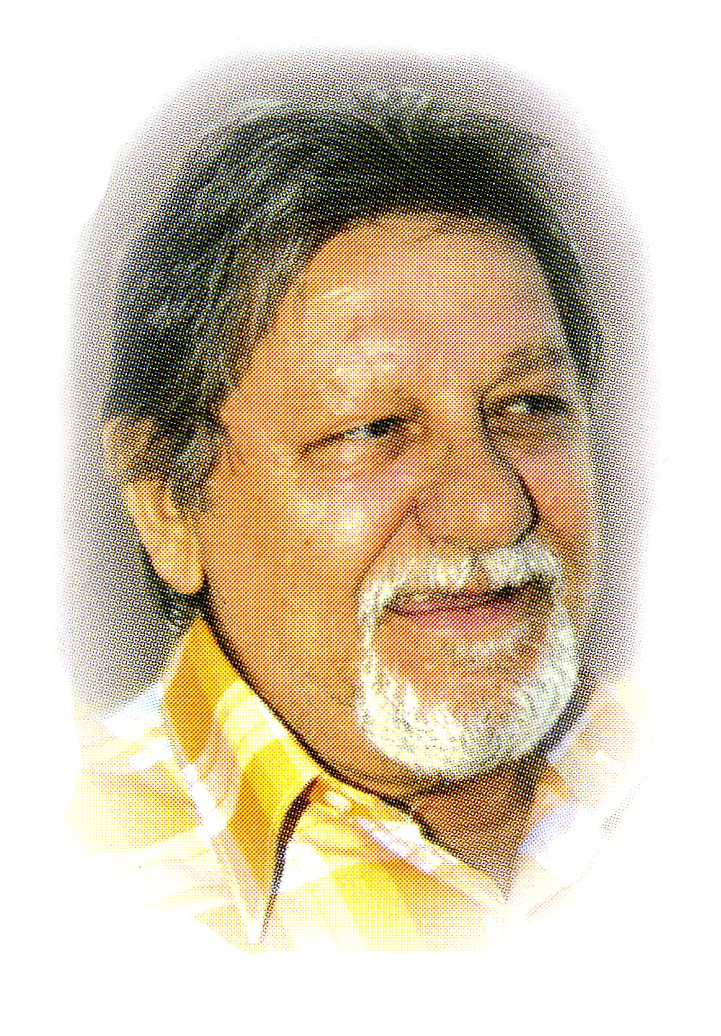
- Born: Sevastian Papaiane; 25 August 1936; Pitești, Kingdom of Romania
- Died: 27 September 2016 (aged 80); Bucharest, Romania
- Resting place: Bellu Cemetery, Bucharest
- Education: Theatrical Arts and Cinematography Institute
- Occupation: Actor
- Years active: 1963–2016
- Spouses: Eugenia Giurgiu Papaiani (m. 1961; div. 1973) Marcela Papaiani (m. 1973)
- Children: Sebastian, Alkys
- Awards: National Order of Faithful Service

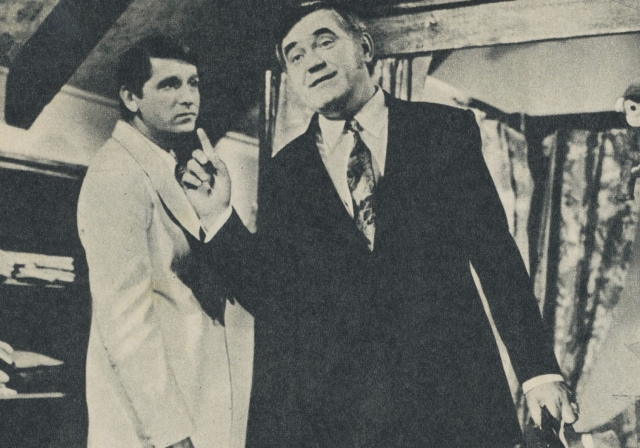
Papaiani and Dem Rădulescu starring in the 1972 film Tonight We'll Dance at Home (Romanian: Astă-seara dansăm în familie)

Sebastian Papaiani (Romanian pronunciation: [sebastiˈan papaˈjani]; 25 August 1936 – 27 September 2016) was a Romanian film and television actor.

== Biography ==
He was born in Pitești; his father was of Greek origin. He graduated from the Theatrical Arts and Cinematography Institute in 1960, debuting in the Geo Saizescu comedy Un surâs în plină vară (1963). He has a star on the Walk of Fame Bucharest.

In December 2002 he was awarded by then-President Ion Iliescu the National Order of Faithful Service, Knight rank. In 2014, Poșta Română issued a 1.60 lei stamp in his honor, part of the "Golden Stars of the Stage and Screen" series.

His first wife was actress Eugenia Giurgiu, whom he married in 1961; two years later, the two had a son, Sebastian Jr, but they divorced in 1973. He then remarried Marcela Papaiani, with whom he had another son.

Papaiani died at his home in Bucharest at age 80, after suffering a stroke, and was buried in the city's Bellu Cemetery.

== Selected filmography ==
Film
| Year | Title | Role | Director |
|---|---|---|---|
| 2010 | Moștenirea | Mircea Istrate Sr. | Iura Luncașu |
| 2008 | Nimeni nu-i perfect | Mr. Predescu | Dragoș Moștenescu |
| 1986 | The Graduates | Mihai's father | Nicolae Corjos |
| 1985 | The Ring | Announcer | Sergiu Nicolaescu |
| 1979 | Uncle Marin, the Billionaire | Gogu lu Pupăză | Sergiu Nicolaescu |
| 1979 | The Moment | Petre Nobilu | Gheorghe Vitanidis |
| 1976 | Roșcovanul | Lampă | Francisc Munteanu |
| 1975 | Stephen the Great - Vaslui 1475 | Ionuț Jder | Mircea Drăgan |
| 1975 | Frații Jderi | Ionuț Jder | Mircea Drăgan |
| 1975 | Toamna bobocilor | Pompei | Mircea Moldovan |
| 1975 | Zile fierbinți | Guriță | Sergiu Nicolaescu |
| 1974 | Păcală | Păcală | Geo Saizescu |
| 1973 | Ultimul cartuș | Ilie Oarcă | Sergiu Nicolaescu |
| 1973 | Ciprian Porumbescu | Voronca | Sergiu Nicolaescu |
| 1972 | Cu mâinile curate | Fane Oarcă | Sergiu Nicolaescu |
| 1972 | Tonight We'll Dance at Home | Alecu | Geo Saizescu |
| 1971 | B.D. la munte și la mare | Sgt. Căpșună | Mircea Drăgan |
| 1971 | Brigada Diverse în alertă! | Sgt. Căpșună | Mircea Drăgan |
| 1971 | Facerea lumii | Officer | Gheorghe Vitanidis |
| 1970 | Brigada Diverse intră în acțiune | Sgt. Căpșună | Mircea Drăgan |
| 1970 | Asediul | Chiru | Mircea Mureșan |
| 1969 | Căldura | Olteanul | Șerban Creangă |
| 1967 | Diminețile unui băiat cuminte | Fane | Andrei Blaier |
| 1967 | Balul de sâmbătă seara | Papă-Lapte | Geo Saizescu |
| 1966 | Fantomele se grăbesc | 2LT Mihai | Cristu Polucsis |
| 1965 | La porțile pământului | Romi | Geo Saizescu |
| 1965 | Gaudeamus igitur | Mihai Gliga | Gheorghe Vitanidis |
| 1964 | Un surîs în plină vară | Făniță | Geo Saizescu |
| 1963 | Partea ta de vină | Mihai Brad | Mircea Mureșan |
