= A Bomb Was Stolen =

1961 film

- Film Poster (from Czechoslovakia)
- Directed by: Ion Popescu-Gopo
- Written by: Ion Popescu-Gopo
- Starring: Eugenia Balaure
- Cinematography: Ștefan Horvath
- Music by: Dumitru Capoianu
- Release date: 23 January 1962
- Running time: 65 minutes
- Country: Romania
- Language: Romanian

A Bomb Was Stolen (Romanian: S-a furat o bombă) is a 1962 Romanian dialogue-free spy film directed by Ion Popescu-Gopo. It was entered into the 1962 Cannes Film Festival.

== Plot ==
The film begins with a nuclear bomb test. One of the bombs is stolen by gangsters, who hide the bomb in a bag. Inept police pursue the gangsters, and the bag containing the bomb is lost, and recovered by a passerby who does not know what's in the bag. The passerby goes about his day with the bag, pursued by the gangsters who are in turn pursued by the police.

== Reception ==
The international press praised this film. In the English press, A Bomb Was Stolen received the label “an exuberant comedy” (Eric Shorter, Daily Telegraph, 25 August 1962), "a subtle and frequently hilarious satire" (Satiră din România, Edinburgh Evening News, 30 August 1962), "a satirical fantasy" (Bomba, Daily Worker, 3 September 1962). The Soviet journalist I. Surkova, writing for Sovetskaya Kulture, considered the film “full of witty jokes.”

== Cast ==
- Eugenia Balaure
- Haralambie Boroș
- Horia Căciulescu
- Puiu Călinescu
- Iurie Darie
- Cella Dima
- Florin Piersic
- Tudorel Popa
- Geo Saizescu
- Ovid Teodorescu
- Liliana Tomescu
- Jean Dănescu
- Ștefan Niculescu-Cadet
- Lak Popescu
- Draga Olteanu-Matei (as Draga Olteanu)
- Ion Bondor
- Ion Atanasiu Atlas
- Emil Botta as Somerhot (as Emil Bota)
- Nelly Sterian
- Dumitru Hitru
- Nicolae Motoc

== Awards ==
In May 1962, the film participated at the International Film Festival in Cannes, being nominated for the official Palme d'Or Award.

- It got several awards:
- Merit Diploma at the New Europe Film Festival in Edinburgh (1962)
- Third Prize at the International Film Festival in Thessaloniki (September 1962)
- The Special Prize of the Jury “Silver Olive” at the International Festival of the Comic and Humorous Comedy, Palazzo del Parco, Bordighera (1963)
- Honorary diploma at the Vienna Film Festival

== See also ==
- List of science fiction comedy films
