= Cernica Monastery =

Romanian Orthodox monastery

- Mănăstirea Cernica
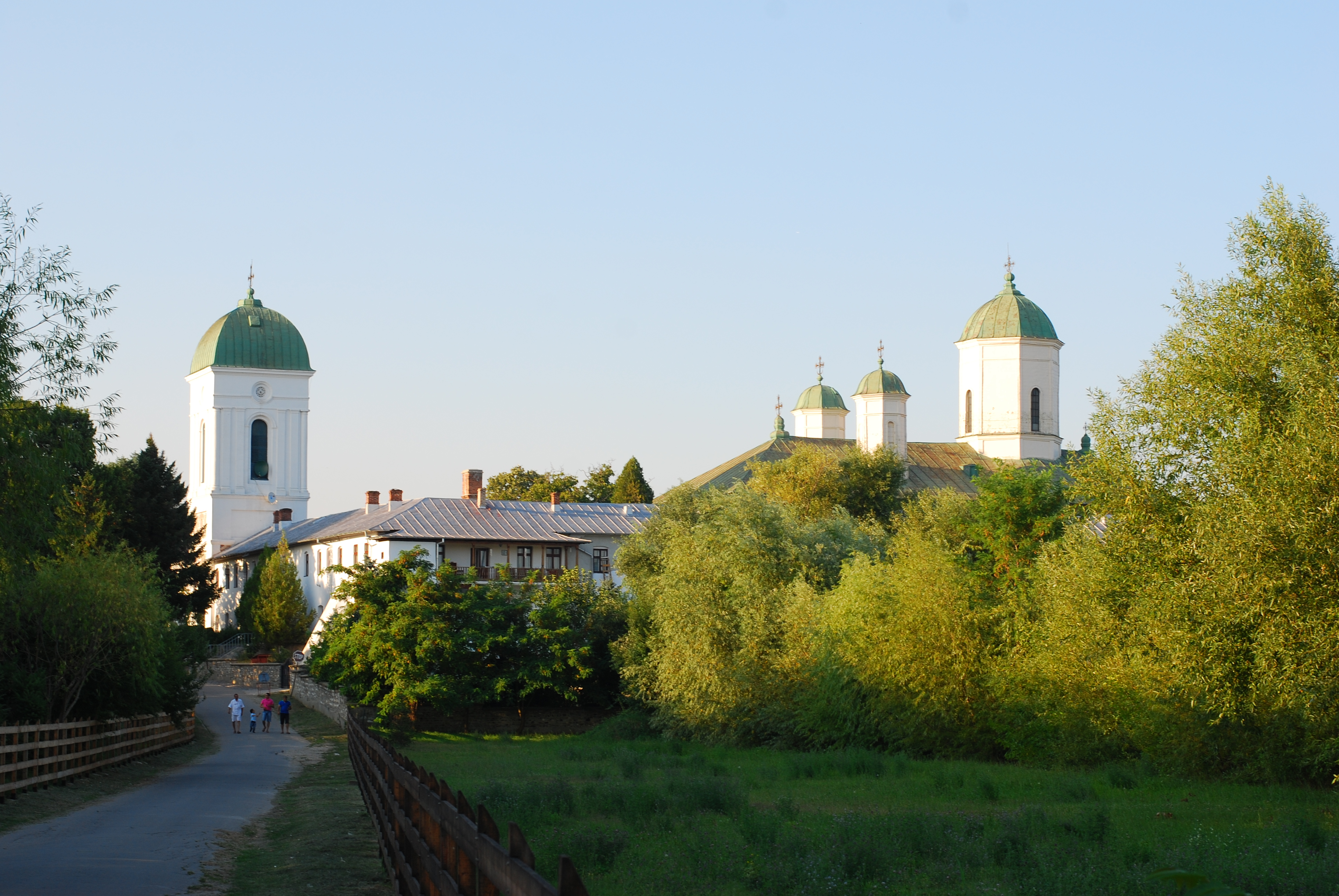
- Cernica Monastery in 2011

- Location within Romania
- Interactive map of Cernica Monastery

Monastery information
- Denomination: Romanian Orthodox
- Established: 1608

People
- Founders: Cernica Știrbei, High Vornic of Michael the Brave

Architecture
- Style: Neoclassicism
- Completion date: 1608

Site
- Location: Pantelimon, Ilfov County
- Country: Romania
- Coordinates: 44.434792°N 26.258588°E
- Public access: yes
- Website: manastireacernica.ro

Cernica Monastery (Romanian: Mănăstirea Cernica) is a Romanian Orthodox monastery located on the shore of Lake Cernica. Situated in Ilfov County, just outside Bucharest, it is part of Pantelimon town. It is listed as a historic monument.

== History ==
Cernica Monastery, established in 1608 during the reign of Radu Șerban, was founded by Cernica Știrbei, the great vornic of Michael the Brave, and his wife, Chiajna. This monastic complex has been a significant center of monastic education. Within the monastery grounds, three churches and three chapels have been constructed.

The main church, dedicated to Saint Nicholas, suffered damage during the 1802 earthquake and was repaired between 1809 and 1815 by Archimandrite Timotei. A major restoration was undertaken in 1925 following another earthquake in 1838 that caused the collapse of a turret, and a fire in 1923.

The church dedicated to Saint George was originally built in the 18th century by Dan Brașoveanu. It was completely rebuilt between 1962 and 1964, and further consolidated after the damages from the 1977 Vrancea earthquake.

In 1804, Archimandrite George constructed the small Church of Saint Lazarus within the monastery's cemetery.

The three chapels of the monastery are "The Dormition of the Mother of God," built in 1790, "Saint John," constructed in 1842, and "The Entrance into the Church."

Between 1900 and 1904, the poet Tudor Arghezi was a monk at Cernica Monastery. The cemetery of Cernica Monastery is the final resting place of many Romanian personalities, including painter Ion Țuculescu, Metropolitan Nifon, theologian Dumitru Stăniloae, writer Gala Galaction, orientalist Athanase Negoiță, sociologist Ernest Bernea, pianist Johnny Răducanu, singer Zavaidoc, actress Stela Popescu, director Geo Saizescu, translator Stelian Gruia, academician Emilian Popescu, broadcaster Marioara Murărescu, and politician Pan Halippa.

== Description ==
The church is built in Neoclassical with Romanian decorative elements.

The architecture of the monastery features monumental churches with trilobed plans, lateral apses, and prominent domes. Structures like the Church of Saint Nicholas and the Church of Saint George are built with strong masonry columns that support the vaults of the nave and narthex, highlighting a traditional ecclesiastical architectural style.

The Church of Saint Lazarus, located in the monastery's cemetery, is notable for its rich external decorations. It exemplifies the traditional monastic architectural style that combines functionality with spiritual aesthetics, characteristic of Orthodox Christian architecture.

== Gallery ==
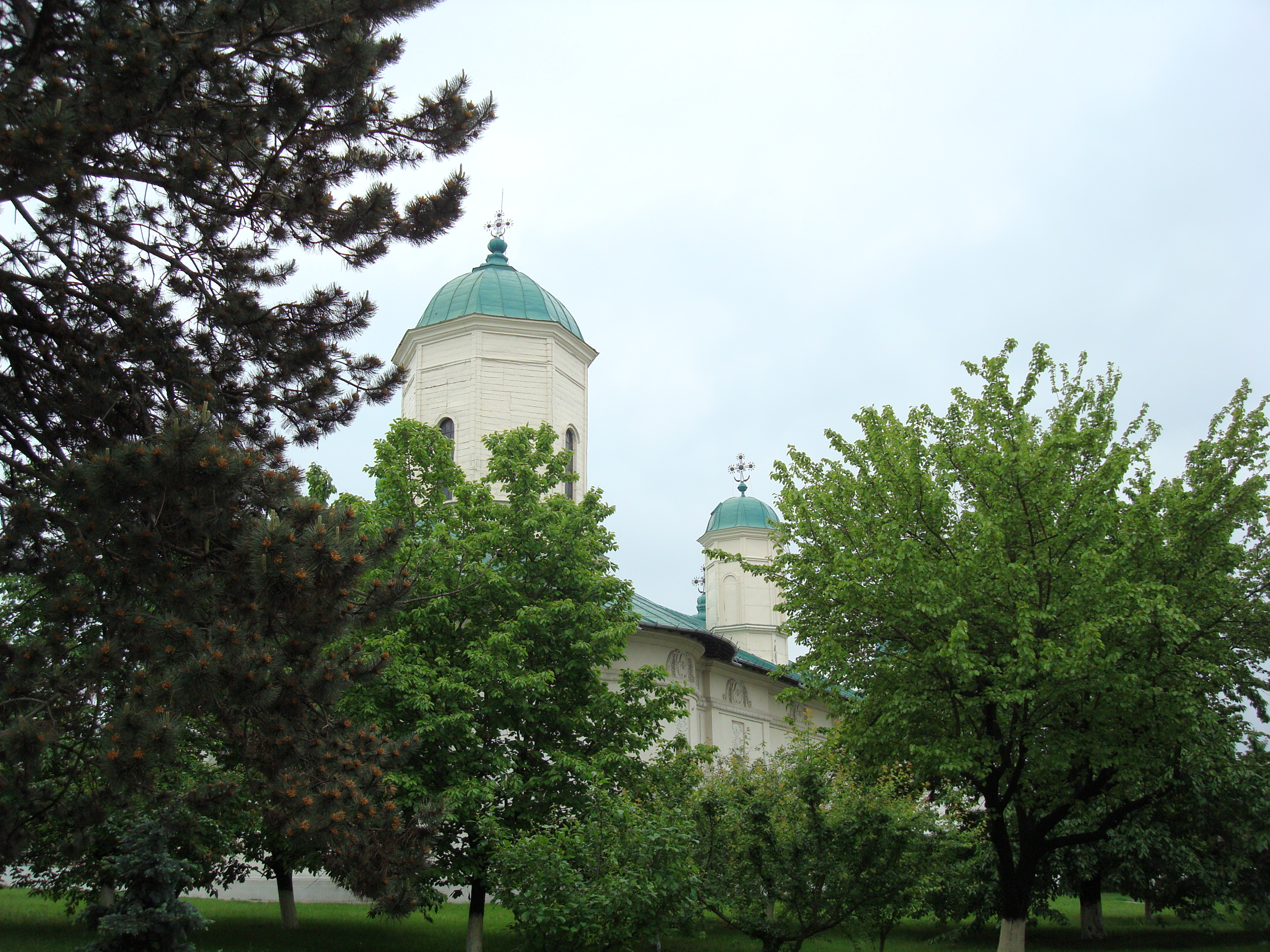

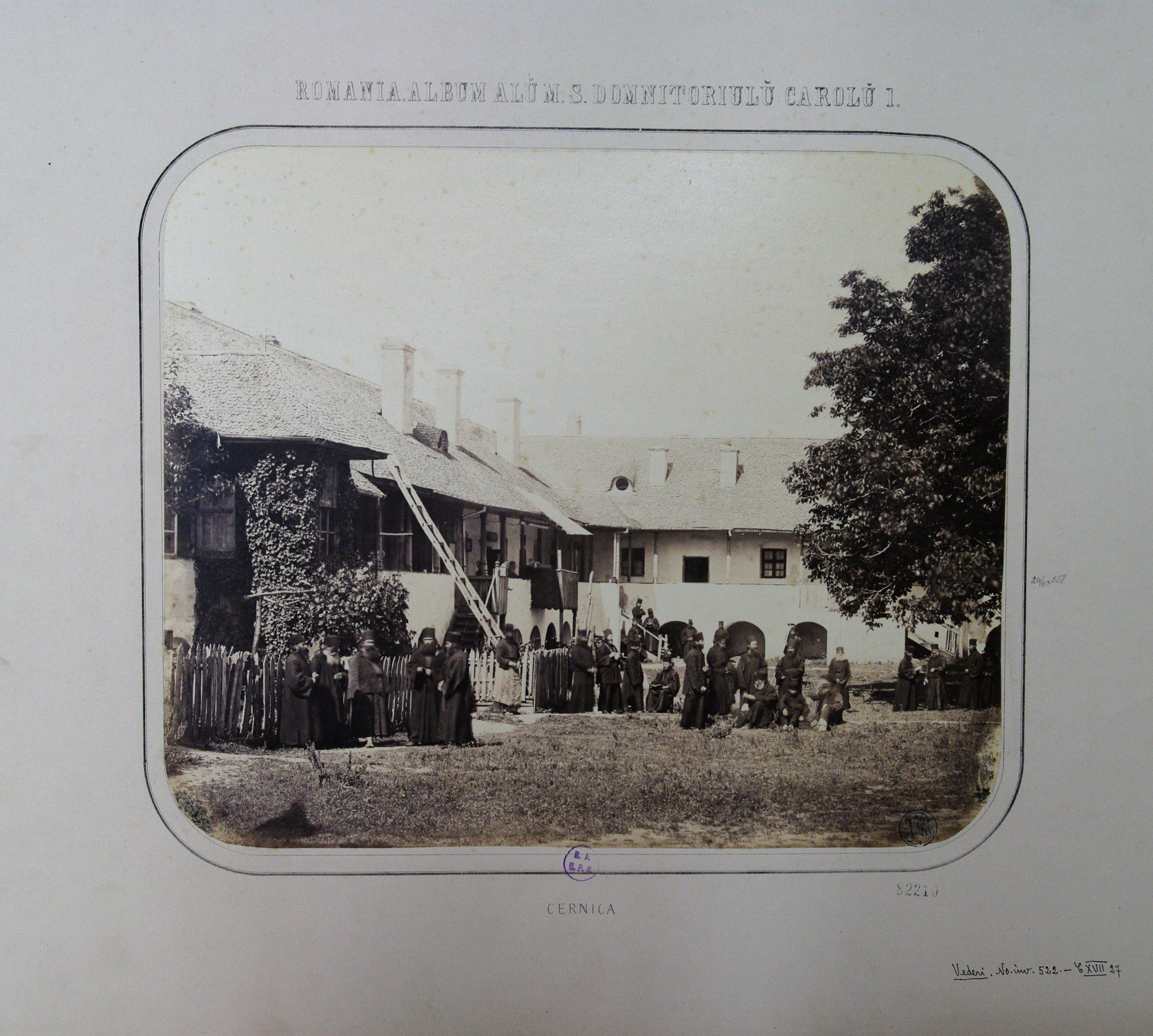

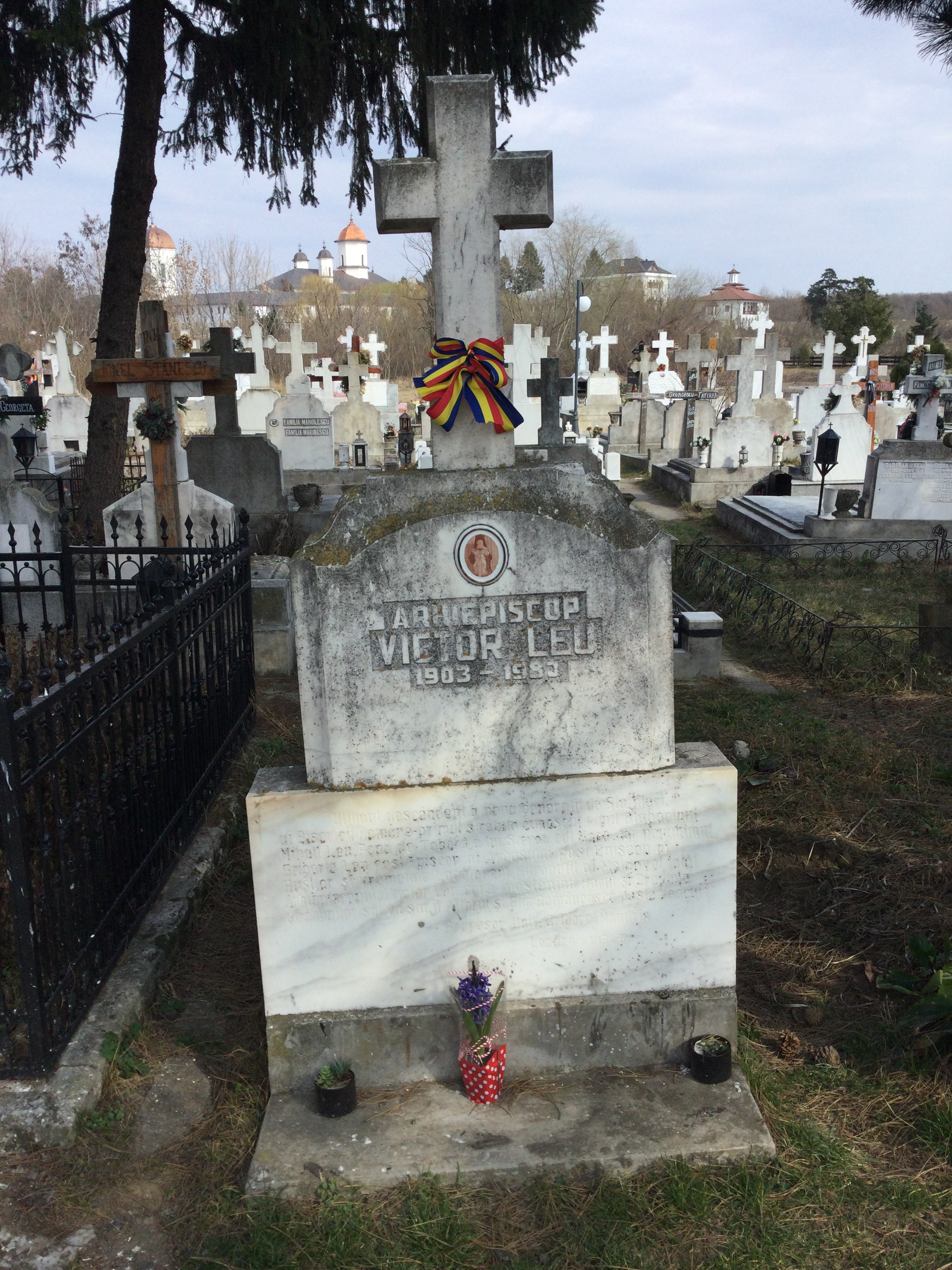

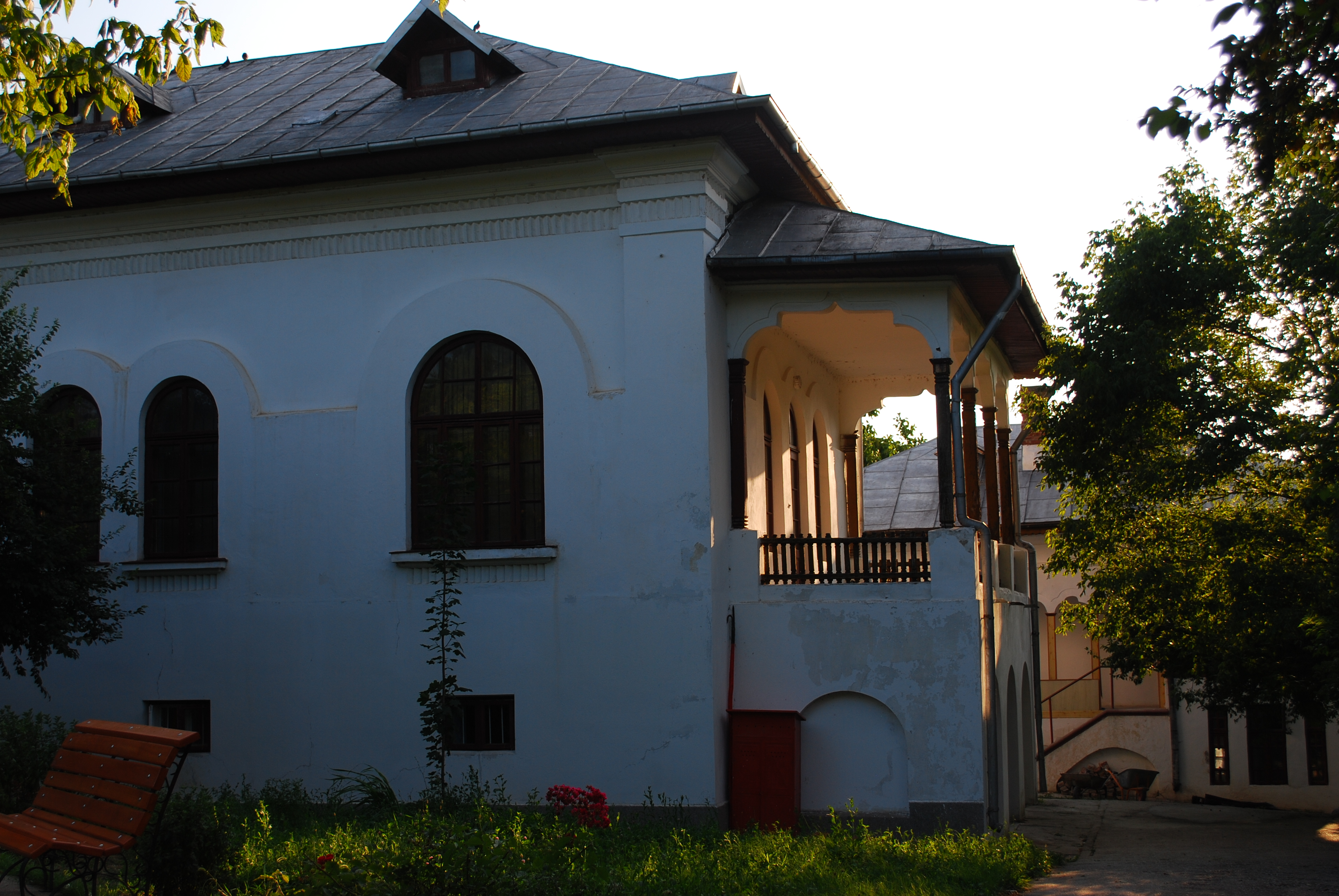

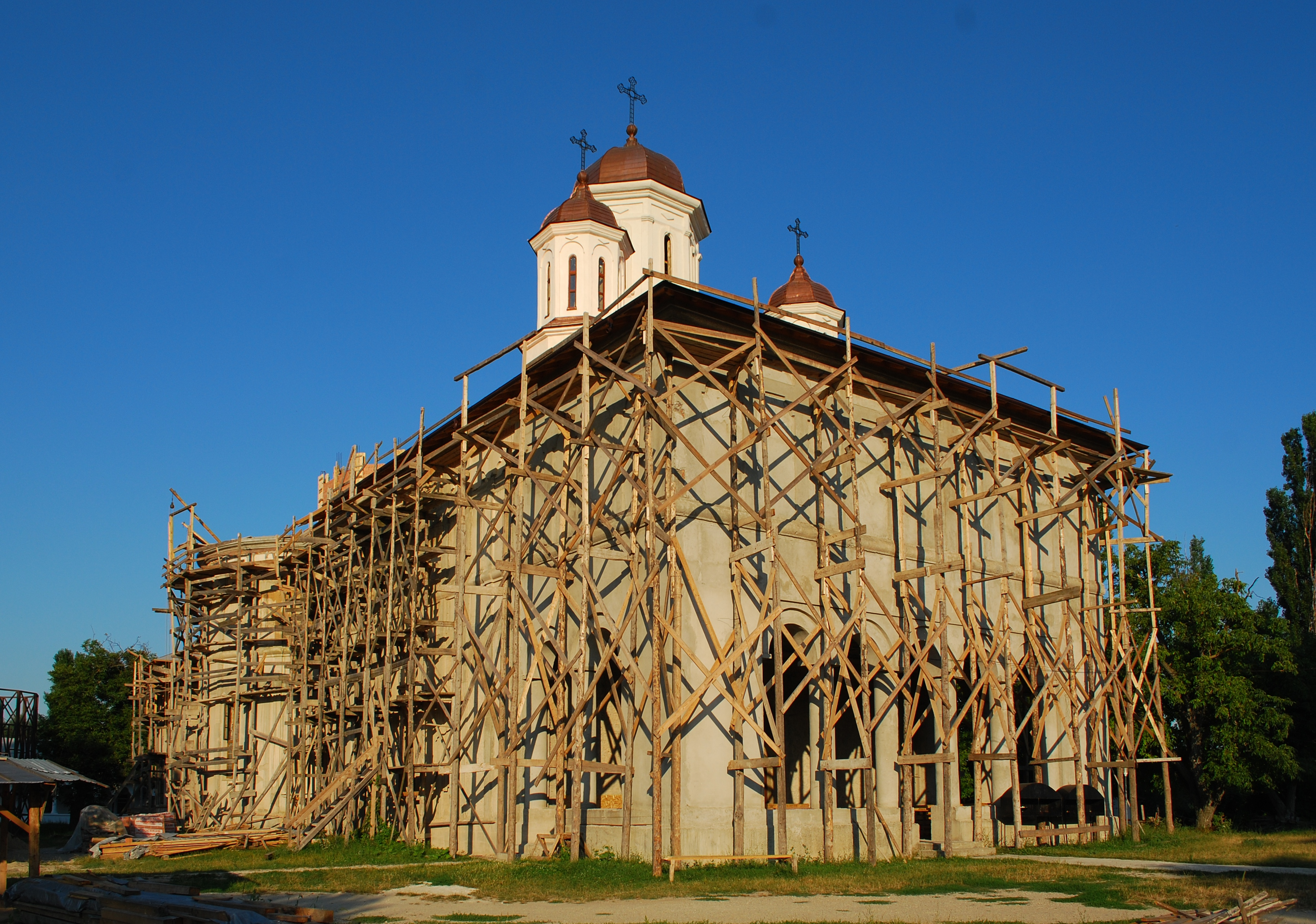

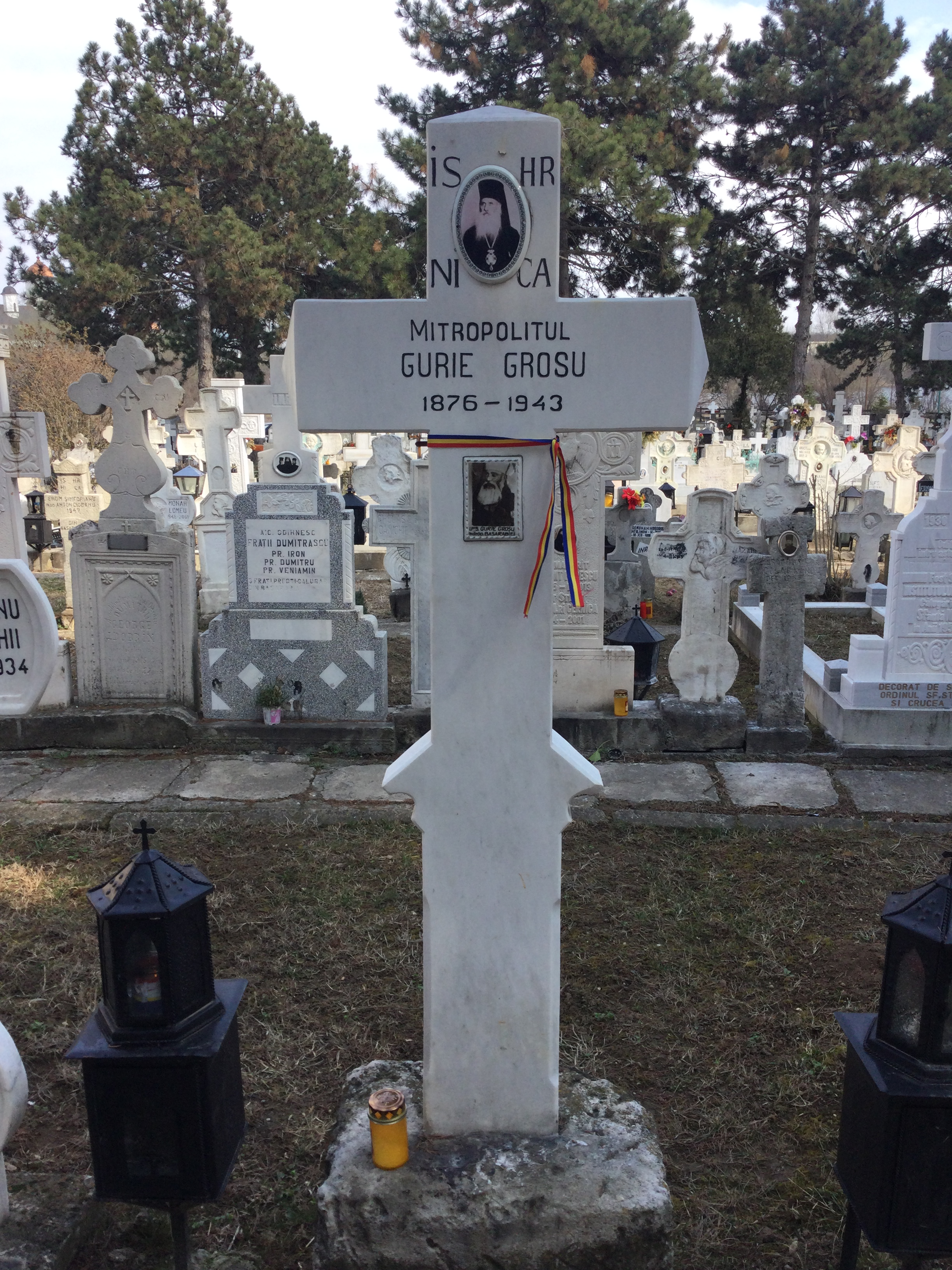
