= Oprișor =

- Commune
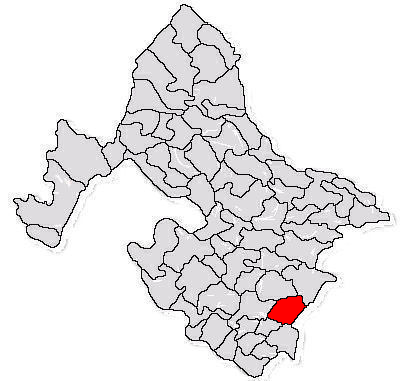
- Location in Mehedinți County

- Location in Romania
- Coordinates: 44°17′N 23°5′E
- Country: Romania
- County: Mehedinți

Government
  - Mayor (2020–2024): Constantin Gîrleanu (PSD)
- Area: 70.49 km^{2} (27.22 sq mi)
- Elevation: 196 m (643 ft)
- Population (2021-12-01): 1,681
  - Density: 24/km^{2} (62/sq mi)
- Time zone: EET/EEST (UTC+2/+3)
- Postal code: 227335
- Area code: +(40) 252
- Vehicle reg.: MH
- Website: www.cloprisor.ro

Oprișor is a commune in Mehedinți County, Oltenia, Romania. It is composed of two villages, Oprișor and Prisăceaua.

The commune lies in the western reaches of the Wallachian Plain. It is located in the southeastern part of Mehedinți County, 63 km (39 mi) from the county seat, Drobeta-Turnu Severin, on the border with Dolj County.

Historical population
Year	Pop.	±%
2002	3,122	—
2011	2,315	−25.8%
2021	1,681	−27.4%
Source: Census data

== Natives ==
- Geo Saizescu (1932–2013), actor and film director
