= Brigada Diverse în alertă! =

1971 Romanian action film

- Directed by: Mircea Drăgan
- Starring: Toma Caragiu; Dem Rădulescu
- Release date: 26 July 1971
- Running time: 95 minutes
- Country: Romania
- Language: Romanian

Brigada Diverse în alertă! is a 1971 Romanian action-comedy film directed by Mircea Drăgan.

== Cast ==
- Toma Caragiu - Cpt. Panait
- Dem Rădulescu - Gogu Steriade
- Sebastian Papaiani - NCO Capsuna
- Puiu Călinescu - Trandafir
- Iurie Darie - Major Dobrescu
- Jean Constantin - Patraulea
- Dumitru Furdui - Sgt. Major Cristoloveanu
- Ion Besoiu - Vornicescu
