= Stela Popescu =

Romanian actress

Stela Popescu Grand Cross and Sash ranks of the Order of the Star of Romania
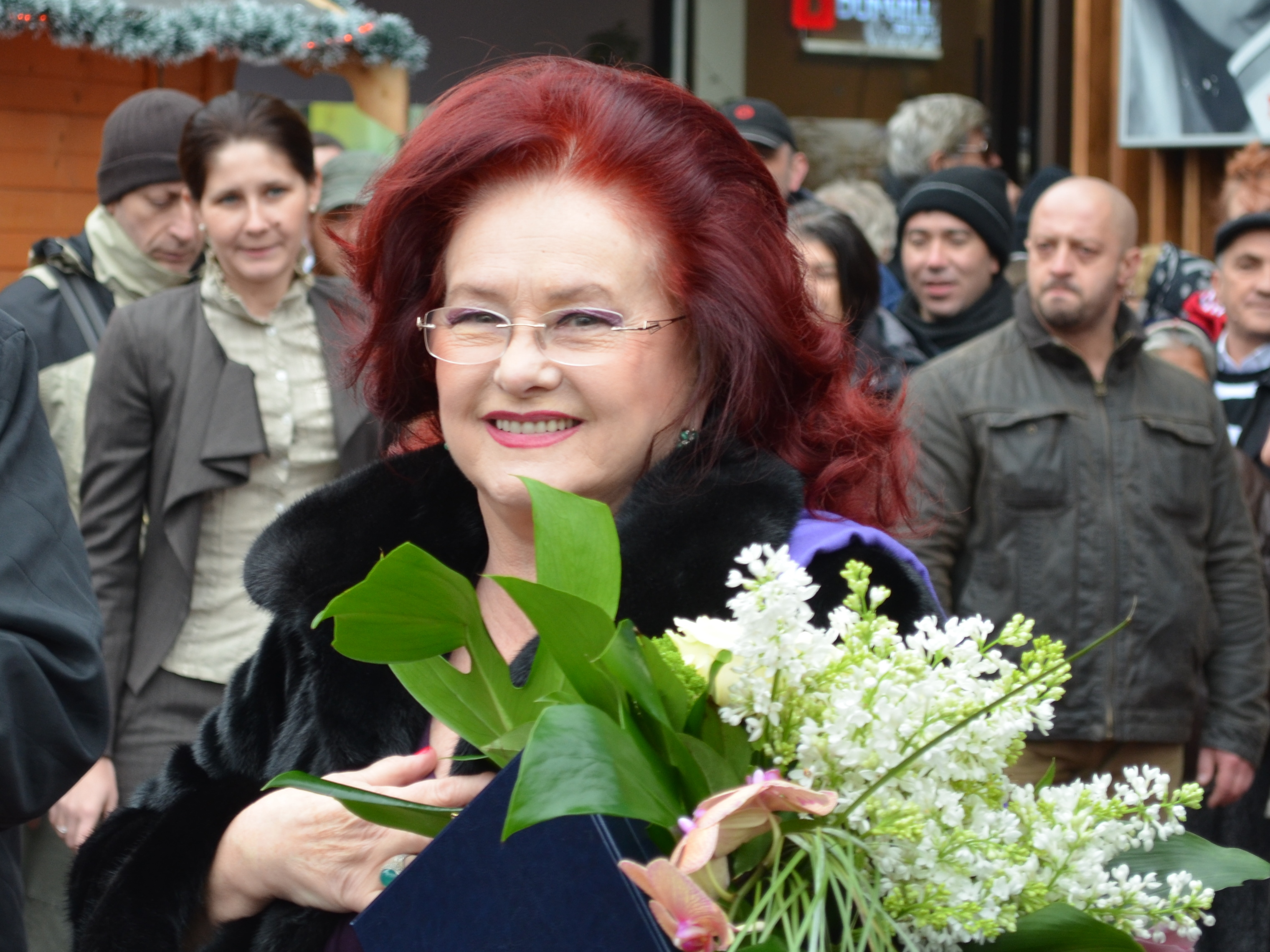
- Stela Popescu receives a star on the Walk of Fame Bucharest.
- Born: 21 December 1935; Slobozia-Hodorogea, Orhei, Kingdom of Romania (now in Moldova)
- Died: 23 November 2017 (aged 81); Bucharest, Romania
- Resting place: Cernica Monastery
- Occupations: Actress, humanitarian, celebrity, singer

Stela Popescu (21 December 1935 – 23 November 2017) was a Romanian actress and TV personality considered the greatest comedy actress and one of best female actresses of all time in Romania. With Ștefan Bănică and Alexandru Arșinel she was successively half of two famous romantic partnerships.

In 2006, 2011, and 2017 the artist was chosen by Disney Pixar to provide the Romanian voice of Flo in the animated trilogy Cars.

== Early life ==
Stela Popescu was born into a family of teachers in the village of Slobozia-Hodorogea, Orhei. Her first memory was the Soviet occupation of Basarabia. In 1940, her father was deported to Siberia and she didn't know what happened with him for 19 years. In 1944, when the Red Army reoccupied Basarabia, after it had been liberated by the Romanian Army in 1941, her mother fled with her daughter to Brașov in the still free Romania. In 1953, she passed the college entrance examination and was assigned to the "Maxim Gorki" Russian Language School. She abandoned the course after a year and a half when she joined the Theater of the Ministry of the Interior. In 1956, she was admitted to the Institute of Theater and Cinematography, while continuing to perform in theater.

== Career ==
At the end of her studies, Popescu was assigned to the Theater in Brașov, where she gave 400 performances a year. From 1963 to 1969 she appeared at the Constantin Tănase Theater.

In 1969, Popescu joined the Comedy Theater, but this did not prevent her from continuing to appear with the Romanian Radio Broadcasting Company from 1963 to 2017. She collaborated with the Romanian magazine journalist Mihai Maximilian, whom she married in 1969 shortly after her divorce from Dan Puican.

She played in the famous Boema show at the Boema Garden, performances that fit into the anti-power landscape for that time, with great audience success. For 24 years she played at the Comedy Theater in the summer. When the theater season ended, she played at the Boema Garden Magazine. At the Comedy Theater she played from 1969 until 1993 when she returned to the "Constantin Tănase" Theater. In "Constantin Tănase" Theater and the Comedy Theater, Popescu shines on songs such as "The man who saw death", "Mother Boema" and "Boema, my weakness". Popescu performed for 18 years in The Premiere, 12 years in Petitioner and 10 years in The Envelope. She worked with directors such as Sanda Manu, Ion Cojar, Lucian Giurchescu, and Valeriu Moisescu.

Between 1971 and 1979, she portrayed a couple, on stage and on TV, with Ștefan Bănică. With Arșinel, starting in 1979, she worked with scripts by Mihai Maximilian.

In 1958, she debuted in cinema in Alo? You got the wrong number. She starred in over 25 films, such as Nea Mărin Billionaire (1979), On the Left Bank of the Blue Danube (1983), and Everyday I Miss You (1988).

Popescu starred in television from its inception, in theater and entertainment programs, on scripts by Mihai Maximilian, Grigore Pop, Octav Sava, and Dan Mihăescu. TVR released DVDs Star through the Stars (2006) and Stela and Arșinel (2005), which bring together some of her television appearances.

Since the mid-1990s, Popescu was the moderator of TV shows for women on TVR, Realitatea and Național TV.

She played in the TV series Cuscrele (2005–2006) as well as in the soap opera The War of the Sexes (2007–2008), Queen (2008–2009) and Aniela (2009–2010) as Coana Chiva. In 2011 she returned with a special participation in Love and Honor.

== Death ==
Stela Popescu was found dead by her adopted-daughter Doina Maximilian on 23 November 2017 inside her home in Bucharest. The cause of her death was a stroke. Popescu's body was exhibited at the Constantin Tănase Theater on Friday and was buried on 26 November at the cemetery at Cernica Monastery.

== Works ==
=== Film ===
- 1958: Alo? Ați greșit numărul! as Studenta Veronica
- 1972: Astă seară dansăm în familie as Stela
- 1979: Nea Marin miliardar as Spioana
- 1983: Pe malul stîng al Dunării albastre as Zaraza Lopez
- 1987: Figuranții as ambitious Zaza Bengescu's friend and working duo secondant benigne yet wild Zaraza
- 2007: De la miel pan'la Eiffel (TV movie)
- 2012: Toată lumea din familia noastră as Mrs. Vizureanu
- 2013: Mamaia as Matilda

=== Television ===
- 1999: Ministerul comediei
- 2007: Războiul Sexelor - Tincuța
- 2008: Regina - Sofia Rădulescu
- 2009: Aniela - Coana Chiva
- 2010: Moștenirea - Mariana
- 2011: Iubire și onoare - Zahira Rahman
- 2013: Spitalul de demență - Felicia Bularga

== See also ==
- Cinema of Romania
