= Ștefan Bănică Sr. =

Romanian actor and singer

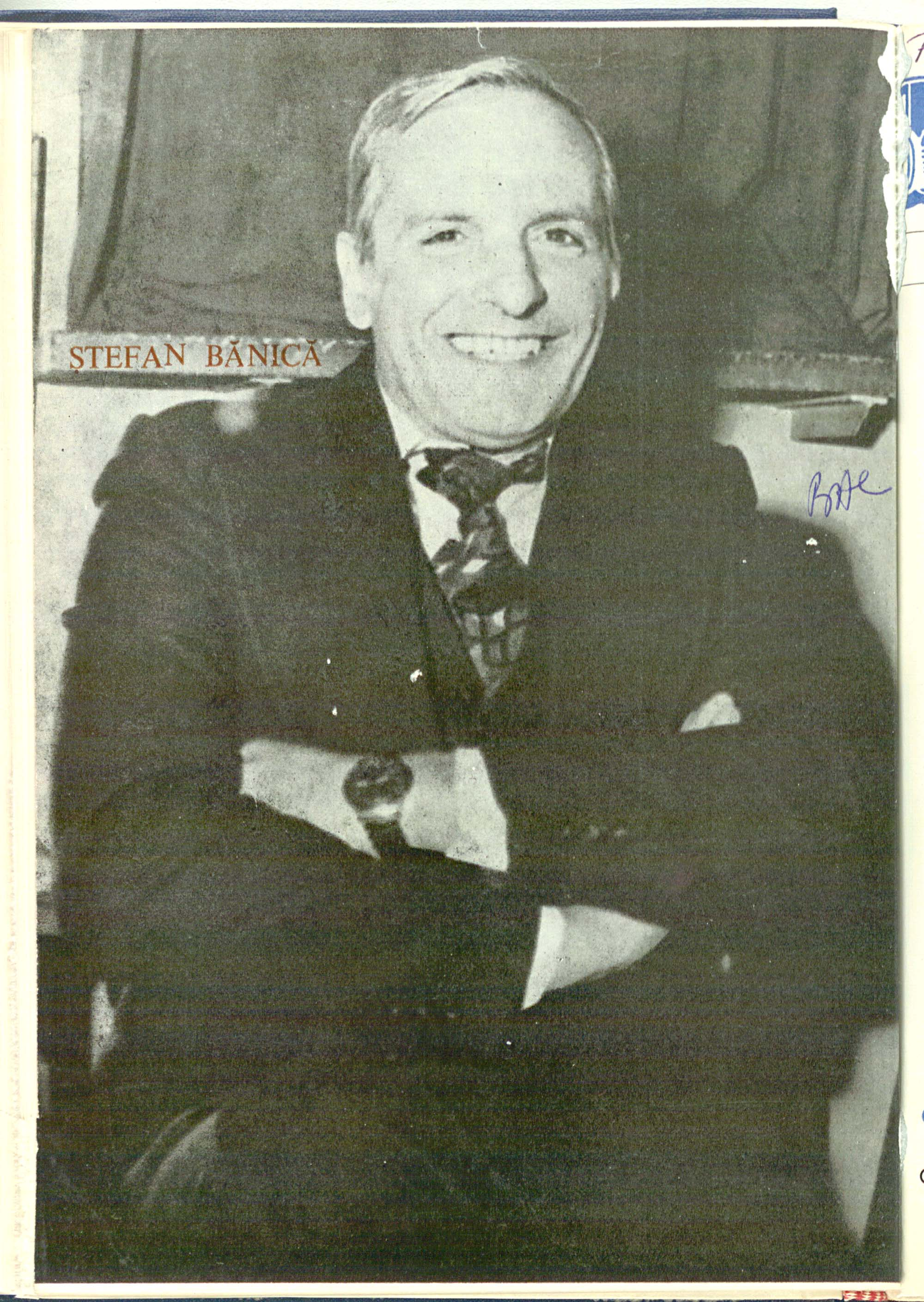
Ștefan Constantin Bănică

Ștefan Constantin Bănică (Romanian pronunciation: [ʃteˈfaŋ konstanˈtim bəˈnikə]) was a Romanian actor and singer. Aside from starring in multiple films, he was also known for his interpretation of songs such as "Îmi acordați un dans", "Cum am ajuns să te iubesc", "Gioconda se mărită", "Hei, coșar, coșar", and "Astă seară mă fac praf". His son, Ștefan Jr., is also well known in the entertainment industry.

== Biography ==
He was born in Călărași, on 11 November 1933, in a house situated on Călărași Street (nowadays Pompierilor Street); his father was Drăgan Constandache (1907-1961), a lăutar, and his mother was Leonora (1911-1986). He had a younger brother, Nicolae (born 1936), which died in 1988. Bănică attended the Cantemir High School in Bucharest. After his son was born in 1967, he re-married and also had another son, Alexandru Silviu (born 1975).

He died in Bucharest, on 26 May 1995, at the age of 61. On 13 January 2001, his younger son died at the age of 25, in a road accident. On World Theater Day 2016, Bănică posthumously received a star on the Walk of Fame in Bucharest, as a sign of recognition and appreciation for his entire activity in the field of theater and film.

== Filmography ==
- Dincolo de barieră (1965)
- Golgota (1966)
- Haiducii (1966)
- Tunelul (1967)
- Împușcături pe portativ (1967)
- Șeful sectorului suflete
- Zile de vară (1968)
- Vin cicliștii (1968)
- Brigada Diverse intră în acțiune (1970)
- Cîntecele mării (1970)
- Brigada Diverse în alertă! (1971)
- Vifornița (1973)
- Proprietarii (1973)
- Păcală (1974)
- Fair Play (1977)
- Septembrie (1978)
- Cianura... și picătura de ploaie (1978)
- Nea Mărin miliardar (1979)
- Singur printre prieteni (1979)
- De ce trag clopotele, Mitică? (1982)
- Harababura (1990)
- Cel mai iubit dintre pământeni (1993)
