= Alexandru Arșinel =

Romanian comedian and actor (1939–2022)

Alexandru Arșinel Order of The Culture of Merit Romania
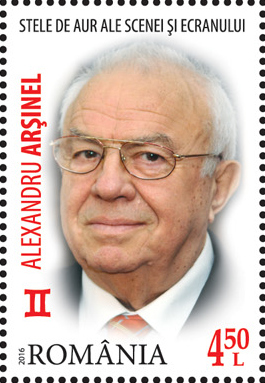
- Born: Alexandru Ioan Arșinel; 4 June 1939; Dolhasca, Kingdom of Romania
- Died: 29 September 2022 (aged 83); Bucharest, Romania
- Burial place: Bellu Cemetery
- Occupations: Actor, comedian, television star
- Years active: 1962–2022

Alexandru Ioan Arșinel (Romanian pronunciation: [alekˈsandru arʃiˈnel]; 4 June 1939 – 29 September 2022) was a Romanian comedian and actor. He was born in Dolhasca, Kingdom of Romania.

Arșinel was an ethnic Aromanian.

On screen, Arșinel was well-known for his partnership with Stela Popescu, with whom he starred in films such as Cine e Didina? (1972).

In 2006 and 2011 the actor was chosen by Disney Pixar to provide the Romanian voice of Sheriff in the animated movie Cars. He died on 29 September 2022.

== Filmography ==
- Ana și "hoțul" (1981);
- Ca-n filme (1983);
- Colierul de turcoaze (1985);
- În fiecare zi mi-e dor de tine (1987);
- Flăcăul cu o singură bretea (1990);
- Miss Litoral (1990);
- A doua cădere a Constantinopolului (1993);
- Paradisul în direct (1994);
- Cuscrele (2005–2006)
- Războiul sexelor (2007–2008)
- Regina (2008–2009)
- Moștenirea (2010–2011)
- Toată lumea din familia noastră (2012)
- O săptămână nebună (2014)
- Fetele lu domn profesor (2014)
- Un Crăciun altfel (2014).
