= Geo Saizescu =

Romanian actor

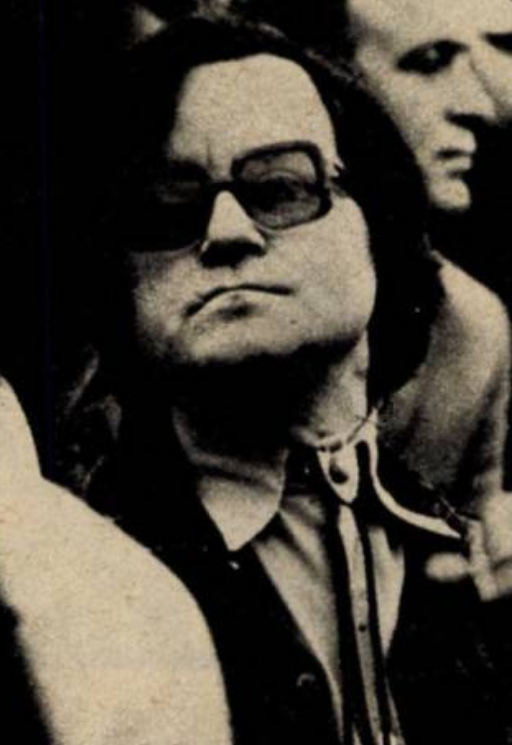
- Saizescu filming Grăbește-te încet in April 1981
- Born: Gheorghe Saizescu; 14 November 1932; Prisăceaua, Mehedinți County, Romania
- Died: 23 September 2013 (aged 80); Bucharest, Romania
- Resting place: Cernica Monastery, Pantelimon, Ilfov
- Education: Caragiale National University of Theatre and Film
- Occupations: Actor, film director
- Years active: 1956–2012
- Children: Cătălin Saizescu
- Awards: National Order of Faithful Service, Knight rank

Geo Saizescu (14 November 1932 – 23 September 2013) was a Romanian film director, screenwriter, and actor. He appeared in 22 films between 1963 and 2009 and directed 16 films between 1956 and 2012.

He was born in Prisăceaua, Mehedinți County in 1932, the twelfth child of his parents; his father was a notary in the village. After his secondary studies at the Traian High School in Turnu Severin, he studied at the I.L. Caragiale Institute of Theatre and Film Arts (IATC) in Bucharest, film directing department, graduating in 1957. He made his directorial debut in 1956 with the film Aventurile bravului soldat Svejk; in 1958 he wrote the script and directed the film Doi vecini.

In 2002 he was awarded the National Order of Faithful Service, Knight rank. He died at the age of 80 in Bucharest and was buried in the cemetery at Cernica Monastery, in nearby Pantelimon.

Saizescu was the founder of the Faculty of Arts at the Hyperion University in Bucharest; the faculty now bears his name. His son, Cătălin Saizescu (born in 1976) is an actor, film director, and producer.

== Selected filmography ==
- Doi vecini (1959)
- Un surîs în plină vară (1964)
- La porțile pămîntului (1966)
- Balul de sîmbătă seara (1968)
- Tonight We'll Dance at Home (1972)
- Păcală (1974)
- Eu, tu, și... Ovidiu (1978)
- Șantaj (1981)
- Grăbește-te încet (1982)
- The Secret of Bacchus (1984)
- Sosesc păsările călătoare (1985)
- Secretul lui Nemesis (1987)
- Harababura (1991)
- Păcală se întoarce (2006)
- Iubire elenă (2012)

== Acting ==
- A Bomb Was Stolen (1961)
- The Pale Light of Sorrow (1981)
