= Draga Olteanu Matei =

Romanian actress (1933–2020)

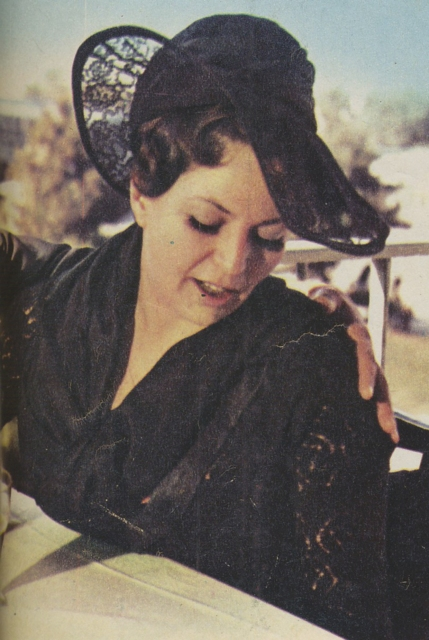
- Born: Emilia-Draga Olteanu-Matei; 24 October 1933; Bucharest, Kingdom of Romania
- Died: 18 November 2020 (aged 87); Iași, Romania
- Resting place: Eternitatea Cemetery, Piatra Neamț
- Education: I.L. Caragiale Institute of Theatre and Film Arts
- Occupation: Actress
- Years active: 1967–2006
- Spouse: Ion Matei (m. 1970; died 2014)
- Awards: Order of the Star of Romania, Knight rank Order of the Crown, Officer rank

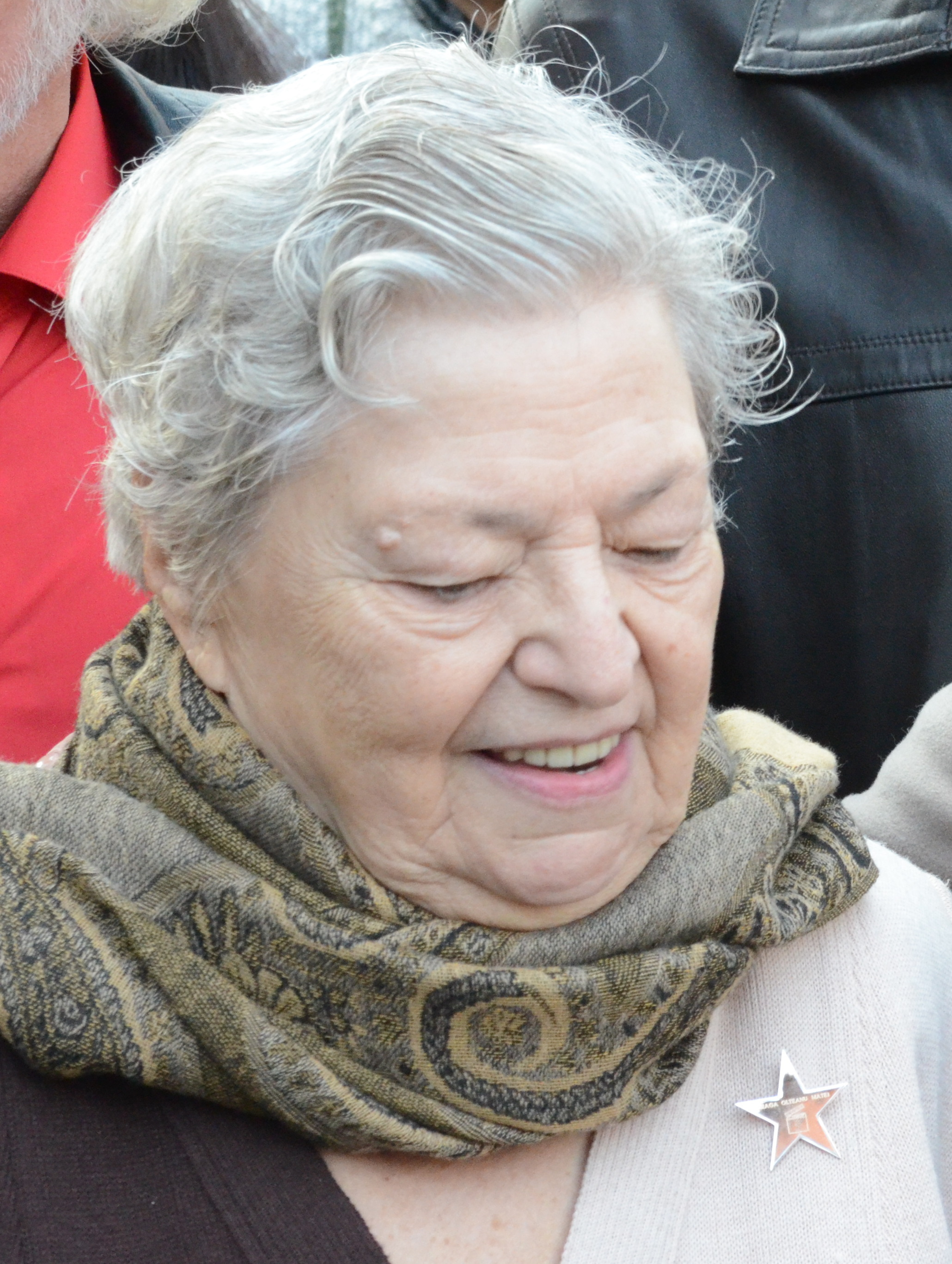
Draga Olteanu Matei receiving a star on the Romanian Walk of Fame in Bucharest

Draga Olteanu Matei (née Olteanu) (Romanian pronunciation: [ˈdraɡa olˈte̯anu maˈtej]; 24 October 1933 – 18 November 2020) was a Romanian actress. She performed in more than thirty films from 1967 to 2006.

Born in Bucharest, she studied at the Iulia Hasdeu High School in Lugoj. After moving to Brașov at age 17, she returned to Bucharest, where she graduated in 1956 from the I.L. Caragiale Institute of Theatre and Film Arts. In 1970 she married Ion Matei, a doctor from Piatra Neamț.

Draga Olteanu Matei was awarded the Order of the Star of Romania, Knight rank in May 2002 and the Order of the Crown of Romania, Officer rank in October 2014. She received a star on the Romanian Walk of Fame in Bucharest on 29 October 2011.

She died in 2020 of gastrointestinal bleeding at the Saint Spiridon Hospital in Iași and was buried with military honors at the Eternitatea Cemetery in Piatra Neamț.

== Selected filmography ==
Film
Year	Title	Role	Director
2015	Atlantis: Milo's Return	Mrs. Packard (Romanian dub)	
2014	O nouă viață	Nae's mother	Alex Fotea, Mihai Brătilă
2013	Îngeri pierduți	Aura's grandmother	Larry Maronese
2011	Moștenirea	Varvara	Iura Luncașu
2010	Narcisa sălbatică	Narcisa's grandmother	Mihai Bauman, Sebastian Voinea, Catrinel Dănăiață
2009	State de România	Orlando's grandmother	Iura Luncașu
2009	State de România - Student la Sorbona	The Gypsy Fortune-teller	Larry Maronese, Iura Luncaşu
2008	Regina	Ileana Toma	Iura Luncașu
2007	Inimă de țigan	Ileana Toma	Iura Luncașu
2006	Iubire ca în filme	Marghioala	Iura Luncașu
2005	Cuscrele	Aneta Păun	Nae Cosmescu
1999	The Famous Paparazzo		Nicolae Mărgineanu
1987	Coana Chirița la Iași	Coana Chirița	Mircea Drăgan
1986	Coana Chirița	Coana Chirița	Mircea Drăgan
1979	Uncle Marin, the Billionaire	Veta	Sergiu Nicolaescu
1978	Acțiunea „Autobuzul”	Vasilica	Virgil Calotescu
1977	Iarna Bobocilor	Varvara	Mircea Moldovan
1975	Toamna Bobocilor	Varvara	Mircea Moldovan
1975	Patima	Păuna Varlam	George Cornea
1973	Explosion	Angela, Salamandra's wife	Mircea Drăgan
1972	This evening we dance at home	Lăcrămioara	Geo Saizescu
1966	Haiducii	Zdrelea wife	Dinu Cocea
1962	A Bomb Was Stolen	The Nanny	Ion Popescu-Gopo
