= List of Romanian films of 1993 =

A list of Romanian films released in 1993.

== 1993 ==
Title	Director	Cast	Genre	Notes
Trei surori				
A trăda				
Cântarea cântărilor				
Ce bine era în Elada				
Cel mai iubit dintre pământeni	Șerban Marinescu	Ștefan Iordache, Maia Morgenstern, Tora Vasilescu		
Casa din vis	Ioan Carmazan	Maia Morgenstern, Horațiu Mălăele, Sofia Vicoveanca		
Crucea de piatră	Andrei Blaier	Gheorghe Dinică, Florina Cercel, Coca Bloos		
Doi haiduci și o crâșmăriță	George Cornea	Manuela Hărăbor, Olga Tudorache, Constantin Codrescu, Szabolcs Cseh și Ion Haiduc		
Gaițele				
La gura sobei				
Liceenii în alertă				
Macondo, lăcătușul zânelor				
Oglinda - Începutul adevărului	Sergiu Nicolaescu	Ion Siminie, Adrian Vîlcu	film istoric	
Patul conjugal				
Polul Sud				
Privește înainte cu mânie				
Pro patria				
Rosenemil	Radu Gabrea	Werner Stocker, Dana Vávrová, Dominique Sanda, Bernard-Pierre Donnadieu, Serge Reggiani		
Spitalul special				(Teatru TV)
Teatru Descompus				(Teatru)
Timpul liber				
Trei surori				(Teatru TV)
Ultima oră				(Teatru TV)
Ușa				
Vecini				
Vulpe - vânător				
