= List of horror films of 2013 =

A list of horror films released in 2013.

Horror films released in 2013
Title	Director	Cast	Country	Notes
All Hallows' Eve	Damien Leone	Katie Maguire, Catherine Callahan, Marie Maser, Kayla Lian, Mike Giannelli	United States	
Alpha Girls	Tony Trov, Johnny Zito	Ron Jeremy, Nikki Bell	United States	
The Amityville Asylum	Andrew Jones	Eileen Daly, Sophia Del Pizzo, Lee Bane	United Kingdom	
Arcana	Yoshitaka Yamaguchi	Tao Tsuchiya, Masataka Nakagauchi, Kaito	Japan	
Avenged	Michael S. Ojeda	Amanda Adrienne, Tom Ardavany, Ronnie Gene Blevins	United States	
Axeman	Jason Theney	Scot Pollard, Tiffany Shepis, Elissa Dowling	United States	
Babysitter Massacre	Henrique Couto	Erin R. Ryan, Haley Madison, Marylee Osbourne	United States	
Bad Milo!	Jacob Vaughan	Ken Marino, Peter Stormare, Gillian Jacobs	United States	Comedy horror
The Brides of Sodom	Creep Creepersin	Domiziano Arcangell, David Taylor, Rachel Zeskind	United States	Science fiction horror
Bunshinsaba 2	Ahn Byeong-ki	Xin Zhilei, Park Han-byul, Zhang Haoran	China	
Carrie	Kimberly Peirce	Chloë Grace Moretz, Julianne Moore, Gabriella Wilde	United States	
Christmas Cruelty!	Magne Steinsvoll, Per-Ingvar Tomren	Tormod Lien, Eline Aasheim, Magne Steinsvoll, Per-Ingvar Tomren	Norway	
The Chrysalis	Qiu Chuji	Sandrine Pinna, Ren Quan, Lee Wei	China	
Curse of Chucky	Don Mancini	Fiona Dourif, Danielle Bisutti, Brennan Elliott	United States	
The Complex	Hideo Nakata	Atsuko Maeda, Hiroki Narimiya, Masanobu Katsumura	Japan	
The Conjuring	James Wan	Vera Farmiga, Patrick Wilson, Ron Livingston, Lili Taylor	United States	
Dark Skies	Scott Stewart	Keri Russell, Josh Hamilton, Dakota Goyo	United States	
Dark Touch	Marina de Van	Marie Missy Keating, Marcella Plunkett, Padraic Delaney	France; Ireland	
The Deadly Strands	Zhao Xiaoxi, Zhao Xiao'ou	Leon Dai, Zak Di, Kong Qianqian	China	
The Demon's Rook	James Sizemore	Ashleigh Jo Sizemore, James Sizemore, John Chatham	United States	
The Den	Zachary Donohue	Melanie Papalia, Matt Riedy, David Schlachtenhaufen	United States	
Discopath	Renaud Gauthier		Canada	
Domnișoara Christina	Alexandru Maftei	Ioana Anastasia Anton, Maia Morgenstern	Romania	based on the novella by Mircea Eliade
Don't Go to the Reunion	Steve Goltz	Stephanie Leigh Rose, Spencer Harlan, Matty Dorschner, Hannah Herdt, Mike Goltz, Nick Sommer, Brady Simenson, Johnathon Krautkramer, Tawnie Thompson, Hayley San Fillippo, Marla Van Lanen, J.R. Watkins, Kaleb Shorey, Jerry Lesperance, Andy Taylor, Melissa Kasper, Tink, Brittny Wunrow	USA	
Evil Dead	Fede Álvarez	Jane Levy, Shiloh Fernandez, Lou Taylor Pucci	United States	
Fish & Cat	Shahram Mokri	Babak Karimi, Saeed Ebrahimifar, Siavash Cheraghipoor	Iran	
Frankenstein's Army	Richard Raaphorst	Karel Roden, Joshua Sasse, Robert Gwilym	Netherlands	
Fright Night 2: New Blood	Eduardo Rodriguez	Will Payne, Jaime Murray, Sean Power	United States	
The Green Inferno	Eli Roth	Lorenza Izzo, Ariel Levy, Daryl Sabara, Kirby Bliss Blanton	United States	
Hatchet III	B.J. McDonnell	Danielle Harris, Kane Hodder, Zach Galligan	United States	
Haunter	Vincenzo Natali	Abigail Breslin, Peter Outerbridge, Michelle Nolden	Canada	
The Haunting in Connecticut 2: Ghosts of Georgia	Tom Elkins	Chad Michael Murray, Abigail Spencer, Katee Sackhoff	United States	
Horror Stories 2	Jeong Beom-Sik, Kim Hwi, Kim Sung-ho, Min Kyu-dong		South Korea	
Insidious: Chapter 2	James Wan	Patrick Wilson, Rose Byrne, Lin Shaye	United States	
I Spit on Your Grave 2	Steven R. Monroe	Jemma Dallender, Joe Absolom, Yavor Baharoff	United States	
It's a Beautiful Day	Kayoko Asakura	Kim Kkot-bi, Nanako Ohata, Adam LaFramboise	Japan; United States	
Jug Face	Chad Crawford Kinkle	Sean Bridgers, Lauren Ashley Carter, Larry Fessenden	United States	
Killer Toon	Kim Yong-kyoon	Lee Si-young, Um Ki-joon, Hyeon-u	South Korea	
The Last Exorcism Part II	Ed Gass-Donnelly	Ashley Bell, Julia Garner, Spencer Treat Clark	United States	
Lift to Hell	Ning Jingwu	Blue Lan, Chrissie Chau, Tse Kwan-ho	China	
Long Weekend	Taweewat Wantha	Chinawut Indracusin, Sheranut Yusananda, Sean Jindachot	Thailand	
Mama	Andres Muschietti	Jessica Chastain, Nikolaj Coster-Waldau, Megan Charpentier	Spain; Canada	
Midnight Train	Zhang Jiangnan	Huo Siyan, Kara Hui, Calvin Li	China	
Miss Zombie	Sabu	Ayaka Komatsu, Makoto Togashi, Riku Onishi	Japan	
Mysterious Island 2	Rico Chung	Deng Jiajia, Julian Chen, Wei Yuhai	China	
Oculus	Mike Flanagan	Karen Gillan, Brenton Thwaites, Katee Sackhoff	United States	
Only Lovers Left Alive	Jim Jarmusch	Tom Hiddleston, Tilda Swinton, Mia Wasikowska	United Kingdom, Germany	
Pagpag: Siyam na Buhay	Frasco S. Moritz	Kathryn Bernardo, Daniel Padilla	Philippines	
Pee Mak	Banjong Pisanthanakun	Mario Maurer, Davika "Mai" Horne, Nattapong Chartpong	Thailand	Comedy horror
Phantom Of The Woods	Michael Storch		United States	
Pizza II: Villa	Deepan Chakravarthy	Ashok Selvan, Sanchita Shetty	India	
Possession	Brillante Ma. Mendoza	Meryll Soriano, Baron Geisler, Dennis Trillo	Philippines	A.k.a. Sapi
Pro Wrestlers vs Zombies	Cody Knotts	Roddy Piper, Matt Hardy, Kurt Angle	United States	
The Purge	James DeMonaco	Ethan Hawke, Lena Headey, Adelaide Kane	United States	
Rigor Mortis	Juno Mak	Chin Siu-ho, Kara Hui, Nina Paw	Hong Kong	
Sadako 3D 2	Tsutomu Hanabusa	Miori Takimoto, Kōji Seto, Itsumi Osawa	Japan	
The Supernatural Events on Campus	Guan Er	Zhao Yihuan, Wang Yi, Li Manyi	China	
Tales from the Dark 1	Simon Yam, Lee Chi-ngai, Fruit Chan	Simon Yam, Tony Leung Ka-fai, Susan Shaw	Hong Kong	
Tales from the Dark 2	Gordon Chan, Lawrence "Ah Mon" Lau, Teddy Robin	Fala Chen, Chan Fat-kuk, Teddy Robin	Hong Kong	
Texas Chainsaw 3D	John Luessenhop	Alexandra Daddario, Scott Eastwood, Tania Raymonde	United States	
This Is The End	Evan Goldberg, Seth Rogen	James Franco, Jonah Hill, Seth Rogen, Jay Baruchel, Danny McBride, Craig Robinson	United States	Comedy horror
V/H/S/2	Various	Various	United States	
We Are What We Are	Jim Mickle	Bill Sage, Ambyr Childers, Julia Garner	United States	
Willow Creek	Bobcat Goldthwait	Alexie Gilmore, Bryce Johnson	United States	
Witching and Bitching	Álex de la Iglesia	Mario Casas, Hugo Silva, Carmen Maura	Spain	
Wolf Creek 2	Greg McLean	John Jarratt, Ryan Corr, Philippe Klaus, Shannon Ashlyn	Australia	
World War Z	Marc Forster	Paul Fahrenkopf, Aaron Henkin, Nicolette le Faye	United States	
