= Miss Christina =

Miss Christina may refer to:

- Miss Christina (novella), a 1936 horror novella by Mircea Eliade
- Miss Christina (1992 film), a Romanian horror thriller film, based on the novella
- Miss Christina (2013 film), a Romanian horror film, based on the novella
