= Szőnyi =

Szőnyi or Szönyi is a Hungarian surname. Notable people with these surnames include:

== People named Szőnyi ==
- Erzsébet Szőnyi (1924–2019), Hungarian composer and music teacher
- Ferenc Szőnyi (born 1964), Hungarian ultra-triathlete and ultra-runner
- István Szőnyi (1894–1960), Hungarian painter and printmaker
- Olga Szőnyi (1933–2013), Hungarian opera singer (mezzo-soprano)
- Tamás Szőnyi (born 1957), Hungarian mathematician

== People named Szönyi ==
- Anca Szönyi Thomas (born 1958), Romanian visual artist and actress
- Julieta Szönyi (1949–2025), Romanian theatre and film actress

== See also ==
- Michael Szonyi (born 1967), a Canadian historian and sinologist of Hungarian descent
- Szőnyi úti Stadion, a sports stadium in Budapest, Hungary
- Szőny, a former town in Hungary, now part of the city of Komárom
