= Those Who Pay With Their Lives =

1989 film

- Directed by: Șerban Marinescu
- Written by: Șerban Marinescu
- Starring: Ștefan Iordache; Adrian Pintea; Marcel Iureș; Maia Morgenstern
- Release date: 1989
- Running time: 102 minutes
- Country: Romania
- Language: Romanian

Those Who Pay With Their Lives (Romanian: Cei care plătesc cu viața) is a 1989 Romanian drama film directed by Șerban Marinescu, and based on novels by Camil Petrescu. The film was selected as the Romanian entry for the Best Foreign Language Film at the 62nd Academy Awards, but was not accepted as a nominee.

== Cast ==
- Ștefan Iordache, as Șerban Saru-Sinești
- Adrian Pintea, as Gelu Ruscanu
- Gheorghe Visu
- Marcel Iureș
- Ovidiu Ghiniță, as Ștefan Ladima
- Maia Morgenstern
- Mariana Mihuț, as Nora
- Irina Petrescu
- Julieta Szönyi
- Șerban Cantacuzino
- Tudorel Filimon
- Valentin Uritescu
- Ileana Predescu
- Ștefan Velniciuc
- Bujor Macrin
- Dan Profiroiu

== See also ==
- List of submissions to the 62nd Academy Awards for Best Foreign Language Film
- List of Romanian submissions for the Academy Award for Best Foreign Language Film
