= Cel mai iubit dintre pământeni =

1980 novel by Marin Preda

The Earth's Most Beloved Son
- Author: Marin Preda
- Original title: Cel mai iubit dintre pământeni
- Language: Romanian
- Genre: Novel
- Publication date: 1980
- Publication place: Romania
- Media type: Print (Hardback & Paperback)
- ISBN: 973-95914-1-8

Cel mai iubit dintre pământeni (English: The Earth's Most Beloved Son) is the last novel by the Romanian author Marin Preda. Written in 1980, it is an intricate fresco of Communist Romania and the horrors of the Stalinist era.

A film adaptation of the novel, directed by Șerban Marinescu and starring Ștefan Iordache in the role of Petrini, was released in 1993.

== Plot summary ==
A long epic, written in first-person, Cel mai iubit... is the life-story confession of a prisoner waiting for his trial. Victor Petrini, a promising intellectual in the 1950s and a lecturer in Philosophy, seduces his best friend's wife, Matilda, who eventually becomes his wife. Nonetheless, and despite the birth of their daughter, the sexual attraction between them is exhausted shortly after their wedding. Victor is arrested by the repressive secret police (the Securitate), wrongly accused of being connected to a terrorist organisation, and sentenced to prison and forced labor – the verdict constitutes a brutal end to all his projects and ideals.

During his several-year-long confinement, at first in the Romanian version of the Gulag, then on a lead mine in the Northern Carpathian Mountains, he is divorced and forsaken by his wife, and hardens his character in order to survive. Eventually, he even manages to attack and kill one of the torturers engaged in his re-education (a crime which is successfully hidden from the authorities).

Once released, Petrini has to start back from zero. He gets a job as pest controller (killing rats) and accommodates to a new, proletarian and suburban existence. A few years later, he manages to obtain employment as a bookkeeper in a state-owned company, where he meets Suzy, with whom he falls in love. Shortly after, in self-defence, he kills Suzy's ex-husband by throwing him out from a cable railway, and has to return to jail.
