= Iacob (film) =

- Directed by: Mircea Daneliuc
- Starring: Dorel Vișan; Cecilia Bârbora
- Release date: 14 November 1988
- Running time: 117 minutes
- Country: Romania
- Language: Romanian

Iacob is a 1988 Romanian film directed by Mircea Daneliuc and starring Dorel Vișan. The latter was nominated for European Film Award for Best Actor.

== Synopsis ==
Iacob (Dorel Vișan) is a gold miner who is involved in a risky profession to support his family. He cares for his wife, mother-in-law, and four children in this socio-political drama.

== Cast ==
- Dorel Vișan as Iacob
- Cecilia Bârbora as Veturia
- Ion Fiscuteanu as Trifan
- Maria Seleș as Aspasia
- Livia Baba as Bătrâna
- Dinu Apetrei as Ilie Roșu
- Florin Zamfirescu
- Ion Besoiu
- Constantin Cotimanis
- Adrian Titieni as Inginerul
- Valentin Uritescu

== Awards ==
- European Film Award for Best Actor - Dorel Vișan (nominated)
