= Andronescu =

Andronescu is a Romanian surname. Notable people with the surname include:

- Coca Andronescu (1932–1998), Romanian stage and film actress
- Ecaterina Andronescu (born 1948), Romanian engineer, professor, and politician
