= Miss Christina (1992 film) =

- Domnișoara Christina
- Directed by: Viorel Sergovici
- Written by: Viorel Sergovici; Adriana Rogovschi; Florica Gheorghescu
- Based on: Miss Christina by Mircea Eliade
- Produced by: Adriana Rogovschi
- Starring: Adrian Pintea; Mariana Buruiană; Irina Petrescu
- Cinematography: Viorel Sergovici
- Edited by: Constantin Marciuc
- Music by: Adrian Enescu
- Production company: TVR
- Release date: 1992
- Country: Romania
- Language: Romanian

Miss Christina (Romanian: Domnișoara Christina) is a 1992, Romanian horror thriller film directed by Viorel Sergovici, starring Adrian Pintea, Mariana Buruiană, and Dragoș Pâslaru. It tells the story of the attraction between a young man and the ghost of a young woman. The film is based on the 1936 novella Miss Christina by Mircea Eliade.

== Cast ==
- Adrian Pintea as Paschievici
- Dragoș Pâslaru as Nazarie
- Irina Petrescu as Mrs. Moscu
- Mariana Buruiană as Cristina
- George Constantin as The Doctor
- Raluca Penu as Sanda
- Medeea Marinescu as Simina
- Julieta Strâmbeanu

== See also ==
- Miss Christina (2013 film), a later adaptation of the same novella.
