= Scăieni Phalanstery =

Utopic Fourierist community in 1830s Wallachia

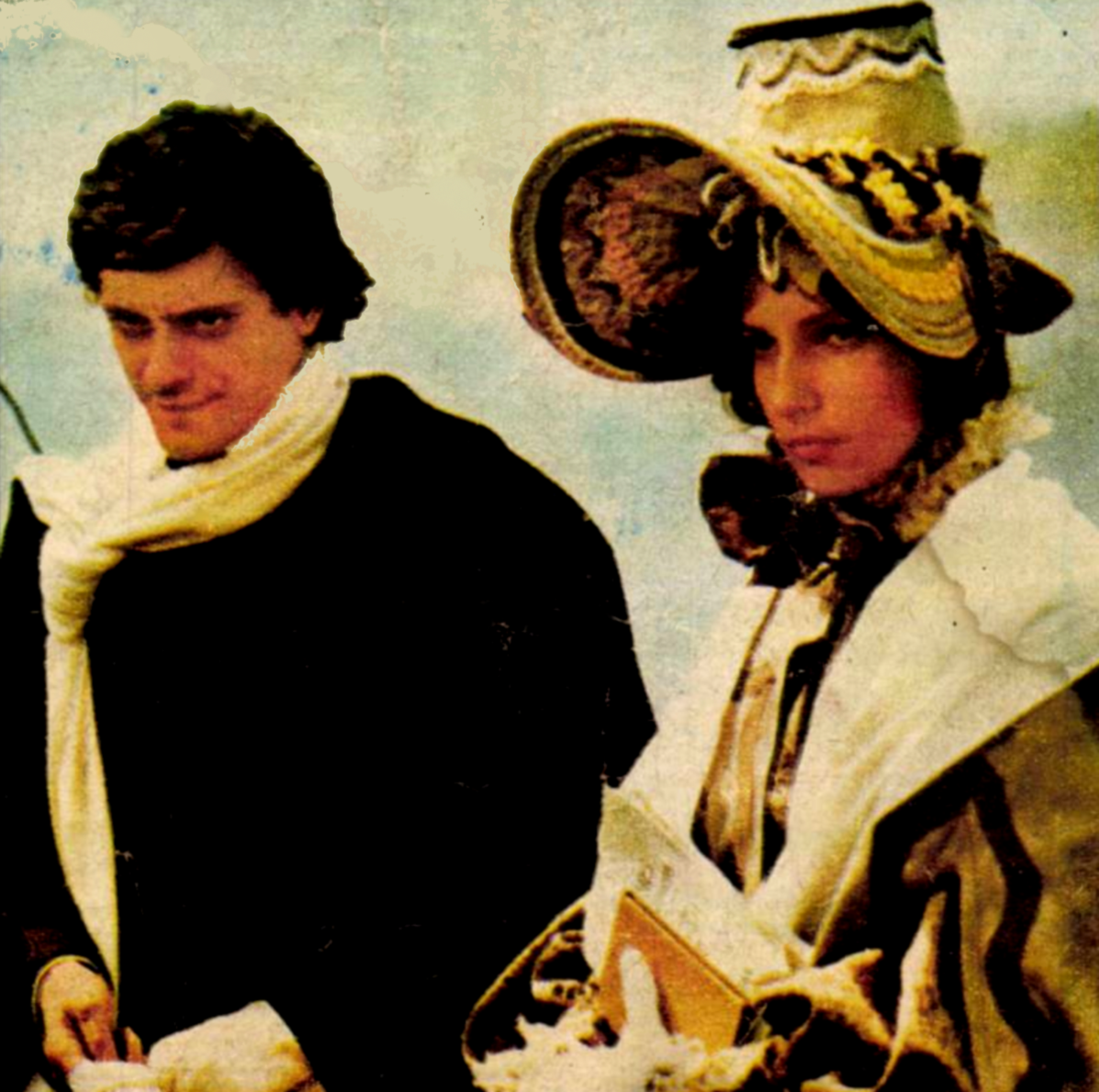
Photograph of a scene from the 1979 Romanian film Falansterul: Adrian Pintea as Teodor Diamant, and Julieta Szönyi as his (fictional) lover, Catița Fanache

Scăieni Phalanstery (Falansterul de la Scăieni) was a utopic experimental community (phalanstery) that operated 1835–36 under the guidance of Romanian boyar Teodor Diamant in the town of Scăieni, Prahova County, Wallachia (today part of Boldești-Scăeni Commune) based on the ideas of the French socialist Charles Fourier. The experiment was forcefully closed down by authorities.

== Origins ==
In the years before the 1848 Revolutions, Teodor Diamant, a member of the lower nobility, together with other Wallachian intellectuals learnt about the ideas of Charles Fourier, an early French utopian socialist, during Diamant's studies in Paris in the 1830s.

He presented his social and economic views in three articles that were published in June 1834 in Ion Heliade Rădulescu's Curierul Românesc magazine.

== Foundation ==
In 1835, a year after Diamant returned to Wallachia, he established a phalanstery (an agricultural-industrial community based on Fourier's principles) at the estate in Scăieni owned by boyar Emanoil Bălăceanu. The estate, ridden with debts, had already been put under sequester and the ongoing debt problem prevented the society from acquiring better equipment.

The first attestation of the society was on March 10, 1835, when Bălăceanu leased the estate to the society, the date being mentioned by Bălăceanu as the start of the phalanstery. The preparations took the rest of the year 1836 and the society began functioning in early 1836.

== The community ==
The earliest members of the phalanstery were Roma people liberated from slavery by the boyar, but the first recruits moved to Scăieni in January 1836. Another group of ten young people who joined the phalanstery on August 18, 1836.

It produced both agricultural and handicraft goods, the workday was of only 8 hours, at a time when many peasants worked up to 14–16 hours a day, however there were no days of rest. The produce of the commune was distributed according to the amount of work performed and the level of skill, assessed through vote by the members of the community and according to the quantity of capital contributed.

== Ending ==
The community came into the eyes of the authorities in August 1836, and an official or agent visited the phalanstery in Scăieni. The report submitted described a group of 24 people wearing odd clothing and being not very willing to talk about their community to an outsider. The fact that so many men and women lived in a common household made the authorities presume that it was a brothel. The authorities demanded a more thorough examination of the community, but Bălăceanu refused.

The Phalanstery was terminated in 1836 by the authorities who apparently feared that this kind of experiment would encourage communist beliefs in the country, although the official reason given was that the community was not registered properly with the authorities.

Although documents of the time state there was no violence at the disbanding of the phalanstery, some romanticized accounts talk about an exile of the founders (according to Ion Ghica) or clashes between the phalanstery members and the authorities (according to Ştefan Greceanu). Nevertheless, Emanoil Bălăceanu was arrested at the order of Hospodar Alexandru Ghica, but it seems that the reason was that he refused to change the name of the Agricultural and Manufactural Society, which sounded too similar to an Agricultural Society of the Hospodar. Another reason was the insolence of asking the Hospodar in a petition dated November 1, 1836 for a modern plough.

Following the disbanding of the phalanstery, 14 of the former members of the phalanstery filed a complaint at the judicial divan against Manolache Bălăceanu, accusing him of breach of contract and requesting back the money invested, complaining about the living conditions in the phalanstery.

After that, Teodor Diamant continued envisioning the creation of new phalansteries ("agricultural-industrial colonies") for the newly liberated slaves in Moldavia in 1841, for this purpose preparing a memorandum to the Administrative Consul of Moldavia, but this was not accepted.

== Legacy ==
Being the earliest socialist movement in Romania, during the rule of the Communist Party in Romania, the authorities promoted Diamant as a visionary. In 1958, his work, Scrieri economice (Economic Writings) was posthumously published at Editura Științifică and in 1979 a movie called Falansterul, inspired from the Scăieni Phalanstery, was released.
