= Maftei =

Maftei is a Romanian surname. Notable people with the surname include:

- Alexandru Maftei, Romanian film director
- Ernest Maftei (1920–2006), Romanian actor
- Valentin Maftei (born 1974), Romanian rugby union footballer
- Vasile Maftei (born 1981), Romanian footballer
