= Cuibul de viespi =

1986 Romanian film directed by Horea Popescu

- Directed by: Horea Popescu
- Starring: Cornelia Alexoi-Columbeanu; Viviana Alivizache
- Release date: 1986
- Running time: 1h 55min
- Country: Romania
- Language: Romanian

Cuibul de viespi is a 1986 Romanian comedy film directed by Horea Popescu.

== Cast ==
- Ovidiu Iuliu Moldovan - Mircea Aldea
- Coca Andronescu - Zoia
- Tamara Buciuceanu - Aneta Duduleanu
- Gheorghe Dinică - Georges
- Tora Vasilescu - Collette
- Alexandru Repan - Al. Popescu
- Maria Ploae - Margareta Aldea
- Mihnea Columbeanu - Cioclu 1
- Mircea Albulescu - Om necajit
- George Constantin - Oncle Michel
- Marin Moraru - Ianache Duduleanu
- Ion Cojar - Valeriu
- Theodor Danetti - Antreprenor pompe funebre
