= The Conjugal Bed =

The Conjugal Bed can refer to:

- The Conjugal Bed (1963 film), a 1963 Italian film
- The Conjugal Bed (1993 film), a 1993 Romanian film
