= The Bastards (film) =

Ticalosii
- Directed by: Șerban Marinescu
- Starring: Ștefan Iordache; Dorel Vișan
- Release date: 16 March 2007
- Running time: 87 minutes
- Country: Romania
- Language: Romanian

The Bastards (Romanian: Ticăloșii) is a 2007 Romanian drama film directed by Șerban Marinescu. It is about the upper echelons of Romanian politics.

== Synopsis ==
Didi Sfiosu, nicknamed "Hero of the Barricade", is a former revolutionary who serves as key advisor to the Romanian President. Dandu Patricianul is a wealthy businessman who has financed the ruling political Party at the last electoral campaign, but now is alleged to support the opposition.

Mister Pompi is Romanian Prime Minister, with the help of a clever advisor named Pejbeanu and a former "Securitate Agent" named Romanescu, controls and spies upon Patricianu's moves. He discovers a plot that involves Patricianu himself, an opposition senator and the ambitious and powerful General Dorobandu. Helped by an up-and-coming reporter, they want to prove that corruption has reached the cabinet, in order to turn the tide of public opinion and to propose the general as the next Chief of state.

Then Sfiosu, warned about this situation, arranges a meeting between Dandu and the Premier in order to reach an agreement; but this meeting fails. The Prime Minister decides to make a risky move; without notifying Sfiosu, he orders a complacent Magistrate to send an arrest warrant to Patricianu. Sfiosu gets angry about and speaks directly to the President of Republic, asking for the immediate release of Patricianu; Sfiosu knows that Dandu is the only one able to finance the next campaign. However, Dandu Patricianul is freed because of a lack of evidence but the Premier and his faithful advisor understand that Sfiosu is more influential and informed than predicted.

Pompi, always advised by Pejbeanu, does a desperate move to avoid a thunderous defeat: he tries to "buy" both the senator and the reporter, eventually offering to the general anything in exchange of his withdrawal from the electoral run; General Dorobandu not only rejects the deal, he subtly threatens Pompi with a merciless revenge as soon as he's elected. Then Pompi decides a kind of "Final Solution": the assassination of the General during a hunting session. Didi Sfiosu is disgusted by those happenings, so he symbolically buries the revolution under a pile of garbage by planting a cross with his name on it and putting on the cross the only two items reminding him of the revolution; a foulard and a bandana. The meaning is clear: this democracy is bad, at least, at the same way of the dictatorship.

== Cast ==
- Ștefan Iordache - Didi Sfiosu
- Dorel Vișan - Dandu Patricianul
- Horațiu Mălăele - Pompi
- Răzvan Vasilescu - General Dorobanțu
- Gheorghe Dinică - Romanescu
- Monica Davidescu - Dandu's mistress
- Mircea Albulescu - restaurant owner
- Mitică Popescu - Marian
- Tomi Cristin - opposition senator
- Marius Florea Vizante - Ionel Iancu
- Ion Siminie - Ionel (President of Romania)
- Dan Diaconescu - himself

== Reception ==
The point of departure of the film, the novel Ciocoii noi cu bodyguard, was described by the Romanian critic Andrei Gorzo as a "meek, irrepressible prose, in which metaphors keep coming together against nature and proliferate like metastases", its characters standing out for their malicious and clever tongue. Likewise film has been labeled "stupid and irresponsible" because it takes on the clichés frequently conveyed by newspapers and TV that the entire political class is corrupt, with the final scene being described as "a cabotin declaration of despair". The characters are crudely sketched, with the director hoping to fill in the gaps by casting well-known actors in the lead roles, still according to Gorzo.

The Romanian literary critic Angelo Mitchievici wrote in an article published in România literară that "the film is a bit bad" because of its weak script, the stilted speech that "lets the whole mechanism of the story show" and the sentences full of clichés. According to him, "the grotesqueness should not have been thickened, otherwise it risks turning the film into a self-parody. The attempt to paint a fresco of Romanian political cul-de-sacs remains unfinished; in a rare moments and sketches the director has nonetheless captured the essence of democracy."
