= Semne în pustiu =

- Directed by: Nicolas Masson
- Starring: Mircea Albulescu; Nicolas Masson
- Release date: 1996
- Running time: 30 minutes
- Country: Romania
- Language: Romanian

Semne în pustiu (Signs in the Desert) is a 1996 short film directed by Nicolas Masson.

== Plot ==
The movie is the one-day story of a famous writer, touched with paralysis, whose faith cannot help him overcome his frustrations, and mostly the jealousy aroused by a woman too young and beautiful to be his wife.

== Cast ==
(in alphabetical order)

- Mircea Albulescu
- Dan Condurache
- Rona Hartner
- Nicolas Masson
- Cesonia Postelnicu
- Marian Ralea
- Boby Torok
- Dodo Voitis
