= Alexandru Repan =

Romanian actor

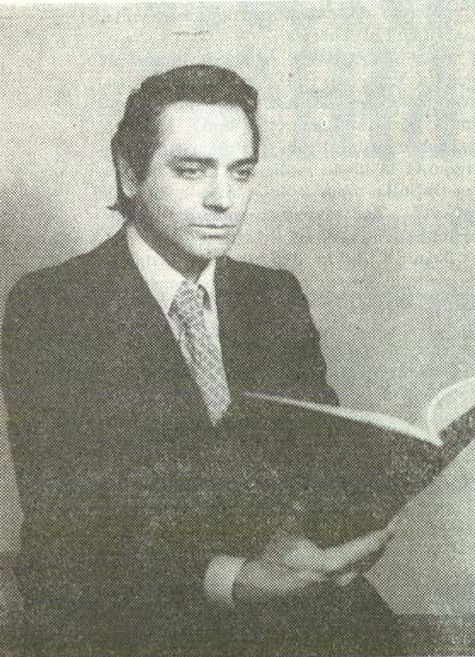
- Repan in 1985
- Born: 26 February 1940 (age 85); Bucharest, Kingdom of Romania
- Occupation: Actor
- Years active: 1963–present
- Awards: National Order of Faithful Service, Knight rank

Alexandru Repan (Romanian pronunciation: [alekˈsandru reˈpan]; born 26 February 1940) is a Romanian actor. He appeared in more than forty films since 1963. In 2002, he was awarded the National Order of Faithful Service, Knight rank.

== Selected filmography ==
Year	Title	Role	Notes
1971	Michael the Brave		
1979	Vlad Țepeș		
1980	Burebista		
1985	The Silver Mask		
1986	Cuibul de viespi		
1993	Trahir		
1999	The Famous Paparazzo		
2006	Vocea Inimii		
2012	Spitalul de demență		
2022	Strada Speranței		
