= The Snails' Senator =

- Directed by: Mircea Daneliuc
- Written by: Mircea Daneliuc
- Starring: Dorel Vișan
- Cinematography: Doru Mitran; Petre Petrescu
- Edited by: Melania Oproiu
- Release date: May 1995
- Running time: 100 minutes
- Country: Romania
- Language: Romanian

The Snails' Senator (Romanian: Senatorul melcilor) is a 1995 Romanian comedy film directed by Mircea Daneliuc. It was entered into the 1995 Cannes Film Festival.

== Cast ==
- Dorel Vișan – Senator Vârtosu
- Cecilia Bârbora – Cireșica Tudorache
- Clara Vodă – Mireille
- Madeleine Thibeault – Nadine
- Dan Chișu – Michel
- Florin Zamfirescu – townhall secretary
- Constanța Comănoiu – Cireșica's mother
- Nicolae Albani – the prefect
- Mircea Andreescu
- Dinu Apetrei – Viorel
- Anda Caropol – the senator's wife
- Viorel Comănici – Petrescu
- Camelia Zorlescu
- Flavius Constantinescu
- Viorica Geantă Chelbea (as Viorica Geantă)
- Haralambie Boroș – the mayor
