= Anda Caropol =

Romanian actress (1939–2023)

Anda Caropol (9 April 1939 – 13 December 2023) was a Romanian actress. Carapol graduated from the Institute of Theatre and Film Arts in 1960. She died on 13 December 2023, at the age of 84.

== Filmography ==
- 1960 – Băieții noștri
- 1961 – Drum Nou
- 1963 – Cerul n-are gratii
- 1963 – La vîrsta dragostei
- 1980 – Drumul oaselor
- 1981 – Am o idee
- 1985 – Vară sentimentală
- 1987 – Nemesis's secret
- 1993 – È pericoloso sporgersi
- 1995 – The Snails' Senator
- 2005 – Despre morți numai de bine
- 2006 – Margo
- 2010 – Program cu publicul
- 2016 – Atletico Textila (1 episode)
- 2016 – 35 Minutes After
- 2017 – Breaking News
- 2020 – Dacă ne deșteptăm
