= George Constantin =

Romanian actor (1933–1994)

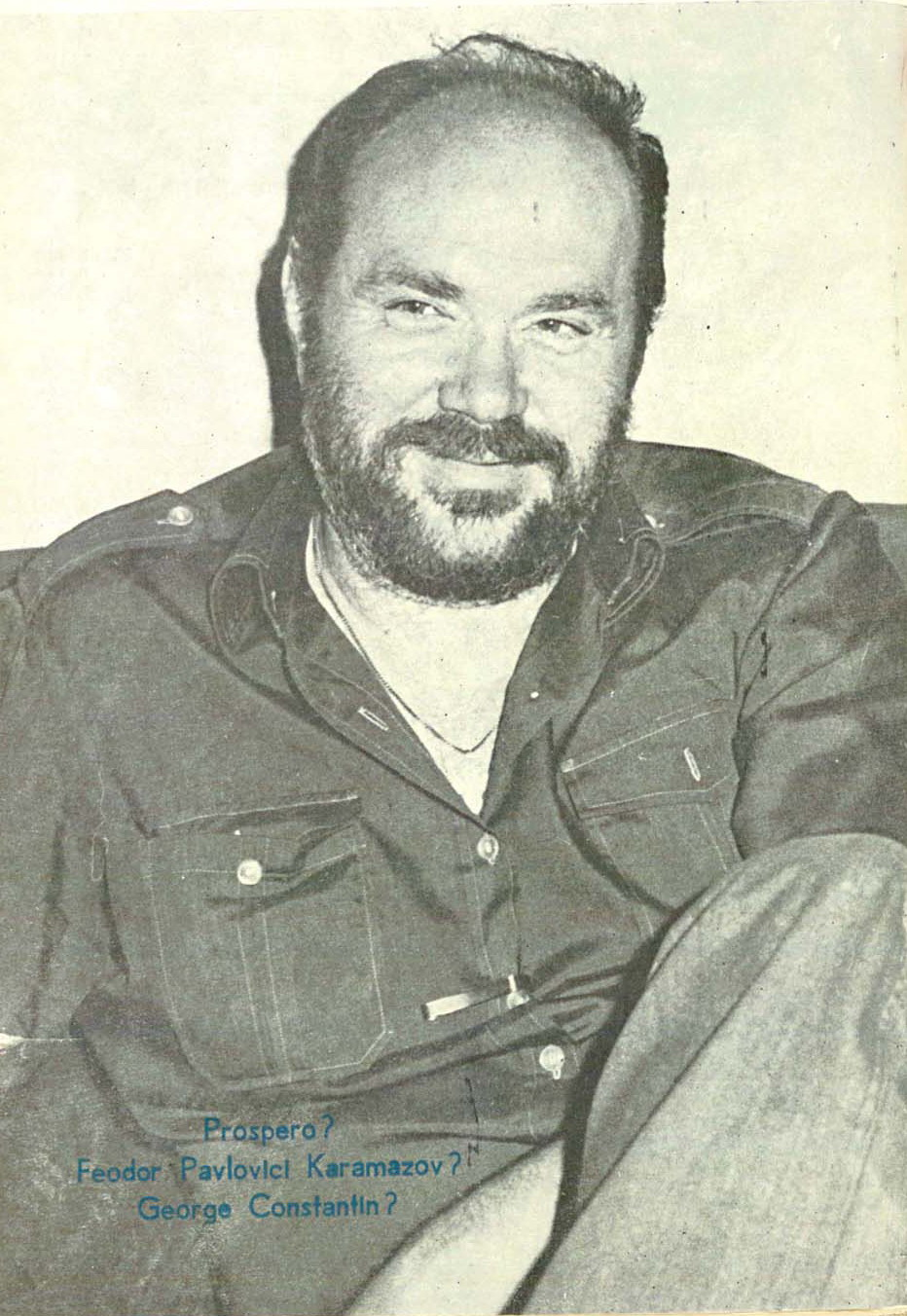
- Born: 3 May 1933; Bucharest, Kingdom of Romania
- Died: 26 April 1994 (aged 60); Bucharest, Romania
- Burial place: Bellu Cemetery, Bucharest
- Education: Caragiale National University of Theatre and Film
- Occupation: Actor
- Years active: 1960–1994
- Spouse: Iulia Buciuceanu
- Children: Mihai Constantin

George Constantin (Romanian pronunciation: [ˈdʒe̯ordʒe konstanˈtin]; 3 May 1933 – 26 April 1994) was a Romanian actor. He appeared in more than fifty films from 1960 to 1994.

Born in Bucharest, he graduated in 1956 from the I.L. Caragiale Institute of Theatre and Film Arts (IATC), after which he started playing at the Nottara Theater. In the early 1960s he married the mezzo-soprano Iulia Buciuceanu (the sister of actress Tamara Buciuceanu); their son Mihai Constantin, born in 1964, is also an actor.

In 1971, he was awarded the Order of Cultural Merit, 2nd class.

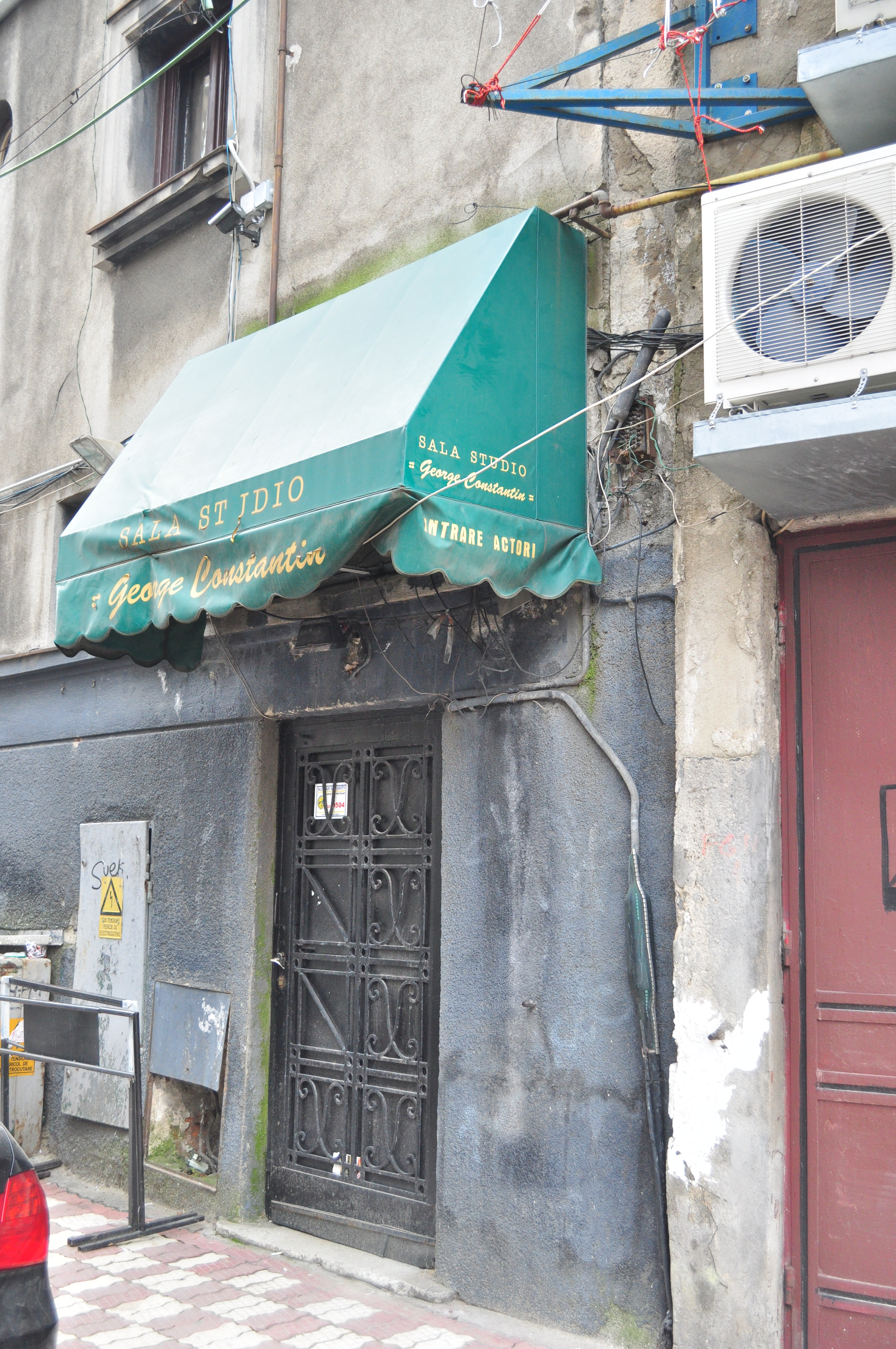
Entrance to the George Constantin Auditorium at the Nottara Theater in Bucharest

== Selected filmography ==
Year	Title	Role	Notes
1961	Aproape de soare	Șoni, steel worker	
1964	Un surîs în plină vară	Grigore, collective farm director	
1966	La porțile pămîntului	George Filimon, geologist	
1967	Diminețile unui băiat cuminte	Vive's father	
1968	The Reenactment	The prosecutor	
1971	Urmărirea	The Colonel	TV serial
1972	Cu mâinile curate	Constantin Semaca	
1973	Un august in flăcări		TV serial
1973	Ultimul cartuș	Constantin Semaca	
1974	Dincolo de nisipuri	Nae Caramet	
1976	Trei zile și trei nopți	Ion Lumei	
1978	Pentru patrie	Mihail Kogălniceanu	
1979	Vlad Țepeș	Metropolitan of Wallachia	
1980	Burebista	Burebista	
1981	Iancu Jianu haiducul	Andronache	
1981	Ștefan Luchian	Alexandru Bogdan-Pitești	
1982	Înghițitorul de săbii	Colonel Măruță	
1983	Pe malul stîng al Dunării albastre	Costi Bengescu	
1986	Cuibul de viespi	Uncle Michel	
1987	Punct... și de la capăt	George	
1992	Miss Christina	Doctor	TV film
1993	Oglinda	Andrey Vyshinsky	
1994	An Unforgettable Summer	General Cilibia	
