= Glissando (film) =

1982 film

- Directed by: Mircea Daneliuc
- Written by: Cezar Petrescu; Mircea Daneliuc
- Starring: Stefan Iordache
- Cinematography: Calin Ghibu
- Release date: 18 October 1982
- Running time: 165 minutes
- Country: Romania
- Language: Romanian

Glissando is a 1982 Romanian drama film directed by Mircea Daneliuc. The film was selected as the Romanian entry for the Best Foreign Language Film at the 57th Academy Awards, but was not accepted as a nominee.

== Cast ==
- Stefan Iordache
- Tora Vasilescu
- Petre Simionescu
- Victor Ionescu
- Ion Fiscuteanu
- Constantin Dinulescu
- Camelia Zorlescu
- Mihaela Nestorescu
- Rodica Moianu

== See also ==
- List of submissions to the 57th Academy Awards for Best Foreign Language Film
- List of Romanian submissions for the Academy Award for Best Foreign Language Film
