= Felix and Otilia =

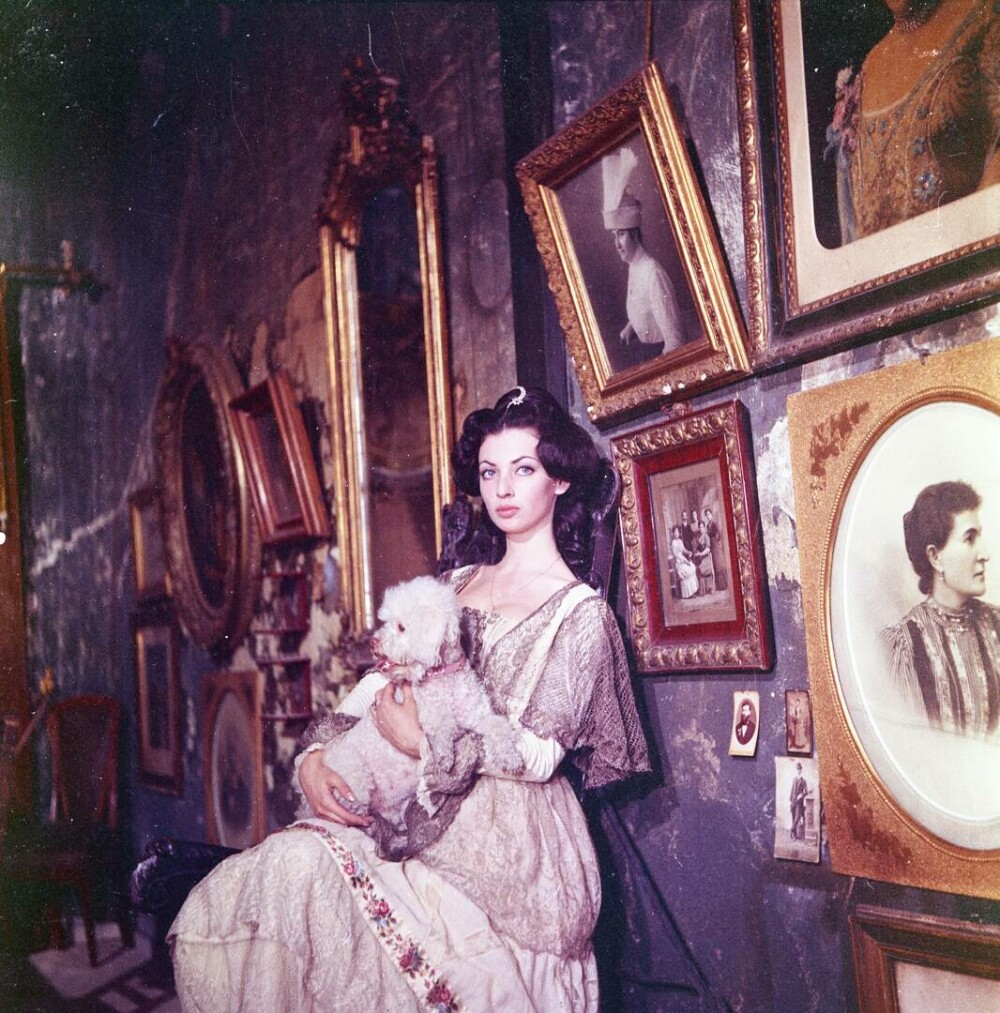
- Julieta Szönyi
- Directed by: Iulian Mihu
- Written by: George Călinescu (novel); Ioan Grigorescu
- Produced by: Marin Gheoroaie
- Starring: Radu Boruzescu; Julieta Szönyi; Sergiu Nicolaescu; Gheorghe Dinică; Gina Patrichi; Ovidiu Schumacher; Ion Dichiseanu
- Edited by: Lucia Anton
- Music by: Anatol Vieru
- Distributed by: Româniafilm
- Release date: March 20, 1972
- Running time: 146 minutes
- Country: Romania
- Language: Romanian

Felix and Otilia (Romanian: Felix și Otilia) is a 1972 Romanian drama film based on George Călinescu's 1938 novel Enigma Otiliei. The film was directed by Iulian Mihu and scripted by Ioan Grigorescu. The titular roles are played by Radu Boruzescu and Julieta Szönyi.

== Production ==
Screenwriter Ioan Grigorescu and director Iulian Mihu held "long and resultful discussions" with George Călinescu about an adaptation of his novel, Enigma Otiliei. The writer said that he wanted the film to be made in the style of The Umbrellas of Cherbourg, a musical film. He allegedly hummed a song that the screenwriter allegedly reproduced to composer Anatol Vieru. But in fact, what Vieru uses in this song is a mode he had widely used in his earlier works from the 1960s (Cello concerto n°1, Chamber Symphony, The Struggle against Inertia). The song was played by Aurelian Andreescu and was used before the credit titles in the beginning of the film.
