= Vlad Rădescu =

Romanian actor, theatre director and scholar

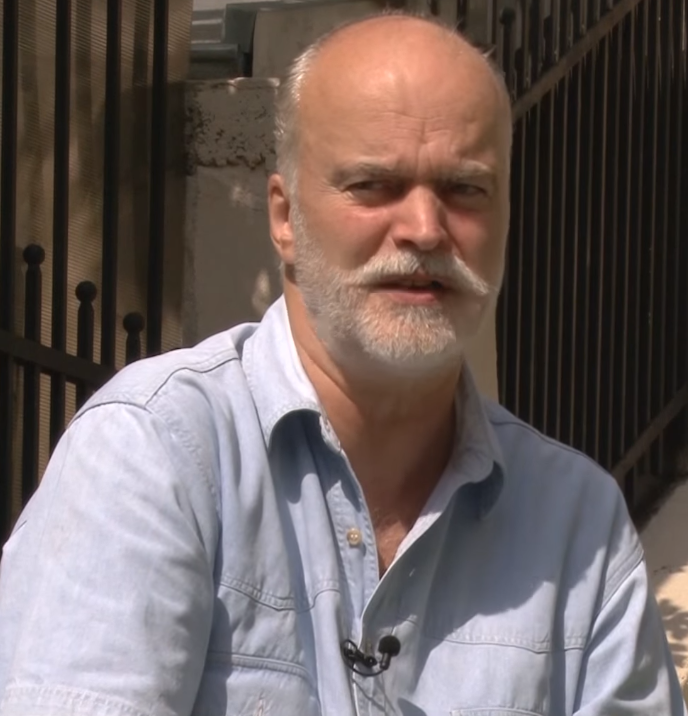
- Rădescu in 2014
- Born: 18 November 1952 (age 73); Bucharest, Romanian People's Republic
- Education: Institute of Theatre and Film Arts
- Occupations: Actor, director, producer, scholar
- Years active: 1971–present
- Spouse: Mihaela-Daniela Rădescu (m. 1986)
- Children: Mihaela Rădescu

Vlad Rădescu (Romanian pronunciation: [ˈvlad rəˈdesku]; born 18 November 1952 in Bucharest) is a Romanian actor, theatre director and scholar.

== Biography ==
Radescu was born on November 18, 1952, in Bucharest, the nephew of General Nicolae Rădescu. He attended Dimitrie Cantemir High School and the twelfth grade at Ion Luca Caragiale High School, both in Bucharest, where he graduated in 1971. He wanted to become a sailor, physician, journalist and archaeologist, but in the end chose theatre and graduated from the Institute of Theatre and Film Arts (IATC), Theatre Department, in 1975, having studied under Sanda Manu and Geta Angheluță.

He was assigned to Târgu Mureș in 1975 where he remained until 1994. During this period his theater and film career continued to prosper. He had the chance to travel a few times in Europe.

== Acting career ==
He was spotted by director Gheorghe Vitanidis while still in his freshman year. Vitanidis gave him the leading role of the title character in the biographical film Ciprian Porumbescu, which was a great success. In 1980 he played Comosicus in the historical epic Burebista. A few years later he played Avram Iancu, the main character in the films Munții în flăcări (Mountains on Fire) and La răscrucea marilor furtuni (The Crossings of Stormy Seas) (1980), this time directed by Mircea Moldovan. In foreign television productions, he has played the roles of Charlemagne in 1996, and Otto von Bismarck in 2007, 2008 and 2009. He has performed in many domestic and foreign film productions. Also present important roles in popular TV series and telenovelas.

He founded the international theater festival "Întâlnirile Școlilor și Academiilor europene de teatru", which ran for four years, the first two in Targu Mures (1993, 1994) and the last two in Targoviste (1995, 1996). He was also the initiator - in 1998 - of the hit show "Suits" directed by Dan Puric, which highlighted over 100 theatrical costumes created by Irina Solomon and Dragos Buhagiar, winning more than 10 awards in various theaters in the capital and country.

In early 2009, at the request of the leadership of the Ministry of Culture, he returned to the National Theatre in Târgu Mureș occupying the position of interim CEO until October 2010, when he was dismissed by Hunor Kelemen (Minister in office, then, President UDMR). He was restored to his post in March 2011, after a judicial decision which concluded that Kelemen had acted improperly.

Rădescu has organized alumni performances featuring several of his former students, including Octavian Strunilă, Diana Croitoru, Ștefania Dumitru, Florina Anghel, Adriana Bordeanu, Michael Bobonete, Michael Rait, Andreea Grama, Cornel Bulai) awards at film festivals: HOP Gala Festival Hyperion Improvisation Championship.

== Administrative career ==
From 1990 to 1994 he served as deputy executive director of the National Theatre in Târgu Mureș. In 1994, he returned to Bucharest and to work at the Little Theatre in Bucharest. CEO gets contest Nottara Theatre (1996 - 2000) in Bucharest. Between 1987 and 1994, he was associate professor at the University of Theatre in Târgu Mureș. From 1996 to 2002, he taught acting and cultural management at the Ecological University of Bucharest.

From 2002 he has been director of the European Foundation Cultural Centre. His is also Associate Professor PhD., and Head of Department at the Faculty of Theatre of the Spiru Haret University of Bucharest.

== Filmography ==
- Ciprian Porumbescu (1973) - Ciprian Porumbescu
- Burebista (1980)
- Catfish Island (1994)
- The enemy of my enemy (1999)
- Eva (2010) - Doctor
- Brancusi (2011)
- Marco D'Aviano (2011)
- Wild Daffodil (Serial TV) (2011)
- The Glass House (2010)
- Students ... in 53 hours or so (2010)
- Barbarossa (2009)
- Gloves Red (2009)
- Oli's Wedding (2009)
- Ashes and Blood (2008)
- Cherubs (Serial TV) (2008)
- Gruber's Journey (2008)
- Die Deutschen (2008) (as Otto von Bismarck, Chancellor of the German Empire)
- A step forward (Serial TV) (2007)
- Decisions (Serial TV) (2007)
- The Beheaded Rooster (2007)
- Love like in the movies (Serial TV) (2007)
- Primo Carnera (2007)
- Mafalda di Savoy (2006)
- Sweeney Todd (2006)
- Only Love (TV) (2005)
- The Cave - The Cave (2005)
- Vlad Immortal (2000)
- Une mère fait comme on n'en plus (1997)
- Day Man (1997)
- Long train journey (1997)
- Eyes not seen (1994)
- Ábel rengetegben (1994)
- Sing Cowboy Sing! (1981)
- Mountains in Flames (1980)
- At the crossroads of major storms (1980)
- Last frontier of death (1979)
- Independence War (TV) (1977)
- Vlad the Impaler (1976)
- Here they do not go (1975)
- Dimitrie Cantemir (1973)

== Sources ==
- Astăzi e ziua ta: Vlad Rădescu , 17 noiembrie 2011, Loreta Popa, Jurnalul Național
- Interviu cu Vlad Rădescu(2000) author: Raluca Alexandrescu,Observator Cultural
- În telenovele joc ceea ce nu sunt, un om bogat și rău Interviu din "Bună Ziua Făgăraș"
