= Mircea Albulescu =

Romanian actor

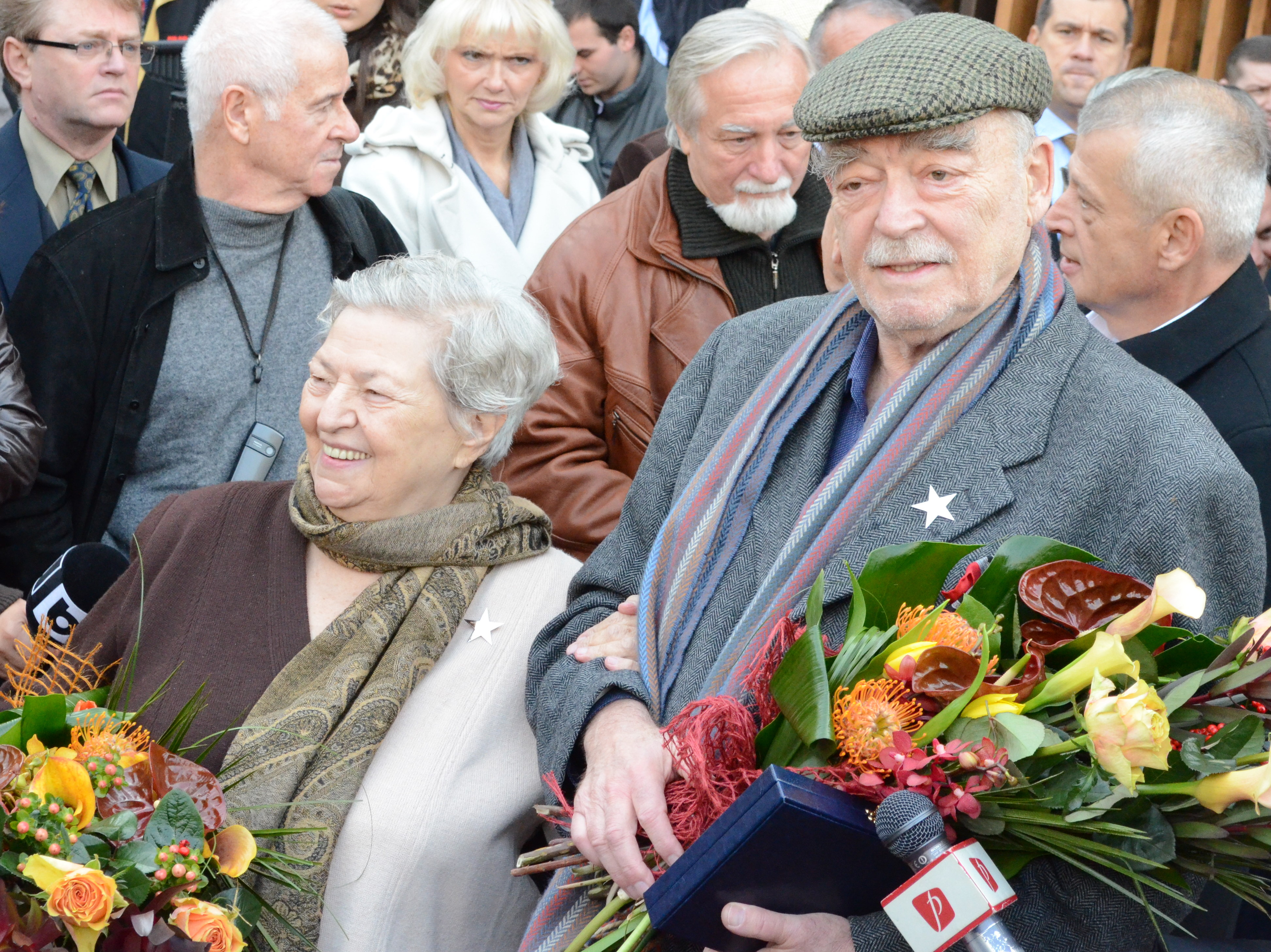
- Draga Olteanu Matei and Albulescu received each a star on Romanian Walk of Fame in Bucharest
- Born: Iorgu Constantin Albulescu; 4 October 1934; Bucharest, Kingdom of Romania
- Died: 8 April 2016 (aged 81); Bucharest, Romania
- Resting place: Reînvierea Cemetery, Bucharest
- Education: Institute of Theatrical and Cinematographic Art
- Occupations: Actor; professor; journalist; writer

Iorgu Constantin Albulescu (4 October 1934 – 8 April 2016), known professionally as Mircea Albulescu (Romanian pronunciation: [ˈmirtʃe̯a albuˈlesku]), was a Romanian actor, university professor, journalist, poet, writer, and member of the Writers' Union of Romania (Uniunea Scriitorilor).

He was born as Iorgu Constantin V. Albulescu, in Bucharest, on 4 October 1934. He graduated from the Secondary School of Architecture in 1952, and in 1956 he graduated from the Institute of Theatrical and Cinematographic Art in Bucharest. He received a star on the Romanian Walk of Fame in Bucharest on 29 October 2011.

Albulescu died on 8 April 2016 at Floreasca Hospital due to heart failure and was buried in Bucharest's Reînvierea Cemetery.

== Filmography ==
- Pasărea furtunii (1957)
- Dacii (1967)
- Aventurile lui Tom Sawyer (1968)
- Moarte lui Joe Indianul (1968)
- Vin cicliștii (1968)
- Sick Animals (1970)
- Canarul și viscolul (1970)
- Prea mic pentru un război atît de mare (1970)
- Sentința (1970)
- Printre colinele verzi (1971)
- Michael the Brave (1971)
- Puterea și adevărul (1972)
- Bariera (1972)
- Lupul Mărilor (1972)
- Șapte zile (1973)
- Capcana (1974)
- Dincolo de nisipuri (1974)
- Tatăl risipitor (1974)
- Trei scrisori secrete (1974)
- The Actor and the Savages (1975)
- Cursa (1975)
- Nu filmăm să ne amuzăm (1975)
- Zile fierbinți (1975)
- Dincolo de pod (1976)
- Ultima noapte a singurătății (1976)
- Tufă de Veneția (1977)
- Acțiunea Autobuzul (1978)
- Ediție specială (1978)
- Mânia (1978)
- Pentru patrie (1978)
- Revanșa (1978)
- Drumuri în cumpănă (1979)
- Uncle Marin, the Billionaire (1979)
- Mihail, câine de circ (1979)
- Brațele Afroditei (1979)
- Un om în loden (1979)
- Vacanță tragică (1979)
- Cumpăna (1980)
- Ancheta (1980)
- The Actress, the Dollars and the Transylvanians (1980)
- Capcana mercenarilor (1981)
- Înghițitorul de săbii (1982)
- Orgolii (1980)
- Semnul șarpelui (1980)
- La capătul liniei (1983)
- Dragostea și revoluția (1983)
- Amurgul fântânilor (1984)
- Horea (1984)
- Ziua Z (1985)
- The Last Assault (1986)
- Punct și de la capăt (1987)
- Trenul de aur (1987)
- Cuibul de viespi (1987)
- Anotimpul iubirii (1987)
- Cale liberă (1987)
- Totul se plătește (1987)
- Flăcări pe comori (1988)
- The Son of the Stars (1988)
- Dreptatea (1989)
- Portret anonim – autor necunoscut (1989) (unreleased)
- Călătorie de neuitat (1989)
- Misiunea (1989)
- Serenadă pe Dunăre (1989)
- Wilhelm Cuceritorul (1989)
- Rămânerea (1990)
- Fără drept de corespondență (1990)
- The Earth's Most Beloved Son (1993)
- Ultimul mesager (1994)
- Le travail de furet (1994)
- Le passage (1994
- Craii de Curtea-veche (1995)
- Ochii care nu se văd... (1995)
- Scrisorile prietenului (1995)
- Semne în pustiu (1996)
- Regina (2008)
- Fetele Marinarului (2009)
- Ana (2014)
- Aniversarea (2017)
