= Exam (2003 film) =

2003 film

- Directed by: Titus Muntean
- Starring: Marius Stănescu; Gheorghe Dinică
- Release date: 31 October 2003
- Running time: 90 minutes
- Country: Romania
- Language: Romanian

Exam (Romanian: Examen) is a 2003 Romanian drama film directed by Titus Muntean.

== Cast ==
- Marius Stănescu as Cristi Sandulescu
- Gheorghe Dinică as Dumitrascu
- Clara Vodă as Nora Sandulescu
- Gheorghe Visu as Stanciu
- Coca Bloos as Doina Ruznici
- Valentin Uritescu as Nea Grigore
- Alexandra Dinu as Alina Bradean
- Mihai Dinvale as Mircea
- Lucian Ifrim as Cosma Ruznici
- Alexandru Bindea as Maior militie
- Eugen Cristian Motriuc as Capitan miliitie
- Emil Hostina as Lt. Major militie

== Reception ==
Exam received positive reviews in Romania but was not widely distributed internationally.
