= Hello! How Are You? =

- Film poster
- Romanian: Bună, ce faci?
- Directed by: Alexandru Maftei
- Written by: Lia Bugnar; Alexandru Maftei
- Produced by: Tudor Reu; Antoni Sole Vinas; Maurizio Santarelli; Pierfrancesco Fiorenza
- Starring: Dana Voicu; Ionel Mihăilescu; Paul Diaconescu
- Music by: Dragoș Alexandru
- Release date: 4 March 2011 (TIFF)
- Running time: 105 minutes
- Country: Romania
- Language: Romanian

Hello! How Are You? (Romanian: Bună, ce faci?) is a 2011 Romanian romantic comedy film directed by Alexandru Maftei. The film follows a couple whose relationship has become routine and stale after 20 years of marriage.

== Release ==
The film was screened at the Brussels Film Festival with the support of ICR Brussels.

== Awards ==
It was nominated at the Gopo Awards for best cinematography, best editing, best original score, and best make-up. It won the award for best make-up.

== Cast ==
- Dana Voicu as Gabriela
- Ionel Mihăilescu as Gabriel
- Paul Diaconescu as Vladimir
- Ana Popescu as Toni
- Ioan Andrei Ionescu as Marcel
- Sabrina Iașchevici as Miruna Jipescu (as Sabrina Iașchievici)
- Adrian Păduraru as Teacher
- Antoaneta Cojocaru as Natalia
- Ioana Abur as Silvia
- Adrian Buliga as George
- Cristi Toma as Tomiță
- Sergiu Marin as Sebi
- Gabriel Spahiu as Iorgu (as Gabi Spahiu)
- Iulia Boroș as Luminița
