= The Son of the Stars =

1988 film

- Directed by: Mircea Toia, Călin Cazan, Dan Chisovsky
- Written by: Mircea Toia
- Produced by: Silvia Florescu
- Starring: Ion Caramitru, Virgil Ogășanu, Mircea Albulescu, Mirela Gorea, Ovidiu Schumacher, Marcel Iureș
- Cinematography: Roxana Mihalcea
- Music by: Ștefan Elefteriu
- Production company: Animafilm
- Distributed by: Româniafilm
- Release date: 17 October 1988
- Running time: 79 minutes
- Country: Romania
- Language: Romanian

The Son of the Stars (original Romanian title: Fiul stelelor) is a 1988 Romanian science fiction animation film directed and written by Mircea Toia. The screenplay is inspired by the novel The Jungle Book (1894) by Rudyard Kipling. The Son of the Stars combines elements of science fiction with elements from fairy tales, being made with a small team and a low budget.

== Plot ==
The story takes place in the distant future (around the year 6470) and follows the adventures of a little boy, born on a spaceship, who is separated from his parents on the way back to Earth. Raised by a group of kindly castaway aliens, the boy grows up and seeks to make his way off planet, only to discover that a cosmic entity has been trapping various species within the surrounding Van Kleef Belt. Teaming up with the various aliens, the boy attains grand powers and frees everyone from Van Kleef's grip.

== Cast ==
- Mihai Cafrița (voice) — Dan
- Ion Caramitru (voice) — Narrator
- Virgil Ogășanu (voice) — Alex, Dan's father
- Mircea Albulescu (voice) — Van Kleef
- Mirela Gorea (voice) — Roxana, Dan's mother
- Ovidiu Schumacher (voice) — Nod
- Marcel Iureș (voice) — BOB, a supercomputer
- Alexandrina Halic (voice) — Bu
- Valeria Ogășanu (voice) — Dan in childhood
- Mihai Niculescu (voice) — Knight
- Constantin Diplan (voice) — Skyl
- Ștefan Sileanu (voice) — No
