= The Earth's Most Beloved Son =

- Directed by: Șerban Marinescu
- Written by: Marin Preda
- Starring: Ștefan Iordache; Gheorghe Dinică
- Release date: 1993
- Running time: 110 minutes
- Country: Romania
- Language: Romanian

The Earth's Most Beloved Son (originally Cel mai iubit dintre pământeni) is a 1993 Romanian drama film, directed by Șerban Marinescu, based on the novel Cel mai iubit dintre pământeni by Marin Preda.

== Cast ==
- Ștefan Iordache – Victor Petrini
- Gheorghe Dinică – Securitate investigator
- Dorel Vișan – Guardian "Dumnezeu"
- Maia Morgenstern – Matilda
- Tora Vasilescu – Nineta
- Mircea Albulescu – inmate Grecul
- Victor Rebengiuc – apparatchik
- Valentin Uritescu – Dr. Marcu
- Colea Răutu – Traian Petrini
- Emil Hossu – Iustin Comănescu
- Mitică Popescu – Securitate officer
- Ștefan Bănică – rodent exterminator Belitu
