= Coca Bloos =

Romanian actress

- Born: 1 October 1946 (age 79); Piatra Neamț, Romania
- Occupation: Actress
- Years active: 1988–present

Coca Bloos (born 1 October 1946) is a Romanian actress. She appeared in more than forty films since 1988.

Born in Piatra Neamț, she graduated with a philology degree from Babeș-Bolyai University in 1969. She then worked as a journalist in Sibiu for four years, before joining the North Theatre ensemble in Satu Mare. In 1973, she played in The Cow's War by Roger Avermaete, directed by Alexandru Tocilescu; after the success of the play, she decided to pursue an acting career.

== Selected filmography ==
Year	Title	Role	Notes
1989	Secretul armei... secrete!	The governess	
1991	Vinovatul		
1992	Divorț... din dragoste	The witch	
1992	Secretul armei... secrete!	The Judge	
1993	The Conjugal Bed	Carolina Potop	
1993	E pericoloso sporgersi	The headmistress	
1994	Crucea de piatră	Venerica Cocean	
2001	The Afternoon of a Torturer	Franț's wife	
2002	Occident	Mihaela's mother	
2003	Exam	Doina Ruznici	
2003	Niki and Flo	Poucha Ardelean	
2010	Iubire și onoare		
2011	Loverboy		
2012	Everybody in Our Family		
2019	Zavera	Tia	
2012	Ice Age Continental Drift	Granny (Romanian dubbing)	
