= Ariel Levy =

Ariel Levy may refer to:

- Ariel Levy (writer) (born 1974), American journalist
- Ariel Levy (actor) (born 1984), Chilean actor and singer
