= Miss Christina (2013 film) =

- Directed by: Alexandru Maftei
- Written by: Alexandru Maftei
- Based on: Miss Christina by Mircea Eliade
- Starring: Ioana Anastasia Anton; Maia Morgenstern
- Production company: Abis Studio
- Distributed by: Abis Studio
- Release date: 6 June 2013 (TIFF)
- Running time: 101 minutes
- Country: Romania
- Language: Romanian

Miss Christina (Romanian: Domnișoara Christina) is a 2013 Romanian horror film directed by Alexandru Maftei. The script is based on the 1936 novella Miss Christina by Mircea Eliade. The film had 24,389 admissions in Romania, which made it the third most successful domestic film in 2013.

== Cast ==
- Ioana Anastasia Anton as Sanda
- Maia Morgenstern as Mrs. Moscu
- Tudor Istodor as Egor Pașchievici, a painter
- Toma Cuzin as ...

== See also ==
- Miss Christina (1992 film), an earlier adaptation of the same novella
