= Don't Go to the Reunion =

- Directed by: Steve Goltz
- Written by: Kevin Sommerfield
- Produced by: Kevin Sommerfield
- Starring: Stephanie Leigh Rose, Spencer Harlan, Nick Sommer
- Cinematography: Paul Bjorge
- Edited by: Steve Goltz
- Music by: J.R. Watkins
- Production company: Slasher Studios
- Distributed by: Slasher Studios
- Release date: October 12, 2013
- Running time: 75 minutes
- Country: United States
- Language: English

Don't Go to the Reunion is an 1980s slasher film homage directed by Steve Goltz and written by Kevin Sommerfield. The film had its world premiere at the Oshkosh Horror Film Festival and stars Stephanie Leigh Rose, Matty Dorschner, and Spencer Harlan. It is the first feature from Slasher Studios.

The film pays homage to the 1986 movie Slaughter High and is dedicated to the memory of actor Simon Scudamore who played Marty in the original film that died not long production on that film wrapped in 1984.

== Plot ==
Scott Rantzen (Brady Simenson) is a horror movie loving misfit who is teased by the popular students in school. When a date with the very popular and very beautiful Erica Carpenter (Stephanie Leigh Rose) backfires, he feels as though his life is ruined. Ten years later, the gang reunite for their class reunion unaware that someone lies in wait for revenge.

== Cast ==
- Stephanie Leigh Rose as Erica Carpenter
- Spencer Harlan as David Holland
- Nick Sommer as Christopher Lynch
- Brady Simenson as Scott Rantzen
- Mike Goltz as Joe Wynorski
- Matty Dorschner as Brandon Kaufman
- Johnathon Krautkramer as Jeremy Craven
- Kaleb Shorey as Scott's Brother
- Hayley San Fillippo as Kimberly Buechler
- Marla Van Lanen as Ms. Sorensen
- Tawnie Thompson as Megan Cunningham
- Hannah Herdt as Jessica Thompson
- J.R. Watkins as Jay Miner
- Andy Taylor as Hamilton Police Officer
- Jerry Lesperance as Hamilton High Principal
- Kevin Sommerfield as N.S. Killer

== Release ==
Don't Go to the Reunion premiered at the Oshkosh Horror Film Festival on October 12, 2013 and was later released on DVD through Slasher Studios.

== Reception ==
Felix Vasquez Jr. gave the film a favorable review, writing that it "Works to the beat of its own drum, delivering kills aplenty, and a very interesting whodunit mystery." Horror Society and Ain't It Cool News also reviewed Don't Go to the Reunion, with the former stating "All in all Don’t Go to the Reunion is a pretty decent slasher flick. Sure, it has its faults, but being that it was an homage to old slashers and the team’s first attempt at a feature length flick I was impressed."
