= Julieta Szönyi =

Romanian actress (1949–2025)

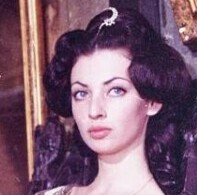
- Szönyi in Felix and Otilia, 1972
- Born: 13 May 1949; Timișoara, Romania
- Died: 18 April 2025 (aged 75)
- Education: I. L. Caragiale National University of Theatre and Film
- Occupation: Actress
- Years active: 1971–2020

Julieta Szönyi Ghiga (née Julieta Szönyi; 13 May 1949 – 18 April 2025) was a Romanian actress. She is best known for her roles as Otilia in the film Felix and Otilia (1972) and as Adnana in the television series, Toate pînzele sus (1977).

== Life and career ==
Szönyi was born in Timișoara, the daughter of painter Ștefan Szönyi and sister of actress Anca Szönyi Thomas. She moved to Bucharest when she was four years old, and graduated from the I.L. Caragiale Institute of Theatre and Film Arts (IATC).

She was married to Ákos Gálfi. She died on 18 April 2025, at the age of 75.

== Filmography ==
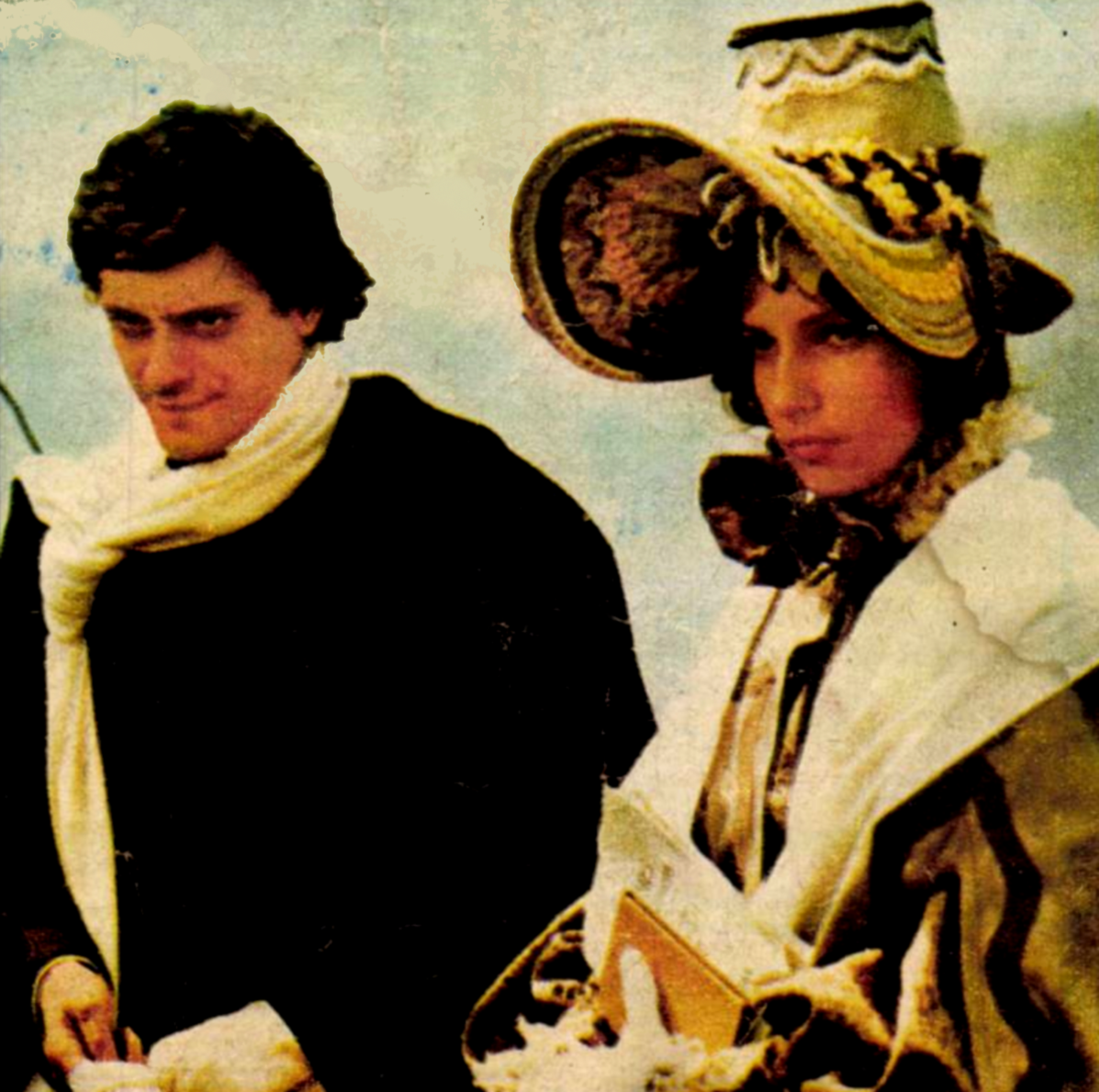
Photograph of a scene from the 1979 film Falansterul: Adrian Pintea as Teodor Diamant, and Szönyi as his (fictional) lover, Catița Fanache

- The Married Couple of the Year Two (1971) – the bride in the beginning
- Felix and Otilia (1972) – Otilia Mărculescu
- Toate pînzele sus (1976) – Adnana
- Ecaterina Teodoroiu (1978) – a lady from the Philanthropic Benevolent Society
- Falansterul (1979) – Catița Fanache
- Ora zero (1979) – Rodica
- Comoara (1983) – Maria
- Mitică Popescu (1984) – Angela
- Those Who Pay With Their Lives (1989) – Doamna T
- Iubire și onoare (2010) – Tanța Florescu
- The Whistlers (2019) – Cristi's mother
- Adventures Italian Style (2020) – the singer

== See also ==
- List of Romanian actresses
