= Tora Vasilescu =

Romanian actress

Tora Vasilescu National Order of Faithful Service
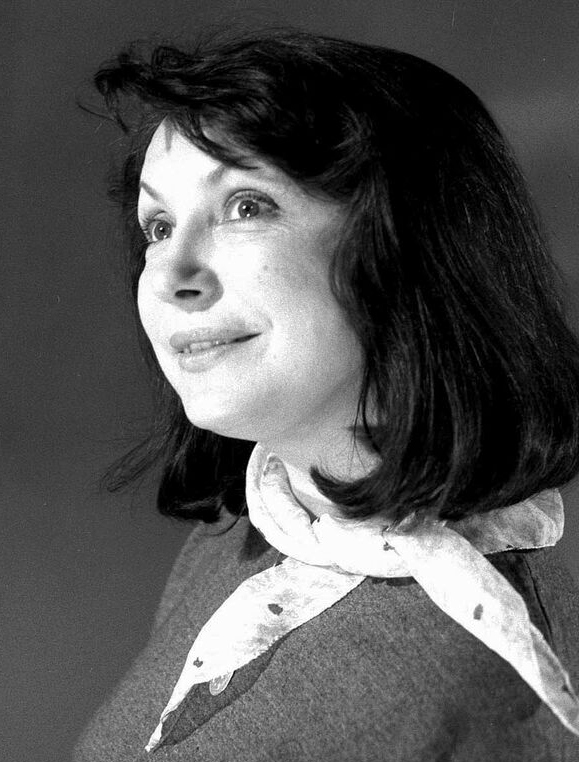
- Born: 22 March 1951 (age 75); Tulcea, Romania
- Education: Caragiale National University of Theatre and Film
- Occupation: Actor
- Years active: 1975–present
- Awards: National Order of Faithful Service

Tora Vasilescu (22 March 1951) is a Romanian actress.

She was born in Tulcea and went to local School no. 5, and then went on to High School no. 2. She showed talent for acting since she was young and later studied at the Theater Institute in Bucharest.

Vasilescu is married to Alain Vrdoljak. Previously she was married to the Romanian actor Ovidiu Moldovan and the Romanian film director Mircea Daneliuc.

In 2008 the actress whas chosen by Walt Disney Pictures to provide the Romanian voice of Merrywheater in the animated movie Sleeping Beauty. She recently appeared in the first Romanian soap opera, "Numai iubirea" ("Only Love")

== Filmography ==
- The Ride (1975)
- Carnival scenes (1981)
- Glissando (1982)
- The Earth's Most Beloved Son (1993)
- Numai iubirea (2004)
- Ultimul stinge lumina (2004) - Melania Chircu
- Păcatele Evei (2005)
- Meseriașii (2006) - Vera Pan
- Daria, iubirea mea (2006)
- Războiul sexelor (2007)
- Regina (2008)
- State de România (2009)
- Moștenirea (2010)
- Las Fierbinți (2013)
- O săptămână nebună (2014)
- Un Crăciun altfel (2014)
