= Ferenc Szőnyi =

Hungarian ultra-triathlete and ultra-runner

Ferenc Szőnyi (born 25 August 1964, in Komárom) is a Hungarian ultra-triathlete and ultra-runner.

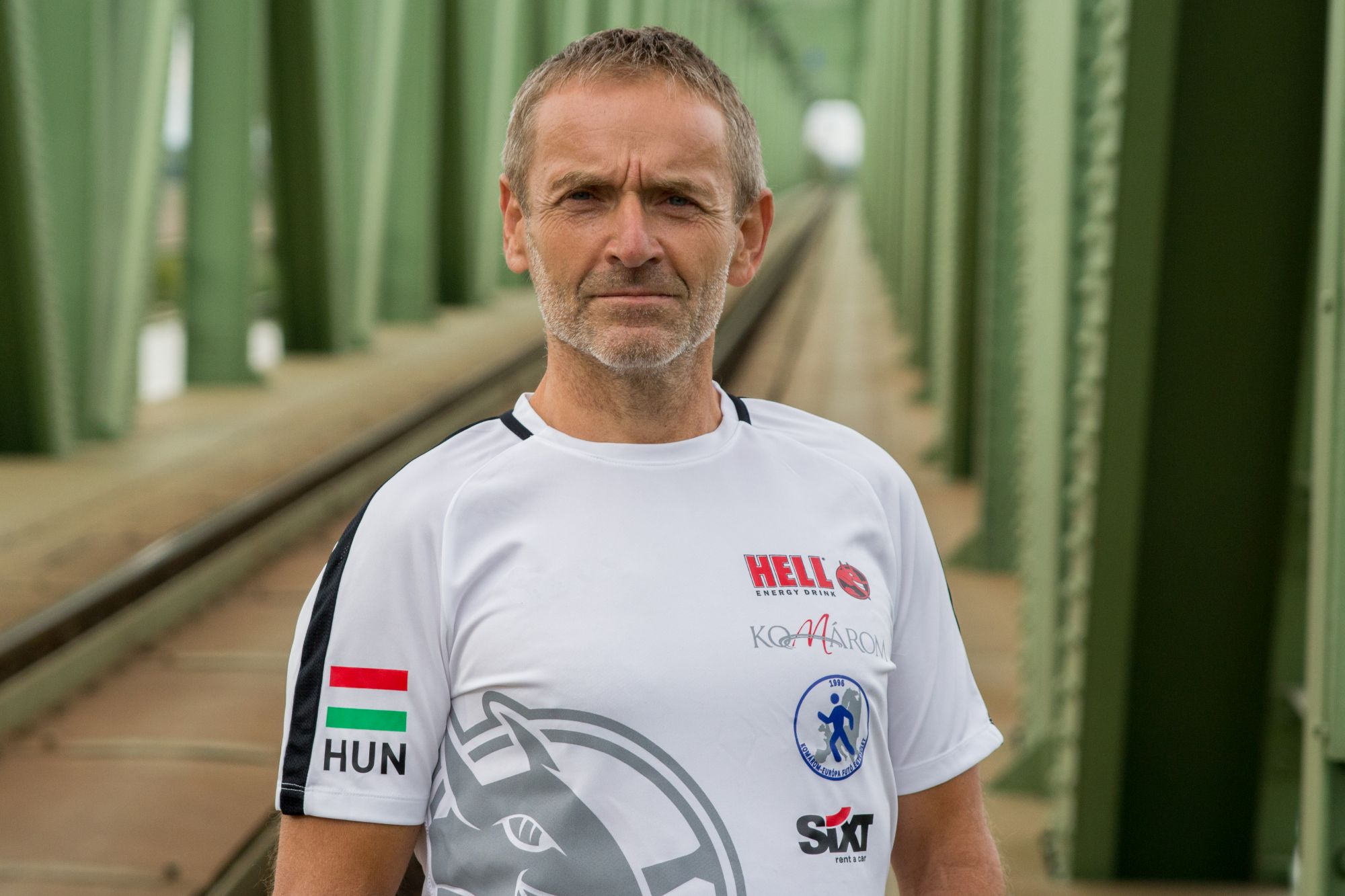
Szőnyi Ferenc

At the age of 42, he took up the triathlon and soon realized that he could excel as runner and triathlete in longer distances. He finished at 4th place in his first double Ironman race, in Bonyhád, Hungary, in 2008, after which he participated in several extreme distance events, like the Vienna–Bratislava–Budapest Supermarathon in his home country and in the Deca-Ironman, which consists of 38 kilometers of swimming, 1800 kilometers of cycling and 422 kilometers of running, and even the Double Deca-Ironman, both held in Monterrey, Mexico. In 2018, he won the Decaman ultratriathlon in New Orleans and by the president of Hungary he was bestowed Knight of the Order of Merit of the Hungarian Republic (Civilian).

== Main achievements ==
Year	Race type	Race name/venue	place/distance/time	Information, extra. Source: racemachine.blog.hu
2007	Ultramarathon	Bécs-Budapest Ultramarathon		223 km, 23 hrs
2008	Double Ironman (2 IM)	Bonyhád	4th Place	27 hours, First IronMan
2008	Deca Ironman (10 IM)	Mexico	3rd place	222hrs 17mins
2008	Marathon	Budapest Marathon		3 hrs
2008	Országos Bajnokság	Kisbér OB		100 km within 9 hrs
2008	24 hrs run	Sárvár	2nd place	219 km
2008	UltraBalaton bike ride	Ultrabalaton		206 km 5hrs 38min
2009	Szupermarathon	Bécs-Budapest Szupermarathon		within 33 hrs
2009	Double Ironman (2 IM)	Bonyhád	6th place	Two Hungarians in the finish
2009	Triple Ironman (3 IM)	Lensahn	4th place	New Hungarian Record
2009	Double Ironman (2 IM)	Slovenia	8th place	New Hungarian Record
2009	Deca Ironman (10 IM)	Mexico	1st place	Deca Ironman Winner+ World Champion + New World Record + New Deca IronMan World Record
2009	Spartathlon	Spartathlon	76th place	Spartathlon
2009	Országos Bajnokság / National Championship	Nagyatádi OB		10hrs 20min
2010	24 hour running race	Sárvár	1st place	24 hour running
2010	Race Across America	Race Across America	9th place	Race Across America
2010	Double Ironman (2 IM)	Bonyhád	6th place	Double Ironman 5 days after RAAM
2010	Double Deca Ironman (20 IM)	Mexico	1st place	Magyar győztes!/ + Double Deca Ironman
2011	24hrs bike race	Le Mans	4th place (757.48 km)	Le Mans
2011	Spartathlon	Greece	26th place (31:38:58)	Spartathlon
2011	Double Ironman (2 IM)	ENDUROMAN ultratriatlon world cup / Lanzarotte	12th place (31:49:07)	12th place on Double Ironman
2013	Tripla Deca (30 IM)	Triple Deca Ironman/Italy - Lombardia	2nd place (358:35:58)	Ferenc Szőnyi from Komárom was racing on the world's very first 30xIronMan race along with József Rokob from Győr (who finished on 1st place with 356:33:17). The participants completed one full distance IronMan triathlon every single day for 30 days, that is 3.8 km swim, 180 km ride and 42.2 km run per day.
2017	Hell Ultra Running	Himalayas	1st place (113:13:29)	480 km
2017	Deca Ironman (10 IM)	Switzerland	1st place (215:17:45)	Deca Ironman Winner
2018	DECAMAN USA	USA New Orleans	1st place (222:10:51)	Decaman + Decaman Winner
2019	4. Ultra Triathlon Rogner Bad Blumau	Austria	5th place (86:31:43)	Quintuple

In Mexico in 2009 Szőnyi set the new world record for the 10xIronman race with 115hrs time. During this race the participants completed one full distance Ironman triathlon every day for 10 consecutive days. All together these ironmen completed 38 km swim, 1800 km bike ride and 422 km run.

Szőnyi also achieved two cycling records: Within 24 hours he completed 721 km. Also, he completed 1000 km in 34 hrs. 2000-ben broke the old record

Szőnyi completed twice one of the longest and hardest land race called Spartathlon (245.3 km) and one of the longest bicycle race called Race Across America (4800 km).

In his civil life he works in the construction business. He is a father of 4.
