= Mircea Daneliuc =

Romanian film director

- Born: Mircea Ștefan Daneliuc; 7 April 1943 (age 83); Hotin, Kingdom of Romania (present day Ukraine)
- Occupations: Film director Screenwriter; Actor
- Years active: 1975–present

Mircea Daneliuc (Romanian pronunciation: [ˈmirtʃe̯a daneˈljuk]; born 7 April 1943) is a Romanian film director, screenwriter and actor. He has directed 19 films since 1975. In 1993 his film The Conjugal Bed was entered into the 43rd Berlin International Film Festival. Two years later, his film The Snails' Senator was entered into the 1995 Cannes Film Festival.

As one of the most prominent Romanian film directors of the 1980s, his films mixed realism and parables, enabling him to convey uncensored criticism towards the communist regime.

== Selected filmography ==
- Cursa (The Ride) (1975)
- Ediţie specială (Special Issue) (1977)
- Probă de microfon (Microphone Test) (1980)
- Vânătoarea de vulpi (Foxhunting) (1980)
- Croaziera (The Cruise) (1981)
- Glissando (1984)
- Iacob (1988)
- A 11-a poruncă (The 11-th Commandment) (1991)
- Tusea şi junghiul (The Toothless War) (1992)
- Patul conjugal (The Conjugal Bed) (1993)
- Această lehamite (Fed Up) (1994)
- Senatorul melcilor (The Snail's Senator) (1995)
- Ambasadori, căutam patrie (Ambassadors, Seek Country) (2003)
- Sistemul nervos (The Nervous System) (2005)
- Legiunea straină (The Foreign Legion) (2008)
- Marilena (2009)
- Cele ce plutesc (Floating Things) (2009)

== Writer ==
- Pisica ruptă (Breaking Off) (1997)
- Marilene (Marilenes) (1999, 2005)
- Şchiopul cu frumos miros (Good Smelling Lame) (1999)
- Doi pinguri (Two Ponelies) (2000)
- Apa din cizme (Water in the Wadders) (2000, 2006)
- Strigoi fără ţară (No Country Ghosts) (2001)
- Petru şi Pavel (Peter and Paul) (2003)
- Carlo Carlini, iluzionism (Carlo Carlini, Illusion Show) (2003)
- Femei în ghips (Gyps Women) (2005)
- Ora lanti (2007)
- Cele ce plutesc (Floating Things) (2009)
- Doua spălări pe cap (A Couple Of Hair Washings) (2010)
- Baiatul fara sprancene (The boy without eyebrows) (2012)
- Ca un grătar de mici (Like a barbecue grill)(2013)
- Dulci meleaguri (Pays de douceur)(2016)
- Andreas, Andrada(2016)
- Coma hindusă(2021)

== Stage director ==
- Emigranţii (The Emigrants, by S. Mrozeck) (1977) (Little Theater, Bucharest)
- Regele desculţ (The Barefoot King, by Paul Anghel) (1978) (Bulandra Theater, Bucharest)
- O noapte furtunoasă (A Crazy Night, by I.L. Caragiale) (1998) (Braila Theater)
- Doi Pinguri (Two Ponelies, by Mircea Daneliuc) (2006) (Craiova Theater)
