= Ancheta =

Ancheta is a surname. Notable people with the surname include:

- Atilio Ancheta (born 1948), Uruguayan soccer player
- Emiliano Ancheta (born 1999), Uruguayan soccer player
- Isidro Ancheta (1882–1946), Filipino landscape painter
- Nelson Mauricio Ancheta (born 1963), Salvadoran soccer player and manager
- Steve Ancheta (born 1969), American soccer player
