= Anca Szönyi Thomas =

Romanian actress

- Born: 22 April 1958; Bucharest, Romania
- Other names: Anca Nicola, Anca S. Thomas
- Occupations: actress, visual artist

Anca Szönyi Thomas (born 22 April 1958) is a Romanian visual artist and actress.

== Education ==
She graduated in 1982 from the Faculty of Monumental Art and Restoration of the Bucharest National University of Arts.

== Personal life ==
She is the daughter of the painter Ștefan Szönyi and sister of the actress Julieta Szönyi.

She settled in France in 1987 and married French politician and businessman Jean-Pierre Thomas (born 1957) in 1993. They have a daughter Diane-Emmanuelle (born 1996).

== Filmography ==
- Tănase Scatiu - Mary (1976)
- The three seal mace - Maria, daughter of István Jósika (1977)
- Blauvogel (1979)
- Burebista - Lydia, wife of Hybrida (1980)
- Dangerous Turn - Lt. Sultana Mihăilescu (1983)
- The Mysteries of Bucharest - Aneta of the Bearded Man from Delea Veche (1983)
- Ciuleandra - Mădălina Faranga (1985)
- Manjun et Layla - Layla (1989)
- C'est quoi ce petit boulot? - radio hostess (1991)
- Le Passage (1991)
- Oglinda - Petersen, Killinger's secretary (1994)
