= Coca Andronescu =

Romanian actress

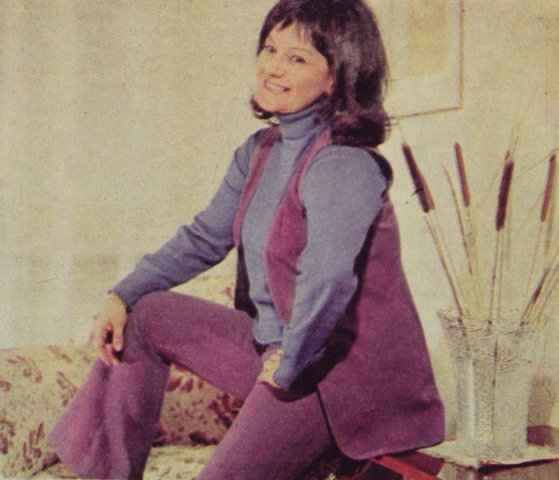
- Born: Lucreția Andronescu; July 3, 1932; Pătârlagele, Buzău County, Kingdom of Romania
- Died: August 5, 1998 (aged 66); Bucharest, Romania
- Resting place: Bellu Cemetery
- Occupation: Actress
- Years active: 1959–1989 (film)
- Spouse: Andrei Bursaci
- Awards: Order of Cultural Merit (Romania)

Coca Andronescu (3 July 1932 – 5 August 1998) was a Romanian stage, television and film actress.

In 1967, she was awarded the Order of Cultural Merit, 4th class.

== Selected filmography ==
- Telegrame (1960)
- Bădăranii (1960)
- Nu vreau să mă însor (1961)
- Dragoste la Zero Grade (1964)
- Titanic Waltz (1964)
- Șeful sectorului suflete (1967)
- Comedie fantastică (1975)
- Singurătatea florilor (1976)
- Serenadă pentru etajul XII (1976)
- Tufă de Veneția (1977)
- Eu, tu, și... Ovidiu (1978)
- Expresul de Buftea (1979)
- Vacanță tragică (1979)
- Alo, aterizează străbunica!... (1981)
- Masca de argint (1985)
- Colierul de turcoaze (1986)
- Cuibul de viespi (1986)
- În fiecare zi mi-e dor de tine (1988)

== Bibliography ==
- Peter Cowie & Derek Elley. World Filmography: 1967. Fairleigh Dickinson University Press, 1977.
