= Alexandru Maftei =

Romanian film director

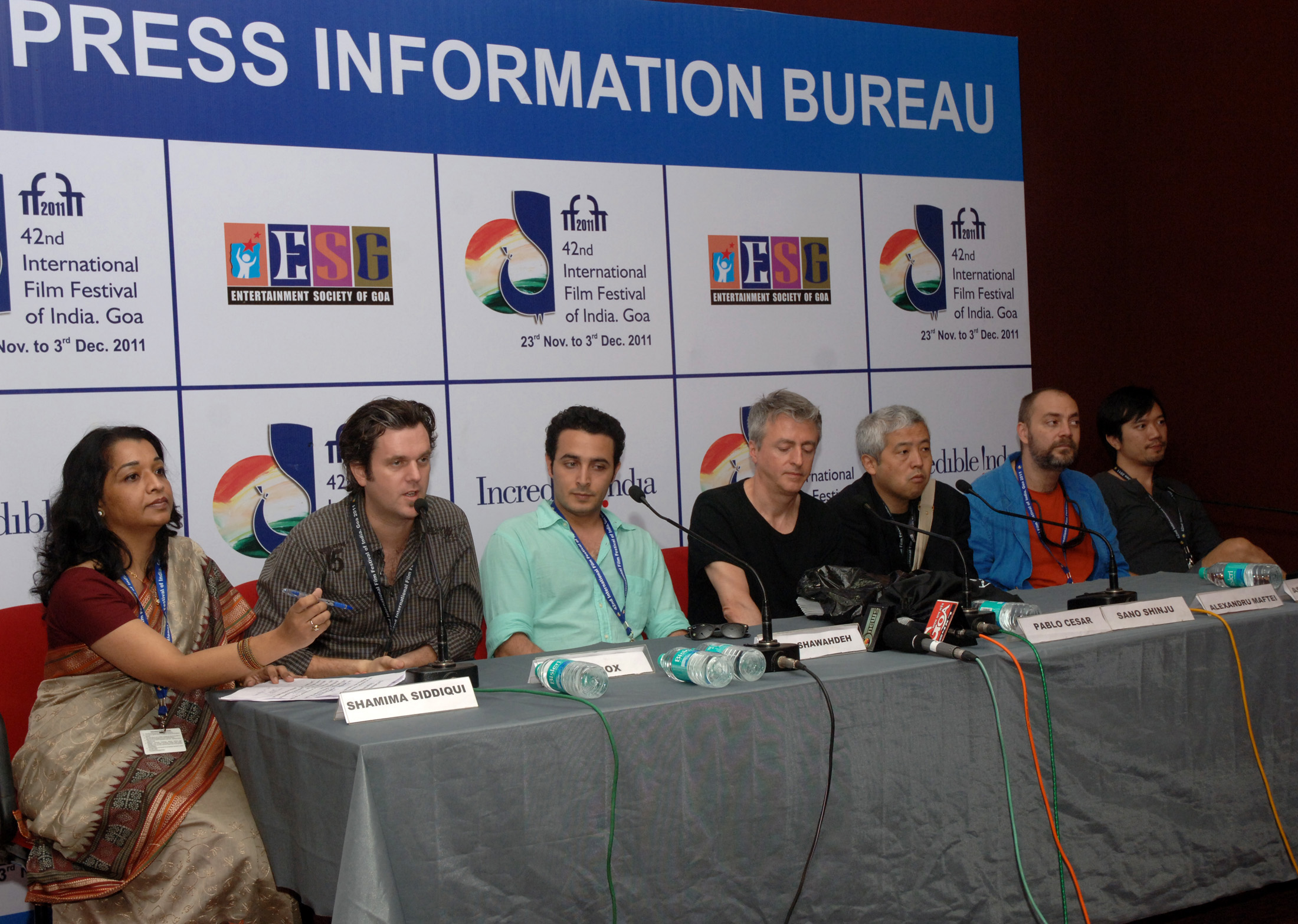
- Alexandru Maftei (left), IFFI (2011)
- Occupation: Film director

Alexandru Maftei is a Romanian film director. He graduated from the Caragiale Academy of Theatrical Arts and Cinematography in 1994. His first feature film was Fii cu ochii pe fericire from 1999. After that he worked in advertisement and television for several years before he made his second feature film, the romantic comedy Hello! How Are You? from 2011. His film Miss Christina was the third most successful domestic film in Romania in 2013.

== Filmography ==
- În fiecare zi e noapte (1995) - short film
- Fii cu ochii pe fericire (1999)
- Lombarzilor 8 (2006) - TV series, 7 episodes
- Cu un pas înainte (2007) - TV series, 3 episodes
- Hello! How Are You? (Bună, ce faci?) (2011)
- Miss Christina (Domnișoara Christina) (2013)
