= Maia Morgenstern =

Romanian actress (born 1962)

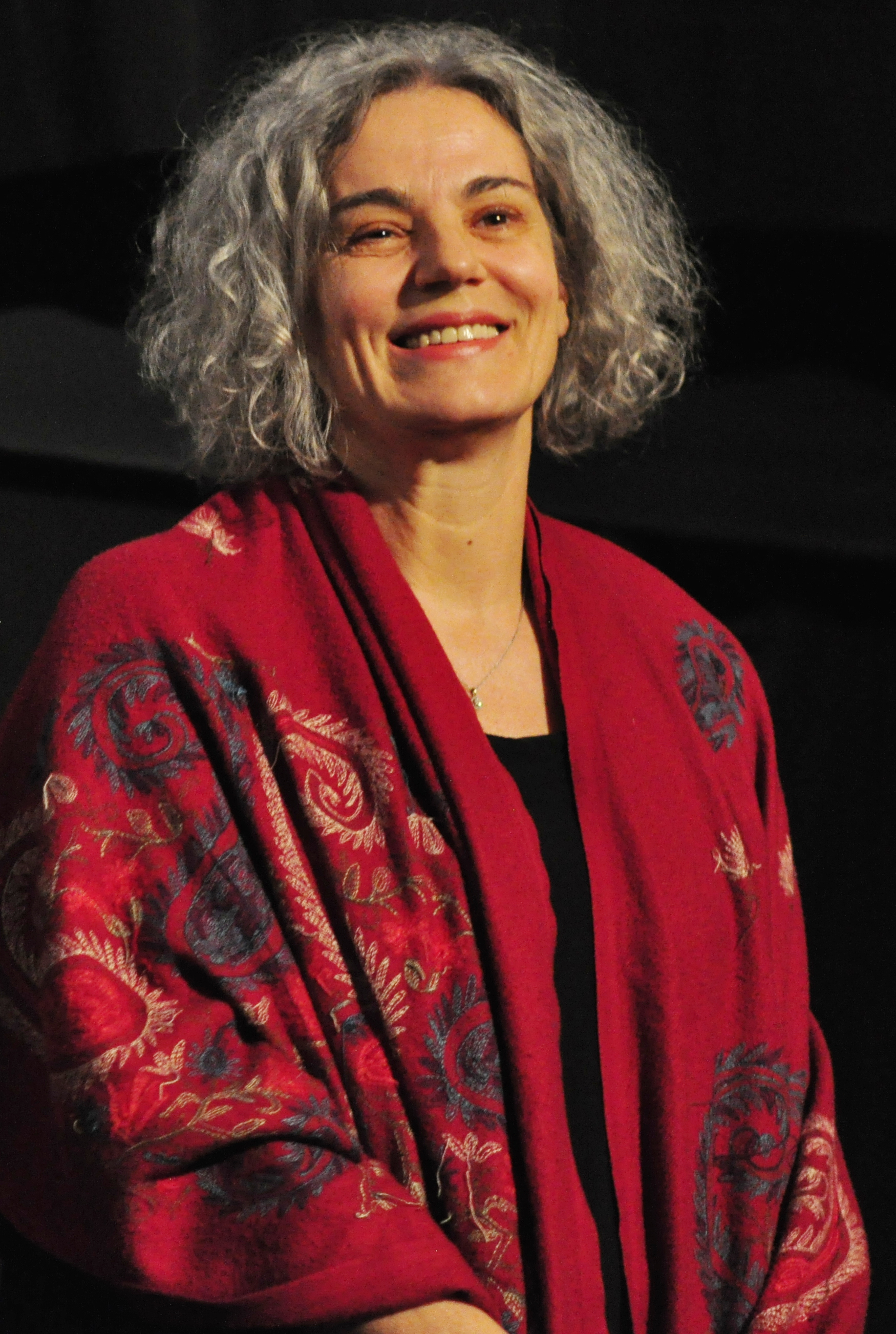
- Morgenstern in November 2018
- Born: Maia Emilia Ninel Morgenstern; 1 May 1962 (age 64); Bucharest, Romania
- Education: I. L. Caragiale Institute of Theatre and Film
- Occupation: Actress
- Years active: 1980–present
- Known for: The Blessed Virgin Mary in The Passion of the Christ
- Television: Aniela (2009); Iubire și onoare (2010–11); Las Fierbinți (2012–14)
- Spouses: Claudiu Istodor (m. 1983–1999) Dumitru Băltățeanu (m. 2001–2015)
- Children: 3, including Tudor Aaron
- Parents: Usher Morgenstern (father); Sara Rappaport (mother)

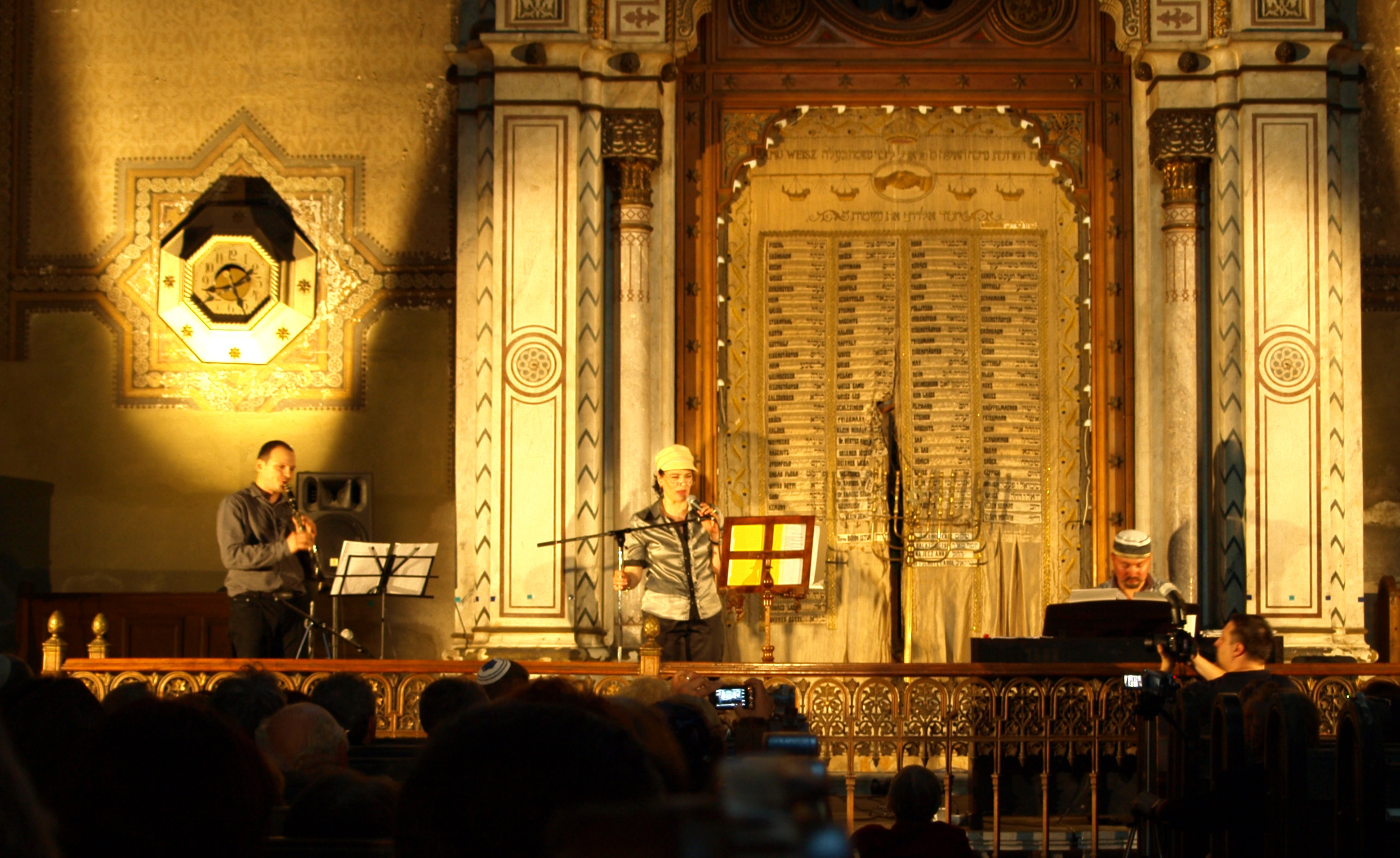
Maia Morgenstern in concert, singing Jewish songs. Timișoara, Romania, 25 May 2010.

Maia Emilia Ninel Morgenstern (Romanian pronunciation: [ˈmaja ˈmorɡənʃtern]; born 1 May 1962) is a Romanian film and stage actress. Internationally, she is best known for portraying the Blessed Virgin Mary in Mel Gibson's The Passion of the Christ. In Romania, she has been nationally known since her role as Nela in the 1992 film Balanța, known in the United States as The Oak, set during the waning days of Communist Romania. She received a star on the Romanian Walk of Fame in Bucharest on 1 May 2011. In 2007, she was described by Florin Mitu of AMOS News as "a symbol of Romanian theater and film".

== Biography ==
Born in Bucharest, Romania, to a Jewish family, she attended the Zoia Kosmodemianskaia High School in her native city, and graduated from the Film and Theatre Academy of Bucharest in 1985. Her father was a Bessarabian Jew. She then played at Teatrul Tineretului (Youth Theatre) in Piatra Neamț until 1988, and at the Teatrul Evreiesc de Stat (State Jewish Theatre) in Bucharest 1988, 1989, and 1990. From 1990 to 1998 she was a member of the company of the National Theatre in Bucharest, and since 1998 of Teatrul Bulandra, also in Bucharest. She continues to act at the Jewish State Theatre, other Bucharest theatres and theatres elsewhere in Romania. Among her notable stage roles in recent years, is a Romanian-language production of The Blue Angel (Îngerul Albastru in Romanian) at Bucharest's Odeon Theatre. In 2001 - 2002 she played, to great critical acclaim, Lola Lola, the character made famous by Marlene Dietrich. At the same time, she also played the role of Kathleen Hogan in a Romanian-language production of Israel Horovitz's Park Your Car in Harvard Yard at the State Jewish Theatre.

Morgenstern has appeared in numerous films, primarily in Romanian-language roles. In The Passion of the Christ, she performs a role in Aramaic, but like the other actors in the cast of that film, she simply memorized her lines phonetically. She reported that she felt really proud to portray the Virgin Mary.

Her surname, Morgenstern, means "Morning Star" in German, is a title of the Virgin Mary, the character she played in The Passion of the Christ. Mel Gibson, a devout Traditionalist Catholic, thought this of great significance when casting her. In interviews, she has defended The Passion of the Christ against allegations of antisemitism, saying that the high priest Caiaphas is portrayed not as a representative of the Jewish people, but as a leader of the establishment, adding that "Authorities throughout history have persecuted individuals with revolutionary ideas."

On 29 March 2021, a Romanian man was arrested after Morgenstern received an email stating "I intend to throw her in the gas chamber".

== Personal life ==
She has been married twice, first to Claudiu Istodor (1983–1999), and then to Dumitru Băltățeanu (2001–2015). She has three children, one of them being actor Tudor Aaron.

== Awards, recognition ==
She has won several major awards as an actress:

- Best Actress for: Cei care platesc cu viața ("Those who pay with their lives", 1991), Romanian Filmmakers Union
- UNITER (Romanian Theatrical Union) Lucia Sturdza Bulandra Prize (1990) for her stage role as Medea in Trilogia antică (Ancient Trilogy), directed by Andrei Șerban.
- Best Actress for: Balanța (1992), European Film Awards
- Best Actress for: Balanța (1992), Cinéma Tout Ecran (Geneva Film Festival)
- Best Actress for: Balanța (1992), Romanian Filmmakers Union
- UNITER best actress award (1993), for her role in Ghetto at the Romanian National Theatre.
- UNITER (1995) award for her performance in the stage production of Lola Blau.
- Best Film Actress for: The Passion of the Christ (2004), Ethnic Multicultural Media Awards (EMMA Awards), UK

== Filmography ==
Where translations of titles are italicized, it indicates use of the translated title for the film in English-language release.

Destine cu parfum de lavandă	2026	Dorina	Romanian
Hoppers	2026	Insect Queen	Romanian dubbing
Wednesday	2025	Hester Frump	Romanian dubbing
What About Love	2024	Sister Martina	English, Spanish
Iubire cu parfum de lavandă	2024-2026	Dorina	Romanian
Sacrificiul	2019–2020	Eva Oprea/ Eva Ioanid	Romanian
Capra cu trei iezi	2022	Capra	Romanian
The New Gospel	2020	Mother Mary	German
Fructul oprit (TV series)	2019	Mgda Popa	Romanian
High Strung	2016	Madame Markova	English
#Selfie69	2016	Femeie Bila	Romanian
Miss Christina	2013	Mrs. Moscu	Romanian
The Secret of Polichinelle	2013	Maya	Romanian
Fata din Transilvania	2011		Romanian
La fin du silence	2011	the mother	French
Sânge Tânăr, Munți și Brazi	2011	Mama	Romanian drama
Luna verde	2010	Simona	Romanian
Iubire și onoare (TV series)	2010–2011	Marieta	Romanian
Aniela (TV series)	2009–2010	Maica Stareţa	Romanian
Eva	2009	Maria	English
The House of Terror	2008	Eszter Somos	English
Black Sea	2008	Madalina	Italian
The Fence	2007	Herman's mother	English
Mansfeld	2006	Mrs. Mansfeld	Hungarian / English / Russian / German
Margo	2006	Margo's stepmother	Romanian
Visuri otrăvite ("Poisoned Dreams")	2006	Ada's mother	Romanian
15	2005	Irene	Romanian / French
L'Homme pressé	2005, TV	Bonne de Bois de Rose	French
Orient Express	2004	Amalia Frunzetti	Romanian
Damen tango	2004		Romanian
The Passion of the Christ	2004	Mary	Aramaic
Căsătorie imposibilă ("Impossible marriage")	2004, TV series		Romanian
Bolondok éneke (Fool's Song)	2003	Gina	Hungarian / French / Romanian
A Rózsa énekei (Rose's Songs)	2003	Olga	Hungarian
Patul lui Procust (Procust's Bed); Based on Camil Petrescu's novel Patul lui Procust	2001	Doamna T.	Romanian
Dark Prince: The True Story of Dracula	2000, TV	woman at the fountain	English
Marie, Nonna, la vierge et moi	2000	Nonna	French
Kínai védelem (Chinese Defense)	1999		Hungarian
Față în față (Face to Face)	1999		Romanian
Triunghiul morții ("Triangle of Death")	1999	Regina Maria	Romanian
Az Álombánya	1998, TV, short		Hungarian
Witman fiúk (Witman Boys)	1997	Mrs. Witman	Hungarian
Omul zilei (The Man of the Day)	1997		Romanian
Ulysses' Gaze (original Greek title: Το Βλέμμα του Οδυσσέα, To Vlemma tou Odyssea)	1995	playing opposite Harvey Keitel as Ulysses' wife	English / Greek
The Seventh Chamber	1995	Edith Stein (the starring role)	Hungarian
Nostradamus	1994	Helen	English
Trahir (Betrayal, Romanian title: A trada)	1993	woman in prison	French / Romanian
Casa din vis ("The House from the Dream")	1993		Romanian
Cel mai iubit dintre pămînteni (The Earth's Most Beloved Son) based on Marin Preda's novel Cel mai iubit dintre pământeni	1993		Romanian
Balanța (The Oak)	1992	Nela (the starring role)	Romanian
Rămînerea (Forgotten by God)	1992		Romanian
Băiatul cu o singură bretea, also known as Flăcăul cu o singura bretea ("The Boy with a Single Brace")	1991		Romanian
Cei care plătesc cu viața (Those Who Pay with Their Lives)	1991		Romanian
Pasaj	1990		Romanian
Marea sfidare ("The great defiance")	1989		Romanian
Maria și marea ("Maria and the Sea")	1988	Maria	Romanian
Anotimpul iubirii (The Season of Love)	1986		Romanian
Secretul lui Bachus (The Secret of Bacchus)	1984	the girl in the restaurant (as Maia Morgenstern Istodor)	Romanian
Dreptate în lanțuri (Chained Justice)	1983		Romanian
Prea cald pentru luna mai ("Too hot for the month of May")	1983		Romanian
