= The Conjugal Bed (1993 film) =

1993 film

- Directed by: Mircea Daneliuc
- Written by: Mircea Daneliuc
- Starring: Gheorghe Dinică
- Cinematography: Vivi Dragan Vasile
- Edited by: Melania Oproiu
- Release date: February 1993
- Running time: 102 minutes
- Country: Romania
- Language: Romanian

The Conjugal Bed (Romanian: Patul conjugal) is a 1993 Romanian comedy film directed by Mircea Daneliuc. It was entered into the 43rd Berlin International Film Festival. The film was selected as the Romanian entry for the Best Foreign Language Film at the 66th Academy Awards, but was not accepted as a nominee.

== Cast ==
- Gheorghe Dinică as Vasile Potop
- Coca Bloos as Carolina Potop
- Valentin Teodosiu Teodosiu
- Lia Bugnar as Stela
- Valentin Uritescu
- Geo Costiniu
- Jana Corea
- Flavius Constantinescu
- Nicolae Praida
- Paul Chiributa
- Eugen Cristian Motriuc (as Cristian Motriuc)
- Bujor Macrin
- Dumitru Palade

== See also ==
- List of submissions to the 66th Academy Awards for Best Foreign Language Film
- List of Romanian submissions for the Academy Award for Best Foreign Language Film
