= Adrian Pintea =

Romanian actor

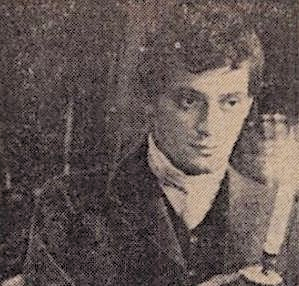
- Born: Adrian Virgil Pintea; October 9, 1954; Beiuș, Bihor County, Romanian People's Republic
- Died: 8 June 2007 (aged 52); Bucharest, Romania
- Resting place: Bellu Cemetery, Bucharest
- Education: Theatrical and Cinematographical Arts Institute
- Spouses: Silvia Mihaela Rusan (m. 1984–1995) Lavinia Pintea (m. 2000–2007)
- Partner: Irina Petrescu

Adrian Virgil Pintea (Romanian pronunciation: [adriˈan ˈpinte̯a]; 9 October 1954 – 8 June 2007) was a Romanian actor.

== Career ==
Pintea graduated from the Theatrical and Cinematographical Arts Institute in Bucharest. He appeared in the 2005 Romanian film Femeia visurilor directed by Dan Pița. Pintea made his last appearance in Francis Ford Coppola's 2007 film Youth Without Youth.

== Death ==
He died on 8 June 2007 from complications from cirrhosis, pulmonary and kidney hypertension, and was buried at Bellu Cemetery in Bucharest.

== Selected filmography ==
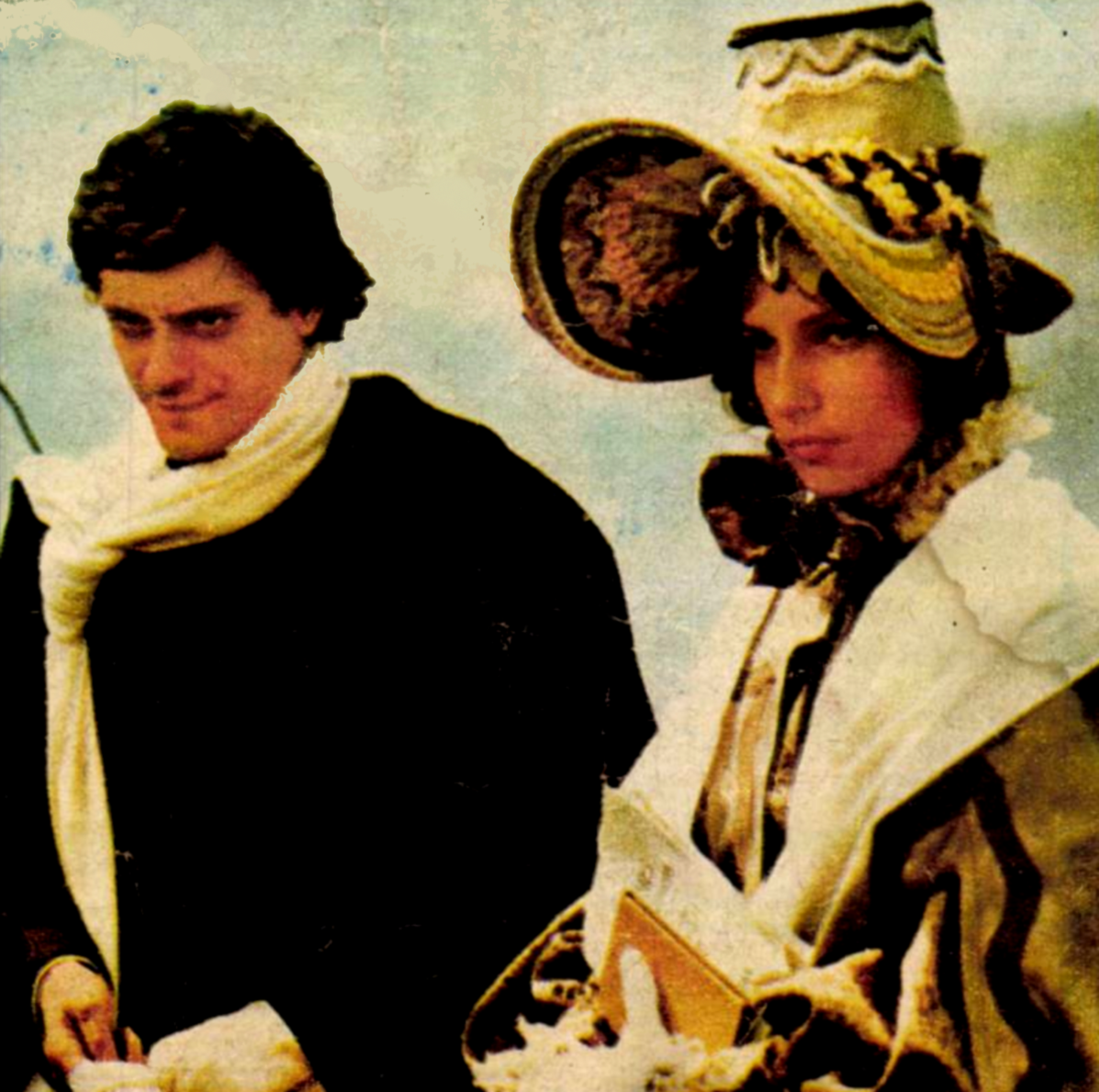
Photograph of a scene from the 1979 film Falansterul: Pintea as Teodor Diamant, and Julieta Szönyi as his (fictional) lover, Catița Fanache

- Mînia (1978), as the boy with the bird
- Aurel Vlaicu (1977), as Ștefan Octavian Iosif
- Între oglinzi paralele (1979), as George Praida
- Falansterul (1979), as Teodor Diamant
- Iancu Jianu zapciul (1981), as Iancu Jianu
- Iancu Jianu haiducul (1981), as Iancu Jianu
- Ștefan Luchian (1981), as Nicolae Tonitza
- Fapt divers (1985), as Lică
- Adela (1985), as the piano technician
- Pădureanca (1987), as Iorgovan
- Those Who Pay With Their Lives (1989), as Gelu Ruscanu
- Mircea (1989), as Vlad, the son of Mircea the Elder
- Un bulgăre de humă (1990), as Mihai Eminescu
- Duck Tales (1996), as Viking’s King (Romanian voice)
- Diplomatic Siege (1999), as Goran Mladenov
- Vlad (2003), as Iancu de Hunedoara
- 7 Seconds (film) (2005), as Grapini
