= Șerban Marinescu =

Romanian film director and screenwriter (born 1956)

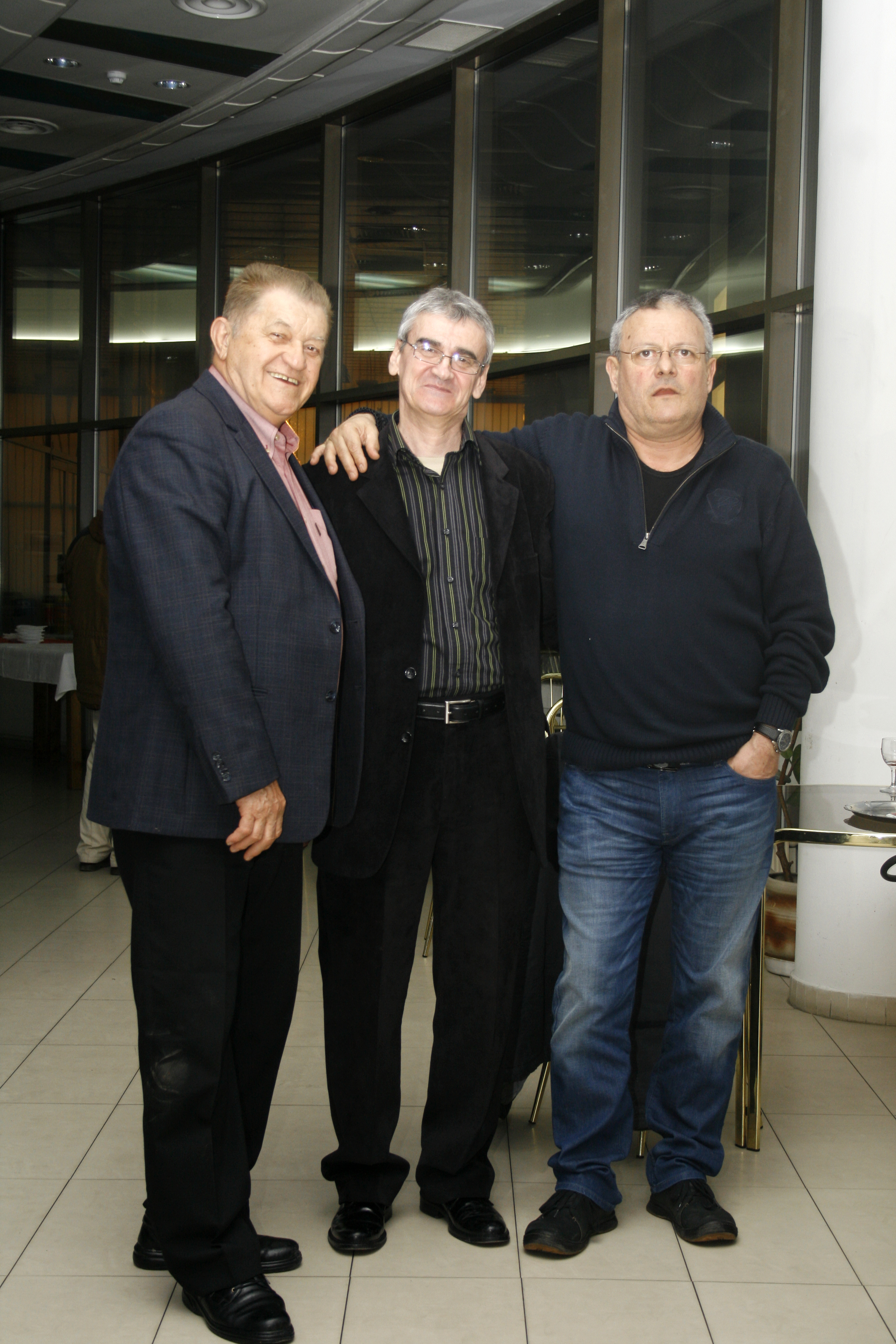
- Șerban Marinescu (right) with Dorel Vișan (left) and Corneliu Ionescu (center), 2012
- Born: 27 May 1956 (age 70); Pitești, Romania
- Occupation: Actor
- Years active: 2002–present

Șerban Marinescu (born 27 May 1956) is a Romanian film director and screenwriter.

In December 2004 he was awarded by then-President of Romania Ion Iliescu the Order of Cultural Merit, Knight rank.

== Selected filmography ==
Film
Year	Title	Role	Notes
2007	The Bastards		Romanian political film
1993	The Earth's Most Beloved Son		
1989	Those Who Pay With Their Lives		
