= Ștefan Iordache =

Romanian actor

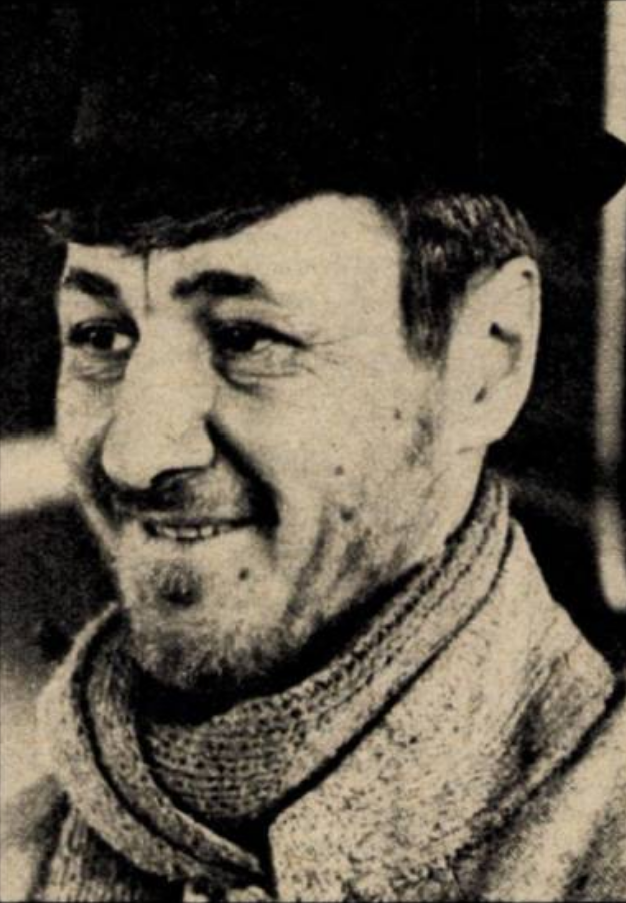
- Iordache in Întoarce-te și mai privește odată, April 1981
- Born: 3 February 1941; Calafat, Dolj County, Kingdom of Romania
- Died: 14 September 2008 (aged 67); Vienna, Austria
- Burial place: Gruiu, Ilfov County, Romania
- Education: I.L. Caragiale Institute of Theatre and Film Arts
- Occupations: Actor, singer
- Years active: 1964–2007
- Spouse: Mihaela Tonitza
- Awards: National Order of Faithful Service, Officer rank

Ștefan Iordache (Romanian pronunciation: [ʃteˈfan jorˈdake]; 3 February 1941 – 14 September 2008) was a Romanian actor.

Born in Calafat, Dolj County, he spent his childhood there before moving to the Rahova neighborhood of Bucharest. He failed being admitted into medical school, worked for a while as an accountant, and then enrolled in the I.L. Caragiale Institute of Theatre and Film Arts (IATC), he graduated from the IATC in 1963, studying acting under professor Dinu Negreanu.

In 2000, Iordache was awarded the National Order of Faithful Service, Officer rank. In 2006, he was voted the best actor in Romania. He died of leukemia, aged 67, in Vienna, Austria, and was buried with military honors in Gruiu, Ilfov County.

== Selected films ==
- Inimă de țigan (2007) — Didi Sfiosu
- The Bastards (2007) — Didi Sfiosu
- The Earth's Most Beloved Son (1993) — Victor Petrini
- Luxury Hotel (1992)
- Those Who Pay With Their Lives (1991) — Șerban Saru-Sinești
- Ciuleandra (1985)
- Glissando (1985)
- Carnival Scenes (1981)
- Bună seara, Irina! (1981) — Victor Ionescu
- Bietul Ioanide (1980) — Dumitru Dragavei
- Doctorul Poenaru (1978) — Pascal
- Ediție specială (1978) — Matei Olaru
- Războiul independenței (1977)
- Adio dragă Nela (1972) — Costică Cercel
- Un film cu o fată fermecătoare (1967) — Paul Manu
- Calea Victoriei sau cheia visurilor (1966) — Costea Lipan
- Gaudeamus igitur (1965) — Teo
- Străinul (1964) — Andrei Sabin
