= Miss Christina (novella) =

1936 Romanian novella

- First edition (publ. Cultura Națională)
- Author: Mircea Eliade
- Original title: Domnișoara Christina
- Language: Romanian
- Genre: Horror novella
- Publisher: Cultura Națională
- Publication date: 1936; 90 years ago
- Publication place: Kingdom of Romania
- Pages: 238

Miss Christina (Romanian: Domnișoara Christina) is a 1936 horror novella by the Romanian writer Mircea Eliade. It depicts a paranormal romance between a strigoi and a regular human.

== Plot ==
The novella depicts the story of the attraction between a female strigoi—an undead human from Romanian folklore—and a young man who visits the house she haunts.

== Translation ==
An English translation by Ana Cartianu was published in 1992 as part of the Eliade omnibus volume Mystic Stories.

== Film adaptations ==
The novella has been the basis for two Romanian film adaptations with the same title.
