= Valentin Uritescu =

Romanian actor (1941–2022)

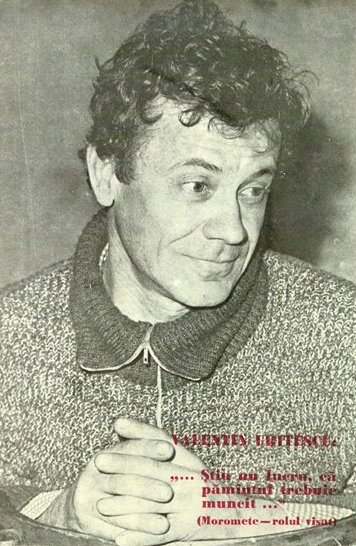
- Born: Valentin Nicolae Uritescu; 4 June 1941; Vinerea, Kingdom of Romania
- Died: 17 June 2022 (aged 81); Bucharest, Romania
- Education: Caragiale National University of Theatre and Film
- Occupation: Actor
- Years active: 1963–2022
- Awards: Order of Cultural Merit

Valentin Uritescu (Romanian pronunciation: [valenˈtin uriˈtesku]; 4 June 1941 – 17 June 2022) was a Romanian film, television, and theatre actor. He is best known for his parts in The Conjugal Bed and The Last Assault.

In 2011, Uritescu was chosen by Sony Pictures Animation to dub Grandsanta in Romanian in the animated film Arthur Christmas, King in the Cinderella movie from Disney, and many animated characters.

== Selected filmography ==
- Fructul oprit (2018) – Katia's father
- Scene de căsnicie (2008)
- Războiul sexelor (2007) – Horia's father
- Cu un pas înainte (2007) – Septimiu Baltag
- Exam (2003) – Nea Grigore
- The Conjugal Bed (1993 film)
- The Last Assault (1985) – sergeant Șaptefrați
