= Crăciunescu =

Crăciunescu is a surname of Romanian origin. People with that name include:

- Florența Crăciunescu (1955–2008), Romanian athlete (discus and shot put) who competed in the 1980 and 1984 Summer Olympics
- Ion Crăciunescu (born 1950), Romanian former football referee
- Ioana Crăciunescu (born 1950), Romanian actress and poet
