= Blestemul pământului, blestemul iubirii =

- DVD cover
- Directed by: Mircea Mureșan
- Written by: Titus Popovici
- Based on: Ion by Liviu Rebreanu
- Starring: Șerban Ionescu; Petre Gheorghiu; Ioana Crăciunescu
- Cinematography: Ion Marinescu
- Edited by: Elena Pantazica
- Music by: Nicolae Ciolca; Gheorghe Zamfir
- Production company: Casa de Filme 5
- Distributed by: România Film
- Release date: 1980
- Running time: 205 minutes
- Country: Romania
- Languages: Romanian; Hungarian

Blestemul pământului, blestemul iubirii (The curse of the land, the curse of love) is a 1981 Romanian drama film directed by Mircea Mureșan. The film is an adaptation of Liviu Rebreanu's 1920 social novel Ion, starring Șerban Ionescu as the titular character, a poor Transylvanian peasant.

The movie was mostly shot in the village of Fântânele, near Sibiu, from 5 April 1978 to 9 February 1979. The release was delayed due to concerns raised by the communist censors. The premiere took place on 14 April 1980, at the Patria Cinema in Bucharest; the film was watched by 3,469,709 spectators in Romanian cinemas.

== Cast ==
- Șerban Ionescu – Ion
- Petre Gheorghiu – Vasile Baciu
- Ioana Crăciunescu – Ana Baciu
- Leopoldina Bălănuță – Zenobia
- Octavian Cotescu – Zaharia Herdelea
- Romeo Pop – Titu Herdelea
- Tamara Buciuceanu – Maria Herdelea
- Valentin Teodosiu – Gheorghe
- Catrinel Dumitrescu – Laura
- Ion Besoiu – Priest Belciug
- Dan Nuțu – Lieutenant
- Valeria Seciu – Savista
- Costel Constantin – Count
- Rodica Negrea – Ghighi
- Zephi Alșec – Dernstein
- Jean Lorin Florescu – Innkeeper Avrum
- Sorina Stănculescu – Florica
- Dan Nasta – Protopope Pintea
- Livia Baba – Wife of protopope Pintea
- Ion Hidișan – Alexandru Pop-Glanetașu
- Christian Maurer – Inspector
- Radu Basarab – Doctor
- Hans Pomarius – Beck
- Teodor Portărescu – Mayor Florea Tancu
- Nae Floca-Acileni – Simion Butunoiu
- Mircea Hîndoreanu – Toma Bulbuc
- Petre Lupu
- Daniel Tomescu
- Ferenc Fábián
- Petre Gheorghiu – Goe, music teacher
- Rodica Nițescu
- Avram Besoiu – Marchidan
- Mircea Cruceanu
- Crina Cojocaru
- Ion Porsila
- Romulus Bărbulescu
- Constantin Stănescu
- Petre Vasilescu
- Emilia Porojan
- Paul Mocanu
- Ion Grapinni
- Stefan Erdös
- Klaus Hinn
- Conradt Kurt
- Marieta Gaspar
- Eugenia Barcan
- Traian Dragoș

== Dubbing ==
- Simona Bondoc – Wife of protopope Pintea
- Constantin Dinulescu – Beck
- Jean Constantin – Protopope Pintea
- Gheorghe Dănilă – Simion Butunoiu
- Dumitru Furdui – Alexandru Pop-Glanetașu
- Luminița Gheorghiu – Florica
- Nicolae Urs – Marchidan
- Florin Zamfirescu – Toma Bulbuc

== See also ==
- Ion: Blestemul pamîntului, blestemul iubirii at IMDb
