= Catrinel Dumitrescu =

Romanian actress

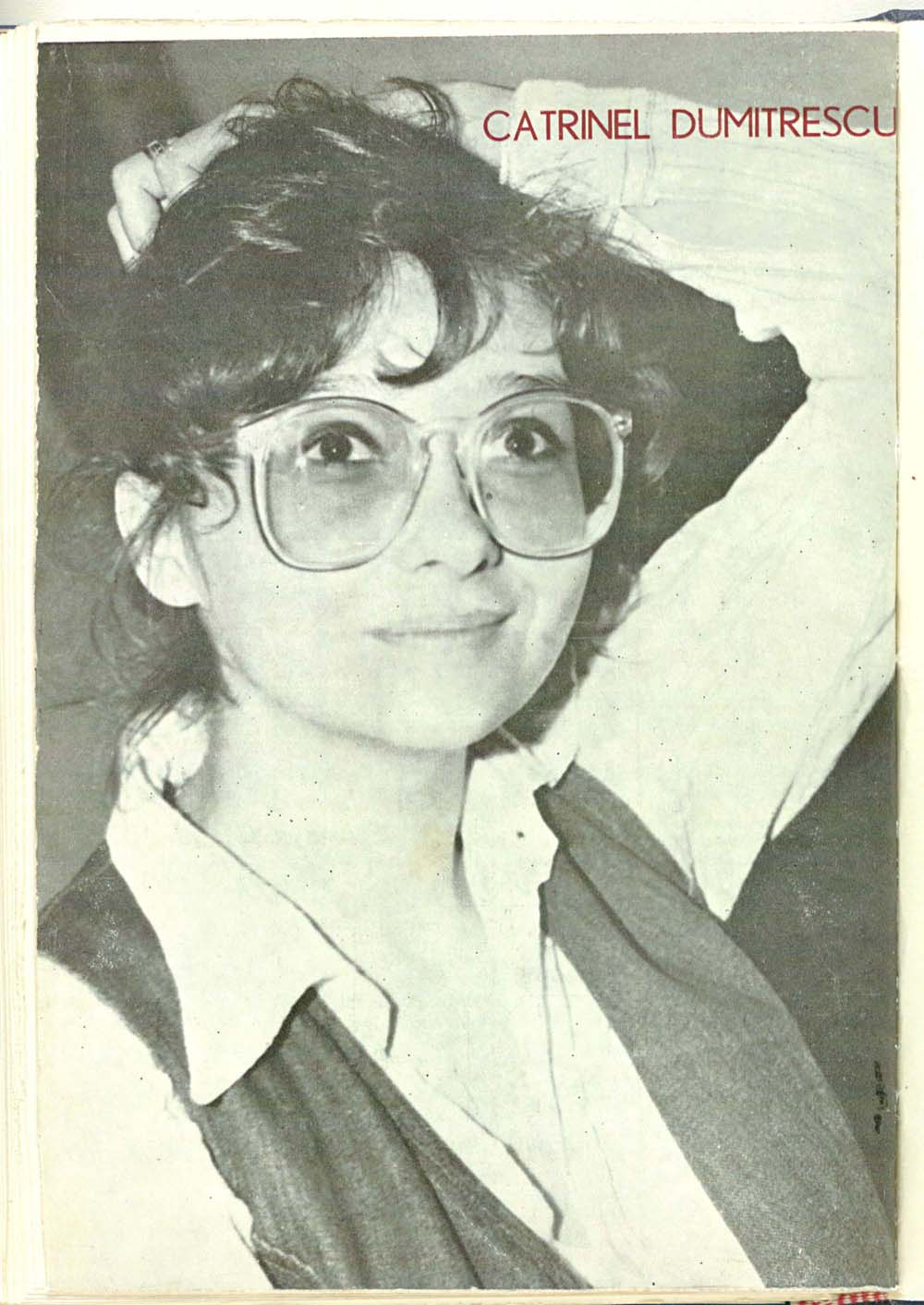
- Born: 11 October 1956 (age 69); Brăila, People's Republic of Romania
- Education: Caragiale National University of Theatre and Film
- Occupation: Actress
- Years active: 1977–present
- Employer(s): Cluj-Napoca National Theatre; Nottara Theater
- Spouse: Emil Hossu (m.???–d.2012)
- Awards: National Order of Merit (Romania) (Knight rank, 2002); Gopo Award (best supporting actress, 2012)

Catrinel Dumitrescu (born 11 October 1956) is a Romanian film and theater actress.

Born in Brăila, her debut came when she was 16, and was selected by director Alexandru Tocilescu to play a role at the local theater in the play Svanevit by August Strindberg. She graduated in 1979 from the Caragiale National University of Theatre and Film, where she studied with Octavian Cotescu and Ovidiu Schumacher. In her third year of studies she played at the Bulandra Theatre in Provincial Anecdotes by Alexander Vampilov, next to Tamara Buciuceanu, Ștefan Bănică, and Virgil Ogășanu. From 1974 to 1989 she played at the Lucian Blaga National Theater in Cluj-Napoca. Since 1991 she has played at the Nottara Theater in Bucharest.

Dumitrescu is a professor at Hyperion University of Bucharest, Faculty of Arts, Acting department. She has appeared in more than fifty films since 1977. She was married to actor Emil Hossu.

In December 2002 she was awarded by Romanian President Ion Iliescu the National Order of Merit, Knight rank. In 2012 she received the Gopo Award for best supporting actress for her role in the movie Aurora.

== Selected filmography ==
Film
Year	Title	Role	Notes
2019	Sacrificiul	Luminița	
2016	Dublu	George's mother	
2015	Live	Mămoasa	
2013	Spitalul de demență	Marița Lupulescu	
2012	Pariu cu viața	Sanda Oprea	
2011	Iubire și onoare	Paulina	
2010	Aurora	Mrs. Belinski	
2008	Regina	Paula Teodorescu	
2008	Nunta mută	Iancu's mother	
2006	La urgență	Oana's mother	
2006	Om sărac, om bogat	Victoria Prodan	
1997	Doi pe o bancă	Vera	
1987	Pădurea de fagi	Phone operator	
1987	Păstrează-mă doar pentru tine	Livia	
1985	Căsătorie cu repetiție	Silvia	
1985	Promisiuni		
1984	Ca-n filme	Sidonia	
1983	Buletin de București	Silvia	
1982	Pădurea nebună	Despa	
1981	The Pale Light of Sorrow	voice of Lina	
1980	Blestemul pământului, blestemul iubirii	Laura Herdelea	
1979	Omul care ne trebuie	Geta Mutu	
1977	Râul care urcă muntele	Doina	
