= Gheorghe Dănilă =

Romanian actor (1949–2021)

- Born: 9 April 1949; Roman, Romanian People's Republic
- Died: 1 March 2021 (aged 71); Bucharest, Romania
- Resting place: Cernica Cemetery II, Pantelimon, Ilfov, Romania
- Education: Caragiale National University of Theatre and Film
- Occupation: Actor

Gheorghe Dănilă (9 April 1949 – 1 March 2021) was a Romanian actor.

== Biography ==
Dănilă was born on 9 April 1949, in Roman. In 1975, he graduated from the Caragiale National University of Theatre and Film, where he studied under Octavian Cotescu and Ovidiu Schumacher. He was a troupe member of the Teatrul Tineretului from 1975 to 1982 and at the Comedy Theater from 1983 until his death.

Gheorghe Dănilă died in Bucharest on 1 March 2021, at the age of 71. He was buried at the Cernica Cemetery II on 5 March.

== Filmography ==
- Dumbrava minunată (1980)
- Fiul munților (1981)
- Blestemul pământului, blestemul iubirii (1981) – dubbing Simion Butunoiu
- Secretul lui Nemesis (1985)
- Un oaspete la cină (1987)
- Chirița în Iași (1988)
- Telefonul (1992)
- Secretul Mariei (2005) – The Commissioner
- Cu un pas înainte (2007) – Virgil Maier #2
- Nunta mută (2008) – Ulcior (as Puiu Dănilă)
- Legiunea străină (2008)
- State de România (2010) – The Confessor
- La bani, la cap, la oase (2010)
- Las Fierbinți (2012) – Plopu
- Când mama nu-i acasă (2017) – Nea Gelu
- O grămadă de caramele (2017) – Nea Gelu
- Moromeții 2 (2018) – man with a horse
