= If I Want to Whistle, I Whistle =

2010 film

- Film poster
- Directed by: Florin Șerban
- Written by: Florin Șerban; Cătălin Mitulescu; Andreea Vălean (play)
- Produced by: Cătălin Mitulescu; Daniel Mitulescu
- Starring: George Piștereanu
- Cinematography: Marius Panduru
- Edited by: Sorin Baican
- Release dates: 13 February 2010 (Berlinale); 26 March 2010 (Romania)
- Running time: 94 minutes
- Country: Romania
- Language: Romanian

If I Want to Whistle, I Whistle (Romanian: Eu când vreau să fluier, fluier) is a 2010 Romanian drama film directed by Florin Șerban.

== Plot ==
Romanian youth Silviu (George Piștereanu) serves a four-year prison sentence. A few days before his release, his younger brother visits him and tells him that their mother has returned, who has found work in Italy and will take the younger brother there. He says that he came by bus, but Silviu walks to the fence and sees that their mother brought him with her car. Since prisoners are not allowed to be near the fence, a guard comes to take him away, but Silviu resists. The prison director is lenient and does not press charges, so that his stay in prison is not extended.

With a mobile phone another prisoner possesses he phones his mother and urges her to visit him. She does, and tells him he can come to Italy too, after his release. He hates her for abandoning her children in the past each time she found a new lover, and blames her for being a loose woman and unfit mother, saying he does not want to come with her in Italy.

He makes acquaintance with young social worker and psychology student Ana (Ada Condeescu), who asks him to fill out a questionnaire. On the one hand he likes her, on the other hand he threatens to kill her with a piece of broken glass, and demands that his mother comes. Toward his mother he threatens to kill not only the girl but also himself, and makes her swear she will not take the brother to Italy.

Subsequently, threatening again toward the guards and police to kill her, he forces his way out of prison with her, to have a coffee together in a cafetaria. After that he walks out alone and surrenders.

== Cast ==
- George Piștereanu as Silviu
- Ada Condeescu as Ana
- Mihai Constantin as Penitenciary director
- Clara Vodă as Mother

== Awards ==
It was nominated for the Golden Bear at the 60th Berlin International Film Festival and won the Jury Grand Prix Silver Bear and the Alfred Bauer Prize. It was selected as the Romanian entry for the Best Foreign Language Film at the 83rd Academy Awards but it didn't make the final shortlist.

== See also ==
- Romanian New Wave
- List of submissions to the 83rd Academy Awards for Best Foreign Language Film
- List of Romanian submissions for the Academy Award for Best Foreign Language Film
