= Toate pînzele sus =

1977 Romanian TV series

- Genre: Adventure
- Written by: Radu Tudoran
- Screenplay by: Mircea Mureșan, Alexandru Struteanu
- Directed by: Mircea Mureșan
- Composer: Radu Șerban
- Country of origin: Romania
- Original language: Romanian
- No. of seasons: 1
- No. of episodes: 12

Production
- Production location: Romania
- Cinematography: Nicu Stan
- Editor: Maria Neagu
- Production company: Romanian Television

Original release
- Network: TVR
- Release: 13 March – 29 May 1977

Toate pînzele sus is a TV series of the Romanian Television (TVR), adapted from the novel of the same name, Toate pînzele sus! ("All Sails Up!"), written by Radu Tudoran.

== Plot summary ==
Produced between 1976 and 1978, the series presents the adventures, which became legendary, of two friends, the Romanian Anton Lupan and the French Pierre Vaillant. Anton Lupan leaves in search of the schooner L'Esperance, his and his friends' ship, without knowing that it has been attacked by pirates. But, above all, he is searching for Pierre, so they can leave together for an unknown land; those who have tried to penetrate this land have died or have returned, after terrible trials, without success in exploring it. He finds the ship, but no one knows anything about his friend. Anton Lupan is forced to leave alone to journey over the Atlantic, with Tierra del Fuego as his destination. The crew has many adventures, facing Moorish pirates and trying to save the cook when he gets in trouble by making reckless bets in Latin American ports. The men are courageous and upright, and so they manage to overcome all their trials and follow their captain with confidence in searching for his missing friend.

== Cast ==
=== Main cast ===
- Ion Besoiu – Anton Lupan
- Ilarion Ciobanu – Gherasim
- Sebastian Papaiani – Ieremia
- Jean Constantin – Ismail
- George Paul Avram – Haralamb
- Cristian Șofron – Mihu
- Julieta Szönyi – Adnana (1, 4–6, 8–12)
- the puppy Lăbuș

=== Secondary roles ===
- Ion Dichiseanu – Pierre Vaillant
- Aurel Giurumia – Agop
- Jean Lorin Florescu – Martin Strickland
- Colea Răutu – Spânu
- Ernest Maftei – old Alakaluf
- Tamara Buciuceanu – captain's wife (of the port of Sulina)
- Gheorghe Visu – Black Pedro
- Vasile Nițulescu – watchman of the Sulina lighthouse
- Alexandru Virgil Platon – pirate
- Octav Enigărescu – captain of the port of Sulina
- Florina Cercel
- Zephi Alșec
- Horia Căciulescu
- Dumitru Rucăreanu
- Ion Anghel – the robber sailor
- Nicolae Enache Praida
- Nucu Păunescu – captain Iani
- Marius Pepino – the merchant from Marseille
- Tudorel Popa – Adnana's father
- Arcadie Donos
- Aristide Teică
- Petre Gheorghiu-Goe
- Gheorghe Șimonca
- Dorin Dron – Slimbach
- Hristu Nicolaide
- Ștefan Moisescu
- N.N. Matei
- Marcel Gingulescu
- Ion Manolescu (II)

== Episodes ==
1. Speranța
2. Secretul epavei ("The Secret of the Shipwreck")
3. Bazarul deșertăciunilor și Omul negru ("The Vanity Bazaar and the Boogeyman")
4. Cine ești dumneata, domnule Vaillant? ("Who Are You, Mr. Vaillant?")
5. Cântecul sirenei ("The Siren Song")
6. Ancora împotmolită ("The Stranded Anchor")
7. Uraganul și paharul de apă ("The Hurricane and the Glass of Water")
8. O întâlnire ... sau chiar două ("A Meeting... or Even Two")
9. Martin Strickland intră in scenă ("Martin Strickland Enters the Stage")
10. Praf de aur ("Gold Dust")
11. La capătul lumii ("At the End of the World")
12. Aventura nu s-a sfârșit ("The Adventure Is Not Over")

== Production ==
The scenario for the series, based on Radu Tudoran's novel Toate pînzele sus! (1954), was written by Alexandru Struțeanu and Mircea Mureșan. The series was filmed in the Film Production Center studios in Bucharest; the producers benefited the support of the party and state organs from Constanța and Tulcea counties, and of the Ministries of Transport and Tourism. Shooting took place in the years 1975–1976.

The series was directed by Mircea Mureșan, helped by assistants directors Mariana Petculescu and Nicolae Corjos.

=== Production crew ===
- Nicu Stan – cinematography
- Nelly Merola – costumes
- Maria Neagu – film editing
- Radu Șerban – film score
- Marcel Bogos – set dresser
- Nicolae Ciolca – sound editing
