= Clara Vodă =

Romanian actress

- Born: 8 March 1970 (age 56); Constanța, Romania
- Occupation: Actress
- Years active: 1995-present

Clara Vodă (born 8 March 1970) is a Romanian actress. She appeared in more than twenty films since 1995.

== Selected filmography ==
Film
Year	Title	Role	Notes
2015	Pop-Up	Rada	
2014	Nightfall in India	Dana	
2012	Domestic	Doamna Lazar	
2011	Loverboy		
2010	If I Want to Whistle, I Whistle		
2010	Aurora	Gina	
1995	The Snails' Senator		
