= Loverboy (2011 film) =

2011 film

- Film poster
- Directed by: Cătălin Mitulescu
- Written by: Cătălin Mitulescu; Bogdan Mustata; Bianca Oana
- Produced by: Cătălin Mitulescu
- Starring: George Piștereanu
- Cinematography: Marius Panduru
- Music by: Pablo Malaurie
- Release dates: 19 May 2011 (Cannes); 7 October 2011 (Romania)
- Running time: 95 minutes
- Country: Romania
- Language: Romanian

Loverboy is a 2011 Romanian drama film directed by Cătălin Mitulescu. It premiered in the Un Certain Regard section at the 2011 Cannes Film Festival. The story is based on real events. It follows a young man who seduces women in order to bring them into a prostitution network.

== Cast ==
- George Piştereanu as Luca
- Ada Condeescu as Veli
- Ion Besoiu as Bunicul
- Clara Vodă as Doamna Savu
- Bogdan Dumitrache as Dumitrache
- Coca Bloos as Ramona
- Remus Mărgineanu as Toader
- Alexandru Mititelu as Zvori
- Adina Galupa as Dani
- Adrian Moroianu as Moritz
- Matei Onea as Matei
- Andrei Runcanu as Florin
- Veronica Neculai as Leti
- Robert Soare as Soare
- Pablo Malaurie as Aurica

== See also ==
- Romanian New Wave
