= Octavian Cotescu =

Romanian actor and director (1931–1985)

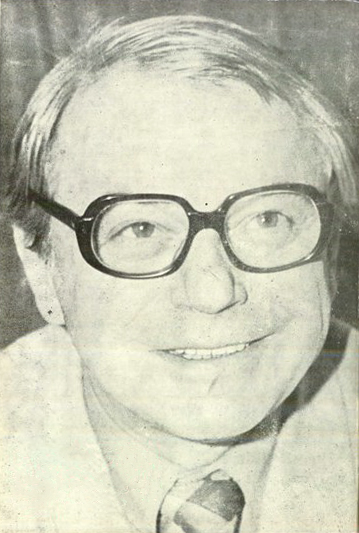
- Cotescu c. 1982
- Born: Octavian Coteț; 14 February 1931; Dorohoi, Kingdom of Romania
- Died: 22 August 1985 (aged 54); Sinaia, Socialist Republic of Romania
- Occupations: Actor; educator; stage director; politician
- Years active: 1945–1985
- Spouse: Valeria Seciu (m. 1966–1985)
- Children: 1
- Awards: 3rd prize at the Young Creators' Republican Awards (1959); Order of Cultural Merit (1967); Best Romanian Male Actor Award (1982); Lifetime Achievement Award of the Association of Theater and Music Artists (1985)

Member of the Great National Assembly
- In office March 1975 – 1981
- Constituency: Bucharest (Baba Novac)

Personal details
- Party: Front of Socialist Unity
- Other political affiliations: Workers' Youth (1950s)

Octavian Cotescu (born Octavian Coteț; 14 February 1931 – 22 August 1985) was a Romanian actor, stage director, and acting professor. Born into a working-class family in Dorohoi, he spent his childhood in various towns, traveling across the Romanian Kingdom. He settled in Iași as World War II was coming to an end, and began acting there as a young teenager; he entered the local drama conservatory, graduating at age nineteen. Cotescu had by then been in contact with the Romanian Communist Party's regional bodies, which established a Soviet-style republic in 1948. He was called up to a permanent employment at the Municipal (Bulandra) Theater in Bucharest. Though he had to be persuaded into leaving Iași, he remained a Bulandra actor for essentially the rest of his life. From 1960, he taught at the Caragiale Institute, serving as its rector in the 1980s.

Cotescu's development as an actor covered the late 1950s, still marked by adherence to the socialist-realist agenda, and the early 1960s, which witnessed a relative emancipation. Initially panned for his Bulandra shows, he built himself parallel careers as a voice actor with Electrecord (becoming especially loved as a children's reader) and as a regular presence on Romanian Television. His career took off in 1962, when he came into contact with playwright Teodor Mazilu. Alongside director Lucian Pintilie, they tested the vigilance of communist censors with Proștii sub clar de lună, which was eventually banned by an outraged party boss, Nicolae Ceaușescu. Cotescu still had separate collaborations with Mazilu and Pintilie, and was widely acclaimed for starring the latter's version of D-ale carnavalului (1967). He emerged as a favorite actor for Mazilu and another social satirist, Ion Băieșu, achieving an enduring, nation-level popularity, as Costel in Băieșu's sketch comedy series.

During the parallel consolidation of a Ceaușescu regime, Cotescu alternated compliance and acts of artistic rebellion—just as the regime itself veered between relative liberalism and repressive moods. With film and stage versions of Puterea și adevărul, he helped author Titus Popovici consolidate an early, still allegorical, variant of Ceaușescu's personality cult; during the 1970s, he also appeared in various roles, either positive or negative, which propagandized the regime's take on Marxist humanism. Cotescu himself was co-opted by the Front of Socialist Unity, serving one term (1975–1981) in the Great National Assembly. At the same time, he appeared in Pintilie's adaptation of the Government Inspector, which was banned for apparently mocking Ceaușescu, and dropped more subtle political hints in many of the comedies that used him—argued to have included his 1976 hit film, Operațiunea Monstrul.

Late in his career, Cotescu had critically well-reviewed roles at Teatrul Mic. He was in Thomas Bernhard's Minetti, and had twin roles in Cătălina Buzoianu's version of Master and Margarita. At Bulandra, he did Tartuffe and Bulgakov's Cabal of Hypocrites, both under Alexandru Tocilescu. His noted film roles of the 1980s were primarily in adaptations of Romanian literature classics, as with Mircea Mureșan's Blestemul pămîntului and Elisabeta Bostan's Fram series. Just before his death from a heart attack, Cotescu had returned to light-comedy films, as the father-in-law in Buletin de București, then as the eccentric artist in Sosesc păsările călătoare. He was outlived until 2022 by his wife and colleague, Valeria Seciu; their only child, Alexandru, became a monk on Mount Athos.

== Biography ==
=== Early life and debut ===
The actor's birth name was Octavian Coteț, but he disliked the name for sounding non-artistic, and had it changed (the form "Cotescu", suggested to him by director Moni Ghelerter, was officialized in mid-1966). He was from Dorohoi in Western Moldavia, born there on 14 February 1931; he lived on Gloriei Street, the same as two other future actors, siblings Rodica and Ștefan Tapalagă. His father Ilie Coteț was a State Railways employee, but hailed from a peasant family in Miroslava. He and his homemaking wife Maria (née Lazăr, from Botoșani), also had a younger daughter, Mioara. Octavian lived with his family in Iași from 1934, and began attending the National College in 1942, at the height of World War II. His parents divorced in 1943; at the time, Maria had begun working as a telegraphist, taking her children to Fratelia, outside Timișoara, while Ilie found employment in Câineni. In 1944, the boy enlisted at Timișoara Military School, but was immediately after transferred to another such institution in Pitești.

Coteț-Cotescu's early adolescence covered the last years of the Romanian Kingdom; increasingly after the anti-fascist coup of August 1944, the institutions were dominated by the Romanian Communist Party (PCR). In 1945, he returned to finish his secondary studies at the National College; he had become passionate about theater, and had joined a troupe patronaged by the PCR's Apărarea Patriotică formations—performing at various improvised locations, including Popovici Cinema, mess halls, and various city factories. In autumn 1946, still aged only fifteen, he entered Iași's drama conservatory, studying under Gina Sandri-Bulandra. A year later, the country became a communized republic. He graduated in 1950, with his final exam being a role in Lucia Demetrius' Cumpăna. Though qualifying for work in Bucharest, which was an option given to the best students, he was nonetheless disappointed, as he had hoped to support his mother as a local actor. Into his fifties, he regarded himself as a "child of Iași".

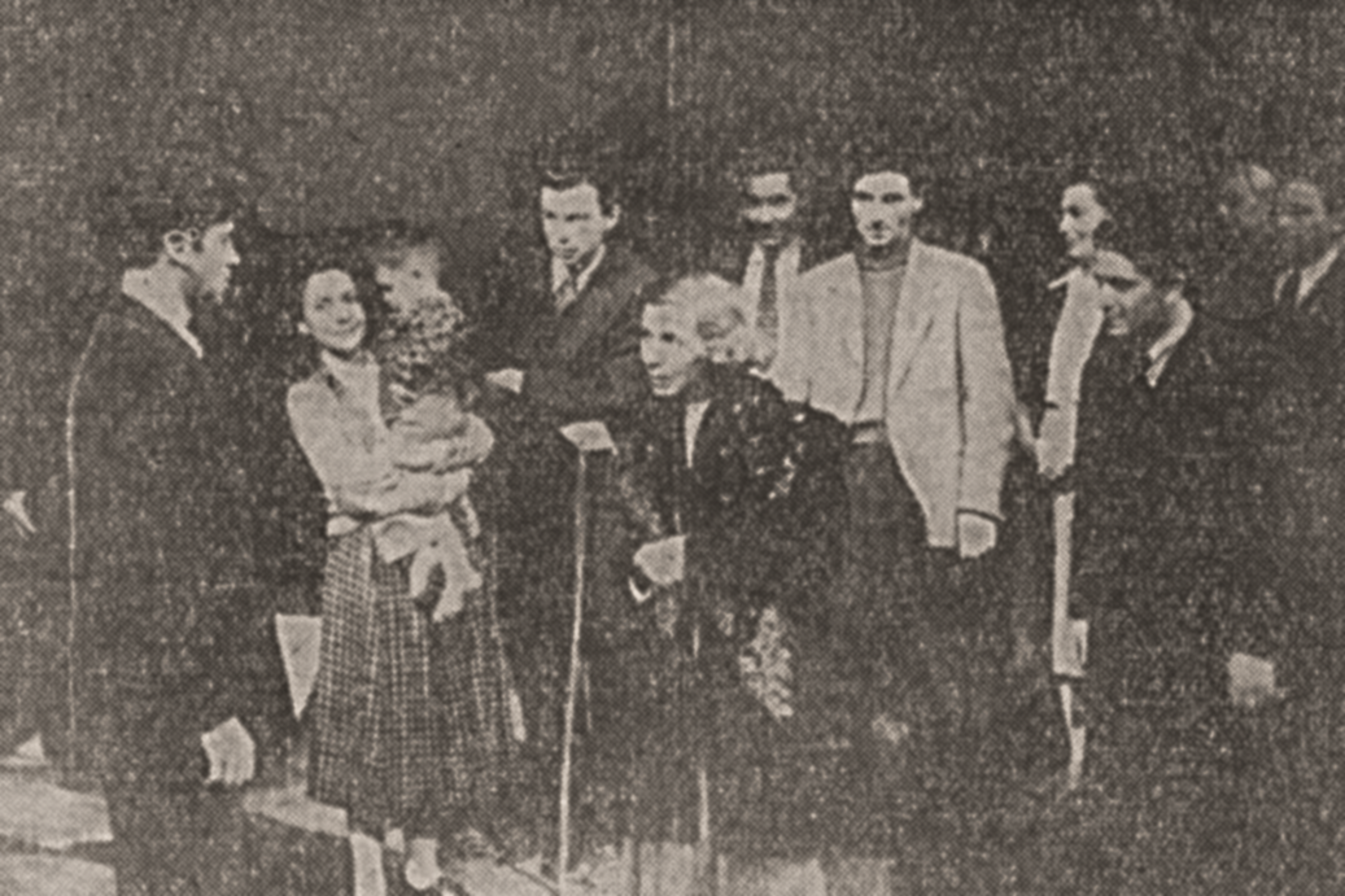
Rehearsal of the adapted Mitrea Cocor at the Municipal Theater, 1952. Cotescu (standing in the background, first on the left), alongside Benedict Dabija, Ileana Predescu, and Leny Caler

Cotescu was only persuaded into leaving the city after talks with his former professor, Ion Lascăr. He received his post at the Municipal (Bulandra) Theater, initially an extra in Demetrius' Vad nou. His official debut came in May 1951—with a production of Alexander Ostrovsky's Forest. Dramatist and critic Ecaterina Oproiu was pleasantly impressed by his Vosmibratov, played "with sensitivity and warmth". Later that year, he had his first collaboration with director Liviu Ciulei—as Kolosov, in Konstantin Trenyov's Lyubov Yarovaya. Early the next year, he was rehearsing with a stage adaptation of Mihail Sadoveanu's communist epos, Mitrea Cocor, in which he was assigned to play Lae Săracu. Sonia Filip, who had done the dramatization, referred to him as "young and talented".

His association with Demetrius' plays deepened in 1952, when he appeared in her Oameni de azi; in tandem, he was cast in Vassa Zheleznova (1953) and, as a Red Army soldier, in Aurel Baranga's Arcul de triumf (1954). His debut in Shakespearean comedy was also his first work as a voice actor: in 1953, he did a version of the Twelfth Night, which was produced and broadcast by the state radio company. As Cotescu himself acknowledged in a 1968 interview, his initial success wore off, and he spent several years "doing only small parts", "ranked the 31st in an actors' collective that was dominated by exigence as a principle." He rated himself as inferior in this respect to Radu Beligan (who "was Maestro Beligan from the very start"), but similar to Florin Piersic (the latter had evolved from "pretty beardless boy" to method actor after playing Lennie in Of Mice and Men).

=== 1950s flops and recovery ===
According to threatologist Adriana Boantă, Cotescu advanced his career, in part, by mimicking Beligan's embrace of communist rhetoric, which initially came with an endorsement of strict socialist-realism. Theater columnist Traian Șelmaru once described him as one of the favorite pupils of Lucia Sturdza-Bulandra, who was a doyen and leading lady of the Municipal ensemble. In October 1954, while she was chairwoman of the Municipal, he represented the actors' cell within the Workers' Youth; in this capacity, they co-signed a pledge to do propaganda work at collective farms in Periș and Livedea. Sturdza-Bulandra became his protector, getting him to act in productions where she took the leading role, and also helped him obtain approval for Maria and Mioara's relocation to Bucharest (1954). Octavian was tenured and salaried at Bulandra for the remainder of his career, only interrupting his apparitions there with stints at Teatrul Mic and some of the provincial venues.

During early 1957, Cotescu appeared as a background character in Take, Ianke și Cadîr, directed for Bulandra by N. Al. Toscani from a text by Victor Ion Popa. He received a guarded review from Vicu Mîndra of Gazeta Literară: "It cannot be said that the young actors: Graziela Albini (Ana) and Octavian Cotescu (Ionel) do not demonstrate certain qualities for the stage. But [...] neither of them managed to avoid clumsiness and notes that sounded false". In tandem, however, his portrayal of the schoolteacher in Sándor Bródy's A tanítónő was appreciated by Mihail Lupu of Scînteia, who remarked:

This young actor's leading merit, we believe, is the artistry of making his turmoils constantly felt—not so much through his lines as through his highly meaningful silences, through his sad and timid glances, his clumsy gestures, and his awkward, withdrawn demeanor, from which he rarely allows himself to step out. All these traits were brought to life with a sobriety that does the performer credit.

Cotescu was Valentine in a 1957 staging of You Never Can Tell—which was also his first role in a play by George Bernard Shaw. He was especially praised when portraying Bertrand de Poulengy in Shaw's Saint Joan—done by Ciulei in 1958, again at Bulandra. Later that year, Marietta Sadova used him in her version of The Cherry Orchard, by Anton Chekhov, in which he was Trofimov. Cotescu was also beginning his career as a coach and academic, initially by teaching courses as the People's School for the Arts. His debut on Romanian Television (TVR) came very early on the institution's history: in 1958, he was cast, alongside Mircea Albulescu and Victor Rebengiuc, in a televised version of Aurel Mihale's Casa de piatră. A rising demand for sketch comedy resulted in the approval of an anthology series, produced by Alexandru Tocilescu; Cotescu appeared therein as the 19th-century actor and satirist Matei Millo, reciting portions of Millo's texts. In January 1959, he was cast as Vasile Alecsandri in a special Bulandra show, created by Zoe Stanca and Puiu Hulubai for the centennial of the Little Union. By August, he was playing Andrei, a peasant who grows attached to the cause of socialism, in Demetrius' Vlaicu și feciorii lui.

Late in 1959, Cotescu took third prize at the Young Creators' Republican Awards, for his Ivushkin in Bread and Roses (from a text by Afanasi Salynsky). In 1960, he was again taken on by Ciulei, appearing with Rebengiuc in The Lower Depths. Also then, Dinu Negreanu directed him as Tom Wingfield in The Glass Menagerie, which was the last time he shared credits with Sturdza-Bulandra. For the following season, Ciulei did As You Like It, allowing Cotescu to have his full debut in Shakespearean plays. Cotescu was by then achieving recognition as a voice actor: in April 1957, he read out the children's fable, Ursulețul Mormăilă, for an LP by the state-owned label, Electrecord; in January 1959, did "The Gifts of the Little People", by the Brothers Grimm, as part of the children's evening segment on national radio. Also that year, his recitations of political poetry by Cicerone Theodorescu were featured on another LP, described by Viața Romînească magazine as one of the best Electrecord products up to that point. His Moldavian-pitched voice was widely seen as attractive, once described by journalist Annie Mănoiu as "gentle, clean and extremely nuanced."

=== With Pintilie and Mazilu ===
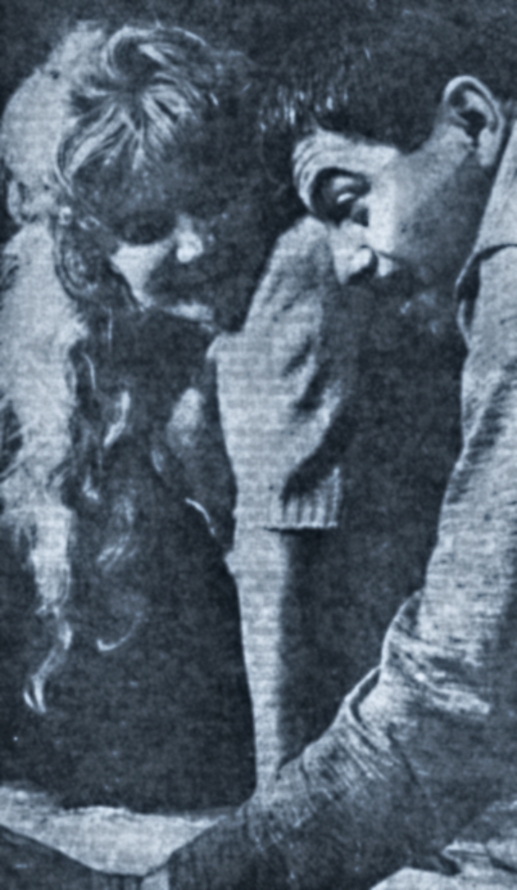
Cotescu and Rodica Tapalagă as Gogu and Ortansa in Teodor Mazilu's Proștii sub clar de lună (shortly before its decade-long ban)

Cotescu made his debut in film with a 1961 production, Portretul unui necunoscut, from a screenplay by his friend Dan Mihăescu. Mihăescu had tried out for the part, but had flunked; another one of the parts was played by Cotescu's schoolmate and companion, Petre Gheorghiu. He was meanwhile applauded by critic Margareta Bărbuță for his contribution to a Bulandra staging of Costache și viața interioară, from a text by Paul Everac. He played an effete engineer, and, according to Bărbuță, did so perfectly: "[his] sense of humor serves to point out, without ostentation, the actor's critical position towards the character. [...] With this role Octavian Cotescu confirms his artistic maturity." His second film credit came in 1963, when he starred opposite Albini in O dragoste lungă de-o seară, by Horea Popescu.

Also in 1962, Cotescu was directed by Lucian Pintilie in Proștii sub clar de lună. This was a debut play by the satirist Teodor Mazilu, who had been persuaded into writing it by Pintilie himself. The work was immediately controversial, and ended up irking the censorship apparatus. In the initial phases, they cut off a scene one in which the female protagonists commit suicide by throwing themselves into the orchestra pit. A high-ranking PCR cadre, Nicolae Ceaușescu, who reportedly attended the premiere, ended up agreeing with the negative assessments, and banned the play from being performed at Bulandra or elsewhere. Cotescu remained an admirer of Pintilie's, once informing him that "people call you our second Ciulei". Pintilie quipped: "And just who's the first one?"

The scandal occurred just shortly before Ceaușescu emerged as PCR general secretary, and subsequently as President of Romania. For almost two decades, Cotescu was closely, if separately, associated with both Pintilie and Mazilu. The former had him appear as several leads, including for Max Frisch's Fire Raisers and William Saroyan's My Heart's in the Highlands (both 1964). According to Șelmaru, Cotescu was also perfectly positioned to become the "anti-character" of Mazilu's comedies, and to understand Mazilian works as instruments for "dissect[ing] evil out of man and society". He fit well with "the over-hyperbolized style, both grotesque and realistic, of [Mazilu's] drama", and took it further, also applying it to plays by Ion Băieșu.

In tandem, Cotescu worked with Vlad Mugur on a staging of Alexandru Voitin's Portretul; he won praise from critic Vicu Mîndra for his portrayal of a disabused actor who is cheated on by his despairing wife (Ileana Predescu). He also had noted roles under Valeriu Moisescu's direction: in Baranga's Fii cuminte, Cristofor (1964), then in Ecaterina Oproiu's Nu sînt Turnul Eiffel (1966). The latter staging was one of several which cemented Oproiu's unusually great appeal with the masses. Semiotician Miruna Runcan, who calls attention to Nu sînt Turnul Eiffel as one of the most successful plays by a Romanian author, connects it to the counterculture of the 1960s.

In 1965, Cotescu had another credit as a voice actor, taping Man and His Mule, by George Ciprian, for Electrecord. He appeared at Teatrul Mic for one season, playing Harry in Luv, by Murray Schisgal, with Dinu Cernescu directing; he was also Edek in Tango, by Sławomir Mrożek, under Radu Penciulescu. According to critic Natalia Stancu, Mrożek was a badge of honor for the experimental company, and presented a challenge for trained realists such as Cotescu and Rebengiuc. One of their younger colleagues there was George Constantin, who recalled of Cotescu and other seniors: "besides the fact that they were great actors, they were also total cannibals: if you weren't careful, you'd find yourself ground to pieces! The stage itself had become a terrific battleground".

=== As Girimea and Costel ===
From 1960, Cotescu had been assistant professor for A. Pop Marțian's class at the Caragiale Institute of Theater and Film Arts (IATC). In 1964–1966, his students, whom he directed in another take on As You Like It, included Ion Caramitru, Ovidiu Iuliu Moldovan, Florina Cercel, Mariana Mihuț, Rodica Mandache, Virgil Ogășanu, and Valeria Seciu. He became romantically involved with the latter, at the same time as his close friend Rebengiuc was courting Mihuț; the couples double-dated for a while. Both Rebengiuc and Cotescu ended up marrying their respective dates. In 1968, Octavian and Valeria had a son, Alexandru.

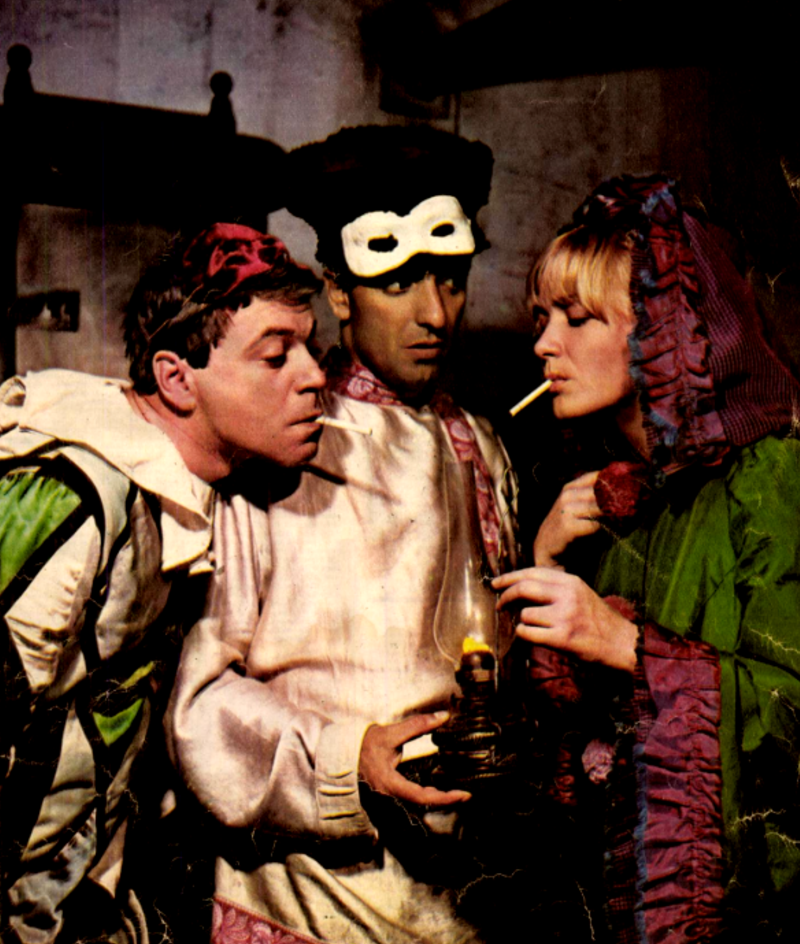
Scene from D-ale carnavalului, with Cotescu (as Girimea) and Tapalagă (Didina Mazu) flanking Ștefan Bănică (Iordache)

Cotescu returned to the big screen in Diminețile unui băiat cuminte, a social-problem project done by Andrei Blaier in early 1967. As observed by critic Călin Căliman, he had genuine skill in rendering "a self-absorbed man for whom life seems to offer no more surprises", but who erupts with violence toward the end of the film. At Bulandra, again under Pintilie's direction, he was Nae Girimea in D-ale carnavalului, a comedy by the Romanian classic Ion Luca Caragiale. Here, he shared the stage with Toma Caragiu, Ștefan Bănică, and Marin Moraru (the latter was sometimes replaced by Grigore Vasiliu Birlic). The casting choice was met with pleasure by poet and scholar Romulus Vulpescu, who found it to be an "essential contribution to the show's success":

[Cotescu does Girimea as] the essentially nonchalant swindler, the detached suburban scoundrel, slow in action, contemptuous of agitation, [...] escaping with a clean face from any real danger he faces, and of which he is supremely ignorant. He is almost a "gentleman", this seducer from the periphery, a benign consumer of sensitive female hearts, seemingly unconcerned about catastrophes [...].

The play was a major hit—with critic Valentin Dumitrescu recalling that "adolescents of that era would huddle up like sardines in the [Bulandra] hall at Izvor". Cotescu and the rest of the cast took it on tour, both in the Soviet Union and throughout Western Europe. With Ciulei as director, Cotescu was the lead in Voitin's staged adaptation of the Horea trial (1967), seen by reviewers as a generally convincing reconstruction, largely due to his efforts. He also returned as the title character in Ciulei's 1968 version of Macbeth. He then redid Trofimov in Pintilie's own Cherry Orchard, premiered that same year. At the TVR, Cotescu and Seciu appeared together in a 1967 production of Surorile Boga, done from a text by Horia Lovinescu.

Cotescu achieved national recognition during the 1966–1973 interval, when he starred, alongside Coca Andronescu, in the sketch comedy acts known collectively as Tanța și Costel—or, more formally, as Iubirea e un lucru foarte mare. Done by Titi Acs from Băieșu's scripts, they were aired at regular intervals on TVR, as part of the Sunday slot. Such breakthroughs also had a downside, underscored thirty years later by writer Aurel Leon—who observed that Costel "nearly crushed" Cotescu's artistic reputation. According to one report, Cotescu's appearances in tragedies were interrupted by spectators shouting: "That's Costel over there!" In a May 1967 piece, journalist Radu Cosașu pleaded with the television company to end production of Iubirea e un lucru foarte mare, suggesting that there was already "nowhere else to go" with its "sterile" plot devices. Early the next year, literary columnist George Pruteanu contrarily panned Băieșu's book of Tanța și Costel stories, arguing that the two characters only lived through Cotescu and Andronescu.

While achieving notoriety for comedic acts, Cotescu also advanced academically. From 1967, he was IATC junior lecturer, also receiving the Meritul Cultural decoration, third class, "for outstanding merit in works of drama". He achieved seniority in 1970, earning a full professorship in 1977. The 1968 comedy film, Balul de sîmbătă seara, done from a text by Dumitru Radu Popescu, marked the first collaboration between Cotescu and director Geo Saizescu. His successes as a voice actor included Poveste pînă la 5 ("A Story That Goes Up to Five"), written by Vasile Mănuceanu as a counting aid for young children, and released as an LP by Electrecord. It won a special prize at the NHK educational awards in 1968.

=== Puterea și adevărul ===
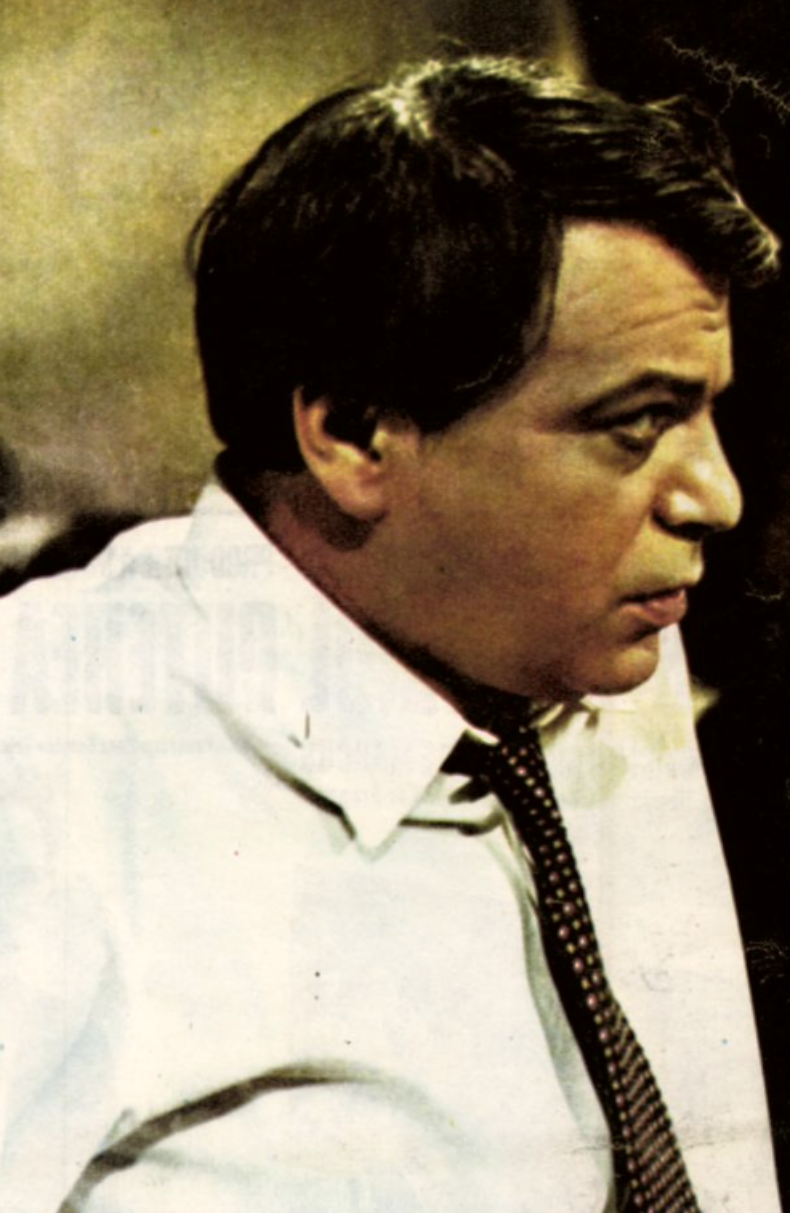
Cotescu as Manu in the film version of Puterea și adevărul (1971)

After a years-long absence as a playwright, imposed on him by ongoing censorship, Mazilu returned with Tandrețe și abjecție, which was directed at Bulandra by Cornel Todea (1969). Cotescu had five different roles in that production, and took it on tour in West Germany. His contribution on that project enthused his mentor Beligan: "I was amazed, stunned, driven crazy by Cotescu. [...] I now found him perfectly in control of his means, an intelligent actor, full of sensitivity, nuance, discretion, and subtle irony." Mazilu's other work, Acești nebuni fățarnici, was directed by Emil Mandric in a 1970 production; Cotescu won acclaim as one of the leads, Iordache. He and his co-star Florian Pittiș where also being paired in William Congreve's classic, Love for Love, with Cotescu as Tattle. Cotescu was present in the 1969 war film Castelul condamnaților, seconding Rebengiuc. On television, he and Stela Popescu did L'Affaire de la rue de Lourcine, by Eugène Labiche, in an offbeat version directed by Octavian Sava—and airing on 1 August 1970.

During 1971, Manole Marcus filmed Titus Popovici's political drama, Puterea și adevărul, welcomed by Căliman as the most important film made up to that point in Romania. Cotescu was Manu, a PCR cadre who drops from revolutionary, heroic, beginnings into a life of complacency and cowardice, which make him an obstacle to party unity. Popovici himself once credited Cotescu with having pushed for Manu to be rewritten as more believable, and stated that the actor's notes went into the definitive text. As argued by Căliman, Cotescu avoided the temptation of doing Manu as a grotesque being, and instead "offers viewers a tragic example of non-adherence to the lines of development in our Contemporary Society." Returning to the film in 1994, after the lifting of censorship, the same critic commended Marcus' effort. In Căliman's reading, Marcus had taken a political command and remade it into an "obvious" statement about the killing of a factional leader, Lucrețiu Pătrășcanu, by his enemies inside the party.

Puterea și adevărul was immediately rejected by the anti-communist playwright Ion Dezideriu Sîrbu, who suggested in his diary that the text was "written by a bigwig, about the bigwigs, for the bigwigs", and that its purpose was to "obscure the truth". The film has historical significance for documenting Ceaușescu's then-liberalizing tendencies, which came with a critical look at his deceased predecessor, Gheorghe Gheorghiu-Dej. In a 1999 overview, literary critic Gheorghe Grigurcu addresses the film as "ordered 'from above'", and rebellious only "with police approval". He includes Puterea și adevărul within a set of artistic works that were meant to showcase Ceaușescu as a Marxist humanist. Historian Bogdan Jitea likewise notes that the Pătrășcanu connection was actually encouraged by the authorities, and that Ceaușescu personally vetted Popovici's message.

In 1972, Cotescu worked with Popovici and Sergiu Nicolaescu on a war film called Then I Sentenced Them All to Death. His role was as a member of the village elite, who tries to save itself by sacrificing a social marginal (played by Amza Pellea); according to critic Eva Sîrbu, he made his character look "brilliantly obtuse", in an overall "vibrant and subtle" effort. Throughout the interval, Cotescu was active at Electrecord, which in 1971–1972 put out Movila lui Burcel, a historical narrative by Mănuceanu (in which he had a speaking role alongside Colea Răutu), as well as his reading of "The Little Match Girl" (by Hans Christian Andersen).

=== Gogolian clampdown and Bariera years ===
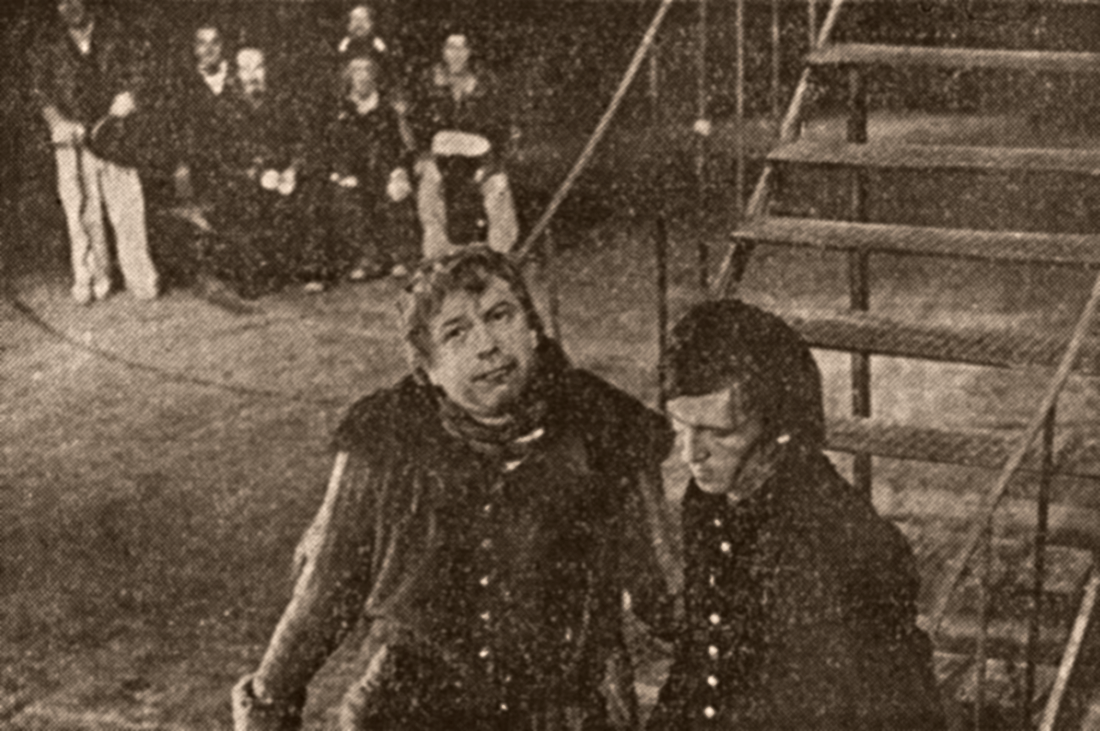
Cotescu and Virgil Ogășanu in one of the few surviving photographs from 1972's Government Inspector

Also in 1972, Pintilie had another run-in with the communist censors: his version of Nikolai Gogol's Government Inspector, with Cotescu as one of the main actors, was banned by the regime after only three shows. Other actors were reportedly told that this was after Ceaușescu had recognized himself in the on-stage caricatures. In the aftermath, Ciulei was sacked from his position as Bulandra manager by a special panel of the PCR; according to Cernescu, this clampdown inaugurated a terminal decline at the institution. Despite this measure, Ciulei was maintained as a stage director. He and his favorite actors resumed their collaboration on another Caragialesque text, O scrisoare pierdută; Cotescu won recognition as the professional demagogue, Nae Cațavencu.

Cotescu's filmography for 1972 included Bariera, done by Mircea Mureșan from one of Mazilu's novels-turned-screenplays. His role was as the lead, Vițu, described in the press of that year as sampling the communist "new man". Mureșan himself noted having taken a risk with such casting, since the strong association between author and character could make the entire project appear formulaic. The creative trio earned attention from critics of the say with its fresh take on communist storytelling—Vițu was a worker and an organizer of the wartime resistance movement. Ștefan Oprea of Cronica described his interpretation as "exceptional", adding: "Only he could so naturally blend wit and humor into the seriousness of the character, only he could give such elegant discretion to the sacrifice the hero chooses instead of betrayal." Similarly, Alice Mănoiu of Cinema mentioned Bariera as the only war-themed production in which communist fighters use humor against their enemies and captors.

Cotescu was again called upon by Ciulei for a 1973 on-stage reprisal of Puterea și adevărul. According to historian Adrian Cioroianu, this version became a success with the public, because it emphasized the Pătrășcanu affair (a topic of general curiosity), but was also implicitly about Ceaușescu as a "more dynamic, and in any case pure" type of communist leader. Cioroianu sees Ciulei's Puterea și adevărul as an early "brick" in constructing Ceaușescu's cult of personality. As Boantă argues, Cotescu, like Nicolaescu and Pellea, became a full participant in that cult, with "a servile attitude, sometimes bordering on delusion."

Also in 1973, Cotescu reunited with Moisescu and Caragiu for Theodor Mănescu's play, Casa de mode, in which he was an affable Securitate officer. He had been promised a lead role as Nicolae Bălcescu in a TV miniseries by Petre Sava Băleanu, and was being considered as schoolteacher Herdelea in Mureșan's new film (adapted from Liviu Rebreanu's novel, Ion). He announced that he was working with Mazilu on another film project, called Iaurtul și restul lumii, and also that he had wrapped up filming on Saizescu's adaptation of the Păcală folk stories. In the latter, he was The Tax Collector, describing himself as one from "the gallery of caricatures whose limitations of conception and mindset are ridiculed by [...] folk wisdom". His television work included a show based on Caragiale's Momente și schițe series, sharing credits with Dem Rădulescu as one of two witless "chums", with interchangeable names.

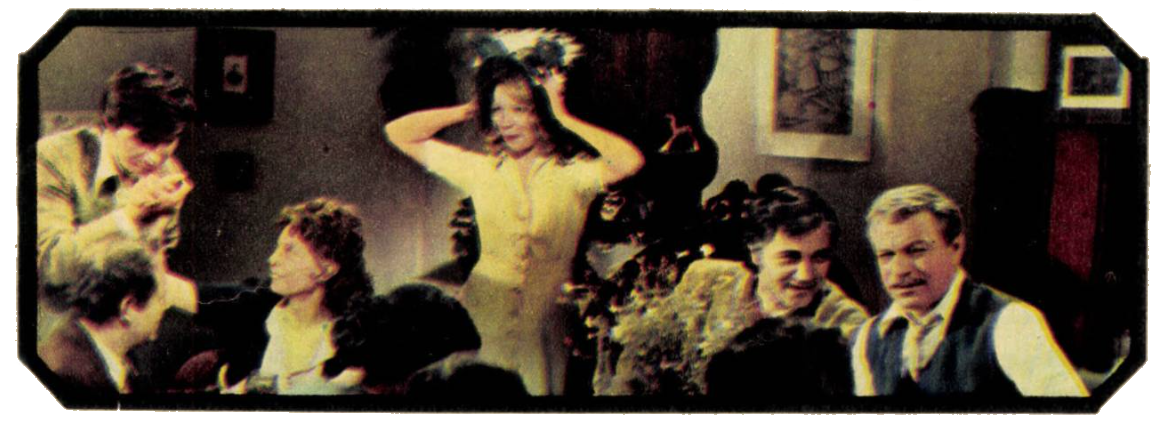
Scene from Mircea Mureșan's Bariera, with Cotescu on the right

=== Capcana and Operațiunea Monstrul ===
At the beginning of 1974, Cotescu appeared in Proprietarii, filmed and written by Șerban Creangă. He was one of the unprincipled characters, who egotistical intrusions are depicted as hindering the socialist mode of production. He was simultaneously cast, alongside Rebengiuc and Mircea Albulescu, in Marcus' Capcana. The project was revisited in 2006 by critic Cezar Paul-Bădescu, who noted that it was meant to glorify Securitate agents as "good guys", who defend regular folk from inhumane anti-communist partisans; the latter are depicted not just as murdering civilians, but also as "kill[ing] animals in the forest and then hav[ing] sex alongside the carcasses". Cotescu was the village Gendarme, and was praised by Căliman, on the original release, as one of Capcana's better characters. According to Bădescu, the role was entirely ideologized, serving to mock the old-regime National Liberal Party—whom the Gendarme represented locally.

Also in 1974, Cotescu appeared in the multi-directorial TV minisieries, Un august în flăcări, which honored the 30th anniversary of the Romanian anti-fascist coup. Alexandru Tatos employed him for a stage production of Băieșu's comedy, Chițimia. On the radio, he did Shylock, from The Merchant of Venice, using Gala Galaction's version. His voice acting focused for a while on children's literature. In mid-1975, Electrecord released an LP of the Greuceanu fairy tale, as retold by Călin Gruia, and with Cotescu narrating. Around the same time, he also did voice work on Ion Pas' Familia Chiț-Chiț. He had begun another collaboration, with director Cătălina Buzoianu. She used him in a 1975 Hedda Gabler, and (with Gina Patrichi) in a 1976 premiere of Oproiu's Interviu. On film, Cotescu was the unseen narrator in Mircea Moldovan's 1975 comedy, Toamna bobocilor, and then in its 1977 sequel; as well as Miliția officer Vigu, seen by critics as one of the few strengths of an otherwise unremarkable police procedural, Cercul magic (completed by Corneliu Leu in 1975). He was additionally one of 104 local celebrities who had cameos in Tufă de Veneția, by the debuting filmmaker Petre Bokor (with Valentin Silvestru as the author of the sketches integrated as a screenplay). According to Ștefan Oprea, it is one only four or five feature-length comedy projects that were "at an honorable artistic level", for the entire 1970–1980 interval.

At an official level, Cotescu rallied with the Ceaușescu regime before single-list legislative elections in March 1975, joining the Front of Socialist Unity as a regime candidate. In his election manifesto, he called for total mobilization in support of the PCR, adding: "As an artist-citizen, I benefit today from the privileged presence of artists on the candidate lists, which was conceived of as a function of harmonious spiritual development, as promoted by our [communist] party." Running in the Baba Novac area of Bucharest, alongside the PCR's own Radu Beligan, he went on to serve a full term in the Great National Assembly, to 1981. His IATC student, Radu Gheorghe, argued in a 2008 interview that his teacher was only formally a communist, and that all political education was done in specialized classes; similarly, director Gelu Colceag described the IATC as an "oasis" of liberated thought, and suggested that Cotescu was only performing services so that he could receive "money for the Institute".

In his film career, Cotescu was again used by Marcus, this time for the 1976 absurdist comedy Operațiunea Monstrul. It was a major box-office hit, and, according to Căliman, offered some discreet mockery of the regime. Ion Lazăr of Luceafărul observed that the film was entirely carried by Cotescu, Caragiu, and Marin Moraru: "Although they do not support roles commensurate with their talent, the three aces of comedy lavish their inventiveness and acting skills." On his own, Cotescu did Bunicul și doi delincvenți minori, written by Petre Sălcudeanu. Here, he was a wise and kind Miliția officer, who helps two streetwise urchins find their way in life. Towards the end of that same year, Cotescu seconded Caragiu in Carol Corfanta's Serenadă pentru etajul XII, which was a lighthearted cinematic ode to urban systematization, and as such propagandized for the regime. The film was panned by contemporaries such as Căliman, who was puzzled by the attribution of roles—Cotescu was "a manic university professor, who goes out with a rifle to meet the 'invaders' of various professions when they ring his doorbell."

Another Caragiu–Cotescu on-screen pairing was the 1977 Gloria nu cîntă, in which the latter of two also did a dance number. He was simultaneously cast as an unwavering bureaucrat in a 1977 film project, Iarba verde de acasă, with Stere Gulea directing. His final play under Moisescu's direction was Alexander Vampilov's Provincial Anecdotes (also in 1977). By 1978, he had returned to Teatrul Mic, where Laurențiu Azimioară was producing Uncle Vanya (also reuniting Cotescu with Rodica Tapalagă). Film credits for that year included Saizescu and Temistocle Popa's popular musical comedy, Eu, tu și Ovidiu—though he was on screen for only a few seconds, in what was another unusually large ensemble cast. Also that year, he appeared in the Aurel Vlaicu biopic, done by Mircea Drăgan. Here, he played Alexandru Vlahuță, the poet and political activist.

=== Peak: Minetti and Pilate ===
During late 1978, Cotescu and his assistant Ovidiu Schumacher directed their IATC class in a rendition of Valentin Kataev's comedy play, Squaring the Circle. According to critic Valeria Duncea, the show flopped, with the only highlight being a young Răzvan Vasilescu as Flavius. Ciulei's new adaptation of O scrisoare pierdută, done in 1979 at Bulandra, paired Cotescu with Rebengiuc and Mihuț. They toured with it in the United States, with shows at La MaMa and Yale Repertory Theatre. From 1979, one of Cotescu's major stage roles was as the titular character in Thomas Bernhard's Minetti. This version, seen by reviewers as one of the most valuable shows of that interval, was directed by Anca Ovanez Doroșenco at Teatrul Mic. Critic Marina Constantinescu, at the time still a young student, recalls being overwhelmed with emotion at seeing Cotescu act with "his massive body, his heavy movements, his eyes troubled by the torment of Minetti, an old, forgotten actor who walks around with the mask of Lear and all his obsessions, all his dreams, all his accomplishments, desires, expectations, and failures".

Constantin Vaeni directed Cotescu in the 1979 film Vacanță tragică, loosely based on several stories by Mihail Sadoveanu. Here, he was a democratically-minded bourgeois, forced to deal with a peasant uprising. The following year, Cotescu was again at Teatrul Mic, with a nationally celebrated adaptation of Mikhail Bulgakov's novel, Master and Margarita—done by Buzoianu and Mihaela Tonitza Iordache, with Seciu as Margarita. In her 2014 piece, Natalia Stancu describes it as one of several "life-changing shows" at Teatrul Mic, adding that the original audience "resonated to [Bulgakov's] truth that 'manuscripts don't burn'". Censorship norms were also tested by Seciu, who appeared topless in one scene. As observed by actor Marcel Iureș, this was a singular exception in the history of Ceaușescu-era theater, occurring at a time when her husband was still in the communist legislature.

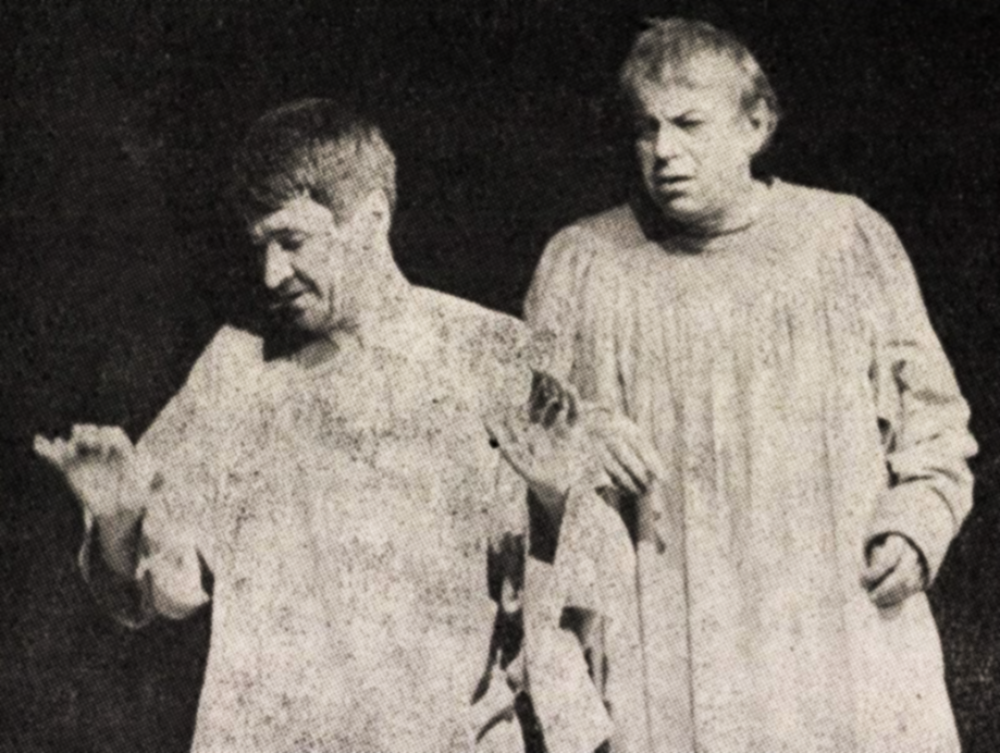
Ștefan Iordache (Jesus) and Cotescu (Pontius Pilate) in Master and Margarita (November 1980)

Master and Margarita was lauded by columnists of the day as a must-see. Aurel Bădescu was impressed by Cotescu's dual rule as a "chillingly compose[d] Pontius Pilate, ravaged by a profound sense of guilt", and as "a Professor Stravinsky, with his perverse smile." Mircea Zaciu similarly credited his "ferocious–naive duplicity" in the twin parts, while suggesting that Buzoianu's show "can aspire [...] to real competitiveness at a worldwide scale." Chronicling the show for Ramuri, Doina Modola dwelled on the synchronization between Pilate and Jesus, who was played by Ștefan Iordache:

This magnetic actor [Iordache] fills an all-too-small stage, which is already overpopulated. He does so in lockstep with Pilate—Octavian Cotescu, who is unctuous, stiff, his eyes oozing with suffering, with slyness, with chronic and useless diplomacy, with animalistic, undignified fear, with mystical distrust of everything [...]—creating one of those valuable encounters in which the parties seek to cancel each other out.

Cotescu had another success as a voice actor when he and Seciu were both in a radioplay, done from Eugeniu Botez's Europolis and aired in February 1980 by the state company. His participation in adaptations of literary classics was also taken to the realm of film, in several 1980 projects. One was a version of Bietul Ioanide—from a novel by George Călinescu, adapted by Eugen Barbu, and with Dan Pița directing. He was cast therein as Pomponescu, one of the caricatures whereby Călinescu had expressed his contempt for the interwar intelligentsia. Cotescu finally appeared as Herdelea in Blestemul pămîntului, blestemul iubirii, filmed by Mureșan and Popovici from Rebreanu's epic. This role immediately described by Oproiu as an absolute peak of his film-work. In a contrasting chronicle, Ion Parhon opined that both he and Seciu (who had appeared as Savista) had not been allowed to give their best.

=== Marcelloni and Tartuffe ===
Yet another literary adaptation was Înghițitorul de săbii, filmed by Alexa Visarion from stories by Alexandru Sahia; Cotescu had a noted cameo. Exploring the realm of children's movies, he starred with Adrian Vîlcu and Carmen Galin in Saltimbancii (1981) and Un saltimbanc la Polul Nord. These were adapted from Fram, ursul polar, by Cezar Petrescu, with Elisabeta Bostan directing; they were later also cut into a TV series, Fram. In all of the productions, Cotescu was Cezar Marcelloni, doomed leader of a circus family. Saltimbancii in particular impressed the senior film critic D. I. Suchianu:

Octavian Cotescu plays an old and stiff circus performer, terribly proud of his refined quality, that of "being funny". [...] Twice during the film he has tirades in which he reprimands and scolds those who allow themselves the impudence and foolishness to look with insulting contempt at the "funny ones", namely at those whose very craft and destiny are to make man more... human.

Between 1981 and 1985, Cotescu was rector of the IATC. In June 1982, he contributed a political article for România Liberă daily, indicating that his work at the Institute had a "pronounced ideological nature", and assuring the PCR that he was "channeling [the educational process] into a framing of strong ideological, ethical, humanistic resonances." Mazilu's death in late 1980 was marked in several ways by him and his students: in 1982, he directed them in staging the late writer's Acești nebuni fățarnici; Cotescu likewise organized a Mazilu Symposium, with authors Dumitru Solomon and Radu Cosașu among the guest speakers.

Also in 1982, at Bulandra, Alexandru Tocilescu directed Cotescu in two celebrated, and interrelated, productions: Tartuffe and Bulgakov's Cabal of Hypocrites. These twin shows earned him the annual national award for best male actor. Critic Ileana Lucaciu noted that he outdid himself, with new takes on each main role: he was an intelligent Tartuffe, whose "dangerous structure" is causally ignored by a plethora of imbecilic victims; in tandem, he did Molière as a man of "tragic defects [and] tragic guilts". Cotescu's Molière also impressed writer Zsolt Gálfalvi as "psychologically authentic and expressive piece of acting", alternating "smiling weakness [and] selfishness" with moments of human greatness. He reserved praise for the "almost frenzied outburst" in which Molière seeks to protect his artistic liberties against the whims of Louis XIV (embodied by an "outstanding" Florian Pittiș).

Băieșu reports that, by that moment, Cotescu was acting on stage despite being increasingly ill and having "dizzy spells". He once checked himself into hospital, but "without telling anyone." Cotescu also worked with director Virgil Calotescu and writer Francisc Munteanu on the 1983 comedy film, Buletin de București; well-liked by moviegoers, it showcased him and Draga Olteanu Matei as two fumbling parents, unaware that their daughter's marriage is one of convenience. In April, he was jury president at the Students' Humor Festival of Iași (part of Cîntarea României), where he awarded a top prize to the absurdist comedy group Divertis. The latter's act was scrutinized by regime censors, which cut out any references that could be understood as being about the Ceaușescu family. At the time, Cotescu had been cast in O lebădă iarna, from a screenplay by Paul Everac. It was officially advertised as a communist retelling of themes found in Mihail Sebastian's classic-existential play, The Star Without a Name. Directed by Mureșan, it was officially launched at the film festival of Costinești, in August 1983.

=== Final activities and death ===
Cotescu's career, including his Tocilescu shows, had gone on hiatus in June 1983—when he was hospitalized for heart issues at Fundeni, this time with a public notice. In January 1984, national television aired Sorana Coroamă-Stanca's production of a Caragiale comedy, the Stormy Night. Costescu was the bourgeois family-man, Dumitrache, while Seciu appeared as his adventurous wife, Veta. Reviewers panned aspects of this version: Constantin Radu-Maria was unpleasantly surprised by the "clown-like" Horațiu Mălăele, who appeared therein as Venturiano; however, he enjoyed Cotescu's "enormous buffoonery", which he saw as artful. At Scînteia Tineretului, Cleopatra Lorințiu agreed that the production was problematic, but also commended the other actors—and especially the interplay between Dumitrache and his subdued acolyte, Ipingescu (Mitică Popescu). In a 2017 review, Constantin Paraschivescu demanded leniency, praising Cotescu for his "uncommon nuance". Rather than entirely self-absorbed, his Dumitrache appeared genuinely hurt by hints that Veta was cheating on him.

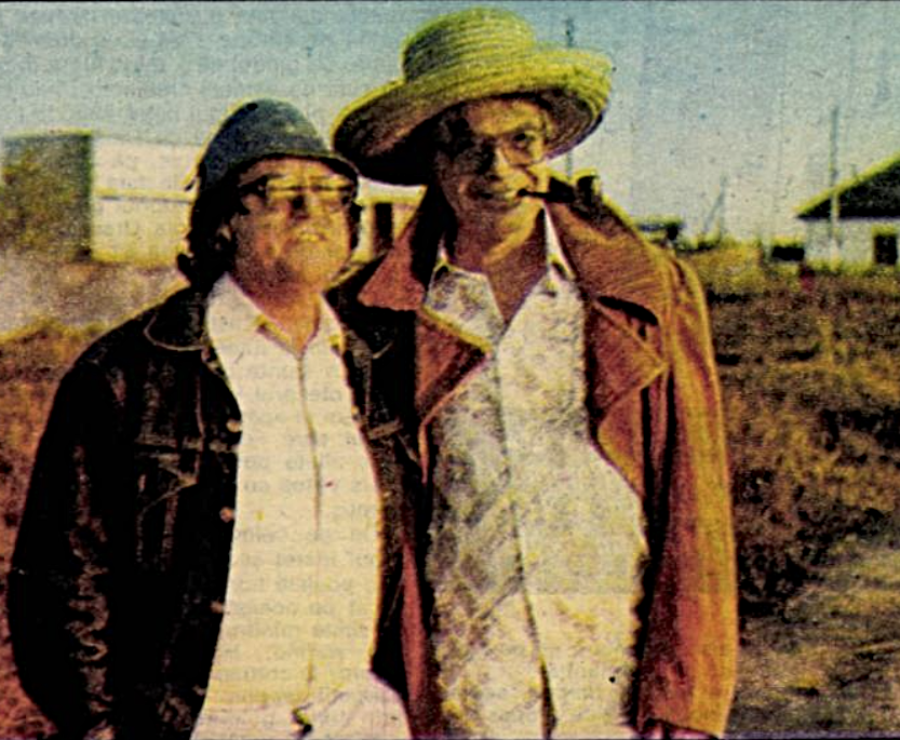
Cotescu and Geo Saizescu in the Danube Delta, filming on Sosesc păsările călătoare (1984)

At the time, the actor was mainly performing at the Oradea State Theater. The show was Samuil Alyoshin's Eighteenth Camel, as directed by Victor Ioan Frunză. Some of Cotescu's final film credits include Al. G. Croitoru's rural comedy, Miezul fierbinte al pîinii (released January 1984), and Prea cald pentru luna mai—directed by Maria Callas-Dinescu from a text by Petre Sălcudeanu, and showing his as the loving but overbearing father of an idealistic boy (played by Vîlcu, his Saltimbancii co-star). Another Cotescu film, released in 1984, was Tudor Mărăscu's youth drama, called Singur de cart. Among the period reviewers of the day, Zeno Fodor opined that Cotescu's was a "dime-a-dozen bit part" with no justification.

Saizescu directed him in a social satire, The Secret of Bacchus, from a script by Popovici. Here, Cotescu appeared as a cowardly and opportunistic editor who prevents a principled journalist (played by Emil Hossu) from exposing a contraband ring. He spent part of the year filming with Saizescu in the Danube Delta; the project was another comedy, Sosesc păsările călătoare, for which they used a script by Fănuș Neagu. Cotescu was cast as an eccentric painter, seen by Saizescu himself as "the link with all my other movies."

Cotescu inaugurated the 1984–1985 Bulandra season with Popovici's Passacaglia, as produced by Mircea Cornișteanu. The work was specifically selected because of its political content, serving to mark the ruby jubilee of the anti-fascist coup. Also then, he earned attention for his secondary part in the original Star Without a Name, filmed for TVR by Eugen Todoran. Later in 1985, the Association of Theater and Music Artists granted Cotescu its Lifetime Achievement Award. In June, he and Saizescu were promoting Sosesc păsările călătoare at Botoșani. This reportedly gave Cotescu great joy, as he was able to revisit areas tied to his childhood, and of which "he knew every hill". He told Saizescu that the setting would have been good for filming another comedy, using one of Băieșu's stories as a starting point. Such projects were interrupted when he died of a heart attack in Sinaia on 22 August 1985.

== Legacy ==
It was initially announced that Cotescu would be buried at Bellu cemetery at noon on 27 August. He was instead laid in state at Bulandra, that evening. This ceremony was attended by, among others, poet Ana Blandiana. She recalled the ceremony as a final Cotescu show, or a "happening directed by destiny itself", with students overcome with sadness and "great names of our stage" serving as honor guards. The funeral was ultimately at Bellu, where a one-year commemoration was held in August 1986. Calotescu's film Căsătorie cu repetiție, a sequel to Buletin, was released between these dates, and was described by Căliman as Cotescu's last on-screen performance. Such early records were amended in mid-1986, when Șerban Creangă completed post-production on his Clipa de răgaz. Cotescu appeared therein, but not with full credits, as his voice had been overdubbed. Creangă's project, dealing with industrial relations, opened to mixed reviews—though Cotescu was commended, the narrative was seen as unengaging. Posthumous releases also include the 1986 record version of another fairy tale, Harap-Alb.

In a 1990 interview, George Constantin listed Cotescu as one of the actors who, "however great they were", were still poor and in debt at the time of their death. Shortly after the Romanian Revolution of 1989, a string of unexplained fires at the IATC led to an urban legend that Cotescu's ghost had returned and was trying to destroy the building. These rumors, jocularly encouraged by professors such as Adrian Pintea, were put to rest when the actual arsonist was caught. Cotescu's widow Valeria continued her career before and after the revolution, becoming manager of Levant Theater, and working until her death in 2022. The couple's son, Alexandru, was training as an engineer at the Bucharest Polytechnic in 1988. He later took orders in the Romanian Orthodox Church, changing his name to "Daniil", and lived in seclusion on Mount Athos—where he translated The Evergetinos into Romanian.

Octavian Cotescu's work in children's entertainment, part of which was released as an audiobook collection in 2024, is memorialized by Palatul Copiilor concert-hall, which has one of its halls named in his honor. He was also commemorated in a 1993 monograph, issued by Ileana Berlogea and Ion Toboșaru through Editura Meridiane. Despite Tanța și Costel's great popularity as a proto-sitcom, only four full episodes had survived by 2006, when they were reissued as a DVD. In 2008, Mălăele, who had been one of Cotescu's students as well as his on-screen colleague, released the comedy-drama Silent Wedding, which narrated events related to the Soviet occupation of Romania. As the director revealed at the time, the plot had been developed from stories that Cotescu told in private to his class at the IATC. In 2013, Cotescu's name was inscribed on a monument erected near the Bucharest Walk of Fame.
