= Poppy Field (film) =

2020 Romanian LGBTQ+ romantic drama film

- Theatrical film poster
- Romanian: Câmp de maci
- Directed by: Eugen Jebeleanu
- Written by: Ioana Moraru
- Produced by: Velvet Moraru
- Starring: Conrad Mericoffer; Alexandru Potocean
- Cinematography: Marius Panduru
- Edited by: Catalin Cristutiu
- Release dates: November 15, 2020 (Tallinn); September 17, 2021 (Romania)
- Running time: 81 minutes
- Country: Romania
- Languages: Romanian; English; Arabic; French

Poppy Field (Romanian: Câmp de maci) is a 2020 Romanian LGBTQ+ romantic drama film, directed by Eugen Jebeleanu. The film stars Conrad Mericoffer and Alexandru Potocean. It premiered at the Tallinn Black Nights Film Festival in Estonia in 2020, before being released throughout Romania the following year.

== Synopsis ==
A young police officer, Cristi, tries to find the balance between two opposing parts of his identity: that of a man working in a macho hierarchical environment and that of a closeted gay person who tries to keep his personal life a secret.

== Cast ==
- Conrad Mericoffer as Cristi
- Alexandru Potocean as Mircea
- Radouan Leflahi as Hadi
- Cendana Trifan as Catalina
- Ionut Niculae as Alex
- Alex Calin as Claudiu
- George Piștereanu as Stroia
- Rolando Matsangos as Dan

== Reception ==
On the review aggregator website Rotten Tomatoes, 83% of 12 critics' reviews are positive, with an average rating of 6.90/10.

Wendy Ide of Screen International called actor Alexandru Potocean "superb" and lauded the film: "After a hesitant start, this adept first feature quickly gathers momentum, delivering a knotty portrait of a man who, like the culture in which he lives, is still wrestling with the very idea of homosexuality." Dennis Harvey of the San Francisco Bay Guardian praised the film: "Like much Romanian cinema, [the film] takes a very close look at basically a single incident, its narrow focus and minimalist feel leading to a sense of strong, even devastating character (and societal) insight." Bobby LePire of Film Threat commended the lead actor: "To that end, Conrad Mericoffer is brilliant as Cristi. The actor subtly shows the pressures from both outside and inside forces that are tearing him apart."

Colette De Castro of the East European Film Bulletin raved about the homage to others: "This part of the film is reminiscent of the work of fellow Romanian directors Cristi Puiu and Radu Muntean. The muted self-expression of a main character struggling within the confines of a role that society has set for him, all against a simplified background that leaves the viewer feeling trapped and claustrophobic, are recognizable traits of this slightly older generation of Romanian filmmakers." Ayelet Dekel of Midnight East extolled the film: "And it is that complexity, the critical eye cast on the individuals and the culture in which they live, that makes [this] a strong, thought-provoking film."
