= You're Ugly Too =

2015 film directed by Mark Noonan

- Film poster
- Directed by: Mark Noonan
- Written by: Mark Noonan
- Produced by: Conor Barry; John Keville
- Starring: Aidan Gillen
- Cinematography: Tom Comerford
- Edited by: Colin Campbell
- Music by: David Geraghty
- Production company: Savage Productions
- Release dates: 7 February 2015 (Berlin); 24 July 2015 (Ireland)
- Running time: 81 minutes
- Country: Ireland
- Language: English

You're Ugly Too is a 2015 Irish drama film directed and written by Mark Noonan.

== Synopsis ==
Will receives parole from prison to care for his 11-year-old niece Stacey, who has been orphaned after the death of her widowed mother, Will's sister. As they head towards the Irish midlands and try to be a family, they encounter a series of obstacles. Stacey is rejected at the local school because she has narcolepsy, a condition she has recently developed. Will, who repeatedly disobeys the parole conditions in his disastrous attempts to be a responsible father figure, has to find employment and prove that he can provide a stable environment for Stacey, before it is officially decided whether or not Stacey returns to the foster system and Will to prison to complete his sentence.

== Cast ==
- Aidan Gillen as Will
- Lauren Kinsella as Stacey
- Simon McQuaid as Barman
- Jesse Morris as Angry Driver
- George Piştereanu as Tibor
- Erika Sainte as Emilie
- Steve Wall as Lawyer
