= The Graduates (1986 film) =

- Directed by: Nicolae Corjos
- Starring: Ștefan Bănică Jr. Oana Sîrbu; Mihai Constantin
- Release date: 27 October 1986
- Running time: 95 minutes
- Country: Romania
- Language: Romanian

The Graduates (Romanian: Liceenii) is a 1986 Romanian coming-of-age film directed by Nicolae Corjos. It tells the story of Mihai (Ștefan Bănică Jr.), a provincial who attends a high school in Bucharest, and Dana (Oana Sîrbu), an accomplished chess player. Eventually, Mihai's attraction to Dana leads him to neglect his studies in favor of pursuing her.

Their romance will be full of naturalness, but it will go through many trials. Along with the young performers, other well-directed roles belong to actors Ion Caramitru and Tamara Buciuceanu, who play the idealistic history teacher, the class teacher, called "Socrates" by the students, and the strict math teacher nicknamed "Isoscel", respectively.

== Cast ==
- Ștefan Bănică Jr. - Mihai
- Mihai Constantin - Ionică
- Oana Sîrbu - Dana
- Cesonia Postelnicu - Geta
- Tudor Petrut - Şerban
- Tamara Buciuceanu - Isoscel
- Ion Caramitru - Socrate
- Silviu Stănculescu - Şerban's Father
- Dorina Lazăr - Şerban's Mother
- Sebastian Papaiani - Mihai's Father
