= Aurora (2010 film) =

- Directed by: Cristi Puiu
- Written by: Cristi Puiu
- Produced by: Anca Puiu; Bobby Păunescu
- Starring: Cristi Puiu
- Cinematography: Viorel Sergovici
- Edited by: Ion Ioachim Stroe
- Production company: Mandragora
- Release date: 14 May 2010 (Cannes)
- Running time: 181 minutes
- Country: Romania
- Language: Romanian
- Budget: € 2 million

Aurora is a 2010 Romanian film written and directed by Cristi Puiu, who also plays the main character. Producer Anca Puiu has described the plot as a "crime story from a new perspective." It is the second installment in Puiu's planned suite "Six Stories from the Outskirts of Bucharest", the first being The Death of Mr. Lazarescu from 2005. It was screened in the Un Certain Regard section at the 2010 Cannes Film Festival.

== Cast ==
- Cristi Puiu as Viorel
- Clara Vodă as Gina
- Valeria Seciu as Pusa
- Gelu Colceag as Mr. Livinski
- Luminița Gheorghiu as Mioara Avram
- Gigi Ifrim as neighbour
- Lucian Ifrim
- Carmela Culda
- Ileana Puiu as Olguța
- Catrinel Dumitrescu as Mrs. Livinski

== Synopsis ==
The main character, Viorel, is divorced. He does not handle the divorce very well. In a car park, he murders the notary that represented his former wife, along with the woman who happens to be with the notary. He then murders his former in-laws. At the end, he turns himself in to the police, confessing to the murders. The film follows him as he prepares for the murders, buying the illegally made firing pins, and purchasing a shotgun.

== Production ==
Production was led by the Romanian company Mandragora, and co-produced by France's Société Française de Coproduction, Switzerland's Bord Cadre Films and Germany's Essential Filmproduktion. The total production budget was 2 million Euro, including 380,000 Euro from the Romanian National Center of Cinematography and 250,000 Euro from Eurimages. Puiu spent five months searching for an appropriate lead actor before deciding to cast himself. Since the role involved several driving scenes he had to get a driving licence before filming could begin. Filming took place between February and May 2009.

== Reception ==
On review aggregator website Rotten Tomatoes, the film holds an approval rating of 77% based on 30 reviews, with an average rating of 6.9/10.

== See also ==
- Romanian New Wave
