= Happy Funerals =

- Film poster
- Romanian: Funeralii fericite
- Directed by: Horațiu Mălăele
- Written by: Adrian Lustig
- Starring: Horațiu Mălăele; Crina Semciuc; Igor Caras-Romanov
- Distributed by: MediaPro Distribution
- Release date: June 7, 2013
- Running time: 111 minutes
- Country: Romania
- Language: Romanian

Happy Funerals (Romanian: Funeralii fericite) is a 2013 Romanian comedy-drama film directed by Horațiu Mălăele.

== Plot ==
Three heavy boozers - a Romanian (Horatiu Malaele), a Russian (Igor Caras-Romanov) and a Bulgarian (Mihai Gruia Sandu) - are tripling away their... happiness, into vodka, at "The Happy Immigrant", a joint kept by a Turk.

== Cast ==
- Bogdan Mălăele — Translator Vasile
- Oana Ștefănescu — Doamna
- Adrian Ciobanu — Agent asigurări
- Igor Caras-Romanov — Igor
- Sandu Mihai Gruia — Kiril
- Serghei Niculescu-Mizil — Albanezu'
- Constantin Chiriac — Proprietar pompe funebre
- Virginia Rogin — Țiganca
- Dorina Lazăr — Tanti Nela
- Costina Ciuciulică — Educatoarea
- Carol Ionescu — Clachetistul
- Hector Severino — Hector
- Meda Andreea Victor — Mama lui Lionel
- Marius Damian — Șoferul
- Valentin Popescu — Cătălin
- Ruxandra Maniu — Personaj 2
- Valentin Florea — Îngerul
- Coco Paliu — Coco
- Crina Semciuc — Lili
- Maria Obretin — Invitată 2
- Gheorghe Ifrim — Directorul
- Sergiu Costache — Ahmed
- Florin Zamfirescu — Cerșetor
- Ionel Mihăilescu — Manolache
- Letiția Vlădescu — Invitata 1
- Antoaneta Zaharia — Giuseppina
- Maria Teslaru — Jana
- Nicoleta Lefter — Macheuza
- Marius Galea — Lionel la 30 de ani
- Nicolae Stângaciu — Groparul
- Dimitrie Bogomaz — Vaniușka
- Iulian Postelnicu — Doru
- Ștefan Alexa — Individual
- Alin State — Lucian
- Puiu Mircea Lăscuș — Samir
- Vitalie Bantaș — Grișa
- Doinița Ghițescu — Îngrijitoarea
- Cristian Mălăele — Lionel la 14 ani
- Alexandru Bindea — Peppino
- Beatrice Peter — Mercedes
- Mihai Dorobanțu — Polițist Șoimulescu
- Adhiambo Rose Beatrice — Jewel
- Dan Rădulescu — Lionel la 20 de ani
- Cuzin Toma — Tatăl lui Lionel
- Roxana Guttman — Rashida
- Sorin Dobrin — Arlechin 1
- Ilinca Manolache — Secretară de platou
- Horațiu Mălăele — Lionel
- Corneliu Jipa — Preotul
- Maggie Edimoh — Cindy
- Bogdan Cotleț — Marcel
- Adriana Șchiopu — Locatara
- Tudorel Filimon — Colegul
- Mihai Niță — Arlechin 2
- Alexandru Georgescu — Polițist Porumbel
- Andreea Samson — Lavinia
