= Alexandru Potocean =

Romanian actor

- Born: 1984 (age 41–42); Timișoara, Romania
- Occupation: Actor
- Years active: 2005-present

Alexandru Potocean (Romanian pronunciation: [alekˈsandru potoˈt͡ʃe̯an]; born 1984) is a Romanian film actor. He has appeared in more than fifteen films since 2005.

== Early life and education ==
Potocean was born in Caransebeș and grew up in Timișoara and Petrila. He studied drama at the I. L. Caragiale National University of Theatre and Film (UNATC) in Bucharest.

== Selected filmography ==
Film
Year	Title	Role	Notes
2010	The Way Back	Tomasz	
2010	Portrait of the Fighter as a Young Man		
2010	The Whistleblower	Viko Mezovic	
2009	Tales from the Golden Age		
2008	Silent Wedding		
2007	4 Months, 3 Weeks and 2 Days	Adi Radu	
2006	The Paper Will Be Blue		
2014	Big Hero 6	Alistair Krei (Romanian dubbing)	Voice
2016	Dincolo de calea ferată	Radu	
2020	Poppy Field	Mircea	
