= Silent Wedding =

- Romanian release poster
- Directed by: Horațiu Mălăele
- Written by: Adrian Lustig; Horațiu Mălăele
- Produced by: Vlad Păunescu
- Starring: Meda Victor; Alexandru Potocean; Valentin Teodosiu; Alexandru Bindea; Tudorel Filimon; Nicolae Urs
- Cinematography: Vivi Drăgan Vasile
- Edited by: Cristian Nicolescu
- Music by: Alexandru Andrieș
- Distributed by: Castel Film (Romania); Agat Films & Cie (France); Samsa Film (Luxemburg)
- Release date: June 6, 2008
- Running time: 84 minutes
- Country: Romania
- Language: Romanian

Silent Wedding (Romanian: Nunta mută) is a 2008 Romanian comedy-drama film about a young couple who was about to celebrate their marriage in 1953, but they were ordered to desist by the occupying Red Army and Communist authorities because the Soviet leader Joseph Stalin had died the night before. Since they could not openly celebrate, the wedding-goers try to party in silence.

It was directed by Horațiu Mălăele.

== Plot ==
The film is presented as a story within a story. It begins in the present day with a team of journalists who visit an isolated, abandoned town with the intention of investigating a series of unusual, unexplained events. However, they discover that the only inhabitants are a group of elderly women and the mayor, the only male resident. The mayor then tells them a strange story that took place on March 5, 1953.

At that time, the village was in the midst of preparing for the wedding of a young couple, Iancu and Mara. The day before the ceremony, however, the death of Soviet leader Joseph Stalin is announced, and a mandatory seven-day period of national mourning is declared. Despite the official ban on all celebrations, the villagers decide to proceed with the wedding, as all the food has been prepared and the guests have already arrived. They agree to conduct a "silent wedding" and celebrate discreetly inside a house with the windows boarded up to contain any noise.

As the wedding progresses, the guests have a good time and forget their vow of silence. The "silent wedding" transforms into a "loud wedding," turning into a full-blown party with music and dancing. However, in the midst of the celebration, the turret of a Soviet tank suddenly enters the house, interrupting the festivities. All the men are subsequently deported.

== Cast ==
- Meda Andreea Victor as Mara
- Alexandru Potocean as Iancu
- Valentin Teodosiu as Grigore Aschie
- Alexandru Bindea as Gogonea
- Tudorel Filimon as Haralamb Vrabie
- Nicolae Urs as Mutu
- Luminița Gheorghiu as Fira
- Ioana Anton as Smaranda
- Dan Condurache as Mardare
- Doru Ana as Cârnu
- Șerban Pavlu as Coriolan
- Catrinel Dumitrescu as Iancu's mother
- Puiu Dănilă as Ulcior
- Tamara Buciuceanu as Grandmother
- Victor Rebengiuc as Grandfather
- George Mihăiță as Valentin Gogonea
- George Chițu as Gogonică

== Historical and Political Background ==
Silent Wedding is a film set in Romania in 1953, specifically during the days leading up to and including the day of Stalin's death. This period of Romanian history, which affected the entire Eastern Bloc, was marked by the consolidation of Communist rule under Gheorghe Gheorghiu-Dej, following the country's alignment with the Soviet Union after World War II. At the time, Europe was divided by what is famously known as the "Iron Curtain": a political, military, and ideological barrier imposed by the Soviet Union.

In the 1950s, Romanian life was heavily influenced by Sovietization, a push to adopt Russian customs and language. However, these efforts largely failed to change Romanians' preference for Western culture. The Communist regime of terror was characterized by strict political control, censorship, repression, and the suppression of dissent, all of which heavily impacted daily life and limited personal freedom.

On March 5, 1953, the death of Joseph Stalin at the age of 74 was announced, and a mandatory national day of mourning was declared across the Eastern Bloc. In all Soviet-controlled countries, flags were lowered, schools and offices were closed, and all forms of entertainment and celebration were canceled. The emotional impact was intense: some who had grown up during his era saw Stalin as a strong leader and a symbol of hope, while others exaggerated their mourning to appear loyal to the regime.

== Cinematographic Elements and Techniques ==
Silent Wedding employs a range of cinematographic and narrative techniques that contribute to its narrative depth and thematic richness.

=== Silence ===
The film makes "inventive use of silence". This lack of sound serves to represent a setting "where censorship prevails" and to assert that "voicing opinions is dangerous in certain contexts". The silence also creates a dramatic effect, underscoring the tension of the situation. According to one analysis, the film ultimately highlights the "sacrifices which had to be made on the way towards finding a voice to overthrow the silence". (p. 17, 18 y 28)

=== Humor ===
The film's aesthetic is noted for its "tragi-comic vein". The use of humor represents a specific cultural trait of Romanians, highlighting their ability to use comedy as a "form of cathartic release" and a way of coping with conflict and surviving difficult times. (p. 19, 20 y 21)

=== Time Shifts ===
The film's narrative structure uses time shifts, moving between the present and the past. These shifts allow for the depiction of "two contrasting moments in Romanian history: a tragic present and a promising past". One analysis notes the "reversed symbolism" used to portray these periods as "bland versus bright". (p. 16, 21 y 17)

=== Circularity ===
The film "ends by circularly returning to its opening scenes". This technique serves to retrace the narrative for emphasis and to suggest "the trap of history repeating itself". (p. 19)

=== Symbolism ===
The film uses symbolic elements to reinforce its themes. Mara's birthmark on her neck is a symbol of identity that allows the audience to recognize her as one of the survivors at the end of the film. The birthmark is shaped like the post-war map of Romania and holds "well-known historical and cultural implications". The film also includes fantastic scenes, such as the little girl's prediction of Iancu's destiny, that support the popular belief in the Fates and suggest the idea of an unavoidable fate. (p. 25 y 20)
