= Șerban Ionescu =

Romanian actor

- Born: 23 September 1950; Corabia, Olt County, Romania
- Died: 21 November 2012 (aged 62); Bucharest, Romania
- Occupation: Actor
- Years active: 1979–2009
- Spouse: Magdalena-Marta "Magda" Catone

Șerban Ionescu (Romanian pronunciation: [ʃerˈban joˈnesku]; 23 September 1950 – 21 November 2012) was a Romanian actor, born in Corabia, Olt County.

Ionescu was diagnosed with ALS in 2011 and died at Floreasca Emergency Hospital in Bucharest on 21 November 2012.

== Filmography ==
- Ion: Blestemul pământului, blestemul iubirii (1979)
- Capcana mercenarilor (1981)
- Lumini și umbre (TV, 1981)
- Lumini și umbre: Partea II (TV, 1982)
- Imposibila iubire (1983)
- Acasă (1984)
- Furtună în Pacific (1985)
- Marele premiu (1985)
- Bătălia din umbră (1986)
- Pădurea (1986)
- Pădureanca (1987)
- Martori dispăruți (1988)
- Mircea (1989)
- Lacrima cerului (1989)
- Cezara (1991)
- Începutul adevărului (Oglinda) (1994)
- Prea târziu (1996)
- Aerisirea (TV, 1998)
- Față în față (1999)
- Maria (2003) – Ion
- Sindromul Timișoara – Manipularea (2004)
- "15" (2005)
- Cuscrele (serial TV, 2005) - Mihai (Mișu) Casapu
- Azucena – Îngerul de abanos (2005)
- Om sărac, om bogat (serial TV, 2006)
- Happy End (2006) – senatorul Costea
- De ce eu? (2006)
- Visuri otrăvite (2006)
- Păcală se întoarce (2006)
- Anticamera (serial TV, 2008)
- Dincolo de America (2008)
- Fetele marinarului (serial TV, 2008)
- Pac! Ești mort (2009)
