= George Piștereanu =

Romanian actor

- Born: 13 November 1990 (age 35); Bucharest, Romania
- Education: Caragiale National University of Theatre and Film
- Occupation: Actor
- Years active: 2007–present
- Height: 184 cm (6 ft 0 in)
- Spouse: Giorgiana Grassu (m. 2022)
- Website: www.georgepistereanu.com

George Piștereanu (born 13 November 1990) is a Romanian actor. He lives in Los Angeles, California. His major role was Silviu in "If I Want to Whistle, I Whistle" – a Florin Șerban drama which received the Silver Bear and Alfred Bauer awards at the 2010 Berlin Film Festival. This drama earned Piștereanu his first Best Actor Award at the Stockholm Film Festival and a nomination for the European Best Actor at the European Film Awards in 2011.

After graduation from the Caragiale National University of Theatre and Film in 2012, he was an actor at the National Theatre Bucharest in drama and comedy plays – Mozart in the Amadeus play (2015) as well as other plays in the company of some of Romania's best known actors: Sebastian Papaiani, Ion Dichiseanu, Victoria Cocias.

His career continued to ascend through movie roles: Luca main role in "Loverboy" (2011), Tibor in "You're Ugly Too" drama nominated for the Generation K-Plus at the Berlinale Film Festival 2014, Alex in "The Whistler" (2018) drama nominated for the Cannes Official Selection 2019, Vali in "The Asset" (2021) and Carlos in "The Contractor" (2022).

Piștereanu's acting career extends in many Romanian Television series, playing Tibor in "Vlad", a popular television drama.

In addition to acting, he has trained in paragliding with Ecos Paragliding, boxing at CS Dinamo Bucharest, kickboxing at Superkombat Academy in Bucharest, and competitive swimming at the 23 August National Sports Club. He also practiced Krav Maga stick fighting under instructor Vasile Niță, earning a black belt. Piștereanu began training in Brazilian jiu-jitsu (BJJ) at Ribeiro Jiu-Jitsu Club (now 6 Blades Jiu-Jitsu) under coach Petre Gîtlan. He later continued his training at the Jean Jacques Machado Academy under coach Mark Mireles, under whose supervision he further developed his technical approach and progression in the sport. He currently holds a purple belt in Brazilian jiu-jitsu.

== Selected filmography ==
Year	Title	Role
2010	If I Want to Whistle, I Whistle	Silviu
2011	Loverboy	Luca
2012	The Salt Boulder	Virgil Mărculescu
2015	Casualty, Exile	Cristian Văduva
2015	You're Ugly Too	Tibor
2015	The Miracle of Tekir	Julio
2016	Minte-mă Frumos în Centrul Vechi	Marcel
2016	Nelly's Adeventures	Iancu
2019	The Whistlers (film)	Alin
2019	Profu'	Tibor
2019-2021	Vlad	Tibor
2020	Poppy Field	Stroia
2021	The Protégé	Vali
2022	The Contractor (2022 film)	Carlos
	The Perfect Escape 2022	Taxi Driver
