= Horațiu Mălăele =

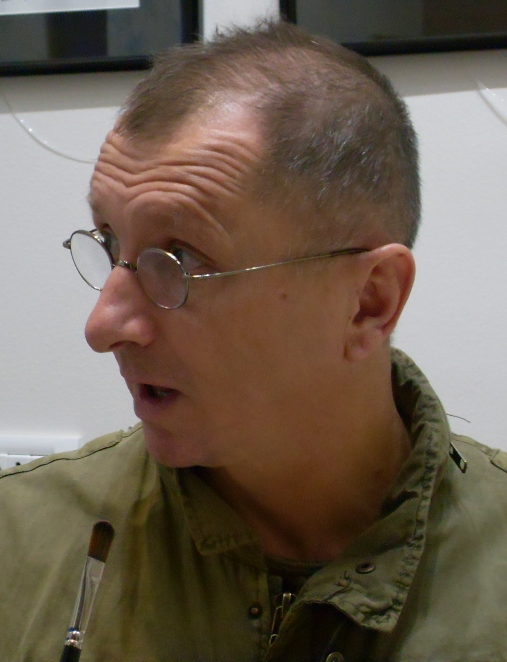
Mălăele, 2010

Horațiu-Valentin Mălăele (born 31 July 1952) is a Romanian actor, cartoonist, writer, and theater and film director. In this last capacity he is often associated with the Romanian New Wave.

== Biography ==
Born in 1952 Târgu-Jiu, he had a public art exhibit in his final year of secondary school, the first of over 30 as of 2016.

Mălăele graduated in 1975 from the I.L. Caragiale Institute of Theatre and Film Arts in Bucharest and first became a professional actor with the National Theater of Romania in Piatra Neamț. He returned to Bucharest, where he became a prominent actor, working in many of Romania's leading theaters including Nottara, Odeon, and Bulandra. He then became a director, directing such plays as O sărbătoare princiară ("A Princely Feast") by Teodor Mazilu (1982 at Nottara Theatre), A Flea in Her Ear by Georges Feydeau (1993 at Nottara Theatre), and Carlo contra Carlo ("Carlo against Carlo") by Paul Ioachim (1994 at the Odeon), which won him that year's Romanian Comedy Festival Prize. He has since directed over a dozen other stage productions.

He first appeared as a film actor in 1974, appearing in two films that year: Păcală ("Caution") and Muntele Ascuns ("The Hidden Mountain", and has gone on to act in over two dozen other films. He also directed Pălăria ("The Hat", 2004, TV movie), Nunta mută ("Silent Wedding", 2008), Funeralii fericite ("Happy Funerals", 2013) and Luca (2020).

He has also written two books: the autobiographical Horațiu despre Mălăele ("Horațiu about Mălăele", ISBN 9731812172, and Wanderings, a collection of short episodes, aphorisms, and memories.

== Selected filmography ==
Film
Year	Title	Role	Notes
1974	Muntele ascuns	Petru	
1979	Ciocolată cu alune	Victor Alexe	
1985	Primăvara Bobocilor	Ionuț, Varvara's son	
2001	Everyday God Kisses Us On The Mouth	Milicia Officer	
2006	La urgență	Dr. Iordan Gaman	
2007	Logodnicii din America	Willy	
2008	Vine poliția!	Traian Corbescu	
2009	The Army of Crime	Monsieur Dupont	
2010	Nuntă în Basarabia	Willy	
2011	Moștenirea	Ionuț, Varvara's son	
2012	Îngeri pierduți	Eugen	
2013	Funeralii Fericite	Lionel	
2018	Moromeții 2	Ilie Moromete	
