= Mircea Mureșan =

Romanian film director (1928–2020)

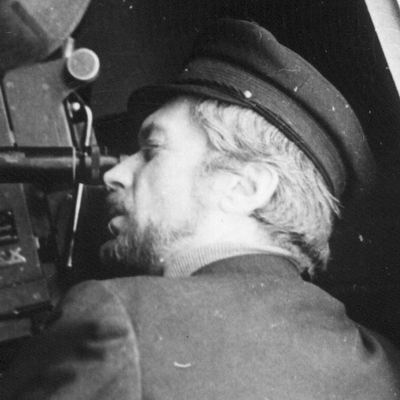
- Born: Mircea-Nicolae-Ioan Mureșian; 11 November 1928; Sibiu, Kingdom of Romania
- Died: 24 April 2020 (aged 91); Bucharest, Romania
- Resting place: Bellu Cemetery, Bucharest
- Education: Institute of Theatre and Film I.L. Caragiale
- Occupation: Film director
- Years active: 1961–2005
- Employer: State Theatre of Sibiu
- Notable work: Răscoala (1965); Toate pînzele sus (1976); Blestemul pământului, blestemul iubirii (1979)
- Spouse: Rodica Mureșan
- Awards: National Order of Faithful Service, Knight rank

Mircea Mureșan (11 November 1928 – 24 April 2020) was a Romanian film director. He directed 22 films between 1961 and 2004. Mureșan won the prize for Best First Work at the 1966 Cannes Film Festival for the film Răscoala.

Born in Sibiu, he attended from 1939 to 1947 the Gheorghe Lazăr High School in his native city. He then played at the State Theatre of Sibiu for four years, after which he went to Bucharest to pursue his studies, graduating from the Institute of Film I.L. Caragiale in 1955.

His film career, which began with film adaptations, gradually reoriented towards comedy, with rare trips into documentaries. From 1974 to 1989 Mureșan was vice-president of the Romanian Filmmakers Association. In 2002, he was awarded by then-President Ion Iliescu the National Order of Faithful Service, Knight rank.

He was married to actress Rodica Mureșan. He died in Bucharest in 2020, aged 91, and was buried in the city's Bellu Cemetery.

== Filmography ==
- Toamna se numără bobocii, 1961 (screenwriter, with András Sütő)
- Partea ta de vină, 1963
- Răscoala, 1965
- K.O., 1968 (screenwriter, with Eugen Popiță)
- Baltagul, 1969 (scenario after Mihail Sadoveanu's eponymous novel)
- Lunga noapte de șase ani, 1970 (documentary, has been destroyed)
- Asediul, 1970 (screenwriter, with Corneliu Leu)
- Bariera, 1972
- Porțile albastre ale orașului, 1973
- Toate pînzele sus, 1976 (for TV; screenwriter, with Alexandru Struțeanu)
- Împușcături sub clar de lună, 1977
- Blestemul pământului, blestemul iubirii, 1979
- Întoarcere la dragostea dintâi, 1981 (screenwriter)
- Lumini și umbre, 1981–1982 (for TV; with Andrei Blaier and Mihai Constantinescu)
- O lebădă, iarna, 1983
- Horea, 1984
- Cei mai frumoși 20 de ani, 1985
- Maria și marea, 1988
- Miss Litoral, 1991
- A doua cădere a Constantinopolului, 1994
- Sexy Harem Ada Kaleh, 2001 (screenwriter)
- Vrăjitoarea Azucena – Îngerul de abanos, 2004 (screenwriter)
