= Ioana Crăciunescu =

Romanian actress and poet

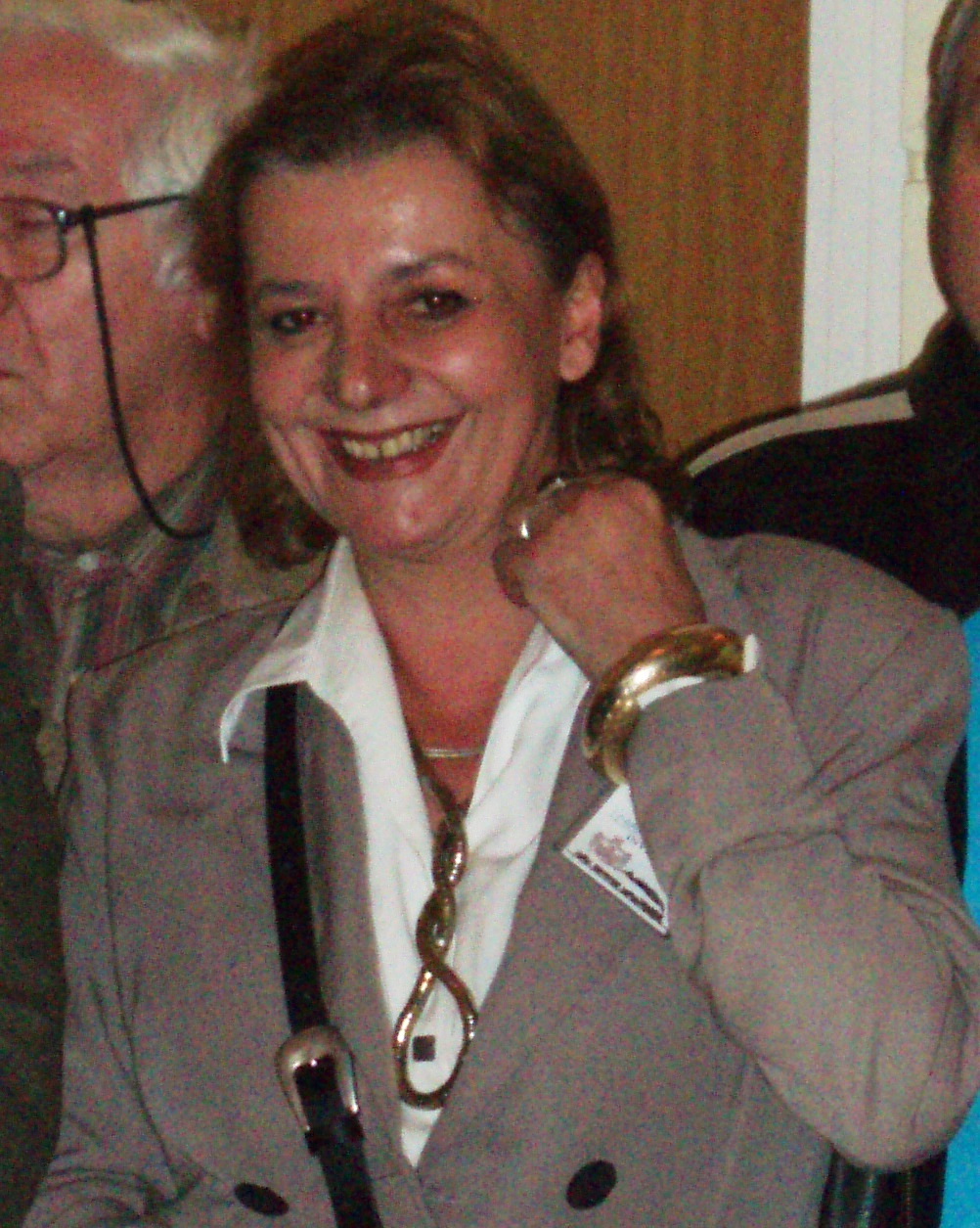
Crăciunescu in 2008

Ioana Crăciunescu (born 1950) is a Romanian actress and poet. She has published six volumes of collected poetry, beginning in 1980, and was awarded the Writers' Union of Romania Prize in 1981. In 2009, she received the Nichita Stănescu National Poetry Award from the Romanian Ministry of Culture. She is also known for her performance as Ana Baciu in the 1979 film Blestemul pământului, blestemul iubirii (The curse of the land, the curse of love).

== Biography ==
Ioana, also named Luminita, Crăciunescu, was born in Bucharest in 1950, the daughter of a civil engineer. She studied at the Caragiale Academy of Theatrical Arts and Cinematography in her native city and in 1973 became a member of the Nottara Theatre Company. She has published six volumes of collected poetry beginning with Duminica absentă (Sunday absent) in 1980 for which she won the Writers' Union of Romania Prize the following year. Crăciunescu's poetry has themes of loss, grief, fear, failure and shame.

She made her film debut in 1974 and achieved her first major success in 1979 as Ana Baciu in the film Blestemul pământului, blestemul iubirii (The curse of the land, the curse of love). In 1991, she went to France to continue her acting career, primarily as a stage actress. Fifteen years later, she returned to Romania for a brief period and since then has divided her time between the two countries.

== Awards and honours ==
In 2009, she received the Nichita Stănescu National Poetry Award from the Romanian Ministry of Culture.

== Publications ==
& Scrisori dintr-un cîmp cu maci : [versuri] , 1977

- Supa de ceapă, 1981
- Iarnă clinică : versuri, 1983
- Maşinăria cu aburi : versuri, 1984
- Caietul cu adnotări, 1988
- Hiver clinique : poèmes, 1996
- Du front et des griffes, 1998
