= Tamara Buciuceanu =

Romanian actress (1929–2019)

Tamara Buciuceanu-Botez Grand Cross and Sash ranks of the Order of the Crown of Romania
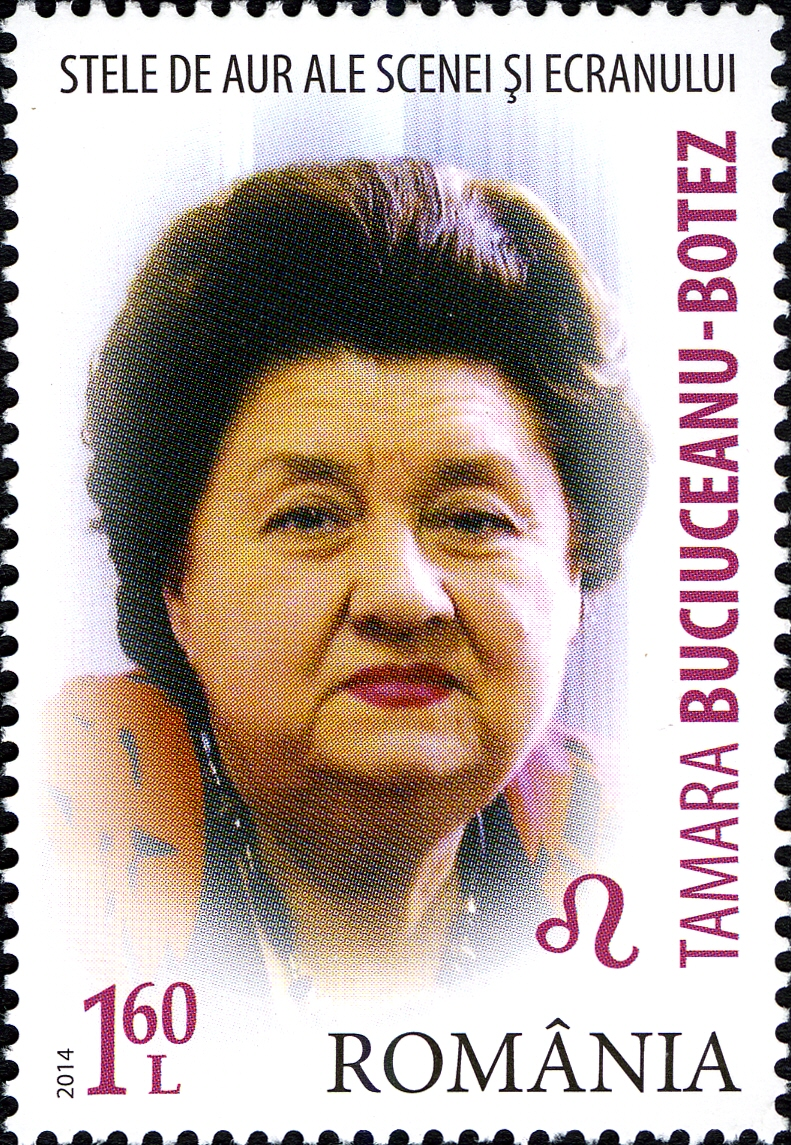
- The original stamp with one of the great Romanian actress, 2014
- Born: 10 August 1929; Tighina, Kingdom of Romania (today de facto Bender, Transnistria, de jure Tighina, Moldova)
- Died: 15 October 2019 (aged 90); Bucharest, Romania
- Occupations: TV and stage actress
- Years active: 1952–2019
- Spouse: Alexandru Botez (m. 1962–1996)
- Relatives: Iulia Buciuceanu (sister); Lizon (sister); Elizabeta (niece); Costel (son-in-law); Nicolae (son-in-law)

Tamara Buciuceanu-Botez (10 August 1929 – 15 October 2019) was a Romanian stage, screen and television actress, as well a known TV personality. She was one of the most successful Romanian actresses of the 1960s–2000s who worked at Odeon Theatre, known for Liceenii (1986), Liceenii Rock 'n' Roll (1992), Silent Wedding (2008) and Everybody in Our Family (2012).

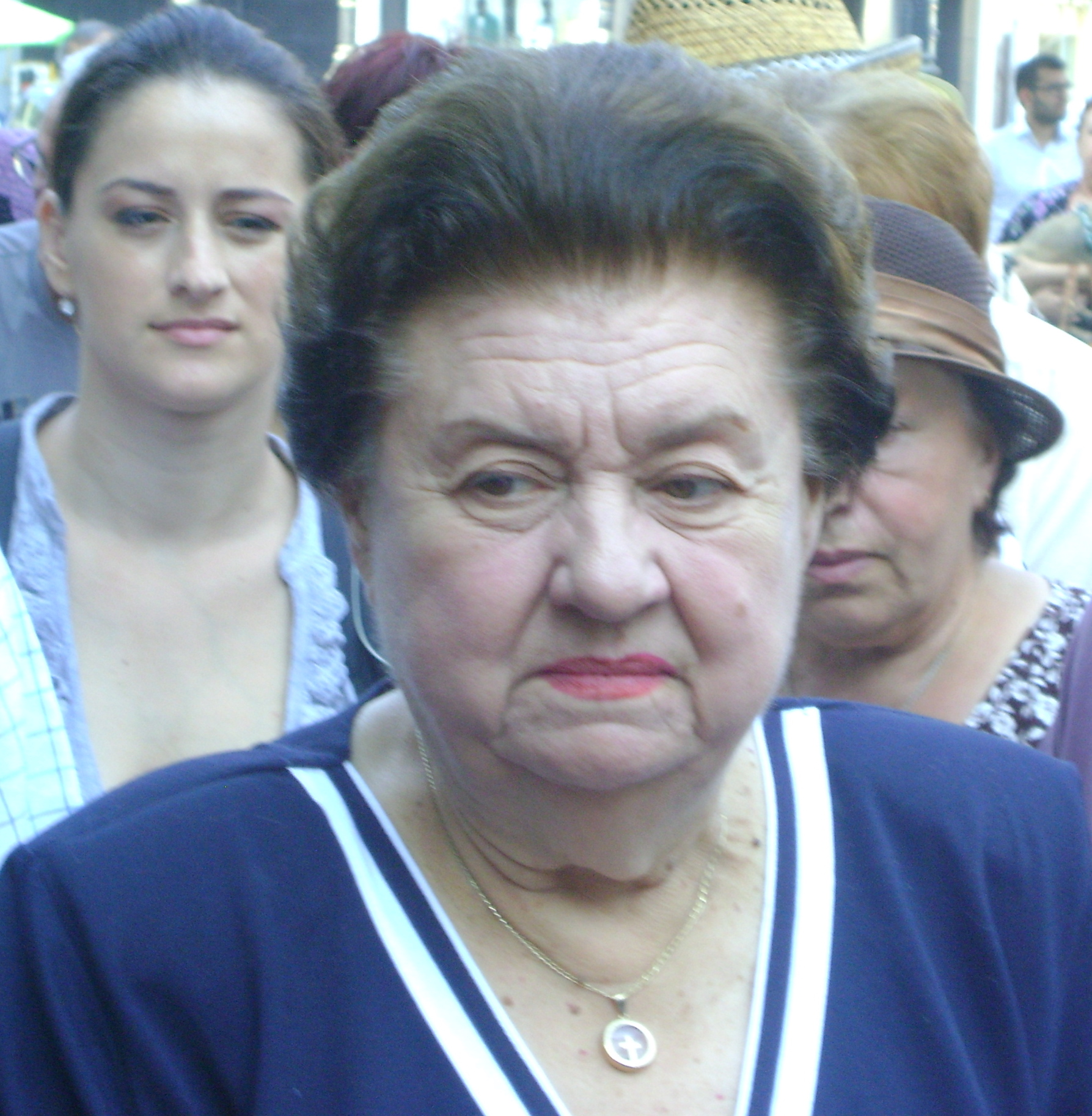
Tamara Buciuceanu in 2011

== Biography ==
In 1948–1951, she attended Iasi Theatre Institute "Vasile Alecsandri", but being at the fourth year, she decided to move to Bucharest to the Institute of Theater and Cinematography and to attend the class of professor Nicolae Balteteanu (Sorana Coroama-Stanca assistant). Tamara Buciuceanu graduated in 1952. She is one of the representatives of the golden generation of the Romanian theater. She is called "The Lady of the Romanian Comedy", being one of the legendary figures of the comedy theater. She has starred in more than 25 films, and her emblematic character being Isoscel teacher from the "Liceenii" series. In 2009, at her 80-year-old anniversary she also celebrated the 57-year-long career jubilee in drama and film.

She performed on the stages of Giulesti, Bulandra, and National and of the Comedy theaters, etc. She also performed in Coana Chiriţa role on the stage of the Iași National Theatre.

== Death ==
On 15 October 2019, Tamara Buciuceanu died at the Elias Hospital in Bucharest due to serious heart problems.

== Filmography ==
- Titanic Waltz (1964)
- Anecdota (1972) - TV film
- Scorpia (1973) - TV film
- Vegetarian (1973)
- La spațiul locativ (1975) - TV film
- Doctor fără voie (1976) - TV film
- Ma-ma (1976)
- Ultimele zile ale verii (1976)
- Domnișoara Nastasia (1976) - TV film
- Premiera (1976)
- Serenadă pentru etajul XII (1976)
- Toate pînzele sus (TV series, 1977) - ep. 2, 12
- Vis de ianuarie (1978)
- Melodii, melodii (1978)
- Blestemul pământului, blestemul iubirii (1979) - Maria Herdelea
- Cântec pentru fiul meu (1980)
- Alo, aterizează străbunica!... (1981)
- De ce trag clopotele, Mitică? (1981)
- Grăbește-te încet (1981)
- Înghițitorul de săbii (1981)
- Șantaj (1981)
- Prea tineri pentru riduri (1982)
- Chirița în provincie (1982) - TV play
- Sfantul Mitica Blajinu (1982) - TV play
- Bocet vesel (1983)
- Declarație de dragoste (1985) - Isoscel
- Cuibul de viespi (1986)
- Liceenii (1986) - Isoscel
- Primăvara bobocilor (1987) - Varvara
- Punct și de la capăt (1987)
- Extemporal la dirigenție (1988) - Isoscel
- Dimineața pierdută (1990) - TV play
- Liceenii Rock'n'Roll (1991) - Isoscel
- Titanic vals (1993) - TV movie
- Liceenii în alertă (1993) - Isoscel
- Paradisul în direct (1994)
- Sexy Harem Ada-Kaleh (2001)
- Lazy Town (2004–2014) - Bessie Busybody (Romanian dub)
- Agenția matrimonială (2005) - TV series
- Cuscrele (2005) - TV series - Mathilda Baboniu
- Inimă de țigan (2007) - Varvara
- Silent Wedding (2008)
- The Princess and the Frog (2009) - Mama Odie (Romanian dub, speaking voice)
- State de România (2010) - Zenovia Popeanga, Marcel's mother
- Everybody in Our Family (2012)
- Rio 2 (2014) - Aunt Mimi (Romanian dub)
