= Florian Pittiș =

Romanian actor, singer, and director

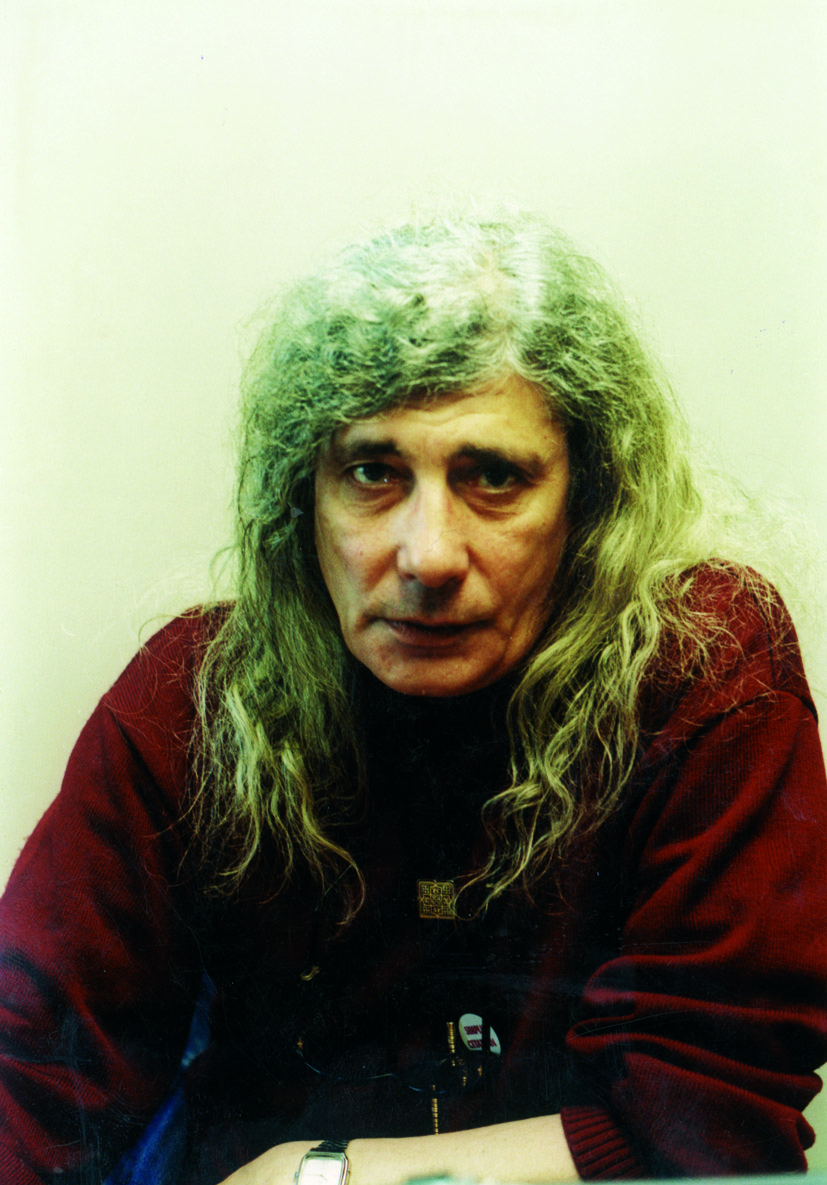
- Born: 4 October 1943; Bucharest, Kingdom of Romania
- Died: 5 August 2007 (aged 63); Bucharest, Romania
- Resting place: Bellu Cemetery, Bucharest
- Education: Gheorghe Lazăr National College (Bucharest)
- Alma mater: I. L. Caragiale National University of Theatre and Film
- Awards: Order of Cultural Merit

Florian Pittiș (Romanian: [floriˈan ˈpitiʃ]; 4 October 1943– 5 August 2007) was a Romanian stage and television actor, theatre director, folk music singer, and radio producer.

== Biography ==
Born in Bucharest, Florian Pittis attended the Gheorghe Lazăr High School in his native city. He then studied at Politehnica University and graduated in 1966 from the Institute of Theatre and Film, class of Radu Beligan. As a young actor he was hired at one of the best theatres in Bucharest, the Bulandra Theatre, where he worked with directors such as Andrei Șerban, Liviu Ciulei, and Alexandru Tocilescu. In the early 1970s, he studied in Paris with the well-known mime artist, Marcel Marceau.

In 1992, Pittiș was one of the founding members of the band Pasărea Colibri. In 1998, he became the director of Radio Romania Tineret, known as Radio3Net since 2004, the only Romanian radio station that broadcasts exclusively on the Internet.

A great admirer of Bob Dylan, he had translated and adapted some of Dylan's songs: A Hard Rain's A-Gonna Fall, Death is Not the End, Don't Think Twice, It's All Right, Mr. Tambourine Man, Rainy Day Women#12 & 35, She Belongs to Me, Silvio.

Emblematic for his long hair, informal wear, and habit of smoking "Carpați", a brand of filterless cigarettes. Pittis was appreciated for his very particular voice, as a singer, on stage, and as a voice-over in television programs. He was called "the prophet of the blue-jeans generation".

In the Benelux and Norway he is remembered for his role as the Parrot in the 1976 Romanian-Soviet-French co-production children musical movie Ma-ma, The English title of the movie was called Rock'n Roll Wolf, it aired on Dutch television in 1980, and it is known as Med Grimm og Gru in Norway, where the film first aired in 1983. For being popular in his own country he received an offer from Walt Disney Pictures in 1993, and provides the voice of Winnie-the-Pooh for the Romanian version of the series, The New Adventures of Winnie the Pooh, being among the first actors in the country to dub a Disney series in Romanian.

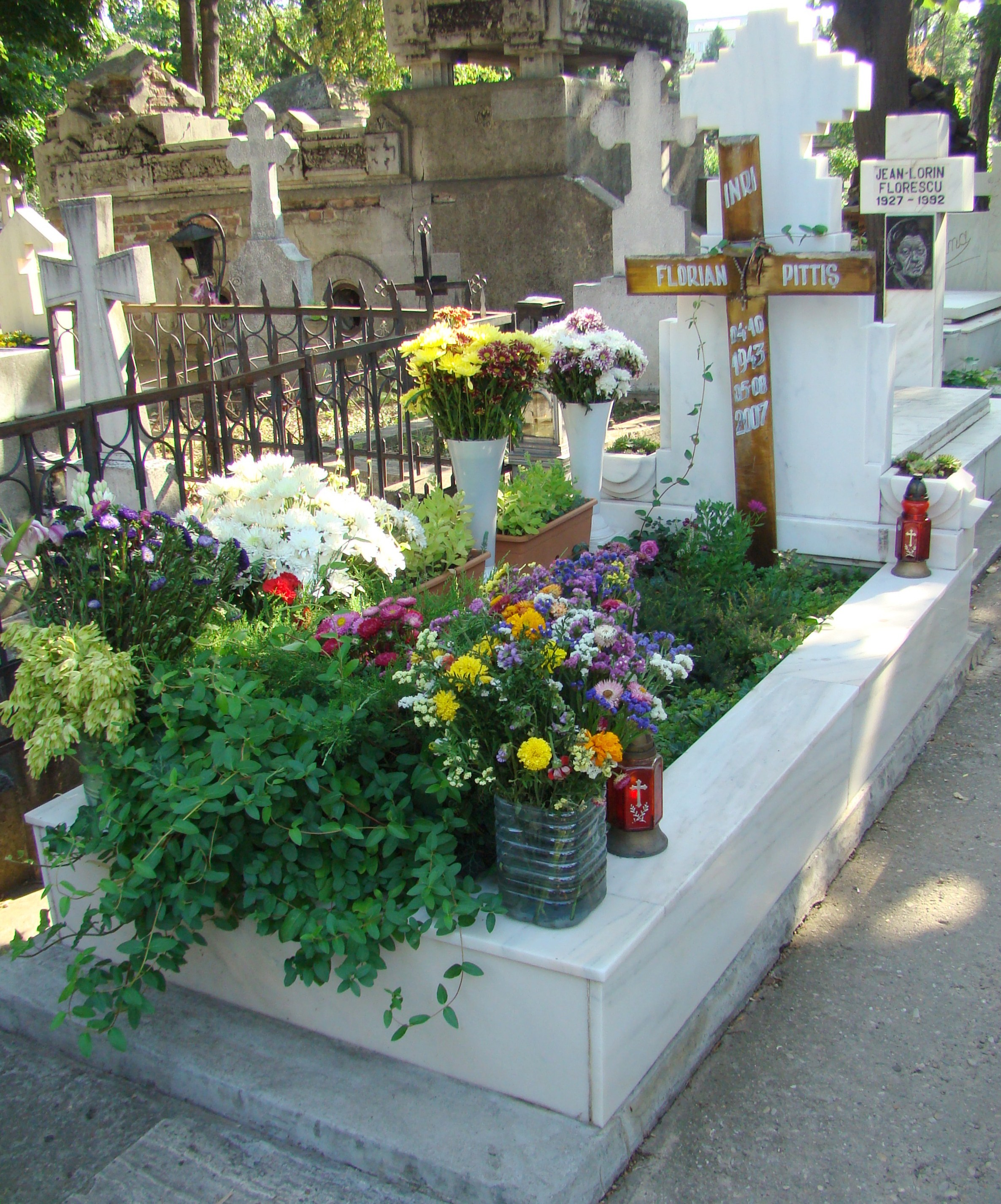
Grave of Pittiș at Bellu Cemetery

On 30 July 2007, Pittiș was admitted in serious condition at the Fundeni Oncology Institute in Bucharest, where he died a week later on 5 August. He was buried by the Actor's Alley in the city's Bellu Cemetery.

== Stage activity ==
- Lucius – Julius Caesar by William Shakespeare, director Andrei Șerban, 1968
- Fleance – Macbeth by William Shakespeare, director Liviu Ciulei, 1968
- Aurel – The End of the World by Victor Eftimiu, director Zoe Anghel Stanca, 1968
- Camille – A Flea in Her Ear by Georges Feydeau, director Emil Mandric, 1969
- Collin Talbo – The Grass Harp by Truman Capote, director Crin Teodorescu, 1970
- Jeremy – Love for Love by William Congreve, director Emil Mandric, 1970
- Arlechino – The Liar by Carlo Goldoni, director Sanda Manu, 1971
- Valentin – Valentin and Valentina by Aleksei Arbuzov, director Adrian Georgescu, 1972
- Feste – Twelfth Night, Or What You Will by William Shakespeare; director Liviu Ciulei, 1973
- Count d'Aubigny – Elizabeth I by Paul Foster, director Liviu Ciulei, 1974
- Alioska – The Lower Depths by Maxim Gorky, director Liviu Ciulei, 1975
- Traian – Titanic Waltz by Tudor Mușatescu, director Toma Caragiu, 1975
- Edmund – Long Day's Journey into Night by Eugene O'Neill, director Liviu Ciulei, 1976
- Parrot – Ma-ma, director Elisabeta Bostan, 1976
- Cricket – Veronica se întoarce, director Elisabeta Bostan, 1973
- King Radu The Handsome – The Cold by Marin Sorescu, director Dan Micu, 1977
- Piotr – The Philistines by Maxim Gorky, director Ioan Taub, 1978
- Ariel – The Tempest by William Shakespeare, director Liviu Ciulei, 1978
- Leonard Brazil – City Sugar by Stephen Poliakoff, director Florian Pittiș, 1980
- Patriciu – Investigation on a Young Man by Adrian Dohotaru, director Petre Popescu, 1980
- King Louis XIV – The Cabal of Hypocrites by Mihail Bulgakov, director Alexandru Tocilescu, 1982
- M. Loyal – Tartuffe by Molière, director Alexandru Tocilescu, 1982
- Laertes – Hamlet by William Shakespeare, director Alexandru Tocilescu, 1985
- Teodoro – The Dog in the Manger by Lope de Vega, director Florian Pittiș, 1988
- Philinte – The Misanthrope by Molière, director Valeriu Moisescu, 1989
- Dr. Frank Bryant – Educating Rita by Willy Russell, director Florian Pittiș, 1989
- Mortimer Brewster – Arsenic and Old Lace by Joseph Kesselring, director Grigore Gonta, 1991
- Sonnenstich – Spring Awakening by Frank Wedekind, director Liviu Ciulei, 1991
- Tiresias – Antigone by Sophocles, director Alexandru Tocilescu, 1993
- Jack – Everything in the Garden by Edward Albee, director Tudor Mărăscu, 1997

== As a director ==
- Facing the World (with Mircea Vintilă), 1979;
- City Sugar – by Stephen Poliakoff, 1980;
- The Dog in the Manger by Lope de Vega, 1988;
- Black and White by Keith Waterhouse and Willis Hall, 1997;
- Educating Rita by Willy Russel, 1989;
- Poezia muzicii tinere – 1981;
- Song of Myself – music show on the poetry of Walt Whitman, 1985.

== Music ==
- Sunt tânăr, Doamnă... (2008);
- Cântece de bivuac (1999);
- Ciripituri (1998);
- În căutarea cuibului pierdut (1996);
- Nu trântiți ușa (Mircea Vintilă and Florian Pittiș), 1992.

== See also ==
- Music of Romania
