= Manuela Hărăbor =

Romanian actress

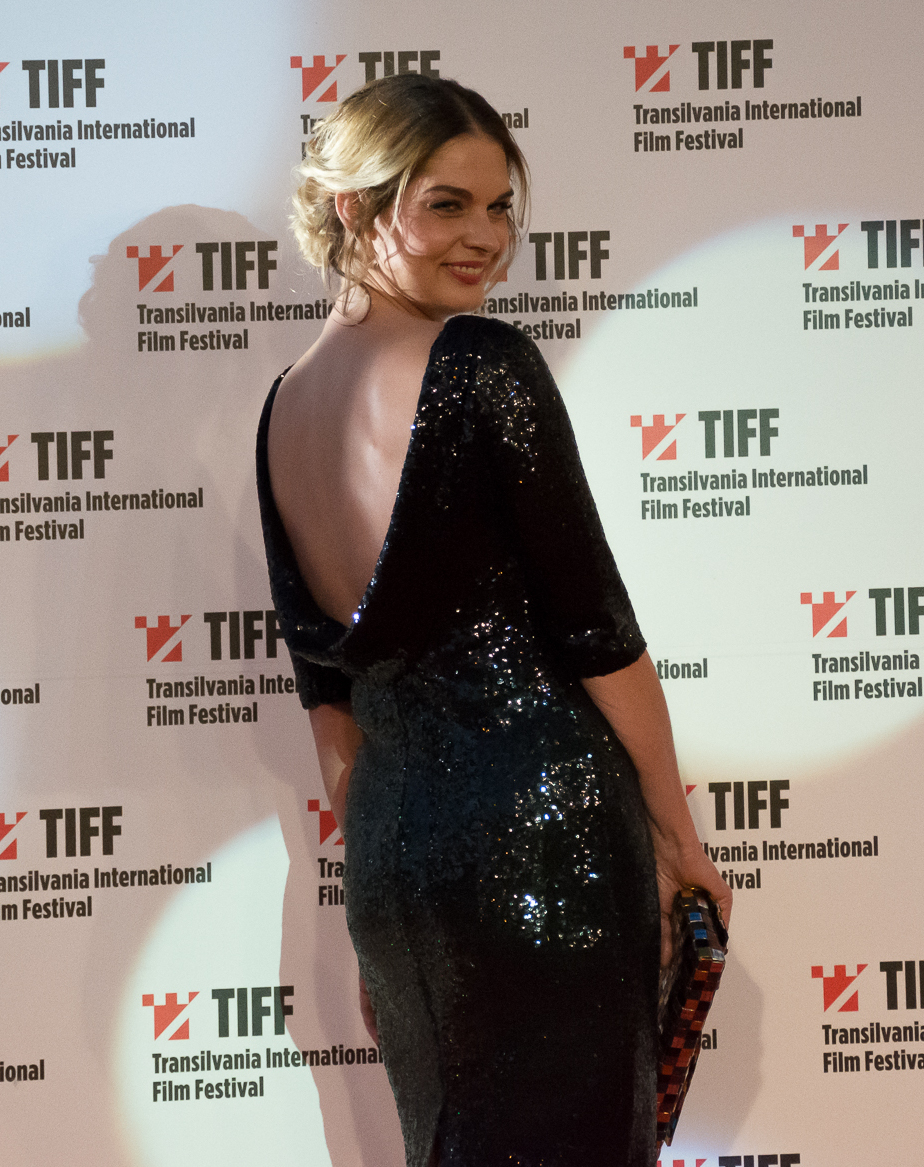
Manuela Hărăbor (2016)

Manuela Hărăbor (born 2 April 1968) is a Romanian actress.

== Biography ==
Born in Bucharest, she debuted in 1972 as a 4-years old girl in the film Veronica. She became popular after playing the role of Simina in the film The Forest Woman (Pădureanca, 1987). Hărăbor graduated from the Bucharest Academy of Theatre and Film in 1991. In 1995 she went to the United States, where she spent 2 years in New York City and 3 years in Miami.

Hărăbor has one son, Andrei (born in 1991), who lives with her.

== Filmography ==
- Veronica (1972)
- Veronica se întoarce (1973)
- Ma-ma (1976)
- Gustul și culoarea fericirii (1978)
- Trenul de aur (1986)
- Pădureanca (1987) – Simina
- Secretul lui Nemesis (1987)
- Martori dispăruți (1988) – Roxana
- Lacrima cerului (1989) – Roxana
- Secretul armei... secrete! (1989) – Frumoasa
- Legenda carpatină (1989)
- Mircea (1989)
- Rochia albă de dantelă (1989)
- Coroana de foc (1990)
- Crucea de piatră (1993) – Ilonka Sabo
- Doi haiduci și o crâșmăriță (1993) – Stana
- Invisible: The Chronicles of Benjamin Knight (1994) – Kidnapped Girl
- Ochii care nu se văd (1994) – Ica
- Meurtres par procuration (TV film, 1995) – Daniela
- Camera ascunsă (2004) – Andreea
- Magnatul (2004)
- Cu un pas înainte (TV series, 2007) – Aurora Tomozei
- Fetele marinarului (TV series, 2009) – Virginia Trifan
- Camp Rock (2009) – Mitchie's mom (Romanian dubbing)
- Hotel of the Damned (2016) – Maria
- Vlad (TV series, 2020) – Hotel director
- Intâlniri apropiate de gradul I (Short film, 2020)
- Rondul de noapte (2021) – Flora
- The New Year That Never Came (2024) – Alina Silvestru
