= Veronica (1972 film) =

1972 film

- Directed by: Elisabeta Bostan
- Starring: Lulu Mihăescu; Margareta Pîslaru; Dem Rădulescu
- Cinematography: Iulius Druckmann
- Release date: 1972
- Running time: 90 minutes
- Country: Romania
- Language: Romanian

Veronica is a 1972 Romanian children's musical film directed by Elisabeta Bostan. It was selected as the Romanian entry for the Best Foreign Language Film at the 46th Academy Awards, but was not accepted as a nominee. It is the first of two films based on La Fontaine's Fables. It established Bostan's reputation as a director in the genre of children's film.

== Cast ==
- Lulu Mihăescu as Veronica
- Margareta Pîslaru as Teacher / Headmistress and The Fairy
- Dem Rădulescu as Dănilă the Tomcat / The Cook
- Vasilica Tastaman as The Vixen
- Angela Moldovan as Smaranda
- George Mihăiță as the mouse Aurică
- Mihai Stan as the Raven
- Vali Niculescu as the mouse Mini-Cranț
- Cornel Patrichi as the Glow worm
- Ștefan Thury
- Manuela Hărăbor as little girl at the orphanage
- Adrian Vîlcu as little boy

== Production ==
For the casting of the children, Bostan stated that she had chosen the actors among 11,000 children.

== Reception ==
The film reached over 3,2 million spectators at the time.

== Screenings ==
The film was screened in Paris in 2007 as part of a Romanian film festival and presented as "the children's musical dear to generations of Romanians".

== See also ==
- List of submissions to the 46th Academy Awards for Best Foreign Language Film
- List of Romanian submissions for the Academy Award for Best Foreign Language Film
