= Dansez pentru tine season 13 =

Dansez pentru tine
- Season 13
- Celebrity winner: Roxana Ionescu
- Professional winner: George Boghian
- No. of episodes: 7

Release
- Original network: Pro TV
- Original release: October 26 – December 7, 2012

Season chronology
- ← Previous; Season 12 Next → Season 14

Dansez pentru tine returned for its thirteenth season on October 26, 2012. Ștefan Bănică, Jr. and Iulia Vântur returned as hosts. The judges are Mihai Petre, Wilmark Rizzo, Emilia Popescu, Beatrice Rancea and Cornel Patrichi was replaced with Edi Stancu.

== Couples ==
The 8 celebrities and professional dancers who competed were:

Celebrity	Occupation	Partner	Result
Marian Drăgulescu	Gymnast	Adriana Lupu	Eliminated 1st on November 2, 2012
Pavel Stratan	Singer	Andreea Preda	Eliminated 2nd on November 9, 2012
Bianca Drăgușanu	Model	Carol Soldea	Eliminated 3rd on November 16, 2012
Șerban Copot	Singer	Valentina Hainăroșie	Eliminated 4th on November 23, 2012
Daniel Dragomir (Max)	Singer	Diana Pop	Eliminated 5th on November 30, 2012
Oana Ioniță	Choreographer	Kovács Ali Stoica	Third place on December 7, 2012
Nicoleta Luciu	Singer and actress	Attila Hainer	Runner-up on December 7, 2012
Roxana Ionescu	TV presenter	George Boghian	Winner on December 7, 2012

== Scoring chart ==
Couple	Place	Wk 1	Wk 2	Wk 3	Wk 4	Wk 5	Wk 6	Wk 7
Roxana & George	1	40.5+41.0=81.5	41.5+39.5=81.0					Winner
Nicoleta & Hainer	2	36.5+36.0=72.5	40.5+41.0=81.5					Runner-up
Oana & Ali	3	41.0+40.5=81.5	46.0+44.0=90.0					Third place
Max & Diana	4	45.0+43.5=88.5	45.0+43.5=88.5					Eliminated (Week 6)
Șerban & Valentina	5	44.5+41.5=86.0	45.0+44.0=89.0				Eliminated (Week 5)	
Bianca & Carol	6	38.0+38.0=76.0	35.5+33.5=69.0			Eliminated (Week 4)		
Pavel & Andreea	7	35.5+33.0=68.5	37.0+39.0=76.0		Eliminated (Week 3)			
Marian & Adriana	8	36.0+34.5=70.5	42.0	Eliminated (Week 2)				

Red numbers indicate the lowest score for each week
Green numbers indicate the highest score for each week
the couple eliminated that week
the returning couple finishing in the bottom two (or three)
the returning couple that was the last to be called safe
the winning couple
the runner-up couple
the third-place couple

== Weekly scores and songs ==
=== Week 1 ===
Running order

Part I (Harap-Alb freestyle)

Couple	Score	Dance	Result
Oana & Ali	41.0 (8,8.5,7.5,8.5,8.5)	Freestyle	None
Marian & Adriana	36.0 (7,7.5,6,8,7.5)	Freestyle	None
Pavel & Andreea	35.5 (7.5,7.5,6,7.5,7)	Freestyle	None
Nicoleta & Hainer	36.5 (8,8,5.5,7.5,7,5)	Freestyle	None
Bianca & Carol	38.0 (8,8.5,6.5,8,7)	Freestyle	None
Șerban & Valentina	44.5 (9,9,9,8.5)	Freestyle	None
Max & Diana	45.0 (9,9,8.5,9.5,9)	Freestyle	None
Monica & George	40.5 (8,8.5,7,9,8)	Freestyle	None

Part II (Waltz)

Couple	Score	Dance	Result
Oana & Ali	40.5	Waltz	Safe
Marian & Adriana	34.5	Waltz	Bottom two
Pavel & Andreea	33.0	Waltz	Bottom two
Nicoleta & Hainer	36.0	Waltz	Safe
Bianca & Carol	38.0	Waltz	Safe
Șerban & Valentina	41.5	Waltz	Safe
Max & Diana	43.5	Waltz	Safe
Monica & George	41.0	Waltz	Safe

=== Week 2 ===
Running order

Part I (Rock 'n' Roll)

Couple	Score	Dance	Result
Max & Diana		Rock 'n' Roll	None
Șerban & Valentina		Rock 'n' Roll	None
Oana & George		Rock 'n' Roll	None
Oana & Ali		Rock 'n' Roll	None
Bianca & Carol		Rock 'n' Roll	None
Nicoleta & Hainer		Rock 'n' Roll	None
Dima & Andreea		Rock 'n' Roll	None
Marian & Adriana	Eliminated	Rock 'n' Roll	None

Part II ()

Couple	Score	Dance	Result
Max & Diana	45.0 (8.5,9.5,8.5,9.5,9)		None
Șerban & Valentina	45.0 (9.5,9.5,8,9.5,8.5)		None
Oana & George	41.5 (9,9,7,9,7.5)		None
Oana & Ali	46.0 (9.5,9.5,9,9.5,8.5)		None
Bianca & Carol	35.5 (7,7.5,6.5,8,6.5)		None
Nicoleta & Hainer	40.5 (7.5,8.5,8,8.5,8)		None
Pavel & Andreea	37.0 (7,7.5,7,8,7.5)		None
Marian & Adriana	42.0 (9,8.5,7.5,9,8)		None

Bottom two

Couple	Result
Pavel & Andreea	Safe
Marian & Adriana	Eliminated

== Dance chart ==
The celebrities and professional partners danced one of these routines for each corresponding week:

- Week 1: Freestyle and Waltz

Couple	Week 1		Week 2	Week 3	Week 4	Week 5	Week 6	Week 7	Week 8
Bianca & Carol	Freestyle	Waltz	Rock 'n' Roll						
Max & Diana	Freestyle	Waltz	Rock 'n' Roll						
Marian & Adriana	Freestyle	Waltz	Rock 'n' Roll						
Roxana & George	Freestyle	Waltz	Rock 'n' Roll						
Nicoleta & Hainer	Freestyle	Waltz	Rock 'n' Roll						
Oana & Ali	Freestyle	Waltz	Rock 'n' Roll						
Pavel & Andreea	Freestyle	Waltz	Rock 'n' Roll						
Șerban & Valentina	Freestyle	Waltz	Rock 'n' Roll						

Highest scoring dance
Lowest scoring dance
Danced, but not scored

== Ratings ==
Ep	Date	National			Urban		
Ep	Date	Average (thousands)	Rating (%)	Peak (thousands)	Average (thousands)	Rating (%)	Peak (thousands)
1	October 26, 2012				2 500	16.8	
