= Dansez pentru tine season 14 =

Dansez pentru tine
- Season 14
- Celebrity winner: Ilinca Vandici
- Professional winner: Răzvan Marton
- No. of episodes: 7

Release
- Original network: Pro TV
- Original release: October 18 – November 29, 2013

Season chronology
- ← Previous; Season 13

Dansez pentru tine (season 14) of Dansez pentru tine premiered on October 18, 2013. Ștefan Bănică, Jr. and Iulia Vântur returned as hosts. The judges are Emilia Popescu, Mihai Petre, Beatrice Rancea, Edi Stancu and Wilmark Rizzo being replaced by Elwira Petre.

The season concluded on November 29, 2013 with Ilinca Vandici & Răzvan Marton as the winners.

== Couples ==
Celebrity	Occupation	Partner	Status
Sorin Brotnei	Singer	Alexandra Popovici	Eliminated 1st on October 25, 2013
Nana Falemi	Retired football player	Emanuela Mitrea	Eliminated 2nd on November 1, 2013
Elena Ionescu	Singer	Adrian Baranga	Eliminated 3rd on November 8, 2013
Giani Kiriţă	Retired football player	Dana Matei	Eliminated 4th on November 15, 2013
Ruby	Singer	Alexandru Ciobanu	Eliminated 5th on November 22, 2013
Dima Trofin	Singer and actor	Iulia Clisu	Third place on November 29, 2013
Sore Mihalache	Singer and actress	George Trascău	Runner-up on November 29, 2013
Ilinca Vandici	Model and TV presenter	Răzvan Marton	Winner on November 29, 2013

== Scoring chart ==
Couple	Place	Week 1	Week 2	Week 3	Week 4	Week 5	Week 6	Week 7
Ilinca & Răzvan	1	86.0	84.5	115.5	90.5	91.0	139.0	
Sore & Dark	2	92.0	91.0	117.5	90.0	96.5	148.0	
Dima & Iulia	3	83.0	91.0	103.0	90.0	96.0	134.5	
Ruby & Alexandru	4	79.5	84.5	105.0	77.5	89.0	130.0	
Giani & Dana	5	81.0	84.0	111.0	82.5	N/A		
Elena & Freek	6	81.0	93.0	104.5	N/A			
Nana & Emanuela	7	81.5	81.5	N/A				
Sorin & Alexandra	8	80.5	79.0					

indicates the couple eliminated that week
indicates the couple finishing in the bottom two
indicates the winning couple
indicates the runner-up couple
indicates the third-place couple
Red numbers the couple(s) with the lowest score for that week
Green numbers the couple(s) with the highest score for that week

== Weekly scores and songs ==
=== Week 1 (October 18) ===
- Ștefan Bănică, Jr.'s performance: "Alerg printre stele" (feat. Pacha Man).

==== First round ====
Couple	Choreograph	Score	Dance	Music
Giani & Dana	Victoria Bucun	40.5 (8.0, 7.5, 8.0, 9.0, 8.0)	Freestyle	"Love on Top" — Beyoncé, "Where the Hood At?" — DMX
Sore & Dark	Bogdan Boantă	46.5 (9.5, 9.0, 9.5, 9.5, 9.0)	Freestyle	"Impossible" — James Arthur
Sorin & Alexandra	Georgiana Caita	39.5 (8.0, 7.5, 8.5, 8.0, 7.5)	Freestyle	"Je veux" — Zaz
Dima & Iulia	Dragoş Roşu	43.5 (9.0, 8.0, 9.0, 9.5, 8.0)	Freestyle	"Settle Down" — Kimbra
Elena & Freek	Andra Gheorghe	40.0 (8.0, 8.0, 8.0, 8.5, 7.5)	Freestyle	"Elements" — Lindsey Stirling
Ilinca & Răzvan	Daniel Dobre	41.5 (8.5, 8.0, 9.0, 8.0, 8.0)	Freestyle	"Blurred Lines" — Robin Thicke feat. T.I. and Pharrell
Ruby & Alexandru	Doina Botiş	40.5 (8.5, 7.5, 8.5, 8.5, 7.5)	Freestyle	"Chambermaid Swing" — Parov Stelar
Nana & Emanuela	Lilian Carăuş	41.5 (8.5, 7.0, 9.5, 8.5, 8.0)	Freestyle	"Bohemian Rhapsody" — Queen, "Clarity" — Zedd feat. Foxes

==== Second round ====
Couple	Choreograph	Score	Dance	Music
Giani & Dana	Victoria Bucun	40.5 (8.0, 9.0, 7.0, 8.5, 8.0)	Waltz	
Sore & Dark	Bogdan Boantă	45.5 (9.0, 9.0, 9.0, 9.5, 9.0)	Waltz	"Nights in White Satin" — The Moody Blues
Sorin & Alexandra	Georgiana Caita	41.0 (8.0, 8.5, 8.0, 7.5, 9.0)	Waltz	"A Thousand Years" — Christina Perri
Dima & Iulia	Dragoş Roşu	39.5 (7.5, 8.0, 7.0, 8.5, 8.5)	Waltz	"Army Dreamers" — Kate Bush
Elena & Freek	Andra Gheorghe	41.0 (8.0, 8.5, 7.5, 8.5, 8.5)	Waltz	"Iris" — Goo Goo Dolls
Ilinca & Răzvan	Daniel Dobre	44.5 (9.0, 9.0, 8.5, 9.0, 9.0)	Waltz	"Les Valses de Vienne" — François Feldman
Ruby & Alexandru	Doina Botiş	39.0 (7.5, 8.5, 6.5, 8.5, 8.0)	Waltz	
Nana & Emanuela	Lilian Carăuş	40.0 (8.0, 9.0, 7.0, 8.0, 8.0)	Waltz	"The Time of My Life" — David Cook

==== Results ====
Couple	1st Round	2nd Round	Total	Result
Sore & Dark	46.5	45.5	92.0	1st
Ilinca & Răzvan	41.5	44.5	86.0	2nd
Dima & Iulia	43.5	39.5	83.0	3rd
Nana & Emanuela	41.5	40.0	81.5	4th
Giani & Dana	40.5	40.5	81.0	5th/6th
Elena & Freek	40.0	41.0	81.0	5th/6th
Sorin & Alexandra	39.5	41.0	80.5	Bottom two
Ruby & Alexandru	40.5	39.0	79.5	Bottom two

=== Week 2 (October 25) ===
- The juries decided that Lilian Carăuş will be the choreograph of Elena & Freek and Andra Gheorghe will now team with Nana & Emanuela.
- Ștefan Bănică, Jr.'s performance: "Super-fata, cea cu vino-ncoa (cantecul tocilarului)".
- Guest : Antonia.

==== First round ====
- the contestants choose their type of dance through a draw

Couple	Choreograph	Score	Dance	Music
Sore & Dark	Bogdan Boantă	42.5 (9.0, 8.0, 8.5, 9.0, 8.0)	Reggaeton ^{1}	"Watch Out for This (Bumaye)" — Major Lazer
Ilinca & Răzvan	Daniel Dobre	41.0 (9.5, 7.5, 9.0, 8.0, 7.0)	International folk	
Sorin & Alexandra	Georgiana Caita	38.5 (8.0, 7.0, 8.0, 8.0, 7.5)	Rock and Roll	"Are You Gonna Be My Girl" — Jet
Ruby & Alexandru	Doina Botiş	40.5 (8.5, 7.5, 8.5, 8.5, 7.5)	Cabaret	"What's a Girl Gotta Do" — Basement Jaxx feat. Paloma Faith
Dima & Iulia	Dragoş Roşu	46.0 (9.5, 8.5, 9.5, 9.5, 9.0)	Bollywood	"Sexy Taxi Song" — Shahid Nawaz
Nana & Emanuela	Andra Gheorghe	41.5 (8.5, 7.5, 9.0, 8.5, 8.0)	Tango	"Tango de los exiliados" — Vanessa-Mae
Giani & Dana	Victoria Bucun	44.5 (9.5, 8.0, 9.0, 9.0, 9.0)	Gypsy dance	
Elena & Freek	Lilian Carăuş	47.0 (10, 8.5, 9.5, 9.5, 9.5)	Salsa	"Friday Night Rhythm" — Angel & The Mambokats

Notes

1. Being first place in the previous edition, the contestants choose their dance without a draw.

==== Duel ====
Couple	Choreograph	Score	Music
Sorin & Alexandra	Georgiana Caita	40.5 (8.0, 8.0, 8.5, 8.0, 8.0)	"Ți-am promis" — Akcent
Ruby & Alexandru	Doina Botiş	44.0 (9.5, 8.5, 8.5, 9.0, 8.5)	"Stinge lumina" — Ruby

==== Second round ====
Couple	Choreograph	Score	Dance	Music
Sore & Dark	Bogdan Boantă	48.5 (9.5, 10, 9.5, 9.5, 10)	Vogue	"End of Time" — Beyoncé, "Where Have You Been" — Rihanna, "Wannabe" — Spice Girls
Ilinca & Răzvan	Daniel Dobre	43.5 (8.5, 9.5, 8.0, 9.5, 8.0)	Vogue	"Talk Dirty" — Jason Derulo feat. 2 Chainz
Dima & Iulia	Dragoş Roşu	45.0 (9.0, 9.5, 8.5, 9.0, 9.0)	Vogue	
Nana & Emanuela	Andra Gheorghe	40.0 (8.0, 8.0, 7.5, 8.0, 8.5)	Vogue	"Bobblehead" — Christina Aguilera
Giani & Dana	Victoria Bucun	39.5 (8.0, 8.0, 7.5, 8.0, 8.0)	Vogue	"I Like the Way" — BodyRockers
Elena & Freek	Lilian Carăuş	46.0 (9.0, 9.0, 9.0, 9.5, 9.5)	Vogue	"A Little Party Never Killed Nobody (All We Got)" — Fergie, Q-Tip feat. GoonRock

==== Results ====
Couple	1st Round	2nd Round	Total	Result
Elena & Freek	47.0	46.0	93.0	1st
Sore & Dark	42.5	48.5	91.0	2nd/3rd
Dima & Iulia	46.0	45.0	91.0	2nd/3rd
Ilinca & Răzvan	41.0	43.5	84.5	4th/5th
Ruby & Alexandru	40.5	44.0	84.5	4th/5th
Giani & Dana	44.5	39.5	84.0	Bottom two
Nana & Emanuela	41.5	40.0	81.5	Bottom two
Sorin & Alexandra	38.5	40.5	79.0	Eliminated

=== Week 3 (November 1) ===
- The juries decided that Georgiana Căiţa will be the choreograph of Ilinca & Răzvan.
- Ștefan Bănică, Jr.'s performance: "It's Only Rock 'n Roll"
- Guest : Mihaela Rădulescu

==== First round ====
Couple	Choreograph	Score	Dance	Dance Name
Elena & Freek	Lilian Carăuş	52.5 (9.0, 8.0, 9.0, 9.0, 9.0, 8.5)	Folk	Breaza
Dima & Iulia	Dragoş Roşu	53.0 (9.0, 8.5, 9.0, 9.0, 8.5, 9.0)	Folk	Ţărănească
Ruby & Alexandru	Doina Botiş	52.0 (9.5, 8.5, 9.0, 8.5, 8.5, 8.0)	Folk	Vlăscencuţa
Sore & Dark	Bogdan Boantă	59.0 (10, 9.5, 10, 10, 9.5, 10)	Folk	Sucitoarele
Giani & Dana	Victoria Bucun	53.0 (9.0, 8.5, 9.5, 9.0, 8.5, 8.5)	Folk	Hora pe bătaie
Nana & Emanuela	Andra Gheorghe	54.0 (9.0, 8.5, 10, 9.0, 8.5, 9.0)	Folk	Oşenesc
Ilinca & Răzvan	Georgiana Căiţa	59.5 (10, 9.5, 10, 10, 10, 10)	Folk	Ponturi şi invartite

==== Second round ====
- the contestants choose their type of dance through a draw

Couple	Choreograph	Score	Dance	Music
Elena & Freek	Lilian Carăuş	52.0	Michael Jackson ^{2}	"Ghosts", "Dangerous" — Michael Jackson
Dima & Iulia	Dragoş Roşu	50.0	Tango	"Ce faci astă seara tu?","Tangoul","Zaraza","S-a rupt o coardă la vioară"—Margareta Pâslaru
Ruby & Alexandru	Doina Botiş	53.0	Charleston	
Sore & Dark	Bogdan Boantă	58.5	Contemporary	"Wrecking Ball" — Alonzo Holt feat. James Arthur
Ilinca & Răzvan	Georgiana Căiţa	56.0	Reggaeton	

Notes

2. Being first place in the previous edition, the team didn't have to choose their type of dance through a draw.

==== Results ====
Couple	1st Round	2nd Round	Total	Result
Sore & Dark	59.0	58.5	117.5	1st
Ilinca & Răzvan	59.5	56.0	115.5	2nd
Giani & Dana	53.0	58.0	111.0	3rd
Ruby & Alexandru	52.0	53.0	105.0	4th
Elena & Freek	52.5	52.0	104.5	Bottom two
Dima & Iulia	53.0	50.0	103.0	Bottom two
Nana & Emanuela	54.0	N/A	N/A	Eliminated

=== Week 4 (November 8) ===
- Ștefan Bănică, Jr.'s performance: "Dragostea Doare"
- Guests : The Cheeky Girls.

==== First round ====
- the contestants choose their type of dance through a draw

Couple	Choreograph	Score	Dance	Music
Sore & Dark	Bogdan Boantă	43.0 (8.5, 8.0, 8.0, 9.5, 9.0)	Paso doble ^{3}	"He's a Pirate" — Hans Zimmer
Ilinca & Răzvan	Georgiana Căiţa	46.0 (9.0, 9.5, 8.5, 10, 9.0)	Quickstep	"Jumpin' Jack" — Big Bad Voodoo Daddy
Giani & Dana	Victoria Bucun	37.0 (7.5, 7.5, 6.0, 8.0, 8.0)	Rumba	"Cuando Pienso En Ti" — José Feliciano
Ruby & Alexandru	Doina Botiş	38.5 (8.0, 7.0, 7.0, 8.0, 8.5)	Waltz	"If You Don't Know Me by Now — Simply Red

Notes

3. Being first place in the previous edition, the team didn't have to choose their type of dance through a draw.

==== Duel ====
Couple	Choreograph	Score	Music
Dima & Iulia	Dragoş Roşu	44.0 (8.5, 9.5, 8.0, 9.0, 9.0)	"Oliver Twist" — D'banj, "Dincolo de cuvinte" — Smiley and Alex Velea
Elena & Freek	Lilian Carăuş	N/A	"One Love" — Justin Bieber, "Muevete" — Mandinga, "Dincolo de cuvinte" — Smiley and Alex Velea

==== Second round ====
Couple	Choreograph	Score	Dance	Music
Sore & Dark	Bogdan Boantă	47.0 (9.5, 9.0, 9.5, 9.5, 9.5)	Contemporary in the Rain	"Acasă" — Smiley
Ilinca & Răzvan	Georgiana Căiţa	44.5 (9.0, 8.5, 9.0, 9.0, 9.0)	Contemporary in the Rain	
Dima & Iulia	Dragoş Roşu	46.0 (9.5, 8.5, 9.5, 9.5, 9.0)	Contemporary in the Rain	"Tessellate" — Ellie Goulding, Alt-J
Elena & Freek	Lilian Carăuş	45.5 (9.5, 7.5, 10, 9.0, 9.5)	Contemporary in the Rain	"Orpheus in the Underworld" — Jacques Offenbach
Giani & Dana	Victoria Bucun	45.5 (9.0, 8.0, 9.5, 9.5, 9.5)	Contemporary in the Rain	
Ruby & Alexandru	Doina Botiş	39.0 (8.0, 7.0, 8.0, 8.0, 8.0)	Contemporary in the Rain	"After The Rain" — Little Dragon

==== Results ====
Couple	1st Round	2nd Round	Total	Result
Ilinca & Răzvan	46.0	44.5	90.5	1st
Dima & Iulia	44.0	46.0	90.0	2nd/3rd
Sore & Dark	43.0	47.0	90.0	2nd/3rd
Giani & Dana	37.0	45.5	82.5	Bottom two
Ruby & Alexandru	38.5	39.0	77.5	Bottom two
Elena & Freek	N/A	45.5	N/A	Eliminated

=== Week 5 (November 15) ===
- Ștefan Bănică, Jr.'s performance: "Până la capăt"
- Guest : Oana Roman.

==== First round ====
- the contestants choose their type of dance through a draw

Couple	Choreograph	Score	Dance	Music
Ilinca & Răzvan	Georgiana Căiţa	44.0 (8.5, 9.5, 8.0, 9.0, 9.0)	Gypsy dance ^{4}	"Duj Sandale" — Ktolo Patolo
Dima & Iulia	Dragoş Roşu	47.5 (9.5, 9.5, 9.0, 10, 9.5)	Bellydance	
Sore & Dark	Bogdan Boantă	46.5 (9.0, 10, 8.5, 9.5, 9.5)	Cabaret	"Be Italian" — Fergie

Notes

4. Being first place in the previous edition, the team didn't have to choose their type of dance through a draw.

==== Duel ====
Couple	Choreograph	Score	Music
Ruby & Alexandru	Doina Botiş	44.5 (9.5, 10, 8.0, 9.0, 8.0)	"Do It like a Dude" — Jessie J, "Don't You Worry Child" — Swedish House Mafia, "I Believe I Can Fly" — R. Kelly
Giani & Dana	Victoria Bucun	N/A	"Man in the Mirror" — Michael Jackson, "I Believe I Can Fly" — R. Kelly

==== Second round ====
Couple	Choreograph	Score	Dance	Music
Sore & Dark	Bogdan Boantă	50.0 (10, 10, 10, 10, 10)	Videoclip	"Single Ladies (Put a Ring on It)" — Beyoncé Knowles
Ilinca & Răzvan	Georgiana Căiţa	47.0 (9.5, 9.0, 10, 9.0, 9.5)	Videoclip	"Parachute — Cheryl Cole
Giani & Dana	Victoria Bucun	50.0 (10, 10, 10, 10, 10)	Videoclip	"Try" — P!nk
Ruby & Alexandru	Doina Botiş	44.5 (9.0, 8.0, 9.0, 9.5, 9.0)	Videoclip	"Naughty Girl" — Beyoncé Knowles
Dima & Iulia	Dragoş Roşu	48.5 (10, 9.0, 10, 10, 9.5)	Videoclip	"Livin' la Vida Loca" — Ricky Martin

==== Results ====
Couple	1st Round	2nd Round	Total	Result
Sore & Dark	46.5	50.0	96.5	1st
Dima & Iulia	47.5	48.5	96.0	2nd
Ilinca & Răzvan	44.0	47.0	91.0	Bottom two
Ruby & Alexandru	44.5	44.5	89.0	Bottom two
Giani & Dana	N/A	50.0	N/A	Eliminated

=== Week 6 (November 22) ===
- Ștefan Bănică, Jr.'s performance: "Ce e dragostea?".
- Guests : Gina Pistol, Jojo, Laura Cosoi and Bruno Icobet.

==== First round ====
Couple	Choreograph	Score	Dance	Music
Ilinca & Răzvan	Georgiana Căiţa	46.0 (9.5, 9.0, 9.5, 9.0, 9.0)	Merengue	"La Dueña Del Swing" — Los Hermanos Rosario
Ruby & Alexandru	Doina Botiş	43.5 (9.0, 8.0, 9.0, 8.5, 9.0)	Lyrical dance	
Dima & Iulia	Dragoş Roşu	44.0 (8.5, 9.0, 9.0, 8.5, 9.0)	Mambo	"Mambo Gozon" — Tito Puente
Sore & Dark	Bogdan Boantă	50.0 (10, 10, 10, 10, 10)	Lyrical dance	"Gravity" — Sara Bareilles

==== Duel ====
Couple	Choreograph	Score	Music
Ilinca & Răzvan	Georgiana Căiţa	45.0 (9.5, 8.0, 10, 8.5, 9.0)	"Skinny Love" — Birdy
Ruby & Alexandru	Doina Botiş	45.5 (9.0, 9.0, 9.5, 9.0, 9.0)	"Fix You" — Coldplay

==== Second round ====
Couple	Choreograph	Score	Dance	Music
Dima & Iulia	Dragoş Roşu	45.5 (9.0, 8.5, 9.5, 9.5, 9.0)	Lyrical dance	"P.O.H.U.I" — Carla's Dreams feat. Inna
Sore & Dark	Bogdan Boantă	48.0 (10, 9.0, 10, 9.5, 9.5)	Salsa	"Arranca" — Manzanita
Ilinca & Răzvan	Georgiana Căiţa	48.0 (9.5, 9.0, 10, 9.5, 10)	Lyrical dance	

==== Third round ====
Couple	Choreograph	Score	Dance	Music
Ruby & Alexandru	Doina Botiş	41.0 (8.5, 7.0, 8.5, 8.5, 8.5)	Street dance	"Suit & Tie" — Justin Timberlake feat. Jay-Z
Sore & Dark	Bogdan Boantă	50.0 (10, 10, 10, 10, 10)	Street dance	"Cry Me a River" — Justin Timberlake
Dima & Iulia	Dragoş Roşu	45.0 (9.0, 8.5, 9.0, 9.5, 9.0)	Street dance	"Maidanez" — Puya, Doddy, Posset, Mahia & Alex Velea

==== Results ====
Couple	1st Round	2nd Round	3rd Round	Total	Result
Sore & Dark	50.0	48.0	50.0	148.0	1st
Ilinca & Răzvan	46.0	48.0	45.0	139.0	2nd
Dima & Iulia	44.0	45.5	45.0	134.5	3rd
Ruby & Alexandru	43.5	45.5	41.0	130.0	Eliminated

=== Week 7 (November 29) ===
- Ștefan Bănică, Jr.'s performance: TBA
- Guest : Catrinel Menghia, Alexandra Dinu & George Ogararu

== Reception ==
Ep. #	Episode	Airdate	Viewers (millions)	Rating/share (18–49)	Rating/share (Urban)	Rank (timeslot)	Rank (night)	Source
1	Week 1	October 18	—N/a					
2	Week 2	October 25	2.4	8.1	7.5	1	1	
3	Week 3	November 1	2.5	7.7	8.0	1	1	
4	Week 4	November 8	2.3	7.1	7.4	1	1	
5	Week 5	November 15	1.1	5.9	5.5	2	2	
6	Week 6 – Semi-final	November 22	1.9	9.1	9.6	1	1	
7	Week 7 – Final	November 29						
