= Dansez pentru tine =

- Presented by: Ștefan Bănică, Jr. Iulia Vântur (season 3-14); Olivia Steer (season 1-3)
- Judges: Mihai Petre; Emilia Popescu; Beatrice Rancea (2-14); Edi Stancu (13-14); Wilmark (1-13); Elwira Petre (14); Răzvan Mazilu (1-2)
- Country of origin: Romania
- Original language: Romanian
- No. of seasons: 14

Production
- Running time: ~ 210 minutes
- Production company: BBC

Original release
- Network: PRO TV
- Release: 24 March 2006 – present

Dansez pentru tine (English: Dancing for you) is a show produced and broadcast on television station Pro TV, presented by Ștefan Bănică, Jr. and Iulia Vântur, now broadcast on Pro TV. It was the most watched entertainment show in Romania in recent years as audiences (17 shows aired in 2008 recorded an average audience of 7.7%). It was the Romanian version of the British reality TV competition Strictly Come Dancing and is part of the Dancing with the Stars franchise.

== Judges ==
- Mihai Petre
- Emilia Popescu
- Elwira Petre
- Beatrice Rancea
- Edi Stancu
- Mariana Bitang
- Octavian Bellu
- Răzvan Mazilu
- Cornel Patrichi
- Willmark

== Former hosts ==
- Olivia Steer

== Main series results ==
Series	Premiere date	Finale date	Number of stars	Number of weeks	Honour places		
Series	Premiere date	Finale date	Number of stars	Number of weeks	Winner	Second place	Third place
1	24 March 2006	8 May 2006	8	8	Andra & Florin Birică	Arsenie Toderaș & Aliona Munteanu	Cristina Rus & Bogdan Negrea
2	13 October 2006	24 November 2006	8	8	Victor Slav & Carmen Stepan	Smiley & Adriela Morar	Elena Gheorghe & Cornel Ogrean
3	16 March 2007	3 May 2007	8	8	Cosmin Stan & Doina Ocu	Laura Cosoi & Bogdan Boantă	Andreea Bălan & Petrișor Ruge
4	19 October 2007	30 November 2007	8	8	Alex Velea & Cristina Stoicescu	CRBL & Marieta Săbiescu	Dan Bordeianu & Mirela Tiron
5	14 March 2008	2 May 2008	8	8	Andreea Bălan & Petrișor Ruge	Smiley & Adriela Morar	Laura Cosoi & Bogdan Boantă
6	17 October 2008	28 November 2008	8	8	Giulia Anghelescu & Andrei Ștefan	Alina Dumitru & Denis Bolborea	Pavel Bartoș & Luciana Muntean
7	20 March 2009	1 May 2009	8	8	Monica Irimia & Darius Belu	Alin Oprea & Roxana Mihaela Al-Sanadi	Piticu & Oana Dedeu
8	23 October 2009	4 December 2009	8	8	Jean de la Craiova & Sandra Neacșu	Liviu Vârciu & Ilaria Cherloabă	Alina Chinie & Ștefan Bamboi
9	19 March 2010	7 May 2010	8	8	Cătălin Moroșanu & Magdalena Ciorobea	Iuliana Luciu & Grigore Moldovan	Andreea Spătaru & Antonio Martins dos Santos
10	15 October 2010	2 December 2010	8	8	Octavian Strunilă & Ella Dumitru	Adela Popescu & Alexandru Lică	Paula Seling & Tudor Moldoveanu
11	15 April 2011	27 May 2011	8	8	Corina Bud & Eduard Vasile	Lavinia Pârva & Decebal Negoiță	Roxana Ionescu & Ștefan Rebeja
12	21 October 2011	2 December 2011	8	8	Jojo & Ionuț Tănase	Catrinel Sandu & Ionuț Ionescu	Pepe & Andreea Toma
13	26 October 2012	8 December 2012	8	8	Roxana Ionescu & George Boghian	Nicoleta Luciu & Attila Hainer	Oana Ioniță & Kovács Ali Stoica
14	18 October 2013	29 November 2013	8	8	Ilinca Vandici & Răzvan Marton	Sore (singer) & George Trașcău (Dark)	Dima Trofim & Iulia Clisu

== Overall ratings summary ==
The first episode was a big success for the ratings. Pro TV not only managed to have the biggest audience during the show, but managed to make Dansez pentru tine (Dancing with the Stars) the most viewed television show since 2006 to 2013 in Romania, with more than 120 editions.

Season	Timeslot (EEST)	Season premiere	Premiere viewers (in millions)	Season finale	Finale viewers (in millions)	TV season	Rank
1	Friday 8:30 P.M.	24 March 2006	2.02	8 May 2006	2.5	2006	#1
2	Friday 8:30 P.M.	13 October 2006	2.03	24 November 2006	2.7	2006	#1
3	Friday 8:30 P.M.	16 March 2007	1.3	3 May 2007	2.0	2007	#1
4	Friday 8:30 P.M.	19 October 2007	1.09	30 November 2007	2.07	2007	#1
5	Friday 8:30 P.M.	14 March 2008	1.5	2 May 2008	1.03	2008	#1
6	Friday 8:30 P.M.	17 October 2008	1.5	28 November 2008	2.60	2008	#1
7	Friday 8:30 P.M.	20 March 2009	1.7	1 May 2009	2.00	2009	#1
8	Friday 8:30 P.M.	23 October 2009	1,07	4 December 2009	3.03	2009	#1
9	Friday 8:30 P.M.	19 March 2010	1,9	7 May 2010	2.5	2010	#1
10	Friday 8:30 P.M.	15 October 2010	2,00	2 December 2010	2.9	2010	#1
11	Friday 8:30 P.M.	15 April 2011	2,7	27 May 2011	1.9	2011	#1
12	Friday 8:30 P.M.	21 October 2011	829.000	2 December 2011	1.9	2011	#1
13	Friday 8:30 P.M.	26 October 2012	2,5	8 December 2012	2.5	2012	#1
14	Friday 8:30 P.M.	18 October 2013	2,9	29 November 2013	1,36	2013	#1
