= Poveste de cartier =

2008 film by Theodor Halacu-Nicon

- Film poster
- Directed by: Theodor Halacu-Nicon
- Written by: Denis Dinulescu; Maria Manolescu
- Produced by: Călin Furtunescu; Valentin Rupiță
- Starring: Sorinel Copilul de Aur; Monica Merișan; Augustin Viziru; Octavian Strunilă; Florin Călinescu; Romică Țociu; Cornel Palade; Ion Besoiu; Violeta Andrei; Sergiu Nicolaescu; Constantin Dinulescu (actor); Paul Chiribuță; Vali Rupiță; Radu Rupiță; Jean de la Craiova
- Music by: Dan Bursuc
- Release date: May 9, 2008 (Romania)
- Running time: 91 minutes
- Country: Romania
- Language: Romanian

Poveste de cartier (English: "Neighborhood story") is a 2008 Romanian musical romantic drama film directed by Theodor Halacu-Nicon. It stars Sorinel Copilul de Aur, Monica Merișan, Augustin Viziru, Octavian Strunilă, Florin Călinescu, Violeta Andrei, Ion Besoiu, Romică Țociu and Cornel Palade. Inspired by West Side Story, it tells the love story of Vio (Copilul de Aur) and Ramona (Merișan) who are members of two rival gangs in Pantelimon, Bucharest. The music of Poveste de cartier was composed by Dan Bursuc and belongs to the manele genre.

== Cast ==
- Sorinel Copilul de Aur - Vio
- Monica Merișan - Ramona
- Augustin Viziru - Nic
- Octavian Strunilă - Calu
- Florin Călinescu - Davinci
- Romică Țociu - Italianu
- Cornel Palade - Vrăjitoru
- Ion Besoiu - Nea Petrică
- Violeta Andrei - Venezuela
- Sergiu Nicolaescu - Aristide
- Constantin Dinulescu - Mayor
- Paul Chiribuță - Englezu
- Vali Rupiță - Davinci's gorilla
- Virgil Constantin - Titi Doinaș
- Emilia Dobrin - Tatiana Doinaș
- Andreea Doinea - Marcela
- Adriana Nicolae - Paula
- Alexandru Lulescu - Nea Mielu
