= Violeta Andrei =

Romanian actress

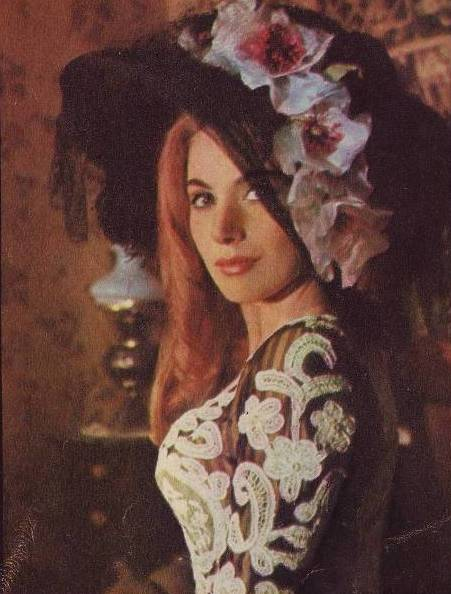
- Born: 29 March 1941 (age 85); Brașov, Kingdom of Romania
- Education: Caragiale Academy of Theatrical Arts and Cinematography
- Occupation: Actress
- Years active: 1966–2006
- Spouse: Ștefan Andrei (m. 1961; died 2014)

Violeta Andrei (Romanian pronunciation: [vi.oˈleta anˈdrej]; born 29 March 1941) is a Romanian theater and film actress.

== Biography ==
Andrei was born on 29 March 1941 in Brașov, Romania. After completing high school at the Școala Centrală National College in Bucharest, she graduated from the Caragiale National University of Theatre and Film in 1965. Her theater debut was at Teatrul Giulești (now the Odeon Theatre). She played in several roles at the Bulandra Theatre in Bucharest, until 1990.

She made her film debut in the movie Golgota (1966), after which she acted in 60 Romanian films.

She is the widow of former Minister of Foreign Affairs of Romania Ștefan Andrei. They have a son, Călin Andrei.

== Selected filmography ==
- Golgota (1966)
- Felix and Otilia (1972)
- Tonight We'll Dance at Home (1972)
- Veronica se întoarce (1973)
- Dincolo de nisipuri (1974)
- Trei scrisori secrete (1974)
- Stephen the Great - Vaslui 1475 (1975)
- Nu filmăm să ne-amuzăm (1975)
- Casa de la miezul nopții (1976)
- Ma-ma (1976 film) (1976)
- Aurel Vlaicu (1977), as Elena Caragiani-Stoenescu
- Eu, tu, și... Ovidiu (1978)
- The Moment (1979)
- The Pale Light of Sorrow (1981)
- Păcatele Evei (2005)
- Poveste de cartier (2008) as Venezuela Stănescu, Davinci's wife

== See also ==
- List of Romanian actresses
- Cinema of Romania
