= Gheorghe Sencovici =

Romanian sports shooter

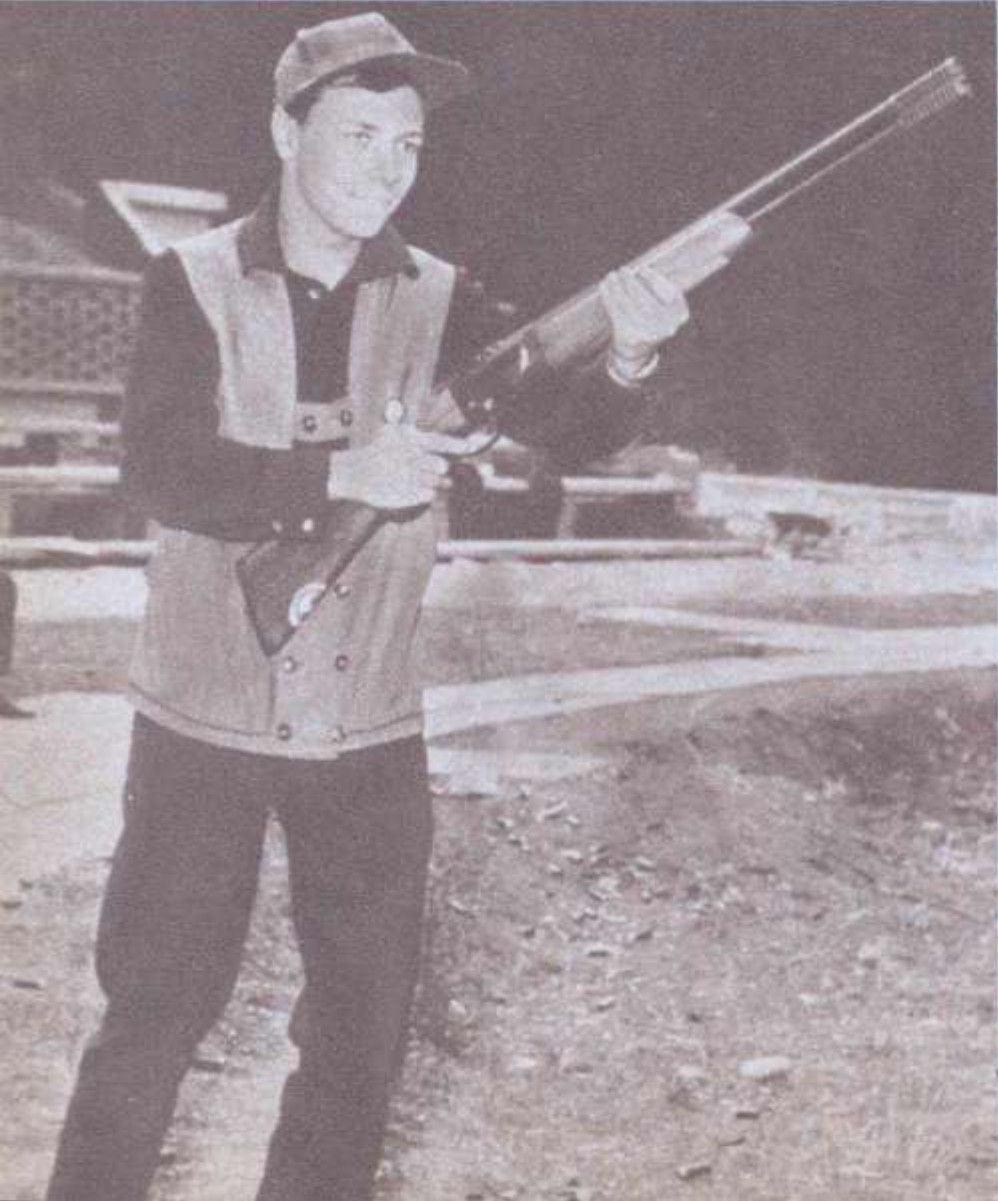

Personal information
- Born: 1 July 1945 Bucharest, Romania
- Died: 9 May 2006 (aged 60) United States

Sport
- Sport: Sports shooting

Gheorghe Sencovici (1 July 1945 – 9 May 2006) was a Romanian former sports shooter. He competed in the skeet event at the 1968 Summer Olympics. He was married to the singer Margareta Pâslaru. The couple left Romania with their daughter in 1983 and resided in Summit, New Jersey ever since.
