= George Mihăiță =

Romanian actor, director and philanthropist

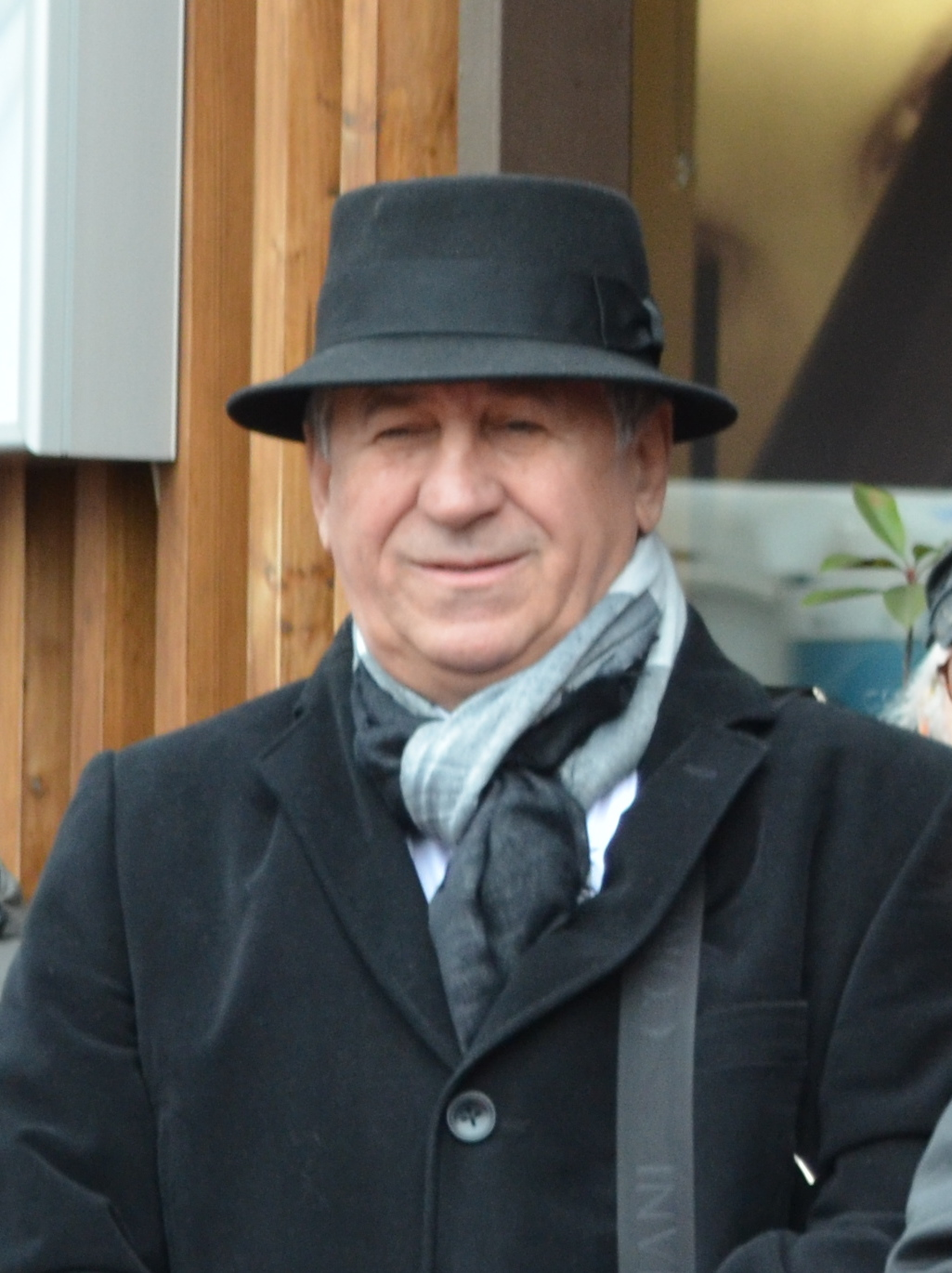
- George Mihăiță (in December 2011)
- Born: Gheorghe Mihăiță; 23 September 1948; Moreni, Romania
- Education: Institute of Theatrical Art and Cinematography
- Occupation: Actor
- Years active: 1968–present
- Spouse: Delia Seceleanu
- Children: Andrei Mihăiță Tudor Mihăiță Vlad Mihăiță
- Awards: National Order of Faithful Service, Grand Cross

George Mihăiță (Romanian pronunciation: [ˈdʒe̯ordʒe mihəˈitsə]; born 23 September 1948 in Moreni) is a Romanian actor, director and philanthropist. Renowned for his distinctive voice, Mihăiță has appeared in over 70 films and is regarded as a Romanian film icon.

He studied in the Institute of Theatrical Art and Cinematography of Bucharest, now known as the Caragiale National University of Theatre and Film, and graduated with honors. He has worked as an actor for more than forty years, both in cinema and theater. He is the renovator of teenagers education in Romania.

The Director of Salut magazine and Salut Generation Pro, two editorials that made history among the Romanian newspapers, Mihăiţă also was named the honorific director of Super Magazine. George is the founder of the teenager's day. He is also the President of UNESCO Club for teenagers and during the last six years he has been the director of The Comedy Theater in Bucharest. Also was the founder and director of FESTCO - The Festival of Romanian Comedy in Bucharest.

== Filmography ==
- The Reenactment director Lucian Pintilie, 1968
- The Warmth director Șerban Creangă, 1969
- Voiceless Friends directors Paul Fritz Nemeth, Gheorghe Turcu, 1969
- The Castle of the Doomed director Mihai Iacob, 1970
- The Miscellaneous Brigade on the Watch director Mircea Drăgan, 1971
- Veronica director Elisabeta Bostan, 1972
- The Trap director Manole Marcus, 1973
- Veronica Comes Back Elisabeta Bostan, 1973
- Philip the Kind director Dan Pița, 1974
- Picture Postcards with Wild Flowers director Andrei Blaier, 1974
- The Wall director Constantin Vaeni, 1974
- A Fantastic Comedy director Ion Popescu-Gopo, 1975
- Accident director Sergiu Nicolaescu, 1976
- Rock'n'Roll Wolf director Elisabeta Bostan, 1976
- Totally Unprepared director Pierre Bokor, 1976
- Solitude's Last Night director Virgil Calotescu, 1976
- The Last Days of Summer director Savel Stiopul, 1976
- For the country director Sergiu Nicolaescu, 1977
- The Arms of Venus director Mircea Drăgan, 1978
- Uncertain Roads director Virgil Calotescu, 1978
- The man we need director Manole Marcus, 1979
- The Last Night of Love director Sergiu Nicolaescu, 1979
- Trap for Hired Guns director Sergiu Nicolaescu, 1981
- The Duel director Sergiu Nicolaescu, 1981
- Circus Performers director Elisabeta Bostan, 1981
- Circus Performers at the North Pole director Elisabeta Bostan, 1981
- Melodies in Costineşti director Constantin Păun, 1982
- Zacharicus director Claude Grinberg, 1983
- Promises director Elisabeta Bostan, 1985
- François Villon: the Maverick Poet director Sergiu Nicolaescu, 1987
- A Sunday in the Family director Francisc Munteanu, 1987
- Some Great Guys director Cornel Diaconu, 1987
- Sunny Smile director Elisabeta Bostan, 1987
- a Woman Champion director Elisabeta Bostan, 1989
- Direct Broadcast from Paradise director Cornel Diaconu, 1994
- Point Zero director Sergiu Nicolaescu, 1995
- The Man Of The Day director Dan Pița, 1998
- Survivor director Sergiu Nicolaescu, 2008
- The Silent Wedding director Horațiu Mălăele, 2008
- Somewhere in Palilula (2012)
- Cars 2- Finn McMissile (Romanian dubbing) (2012)

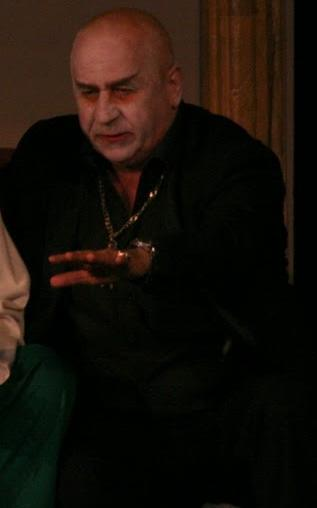
George Mihăiță in the play "Poker" (2008)

== Theatre ==
=== The Comedy Theater ===
- Castor / Polux – Fata Morgana by Dumitru Solomon, director Mihai Dimiu, 1971
- Soldier- Mother Courage and Her Children by Bertolt Brecht, director Lucian Giurchescu, 1972
- Billy the Kid- Indians by Arthur Kopit, director Lucian Giurchescu, 1973
- Spiridon – A Stormy Night by Ion Luca Caragiale, director Lucian Giurchescu, 1973
- Nano - Volpone by Ben Jonson, director Ion Cojar, 1974
- Arlequin - The Game of Love and Chance by Pierre de Marivaux, director Tudor Florian, 1976
- Juror no 8 - Twelve Angry Men by Reginald Rose, director G. Teodorescu, 1977
- Soldier - The Caucasian Chalk Circle by Bertolt Brecht, director Lucian Giurchescu, 1977
- Cristian Marinescu – The Wisdom - Tooth by Corneliu Marcu, director G. Teodorescu, 1978
- Trofimov - The Cherry Orchard by Anton Chekhov, director Lucian Giurchescu, 1979
- Barnaby Tacher - The Matchmaker by Thornton Wilder, director Valeriu Moisescu, 1979
- Harold - Harold and Maude by Colin Higgins, director Sanda Manu, 1980
- The Ghost - Here is a ghost by Kōbō Abe, director Cătălina Buzoianu, 1982
- Bouzin – Cat among the pigeons by Georges Feydeau, director Ion Lucian, 1989
- Willy - What we'll gonna do without Willy? by G. Astaloș, director L. Szekely Anton, 1992
- Mercur - Amphytrion by Molière, director Valeriu Moisescu, 1993
- Thersites - Troilus and Cressida by William Shakespeare, director Dragoș Galgoțiu, 1994
- Arthur, Beetles King - Flight by Mikhail Bulgakov, director Cătălina Buzoianu, 1995
- Ferdinard – An Italian Straw hat by Eugène Labiche, director Horațiu Mălăele, 1998
- Henry Perkins – Funny Money by Ray Cooney, director Horaţiu Mălăele, 2001
- Titel – Poker by Adrian Lustig, director Alexandru Tocilescu, 2004
- Pissale – Ubu Enchained by Alfred Jarry, director Gábor Tompa, 2004
- The Mayor – The Government Inspector by Nikolai Gogol, director Horațiu Mălăele, 2006

=== Bulandra Theater ===
- The Journalistsby Alexandru Mirodan, director Valeriu Moisescu, 1971

=== The National Theater Bucharest ===
- Guliţă – Mad'me Chiriţa by Vasile Alecsandri, director Horea Popescu, 1969

=== Baia Mare Theater ===
- Spiridon – A Stormy Night by Ion Luca Caragiale, director Magda Bordeianu, 1972

== Television ==
- Let's fill the earth with dreams! By Dan Tărchilă, director Eugen Todoran
- Doctor in philosophy by Branislav Nușici, director Matei Alexandru
- The Sicilian Woman by Aurel Baranga, director Olimpia Arghir
- Chief of Soul sector by Alexandru Mirodan, director Letiția Popa
- Boldness by Gheorghe Vlad, director Letiția Popa
- Spring Violins by Al. Stein, director Domnița Munteanu
- Marriage is not a game by I.D. Șerban, director Olimpia Arghir
- On Holiday by Constantin Stoiciu, director Andrei Blaier
- The Girl Who Moved Parâng by I.D. Şerban, director Nae Cosmescu
- The Journalists by Alexandru Mirodan, director Valeriu Moisescu
- Hope never dies at dawn by Romul Guga, director Nae Cosmescu
- Impossible Marriage by Alex Ștefănescu, director Silviu Jicman
- Duck head by Gheorghe Ciprian, director Constantin Dicu
- When a Baby Comes by André Roussin, director Constantin Dicu
- Caragiale, but not theater director Sanda Manu
- The pursuit director Radu Gabrea
- The Mușatin director Sorana Coroamă Stanca
- Matrimonial Agency director Gelu Colceag
- Maria's secret produced by Antena 1
- Incoming Police director Phil Ramuno
- The Heritage produced by Pro TV

== Directing ==
- Sun for two, 2007

== Books ==
- George Mihăiță, Teenagers drama-Nobody is alone, 2002
