= Somewhere in Palilula =

- Film poster
- Romanian: Undeva la Palilula
- Directed by: Silviu Purcărete
- Starring: Áron Dimény; George Mihăiță
- Release date: 20 April 2012
- Running time: 145 minutes
- Country: Romania
- Language: Romanian

Somewhere in Palilula (Romanian: Undeva la Palilula) is a 2012 Romanian drama film directed by Silviu Purcărete.

== Cast ==
- Áron Dimény -Serafim
- George Mihăiță as Ilie Tudorin
- Răzvan Vasilescu as Predoleanu
- Constantin Chiriac as Virgil Codreanu (Trotzki)
- Sorin Leoveanu as Gogu
- Ofelia Popii as Leana Mică

== Reception ==
The film was watched by 12,253 viewers in cinemas in Romania between the premiere and December 31, 2014, according to records kept by Romania's National Center of Cinematography.
