= Dansez pentru tine season 1 =

Dansez pentru tine
- Season 1
- Celebrity winner: Andra
- Professional winner: Florin Birică
- No. of episodes: 8

Release
- Original network: PRO TV

The first season of Dansez pentru tine the Romanian version of Dancing with the Stars debuted on PRO TV in 2006. Eight celebrities were paired with eight professional ballroom dancers. Ștefan Bănică, Jr. and Olivia Steer were the hosts for this season. Winners this season were Andra & Florin Birică.

== Couples ==
The 8 celebrities and professional dance partners were:

Celebrity	Occupation	Professional partner	Status
Radu Ille	Singer	Lavinia Ghiță	Eliminated 1st on week 2
Viorel Sipos	Singer	Alexandra Cristea	Eliminated 2nd on week 3
Raluca Arvat	Sports newscaster	Virgil Hudici	Eliminated 3rd on week 4
Ionuț Iftimoaie	Kickboxer	Monica Grosu	Eliminated 4th on week 5
Anca Țurcașiu	Actress & Singer	Adi Drăgan	Eliminated 5th on week 6
Cristina Rus	Singer	Bogdan Negrea	Third place on week 7
Arsenie Toderaș	Singer	Aliona Munteanu	Runner-up on week 8
Andra	Singer	Florin Birică	Winners on week 8
