= Angela Moldovan =

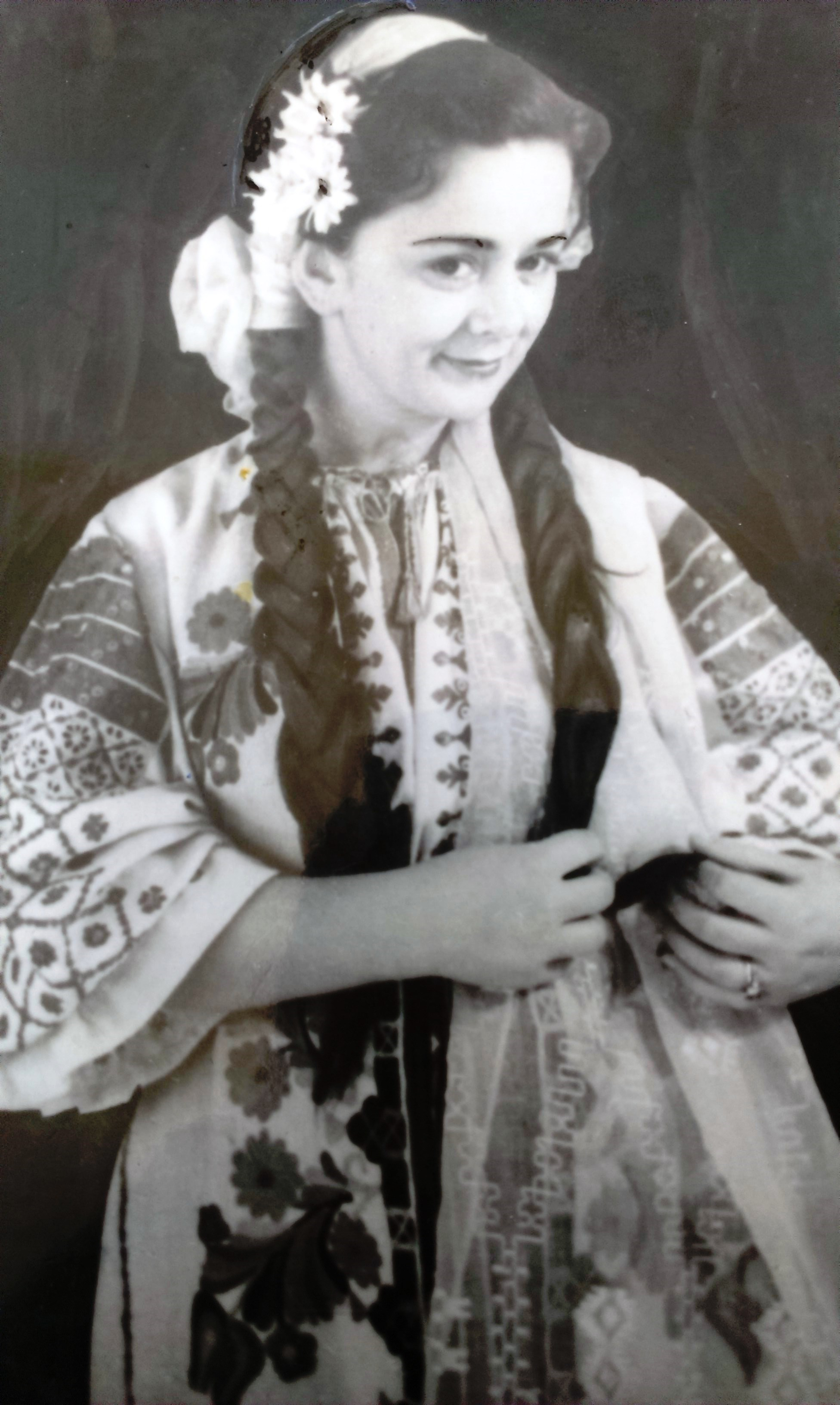

Background information
- Born: 19 September 1927; Chișinău, Kingdom of Romania (present-day Republic of Moldova)
- Died: 13 October 2013 (aged 86); Bucharest, Romania
- Genres: Romanian popular music, Opera
- Occupation(s): Singer, actress
- Labels: Electrecord

Angela Moldovan (19 September 1927 – 13 October 2013) was a Romanian singer of popular music and, to a lesser public knowledge, an accomplished opera singer, but also an actress, mostly known for her roles in the musical Veronica and its sequel Veronica se întoarce.

Born in Chișinău, she later moved with her family to Târgu-Mureș, then Timișoara and Suceava. She finished high school in Suceava, and then the Conservatory and the Faculty of Philology at the University of Cluj.

She was first married to artist Victor Moldovan, and later with Mircea Block.
