= Veronica se întoarce =

- Directed by: Elisabeta Bostan
- Starring: Lulu Mihaescu Margareta Pâslaru Dem Rădulescu
- Cinematography: Iulius Druckmann
- Release date: 1973
- Running time: 84 minutes
- Country: Romania
- Language: Romanian

Veronica se întoarce (Veronica Returns or Veronica is Back) is a 1973 Romanian musical film directed by Elisabeta Bostan. It is the sequel to Bostan's 1972 musical Veronica.

== Cast ==
- Lulu Mihăescu as Veronica
- Margareta Pîslaru as Teacher / the Ant Queen / the fairy
- Dem Rădulescu as Dănilă the Tomcat / the cook
- Angela Moldovan as Smarand

== Release ==
- The film was theatrically released in Romania in December 1973.

== Reception ==
A retrospective Romanian reviews wrote, "The photography (by Iulius Druckmann) is elegantly subordinated to the action, creating an atmosphere of delight and poetry necessary for the fairytale. Less neat than in the first film, the post-sync and some tricks (in the flight of dandelions scene) are more annoyingly visible." The film was said to be "suggestive of how sexual politics are created by narratives and cultural forms. The communist propaganda was using the prescribed gender role of the woman as the Caretaker Mother".

== See also ==
- List of Romanian films
- Cinema of Romania
