= Augustin Viziru =

Romanian actor

- Born: August 7, 1980 (age 45); Bucharest, Romania
- Occupation: Actor
- Years active: 2005–present

Augustin Marin Viziru Petre (born 7 August 1980) is a Romanian actor. He is best known for his roles in Romanian telenovelas produced by Media Pro Pictures, as well as for his sports career, particularly in billiards. He is the younger brother of actor and singer Lucian Viziru.

== Career ==
Before becoming an actor, he started his career as a tennis and football coach. Viziru attended "Jean Monnet" High School in Bucharest and continued his studies at the National Academy of Physical Education and Sports (A.N.E.F.S.), specializing in tennis.

His passion for acting was discovered with his debut in the romanian telenovela "Lacrimi de iubire" (Tears of Love), produced by Media Pro Pictures, where he played the role of Max. Since then, he has been part of numerous Romanian productions, becoming well known for the negative roles he has portrayed.

== Filmography ==
- Tătuțu' (2024) – Ciroză
- Libertate (2023) – Romică
- Legații (2022) – Cornel
- Odată pentru totdeauna (2022) – Jeni
- Vlad (2021) – Chiky Chan
- Faci sau taci (2019) – Valer Codrescu
- Când mama nu-i acasă (2017) – Doruleț
- O grămadă de caramele (2017) – Doruleț
- Ghinionistul (2017) – Gogoi
- Umbre (2014) – Romicã
- Fetele lu' dom' Profesor (2014) – Vali Busuioc
- Îngeri pierduți (2012) – Robi Lăcătuș
- Pariu cu viața (2011) – Titi
- Iubire și onoare (2011) – Aziz bin Hussein el-Jisr
- Aniela (2009) – Ion
- Regina (2008) – Arrmando
- Poveste de cartier (2008) – Nic
- Lacrimi de iubire – filmu (2006) – Max
- Iubire ca în filme (2006) – Virgil Lazăr
- Lacrimi de iubire (2005) – Matei (Max)
