= Ma-ma (1976 film) =

Ma-ma Mama Rock'n Roll Wolf
- Directed by: Elisabeta Bostan
- Written by: Vasilica Istrate; Yuri Entin; Elisabeta Bostan
- Starring: Lyudmila Gurchenko; Mikhail Boyarsky; George Mihăiță; Florian Pittiș; Violeta Andrei; Oleg Popov; Saveliy Kramarov
- Production companies: Romania Film; Mosfilm; Ralux Film
- Release dates: October 17, 1976 (Russia); November 21, 1976 (Romania)
- Running time: 83 minutes
- Countries: Romania; Soviet Union; France
- Languages: Romanian; Russian; English

Rock'n'Roll Wolf (Romanian: Mama, Mother, Russian: Мама, international title: Rock 'n Roll Wolf) is a musical film from 1976 and is a Romanian–Soviet–French co-production.

The storyline is loosely based on the famous plot about the goat and her kids, published as "The Wolf and the Seven Young Kids" in Grimm's Fairy Tales and known to Romanian audience as Ion Creangă's "Capra cu trei iezi" ("The Goat and her Three Kids") and to Russian audience as a folk tale "Волк и семеро козлят" ("The Wolf and the Seven Kids"). In the movie the number of goat kids is five. The script was written by Vasilica Istrate and Yuri Entin, and Elisabeta Bostan directed.

The movie was filmed simultaneously in three languages (Romanian, Russian and English). The cast was formed by dancers from Moscow Circus, Moscow Circus on Ice, and Bolshoi Ballet. In 1977, the movie won the Silver Cup at the Children's Film Festival in Venice.

== Plot ==
The movie opens with Rada on her way home to her children, who she had left alone while she gathered fruit in the forest. Her neighbors compliment her in song, and Rada mentions to them that she is afraid of the wolf.

Petrika the donkey, the wolf's nephew, and Rassul the lynx are seen watching the children play. After Rada returns home, They sing about how the wolf Titi Suru is coming and how he will make the noisy children be quiet.

Titi Suru arrives and sings about how he is actually a very friendly wolf who is not to blame for any trouble. However, he also makes implied threats about how he is still a wolf. Rada and Titi Suru argue, Rada saying her children are just playing harmlessly in her yard and that she will defend them if need be. Soon after, Suru tells his crew (the donkey, lynx, and wolf nephew from earlier) how he intends to kidnap Rada's children.

Suru spies on Rada's children as the fair comes into town. He sees Rada singing a song for her children, telling them not to open the door for anyone unless they hear her song. She leaves for the fair shortly after, and Suru attempts to imitate her song so the children will open the door. He fails to imitate Rada's singing convincingly and is unable to get inside.

Matei, one of Rada's children, sneaks out to the fair while Rada is gone. Shortly after, Suru attempts again to get the other children to open the door. The children see him through the window and realize he is not their mother, once again refusing to let him inside.

At the fair there are many attractions: the swallow shows a group of ballet dancers dancing on a line, and bears are selling fruits, nuts and honey for winter.

Rada returns home from the fair, the children opening the door when they hear her song. The children inform Rada that Matei snuck out. We then see Matei being found and chased by Suru's crew, eventually evading them by jumping to a rock they cannot reach.

Rada goes out again in search of Matei, but is forced to return home when night falls and it begins to rain. Her voice has become hoarse from the cold weather and her crying, causing her children to not recognize her song. Rada is forced to stay with one of her neighbors as her children will not open the door.

Suru dresses in clothes stolen from Rada's clothesline and practices her song, becoming increasingly skilled at imitating her voice. He sings at Rada's door again and seems to be convincing the children inside, but then Matei returns and shouts for them to not open the door. Matei as well as 3 of the other kids are swiftly captured by Suru, who sends a ransom note to Rada.

Suru's crew sees Rada and several people from the town doing something unknown at the meeting spot Suru had proposed for the ransom (a frozen pond.) The crew realizes that things have gotten messier than they anticipated, and that Rada is out for revenge.

Suru and Rada ice skate on the pond together, Suru demanding the ransom money. Rada throws the bag of money, and Suru jumps to catch it. This causes him to fall into an ice hole Rada and the townspeople had created in secret earlier.

Suru struggles in the freezing water as Rada demands to know where her child is. To save Suru, his crew appears with the kids and sets them free. Rada and all her children are reunited. The townspeople pull Suru out of the water and he apologizes, promising to be good from now on.

== Cast ==
- Lyudmila Gurchenko: Rada, the Goat (Auntie Masha in the Russian version)
- Mikhail Boyarsky: Titi Suru, the Wolf (The Gray Wolf in the Russian version)
- George Mihăiță: Petrika, the Donkey (unnamed in the Russian version)
- Florian Pittiș: The Parrot
- Violeta Andrei: The Swallow
- Oleg Popov: Father Martin, the Bear (unnamed in the Russian and English versions)
- Savely Kramarov: The Young Wolf, Titi Suru's nephew
- Valentin Manokhin: Rassul, the Lynx (unnamed in the Russian version)
- Paula Radulescu: The Doe-Rabbit
- Vasile Mentzel: The Rabbit
- Vera Ivleva: The Sheep
- Evgeniy Gerchakov: The Ram
- Lilianu Petrescu: The Lamb
- Natalya Krachkovskaya: The She-Bear
- Marina Polyak: The Squirrel
- Lulu Mihăescu: The eldest daughter
- Petya Degryarov: Matei, the eldest kid (Mityai in the Russian version)
- Timur Asaliev: Goga, the youngest kid (unnamed in the Romanian and English versions)
- Adrian Cristea: Goat kid
- Matei Opriș: Goat kid

== List of songs ==
1. Dream (introduction) (Мечта (вступление))
2. Our beautiful village (Хороша деревня наша)
3. Swing (song of the beast) (Качели (песня зверят))
4. Dance of the goat and kids (Танец Козы и козлят)
5. Oh, the Goat will cry! (Ох, наплачется Коза!)
6. The Wolves are bad guys (Волки-бяки)
7. They will be afraid of us (Будут бояться нас)
8. Dance of the wolf's pack (Танец волчьей стаи)
9. Goats' Lullaby (Колыбельная Козы)
10. The parrot isn't a fool (song of the parrot)) (Попка - не дурак! (Песня Попугая))
11. Ding-dong, I'm your mother (Динь-дон, я ваша мама)
12. The disobedient Matei (Непослушный Митяй)
13. The fair (Ярмарка)
14. Don't be afraid of the distance (song of the swallow)) (Не страшат нас расстоянья (Песня Ласточки))
15. The meeting of Matei and the wolf's pack (Встреча Митяя и волчьей стаи)
16. Song of the bear (Песня Медведя)
17. Duet of the goat and the wolf at the fair (Дуэт Козы и Волка на ярмарке)
18. The parrot is a superstar (Попка - суперстар)
19. Dance of the donkey and the lamb (Танец Ослёнка и Овечки)
20. The pursuit of Matei by the wolf's pack (Погоня волчьей стаи за Митяем)
21. The kids today (Пошла молодёжь)
22. The goat and the wolf. Song of the wolf) (Коза у Волка. Песня Волка)
23. Feud and malice (Вражда и злоба)
24. Mummy (Мама)
25. Winter (Зима)
26. Song of the three/Song of the wolf's pack (Песня троих/Песня волчьей шайки)
27. Potpourri on the ice (Попурри на льду)
28. Tango of the wolf and the goat (Танго Волка и Козы)
29. Song about mother (final) (Песня о маме (финал))
