= Elisabeta Bostan =

Romanian film director

- Born: 1 March 1931 (age 95); Buhuși, Bacău County, Kingdom of Romania
- Education: Caragiale Academy of Theatrical Arts and Cinematography
- Occupations: Film director, screenwriter
- Years active: 1956–1991
- Employer(s): Caragiale Academy of Theatrical Arts and Cinematography
- Notable work: Kingdom in the Clouds (1969); Veronica (1972); Veronica se întoarce (1973); Mama (1976)
- Awards: Gijón International Film Festival Prize (1964); Gopo Award (2009)

Elisabeta Bostan (born 1 March 1931) is a Romanian film director and screenwriter. She directed 25 films between 1956 and 1991.

== Biography ==
Born in Buhuși, Bacău County, she attended the Calistrat Hogaș High School in Piatra Neamț, where she staged her first theater production at age 14. She then went to Bucharest, where she enrolled in the Institute of Theatre and Film I.L. Caragiale, graduating in 1954. She made her debut in 1958 with two short films, "Trei jocuri românești" and "Cloșca cu puii de aur". Bostan taught at the Institute of Theatre and Film, where she served for a period as Dean.

She received prizes at festivals in Moscow, Tehran, Cannes, Venice, Gijón, and Tours. In 2009 she received the Gopo Award for Lifetime Achievement.

== Filmography ==
- Culegere de dansuri românești (1956)
- Trei jocuri românești (1958)
- Dansul 'Cloșca cu puii de aur' (1958)
- Cloșca cu pui (1958)
- Hora (1959)
- Puștiul (1962)
- Năică și peștișorul (1963)
- Amintiri din copilărie (1964)
- Pupăza din tei (1965)
- Năică și barza (1966)
- Năică și veverița (1967)
- Năică pleacă la București (1967)
- Tinerețe fără bătrânețe (1969)
- Veronica (1972)
- Veronica se întoarce (1973)
- Mama (1976)
- Saltimbancii (1981)
- Un Saltimbanc la Polul Nord (1982)
- Fram (1983) – TV series
- Promisiuni (1985)
- Zâmbet de soare (1987)
- Unde ești, copilărie? (1988)
- Desene pe asfalt (1989)
- Campioana (1990)
- Telefonul (1991)

== See also ==
- List of Romanian film and theatre directors
- List of Romanian films
