= Cornel Patrichi =

Romanian ballet dancer, choreographer and actor (1944–2016)

- Born: Cornel Patrichi; 1 April 1944; Bucharest, Kingdom of Romania
- Died: 5 April 2016 (aged 72); Bucharest, Romania
- Resting place: Pipera Cemetery, Voluntari
- Occupations: Ballet dancer; choreographer; actor
- Spouse: Cornelia Patrichi
- Children: 1
- Awards: Order of Cultural Merit

Cornel Patrichi (Romanian pronunciation: [korˈnel paˈtrici]; 1 April 1944 – 5 April 2016) was a Romanian ballet dancer, choreographer, and actor.

== Biography ==
Born in Bucharest in 1944, he attended School 18, near Piața Romană, and then completed high school (with specialty in choreography) in 1962. Upon graduation, he was hired as ballet dancer at the Constantin Tănase Theater by his uncle, Nicolae Patrichi, the musical director of the theater. Starting in 1972, he was, for ten years, a ballet dancer at the Fantasio Theater in Constanța.

He was married to Cornelia Patrichi, a ballerina, with whom he had a son, Alexandru. The two moved in 1987 to Italy, where they founded in Tuscany a ballet school, "Dance Studio Patrichi". In 1999 the couple returned to Romania, though their son remained in Italy. In 2004, Patrichi was awarded the Order of Cultural Merit, Knight rank by Romanian President Ion Iliescu.

Patrichi died in Bucharest in 2016 after a long battle with cancer, and was buried at Pipera Cemetery, in Voluntari.

== Filmography ==
=== As choreographer ===
- Cîntecele mării (1970)
- Aventuri la Marea Neagră (1972)
- The Actor and the Savages (1975)
- În pulberea de stele (1976)
- Eu, tu, și... Ovidiu (1977)
- Viraj periculos (1983)

=== As actor ===
- Mens sana in corpore sano (1965)
- De trei ori București (1968)
- Balul de sâmbătă seara (1968)
- Pădurea pierdută (1971)
- Veronica (1972)
- Un august în flăcări (1973)
- Gloria nu cîntă (1976)
- Melodii, melodii (1978)
- Detașamentul Concordia (1980)
- Sfârșitul nopții (1982)
