= Margareta Pâslaru =

Romanian actor, composer and singer

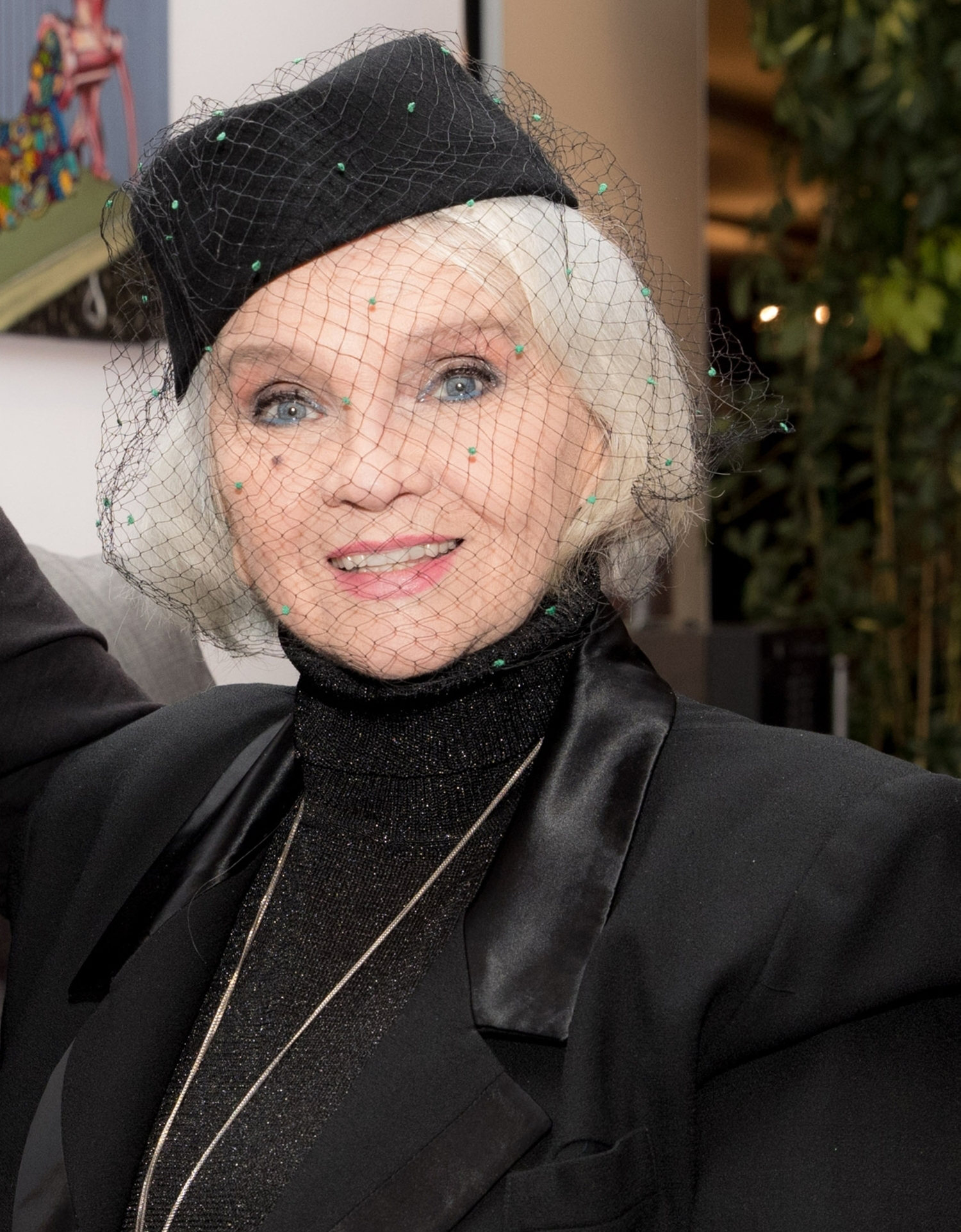
UARF Gala

Margareta Pâslaru or Pîslaru (Romanian pronunciation: [marɡaˈreta pɨsˈlaru]; born July 9, 1943, in Bucharest) is a Romanian-American singer, actress, composer, lyricist, TV producer, and artistic director. Debuting in 1958, Pâslaru celebrated the 50th anniversary of her career at The Romanian Union of Composers in Bucharest in 2008. Pâslaru was married to Gheorghe Sencovici, a former Olympic skeet shooter, until his death, and the couple had a daughter, Ana Maria, and a grandson, Luca. Pâslaru has lived and worked in the United States since 1983, splitting between Manhattan and Bucharest. She was formerly a resident of Summit, New Jersey.

A multi-talented artist, Pâslaru studied piano, ballet, and painting. Sung in Romanian, the style of her repertoire is very similar to the light pop music of the 1960s by artists such as Barbra Streisand and Petula Clark. She has collaborated numerous notable musicians, among them Radu Goldiș. Two songs from her repertoire were used for the 2005 international prize-winning Romanian film, The Death of Mr. Lazarescu: "Cum e oare" (Telling It Like It Really Is) and "Chemarea mării" (The Waves of the Ocean). Throughout her career, over 65 Romanian composers wrote music for Margareta Pâslaru.

== Awards and Distinctions ==
2021 - The Academic Award and the Trophy of the Romanian Filmmakers Union - UCIN - for Lifetime Achievement.

2019 - The Value Platinum Award given by Youth Festival - at Gong Theater - Sibiu.

2016 - Lifetime Award of Excellence Margareta Pâslaru 'Artist plurivalent' granted by the Union of Authors & Film Producers UARF
2013 - Decorated with the Order of the Crown of Romania, Knight rank by King Michael I of Romania
2013 - Live time Award of Excellence by Confidential TV show
2012 - The trophy "Women matter"- Music category
2012 - Award of Excellence given by VIP magazine at Women Superlatives Gala
2011 - Award "Vasilica Tastaman" given by Humoristic Society "Păcală"
2011 - Award of Excellence given by Electrecord record company2011 – The Red Cross Trophy „135 years of Humanity“ al The Red Cross Gala
2011 – Award of Excellence "A life dedicated to music & charity" – Confidenţial TV
2011 – „Ambassador of the European Year of Volunteerism 2011 for Romania
2010 – The Electrecord Trophy created especially for Margareta Pâslaru honoring 50 years from her first record "Call of the sea" by George Grigoriu at Electrecord Recording Company
2010 – Diploma of Artistic Excellence for collaborating with Top Romanesc Radio România Actualităţi
2010 – Diploma of Excellence of the Record Company Electrecord
2009 – „Person of the Year 2009“ in Israel – Gala 10 for Romania, 10 for Israel
2009 – TVR Trophy "Time's Conquerors" for a lifetime dedicated to the Arts
2008 – Trophy of Excellence, Honorary diploma "10 for Romania"
2008 – "Radio Romania 80" Anniversary Award
2008 – Award of Excellence – 50 years from the debut – granted by MediaS
2007 – Award of Excellence – lifetime achievement – granted by Radio Romania News
2007 – Diploma for exceptional merit in supporting disadvantaged people of Romania – and her own STAR on Stars Blv. Callatis Fest. July 12
2006 – Life Time Achievement at "Successful Women" Gala
2006 – Diploma of Excellence for the entirety of artistic activity – Radio Romania – 78 years
2006 – VIP Award of Excellence – September edition LXXIIV
2006 – TVR50 trophy and diploma of Excellence, at TVR jubilee, for her role in Romanian Television history
2005 – The Videographer Award of Distinction – category TV/Program/Arts – "The Best Of..Artists & Their Art", Arlington Texas – USA
2004 – The Communicator Award of Distinction for "Forever Music" ( Cable TV/Educational program category) held in Arlington Texas
2004 – Gold Classic Telly Winner for "Jerome Hines" - Human Mosaics - (Cultural category) at the 25th Anniversary Telly Awards national competition
2003 – Telly Award finalist-Bronze (Cultural category) at the 24th Annual Telly Awards national competition held in Cincinnati OH – USA
2002 – "Women of Excellence Award" Arts & Humanities category – Union County, NJ – USA
2000 – Honorary Citizen of Bucharest
2000 – Honorary Member of the Romanian Red Cross
1999 – "International Stars of Romanian Song" Award, Bucharest – Romania, given by the Union of Composers "Musical Actuality".
1999 – Guest of Honor at UNITER GALA, Bucharest – Romania
1998 – The Humanitarian Distinction in Los Angeles, USA given by the Chamber of Commerce of California – Romania
1997 – Invited as Guest of Honor at the International Golden Stag Festival, Brasov – Romania
1996 – Honorary Member of UNESCO – Romania Club
1996 – Honorary member of UNICEF – Romania
1981 – The Composer Award – for the most popular song in TV contest with "The Magic Diamond" (music: Margareta Paslaru, lyrics E. Rotaru)
1979 – The Lyrics Award for "Pasarea maiastra". Music V. Vasilache Jr. text M. Paslaru, Youth Festival Bucuresti
1975 – First Prize – „Melodiile dragostei” – Music Ion Cristinoiu / lyrics Mihai Dumbravă – Festivalul Mamaia
1975 – Second Prize – „Aici la mine acasă” – Music George Grigoriu / lyrics Angel Grigoriu-Romeo Iorgulescu) – Festivalul Mamaia
1971 – The International Press Prize – Song Festival, Malta
1970 – The Sony Award – Tokyo International Song Festival, Japan
1970 – First Prize – „Această taină să rămână între noi” music Radu Şerban / lyrics Mihai Maximilian – Concursul National de Muzică Uşoară
1969 – The Golden Record of Romania given by Electrecord – Record Company
1969 – The Marble Record Trophy, M.I.D.E.M. – Cannes, France
1969 – The Press Award, Ankara – Turkey
1968 – Third Place, International Song Festival, Sopot, Poland
1968 – The Golden Stag Nominations, International Song Festival Brasov – Romania
1966 – Diploma debut in cinematography -"Tunelul" co-production Russian-Romanian National Film Fest. "Golden Pelican" Mamaia
1965 – „Seri la malul mării” – music Sile Dinicu / lyrics Aurel Felea, Mamaia Festival
1965 – The Radiotelevizion Award – „Cu tine” – music V. Veselovschi / lyrics A.Storin, Mamaia Festival
1964 – „Ochii tăi” – music Gelu Solomonescu / lyrics T. Balş, Mamaia Festival
1964 – „Două rândunici” – music R. Şerban / lyrics Constantin Cârjan Mamaia Fest
1963 – „Soarele e-ndrăgostit de Mamaia“ – music D. Şerbănescu / lyrics A. Felea at the First National Festival Mamaia
1963 – The Union of Writer Award – „How is it?" Florin Bogardo / lyrics M. Fortunescu at The First National Festival Mamaia
1961 – First prize vocal soloist – Margareta Pâslaru at VI edition of Bucharest amateur competition
