= Nicolae Iorga =

Romanian scholar, writer and politician (1871–1940)

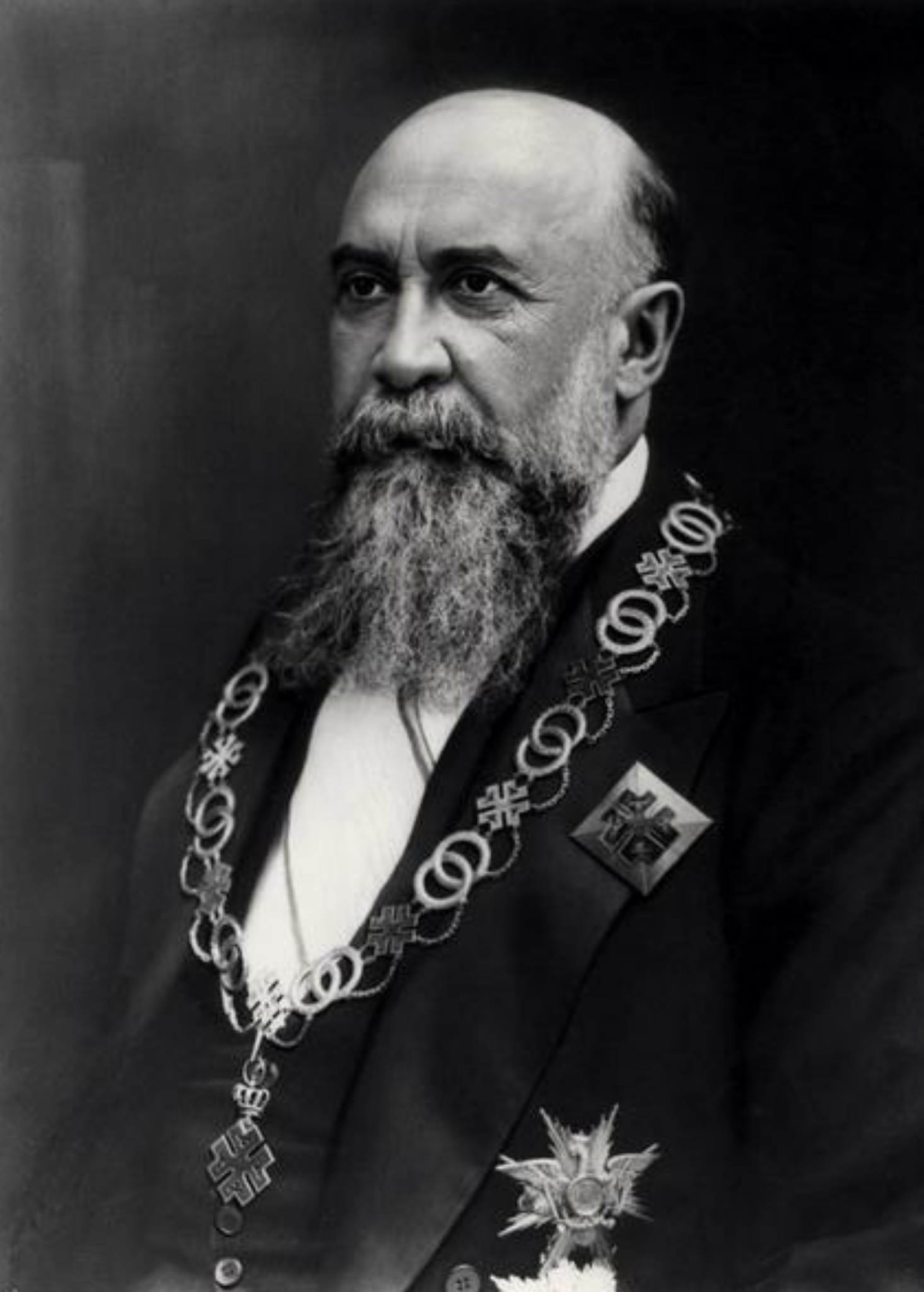
- Iorga in 1938

34th Prime Minister of Romania
- In office 19 April 1931 – 6 June 1932
- Monarch: Carol II
- Preceded by: Gheorghe Mironescu
- Succeeded by: Alexandru Vaida-Voievod

President of the Senate of Romania
- In office 9 June 1939 – 13 June 1939
- Monarch: Carol II
- Preceded by: Alexandru Lapedatu
- Succeeded by: Constantin Argetoianu

President of the Assembly of Deputies
- In office 9 December 1919 – 26 March 1920
- Monarch: Ferdinand I
- Preceded by: Alexandru Vaida-Voevod
- Succeeded by: Duiliu Zamfirescu

Member of the Crown Council
- In office 30 March 1938 – 6 September 1940
- Monarch: Carol II

Minister of Internal Affairs
- Acting; 18 April 1931 – 7 May 1931
- Prime Minister: Himself
- Preceded by: Ion Mihalache
- Succeeded by: Constantin Argetoianu (Acting)

Minister of Culture and Religious Affairs
- In office 18 April 1931 – 5 June 1932
- Prime Minister: Himself
- Preceded by: Nicolae Costăchescu
- Succeeded by: Dimitrie Gusti

President of the Democratic Nationalist Party
- In office 6 May 1910 – 16 December 1938 Serving with A. C. Cuza (until 26 April 1920)
- Preceded by: None (co-founder)
- Succeeded by: None (party formally banned under the 1938 Constitution)

Personal details
- Born: 17 January 1871 Botoșani, Principality of Romania
- Died: 27 November 1940 (aged 69) Strejnic, Prahova County, Kingdom of Romania
- Cause of death: Assassination by gunshots
- Resting place: Bellu Cemetery
- Party: Democratic Nationalist Party (1910–1938); National Renaissance Front (1938–1940)
- Spouses: Maria Tasu (m. 1890; div. 1900) Ecaterina Bogdan (m. 1901–1940)
- Education: Alexandru Ioan Cuza University; École pratique des hautes études Leipzig University
- Occupation: Writer, poet, professor, literary critic, politician
- Profession: Historian, philosopher
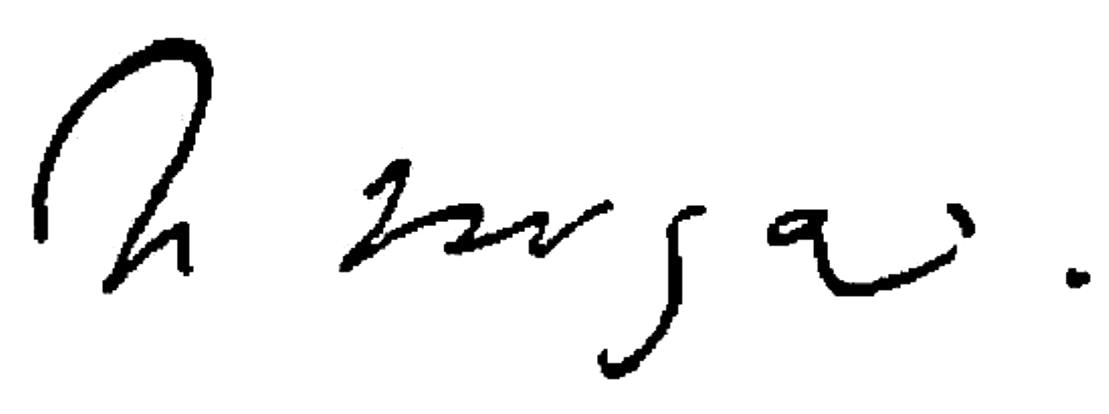
- Signature

Nicolae Iorga (Note: Variously Neculai Iorga, Nicolas Jorga, Nicolai Jorga or Nicola Jorga, born Nicu N. Iorga;) (Note: Romanian pronunciation: [nikoˈla.e ˈjorɡa]) (17 January 1871 – 27 November 1940) was a Romanian historian, politician, literary critic, memoirist, albanologist, poet and playwright. Co-founder (in 1910) of the Democratic Nationalist Party (PND), he served as a member of Parliament, President of the Deputies' Assembly and Senate, cabinet minister and briefly (1931–32) as Prime Minister. A child prodigy, polymath and polyglot, Iorga produced an unusually large body of scholarly works, establishing his international reputation as a medievalist, Byzantinist, Latinist, Slavist, art historian and philosopher of history. Holding teaching positions at the University of Bucharest, the University of Paris and several other academic institutions, Iorga was founder of the International Congress of Byzantine Studies and the Institute of South-East European Studies (ISSEE). His activity also included the transformation of Vălenii de Munte town into a cultural and academic center.

In parallel with his academic contributions, Nicolae Iorga was a prominent right-of-centre activist, whose political theory bridged conservatism, Romanian nationalism, and agrarianism. From Marxist beginnings, he switched sides and became a maverick disciple of the Junimea movement. Iorga later became a leadership figure at Sămănătorul, the influential literary magazine with populist leanings, and militated within the League for the Cultural Unity of All Romanians, founding vocally conservative publications such as Neamul Românesc, Drum Drept, Cuget Clar and Floarea Darurilor. His support for the cause of ethnic Romanians in Austria-Hungary made him a prominent figure in the pro-Entente camp by the time of World War I, and ensured him a special political role during the interwar existence of Greater Romania. Initiator of large-scale campaigns to defend Romanian culture in front of perceived threats, Iorga sparked most controversy with his antisemitic rhetoric, and was for long an associate of the far-right ideologue A. C. Cuza. He was an adversary of the dominant National Liberals, later involved with the opposition Romanian National Party.

Later in his life, Iorga opposed the radically fascist Iron Guard, and, after much oscillation, came to endorse its rival King Carol II. Involved in a personal dispute with the Guard's leader Corneliu Zelea Codreanu, and indirectly contributing to his killing, Iorga was also a prominent figure in Carol's corporatist and authoritarian party, the National Renaissance Front. He remained an independent voice of opposition after the Guard inaugurated its own National Legionary dictatorship, but was ultimately assassinated by a Guardist commando.

== Biography ==
=== Child prodigy ===
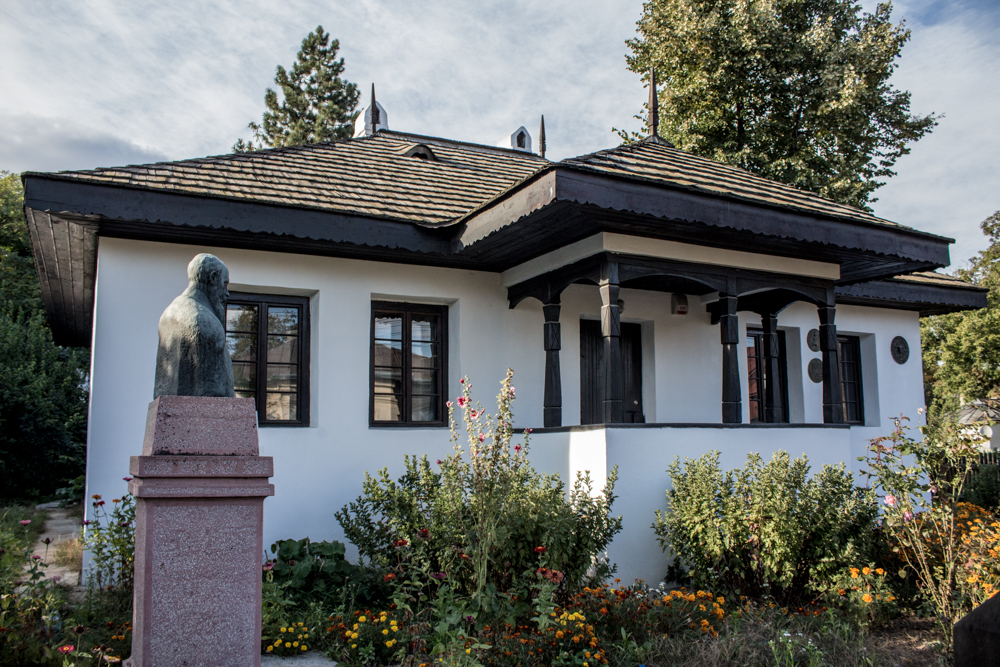
Memorial house in Botoșani

Nicolae Iorga was born in Botoșani into a family of Greek origin. His father, Nicu Iorga, was a practicing lawyer; he ultimately descended from a Greek merchant who had settled in Botoșani in the 18th century five generations before Nicolae Iorga's birth. His mother, Zulnia Iorga (née Arghiropol), was a woman of Phanariote Greek descent. Iorga claimed direct descent from the noble Mavrocordatos and Argyros families. He credited the five-generation-boyar status received from his father's side (e.g. the Miclescu and Catargi families) and the "old boyar" roots of his mother (e.g. the Mavrocordatos family) with having turned him into a politician. His parallel claim of being related to noble families such as the Cantacuzinos and the Craiovești is questioned by other researchers. Iorga is generally believed to have been born on 17 January 1871, although his birth certificate provides a date of 6 June.

In 1876, aged thirty-seven or thirty-eight, Nicu Sr. was incapacitated and then died of an unknown illness, orphaning Nicolae and his younger brother George. Nicolae would later write that the loss of his father dominated the image he had of his childhood. In 1878, he was enlisted at the Marchian Folescu School, where he discovered a love for intellectual pursuits and took pride in excelling in most academic areas. At age nine, he was allowed by his teachers to lecture his schoolmates on Romanian history. His history teacher, a refugee Pole, sparked his interest in research and his lifelong polonophilia. Iorga also credited this period with having shaped his lifelong views on Romanian language and local culture: "I learned Romanian... as it was spoken back in the day: plainly, beautifully and above all resolutely and colorfully, without the intrusions of newspapers and best-selling books". He credited the 19th-century polymath Mihail Kogălniceanu, whose works he first read as a child, with having shaped this literary preference.

Iorga enrolled in Botoșani's A. T. Laurian gymnasium in 1881, receiving top honors. In 1883, Iorga began tutoring some of his colleagues to supplement his family's main revenue (according to Iorga, a "miserable pension of pittance"). Aged thirteen, while on extended visit to his maternal uncle Emanuel "Manole" Arghiropol, he also made his press debut with paid contributions to Arghiropol's Romanul newspaper, including anecdotes and editorial pieces on European politics. The year 1886 was described by Iorga as "the catastrophe of my school life in Botoșani": on temporary suspension for not having greeted a teacher, Iorga opted to leave the city and apply for the National High School of Iași, being received into the scholarship program and praised by his new principal, the philologist Vasile Burlă. Iorga was already fluent in French, Italian, Latin and Greek; he later referred to Greek studies as "the most refined form of human reasoning".

By age seventeen, Iorga was becoming more rebellious. He first grew interested in political activities for the first time but displayed convictions which he later strongly disavowed; a self-described Marxist, Iorga promoted the left-wing magazine Viața Socială and lectured on Das Kapital. Seeing himself confined in the National College's "ugly and disgusting" boarding school, he defied its rules and was suspended a second time, losing scholarship privileges. Before readmission, he decided not to fall back on his family's financial support and instead returned to tutoring others. Iorga was suspended a third time for reading during a teacher's lesson but graduated in the top "first prize" category (with a 9.24 average) and subsequently took his Baccalaureate with honors.

=== University of Iași and Junimist episode ===
In 1888, Nicolae Iorga passed his entry examination for the University of Iași Faculty of Letters, becoming eligible for a scholarship soon after. Upon the completion of his second term, he also received a special dispensation from the Kingdom of Romania's Education Ministry, and, as a result, applied for and passed his third term examinations, effectively graduating one year ahead of his class. Before the end of the year, he also passed his license examination magna cum laude, with a thesis on Greek literature, an achievement which consecrated his reputation inside both academia and the public sphere. Hailed as a "morning star" by the local press and deemed a "wonder of a man" by his teacher A. D. Xenopol, Iorga was honored by the faculty with a special banquet. Three academics (Xenopol, Nicolae Culianu, Ioan Caragiani) formally brought Iorga to the attention of the Education Ministry, proposing him for the state-sponsored program which allowed academic achievers to study abroad.

The interval witnessed Iorga's brief affiliation with Junimea, a literary club with conservative leanings, whose informal leader was literary and political theorist Titu Maiorescu. In 1890, literary critic Ștefan Vârgolici and cultural promoter Iacob Negruzzi published Iorga's essay on poet Veronica Micle in the Junimist tribune Convorbiri Literare. Having earlier attended the funeral of writer Ion Creangă, a dissident Junimist and Romanian literature classic, he took a public stand against the defamation of another such figure, the dramatist Ion Luca Caragiale, groundlessly accused of plagiarism by journalist Constantin Al. Ionescu-Caion. He expanded his contribution as an opinion journalist, publishing with some regularity in various local or national periodicals of various leanings, from the socialist Contemporanul and Era Nouă to Bogdan Petriceicu Hasdeu's Revista Nouă. This period saw his debut as a socialist poet (in Contemporanul) and critic (in both Lupta and Literatură și Știință).

Also in 1890, Iorga married Maria Tasu, whom he was to divorce in 1900. He had previously been in love with an Ecaterina C. Botez, but, after some hesitation, decided to marry into the family of Junimea man Vasile Tasu, much better situated in the social circles. Xenopol, who was Iorga's matchmaker, also tried to obtain for Iorga a teaching position at Iași University. The attempt was opposed by other professors, on grounds of Iorga's youth and politics. Instead, Iorga was briefly a high school professor of Latin in the southern city of Ploiești, following a public competition overseen by writer Alexandru Odobescu. The time he spent there allowed him to expand his circle of acquaintances and personal friends, meeting writers Caragiale and Alexandru Vlahuță, historians Hasdeu and Grigore Tocilescu, and Marxist theorist Constantin Dobrogeanu-Gherea.

=== Studies abroad ===
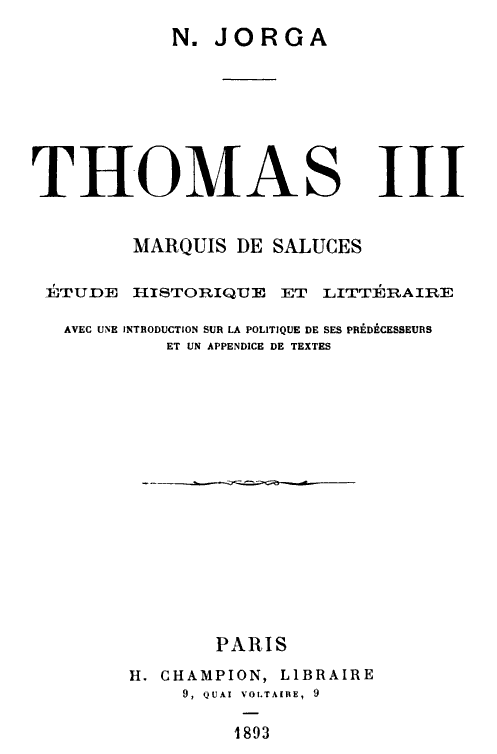
Title page of Thomas III, marquis de Saluces, 1893

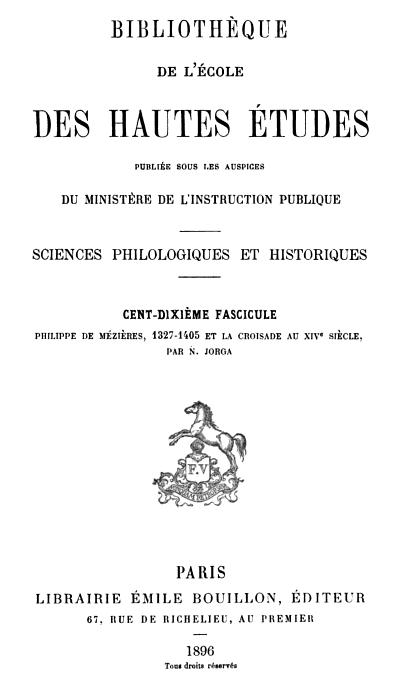
Title page of Iorga's Philippe de Mézières, in its 1896 edition

Having received the scholarship early in the year, he made his first study trips to Italy (April and June 1890), and subsequently left for a longer stay in France, enlisting at the École pratique des hautes études. He was a contributor for the Encyclopédie française, personally recommended there by Slavist Louis Léger. Reflecting back on this time, he stated: "I never had as much time at my disposal, as much freedom of spirit, as much joy of learning from those great figures of mankind ... than back then, in that summer of 1890". While preparing for his second diploma, Iorga also pursued his interest in philology, learning English, German, and rudiments of other Germanic languages. In 1892, he was in England and in Italy, researching historical sources for his French-language thesis on Philippe de Mézières, a Frenchman in the Crusade of 1365. In tandem, he became a contributor to Revue Historique, a leading French academic journal.

Somewhat dissatisfied with French education, Iorga presented his dissertation and, in 1893, left for the German Empire, attempting to enlist in the University of Berlin's PhD program. His working paper, on Thomas III of Saluzzo, was not received, because Iorga had not spent three years in training, as required. As an alternative, he gave formal pledge that the paper in question was entirely his own work, but his statement was invalidated by technicality: Iorga's work had been redacted by a more proficient speaker of German, whose intervention did not touch the substance of Iorga's research. The ensuing controversy led him to apply for a University of Leipzig PhD: his text, once reviewed by a commission grouping three prominent German scholars (Adolf Birch-Hirschfeld, Karl Gotthard Lamprecht, Charles Wachsmuth), earned him the needed diploma in August. On 25 July, Iorga had also received his École pratique diploma for the earlier work on de Mézières, following its review by Gaston Paris and Charles Bémont. He spent his time further investigating the historical sources, at archives in Berlin, Leipzig and Dresden. Between 1890 and the end of 1893, he had published three works: his debut in poetry (Poezii, "Poems"), the first volume of Schițe din literatura română ("Sketches on Romanian Literature", 1893; second volume 1894), and his Leipzig thesis, printed in Paris as Thomas III, marquis de Saluces. Étude historique et littéraire ("Thomas, Margrave of Saluzzo. Historical and Literary Study").

Living in poor conditions (as reported by visiting scholar Teohari Antonescu), the four-year engagement of his scholarship still applicable, Nicolae Iorga decided to spend his remaining time abroad, researching more city archives in Germany (Munich), Austria (Innsbruck) and Italy (Florence, Milan, Naples, Rome, Venice etc.) In this instance, his primordial focus was on historical figures from his Romanian homeland, the defunct Danubian Principalities of Moldavia and Wallachia: the Moldavian Prince Peter the Lame, his son Ștefăniță, and Romania's national hero, the Wallachian Prince Michael the Brave. He also met, befriended and often collaborated with fellow historians from European countries other than Romania: the editors of Revue de l'Orient Latin, who first published studies Iorga later grouped in the six volumes of Notes et extraits ("Notices and Excerpts") and Frantz Funck-Brentano, who enlisted his parallel contribution for Revue Critique. Iorga's articles were also featured in two magazines for ethnic Romanian communities in Austria-Hungary: Familia and Vatra.

=== Return to Romania ===
Making his comeback to Romania in October 1894, Iorga settled in the capital city of Bucharest. He changed residence several times, until eventually settling in Grădina Icoanei area. He agreed to compete in a sort of debating society, with lectures which only saw print in 1944. He applied for the Medieval History Chair at the University of Bucharest, submitting a dissertation in front of an examination commission comprising historians and philosophers (Caragiani, Odobescu, Xenopol, alongside Aron Densușianu, Constantin Leonardescu and Petre Râșcanu), but totaled a 7 average which only entitled him to a substitute professor's position. The achievement, at age 23, was still remarkable in its context.

The first of his lectures came later that year as personal insight on the historical method, Despre concepția actuală a istoriei și geneza ei ("On the Present-day Concept of History and Its Genesis"). He was again out of the country in 1895, visiting the Netherlands and, again, Italy, in search of documents, publishing the first section of his extended historical records' collection Acte și fragmente cu privire la istoria românilor ("Acts and Excerpts Regarding the History of Romanians"), his Romanian Atheneum conference on Michael the Brave's rivalry with condottiero Giorgio Basta, and his debut in travel literature (Amintiri din Italia, "Recollections from Italy"). The next year came Iorga's official appointment as curator and publisher of the Hurmuzachi brothers collection of historical documents, the position being granted to him by the Romanian Academy. The appointment, first proposed to the institution by Xenopol, overlapped with disputes over the Hurmuzachi inheritance, and came only after Iorga's formal pledge that he would renounce all potential copyrights resulting from his contribution. He also published the second part of Acte și fragmente and the printed rendition of the de Mézières study (Philippe de Mézières, 1337–1405). Following an October 1895 reexamination, he was granted full professorship with a 9.19 average.

1895 was also the year when Iorga began his collaboration with the Iași-based academic and political agitator A. C. Cuza, making his earliest steps in antisemitic politics, founding with him a group known as the Universal ()and Romanian Antisemitic Alliance. In 1897, the year when he was elected a corresponding member of the academy, Iorga traveled back to Italy and spent time researching more documents in the Austro-Hungarian Kingdom of Croatia-Slavonia, at Dubrovnik. He also oversaw the publication of the 10th Hurmuzachi volume, grouping diplomatic reports authored by Kingdom of Prussia diplomats in the two Danubian Principalities (covering the interval between 1703 and 1844). After spending most of 1898 on researching various subjects and presenting the results as reports for the academy, Iorga was in Transylvania, the largely Romanian-inhabited subregion of Austria-Hungary. Concentrating his efforts on the city archives of Bistrița, Brașov and Sibiu, he made a major breakthrough by establishing that Stolnic Cantacuzino, a 17th-century man of letters and political intriguer, was the real author of an unsigned Wallachian chronicle that had for long been used as a historical source. He published several new books in 1899: Manuscrise din biblioteci străine ("Manuscripts from Foreign Libraries", 2 vols.), Documente românești din arhivele Bistriței ("Romanian Documents from the Bistrița Archives") and a French-language book on the Crusades, titled Notes et extraits pour servir à l'histoire des croisades ("Notes and Excerpts Covering the History of the Crusades", 2 vols.). Xenopol proposed his pupil for a Romanian Academy membership, to replace the suicidal Odobescu, but his proposition could not gather support.

Also in 1899, Nicolae Iorga inaugurated his contribution to the Bucharest-based French-language newspaper L'Indépendance Roumaine, publishing polemical articles on the activity of his various colleagues and, as a consequence, provoking a lengthy scandal. The pieces often targeted senior scholars who, as favorites or activists of the National Liberal Party, opposed both Junimea and the Maiorescu-endorsed Conservative Party: his estranged friends Hasdeu and Tocilescu, as well as V. A. Urechia and Dimitrie Sturdza. The episode, described by Iorga himself as a stormy but patriotic debut in public affairs, prompted his adversaries at the academy to demand the termination of his membership for undignified behavior. Tocilescu felt insulted by the allegations, challenged Iorga to a duel, but his friends intervened to mediate. Another scientist who encountered Iorga's wrath was George Ionescu-Gion, against whom Iorga enlisted negative arguments that, as he later admitted, were exaggerated. Among Iorga's main defenders were academics Dimitrie Onciul, N. Petrașcu, and, outside Romania, Gustav Weigand.

=== Opinions sincères and Transylvanian echoes ===
The young polemicist persevered in supporting this anti-establishment cause, moving on from L'Indépendance Roumaine to the newly established publication România Jună, interrupting himself for trips to Italy, the Netherlands and Galicia-Lodomeria. In 1900, he collected the scattered polemical articles into the French-language books Opinions sincères. La vie intellectuelle des roumains en 1899 ("Honest Opinions. The Romanians' Intellectual Life in 1899") and Opinions pérnicieuses d'un mauvais patriote ("The Pernicious Opinions of a Bad Patriot"). His scholarly activities resulted in a second trip into Transylvania, a second portion of his Bistrița archives collection, the 11th Hurmuzachi volume, and two works on Early Modern Romanian history: Acte din secolul al XVI-lea relative la Petru Șchiopul ("16th Century Acts Relating to Peter the Lame") and Scurtă istorie a lui Mihai Viteazul ("A Short History of Michael the Brave"). His controversial public attitude had nevertheless attracted an official ban on his Academy reports, and also meant that he was ruled out from the national Academy prize (for which distinction he had submitted Documente românești din arhivele Bistriței). The period also witnessed a chill in the Iorga's relationship with Xenopol.

In 1901, shortly after his divorce from Maria, Iorga married Ecaterina (Catinca), the sister of his friend and colleague Ioan Bogdan. Her other brother was cultural historian Gheorghe Bogdan-Duică, whose son, painter Catul Bogdan, Iorga would help achieve recognition. Soon after their wedding, the couple were in Venice, where Iorga received Karl Gotthard Lamprecht's offer to write a history of the Romanians to be featured as a section in a collective treatise of world history. Iorga, who had convinced Lamprecht not to assign this task to Xenopol, also completed Istoria literaturii române în secolul al XVIII-lea ("The History of Romanian Literature in the 18th Century"). It was presented to the academy's consideration, but rejected, prompting the scholar to resign in protest. To receive his imprimatur later in the year, Iorga appealed to fellow intellectuals, earning pledges and a sizable grant from the aristocratic Callimachi family.

Before the end of that year, the Iorgas were in the Austro-Hungarian city of Budapest. While there, the historian set up tight contacts with Romanian intellectuals who originated from Transylvania and who, in the wake of the Transylvanian Memorandum affair, supported ethnic nationalism while objecting to the intermediary Cisleithanian (Hungarian Crown) rule and the threat of Magyarization. Interested in recovering the Romanian contributions to Transylvanian history, in particular Michael the Brave's precursory role in Romanian unionism, Iorga spent his time reviewing, copying and translating Hungarian-language historical texts with much assistance from his wife. During the 300th commemoration of Prince Michael's death, which ethnic Romanian students transformed into a rally against Austro-Hungarian educational restrictions, Iorga addressed the crowds and was openly greeted by the protest's leaders, poet Octavian Goga and Orthodox priest Ioan Lupaș. In 1902, he published new tracts on Transylvanian or Wallachian topics: Legăturile Principatelor române cu Ardealul ("The Romanian Principalities' Links with Transylvania"), Sate și preoți din Ardeal ("Priests and Villages of Transylvania"), Despre Cantacuzini ("On the Cantacuzinos"), Istoriile domnilor Țării Românești ("The Histories of Wallachian Princes").

Iorga was by then making known his newly found interest in cultural nationalism and national didacticism, as expressed by him in an open letter to Goga's Budapest-based Luceafărul magazine. After further interventions from Goga and linguist Sextil Pușcariu, Luceafărul became Iorga's main mouthpiece outside Romania. Returning to Bucharest in 1903, Iorga followed Lamprecht's suggestion and focused on writing his first overview of Romanian national history, known in Romanian as Istoria românilor ("The History of the Romanians"). He was also involved in a new project of researching the content of archives throughout Moldavia and Wallachia, and, having reassessed the nationalist politics of Junimist poet Mihai Eminescu, helped collect and publish a companion to Eminescu's work.

=== Sămănătorul and 1906 riot ===
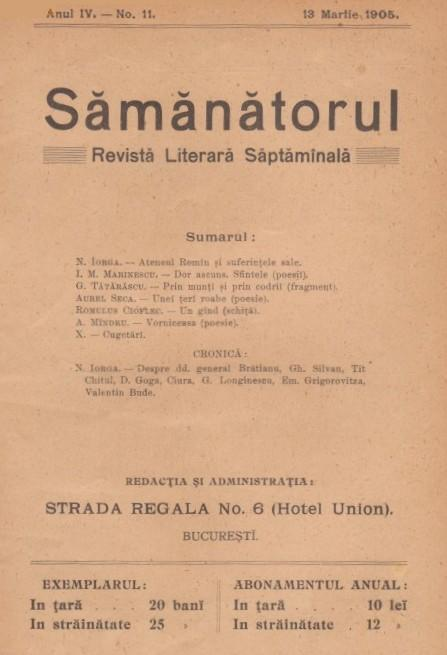
Cover of Sămănătorul, March 1905. The table of contents credits Iorga as an editorialist and political columnist

Also in 1903, Nicolae Iorga became one of the managers of Sămănătorul review. The moment brought Iorga's emancipation from Maiorescu's influence, his break with mainstream Junimism, and his affiliation to the traditionalist, ethno-nationalist and neoromantic current encouraged by the magazine. The Sămănătorist school was by then also grouping other former or active Junimists, and Maiorescu's progressive withdrawal from literary life also created a bridge with Convorbiri Literare: its new editor, Simion Mehedinți, was himself a theorist of traditionalism. A circle of Junimists more sympathetic to Maiorescu's version of conservatism reacted against this realignment by founding its own venue, Convorbiri Critice, edited by Mihail Dragomirescu.

In tandem with his full return to cultural and political journalism, which included prolonged debates with both the "old" historians and the Junimists, Iorga was still active at the forefront of historical research. In 1904, he published the historical geography work Drumuri și orașe din România ("Roads and Towns of Romania") and, upon the special request of National Liberal Education Minister Spiru Haret, a work dedicated to the celebrated Moldavian Prince Stephen the Great, published upon the 400th anniversary of the monarch's death as Istoria lui Ștefan cel Mare ("The History of Stephen the Great"). Iorga later confessed that the book was an integral part of his and Haret's didacticist agenda, supposed to be "spread to the very bottom of the country in thousands of copies". During those months, Iorga also helped discover novelist Mihail Sadoveanu, who was for a while the leading figure of Sămănătorist literature.

In 1905, the year when historian Onisifor Ghibu became his close friend and disciple, he followed up with over 23 individual titles, among them the two German-language volumes of Geschichte des Rümanischen Volkes im Rahmen seiner Staatsbildungen ("A History of the Romanian People within the Context of Its National Formation"), Istoria românilor în chipuri și icoane ("The History of the Romanians in Faces and Icons"), Sate și mănăstiri din România ("Villages and Monasteries of Romania") and the essay Gânduri și sfaturi ale unui om ca oricare altul ("Thoughts and Advices from a Man Just like Any Other"). He also paid a visit to the Romanians of Bukovina region, in Austrian territory, as well as to those of Bessarabia, who were subjects of the Russian Empire, and wrote about their cultural struggles in his 1905 accounts Neamul romănesc în Bucovina ("The Romanian People of Bukovina"), Neamul romănesc în Basarabia ("...of Bessarabia"). These referred to Tsarist autocracy as a source of "darkness and slavery", whereas the more liberal regime of Bukovina offered its subjects "golden chains".

Nicolae Iorga ran in the 1905 election and won a seat in Parliament's lower chamber. He remained politically independent until 1906, when he attached himself to the Conservative Party, making one final attempt to change the course of Junimism. His move was contrasted by the group of left-nationalists from the Poporanist faction, who were allied to the National Liberals and, soon after, in open conflict with Iorga. Although from the same cultural family as Sămănătorul, the Poporanist theorist Constantin Stere was dismissed by Iorga's articles, despite Sadoveanu's attempts to settle the matter.

A peak in Nicolae Iorga's own nationalist campaigning occurred that year: profiting from a wave of Francophobia among young urbanites, Iorga boycotted the National Theater, punishing its staff for staging a play entirely in French, and disturbing public order. According to one of Iorga's young disciples, the future journalist Pamfil Șeicaru, the mood was such that Iorga could have led a successful coup d'état. These events had several political consequences. The Siguranța Statului intelligence agency soon opened a file on the historian, informing Romanian Premier Sturdza about nationalist agitation. The perception that Iorga was a xenophobe also drew condemnation from more moderate traditionalist circles, in particular the Viața Literară weekly. Its panelists, Ilarie Chendi and young Eugen Lovinescu, ridiculed Iorga's claim of superiority; Chendi in particular criticized the rejection of writers based on their ethnic origin and not their ultimate merit (while alleging, to Iorga's annoyance, that Iorga himself was a Greek).

=== Neamul Românesc, Peasants' Revolt and Vălenii de Munte ===
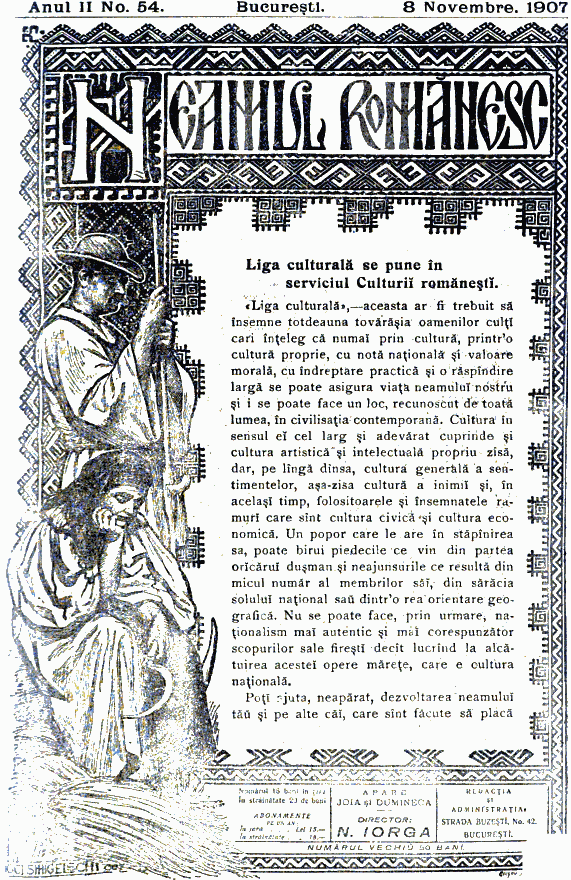
Cover of Neamul Românesc, November 1907

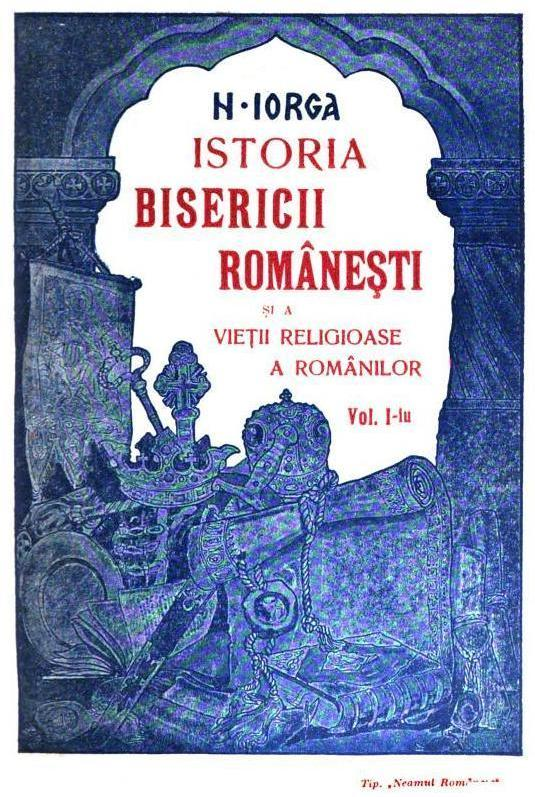
Istoria bisericii românești, original edition

Iorga eventually parted with Sămănătorul in late 1906, moving on to set up his own tribune, Neamul Românesc. The schism was allegedly a direct result of his conflicts with other literary venues, and inaugurated a brief collaboration between Iorga and Făt Frumos journalist Emil Gârleanu. The newer magazine, illustrated with idealized portraits of the Romanian peasant, was widely popular with Romania's rural intelligentsia (among which it was freely distributed), promoting antisemitic theories and raising opprobrium from the authorities and the urban-oriented press.

Also in 1906, Iorga traveled into the Ottoman Empire, visiting Istanbul, and published another set of volumes—Contribuții la istoria literară ("Contributions to Literary History"), Neamul românesc în Ardeal și Țara Ungurească ("The Romanian Nation in Transylvania and the Hungarian Land"), Negoțul și meșteșugurile în trecutul românesc ("Trade and Crafts of the Romanian Past") etc. In 1907, he began issuing a second periodical, the cultural magazine Floarea Darurilor, and published with Editura Minerva an early installment of his companion to Romanian literature (second volume 1908, third volume 1909). His published scientific contributions for that year include, among others, an English-language study on the Byzantine Empire. At home, he and pupil Vasile Pârvan were involved in a conflict with fellow historian Orest Tafrali, officially over archaeological theory, but also because of a regional conflict in academia: Bucharest and Transylvania against Tafrali's Iași.

A seminal moment in Iorga's political career took place during the 1907 Romanian Peasants' Revolt, erupting under a Conservative cabinet and repressed with much violence by a National Liberal one. The bloody outcome prompted the historian to author and make public a piece of social critique, the Neamul Românesc pamphlet Dumnezeu să-i ierte ("God Forgive Them"). The text, together with his program of agrarian conferences and his subscription lists for the benefit of victims' relatives again made him an adversary of the National Liberals, who referred to Iorga as an instigator. The historian did however struck a chord with Stere, who had been made prefect of Iași County, and who, going against his party's wishes, inaugurated an informal collaboration between Iorga and the Poporanists. The political class as a whole was particularly apprehensive of Iorga's contacts with the League for the Cultural Unity of All Romanians and their common irredentist agenda, which risked undermining relations with the Austrians over Transylvania and Bukovina. However, Iorga's popularity was still increasing, and, carried by this sentiment, he was first elected to Chamber during the elections of that same year.

Iorga and his new family had relocated several times, renting a home in Bucharest's Gara de Nord (Buzești) quarter. After renewed but failed attempts to become an Iași University professor, he decided, in 1908, to set his base away from the urban centers, at a villa in Vălenii de Munte town (nestled in the remote hilly area of Prahova County). Although branded an agitator by Sturdza, he received support in this venture from Education Minister Haret. Once settled, Iorga set up a specialized summer school, his own publishing house, a printing press and the literary supplement of Neamul Românesc, as well as an asylum managed by writer Constanța Marino-Moscu. He published some 25 new works for that year, such as the introductory volumes for his German-language companion to Ottoman history (Geschichte des Osmanischen Reiches, "History of the Ottoman Empire"), a study on Romanian Orthodox institutions (Istoria bisericii românești, "The History of the Romanian Church"), and an anthology on Romanian Romanticism. He followed up in 1909 with a volume of parliamentary speeches, În era reformelor ("In the Age of Reforms"), a book on the 1859 Moldo–Wallachian Union (Unirea principatelor, "The Principalities' Union"), and a critical edition of poems by Eminescu. Visiting Iași for the Union Jubilee, Iorga issued a public and emotional apology to Xenopol for having criticized him in the previous decade.

=== 1909 setbacks and PND creation ===
At that stage in his life, Iorga became an honorary member of the Romanian Writers' Society. He had militated for its creation in both Sămănătorul and Neamul Românesc, but also wrote against its system of fees. Once liberated from government restriction in 1909, his Vălenii school grew into a hub of student activity, self-financed through the sale of postcards. Its success caused alarm in Austria-Hungary: Budapesti Hírlap newspaper described Iorga's school as an instrument for radicalizing Romanian Transylvanians. Iorga also alienated the main Romanian organizations in Transylvania: the Romanian National Party (PNR) dreaded his proposal to boycott the Diet of Hungary, particularly since PNR leaders were contemplating a loyalist "Greater Austria" devolution project.

The consequences hit Iorga in May 1909, when he was stopped from visiting Bukovina, officially branded a persona non grata, and expelled from Austrian soil (in June, it was made illegal for Bukovinian schoolteachers to attend Iorga's lectures). A month later, Iorga greeted in Bucharest the English scholar R.W. Seton-Watson. This noted critic of Austria-Hungary became Iorga's admiring friend, and helped popularize his ideas in the English-speaking world.

In 1910, the year when he toured the Old Kingdom's conference circuit, Nicolae Iorga again rallied with Cuza to establish the explicitly antisemitic Democratic Nationalist Party. Partly building on the antisemitic component of the 1907 revolts, its doctrines depicted the Jewish-Romanian community and Jews in general as a danger for Romania's development. During its early decades, it used as its symbol the right-facing swastika (卐), promoted by Cuza as the symbol of worldwide antisemitism and, later, of the "Aryans". Also known as PND, this was Romania's first political group to represent the petty bourgeoisie, using its votes to challenge the tri-decennial two-party system.

Also in 1910, Iorga published some thirty new works, covering gender history (Viața femeilor în trecutul românesc, "The Early Life of Romanian Women"), Romanian military history (Istoria armatei românești, "The History of the Romanian Military") and Stephen the Great's Orthodox profile (Ștefan cel Mare și mănăstirea Neamțului, "Stephen the Great and Neamț Monastery"). His academic activity also resulted in a lengthy conflict with art historian Alexandru Tzigara-Samurcaș, his godfather and former friend, sparked when Iorga, defending his own academic postings, objected to making Art History a separate subject at university.

Reinstated into the academy and made a full member, he gave his May 1911 reception speech with a philosophy of history subject (Două concepții istorice, "Two Historical Outlooks") and was introduced on the occasion by Xenopol. In August of that year, he was again in Transylvania, at Blaj, where he paid homage to the Romanian-run ASTRA Cultural Society. He made his first contribution to Romanian drama with the play centered on, and named after, Michael the Brave (Mihai Viteazul), one of around twenty new titles for that year—alongside his collected aphorisms (Cugetări, "Musings") and a memoir of his life in culture (Oameni cari au fost, "People Who Are Gone"). In 1912, he published, among other works, Trei drame ("Three Dramatic Plays"), grouping Mihai Viteazul, Învierea lui Ștefan cel Mare ("Stephen the Great's Resurrection") and Un domn pribeag ("An Outcast Prince"). Additionally, Iorga produced the first of several studies dealing with Balkan geopolitics in the charged context leading up to the Balkan Wars (România, vecinii săi și chestia Orientală, "Romania, Her Neighbors and the Eastern Question"). He also made a noted contribution to ethnography, with Portul popular românesc ("Romanian Folk Dress").

=== Iorga and the Balkan crisis ===
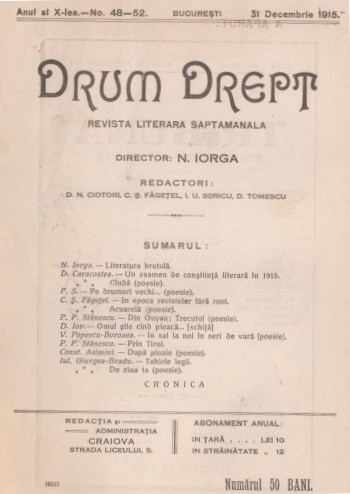
Cover of Drum Drept, issue no. 48–52, dated 31 December 1915

In 1913, Iorga was in London for an International Congress of History, presenting a proposal for a new approach to medievalism and a paper discussing the sociocultural effects of the fall of Constantinople on Moldavia and Wallachia. He was later in the Kingdom of Serbia, invited by the Belgrade Academy and presenting dissertations on Romania–Serbia relations and the Ottoman decline. Iorga was even called under arms in the Second Balkan War, during which Romania fought alongside Serbia and against the Kingdom of Bulgaria. The subsequent taking of Southern Dobruja, supported by Maiorescu and the Conservatives, was seen by Iorga as callous and imperialistic.

Iorga's interest in the Balkan crisis was illustrated by two of the forty books he put out that year: Istoria statelor balcanice ("The History of Balkan States") and Notele unui istoric cu privire la evenimentele din Balcani ("A Historian's Notes on the Balkan Events"). Noted among the others is the study focusing on the early 18th century reign of Wallachian Prince Constantin Brâncoveanu (Viața și domnia lui Constantin vodă Brâncoveanu, "The Life and Rule of Prince Constantin Brâncoveanu"). That same year, Iorga issued the first series of his Drum Drept monthly, later merged with the Sămănătorist magazine Ramuri. Iorga managed to publish roughly as many new titles in 1914, the year when he received a Romanian Bene Merenti distinction, and inaugurated the international Institute of South-East European Studies or ISSEE (founded through his efforts), with a lecture on Albanian history.

Again invited to Italy, he spoke at the Ateneo Veneto on the relations between the Republic of Venice and the Balkans, and again about Settecento culture. His attention was focused on the Albanians and Arbëreshë—Iorga soon discovered the oldest record of written Albanian, the 1462 Formula e pagëzimit. In 1916, he founded the Bucharest-based academic journal Revista Istorică ("The Historical Review"), a Romanian equivalent for Historische Zeitschrift and The English Historical Review.

=== Ententist profile ===
Nicolae Iorga's involvement in political disputes and the cause of Romanian irredentism became a leading characteristic of his biography during World War I. In 1915, while Romania was still keeping neutral, he sided with the dominant nationalist, Francophile and pro-Entente camp, urging for Romania to wage war on the Central Powers as a means of obtaining Transylvania, Bukovina and other regions held by Austria-Hungary; to this goal, he became an active member of the League for the Cultural Unity of All Romanians, and personally organized the large pro-Entente rallies in Bucharest. A prudent anti-Austrian, Iorga adopted the interventionist agenda with noted delay. His hesitation was ridiculed by hawkish Eugen Lovinescu as pro-Transylvanian but anti-war, costing Iorga his office in the Cultural League. The historian later confessed that, like Premier Ion I. C. Brătianu and the National Liberal cabinet, he had been waiting for a better moment to strike. In the end, his "Ententist" efforts were closely supported by public figures such as Alexandru I. Lapedatu and Ion Petrovici, as well as by Take Ionescu's National Action advocacy group. Iorga was also introduced to the private circle of Romania's young King, Ferdinand I, whom he found well-intentioned but weak-willed. Iorga is sometimes credited as a tutor to Crown Prince Carol (future King Carol II), who reportedly attended the Vălenii school.

In his October 1915 polemic with Vasile Sion, a Germanophile physician, Iorga at once justified suspicion of the German Romanians and praised those Romanians who were deserting the Austrian Army. The Ententists' focus on Transylvania pitted them against the Poporanists, who deplored the Romanians of Bessarabia. That region, the Poporanist lobby argued, was being actively oppressed by the Russian Empire with the acquiescence of other Entente powers. Poporanist theorist Garabet Ibrăileanu, editor of Viața Românească review, later accused Iorga of not ever speaking in support of the Bessarabians.

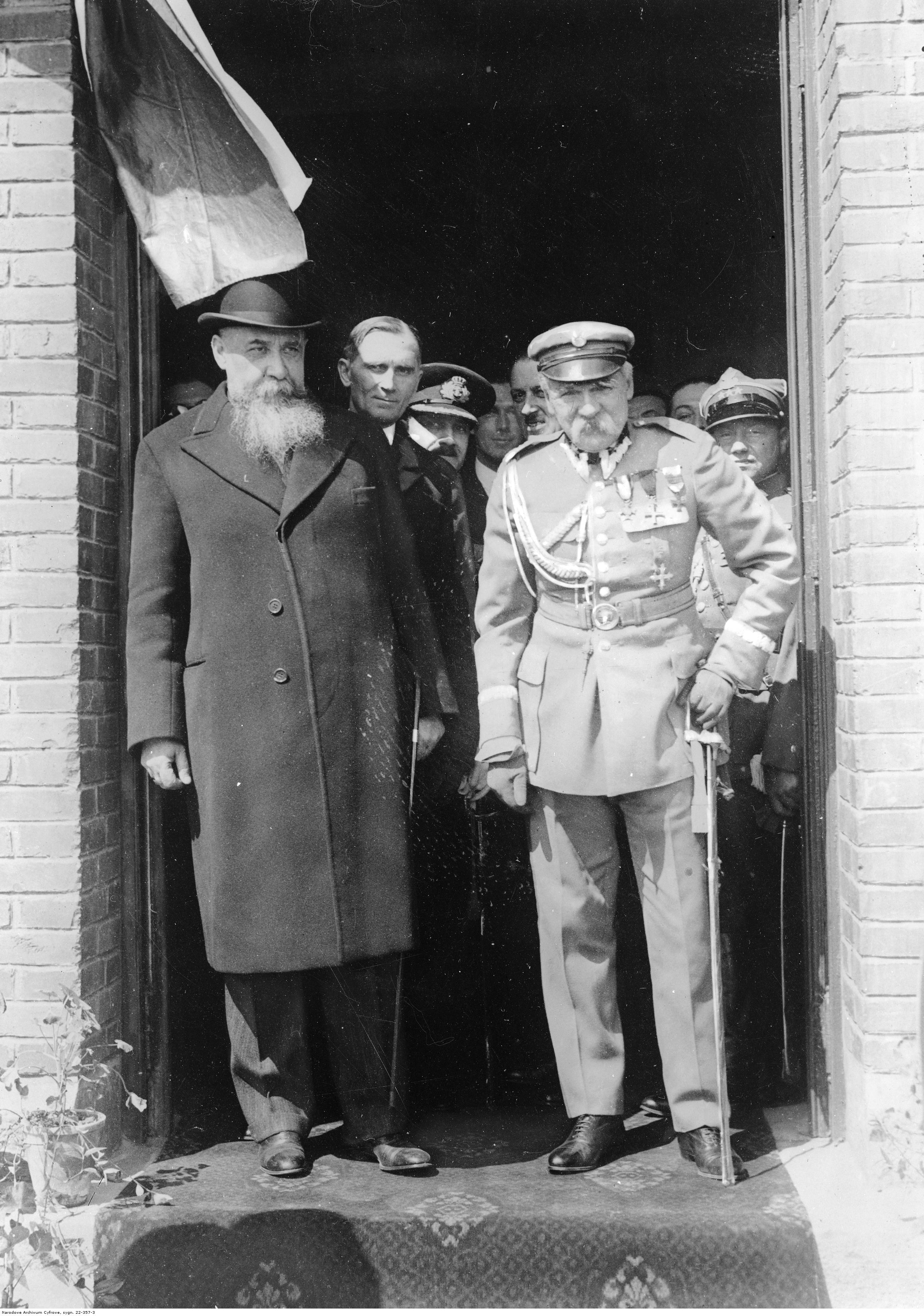
Nicolae Iorga with Polish president Józef Piłsudski in 1933

Political themes were again reflected in Nicolae Iorga's 1915 report to the academy (Dreptul la viață al statelor mici, "The Small States' Right to Exist") and in various of the 37 books he published that year: Istoria românilor din Ardeal și Ungaria ("The History of the Romanians in Transylvania and Hungary"), Politica austriacă față de Serbia ("The Austrian Policy on Serbia") etc. Also in 1915, Iorga completed his economic history treatise, Istoria comerțului la români ("The History of Commerce among the Romanians"), as well as a volume on literary history and Romanian philosophy, Faze sufletești și cărți reprezentative la români ("Spiritual Phases and Relevant Books of the Romanians"). Before spring 1916, he was commuting between Bucharest and Iași, substituting the ailing Xenopol at Iași University. He also gave a final touch to the collection Studii și documente ("Studies and Documents"), comprising his commentary on 30,000 individual documents and spread over 31 tomes.

=== Iași refuge ===
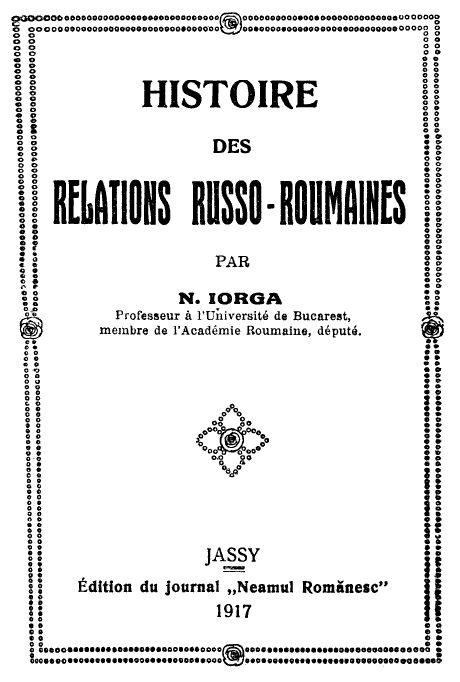
Iorga's essay on Romania–Russia relations, published in Iași, 1917

In late summer 1916, as Brătianu's government sealed an alliance with the Entente, Iorga expressed his joy in a piece named Ceasul ("The Hour"): "the hour we have been expecting for over two centuries, for which we have been living our entire national life, for which we have been working and writing, fighting and thinking, has at long last arrived." The Romanian campaign initially went well, as the Romanian Army penetrated deep into Transylvania, defeated the Austro-Hungarian Army and briefly occupied much of the region. However, following a massive counterattack on multiple fronts by the Central Powers, the campaign ended in massive defeat, forcing the Romanian Army and the entire administration to evacuate the southern areas, Bucharest included, in front of a German-led invasion. Iorga's home in Vălenii de Munte was among the property items left behind and seized by the occupiers, and, according to Iorga's own claim, was vandalized by the Deutsches Heer.

Still a member of Parliament, Iorga joined the authorities in the provisional capital of Iași, but opposed the plans of relocating government out of besieged Moldavia and into the Russian Republic. The argument was made in one of his parliamentary speeches, printed as a pamphlet and circulated among the military: "May the dogs of this world feast on us sooner than to find our happiness, tranquility and prosperity granted by the hostile foreigner." He did however allow some of his notebooks to be stored in Moscow, along with the Romanian Treasure, and sheltered his own family in Odessa.

Iorga, who reissued Neamul Românesc in Iași, resumed his activity at Iași University and began working on the war propaganda daily România, while contributing to R.W. Seton-Watson's international sheet The New Europe. His contribution for that year included a number of brochures dedicated to maintaining morale among soldiers and civilians: Războiul actual și urmările lui în viața morală a omenirii ("The Current War and Its Effects on the Moral Life of Mankind"), Rolul inițiativei private în viața publică ("The Role of Private Initiative in Public Life"), Sfaturi și învățături pentru ostașii României ("Advices and Teachings for Romania's Soldiers") etc. He also translated from English and printed My Country, a patriotic essay by Ferdinand's wife Marie of Edinburgh.

The heightened sense of crisis prompted Iorga to issue appeals against defeatism and reissue Neamul Românesc from Iași, explaining: "I realized at once what moral use could come out of this for the thousands of discouraged and disillusioned people and against the traitors who were creeping up all over the place." The goal was again reflected in his complementary lectures (where he discussed the "national principle") and a new set of works; these featured musings on the Allied commitment (Relations des Roumains avec les Alliès, "The Romanians' Relations with the Allies"; Histoire des relations entre la France et les roumains, "The History of Relations between France and the Romanians"), the national character (Sufletul românesc, "The Romanian Soul") or columns against the loss of morale (Armistițiul, "The Armistice"). His ideal of moral regeneration through the war effort came with an endorsement of land reform projects. Brătianu did not object to the idea, being however concerned that landowners would rebel. Iorga purportedly gave him a sarcastic reply: "just like you've been shooting the peasants to benefit the landowners, you'll then be shooting the landowners to benefit the peasants."

In May 1918, Romania yielded to German demands and negotiated the Bucharest Treaty, an effective armistice. The conditions were judged humiliating by Iorga ("Our ancestors would have preferred death"); he refused to regain his University of Bucharest chair. The German authorities in Bucharest reacted by blacklisting the historian.

=== Greater Romania's creation ===
Iorga only returned to Bucharest as Romania resumed its contacts with the Allies and the Deutsches Heer left the country. The political uncertainty ended by late autumn, when the Allied victory on the Western Front sealed Germany's defeat. Celebrating the Compiègne Armistice, Iorga wrote: "There can be no greater day for the entire world". Iorga however found that Bucharest had become "a filthy hell under lead skies." His celebrated return also included the premiere of Învierea lui Ștefan cel Mare at the National Theater, which continued to host productions of his dramatic texts on a regular basis, until ca. 1936.

He was reelected to the lower chamber in the June 1918 election, becoming President of the body and, due to the rapid political developments, the first person to hold this office in the history of Greater Romania. The year also brought his participation alongside Allied envoys in the 360th anniversary of Michael the Brave's birth. On 1 December, later celebrated as Great Union Day, Iorga was participant in a seminal event of the union with Transylvania, as one of several thousand Romanians who gathered in the Great National Assembly of Alba Iulia to demand union on the basis of self-determination. Despite these successes, Iorga was reportedly snubbed by King Ferdinand, and only left to rely on Brătianu for support. Although he was not invited to attend the Paris Peace Conference, he supported Queen Marie in her role of informal negotiator for Romania, and cemented his friendship with her.

Shortly after the creation of Greater Romania, Iorga was focusing his public activity on exposing collaborators of the wartime occupiers. The subject was central to a 1919 speech he held in front of the academy, where he obtained the public condemnation of actively Germanophile academicians, having earlier vetoed the membership of Poporanist Constantin Stere. He failed at enlisting support for the purge of Germanophile professors from university, but the attempt rekindled the feud between him and Alexandru Tzigara-Samurcaș, who had served in the German-appointed administration. The two scholars later took their battle to court and, until Iorga's death, presented mutually exclusive takes on recent political history. Although very much opposed to the imprisoned Germanophile poet Tudor Arghezi, Iorga intervened on his behalf with Ferdinand.

Following the November 1919 elections, Iorga became a member of the Senate, representing the Democratic Nationalists. Although he resented the universal male suffrage and viewed the adoption of electoral symbols as promoting political illiteracy, his PND came to use a logo representing two hands grasping (later replaced with a black-flag-and-sickle). The elections seemed to do away with the old political system: Iorga's party was third, trailing behind two newcomers, the Transylvanian PNR and the Poporanist Peasants' Party (PȚ), with whom it formed a parliamentary bloc supporting an Alexandru Vaida-Voevod cabinet. This union of former rivals also showed Iorga's growing suspicion of Brătianu, whom he feared intended to absorb the PND into the National Liberal Party, and accused of creating a political machine. He and his disciples were circulating the term politicianism ("politicking"), expressing their disappointment for the new political context.

Also in 1919, Iorga was elected chairman of the Cultural League, where he gave a speech on "the Romanians' rights to their national territory", was appointed head of the Historical Monuments' Commission, and met the French academic mission to Romania (Henri Mathias Berthelot, Charles Diehl, Emmanuel de Martonne and Raymond Poincaré, whom he greeted with a speech about the Romanians and the Romance peoples). Together with French war hero Septime Gorceix, he also compiled Anthologie de la littérature roumaine ("An Anthology of Romanian Literature"). That year, the French state granted Iorga its Legion of Honor.

A founding president of the Association of Romanian Public Libraries, Iorga was also tightening his links with young Transylvanian intellectuals: he took part in reorganizing the Cluj Franz Joseph University into a Romanian-speaking institution, meeting scholars Vasile Pârvan and Vasile Bogrea (who welcomed him as "our protective genius"), and published a praise of the young traditionalist poet Lucian Blaga. He was in correspondence with intellectuals of all backgrounds, and, reportedly, the Romanian who was addressed the most letters in postal history. Touring the larger conference circuit, he also wrote some 30 new books, among them: Histoire des roumains de la Peninsule des Balcans ("The History of Romanians from the Balkan Peninsula": Aromanians, Istro-Romanians and Megleno-Romanians), Istoria poporului francez ("The History of the French people"), Pentru sufletele celor ce muncesc ("For The Souls of Working Men"), and Istoria lui Mihai Viteazul ("The History of Michael the Brave"). Iorga was awarded the title of doctor honoris causa by the University of Strasbourg, while his lectures on Albania, collected by poet Lasgush Poradeci, became Brève histoire de l'Albanie ("Concise History of Albania"). In Bucharest, Iorga received as a gift from his admirers a new Bucharest home on Bonaparte Highway (Iancu de Hunedoara Boulevard).

=== Early 1920s politics ===
Iorga's parliamentary bloc crumbled in late March 1920, when Ferdinand dissolved Parliament. During the spring 1920 election, Iorga was invited by journalist Sever Dan to run for a deputy seat in Transylvania, but eventually participated in and won the election of his earlier constituency, Covurlui County. At that stage, Iorga was resenting the PNR for holding onto its regional government of Transylvania, and criticizing the PȚ for its claim to represent all Romanian peasants. In March 1921, Iorga again turned on Stere. The latter had since been forgiven for his wartime stance, decorated for negotiating the Bessarabian union, and elected on PȚ lists in Soroca County. Iorga's speech, "Stere's Betrayal", turned attention back to Stere's Germanophilia (with quotes that were supposedly taken out of context) and demanded his invalidation—the subsequent debate was tense and emotional, but a new vote in Chamber confirmed Stere as Soroca deputy.

The overall election victory belonged to the radical, eclectic and anti-PNR People's Party, led by war hero Alexandru Averescu. Iorga, whose PND had formed the Federation of National Democracy with the PȚ and other parties, was perplexed by Averescu's sui generis appeal and personality cult, writing: "Everything [in that party] was about Averescu." His partner Cuza and a portion of the PND were however supportive of this force, which threatened the stability of their vote. Progressively after that moment, Iorga also began toning down his antisemitism, a process of the end of which Cuza left the Democratic Nationalists to establish the more militant National-Christian Defense League (1923). Iorga's suggestions that new arrivals from Transylvania and Bessarabia were becoming a clique also resulted in collisions with former friend Octavian Goga, who had joined up with Averescu's party.

His publishing activity continued at a steady pace during that year, when he first presided over the Romanian School of Fontenay-aux-Roses; he issued the two volumes of Histoire des roumains et de leur civilisation ("The History of the Romanians and Their Civilization") and the three tomes of Istoria românilor prin călătorii ("The History of the Romanians in Travels"), alongside Ideea Daciei românești ("The Idea of a Romanian Dacia"), Istoria Evului Mediu ("The History of the Middle Ages") and some other scholarly works. His biographical studies were mainly focused on his nationalist predecessor Mihail Kogălniceanu. Iorga also resumed his writing for the stage, with two new drama plays: one centered on the Moldavian ruler Constantin Cantemir (Cantemir bătrânul, "Cantemir the Elder"), the other dedicated to, and named after, Brâncoveanu. Centering his activity as a public speaker in Transylvanian cities, Iorga was also involved in projects to organize folk theaters throughout the country, through which he intended to spread a unified cultural message. The year also brought his presence at the funeral of A. D. Xenopol.

In 1921 and 1922, the Romanian scholar began lecturing abroad, most notably at the University of Paris, while setting up a Romanian School in the French capital and the Accademia di Romania of Rome. In 1921, when his 50th birthday was celebrated at a national level, Iorga published a large number of volumes, including a bibliographic study on the Wallachian uprising of 1821 and its leader Tudor Vladimirescu, an essay on political history (Dezvoltarea așezămintelor politice, "The Development of Political Institutions"), Secretul culturii franceze ("The Secret of French culture"), Războiul nostru în note zilnice ("Our War as Depicted in Daily Records") and the French-language Les Latins de l'Orient ("The Oriental Latins"). His interest in Vladimirescu and his historical role was also apparent in an eponymous play, published with a volume of Iorga's selected lyric poetry.

In politics, Iorga began objecting to the National Liberals' hold on power, denouncing the 1922 election as a fraud. He resumed his close cooperation with the PNR, briefly joining the party ranks in an attempt to counter this monopoly. In 1923, he donated his Bonaparte Highway residence and its collection to the Ministry of Education, to be used by a cultural foundation and benefit university students. Receiving another honoris causa doctorate, from the University of Lyon, Iorga went through an episode of reconciliation with Tudor Arghezi, who addressed him public praise. The two worked together on Cuget Românesc newspaper, but were again at odds when Iorga began criticizing modernist literature and "the world's spiritual crisis".

Among his published works for that year were Formes byzantines et réalités balcaniques ("Byzantine Forms and Balkan Realities"), Istoria presei românești ("The History of the Romanian Press"), L'Art populaire en Roumanie ("Folk Art in Romania"), Istoria artei medievale ("The History of Medieval art") and Neamul românesc din Ardeal ("The Romanian Nation in Transylvania"). Iorga had by then finished several new theatrical plays: Moartea lui Dante ("The Death of Dante"), Molière se răzbună ("Molière Gets His Revenge"), Omul care ni trebuie ("The Man We Need") and Sărmală, amicul poporului ("Sărmală, Friend of the People").

=== International initiatives and American journey ===
Title page of Iorga's Histoire des états balcaniques jusqu'a 1924 (1925)

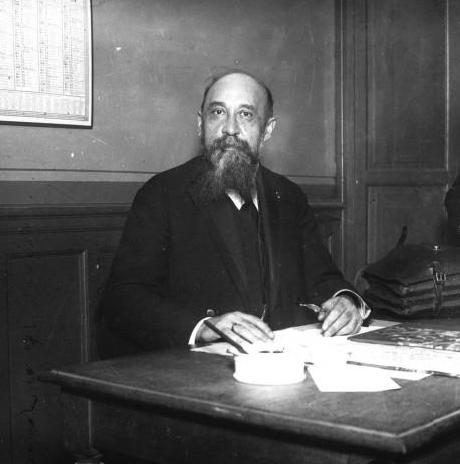
Iorga in Versailles, 1928 photograph

A major moment in Iorga's European career took place in 1924, when he convened in Bucharest the first-ever International Congress of Byzantine Studies, attended by some of the leading experts in the field. He also began lecturing at Ramiro Ortiz's Italian Institute in Bucharest. Also then, Iorga was appointed Aggregate Professor by the University of Paris, received the honor of having foreign scholars lecturing at the Vălenii de Munte school, and published a number of scientific works and essays, such as: Brève histoire des croissades ("A Short History of the Crusades"), Cărți reprezentative din viața omenirii ("Books Significant for Mankind's Existence"), România pitorească ("Picturesque Romania") and a volume of addresses to the Romanian American community. In 1925, when he was elected a member of the Kraków Academy of Learning in Poland, Iorga gave conferences in various European countries, including Switzerland (where he spoke at a League of Nations assembly on the state of Romania's minorities). His bibliography for 1925 includes some 50 titles. Iorga also increased his personal fortune, constructing villas in two resort towns: in Sinaia (designer: Toma T. Socolescu) and, later, Mangalia. More controversial still was his decision to use excess funds from the International Congress to improve his Vălenii printing press.

Iorga was again abroad in 1926 and 1927, lecturing on various subjects at reunions in France, Italy, Switzerland, Denmark, Spain, Sweden and the Kingdom of Yugoslavia, many of his works being by then translated into French, English, German and Italian. His work for 1926 centered on the first of four volumes in his series Essai de synthèse de l'histoire de l'humanité ("Essay on the Synthesis of World History"), followed in 1927 by Istoria industriei la români ("The History of Industry among the Romanians"), Originea și sensul democrației ("The Origin and Sense of Democracy"), a study of Romanian contributions to the 1877–1878 Russo-Turkish War (Războiul de independență, "The War of Independence") etc. At home, the PND's merge into the PNR, accepted by Iorga, was stopped once the historian asked to become the resulting union's chief. Acting PNR leader Iuliu Maniu successfully resisted this move, and the two parties split over the issue.

For a while in 1927, Iorga was also local leader of the Pan-European movement, created internationally by Graf Coudenhove-Kalergi. A honoris causa doctor of Genoa University, he opened his course at the University of Paris with lectures on France's Levantine policy (1927) and, during 1928, was again invited to lecture in Spain, Sweden and Norway. His published works for that time grouped the political essay Evoluția ideii de libertate ("The Evolution of Liberty as an Idea"), new historical studies and printed versions of his conferences: Istoria învățământului ("The History of Education"), Patru conferințe despre istoria Angliei ("Four Conferences on the History of England"), Țara latină cea mai îndepărtată din Europa: Portugalia ("The Remotest Latin Country in Europe: Portugal"). In addition to his Bucharest Faculty of History chair, Iorga also took over the History of Literature course hosted by the same institution (1928).

Appointed the university's Rector in 1929, he followed up with new sets of conferences in France, Italy or Spain, and published some 40 new books on topics such as Romanian folklore and Scandinavian history. For a while, he also held the university's concise literature course, replacing Professor Ioan Bianu. Iorga's circle was joined by researcher Constantin C. Giurescu, son of historian Constantin Giurescu, who had been Iorga's rival a generation before.

Iorga embarked on a longer journey during 1930: again lecturing in Paris during January, he left for Genoa and, from there, traveled to the United States, visiting some 20 cities, being greeted by the Romanian-American community and meeting with President Herbert Hoover. He was also an honored guest of Case Western Reserve University, where he delivered a lecture in English. Returning to attend the London International Congress of History, Iorga was also made a honoris causa doctor by the University of Oxford (with a reception speech likening him to both Livy and Pliny the Elder). That year, he also set up the Casa Romena institute in Venice. His new works included America și românii din America ("Romania and the Romanians of America") and Priveliști elvețiene ("Swiss Landscapes"), alongside the plays Sfântul Francisc ("Saint Francis") and Fiul cel pierdut ("The Lost Son"). In 1931–1932, he was made a honoris causa doctor by four other universities (the University of Paris, La Sapienza, Stefan Batory, Comenius), was admitted into both Accademia dei Lincei and the Accademia degli Arcadi, and published over 40 new titles per year.

=== Prime minister ===
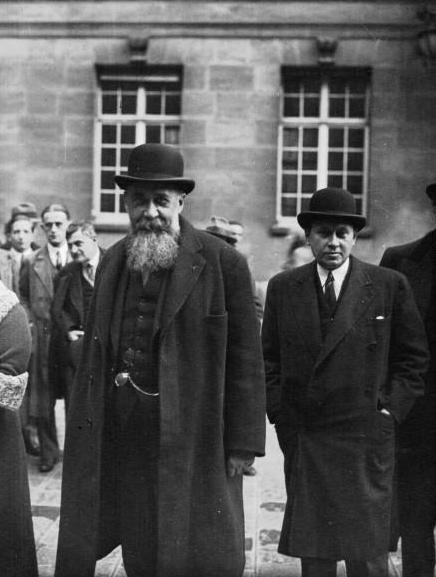
Iorga at the University of Paris, receiving his Honoris Causa Doctorate

Iorga became Romanian Premier in April 1931, upon the request of Carol II, who had returned from exile to replace his own son, Michael I. The authoritarian monarch had cemented this relationship by visiting the Vălenii de Munte establishment in July 1930. A contemporary historian, Hugh Seton-Watson (son of R.W. Seton-Watson), documented Carol's confiscation of agrarian politics for his own benefit, noting: "Professor Iorga's immense vanity delivered him into the king's hands." Iorga's imprudent ambition is mentioned by cultural historian Z. Ornea, who also counts Iorga among those who had already opposed Carol's invalidation. In short while, Iorga's support for the controversial monarch resulted in his inevitable break with the PNR and PȚ. Their agrarian union, the National Peasants' Party (PNȚ), took distance from Carol's policies, whereas Iorga prioritized his "Carlist" monarchism. Iorga wilfully rejected PNȚ policies. There was a running personal rivalry between him and PNȚ leader Iuliu Maniu, even though Iorga had on his side Maniu's own brother, lawyer Cassiu Maniu.

Once confirmed on the throne, Carol experimented with technocracy, borrowing professionals from various political groups, and closely linking Iorga with Internal Affairs Minister Constantin Argetoianu. Iorga survived the election of June, in which he led a National Union coalition, with support from his rivals, the National Liberals. During his short term, he traveled throughout the country, visiting around 40 cities and towns, and was notably on a state visit to France, being received by Prime Minister Aristide Briand and by Briand's ally André Tardieu. In recognition of his merits as an Albanologist, the Albanian Kingdom granted Iorga property in Sarandë town, on which the scholar created a Romanian Archaeological Institute.

The backdrop to Iorga's mandate was Carol's conflict with the Iron Guard, an increasingly popular fascist organization. In March 1932, Iorga signed a decree outlawing the movement, the beginning of his clash with the Guard's founder Corneliu Zelea Codreanu. At the same time, his new education law enhancing university autonomy, for which Iorga had been campaigning since the 1920s, was openly challenged as unrealistic by fellow scholar Florian Ștefănescu-Goangă, who noted that it only encouraged political agitators to place themselves outside the state. Also holding the office of Education Minister, he allowed auditing students to attend university lectures without holding a Romanian Baccalaureate degree. Reserving praise for the home-grown youth movement Micii Dorobanți, he was also an official backer of Romanian Scouting. In addition, Iorga's time in office brought the creation of another popular summer school, in the tourist resort of Balcic, Southern Dobruja.

The major issue facing Iorga was the economic crisis, part of the Great Depression, and he was largely unsuccessful in tackling it. To the detriment of financial markets, the cabinet tried to implement debt relief for bankrupt land cultivators, and signed an agreement with Argentina, another exporter of agricultural produce, to try to limit deflation. The mishandling of economic affairs made the historian a target of derision and indignation among the general public. The reduction of deficit with pay cuts for all state employees ("sacrificial curves") or selective layoffs was particularly dramatic, leading to widespread disillusionment among the middle class, which only increased grassroots support for the Iron Guard. Other controversial aspects were his alleged favoritism and nepotism: perceived as the central figure of an academic clique, Iorga helped Gheorghe Bogdan-Duică's family and Pârvan, promoted young historian Andrei Oțetea, and made his son in law Colonel Chirescu (m. Florica Iorga in 1918) a Prefect of Storojineț County. His premiership also evidenced the growing tensions between the PND in Bucharest and its former allies in Transylvania: Iorga arrived to power after rumors of a PNȚ "Transylvanian conspiracy", and his cabinet included no Romanian Transylvanian politicians. It was however open to members of the Saxon community, and Iorga himself created a new government position for ethnic minority affairs.

Nicolae Iorga presented his cabinet's resignation in May 1932, returning to academic life. This came after an understanding between Carol II and a rightist PNȚ faction, who took over with Alexandru Vaida-Voevod as Premier. The PND, running in elections under a square-in-square logo (回), was rapidly becoming a minor force in Romanian politics. It survived through alliances with the National Liberals or with Averescu, while Argetoianu left it to establish an equally small agrarian group. Iorga concentrated on redacting memoirs, published as Supt trei regi ("Under Three Kings"), whereby he intended to counter political hostility. He also created the Museum of Sacred Art, housed by the Crețulescu Palace.

=== Mid-1930s conflicts ===
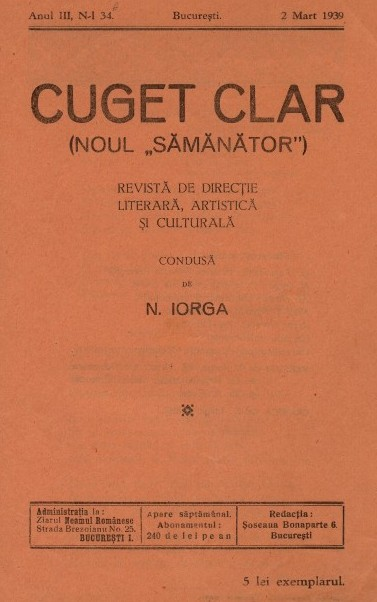
Cover of Cuget Clar, issue no. 34, dated 2 March 1939

The political conflicts were by then reflected in Iorga's academic life: Iorga was becoming strongly opposed to a new generation of professional historians, which included Giurescu the younger, P. P. Panaitescu and Gheorghe Brătianu. At the core, it was a scientific dispute: all three historians, grouped around the new Revista Istorică Română, found Iorga's studies to be speculative, politicized or needlessly didactic in their conclusions. The political discrepancy was highlighted by the more radical support these academics were directing toward King Carol II. In later years, Iorga also feuded with his Transylvanian disciple Lucian Blaga, trying in vain to block Blaga's reception to the academy over differences in philosophy and literary preference. On Blaga's side, the quarrel involved philologist and civil servant Bazil Munteanu; his correspondence with Blaga features hostile remarks about Iorga's "vulgarity" and cultural politics.

On his way to a pan-European congress, Iorga stirred further controversy by attending, in Rome, the tenth anniversary of the 1922 March, celebrating Italian Fascism. He resumed his participation in conference cycles during 1933, revisiting France, as well as taking back his position at the University of Bucharest; he published another 37 books and, in August 1933, attended the History Congress in Warsaw. His new project was a cultural version of the Polish–Romanian alliance, working together with poet-diplomat Aron Cotruș to increase awareness of his country, and publishing his own work in the Polish press.

Early in 1934, Iorga issued a condemnation of the Iron Guard, following the assassination of National Liberal Premier Ion G. Duca by a Legionary death squad. However, during the subsequent police round-ups of Guardist activists, Iorga intervened for the release of fascist philosopher Nae Ionescu, and still invited Guardist poet Radu Gyr to lecture at Vălenii. At the same time, he was again focusing his attention on the condemnation of modernists and the poetry of Arghezi, first with the overview Istoria literaturii românești contemporane ("History of Contemporary Romanian Literature"), then with his press polemics. Also in 1934, Iorga also published a book which coined his image of Romania's early modern culture—Byzance après Byzance ("Byzantium after Byzantium"), alongside the three-volume Histoire de la vie byzantine ("A History of Byzantine Life"). He followed up with a volume of memoirs Orizonturile mele. O viață de om așa cum a fost ("My Horizons. The Life of a Man as It Was"), while inaugurating his contribution to Romania's official cultural magazine, Revista Fundațiilor Regale.

Iorga again toured Europe in 1935, and, upon his return to Romania, gave a new set of conferences under the auspices of the Cultural League, inviting scholar Franz Babinger to lecture at the ISSEE. Again in Iași, the historian participated in a special celebration of 18th century Moldavian Prince and Enlightenment thinker Dimitrie Cantemir, whose remains had been retrieved from the Soviet Union to be reburied in the Romanian city. Among the books Iorga published in 1935 are a new version of Istoria lui Mihai Viteazul, alongside Originalitatea lui Dimitrie Cantemir ("Dimitrie Cantemir's Originality"), Comemorarea unirii Ardealului ("The Commemoration of Transylvania's Union") and two volumes of his Memorii ("Memoirs"). His additional essays covered the careers of 17th century intellectuals (Anthim the Iberian, Axinte Uricariul, Constantin Cantacuzino). Also in 1935, Iorga and his daughter Liliana co-authored a Bucharest guide book.

Early in 1936, Nicolae Iorga was again lecturing at the University of Paris, and gave an additional conference at the Société des études historiques, before hosting the Bucharest session of the International Committee of Historians. He was also in the Netherlands, with a lecture on Byzantine social history: L'Homme byzantin ("Byzantine Man"). Upon his return, wishing to renew his campaign against the modernists, Iorga founded Cuget Clar, the neo-Sămănătorist magazine.

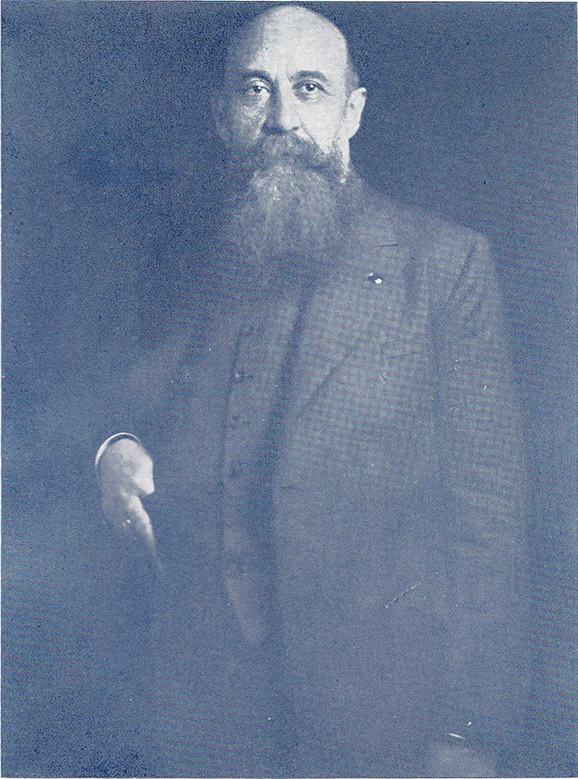
Nicolae Iorga in 1930

By that moment in time, he was publicly voicing his concern that Transylvania was a target of expansion for Regency-period Hungary, while cautioning the public against Nazi Germany and its revanchism. Similarly, he was concerned about the Soviet threat and the fate of Romanians in the Soviet Union, working closely with the Transnistrian anti-communist refugee Nichita Smochină. Such worries were notably expressed by Iorga in a series of Bucharest Radio broadcasts, Sfaturi pe întuneric ("Advice at Dark", soon after published in brochure format). He completed several new volumes, among which were Dovezi despre conștiința originii românilor ("Evidence on the Conscious Origin of the Romanians"), the polemical essay Lupta mea contra prostiei ("My Fight against Stupidity"), and the first two volumes of the long planned Istoria românilor.

=== 1937 retirement and Codreanu trials ===
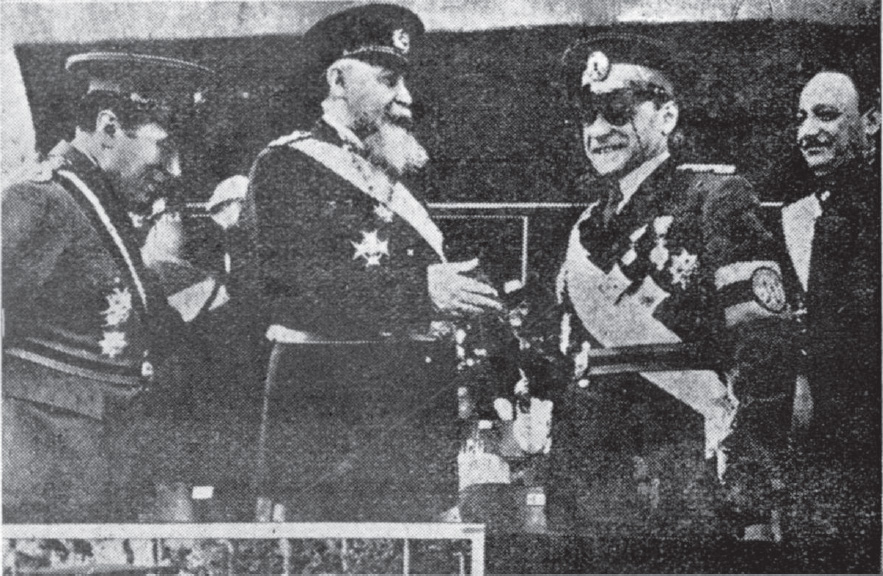
Crown Councillor Iorga and Prime Minister Armand Călinescu in National Renaissance Front uniforms (10 May 1939)

Nicolae Iorga was officially honored in 1937, when Carol II inaugurated a Bucharest Museum of World History, placed under the ISSEE director's presidency. However, the publicized death threats he received from the Iron Guard eventually prompted Iorga to retire from his university position. He withdrew to Vălenii de Munte, but was still active on the academic scene, lecturing on "the development of the human spirit" at the World History Institute, and being received as a corresponding member into Chile's Academy of History. He also mentored German biographer Eugen Wolbe, who collected data on the Romanian kings. This contribution was doubled by a steady participation in the country's political life. Iorga attended the Cultural League congress in Iași, where he openly demanded for the Iron Guard to be outlawed on the grounds that it served Nazi interests, and discussed the threat of war in his speeches at Vălenii de Munte and his Radio conferences. With his Neamul Românesc disciple N. Georgescu-Cocoș, he was also continuing his fight against modernism, inspiring a special Romanian Academy report on the modernists' "pornography".

The early months of 1938 saw Nicolae Iorga joining the national unity government of Miron Cristea, formed by Carol II's right-wing power base. A Crown Councillor, he then threw his reluctant support behind the National Renaissance Front, created by Carol II as the driving force of a pro-fascist but anti-Guard one-party state (see 1938 Constitution of Romania). Iorga was upset by the imposition of uniforms on all public officials, calling it "tyrannical", and privately ridiculed the new constitutional regime's architects, but he eventually complied to the changes. In April, Iorga was also at the center of a scandal which resulted in Codreanu's arrest and eventual extrajudicial killing. By then, the historian had attacked the Guard's policy of setting up small commercial enterprises and charity ventures. This prompted Codreanu to address him an open letter, which accused Iorga of being dishonest. Premier Armand Călinescu, who had already ordered a clampdown on Guardist activities, seized Iorga's demand for satisfaction as an opportunity, ordering Carol's rival to be tried for libel—the preamble to an extended trial on grounds of conspiracy. An unexpected consequence of this move was the protest resignation of General Ion Antonescu from the office of Defense Minister.

Iorga himself refused to attend the trial; in letters he addressed to the judges, he asked the count of libel to be withdrawn, and advised that Codreanu should follow the insanity defense on the other accusations. Iorga's attention then moved to other activities: he was Romanian Commissioner for the 1938 Venice Biennale, and supportive of the effort to establish a Romanian school of genealogists.

In 1939, as the Guard's campaign of retribution had degenerated into terrorism, Iorga used the Senate tribune to address the issue and demand measures to curb the violence. He was absent for part of the year, again lecturing in Paris. Steadily publishing new volumes of Istoria românilor, he also completed work on several other books: in 1938, Întru apărarea graniței de Apus ("For the Defense of the Western Frontier"), Cugetare și faptă germană ("German Thought and Action"), Hotare și spații naționale ("National Borders and Spaces"); in 1939 Istoria Bucureștilor ("History of Bucharest"), Discursuri parlamentare ("Parliamentary Addresses"), Istoria universală văzută prin literatură ("World History as Seen through Literature"), Naționaliști și frontiere ("Nationalists and Frontiers"), Stări sufletești și războaie ("Spiritual States and Wars"), Toate poeziile lui N. Iorga ("N. Iorga's Complete Poetry") and two new volumes of Memorii. Also in 1938, Iorga inaugurated the open-air theater of Vălenii de Munte with one of his own dramatic texts, Răzbunarea pământului ("The Earth's Revenge"). The total number of titles he presented for publishing in 1939 is 45, including a play about Christina of Sweden (Regele Cristina, "King C[h]ristina") and an anti-war cycle of poems. Some of his Anglophile essays were printed by Mihail Fărcășanu in Rumanian Quarterly, which sought to preserve Anglo–Romanian cooperation.

Iorga was again Romanian Commissioner of the Venice Biennale in 1940. The accelerated political developments led him to focus on his activities as a militant and journalist. His output for 1940 included a large number of conferences and articles dedicated to the preservation of Greater Romania's borders and the anti-Guardist cause: Semnul lui Cain ("The Mark of Cain"), Ignoranța stăpâna lumii ("Ignorance, Mistress of the World"), Drumeț în calea lupilor ("A Wayfarer Facing Wolves") etc. Iorga was troubled by the outbreak of World War II and saddened by the fall of France, events which formed the basis of his essay Amintiri din locurile tragediilor actuale ("Recollections from the Current Scenes of a Tragedy"). He was also working on a version of Prometheus Bound, a tragedy which probably reflected his concern about Romania, her allies, and the uncertain political future.

== Death ==
The year 1940 saw the collapse of Carol II's regime. The unexpected cession of Bessarabia to the Soviets shocked Romanian society and greatly angered Iorga. At the two sessions of the Crown Council held on 27 June, he was one of six (out of 21) members to reject the Soviet ultimatum demanding Bessarabia's handover, instead calling vehemently for armed resistance. Later, the Nazi-mediated Second Vienna Award made Northern Transylvania a part of Hungary. This loss sparked a political and moral crisis, eventually leading to the establishment of a National Legionary State with Ion Antonescu as Conducător and the Iron Guard as a governing political force. In the wake of this reshuffling, Iorga decided to close down his Neamul Românesc, explaining: "When a defeat is registered, the flag is not surrendered, but its fabric is wrapped around the heart. The heart of our struggle was the national cultural idea." Perceived as Codreanu's murderer, he received renewed threats from the Iron Guard, including hate mail, attacks in the movement's press (Buna Vestire and Porunca Vremii) and tirades from the Guardist section in Vălenii. He further antagonized the new government by stating his attachment to the abdicated royal.

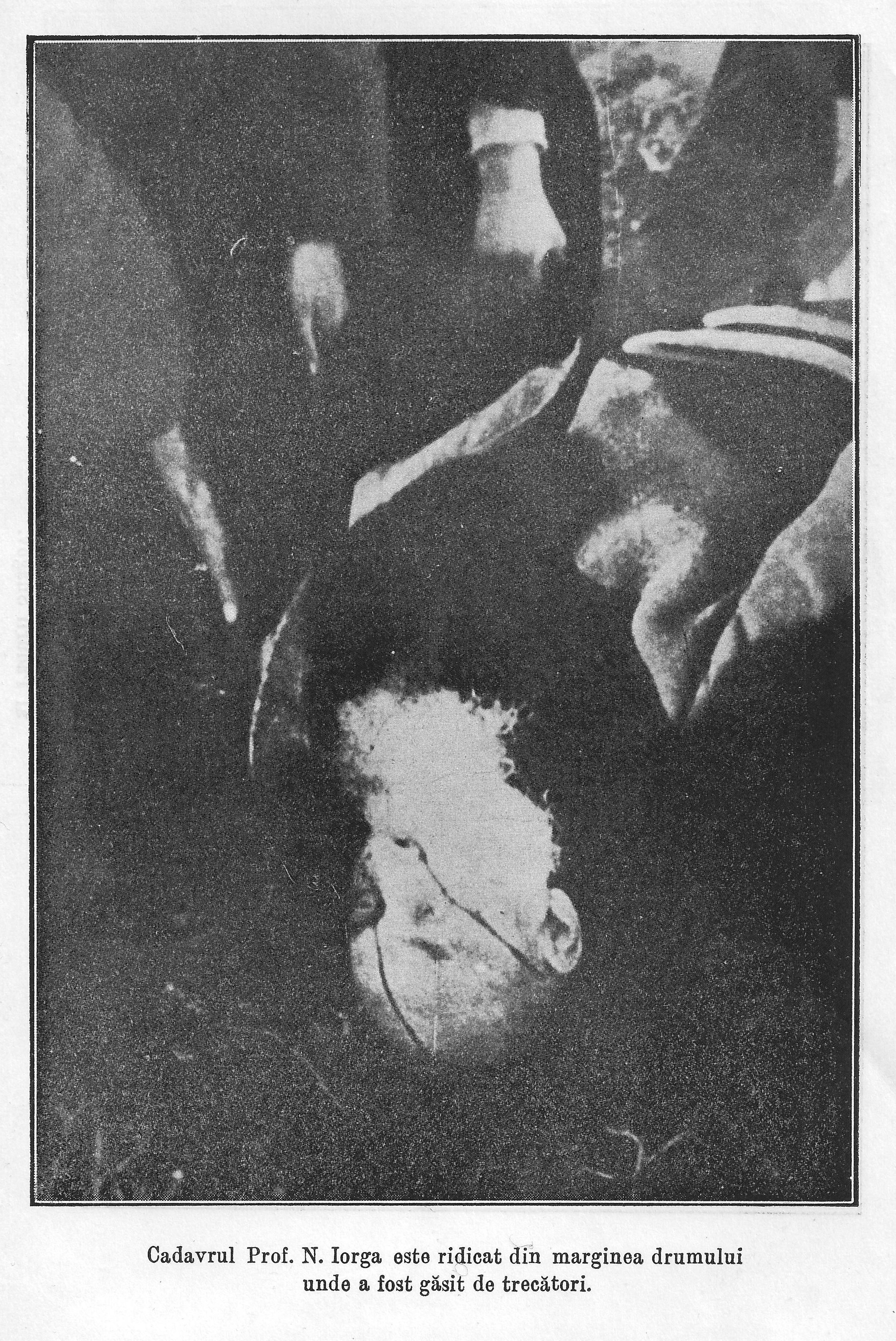
Iorga's corpse is lifted from the side of the road on the morning of 28 November 1940

Nicolae Iorga was forced out of Bucharest (where he owned a new home in Dorobanți quarter) and Vălenii de Munte by the massive earthquake of November. He then moved to Sinaia, where he gave the finishing touches to his book Istoriologia umană ("Human Historiology"). He was kidnapped by a Guardist squad, the best-known member of which was agricultural engineer Traian Boeru, on the afternoon of 27 November, and killed in the vicinity of Strejnic (some distance from the city of Ploiești). He was shot at some nine times in all, with 7.65 mm and 6.35 mm handguns. Iorga's killing is often mentioned in tandem with that of agrarian politician Virgil Madgearu, kidnapped and murdered by the Guardists on the same night, and with the Jilava massacre (during which Carol II's administrative apparatus was decimated). These acts of retribution, placed in connection with the discovery and reburial of Codreanu's remains, were carried out independently by the Guard, and enhanced tensions between it and Antonescu.

=== Memorial ===
Iorga's death caused much consternation among the general public, and was received with particular concern by the academic community. Forty-seven universities worldwide flew their flags at half-staff. A funeral speech was delivered by the exiled French historian Henri Focillon, from New York City, calling Iorga "one of those legendary personalities planted, for eternity, in the soil of a country and the history of human intelligence." At home, the Iron Guard banned all public mourning, excepting an obituary in Universul daily and a ceremony hosted by the Romanian Academy. The final oration was delivered by philosopher Constantin Rădulescu-Motru, who noted, in terms akin to those used by Focillon, that the murdered scientist had stood for "our nation's intellectual prowess", "the full cleverness and originality of the Romanian genius".

Iorga's remains were buried at Bellu, in Bucharest, on the same day as Madgearu's funeral—the attendants, who included some of the surviving interwar politicians and foreign diplomats, defied the Guard's ban with their presence. Iorga's last texts, recovered by his young disciple G. Brătescu, were kept by literary critic Șerban Cioculescu and published at a later date. Gheorghe Brătianu later took over Iorga's position at the South-East Europe Institute and the Institute of World History (known as Nicolae Iorga Institute from 1941).

== Political outlook ==
=== Conservatism and nationalism ===
Nicolae Iorga's views on society and politics stood at the meeting point of traditional conservatism, ethnic nationalism and national conservatism. This fusion is identified by political scientist Ioan Stanomir as a mutation of Junimea's ideology, running contrary to Titu Maiorescu's liberal conservatism, but resonating with the ideology of Romania's national poet, Mihai Eminescu. A maverick Junimist, Eminescu added to the conservative vision of his contemporaries an intense nationalism with reactionary, racist and xenophobic tinges, for which he received posthumous attention in Iorga's lifetime. Identified by researcher Ioana Both as a source for the "Eminescu myth", Iorga saw in him the poet of "healthy race" ideas and the "integral expression of the Romanian soul", rather than a melancholy artist. This ideological source shaped the attitudes of many Sămănătorists, eroding Junimea's influence and redefining Romanian conservatism for the space of one generation. A definition provided by political scientist John Hutchinson lists Iorga among those who embraced "cultural nationalism", which rejected modernization, as opposed to "political nationalism", which sought to modernize the nation-state.

Borrowing Maiorescu's theory about how Westernization had come to Romania as "forms without concept" (meaning that some modern customs had been forced on top of local traditions), Iorga likewise aimed it against the liberal establishment, but gave it a more radical expression. A significant point of continuity between Junimism and Iorga was the notion of two "positive" social classes, both opposed to the bourgeoisie: the lower class, represented by the peasantry, and the aristocratic class of boyars. Like Maiorescu, Iorga attacked the centralizing 1866 Constitution, to which he opposed a statehood based on "organic" growth, with self-aware local communities as a source of legitimacy. Also resonating with the Junimist club was Iorga's vision of the French Revolution—according to French author René Girault, the Romanian was an "excellent connaisseur" of this particular era. The revolutionary experience was, in Iorga's view, traumatic, while its liberal or Jacobin inheritors were apostates disturbing the traditional equilibrium. His response to the Jacobin model was an Anglophile and Tocquevillian position, favoring the British constitutional system and praising the American Revolution as the positive example of nation-building.

Like Junimism, Iorga's conservatism did not generally rely on religion. A secularist among the traditionalists, he did not attach a special meaning to Christian ethics, and, praising the creative force of man, saw asceticism as a negative phenomenon. However, he strongly identified the Romanian Orthodox Church and its hesychasm with the Romanian psyche, marginalizing the Latin Church and the Transylvanian School. In rejecting pure individualism, Iorga also reacted against the modern reverence toward Athenian democracy or the Protestant Reformation, giving more positive appraisals to other community models: Sparta, Macedonia, the Italian city-states. As argued by political scientist Mihaela Czobor-Lupp, his was an "alternative" to the rationalist perspective, and a counterweight to Max Weber's study on The Protestant Ethic. His theories identified the people as a "natural entity [with] its own organic life", and sometimes justified the right of conquest when new civilizations toppled decadent ones—the conflict, he argued, was between Heracles and Trimalchio. In his private and public life, Iorga's conservatism also came with sexist remarks: like Maiorescu, Iorga believed that women only had a talent for nurturing and assisting male protagonists in public affairs.

Despite the various similarities, Iorga and the Junimist loyalists became political enemies. Early on, Maiorescu would respond to his letters with disdain, while novelist Ioan Slavici called his irredentist projects "nonsense". Writing in 1920, Convorbiri Critice editor Mihail Dragomirescu accused those Junimists who followed Iorga's "chauvinist nationalism" of having forgotten that Maiorescu's art for art's sake principles "substituted the political criterion of patriotism for the criterion of truth." The conflict between Iorga and Dragomirescu was also personal, and, as reported by Iorga's disciple Alexandru Lapedatu, even caused the two to physically assault each other.

Iorga's brand of national conservatism was more successful than its more conventional predecessor: while the Conservative Party disappeared from the public eye after 1918, Iorga's more nationalistic interpretation was still considered relevant in the 1930s. One of the last Conservative leaders, Nicolae Filipescu, even pondered forging an alliance with the historian, in an attempt to save the group for dissolution. According to Ioan Stanomir, Iorga and fellow historian Ioan C. Filitti were together responsible for "the most memorable pages" in Romanian conservative theory for "the 1928–1938 decade". In Stanomir's assessment, this last period of Iorga's activity also implied a move toward the main sources of traditional conservatism, bringing Iorga closer to the line of thought represented by Edmund Burke, Thomas Jefferson or Mihail Kogălniceanu, and away from that of Eminescu.

The final years brought Iorga's stark condemnation of all statism, from the absolute monarchy to modern state capitalism, accompanied by a dystopian perspective on industrialization as the end of the individual. Like Eminescu, Iorga was essentially a conservative anti-capitalist and economic corporatist, who confessed his admiration for pre-modern guilds. In Stanomir's account, these ideals, alongside the dreams of a "ghostly" organic identity, anti-ideological monarchism and national regeneration, brought Iorga into Carol II's camp. Another factor was the rise of Nazi Germany, which, Iorga thought, could only be met by national unity under a powerful ruler. The realignment came with contradictory statements on Iorga's part, such as when, in 1939, he publicly described Carol's Hohenzollern-Sigmaringen house as having usurped the throne of Domnitor Alexander John I, statements which enraged monarchist writer Gala Galaction.

Iorga found himself in Kogălniceanu's conservative statement, "civilization stops when revolutions begin", being especially critical of communist revolution. He described the Soviet experiment as a "caricature" of the Jacobin age and communist leader Joseph Stalin as a dangerous usurper. Iorga found the small Romanian Communist Party an amusement and, even though he expressed alarm for its terrorist tendencies and its "foreign" nature, disliked the state's use of brutal methods against its members.

=== Antisemitism ===
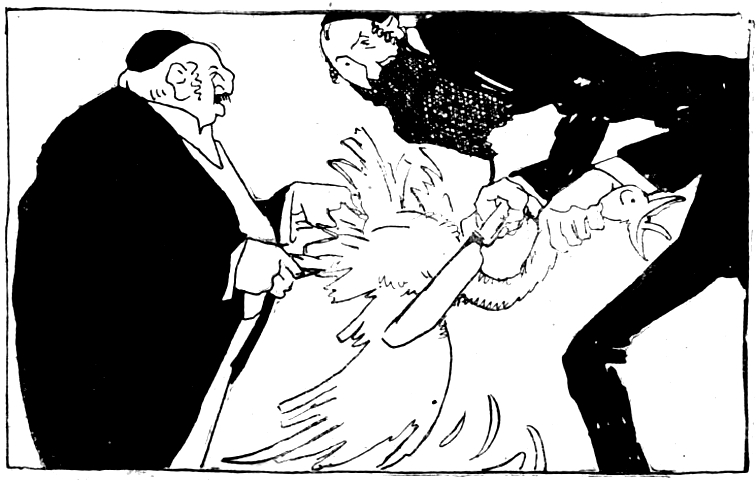
April's Fool. On 1 April, the Israelite community of Buhuși has entrusted Mr Iorga with the office of Hakham in that locality. (1910 cartoon by Ion Theodorescu-Sion)

A major and controversial component of Iorga's political vision, present throughout most of his career, was his antisemitism. Cultural historian William O. Oldson notes that Iorga's "amazing list of accomplishments" in other fields helped give antisemitism "an irresistible panache" in Romania, particularly since Iorga shared in the belief that all good nationalists were antisemites. His ideas on the "Jewish Question" were frequently supported by violent language, which left traces on his journalist activity (even though, Oldson notes, he did not resort to racial slurs). In 1901, when he blocked Jewish linguist Lazăr Șăineanu from obtaining an academic position, Iorga wrote that Jews had a "passion for high praise and multiple earnings"; three years later, in Sămănătorul, he argued that Iași was polluted by the "dirty business" of a "heathen and hostile" community. Similar accusations were stated, in his travel accounts, where he even justified pogroms against Bukovinian and Bessarabian Jews.

The PND, coming from the same ideological family as Poland's Roman Dmowski and the National Democracy movement, proclaimed that local Jews were suffocating the Romanian middle class and needed to be expelled, using slogans such as Evreii la Palestina ("The Jews to Palestine"). The program was criticized from early on by Constantin Rădulescu-Motru, Iorga's fellow nationalist and post-Junimist, who noted that the economic rationale behind it was unsound. According to Oldson, the claim that Jews were economic "vampires" was entirely unsubstantiated, even hypocritical: "[Iorga was] a Moldavian and fully aware of the complex causes of that province's poverty".

Iorga's personal conservative outlook, passed into the party doctrines, also implied a claim that the Jews were agents of rebellion against political and cultural authority. He had nevertheless opted for religious-cultural over racial antisemitism, believing that, at the core of civilization, there was a conflict between Christian values and Judaism. He also suggested that Romanian antisemitism was conjectural and defensive, segregationist rather than destructive, and repeatedly argued that xenophobia was not in the national character—ideas paraphrased by Oldson as a "humane antisemitism". Oldson also refers to a paradox in the attitude of Iorga (and Bogdan Petriceicu Hasdeu before him): "A self-consciously proclaimed esteem for a minuscule [Jewish] elite (such as writer Gheorghe Kernbach), then, went hand in hand with the utmost contempt and condescension for the bulk of Romanian Jewry."

Reviewing the impact of such ideas, literary critic William Totok referred to Neamul Românesc as "the most important platform of antisemitic agitation prior to World War I." Habitually, the magazine attacked the Jewish-owned papers Adevărul and Dimineața, while claiming to document the "Judaization" of Romania's intellectual environments. It also specifically targeted Romanians who were friendly with Jews, one such case being that of writer Ion Luca Caragiale (attacked for his contacts with Șăineanu, dramatist Ronetti Roman and other Jews). Caragiale replied with noted irony, calling Iorga "tall but crooked".

Nicolae Iorga and A. C. Cuza's modern revival of antisemitism, together with the core themes of Sămănătorul propaganda, were paradoxical sources of inspiration for the Iron Guard in its early years. However, with the interwar period came a relaxation of Iorga's own antisemitic discourse, when he described Jews as potentially loyal to "the legitimate masters of the land". He recorded being touched by his warm reception among the Romanian American Jewish community in 1930, and, after 1934, published his work with the Adevărul group. As Cuza himself began censuring this more tolerant discourse, Iorga even voiced his admiration for the Jewish mecena Aristide Blank. As noted by researcher George Voicu, the anti-"Judaization" discourse of the far right was by then turning against Iorga. Also, as Prime Minister, Nicolae Iorga did not promote antisemitic measures. Later in life, Iorga made the occasional return to antisemitic rhetoric: in 1937–1938, he alleged that Jews were pressuring Romanians into leaving the country, and described the necessity of "delousing" Romania by colonizing Romanian Jews elsewhere.

Despite his shifting attitude towards the Romanian Jewry, he opposed the Zionist movement throughout his life.

=== Geopolitics ===
Greater Romania and the Little Entente (in light green), with their nominal enemy, Regency Hungary

Iorga's changing sentiment flowed between the extremes of Francophilia and Francophobia. The Romanian scholar explained in detail his dislike for the Third Republic's social and political landscape. He recalled that, in the 1890s, he had been shocked by the irreverence and cosmopolitanism of French student society. In a 1906 speech, Iorga also noted that Francophone elites and urban diglossia were slowly destroying the country's social fiber, by creating a language gap between classes. Also, Neamul Românesc showed a preference for Action Française and the French reactionary right in their conflict with the Third Republic. Shortly after the beginning of World War I, during the Battle of the Frontiers, Iorga publicized his renewed love for France, claiming that she was the only belligerent engaged in a purely defensive war; in the name of Pan-Latinism, he later chided Spain for keeping neutral.

Iorga's coverage of European culture and continental affairs also opened bridges with other cultural areas, particularly so during the interwar. By that time, historian Lucian Boia notes, he was seeing Europe as a community of nations, and, "in his own way", was rejecting isolationism or "primitive" xenophobia. According to academic Francesco Guida, Iorga's political and scholarly activities displayed a "great openness towards the outside world", even as, in 1930s France, public opinion was turning against him. Instead, Iorga affirmed himself as a promoter of English culture, making noted efforts at promoting awareness of its defining traits among the Romanian public. At the time, although flirting with Pan-European nationalism, he stood in contrast with the Transylvanian-born Iuliu Maniu for displaying no sympathy toward Danubian Confederation projects, believing them to conceal Hungary's revanchism.

Disenchanted with German culture after the shock of World War I, Iorga also had strong views on Adolf Hitler, Nazi Germany and Nazism in general, taking in view their contempt for the Versailles system, but also their repressive politics. He summarized this in Sfaturi pe întuneric: "Beware my people for great dangers are stalking you ... Borders are attacked, gutted, destroyed, gulped up. ... There reemerges, in its cruelest form, the old theory that small states have no right to independence, that they fall within living spaces ... I cannot forget the past and I cannot reach an agreement with Hitler's dictatorship, being a man who cherishes freedom of thought". He later called Germany's Bohemia Protectorate a "Behemoth", referring to its annexation as a "prehistoric" act.

His anti-war texts of 1939 replied to claims that a new armed conflict would usher in national "vitality", and, during the September Campaign, expressed solidarity with Poland—Iorga's Polonophila was even noted by the Nazis, causing more frictions between Berlin and Bucharest. The conservative Iorga was however inclined to sympathize with other forms of totalitarianism or corporatism, and, since the 1920s, viewed Italian Fascism with some respect. Italian agents of influence hesitated between Iorga and the Iron Guard, but the Fascist International sought to include Iorga among its Romanian patrons; Iorga himself expressed regret that the Italian regime was primarily an ally of revanchist Hungary, but applauded the 1935 invasion of Ethiopia, and, to the alarm of France, repeatedly argued that an Italian alliance was more secure than the Little Entente.

Nicolae Iorga's bitterness about Romanian geopolitical disadvantages was encoded in his oft-quoted remark about the country only having two peaceful borders: one with Serbia, the other with the Black Sea. Despite these views, he endorsed the idea of minority rights in Greater Romania, attempting to find common ground with the Hungarian-Romanian community. In addition to promoting inclusive action in government, Iorga declared himself against turning Hungarians and Transylvanian Saxons into "pharisaic" Romanians by coercing them to adopt the Romanian tradition. In 1936, he even spoke in favor of Armenian Hungarian archaeologist Márton Roska, prosecuted in Romania for challenging official theses about Transylvania, arguing that Transylvania "cannot be defended with prison sentences". Iorga was also noted for fostering the academic career of Eufrosina Dvoichenko-Markov, one of the few Russian-Romanian researchers of the interwar period. He was however skeptical about the Ukrainian identity and rejected the idea of an independent Ukraine on Romania's border, debating the issues with ethnographer Zamfir Arbore.

Various of Iorga's tracts speak in favor of a common background uniting the diverse nations of the Balkans. Bulgarian historian Maria Todorova suggests that, unlike many of his predecessors, Iorga was not alarmed Romania being perceived as a Balkan country, and did not attach a negative connotation to this affiliation (even though, she notes, Iorga explicitly placed the northern limit of the Balkans on the Danube, just south of Wallachia). In the 1930s, the Romanian scholar spoke with respect about all the Balkan peoples, but claimed that Balkan statehood was "Oriental" and underdeveloped.

== Scientific work ==
=== Iorga's reputation for genius ===
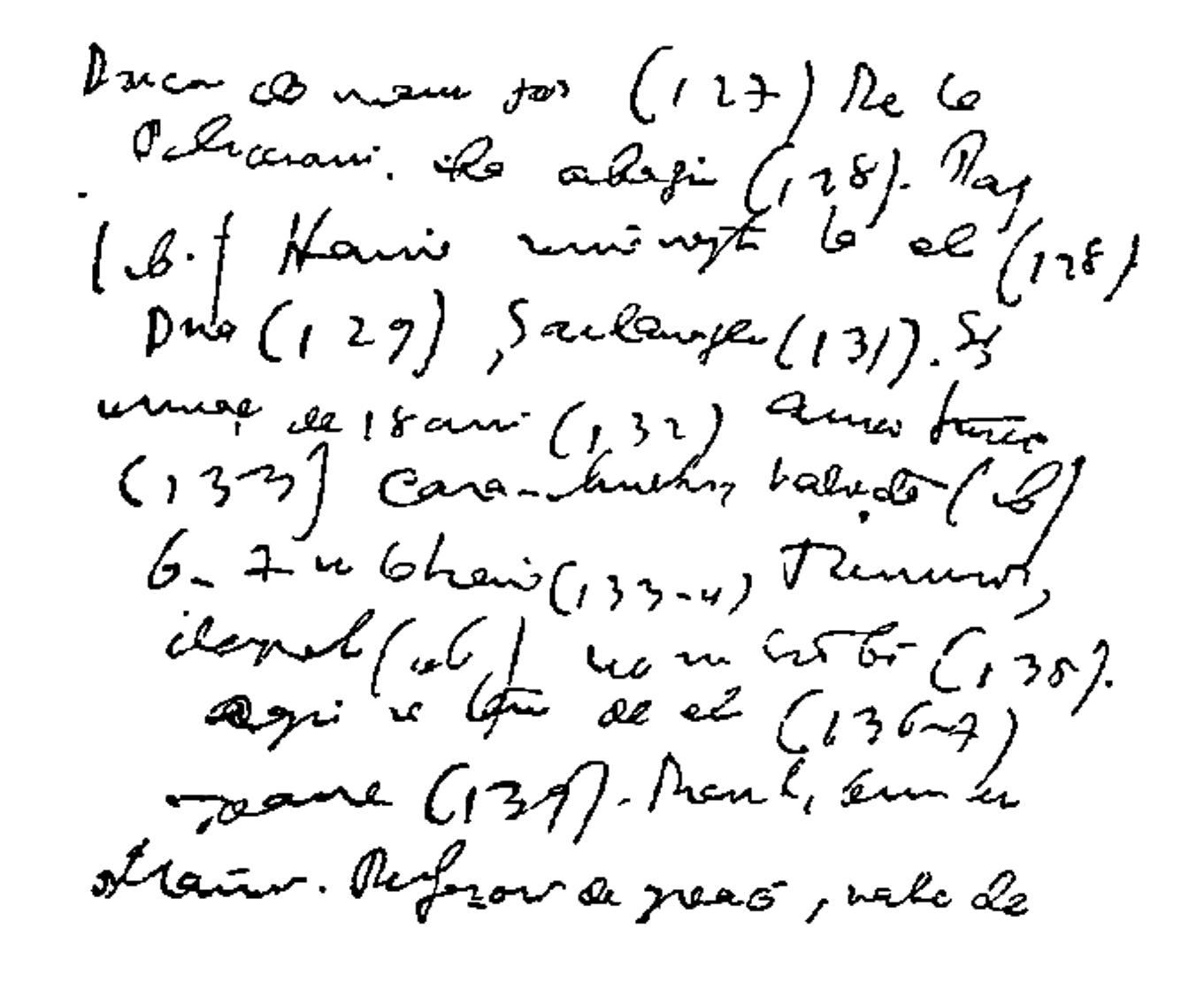
Iorga's shorthand method: a fragment from his private notes

Iorga the European scholar has drawn comparisons with figures such as Voltaire, Jules Michelet, Leopold von Ranke and Claudio Sánchez-Albornoz. Having achieved fluency in some 12 foreign languages, he was an exceptionally prolific author: according to his biographer Barbu Theodorescu, the total of his published contributions, both volumes and brochures, was 1,359. His work in documenting Romania's historical past could reach an unprecedented intensity, one such exceptional moment being a 1903 study trip to Târgu Jiu, a three-day interval during which he copied and summarized 320 individual documents, covering the period 1501–1833. His mentor and rival Xenopol was among the first voices to discuss his genius, his 1911 Academy speech in honor of Nicolae Iorga making special note of his "absolutely extraordinary memory" and his creative energy, and concluding: "one asks himself in wonder how a brain was able to conceive of so many things and a hand was able to record them". In 1940, Rădulescu-Motru likewise argued that Iorga had been "a creator ... of unparalleled fecundity", while Enciclopedia Cugetarea deemed him the greatest-ever mind in Romania. According to literary historian George Călinescu, Iorga's "huge" and "monstrously" comprehensive research, leaving no other historian "the joy of adding something", was matched by the everyday persona, a "hero of the ages".

The level of Iorga's productivity and the quality of his historical writing were also highlighted by more modern researchers. Literary historian Ovid Crohmălniceanu opined that Iorga's scientific work was one of the "illustrious accomplishments" of the interwar years, on par with Constantin Brâncuși's sculptures and George Enescu's music. Romanian historian of culture Alexandru Zub finds that Iorga's is "surely the richest opus coming from the 20th century", while Maria Todorova calls Iorga "Romania's greatest historian", adding "at least in terms of the size of his opus and his influence both at home and abroad". According to philosopher Liviu Bordaș, Iorga's main topic of interest, the relation between Romania and the Eastern world, was exhaustively covered: "nothing escaped this sacred monster's attention: Iorga had read everything."

=== Method and biases ===
The definition of history followed by Iorga was specified in his 1894 Despre concepția actuală a istoriei și geneza ei: "History is the systematic exposition, free from all unrelated purpose, of facts irrespective of their nature, methodically acquired, through which human activity manifested itself, irrespective of place and time." With Ioan Bogdan and Dimitrie Onciul, young Iorga was considered an exponent of the "new" or "critical" school, with which Junimism tackled Romantic nationalism in the name of objectivity. However, even at that stage, Iorga's ideas accommodated a belief that history needed to be written with a "poetic talent" that would make one "relive" the past.

By 1902, he had changed his approach in historiography to include and illustrate his belief in emotional attachment as a positive value of cultural nationalism. He would speak of historians as "elders of [their] nation", and dismissed academic specialization as a "blindfold". Reflecting back on the transition, Iorga himself stated: "The love for the past, for great figures of energy and sincerity, ... the exact contrary of tendencies I had found existed among my contemporaries, had gripped me and, added to my political preoccupations, such awakenings served me, when it came to criticizing things present, more than any argument that is abstract, logical in nature." The point of his research, Iorga explained in 1922, was to show "the nation itself as a living being". According to literary historian Victor Iova: "[Iorga's] overall activity ... did not just seek the communication of knowledge, but also expressly sought to define the social finality of his time, its ethical sense and his own patriotic ideal." The 1911 speech Două concepții istorice nevertheless provided a more nuanced outline, cautioning against a potential cult of heroes and suggesting that national histories were inextricably linked to each other: "The life of a people is at all times mingled with the lives of others, existing in relation with these and at all times feeding into the others' lives."

According to George Călinescu, Nicolae Iorga was overdependent on his memory, which could result in "utterly fictitious" critical apparatuses for his scientific works. Călinescu suggests that Iorga was an "anachronistic" type in his context: "approved only by failures", aged before his time, modeling himself on ancient chroniclers and out of place in modern historiography. In the 1930s, Iorga's status in regulating the official historical narrative was challenged by Constantin C. Giurescu, P. P. Panaitescu and Gheorghe Brătianu, who wanted to return academic discourse back to the basic Junimist caveats, and were seen by Iorga as "denialists". For all the controversy, Lucian Boia suggests, neither of the Revista Istorică Română publishers was completely beyond Iorga's subjectivity, pathos or political bias, even though Panaitescu was for long "closer" to the Junimist model. A particular challenge to Iorga's historical narrative also came from rival Hungarian historiography: in 1929, Benedek Jancsó called Iorga's science a branch of "Romanian imperialist nationalism", his argument rejected as "false logic" by the Romanian. Iorga had a friendly attitude toward other Hungarian scholars, including Árpád Bitay and Imre Kádár, who were his guests at Vălenii.

Several other historians have expressed criticism of Iorga's bias and agenda. R. W. Seton-Watson regarded him as "prolific" and "bahnbrechend", but mentioned his "slovenly style". In 1945, Hugh Seton-Watson spoke of the "great Roumanian Professor" having contributed "erudite chronology, written in a highly romantic and bombastic spirit." In his own Mehmed the Conqueror and His Time, Iorga's German colleague Franz Babinger also noted that Iorga could get "carried away by national pride". Medievalist Kenneth Setton also described Iorga as "the great Rumanian historian ... who was sometimes intoxicated by the grandeur of his own historical concepts, but whose work is always illuminating." While Japanese sociologist Kosaku Yoshino sees Iorga as a main contributor to didactic and dramatized cultural nationalism in Europe, University of Trento academic Paul Blokker suggests that, although "politicized, essentialist and sometimes anachronistic", Iorga's writings can be critically recovered. Ioana Both notes: "A creator with titan-like forces, Iorga is more a visionary of history than a historian". Bordaș criticizes Iorga's habit of recording "everything" into his studies, and without arranging the facts described into an "epistemological relationship".

Despite Iorga's ambition of fusing research and pedagogy, his students, both rivals and friends, often noted that he was inferior to other colleagues when it came to teaching, in particular in directing advanced classes—reportedly, his popularity dropped with time, the aging Iorga having displayed aggression toward inquisitive students. In 1923, even an old friend like Sextil Pușcariu could accuse Iorga of behaving like a "dictator". In compensation, the historian fulfilled this function with his activity in the media and in the field of popular history, at which he was, according to historian Lucian Nastasă, masterful but vulgarizing.

=== Iorga and Romanian ethnogenesis ===
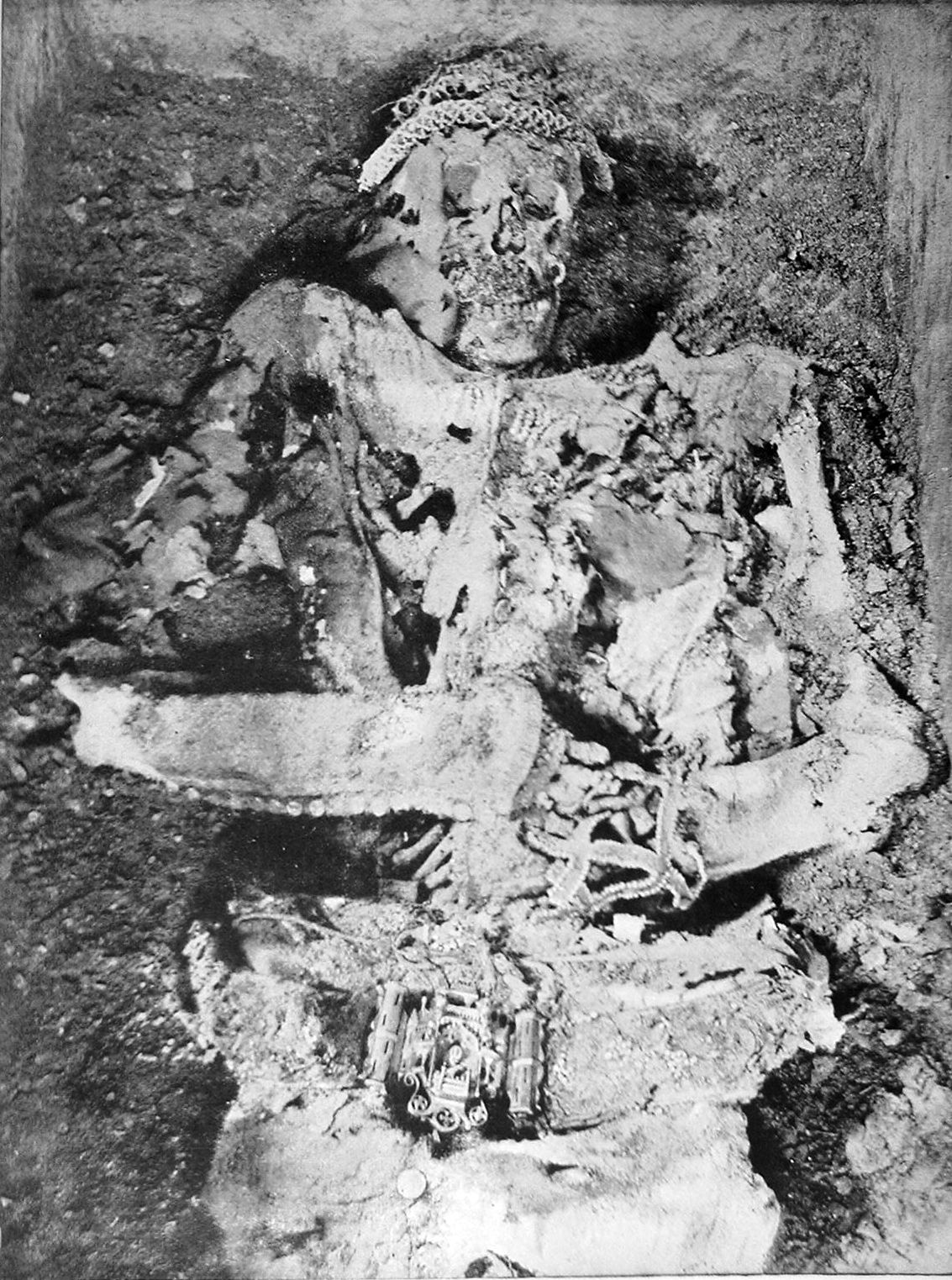
Radu I of Wallachia's remains, as uncovered in 1920 (thought by Iorga to belong to Basarab I)

Iorga's ideas on the origin of the Romanians, and his explanation for the more mysterious parts of that lengthy ethnogenesis process, were shaped by both his scientific and ideological preoccupations. Some of Iorga's studies focused specifically on the original events in the process: ancient Dacia's conquest by the Roman Empire (Trajan's Dacian Wars), and the subsequent foundation of Roman Dacia. His account is decidedly in support of Romania's Roman (Latin) roots, and even suggests that Romanization preceded the actual conquest. However, he viewed the autochthonous element in this acculturation, the Dacians (collocated by him with the Getae), as historically significant, and he even considered them the source for Romania's later links with the Balkan "Thracian" space. Through the Thracians and the Illyrians, Iorga believed to have found a common root for all Balkan peoples, and an ethnic layer which he believed was still observable after later conquests. He was nevertheless explicit in distancing himself from the speculative texts of Dacianist Nicolae Densușianu, where Dacia was described as the source of all European civilization.

Iorga had a complex personal perspective on the little-documented Dark Age history, between the Roman departure (271 AD) and the 14th century emergence of two Danubian Principalities: Moldavia and Wallachia. Despite the separate histories and conflicting allegiances these regions had during the High Middle Ages, he tended to group the two Principalities and medieval Transylvania together, into a vague non-stately entity he named "the Romanian Land". Iorga cautioned about the emergence of states from a stateless society such as the proto-Romanian one: "The state is a late, very elevated, very delicate form that, under certain conditions, may be reached by a people. ... There was therefore no state, but a Romanian mass living in the midst of forests, in those villages harbored by protective forests, where it is just as true that a certain way of life could emerge, sometimes on a rather elevated level."

Echoing his political conservatism, Iorga's theory proposed that the Romanized Dacians, or all their Vlach-Romanian successors, had created peasant republics to defend themselves against the invading nomads. It spoke of the rapid ruralization of Latin urban dwellers—suggested to him by etymologies such as the derivation of pământ ("soil") from pavimentum, and the creation of "genealogical villages" around common ancestors (moși) or the ancient communal sharing of village lands, in the manner imagined by writer Nicolae Bălcescu. Iorga also supposed that, during the 12th century, there was an additional symbiosis between settled Vlachs and their conquerors, the nomadic Cumans.

Iorga's peasant polities, sometimes described by him as Romanii populare ("people's Romanias", "people's Roman-like polities"), were seen by him as the sources of a supposed uncodified constitution in both Moldavia and Wallachia. That constitutional system, he argued, created solidarity: the countries' hospodar rulers were themselves peasants, elected to high military office by their peers, and protecting the entire community. Unlike Ioan Bogdan and others, Iorga strongly rejected any notion that the South Slavs had been an additional contributor to ethnogenesis, and argued that Slavic idioms were a sustained but nonessential influence in historical Romanian. Until 1919, he was cautious about counting the Romanians and Aromanians as one large ethnic group, but later came to share the inclusivist views of his Romanian colleagues. Iorga also stood out among his generation for flatly rejecting any notion that the 12th-century Second Bulgarian Empire was a "Vlach-Bulgarian" or "Romanian-Bulgarian" project, noting that the Vlach achievements there benefited "another nation" (Iorga's italics).

The stately foundation of Moldavia and of Wallachia, Iorga thought, were linked to the emergence of major trade routes in the 14th century, and not to the political initiative of military elites. Likewise, Iorga looked into the genesis of boyardom, describing the selective progression of free peasants into a local aristocracy. He described the later violent clash between hospodars and boyars as one between national interest and disruptive centrifugal tendencies, suggesting that prosperous boyardom had undermined the balance of the peasant state. His theory about the peasant nature of Romanian statehood was hotly debated in his lifetime, particularly after a 1920 discovery showed that Radu I of Wallachia had been buried in the full regalia of medieval lords. Another one of his influential (but disputed) claims attributed the appearance of pre-modern slavery, mainly affecting the Romani (Gypsy) minority, exclusively on alien customs borrowed from the Mongol Empire. Iorga's verdicts as a medievalist also produced a long-standing controversy about the real location of the 1330 Battle of Posada—so-named by him after an obscure reference in the Chronicon Pictum—whereby the Wallachian Princes secured their throne.

A major point of contention between Panaitescu and Iorga referred to Michael the Brave's historical achievements: sacrilegious in the eyes of Iorga, Panaitescu placed in doubt Michael's claim to princely descent, and described him as mainly the political agent of boyar interests. Contradicting the Romantic nationalist tradition, Iorga also agreed with younger historians that, for most of their history, Romanians in Moldavia, Wallachia and Transylvania were more justifiably attached to their polities than to national awakening ideals. Panaitescu was however more categorical than Iorga in affirming that Michael the Brave's expeditions were motivated by political opportunism rather than by a pan-Romanian national awareness.

=== Byzantine and Ottoman studies ===
Two of Iorga's major fields of expertise were Byzantine studies and Turkology. A significant portion of his contributions in the field detailed the impact of Byzantine influences on the Danubian Principalities and the Balkans at large. He described the "Byzantine man" as embodying the blend of several cultural universes: Greco-Roman, Levantine and Eastern Christian. In this context, Iorga was also exploring Romania's own identity issues as a confluence of Byzantine Eastern Orthodoxy and a Western Roman linguistic imprint.

Iorga's writings insisted on the importance of Byzantine Greek and Levantine influences in the two countries after the fall of Constantinople: his notion of "Byzantium after Byzantium" postulated that the cultural forms produced by the Byzantine Empire had been preserved by the Principalities under Ottoman suzerainty (roughly, between the 16th and 18th centuries). Additionally, the Romanian scholar described the Ottoman Empire itself as the inheritor of Byzantine government, legal culture and civilization, up to the Age of Revolution. However, the Geschichte des Osmanischen Reiches postulated that the Ottoman decline was irreversible, citing uncompromising Islam as one of the causes, and playing down the cohesive action of Ottomanism.

The post-Byzantine thesis was taken by various commentators as further proof that the Romanian historian, unlike many of his contemporaries, accepted a level of multiculturalism or acculturation in defining modern Romanian identity. Semiotician Monica Spiridon writes: "Iorga highly valued the idea of cultural confluence and hybridity." Similarly, Maria Todorova notes that, although it minimized the Ottoman contribution and displayed "emotional or evaluative overtones", such a perspective ran against the divisive interpretations of the Balkans, offering a working paradigm for a global history of the region: "Although Iorga's theory may be today [ca. 2009] no more than an exotic episode in the development of Balkan historiography, his formulation Byzance après Byzance is alive not only because it was a fortunate phrase but because it reflects more than its creator would intimate. It is a good descriptive term, particularly for representing the commonalities of the Orthodox peoples in the Ottoman Empire ... but also in emphasizing the continuity of two imperial traditions". With his research, Iorga also rehabilitated the Phanariotes, Greek or Hellenized aristocrats who controlled Wallachia and Moldavia in Ottoman times, and whom Romanian historiography before him presented as wreckers of the country.

== Cultural critic ==
=== Beginnings ===
Iorga's tolerance for the national bias] in historiography and his own political profile were complemented in the field of literature and the arts by his strong belief in didacticism. Art's mission was, in his view, to educate and empower the Romanian peasant. The rejection of art for art's sake, whose indifference in front of nationality issues enraged the historian, was notably illustrated by his 1902 letter to the like-minded Luceafărul editors, which stated: "You gentlemen should not allow aesthetic preoccupations to play the decisive part, and you are not granted such circumstances as to dedicate yourselves to pure art. ... Do not imitate ..., do not allow yourselves to be tempted by things you have read elsewhere. Write about things from your country and about the Romanian soul therein." His ambition was to contribute an alternative to Junimist literary history, and, according to comparatist John Neubauer, for the first time integrate "the various Romanian texts and writers into a grand narrative of an organic and spontaneous growth of native creativity, based on local tradition and folklore." Iorga described painter Nicolae Grigorescu as the purveyor of national pride, and was enthusiastic about Stoica D., the war artist. He recommended artists to study handicrafts, even though, an adversary of the pastiche, he strongly objected to Brâncovenesc revival style taken up by his generation. His own monographs on Romanian art and folklore, admired in their time by art historian Gheorghe Oprescu, were later rated by ethologist Romulus Vulcănescu a sample of microhistory, rather than a groundbreaking new research.

Initially, with Opinions sincères, Iorga offered a historian's manifesto against the whole cultural establishment, likened by historian Ovidiu Pecican with Allan Bloom's 1980s critique of American culture. Before 1914, Iorga focused his critical attention on Romanian Symbolists, whom he denounced for their erotic style (called "lupanarium literature" by Iorga) and aestheticism—in one instance, he even scolded Sămănătorul contributor Dimitrie Anghel for his floral-themed Symbolist poems. His own theses were ridiculed early in the 20th century by Symbolists such as Emil Isac, Ovid Densusianu or Ion Minulescu, and toned down by Sămănătorul poet Ștefan Octavian Iosif.

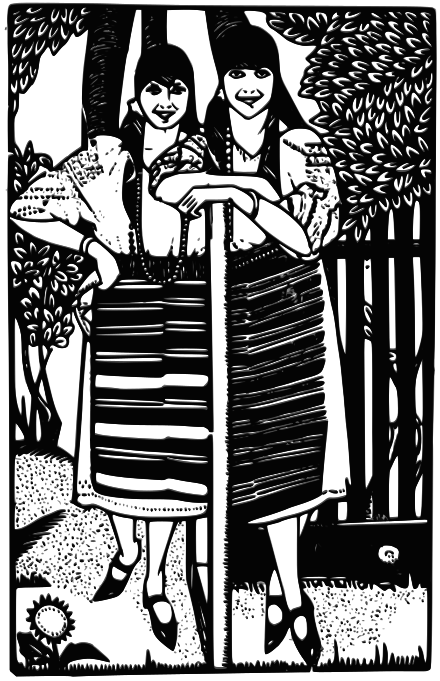
Girls in Romanian dress. Nadia Bulighin's illustration to Iorga's conferences "on the Romanian nation" (1927)

After his own Marxist beginnings, Iorga was also a critic of Constantin Dobrogeanu-Gherea's socialist and Poporanist school, and treated its literature with noted disdain. In reply, Russian Marxist journalist Leon Trotsky accused him of wishing to bury all left-wing contributions to culture, and local socialist Henric Sanielevici wrote that Iorga's literary doctrine did not live up to its moral goals. Iorga wrote with noted warmth about Contemporanul and its cultural agenda, but concluded that Poporanists represented merely "the left-wing current of the National Liberal Party".

=== Campaigns against modernism ===
Iorga's direct influence as a critic had largely faded by the 1920s, owing in part to his decision of concentrating his energy elsewhere. Nevertheless, he was still often involved at the forefront of cultural campaigns against the various manifestations of modernism, initiating polemics with all the circles representing Romania's new literary and artistic trends: the moderate Sburătorul review of literary theorist Eugen Lovinescu; the eclectic Contimporanul magazine; the Expressionist cell affiliated with the traditionalist magazine Gândirea; and ultimately the various local branches of Dada or Surrealism. In some of his essays, Iorga identified Expressionism with the danger of Germanization, a phenomenon he described as "intolerable" (although, unwittingly, he was also among the first Romanians to tackle Expressionism). In an analogy present in a 1922 article for Gazeta Transilvaniei, Iorga suggested that the same "German" threat was agitating the avant-garde voices of Latin Europe, Futurists and Dadaist "energumens" alike. During the 1930s, as the cultural and political climate changed, Iorga's main accusation against Tudor Arghezi, Lucian Blaga, Mircea Eliade, Liviu Rebreanu, George Mihail Zamfirescu and other Romanian modernists was their supposed practice of literary "pornography".

The ensuing polemics were often bitter, and Iorga's vehemence was met with ridicule by his modernist adversaries. Sburătorul literary chronicler Felix Aderca saw in Iorga the driver of "the boorish carts of Sămănătorism", and Blaga called him "the collective name for a multitude of monsters". Iorga's stance on "pornography" only attracted provocation from the younger avant-garde writers. In the early 1930s, the avant-garde youth put out the licentious art magazine Alge sent him a copy for review; prosecuted on Iorga's orders, they all later became noted as left-wing authors and artists: Aurel Baranga, Gherasim Luca, Paul Păun, Jules Perahim.

A lengthy polemic consumed Iorga's relationship with Lovinescu, having at its core the irreconcilable differences between their visions of cultural history. Initially an Iorga aficionado and an admirer of his attack on foreign influences, the Sburătorul leader left sarcastic comments on Iorga's rejection of Symbolism, and, according to Crohmălniceanu, "entire pages of ironies targeting Iorga's advice to writers that they should focus of the sufferings of their 'brother' in the village". Lovinescu also ridiculed Iorga's traditionalist mentoring, calling him a "pontiff of indecency and insult", an enemy of "democratic freedom", and the patron of forgettable "literature about hajduks".

Other authors back Lovinescu's verdict about the historian's lack of critical intuition and prowess. According to Călinescu, Iorga was visibly embarrassed by even 19th century Romanticism, out of his territory with virtually everything after "Villani and Commynes", and endorsing the "obscure manqués" in modern Romanian letters. Alexandru George only supports in part this verdict, noting that Iorga's literary histories degenerated from "masterpiece" to "gravest mistake". An entire category of minor, largely forgotten, writers was endorsed by Iorga, among them Vasile Pop, Ecaterina Pitiș, Constantin T. Stoika and Sandu Teleajen.

Iorga's views were in part responsible for a split taking place at Gândirea, occurring when his traditionalist disciple, Nichifor Crainic, became the group's new leader and marginalized the Expressionists. Crainic, who was also a poet with Sămănătorist tastes, was held in esteem by Iorga, whose publications described him and his disciples as the better half of Gândirea. Iorga was also the subject of a Gândirea special issue, being recognized as a forerunner (a title he shared with Octavian Goga and Vasile Pârvan). There was however a major incompatibility between the two traditionalist tendencies: to Iorga's secularism, Crainic opposed a quasi-theocratic vision, based on the Romanian Orthodox Church as a guarantee of Romanian identity. Crainic saw his own theory as an afterthought of Sămănătorism, arguing that his Gândirism had erected an "azure tarpaulin", symbolizing the Church, over Iorga's nationalism.

In particular, his ideas on the Byzantine connections and organic development of Romanian civilization were welcomed by both the Gândirists and some representatives of more conventional modernism. One such figure, affiliated with Contimporanul, was essayist Benjamin Fondane. His views on the bridging of tradition with modernism quoted profusely from Iorga's arguments against cultural imitation, but parted with Iorga's various other beliefs. According to Călinescu, the "philosopher-myths" (Iorga and Pârvan) also shaped the anti-Junimist outlook of the 1930s Trăirists, who returned to ethnic nationalism and looked favorably on the Dacian layer of Romanian identity. Iorga's formative influence on Trăirists such as Eliade and Emil Cioran was also highlighted by some other researchers. In 1930s Bessarabia, Iorga's ideology helped influence poet Nicolai Costenco, who created Viața Basarabiei as a local answer to Cuget Clar.

== Literary work ==
=== Narrative style, drama, verse and fiction ===
According to some of his contemporaries, Nicolae Iorga was an outstandingly talented public speaker. One voice in support of this view is that of Ion Petrovici, a Junimist academic, who recounted that hearing Iorga lecture had made him overcome a prejudice which rated Maiorescu above all Romanian orators. In 1931, critic Tudor Vianu found that Iorga's "great oratorical skill" and "volcanic nature" complimented a passion for the major historical phenomena. A decade later, George Călinescu described in detail the historian's public speaking routine: the "zmeu"-like introductory outbursts, the episodes of "idle grace", the apparent worries, the occasional anger and the intimate, calm, addresses to his bewildered audience.

The oratorical technique flowed into Iorga's contribution to belles-lettres. The antiquated polished style, Călinescu notes, even surfaced in his works of research, which revived the picturesque tone of medieval chronicles. Tudor Vianu believed it "amazing" that, even in 1894, Iorga had made "so rich a synthesis of the scholarly, literary and oratorical formulas". Critic Ion Simuț suggests that Iorga is at his best in travel writing, combining historical fresco and picturesque detail. The travel writer in young Iorga blended with the essayist and, occasionally, the philosopher, although, as Vianu suggests, the Cugetări aphorisms were literary exercises rather than "philosophical system." In fact, Iorga's various reflections attack the core tenets of philosophy, and describe the philosopher prototype as detached from reality, intolerant of others, and speculative.

Iorga was a highly productive dramatist, inspired by the works of Carlo Goldoni, William Shakespeare, Pierre Corneille and the Romanian Barbu Ștefănescu Delavrancea. According to critic Ion Negoițescu, he was at home in the genre, which complimented his vision of "history as theater". Other authors are more reserved about Iorga's value for this field: noting that Negoițescu's verdict is an isolated opinion, Simuț considers the plays' rhetorical monologues "hardly bearable". Literary historian Nicolae Manolescu found some of the texts in question illegible, but argued: "It is inconceivable that Iorga's theater is entirely obsolete". Of the twenty-some plays, including many verse works, most are in the historical drama genre. Manolescu, who argues that "the best" of them have a medieval setting, writes that Constantin Brâncoveanu, Un domn pribeag and Cantemir bătrânul are "without any interest". Iorga's other work for the stage also includes the "five-act fairy tale" Frumoasa fără trup ("Bodyless Beauty"), which repeats a motif found in Romanian folklore, and a play about Jesus Christ (where Jesus is not shown, but heard).

Iorga's poems include odes to Poland, written shortly after the 1939 German invasion, described by author Nicolae Mareș as "unparalleled in any other literature". Overall, however, Iorga as poet has enlisted negative characterizations, rated by Simuț as "uninteresting and obsolete". Among Iorga's other contributions are translations from foreign writers: Johann Wolfgang von Goethe, Kostis Palamas, Goldoni etc. A special target for his interest was English literature, which he believed had a "fundamental bond" with Romanian lore, as traditions equally "steeped in mystery." In addition to translating from Marie of Edinburgh, Iorga authored versions of poems by William Butler Yeats ("Aedh Wishes for the Cloths of Heaven", "When You Are Old").

=== Memoirs ===
In old age, Iorga had also established his reputation as a memoirist: Orizonturile mele was described by Victor Iova as "a masterpiece of Romanian literature". George Călinescu referred to this series as Iorga's "interesting" and "eminently subjective" literature; "dignified" and dominated by "explosions of sentiment", it echoes, according to Călinescu, the Renaissance model of Ion Neculce. Many of the volumes were quickly written as Iorga's attempt to rehabilitate himself after a failed premiership; Orizonturile comprises messages on the power and justness of his cause: "And so I stand at age sixty-two, confident and strong, proud, upright in front of my conscience and the judgment of time." The works offer retrospective arguments against Iorga's adversaries and sketch portraits of people who crossed Iorga's path—attributes which, Iova suggests, fully exploit Iorga's talents as a "polemicist" and "portraitist"; according to Alexandru Zub, they also fall into place within the Romanian ego-history vogue, between Xenopol's and Pârvan's.

Both the diaries and the memoirs are noted for their caustic and succinct portraits of Iorga's main rivals: Maiorescu as inflexible and unemotional, Dimitrie Sturdza as avaricious, Nae Ionescu as "an awful temper", Hungarian politician István Tisza as a "Turanian" tyrant; Iorga contributed particularly emotional, and critically acclaimed, tributes for his political friends, from Vasile Bogrea to Yugoslavia's Nikola Pašić. Supt trei regi abounds in positive and negative portrayals, but, Călinescu notes, it fails to show Iorga as politically astute: "he gives the impression that he knows no more [of the events] than the man of the street."

At times, Iorga sheds a nostalgic light on his one-time opponents (similar, in Călinescu's view, to "inscriptions on their graves"). Notably in this context, Iorga reserved praise for some who had supported the Central Powers (Carol I, Virgil Arion, George Coșbuc, Dimitrie Onciul), but also stated that actual collaboration with the enemy was unforgivable. His obituary piece of socialist activist I. C. Frimu, part of Oameni cari au fost, was so sympathetic that the authorities had to censor it.

== Legacy ==
=== Scholarly impact, portrayals and landmarks ===
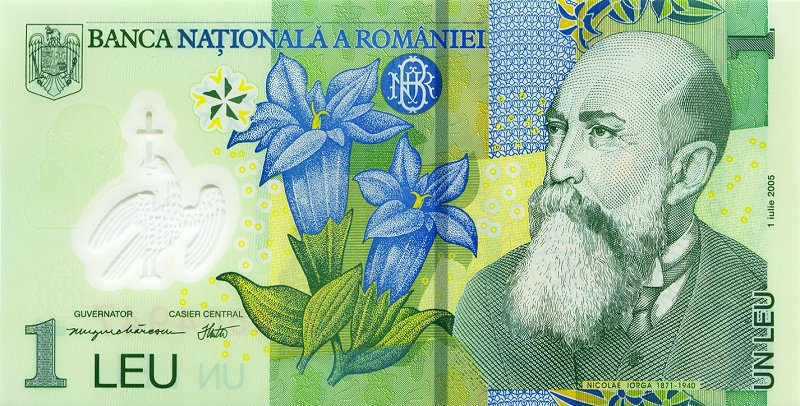
Nicolae Iorga's portrait on a Romanian bill, 2005

The fields of scientific inquiry opened by Iorga, in particular his study into the origin of the Romanians, were taken up after his death by other researchers: Gheorghe Brătianu, Constantin C. Giurescu, P. P. Panaitescu, Șerban Papacostea, Henri H. Stahl. As cultural historian, Iorga found a follower in N. Cartojan, while his thoughts on the characteristics of Romanianness inspired the social psychology of Dimitrie Drăghicescu. In the postmodern age, Iorga's pronouncements on the subject arguably contributed to the birth of Romanian imagological, post-colonial and cross-cultural studies. The idea of Romanii populare has endured as a popular working hypothesis in Romanian archaeology.

Aside from being himself a writer, Iorga's public image was also preserved in the literary work of both his colleagues and adversaries. One early example is a biting epigram by Ion Luca Caragiale, where Iorga is described as the dazed savant. In addition to the many autobiographies which discuss him, he is a hero in various works of fiction. As geographer Cristophor Arghir, he is the subject of a thinly disguised portrayal in the Bildungsroman În preajma revoluței ("Around the Time of the Revolution"), written by his rival Constantin Stere in the 1930s. Celebrated Romanian satirist and Viața Românească affiliate Păstorel Teodoreanu was engaged in a lengthy polemic with Iorga, enshrining Iorga in Romanian humor as a person with little literary skill and an oversized ego, and making him the subject of an entire collection of poems and articles, Strofe cu pelin de mai pentru Iorga Neculai ("Stanzas in May Wormwood for Iorga Neculai"). One of Teodoreanu's own epigrams in Contimporanul ridiculed Moartea lui Dante, showing the resurrected Dante Alighieri pleading with Iorga to be left in peace. Iorga was also identified as the subject of fictional portrayals in a modernist novel by N. D. Cocea and (against the author's disclaimer) in George Ciprian's play The Drake's Head.

Iorga became the subject of numerous visual portrayals. Some of the earliest were satires, such as an 1899 portrait of him as a Don Quixote (the work of Nicolae Petrescu Găină) and images of him as a ridiculously oversized character, in Ary Murnu's drawings for Furnica review. Later, Iorga's appearance inspired the works of some other visual artists, including his own daughter Magdalina (Magda) Iorga, painter Constantin Piliuță and sculptor Ion Irimescu, who was personally acquainted with the scholar. Irimescu's busts of Iorga are located in places of cultural importance: the ISSEE building in Bucharest and a public square in Chișinău, Moldova (ex-Soviet Bessarabia). The city has another Iorga bust, the work of Mihail Ecobici, in the Aleea Clasicilor complex. Since 1994, Iorga's face is featured on a highly circulated Romanian leu bill: the 10,000 lei banknote, which became the 1 leu bill following a 2005 monetary reform.

Several Romanian cities have "Nicolae Iorga" streets or boulevards: Bucharest (also home of the Iorga High School and the Iorga Park), Botoșani, Brașov, Cluj-Napoca, Constanța, Craiova, Iași, Oradea, Ploiești, Sibiu, Timișoara, etc. In Moldova, his name was also assigned to similar locations in Chișinău and Bălți. The Botoșani family home, restored and partly rebuilt in 1965, is currently preserved as a Memorial House. The house in Vălenii is a memorial museum.

=== Political symbol ===
Iorga's murder, like other acts of violence ordered by the Iron Guard, alarmed Ion Antonescu, who found that it contradicted his resolutions on public order—the first clash in a dispute which, early in 1941, erupted as the Legionary Rebellion and saw the Guard's ouster from power. Reportedly, Iorga's murder instantly repelled some known supporters of the Guard, such as Radu Gyr and Mircea Eliade. Responding to condemnation of his actions from his place of exile in Francoist Spain, the Guard leader Horia Sima claimed to have played no part in the killing. Sima stated that he did not regret the act, noting that Iorga the scholar had had a long enough career, and arguing, counterfactually, that the revenge was saluted by most Romanians.

Romania's communist regime, set up in the late 1940s, originally revised Iorga's role in the historical narrative: a record 214 works of his were banned by communist censors, and remained banned until 1965. From 1948, the Nicolae Iorga Institute of History was merged into a communist institution headed by Petre Constantinescu-Iași, while Papacostea was assigned as head of the reorganized ISSEE. Beginning in the 1960s, the national communist authorities capitalized on Nicolae Iorga's image, suggesting that he was a forerunner of Nicolae Ceaușescu's official ideology. Iorga was promoted to the national communist pantheon as an "anti-fascist" and "progressive" intellectual, and references to his lifelong anti-communism were omitted. The ban on his works was selectively lifted, and some of his main books were again in print between 1968 and 1989, along with volumes of his correspondence. In 1988, Iorga was the subject of Drumeț în calea lupilor, a Romanian film directed by Constantin Vaeni. It depicted an imaginary encounter and clash between the historian (Valentin Teodosiu) and a character based on Horia Sima (Dragoș Pâslaru). However, the Bonaparte Highway villa, bequeathed by Iorga to the state, was demolished during the Ceaușima campaign of 1986.

Iorga's theories on the Dacians and the Thracians were among the many elements synthesized into the nationalist current known as protochronism, which claimed that the sources of Romanian identity were to be found in pre-Roman history, and was offered support by Ceaușescu's regime. His work was selectively reinterpreted by protochronists such as Dan Zamfirescu, Mihai Ungheanu and Corneliu Vadim Tudor. Contrasting perspectives on Iorga's legacy were held by the various voices within the Romanian diaspora. On the 40th anniversary of his death, the Munich-based Romanian section of the anti-communist Radio Free Europe (RFE) broadcast an homage piece with renewed condemnation of Iorga's killers. RFE received death threats from obscure Iron Guard diaspora members, probably agents of the Securitate secret police.

Iorga has enjoyed posthumous popularity in the decades since the Romanian Revolution of 1989: present at the top of "most important Romanians" polls in the 1990s, he was voted in at No. 17 in the 100 greatest Romanians televised poll. As early as 1989, the Iorga Institute was reestablished under Papacostea's direction. Since 1990, the Vălenii summer school has functioned regularly, having Iorga exegete Valeriu Râpeanu as a regular guest. In later years, the critical interpretation of Iorga's work, first proposed by Lucian Boia around 1995, was continued by a new school of historians, who distinguished between the nationalist-didactic and informative contents.

=== Descendants ===
Nicolae Iorga had over ten children from his marriages, but many of them died in infancy. In addition to Florica Chirescu, his children from Maria Tasu were Petru, Elena, Maria; with Catinca, he fathered Mircea, Ștefan, Magdalina, Liliana, Adriana, Valentin, and Alina. Magdalina, who enjoyed success as a painter, later started a family in Italy. The only one of his children to train in history, known for her work in reediting her father's books and her contribution as a sculptor, Liliana Iorga married fellow historian Dionisie Pippidi in 1943. Alina became the wife of an Argentine jurist, Francisco P. Laplaza.

Mircea Iorga was married into the aristocratic Știrbey family, and then to Mihaela Bohățiel, a Transylvanian noblewoman who was reputedly a descendant of the Lemeni clan and of the medieval magnate Johannes Benkner. He was for a while attracted to PND politics and also wrote poetry. An engineer by trade, he was headmaster of the Bucharest Electrotechnical College in the late 1930s. Another son, Ștefan N. Iorga, was a writer active with the Cuget Clar movement, and later a noted physician.

Iorga's niece Micaella Filitti, who worked as a civil servant in the 1930s, defected from Communist Romania and settled in France. Later descendants include historian Andrei Pippidi, son of Dionisie, who is noted as a main editor of Iorga's writings. Pippidi also prefaced collections of Iorga's correspondence, and published a biographical synthesis on his grandfather. Andrei Pippidi is married to political scientist and journalist Alina Mungiu, the sister of award-winning filmmaker Cristian Mungiu.

== Sources ==
- Nation and National Ideology. Past, Present and Prospects. Proceedings of the International Symposium Held at the New Europe College, Center for the Study of the Imaginary & New Europe College, Bucharest, 2002, pp. 117–121. ISBN 973-98624-9-7; See:
  - Irina Livezeanu, "After the Great Union: Generational Tensions, Intellectuals, Modernism, and Ethnicity in Interwar Romania", pp. 110–127
  - Sorin Alexandrescu, "Towards a Modern Theory of Romanian Nationalism in the Interwar Period", pp. 138–164
- Paul Blokker, "Romania at the Intersection of Different Europes: Implications of a Pluri-civilizational Encounter", in Johann P. Arnason, Natalie J. Doyle, Domains and Divisions of European History, Liverpool University Press, Liverpool, 2010, pp. 161–180. ISBN 978-1-84631-214-4
- Lucian Boia,
  - Istorie și mit în conștiința românească, Humanitas, Bucharest, 2000. ISBN 973-50-0055-5
  - "Germanofilii". Elita intelectuală românească în anii Primului Război Mondial, Humanitas, Bucharest, 2010. ISBN 978-973-50-2635-6
- (in French) Ioana Both, " 'Mihai Eminescu – Poète National Roumain.' Histoire et Anatomie d'un Mythe Culturel", in The New Europe College Yearbook 1997–1998, New Europe College, Bucharest, 2000, pp. 9–70. ISBN 973-98624-5-4
- G. Brătescu, Ce-a fost să fie. Notații autobiografice, Humanitas, Bucharest, 2003. ISBN 973-50-0425-9
- (in Romanian) Lucian T. Butaru, Rasism românesc. Componenta rasială a discursului antisemit din România, până la Al Doilea Război Mondial, Editura Fundației pentru Studii Europene, Cluj-Napoca, 2010. ISBN 978-606-526-051-1
- George Călinescu, Istoria literaturii române de la origini pînă în prezent, Editura Minerva, Bucharest, 1986
- Paul Cernat, Avangarda românească și complexul periferiei: primul val, Cartea Românească, Bucharest, 2007. ISBN 978-973-23-1911-6
- George Ciprian, Mascărici și mîzgălici. Amintiri, Editura de stat pentru literatură și artă, Bucharest, 1958. OCLC 7288521
- Marcel Cornis-Pope, John Neubauer (eds.), History of the Literary Cultures of East-Central Europe, Vol. II, John Benjamins, Amsterdam & Philadelphia, 2004. ISBN 90-272-3453-1; See:
  - Monica Spiridon, "On the Borders of Mighty Empires: Bucharest, City of Merging Paradigms", pp. 93–105
  - John Neubauer, Marcel Cornis-Pope, Sándor Kibédi-Varga, Nicolae Harsanyi, "Transylvania's Literary Cultures: Rivalry and Interaction", pp. 245–283
- R. J. Crampton, Eastern Europe in the Twentieth Century – and after, Routledge, London, 1997. ISBN 0-415-16423-0
- Ovid Crohmălniceanu, Literatura română între cele două războaie mondiale, Vol. I, Editura Minerva, Bucharest, 1972. OCLC 490001217
- Mihaela Czobor-Lupp, "The Tension between Philosophy, History and Politics in Forging the Meaning of Civil Society in Romanian Philosophical Culture", in Magdalena Dumitrana (ed.), Romania: Cultural Identity and Education for Civil Society. Romanian Philosophical Studies, V. Cultural Heritage and Contemporary Change, Series IVA, Eastern and Central Europe, Volume 24, Council for Research in Values and Philosophy, Washington, 2004, pp. 91–134. ISBN 1-56518-209-X
- Dennis Deletant, Hitler's Forgotten Ally: Ion Antonescu and His Regime, Romania, 1940–1944, Palgrave Macmillan, London, 2006. ISBN 1-4039-9341-6
- Neagu Djuvara, Între Orient și Occident. Țările române la începutul epocii moderne, Humanitas, Bucharest, 1995. ISBN 973-28-0523-4
- Vasile Drăguț, Vasile Florea, Dan Grigorescu, Marin Mihalache, Pictura românească în imagini, Editura Meridiane, Bucharest, 1970. OCLC 5717220
- Dan Grigorescu, Istoria unei generații pierdute: expresioniștii, Editura Eminescu, Bucharest, 1980. OCLC 7463753
- Francesco Guida, "Federal Projects in Interwar Romania: An Overvaulting Ambition?", in Marta Petricioli, Donatella Cherubini (eds.), For Peace in Europe: Institutions and Civil Society between the World Wars, Peter Lang AG, Brussels, 2007, pp. 229–257. ISBN 978-90-5201-364-0
- Victor Iova, "Tabel cronologic", in N. Iorga, Istoria lui Mihai Viteazul, Vol. I, Editura Minerva, Bucharest, 1979, pp. xxvii–lvi. OCLC 6422662
- Traian D. Lazăr, "O parte a 'clanului Iorga' ", in Magazin Istoric, June 2011, pp. 41–44
- Lucian Nastasă,
  - Intelectualii și promovarea socială (pentru o morfologie a câmpului universitar), Editura Nereamia Napocae, Cluj-Napoca, 2003
  - "Suveranii" universităților românești. Mecanisme de selecție și promovare a elitei intelectuale, Vol. I, Editura Limes, Cluj-Napoca, 2007. ISBN 978-973-726-278-3
- John Neubauer, "Conflicts and Cooperation between the Romanian, Hungarian, and Saxon Literary Elites in Transylvania, 1850–1945", in Victor Karady, Borbála Zsuzsanna Török (eds.), Cultural Dimensions of Elite Formation in Transylvania (1770–1950), Ethnocultural Diversity Resource Center, Cluj-Napoca, 2008, p. 159–185. ISBN 978-973-86239-6-5
- Stejărel Olaru, Georg Herbstritt (eds.), Vademekum Contemporary History Romania. A Guide through Archives, Research Institutions, Libraries, Societies, Museums and Memorial Places, Romanian Institute for Recent History, Stiftung für Aufarbeitung der SED-Diktatur, Berlin & Bucharest, 2004
- William O. Oldson, A Providential Anti-Semitism. Nationalism and Polity in Nineteenth-Century Romania, American Philosophical Society, Philadelphia, 1991. ISBN 0-87169-193-0
- Z. Ornea,
  - Anii treizeci. Extrema dreaptă românească, Editura Fundației Culturale Române, Bucharest, 1995. ISBN 973-9155-43-X
  - Junimea și junimismul, Vol. II, Editura Minerva, Bucharest, 1998. ISBN 973-21-0562-3
- Ovidiu Pecican, Regionalism românesc. Organizare prestatală și stat la nordul Dunării în perioada medivală și modernă, Editura Curtea Veche, Bucharest, 2009. ISBN 978-973-669-631-2
- Sorin Radu, "Semnele electorale ale partidelor politice în perioada interbelică", in the National Museum of the Union Apulum Yearbook, Vol. XXXIX, 2002, pp. 573–586
- (in French) Mihai Sorin Rădulescu, "Sur l'aristocratie roumaine de l'entre-deux-guerres", in The New Europe College Yearbook 1996–1997, New Europe College, Bucharest, 2000, pp. 339–365. ISBN 973-98624-4-6
- Tom Sandqvist, Dada East. The Romanians of Cabaret Voltaire, MIT Press, Cambridge, Massachusetts & London, 2006. ISBN 0-262-19507-0
- Stefano Santoro, L'Italia e l'Europa orientale: diplomazia culturale e propaganda 1918–1943, FrancoAngeli, Milan, 2005. ISBN 88-464-6473-7
- Hugh Seton-Watson, Eastern Europe between the Wars, 1918–1941, Cambridge University Press, Cambridge, 1945. OCLC 463173616
- Hugh Seton-Watson, Christopher Seton-Watson, The Making of a New Europe. R.W. Seton-Watson and the Last Years of Austria-Hungary, Methuen Publishing, London, 1981. ISBN 0-416-74730-2
- Kenneth Setton, The Papacy and the Levant, 1204–1571. Volume II: The Fifteenth Century, American Philosophical Society, Philadelphia, 1997. ISBN 0-87169-127-2
- Ioan Stanomir,
  - Spiritul conservator. De la Barbu Catargiu la Nicolae Iorga, Editura Curtea Veche, Bucharest, 2008. ISBN 978-973-669-521-6
  - "Un pămînt numit România", in Paul Cernat, Angelo Mitchievici, Ioan Stanomir, Explorări în comunismul românesc, Polirom, Iași, 2008, pp. 261–328. ISBN 973-681-794-6
- Nicolae Șerban Tanașoca, "Aperçus of the History of Balkan Romanity", in Răzvan Theodorescu, Leland Conley Barrows (eds.), Studies on Science and Culture. Politics and Culture in Southeastern Europe, UNESCO-CEPES, Bucharest, 2001, pp. 94–170. OCLC 61330237
- Maria Todorova, Imagining the Balkans, Oxford University Press, Oxford etc., 2009. ISBN 978-0-19-538786-5
- Petre Țurlea, "Vodă da, Iorga ba", in Magazin Istoric, February 2001, pp. 43–47
- Francisco Veiga, Istoria Gărzii de Fier, 1919–1941: Mistica ultranaționalismului, Humanitas, Bucharest, 1993. ISBN 973-28-0392-4
- Tudor Vianu, Scriitori români, Vols. I-III, Editura Minerva, Bucharest, 1970–1971. OCLC 7431692
- George Voicu, "The 'Judaisation' of the Enemy in the Romanian Political Culture at the Beginning of the 20th Century", in the Babeș-Bolyai University Studia Judaica, 2007, pp. 138–150
- Leon Volovici, Nationalist Ideology and Antisemitism. The Case of Romanian Intellectuals in the 1930s, Pergamon Press, Oxford etc., 1991. ISBN 0-08-041024-3
- (in Romanian) Alexandru Zub, "Istoricul în fața duratei imediate: aportul ego-istoriei", in Istoria recentă în Europa. Obiecte de studiu, surse, metode etice ale studiului istoriei recente. Lucrările simpozionului internațional organizat de Colegiul Noua Europă, New Europe College, Bucharest, 2002, pp. 33–51. ISBN 973-85697-0-2

Political offices
| Preceded by Alexandru Vaida-Voevod | President of the Assembly of Deputies; 1919–1920 | Succeeded by Duiliu Zamfirescu |
| Preceded by Gheorghe Mironescu | Prime Minister of Romania; 1931–1932 | Succeeded by Alexandru Vaida-Voevod |
| Preceded by Ion Mihalache | Minister of Internal Affairs; 1931 | Succeeded by Constantin Argetoianu; Acting |
| Preceded by Alexandru Lapedatu | President of the Romanian Senate; 1939 | Succeeded by Constantin Argetoianu |
