= Vasile Pogor =

Romanian politician and academic (1833–1906)

Vasile V. Pogor
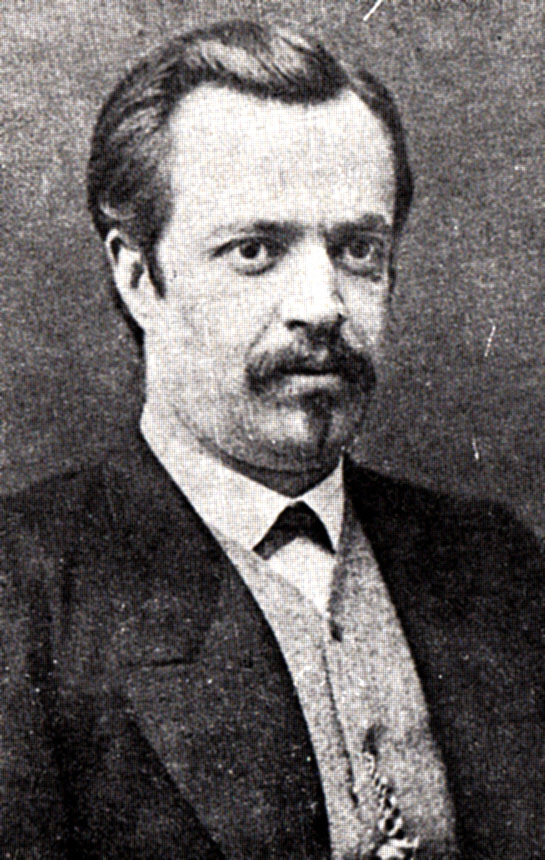
- Born: August 20, 1833; Iași, Moldavia
- Died: March 20, 1906 (aged 72); Bucium-Iași, Kingdom of Romania

Philosophical work
- Era: 19th-century philosophy
- Region: Western; Eastern
- School: Junimea, Evolutionism, Positivism, Environmental determinism, Liberal conservatism, Freethought
- Main interests: philosophy of history, Romanian philosophy, Buddhist studies

Vasile V. Pogor (Cyrillic: Вaciлe Пoгop; Francized Basile Pogor; August 20, 1833 – March 20, 1906) was a Moldavian, later Romanian poet, philosopher, translator and liberal conservative politician, one of the founders of Junimea literary society. Raised among the boyar nobility of Iași, he was the son of a similarly named poet-polemicist and translator. Vasile Jr was educated in the French Empire, and had his first career in law. He became a civil servant during the United Principalities regime, though he split with its leadership on matters of tax policy, making his fortune as a conspirator in the "monstrous coalition" coup of February 1866. He held seats and commissions in the Assembly of Deputies. In forming Junimea, alongside Titu Maiorescu and others, Pogor sought to counter the intellectual supremacy of Romantic nationalism and "Red" liberalism, by introducing a critical approach to nation-building. He supported Romania's Westernization within a conservative framework, tempering nationalist presumptions and valuing a culturally pluralistic society. Early on, he participated in the Junimist effort to diversify cultural influences, producing two separate translations of Faust I (at least one of which was in collaboration with Nicolai Skelitti).

Although he had a major role in creating the Conservative Party, by fusing together the various "White" political clubs and Masonic Lodges, Pogor was more loyal to the Junimist inner faction, and stood by it when it split with the other Conservatives. He also represented the Positivist cell at Junimea. An irreligious evolutionist, and a reader of Arthur Schopenhauer's work, he eventually came to embrace Buddhism; this stance resulted in his promoting Buddhist studies and Eastern philosophy in general. He also stood out as one of the first locals to study the work of Henry Thomas Buckle, integrating Bucklean concepts into Junimea's ideology. The notoriously indolent and improvident Pogor had a preference for orality, and was sought after for his Voltairian wit. He left few written works, and many unfulfilled projects, but influenced Romanian literature as a cultural promoter, sponsor, and the first local expert on Charles Baudelaire. He was known to his Junimea colleagues as a one-man "contemporary library".

After the proclamation of the Kingdom of Romania, Pogor served several terms as Mayor of Iași City; as such, he helped establish Iași National Theatre, and experimented with the Romanianization of urban culture. His final decades were spent away from the national scene, although he still took on assignments in the Conservative and Junimist chapters of Iași County. Casa Pogor, his main residence, is closely associated with Junimist history. Although sold by its debt-stricken owner in 1901, it was revived in the 1970s as a literary history museum, theater venue and concert hall. Married to the Russian aristocrat Elena Hartingh, Pogor left an illegitimate son, Vasile Panopol.

== Biography ==
=== Origins and childhood ===
According to various accounts, the Pogors were a clan of yeomen from the eponymous Pogorăști, raised into boyar nobility ca. 1820. The family's own pedigree claimed otherwise, namely that its members had been "enjoying native privileges" since ancient times. On the basis of such claims, Vasile Pogor Sr had a steady climb through the Moldavian civilian and military bureaucracy: he began his career as a Serdar (1819), before being made a Comis for life. During his 1816–1823 mission into the Bessarabian Governorate, Russian Empire, Pogor kidnapped Zoița Cerchez, granddaughter of a local Clucer. From this marriage, he had three daughters—Antonia, Eleonora, Smaranda—and a son, the future poet. By the time of his birth, the family owned large boyar estates in both Vaslui County (including Buhăiești and Râșești) and Bessarabia.

As a political poet in the Age of Revolution, Comis Pogor looked back with disgust on the late Phanariote period and the Eterist invasion, satirizing the ambitions of Greek immigrants to Moldavia. In the late 1830s, he would be equally opposed to the Moldavian status quo, criticizing the heavy-handed Moldavian sovereign Mihail Sturdza. His rhyming pamphlets envisaged equality before the law, their author having signed up to the "Confederative Conspiracy", planned by Moldavia's proto-liberal boyardom. He still held several high political-judicial offices in the last quarter of Sturdza, including the Agie and the Justice Department chairmanship.

Pogor Sr's worldview also owed much to his familiarity with French literature. He corresponded with Chateaubriand, wishing to publish his poetry in a Moldavian edition, but is probably best known as Voltaire's first Romanian-language translator. His version of the Henriade was published in neighboring Wallachia by the liberal intellectual Ion Heliade Rădulescu. It and other translations by the Comis (Zaïre, Désastre de Lisbonne) may prove that Pogor the younger was already familiar with Voltaire and Voltarianism from early childhood.

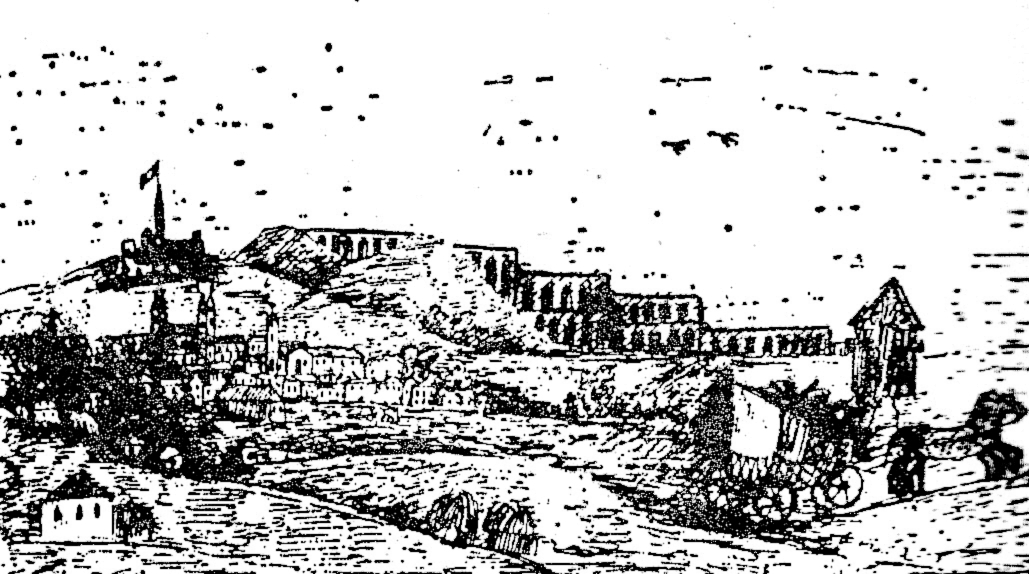
Teodor Veisa's drawing of the 1849 departure for Kraków

Born in Iași, the Moldavian capital, Vasile Jr was selected for the most modern forms of education available to Moldavians living in the 1840s. He first attended the liberal arts' school of Frenchman Malgoverné, and, in addition to discovering an interest in literature, became a skilled amateur draftsman. In October 1849, young Pogor took the stagecoach ride to Kraków, and then the train to Paris, accompanied by the boyar heirs Heraclide, Porfiriu, Miclescu and Teodor Veisa, and chaperoned by Malgoverné himself. The scene of their departure from Iași is preserved in a sketch drawing by Veisa, which shows the enthusiastic adolescents leaning out the carriage doors.

=== French and German education ===
Pogor completed his education in France. He is widely seen as formed by French education, but, according to cultural sociologist Zigu Ornea, this is only part of the story: Pogor did not graduate from a lycée, but was actually trained at a Germanophone boarding school; was not introduced to Bonapartism, but to "the ideological principles of Restoration". As argued by author Gheorghe Manolache, Pogor was one of those who saw French culture as "speculative", and sought to amend its influence with German or Anglophone borrowings. In late 1851, he took an extended study trip through the German Confederation, in lieu of service in the Moldavian military forces. The Moldavian state granted him dispensation, and awarded him the rank of Cadet.

Pogor was subsequently enlisted at the University of Paris Law School, where he took his doctorate in law. His contact with the Parisian salons was of major formative importance: he was an avid reader and, as literary historian Tudor Vianu notes, "always open to new things, ready to defeat prejudice", if rather indiscriminate. Pogor's one constant was the study of the classics: he reread Homer's Iliad and Odyssey once every year. His other known pursuits were non-academic. Pogor discovered comédie en vaudeville theater, kept company with mature women, and began fantasizing about writing his own novels and short stories.

The Pogors enjoyed high political profiles during and after the Crimean War, when the Moldavian and Wallachian principalities became a condominium of the Great Powers. Before his death in 1857, Pogor Sr was head of the appellate court (Divanul de apel, later Curtea de apel), and one of the boyars tasked with welcoming in the foreign overseers. Upon his return to Moldavia, the young lawyer became sole owner of a palatial residence, Casa Pogor, built by his father in 1850, on land previously owned by the Cerchez and Coroi boyars. He also took assignments in the judicial apparatus. He was a judge in Iași from 1857 to 1858, and a member of the appellate court after March 1859. Although cutting the figure of an eccentric among the stern bureaucrats, he managed to impress Costache Negruzzi, his hierarchical superior and celebrated novelist. In his account, Pogor displayed "something rare in our folk": "a great feeling for justice".

The Pogors still maintained close links with the areas on the other side of the Prut River: Antonia Pogor became the wife of Bessarabian boyar Dumitru Bantîș. When he married the Bessarabian heiress Elena Hartingh, Vasile established a connection with Russian nobility. His father-in-law was a Karl "Scarlat" Hartingh (or Garting), owner of an estate in Pohrebeni. Elena's grandfather was Ivan Markovich Garting, an ethnic Finn who had served as Bessarabian Governor; her grandmother, "Elenco" Hartinga, was closely related to the high-ranking boyardom of Moldavia.

=== Junimea creation ===
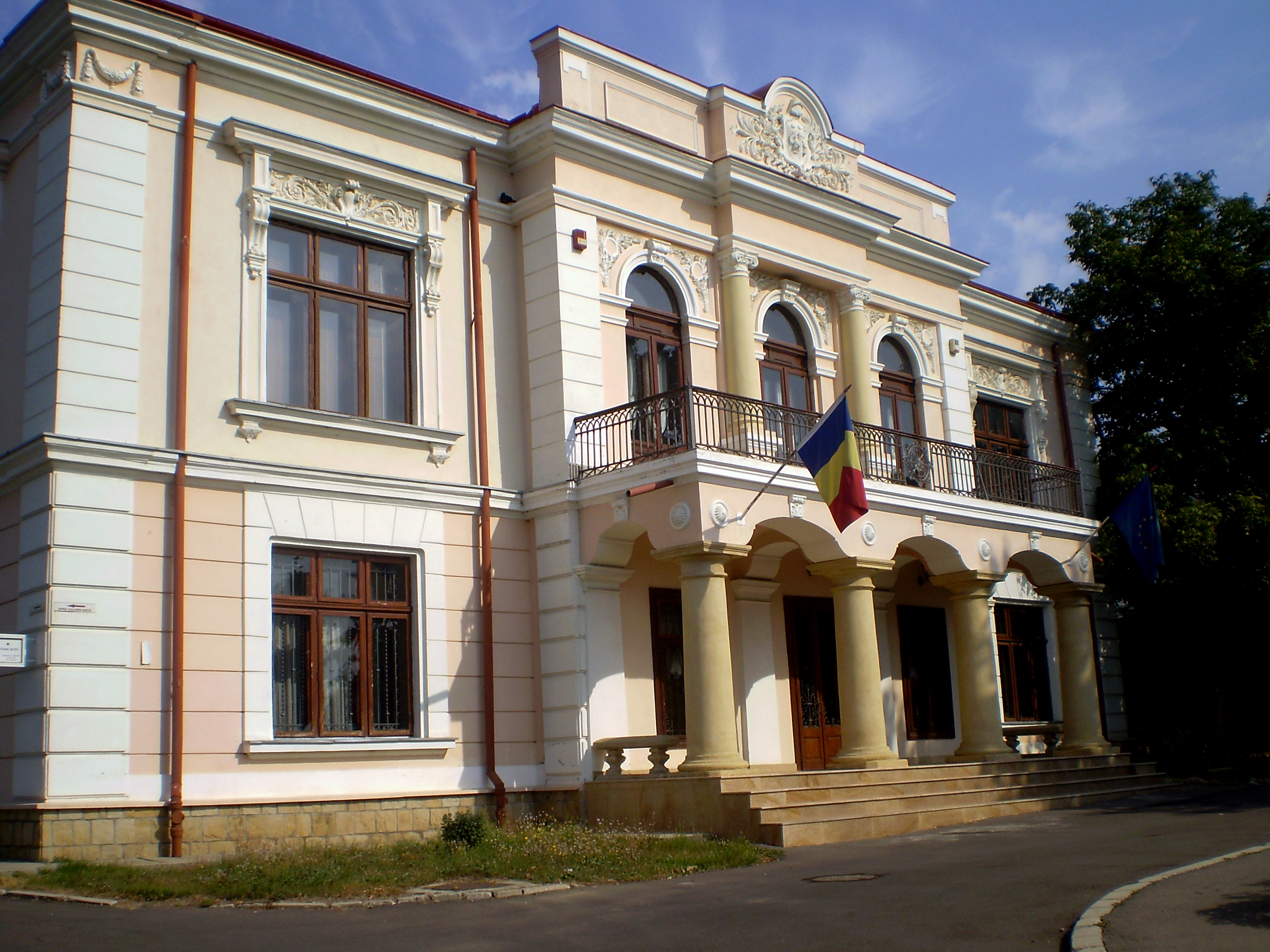
Casa Pogor in 2009

From early 1859, Moldavia and Wallachia formed a single Romanian state, known as the "United Principalities" and ruled upon by Domnitor Alexandru Ioan Cuza. Still employed by the Moldavian appellate court under Cuza's regime, Pogor objected to the fiscal policies of Premier Nicolae Kretzulescu. In early 1863, he split with the pro-Cuza camp, attempting to lead tax resistance in Moldavia; this resulted in him being stripped of his government job. His resignation was recorded in September 1863, shortly followed by his colleague Alexandru Papadopol-Calimah. By then, he had resumed his literary projects. The first achievement of Pogor's work as a translator was his retelling of Goethe's Faust I, with Nicolai Skelitti as co-author, saw print in 1862. Samples of his own poetry were published by the pro-Cuza magazine Din Moldova, whose editor was a future enemy, the Romantic novelist and scholar Bogdan Petriceicu Hasdeu.

The United Principalities era saw Pogor's activity blending into the cultural projects of Junimea literary society. Founded in stages ca. 1863, that club was originally focused on literary debates and popular education. Its founders were five young graduates, all but one of them boyars. Pogor and Theodor Rosetti were French-trained; Petre P. Carp and Iacob Negruzzi (Costache's son) had studied in the German Confederation. The fifth was Titu Maiorescu, an upper-middle-class intellectual trained in both French and German schools, generally seen as the leading voice of Junimism, the cultural and political concept.

Little is known about the first years of Junimism. The five founders left only a handful of notes on the subject, and discouraged others from investigating the topic. Pogor himself mystified on the subject: he laughed off the historiographic attempts and, playfully reusing a literary cliché, informed newer members of the club that "Junimea's origin is lost in the mist of time". His version of events subverted other accounts, including the vague memoirs of Iacob Negruzzi. Pogor thus claimed that Junimea existed in large part because of him. In Pogor's account, the first manifestation of what would become Junimea was a study group comprising himself, Skelitti, Papadopol-Calimah, Theodor Aslan, Iorgu Gane, Ioan Ianov, and some other prominent Iași intellectuals; to the irritation of other Junimists, he constantly backdated Junimea's existence to 1862. His account is not validated by the written records, and other sources (themselves scanty) suggest that, although invited by Maiorescu, Pogor did not in fact attend the so-called "first Junimea meeting" (February 9, 1864).

Pogor was nonetheless present at other (possibly earlier) gatherings, which gave a more formal status to the reunions. In his half-mythical narrative of events, presented at later Junimea banquets, Pogor insisted that the first day of Junimism was a Friday (vineri), and that, as such, the club was under the divine patronage of Venus. Based on the available reconstructions of events, the club's name seems to have been selected by Rosetti, and ceremoniously validated by Pogor—whom the other founders already recognized as their enfant terrible. The resulting society had little in the way of a published program, but the generic lines, including efforts to rationalize the spelling of Romanian and to provide affordable education, survive in one of I. Negruzzi's letters.

Pogor's large townhouse is popularly understood as the Junimea headquarters, but, at least initially, the club also met at Maiorescu's place, and occasionally at Negruzzi's. Indirectly, the young boyar helped found the club's own printing press, which was donated to Maiorescu by Pogor's Bessarabian cousin, the philanthropist Nicolae Ștefan Casso, and, after 1867, the literary sheet Convorbiri Literare. The latter's mailing address was Casa Pogor. Pogor himself managed the publishing firm, but did a notoriously poor job. Described by Ornea as "a man for all the hasty projects" and as an "absent-minded" individual, Pogor ran heavy debts and frequently changed managers (Ioan Mire Melik, Al. Farra etc.). The Junimist publishing house was barely keeping afloat once Pogor took money out of the budget to create a book store—one of such niche appeal as to make Pogor the only buyer of his books.

=== Provocateur, anthologist, lecturer ===
At Junimea, Pogor was a picturesque figure. Ornea suggests that, despite being a respectable boyar and the oldest among the founders, Pogor was also the most "child-like" in his reactions. Witnesses recall that he was always amused by the literary works presented for analysis, laughing "till his new teeth jumped out of his mouth", and casually reclining on a sofa as the debates were taking place. Negruzzi recalled that, in defiance for "any social habit", Pogor left his guests unattended to read his books; he writes that, on first impression, Pogor appeared "cheeky and missing something upstairs". Moreover, Pogor embarrassed his friends with his obscene anecdotes, his name-calling, and his occasional outbursts, during which he would hurl his cape at them.

However, Pogor's lolling habit and thundering laughter soon became fashionable, and his yawning during the others' recitations was intentionally loud, provocative and contagious. He justified such heckling with the expression Entre qui veut, reste qui peut (French for "enters who wishes, stays on who can stand it"), later a Junimea motto. The slogan resonated with the caracudă ("small game") wing of Junimea—mostly passive youngsters who came in for entertainment, and who, Ornea notes, were "apparently immune to beauty and ignorant". For all his unorthodox stances, Pogor was regarded by all his colleagues as a towering intellect, and referred to as "the contemporary library". The Junimist colleagues repeatedly noted that he was the man to bring in not just irreverence, but also genuine innovation. Vianu describes his "merciless gibes" as stemming from a conviction that the others were too uptight, and in general from a rejection of "dogmatism"; Pogor, he writes, would "embrace in turn all sorts of attitudes". Another scholar, Șerban Cioculescu, describes Pogor as by character "a free, unambitious, spirit, an epicurean of intelligence". Similarly, Ornea cautions: "If Maiorescu has conferred a consistent substance to Junimea, then Pogor gave it a pinch of salt, wit, humor and—an essential element—skepticism, that is to say a sense of relativity."

Encouraged by the other club members, Pogor became the anthologist of bad journalism and literature, scouring anti-Junimist periodicals and picking out the most amusing enormities and the most embarrassing platitudes. These he then pasted into his Dosar ("Dossier"), which is for most part a subtle political attack on the "Red" ideology of Romanian liberalism and Romantic nationalism. Ornea notes: "those who have discussed the Junimea Dossier as politics in disguise, practiced by a literary circle that had denied itself—under pain of sanction—any politically derived conversation, they were not at all in the wrong." Already in 1863, the Junimists had engaged in battle the literary representatives of Romanian liberalism, including Din Moldova's B. P. Hasdeu. The latter dedicated his activity as a journalist to deriding or condemning the Junimea group, Pogor included, accusing it of standing for values not complementary with the Romanian way: cosmopolitanism and Germanophilia, elitism and philosemitism.

While these debates gathered in notoriety, Pogor was also joining in the yearly cycle of Junimea conferences, or prelecțiuni. He, Maiorescu, and Carp were the core group of lecturers during the first age of the prelecțiuni. The subjects were broad and the inspiration spontaneous, but the speakers still followed Maiorescu's elaborate ceremonial, which reduced direct contact with the listeners. In 1864, Pogor discussed the French Revolution, and specifically its "impact on modern ideas". There was a break in the following year, with Maiorescu having been involved in a sex scandal, but the lecturers returned in 1866, when the common theme was "factors of national life throughout history". Pogor was also contributing to the Junimea who's who of Romanian poetry, selecting for reading pieces by the 18th-century boyar Ienăchiță Văcărescu. At the prelecțiuni, Pogor spoke about Ancient Greek art; in 1867, about Shakespearean tragedy; during later cycles, he discovered and introduced for the general public the philosophy of Arthur Schopenhauer. Still focused on national identity constructs and the philosophy of history, he promoted at Junimea the evolutionist treatise History of Civilization in England, by Henry Thomas Buckle.

=== Masonic conspirator and "White" organizer ===
As a politician, in early 1863 Pogor was one of the names proposed to the Assembly of Deputies as manager of a proposed farm credit system. He was increasingly drawn into secretive, then conspiratorial, work. Pogor in Iași, and Carp in Bucharest, helped organize the February 1866 putsch against the authoritarian Cuza, and supported the interim government presided upon by both liberal "Reds" and conservative "Whites". On February 15, the Romanian Regency appointed Pogor Prefect of Iași County, and he was also a regional representative in the Assembly (quickly elected for the drafting of a new constitution). On April 28, he was elected as one of its secretaries. For most of the year, he had a noted role in persuading his colleagues to accept bicameralism, and thus contributed to the establishment of the Senate of Romania. In March, he was also sent back to the appellate court, as section president, serving until January 1868. According to scholar George Călinescu, he began supplementing his revenue with "multiple and ephemeral" special commissions, including that of teacher certification examiner (October 1866).

Pogor was received into the Freemasonry (Oriental Rite of Memphis, Grand Orient de France) on March 14, 1866, and, only a year later, reached the 90th Masonic Degree. Within the divided Romanian Freemasonry, he sided with the Moldavian Lodge called "Star of Romania": he was the Orator under Venerable Master Iorgu Sutzu. Joined by most of the Junimist personalities, this institution would open up a new front against the "Reds", challenging their xenophobia and antisemitism. The Lodge opened its ranks to people of various backgrounds, including Romanian Jews, but was off-limits to the Moldavian liberals. The Lodge members, Pogor and Maiorescu included, set up and helped edit a "White" political sheet, Constituțiunea ("Constitution"), later Gazeta de Iassi. Initially, the paper joined the ranks of Moldavian regionalists, complaining about Iași's social, cultural, and demographic decline under Romanian rule; however, by March 30, Pogor and Maiorescu had also affiliated with the centralizing National Party, where they talked of finding other roles for the declining former capital. Against separatists such as Constantin Moruzi and the Free and Independent Faction, they sought a cemented union, proposing the selection of a foreign ruler from Romance-speaking Europe.

With the arrival on the throne of a German prince, Carol of Hohenzollern-Sigmaringen, the anti-Cuza coalition was again divided into competing factions. However, Ornea writes, just two Junimist leaders had openly engaged in party politics: "Petre Carp and—unbelievably so!—the freaky V. Pogor." This despite the fact that Iași's Masonic Lodge had become a junior wing of the "White" party, and was portrayed by the local "Red" polemicists as an anti-Christian fraternity. No longer committed to the principle of a "Latin" prince, Pogor openly supported the new Domnitor—he was one of 109 deputies (from a total 115) to ratify the April plebiscite. The "Star of Romania" Lodge invited Carol to join its ranks and become leader of the unified Freemasonry. Around 1867, against antisemitic agitation by the Free and Independent Faction, the Junimist core, Pogor included, signed up to a proposal for Jewish emancipation, meaning the Jewish minority's effective naturalization. Probably initiated by the "Star of Romania", their petition asked Domnitor Carol to "establish legal order" in front of "anarchy", noting that the liberals worked to "kidnap hundreds of Jews".

By 1869, Pogor and Carp had also rallied with the Society of Young Dynasticists, which conspired with dissident liberals such as Gheorghe Mârzescu to elect only monarchists into office—for instance, during 1869. The early 1870s transformed Junimea into a moderate conservative political movement, annexed to the "White" wing of the political spectrum. For Maiorescu, theirs was the cause of restoration and order in front of "Red" agitation (the Republic of Ploiești episode), but also adverse to the "arch-conservatives" who wanted a return of boyar privileges. Within this setting, Pogor found that his political status progressed quickly: from January 1869 to May 1870, he was president of the appellate court. Yet, as Tudor Vianu notes, he still treated political assignments "with a certain indifference."

At the beginning of that decade, "White" Premier Manolache Costache Epureanu opened his cabinet to Junimist experts, and Pogor was expected to take over a top administrative position. Carp, who negotiated the deal, vouched for Pogor's competence. Pogor resigned before the so-called "Hen and Fledgling" cabinet was even sworn in. Reportedly, he complained of dorsopathy, leaving Maiorescu worried that he had developed neurosyphilis. Pogor declared himself cured within a few days, announcing that he was ready to take over as Romania's Minister of Education. According to various sources, he actually held the office, if only briefly. His unexpected renunciation cleared the path for Maiorescu's own political ascent, moving him from a position in the background to the "Fledgling" Education portfolio.

=== Convorbiri Literare editor and 1871 mandate ===
Pogor still was a notable participant in polemics, taking Maiorescu's side. One such case was that of disputes between the Junimists and an ultra-"White" group headed by Epureanu. The latter wanted to institute an authoritarian regime favoring the upper class and favored some exotic policies—generalizing the death penalty or opening the country to massive German colonization. Probably wishing to maintain "White" unity, the Junimists, including Pogor, gave reluctant backing to the Epureanu program, and became targets for "Red" sarcasm, and were even chided by the dominant conservative club, that of Lascăr Catargiu. Pogor was also chairman of the Junimist "Society for Sending Young Romanians on Study Trips", noted for discovering and sponsoring the future atheistic philosopher Vasile Conta. For a while in 1871, he was also leader of the Physicians' Society.

In parallel with his political chores, Pogor took up the task of translating some of Charles Baudelaire's Flowers of Evil. "Don Juan in Hell" and "Gipsies on the Road" were both published by Convorbiri in March 1870. Before this moment, Baudelaire's work had been entirely unknown to Romanians, and casually ignored by Maiorescu, who preferred German Romanticism. Later, Pogor published adapted samples from other modern French figures (Victor Hugo, Théophile Gautier, Leconte de Lisle, Sully Prudhomme, Jean Richepin) alternating them with classical works by Horace (Ode III.26, in 1871) and Virgil (Copa, in 1873). He and other Convorbiri Literare writers pioneered translations from American literature, most notably from the stories of Edgar Allan Poe. This was still just a fraction of Pogor's activity in the field. His papers reveal that he had also tried, but failed, to translate, among others, Rameau's Nephew by Diderot, Ludwig Uhland's "The Minstrel's Curse", and Volney's Les Ruines.

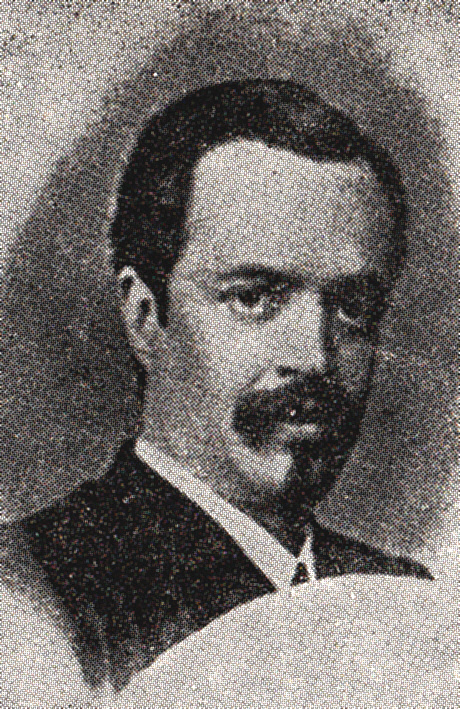
Pogor in 1873

In addition to his translation projects, Convorbiri Literare hosted his original works, beginning with the autobiographical piece "A Marquise's Pastel" (September 1868). In January 1871, still independent of party politics, the journal was reorganized as a cultural monthly. Pogor was assigned to the editorial committee, a triumvirate also grouping Maiorescu and Negruzzi. He and Maiorescu resigned soon after, alleging that Negruzzi had failed to consult them about the editorial policy, possibly because of a polemical review inserted by Ștefan Vârgolici. This did not imply that they would cease to write for Convorbiri. Also that year, the magazine published a poem by Pogor's deceased father, newly discovered in the family archive. In October, when Junimea finally liquidated its publishing venture, Pogor was asked to take care of the debts and return the debit. Without Negruzzi's knowledge, the enterprise was purchased by the Jewish businessman Herșcu Goldner.

Meanwhile, Hasdeu's Columna lui Traian paper had made it its mission to host samples from Pogor's poetry, to show its readers how one was not supposed to versify. Hasdeu registered a moral victory when a short poem by an "M. I. Ellias" saw print in the July 15 issue of Convorbiri Literare. With Maiorescu in Bucharest, the piece had earned the approval of both Pogor and his younger rival, Mihai Eminescu. It was, in fact, a prank. Hasdeu had improvised the poem himself (calling it "a rhyming frivolity") so as to prove that Junimea writers lacked taste and patriotic feeling—"there is not a galimatias [...] that Convorbiri Literare won't rush in to grab and hold by its bosom, provided one essential condition is met: that it does not include anything Romanian."

During 1870, when Pogor and Maiorescu acted as autisde auditors for the festivities at Putna Monastery, they came into contact with both Eminescu and Ioan Slavici. Their selection of a festive speech, given by their colleague A. D. Xenopol, caused an uproar among more radical Romanian nationalists, who wished to boycott the event. The Junimist faction made its formal entry into Parliament after the 1871 election. As a result of these, the nation's Assembly of Deputies included five Junimist members, voting with the "White" group: Pogor, Maiorescu, Negruzzi, Nicolae Gane, Gheorghe Racoviță. After the partial elections of 1874, they were joined by two others: Carp (previously serving Domnitor Carol as a diplomat) and Th. Rosetti. As noted by his contemporaries, Pogor, even though selected as Vice President of the Assembly, was not an asset for the Junimist faction. George Panu, the Junimea memoirist, noted that Pogor was an incompetent public speaker, rarely present at the rostrum. When he did address the Assembly, Pogor was unrecognizable and "embarrassing", turning "pale as a cadaver", his voice "shaking" with timidity.

=== Bucharest relocation and 1875 mandate ===
Pogor's own prolonged absences, like the political passions of other Junimist founders, were a cause for concern in Iași. Those who had stayed behind, Negruzzi included, complained that the club was dying out, with the reunions turning into glorified tea parties. As such, all the Junimea founders except Negruzzi were absent from the club's meeting on February 25, 1872. In the end, when Negruzzi also accepted a government job, the club was reestablished to the national capital, Bucharest. The small Iași section survived for a while as a caracudă hotspot, experiencing what Ornea called "a slow and embarrassing ending". Pogor paid the occasional visit and, according to caracudă leader N. Gane, behaved with restraint ("against his nature"). This was the time of Pogor's polemics with Eminescu. The latter, a voice of national conservatism, and recognized by posterity as the Romanian national poet, read out his fantasy novella Sărmanul Dionis. As Junimea minutes will attest, Pogor and Maiorescu found the work to be all to cryptic, but still gave approval for its publishing. For a few months in 1874, Pogor allowed the penniless poet to lodge with him. Sources diverge on whether Eminescu lived at Casa Pogor or another one of the politician's townhouses, which has since been demolished.

By the close of his mandate in the Assembly, Pogor had involved himself in the Strousberg Affair dispute, suggesting (unsuccessfully) that ministers found guilty of misdeeds should have their revenue retained by the state. The Catargiu cabinet was facing a motion of no confidence over its stamp act proposal, with Pogor and Carp working to keep the two debates separate. He was again sent to the Assembly in the 1875 election, during which the "Red" opposition ran as a consolidated National Liberal Party (PNL). During this term, Pogor supported the establishment of a public railways authority, with compensation for other shareholders.

Pogor, who had also been reelected chairman of the Iași appellate court, declined an invitation to become judge at the High Court of Cassation. Despite the looming PNL threat, he and N. Gane were absentee deputies, and were probably convinced that the Catargiu cabinet was about to crumble. Maiorescu, the acting Minister of Education and proponent of an unpopular education reform, was perplexed by their decision: "Gane and Pogor should present themselves in Bucharest immediately [Maiorescu's italics]! Are we going to engage in politics or not? Is there any solidarity between those of you in Iași and me?" Their effective abandon contributed to Maiorescu's resignation in January 1876, then to the arrival in power of a PNL ministry, surprisingly headed by the formerly ultra-"White" Epureanu. In late June, as part of a "wave of liberal retributions", Pogor lost his government job, resigning "on the eve of they when they were meeting to have him sacked".

The Junimists were soundly defeated in the subsequent elections of July 1876. Pogor managed to preserve his seat in the new legislature, which voted on Romanian independence during the War of '77. He was thus involved in parliamentary discussions about the thorny issue of antisemitic discrimination favored by the PNL: in early 1878, he was one of the few deputies who questioned the law preventing Romanian Jews from trading in distilled beverages. Alongside Carp, Gane, and Maiorescu, he enlisted as a member of the reserve militia (or Civic Guard) in Iași, thus serving alongside some members of the Free and Independent Faction. Also in 1878, Pogor, who had been voted in as director of the Iași credit union, was elected to the City Council.

These were times of great disorder among the "Whites", who were hard pressed to come up with an answer to the PNL's success. In late 1877, it seemed that the "White" daily, Timpul, put out by Eminescu and Slavici, was about to go under, and Pogor was expected by his colleagues to help financially. Negruzzi was incensed, writing to Eminescu about Pogor's unresponsiveness: "He is not one to rely in for any sort of business. Nothing doing: Pogor is not one to snap out of his immobility and passivity, not for anything in this world." Pogor eventually joined up with the other Junimists in making peace with Catargiu, and in gathering funds for the newspaper—their assembly was the first step toward fusing together the major "White" factions. He agreed to contribute money for Eminescu and Slavici's wages, but asked for a receipt. Explaining his actions to Maiorescu, he noted: "You'd wish that in Romania, where all things float about like leaves on water, only Slavici and Eminescu be spared the sea tides and the waves of foam."

=== Conservative Party man, Buddhist scholar, and Iași Mayor ===
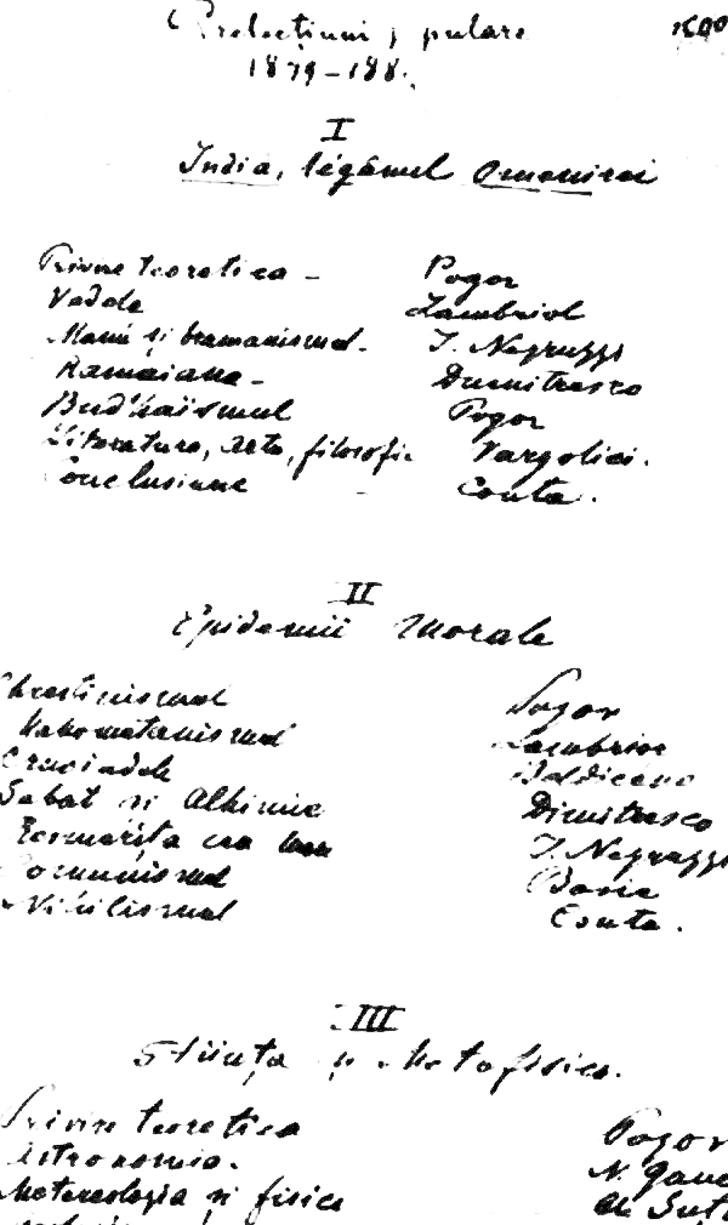
Pogor's handwritten program for the prelecțiuni program of 1879 and 1880. He sets aside for himself lectures on Buddhism (Bud'haïsmul) and Christianity

Pogor was again a prelecțiuni guest in 1875, by which time the younger Junimists (Xenopol, Vasile Burlă etc.) had taken over the task of popular education. Pogor and I. Negruzzi tacitly accepted their supremacy, and, like them, lectured on topics exclusively linked to the concept of national identity. Each speaker was to concentrate on one aspect of historical acculturation, from the Romanian contact with Byzantine Greeks to the reception of German influences, but the schedule was only partly respected. Pursuing his interest in Schopenhauer's work, Pogor discovered the Buddhist worldview. By the early 1880s, his study of Buddhist concepts had become more systematic: he read the scholarly works of Eugène Burnouf, then popularized Buddhist principles in a Convorbiri Literare series (1883–1884). With Maiorescu, and using German intermediaries, Pogor helped Romanians become acquainted with Classical Chinese poetry. While Maiorescu gave his touch to Zhuangzi, Pogor rendered an anonymous (and possibly irretrievable) piece, called "Lover Submitting". In tandem, he looked into Sanskrit literature, translating translations from Amaru.

On February 3, 1880, Pogor was one of 88 "White" spokesmen who signed the founding document of Romania's Conservative Party. The Kingdom of Romania, proclaimed in 1881, was thus effectively ruled by a two-party system. For three non-consecutive terms, Pogor was the Conservative and Junimist Mayor of Iași: February 10, 1880 to April 26, 1881; June 7, 1888 to June 7, 1890; May 30, 1892 to November 11, 1894. He entered history for his creative approach to the Romanianization measures, specifically those which required all shops to have Romanian-language signs. Although this resonated with the Junimist idea of standardizing the language, and even though the Moldavian retailers were on the verge of rebelling, Pogor is said to have had "great fun" dealing with the consequences. He proposed that all shops still carrying non-essential foreign words be taxed at three times the official rate.

Cultural history preserves his dialogue with a Jewish merchant, who told him that Romanian had no assimilated word for "liqueurs"; Pogor spontaneously approximated an equivalent, licheruri (or even its current form, lichioruri). Instead of the French term parfumerie ("perfume retailer"), he suggested parfumeraie or parfumăraie. Chaos followed, and the Romanianization campaign was abandoned. In the end, only one firm was touched the experiment, adopting the willingly absurd title of Șateaucs aucs fleurs—a macaronic rendition of the French Châteaux aux fleurs ("Flower Castles").

Pogor also took care of various other projects, ensuring that the city was compensated by the central government for having lost its status of state capital: 10 million lei entered the city budget (6 of which were compensation from the Romanian state), and 8 neighboring estates were merged into the metropolitan area. He moved the City Hall into Roznovanu Palace, ordering works to begin on the Iași National Theatre, public bathing facilities, ten primary schools, and a new Abattoir. Under Pogor, the streets of Iași were paved with macadam, gas lighting was extended, and sanitation works were started. Casa Pogor was the city's first electrically lit building. His mandates saw the erection of statues honoring the pioneer Moldavian historian Miron Costin (1888) and the Junimist poet Vasile Alecsandri (1890). From 1883, when Eminescu had fallen physically and mentally ill, Pogor also donated to his regular upkeep in a sanitarium.

=== Later assignments ===
Pogor was second after N. Gane on the Catargiu Conservative list at Iași during local elections in January 1883. Soon after, he participated in the rapprochement between the Maiorescu Junimists, who had again divorced the Conservatives, and the moderate core of the PNL. Although Maiorescu himself rejected a ministerial appointment in the Ion Brătianu administration, he and the other self-styled "moderate conservatives" backed Brătianu's practical foreign policy. In February 1884, he promised that Pogor and other disgruntled Conservatives (Menelas Ghermani, Gheorghe Manu, Anastasie Triandafil etc.) would follow him in proclaiming conditional support for Brătianu. Maiorescu thus saved the government from a likely recall, and was embraced by an enthusiastic Brătianu while the Assembly looked on. The Junimist realignment gave the club a permanent representation at the epicenter of Romanian politics. Maiorescu received accolades from the cabinet and, in the November 1884 election, his men received nine seats in the Assembly, negotiated upon with the PNL, and three more for "independent" members; Pogor, Iacob Negruzzi, Ioan Mire Melik and Ioan Ianov were the Junimist deputies from Iași.

As noted by Maiorescu, Pogor was somewhat harder to win over by the PNL's cartel: "Even Pogor, who had favored the reunified opposition, has grown tired of their parties and feels that he should stand with us". The Junimists' ambitions were frustrated by Brătianu only months after the election, when he still refused to include members of the club into his administration. Junimea reverted to independent politics, its conflict with the PNL exacerbated by a personal dispute between Maiorescu and National Liberal politico Eugeniu Stătescu. In December 1887, Pogor became a leading member of the Iași League of Resistance, which also included the former Factionalists such as Alecu D. Holban and Gheorghe Mârzescu. Pogor continued to suggest that Junimea should back the anti-PNL "United Opposition", betting Maiorescu that the latter would be called into power by the monarch. Maiorescu won: in early 1888, after a bloody incident in the Assembly sabotaged all communication between the two main parties, Carol appointed Th. Rosetti as Romanian Premier, and an all-Junimist cabinet was in power for just under a year. At that moment in time, Pogor was more active as a humanitarian—in April 1888, he was elected as caretaker of the Sfântul Spiridon charities.

In September 1888, alongside Dimitrie Ghica-Comănești and Ilariu R. Isvoranu, Pogor negotiated an alliance with the mainline Conservatives, allowing Rosetti to secure his office. In the election of October, he did not rally with the Conservative–Junimist caucus, and joined the dissident Liberals of Dimitrie Brătianu, winning at ballotage for Iași County, Second College. He also continued to be listed as a Junimist, and took another seat in the race for the First College. Rosetti's cabinet was by then supported by the Conservatives, but fell when a Conservative deputy, Nicolae Moret Blaremberg, stirred political conflicts by proposing to indict the PNL's former governing team—such a project was regarded by Rosetti and the Junimists as entirely demagogic. Both Pogor and Maiorescu were also partly responsible for the PNL's return to power: they abstained from voting against the motion of no confidence which toppled Rosetti.

From 1889 to 1890, during the Junimists' reestablishment as an independent party, and again after the 1891 election, Pogor was Vice President of the Assembly. As Panu recalls, he was making a mockery of this assignment: he doodled caricatures of his colleagues, pulled pranks on them "just like in school", and satirized parliamentary procedures with parody statements (such as "the motion has been defeated with a crushing minority"). In the early 1890s, he was firmly committed to the Conservative Party, and served on its Iași committee—alongside Holban, Ianov, A. C. Cuza, Nicolae Culianu, and Petru Th. Missir. Pogor was also drafted into the panel which negotiated an alliance with the Radical Party before the county elections of September 1895, and then into the nomination committee for the general election.

In December 1897, Pogor and his Junimist colleagues again withdrew from the Conservative caucus, only to return before the 1899 county election, in which Pogor and Missir stood as candidates. By November 1900, when the Conservatives and Junimists finally merged into one party, Pogor was again the chairman of the credit union. He also became a member of Iași's Conservative Party steering committee, involving himself in strategy planning ahead of the 1901 general election. Having poorly invested his own sizable fortune, he found himself pestered by his many creditors. One of his biographers, Liviu Papuc, noted that, overall, the first Junimist generation ran into financial trouble, and that Pogor ended his career on an "even score" with life. In 1901, he sold Casa Pogor to socialite Maria Moruzi.

The Junimist co-founder died on March 20, 1906, at his other address—a vineyard in the Iași suburb of Bucium. His reported cause of death was "heart disease"; according to his fellow Conservative Rudolf Șuțu, he "passed on among his family, placid and smiling, as he had lived". He was by then a Commander of the Order of the Star of Romania and a Grand officer of the Order of the Crown of Romania. As reported by the poet-journalist Mihai Codreanu, he had died a "fervent Buddhist" (budist convins), whose final words were: curând voi trece în neant ("soon I shall pass into non-being"). However, he still received an Orthodox funeral service at the Cathedral of Iași, with Metropolitan Partenie Clinceni officiating; his body was then taken for burial in Eternitatea cemetery, where Matei B. Cantacuzino delivered the eulogy. The grave does not bear a cross, but uses a slab of marble marked with his name.

== Work ==
=== Anti-dogmatic Junimism and Parnassian poetry ===
Pogor's anti-dogmatism precluded his engagement on the more serious side of Junimism. When approving of Junimea's name, he staged a fake baptism, asking those present to pledge that they would "renounce pedantry". His philosophical dilettantism was still influential at Junimea: I. Negruzzi recalled that, during the club's sessions, Pogor systematically prevented historians and philologists from reporting on their concrete finds, and only listened to the generic conclusions. As Vianu notes, Pogor himself was virtually incapable of "choosing" between the many subjects that interested him at any one time. It is possible that Pogor is the author of an anonymous poem celebrating his own idleness and contrariness:

Simt o mare fericire de-a sta singur în tăcere,
Deși stricta convenință mă silește-a fi la bal,
Căci sunt leneș de natură și mă legăn cu plăcere
Într-o dulce somnolență pe al visurilor val.

Translation:

I will get my greatest joy sitting here alone and rested,
While that strictest social standard wants me to attend a ball,
For I'm lazy by my nature and will loll down, not invested,
Carried by sweet drowsiness—dreaming as my only goal.

While the caracudă rejoiced, the club's more idealistic visitors were disturbed by Pogor's antics. On these grounds, Pogor fully supported only the most subversive and eccentric manifestations of Junimist literature. He was the only one in the group not to approve of poet laureate Vasile Alecsandri. Although he later helped build the Alecsandri monument, he once shouted out that Alecsandri had "a grocer's taste" in art. Instead, Pogor loved the work of peasant storyteller Ion Creangă, and, to the indignation of some other club members, encouraged him to read aloud from his erotic literature series, "the corrosives". Later, Pogor welcomed in and shed a spotlight on the cynical, streetwise, humorist Ion Luca Caragiale, who was a passing guest at Junimea. According to Șerban Cioculescu, Pogor differed from Eminescu in that he "freely enjoyed [Caragiale's] charming spontaneity and temperamental zigzags." Pogor's nonconformism could target even the group's doyen, Maiorescu. He coined the disparaging nickname Muierescu (from muiere, "broad", in reference to his colleague's alleged sexual misconduct).

His own work in poetry was reviewed with little sympathy by later critics and historians. They dismiss his original pieces as "anodyne" and not up to the test of time, although, as Rudolf Șuțu argues, they too helped engineer a literary language. Pogor was a Romanian Parnassian, reworking classical themes and seeking formal purity, and was especially influenced by Baudelaire and by Théophile Gautier. His verse includes an homage to Melencolia I, the famous engraving by Albrecht Dürer—similarly titled Melancolie. George Călinescu focuses his comments on the poem's atmospheric quality, noting that its "French structure" is exceptional in the Junimist context. The other Junimea bards, he suggests, still favored "accessible" poetry of the Young Germany kind. Beyond the Parnassian poems, Pogor applied his wit (or, as critic Cosmin Ciotloș calls it, "unbelievably malicious spirit") to the realm of parody. His joke poem, Vedenia ("The Apparition"), managed to impress rival Eminescu, who made the effort of transcribing it in his records of Junimea meetings.

Pogor's translation also produced mixed results. Scholar Dan Mănucă believes that the Romanian author found Baudelaire to be "more of a picturesque eccentric and, certainly, not at all a literary innovator"; for this reason, he only looked to Baudelaire's tamer writings, that excluded "scandal". This verdict contrasts earlier pronouncements by critics such as Const. I. Emilian and Perpessicius, who note that the poems' description of female nudity was probably not well received at Junimea, and argue that Pogor effectively prepped Romanians into accepting modernist literature. Pogor's version of Hugo's "Conscience" made a positive impression, and was quoted by Grigore Pletosu in his propaedeutics to philosophy (1899).

Pogor's other projects were often panned by experts. Classicist Nicolae Laslo sees his version of Horatian verse as mostly failed, "with lots of gaucheries and naivetes." The Pogor–Skelitti rendition of Goethe, although verified by the two Junimists through previous French versions (Gérard de Nerval, Henri Blaze), is also considered problematic. Germanist Corina Jiva indicates that they had only a vague understanding of the German words they translated into Romanian. Pogor may have been aware of the shortcomings, since, after Skelitti had died, Convorbiri issued a second version of Faust I. It modified the first edition, especially by rearranging the prose into verse, and only credited one author: Pogor. Scholar Elena Teodorescu Ene sees the result as a fine translation, though she highlights a number of aesthetic issues and grammatical errors; in both volumes, Pogor's version of the Romanian lexis was split between terms invented by the "Latinist current" and "countless" samples of his native Moldavian dialect.

=== Pogor on religion and nationality ===
Vasile Pogor's roots were in Romanian Orthodoxy: his father was ktitor of the Misești Church. Pogor Jr was himself a student of Christian history, but his main focus was on Judaism, the Hebrew Bible, and the Christian Old Testament. He kept detailed notes on the minutiae of biblical lore, making notes about Gog and Magog, the Kinnor, the Purim etc. Albeit fascinated by Jewish and Buddhist practices, the poet was mainly a Freethinker, seen by Vianu as "of a Voltairian and Positivist extraction." The theories of Auguste Comte and positivist language in general were welcomed by Pogor and the other core Junimists even though, as Zigu Ornea notes, the leading exponents of Positivist discourse were secondary Junimists (Nicolae Xenopol, George Panu).

Pogor attacked religion as a lifeless institution, as seen in his poem Magnitudo parri, credited by some as his masterpiece. For Pogor, a swallow's effort to raise its offspring is more worthy of attention than the Byzantine church looming over its nest:

Cântarea păsăruicii e bolta cea divină!
Religiuni, popoare pot a se nimici;
Lipsească chiar credința sub bolta bizantină —
Altarul este-aci!

Translation:

The tiny bird's song is divinity's vault!
Let the people scatter, let religion spill;
Byzantine faith let crumble under the assault —
That altar's in her trill!

Historian Balázs Trencsényi argues that Vasile Pogor, like the other Junimist doyens, engineered "an epistemological break" with the predominating school of Romantic nationalism, as well as with the 18th-century philosophes, introducing instead Positivist and naturalistic approaches to social science. Taking his inspiration from Buckle, Pogor leaned toward environmental determinism as an explanation of historical processes. "Warmer" areas, he claimed, were predisposed to despotism, no matter how advanced there were materially. Trencsényi focuses on Pogor's proposal to separate the material and spiritual growth of a nation, thus contextualizing the Junimist critique of Romania's Westernization: "[Pogor's views] served as a critical perspective to judge societies which reached a certain level of socio-economic modernity without an overall mental adaptation to the Western patterns."

Although not explicitly extended to the Romanian paradigm, Pogor's introduction to Buckle formed an integral part of the Junimist discourse about nation building. As Ornea notes, Pogor struck the typical Junimist note with his critique of revolutionary doctrines, in pronouncements such as: "had politicians not been meddling in to prevent the natural flow of things, progress would have occurred at a quicker pace". Also according to Ornea, the study endures as both a relevant contribution to Junimism and a facet of Romanian philosophy in the 1870s. Trencsényi sees a direct link between the survival of "despotism" in post-modernization, as surveyed by Buckle and Pogor, and the Junimists' rejection of Romania's top-to-bottom Westernization by the liberals. Pogor's vague critique is expanded upon by Th. Rosetti. Rosetti's essays postulate the unrelenting "primitivism" of Romanian society. The liberals stand accused of not having promoted a gradual, "authentic", modernization of Romanian institutions, and of having imposed their "hybrid forms" on the Romanian psyche.

Maiorescu himself suggested that Pogor's Bucklean discovery facilitated Junimism's transformation into a socio-political movement. Other such influences came from Schopenhauer, and from John Stuart Mill's Subjection of Women. Buckle influenced the main Junimist historical narratives, from Maiorescu's historical lectures to A. D. Xenopol's own History of Civilizations. Pogor's own belief, namely that Romania was essentially peripheral to European civilization, was not readily welcomed by the national conservative faction at Junimea. A glimpse of this is provided by a maverick Junimist, George Panu, as a purported clash between Pogor and the autochthonist Eminescu. According to Panu, Pogor openly ridiculed national historians: "What's all this about the history of the Romanians? Can't you see that we have no history? A people which has no literature, art, or past civilization—such a people is not worth the attention of historians... At a time when France could produce Molière and Racine the Romanians were in a state of utter barbarism." Eminescu retorted, promptly and (Panu notes) violently: "What you call barbarism, I call the settled wisdom of a people that develops in conformity with its own genius and shuns any mixing with foreigners" (alternatively translated as: "the wisdom of a nation, which progresses according to the rhythm of its own genius, away from any foreign interference").

Factual or merely symbolic, this showdown has been interpreted by later historians as a good introduction to the conflicting perspectives on Romanian nationhood. In 1997, scholar Lucian Boia suggested: "What we find summarized in these few lines is the great dilemma which has divided Romanian society for the last two centuries." Political scientist Ana Maria Dobre, who connects Pogor's supposed comments with Maiorescu's dismissal of early Romanian history as "oriental barbarism", introduces the Pogor–Eminescu exchange as "a profound dichotomy opposing the defenders of the traditional, specific national values of organization and the supporters of an unconditional modernisation and adaptation to the occidental model in order to depart from a rudimentary type of society."

== Legacy ==
Visual portrayals of Pogor include a sketch by Eugen N. Ghika-Budești, first published in 1895. It shows the Junimist relaxing among lewd devadasis, "leaving behind him the boredom that is the Vice President's chair". A posthumous bust, the work of Iași sculptor Dan Covătaru, was also exhibited in the city. In literature, Eminescu's 1878 parody of the Odyssey, referencing a moment of Junimist crisis, portrays Pogor as "the swineherd Pogoros" (the club's own Eumaeus). Poems about Pogor include one satirical piece by his political rival, Vasile Gheorghian, who built around a pun (pogor as a verb means "I descend"). In addition to his affectionate memoirs, Iacob Negruzzi also made Pogor the subject of an 1872 piece:

Eu sunt eroul straniu cu locuința-n Iași,
De o statură mică, la minte prea poznaș,
Ce planuri urieșe și multe născocește
Dar vecinic din aceste nici unul nu-mplinește.

Translation:

I am that strange hero, and resident of Iași,
A man so small in stature, too impish is his mind,
Who will imagine plans so very grand and lush
Though not for carrying through—not being so inclined.

Pogor's work as poet and theorist was largely forgotten by later generations. This was noted by Junimea anthologist Eugen Lovinescu, who made the conscious effort of reviving the deterministic Parnassian, alongside other "minor Junimists", to evidence "what they still have that's viable." Pogor left one son, Vasile Panopol, a once-famous historiographer of Iași. Born out of wedlock, Panopol had a similar taste for pranks, and belonged to the infamous "black gang" of rebellious aristocrats. While the Pogor book collection was on sale, and divided, soon after its owner died, Casa Pogor survives as a major historical landmark of Iași. After the Moruzi purchase, it became the childhood home of Maria Moruzi's son by Ion I. C. Brătianu, the renowned historian Gheorghe I. Brătianu. The new owners made structural changes, and replaced the Pogor family monograms with Moruzi arms.

In the late 1930s, Brătianu rented Casa Pogor to the Iași's Royal Commissioner, and, during World War II, it was confiscated by Soviet representatives. With the advent of socialist realism in Communist Romania, Pogor and Junimea were stricken out of the literary canon. Writing in 1957, Perpessicius suggested that Pogor's father was a "much more valuable writer". In 1960, Dan Deșliu referred to Pogor Jr as a "nonentity" whose writings reflected "the aesthetic side of the conservative reaction". Two years later, Augustin Z. N. Pop investigated Pogor's indifference and "cynicism" when it came to Eminescu's material ruin. In this context, he spoke of Pogor as "Junimea's sarcastic eminence", with "witticisms as banal as they are foolish." Eminescu's time at Junimea was the main focus of a play by Mircea Ștefănescu, which was performed at the National Theatre Bucharest, under Sică Alexandrescu's direction, in 1964. Ion Caramitru appeared as Eminescu, while Ion Finteșteanu was Maiorescu, and Mihai Fotino was Pogor.

Nationalized during the first communist decades, Pogor's former house was refurbished by the state only after 1968. It was ultimately created a museum in 1972 or 1973, and is a regional center of the Museum of Romanian Literature (MLR) network—supervising other monuments, including, from 1995, the Negruzzi Memorial House of Trifești. The main exhibit hall is mainly known for its Eminescu memorabilia, including the poet's death mask. Its tunnels and its halls have hosted art experiments, including an adaptation of Mircea Eliade's Domnișoara Christina (1999), an introduction to Senegalese music (2006), and a colloquium of the international avant-garde (2008).

During communism, Pogor's grave was tended by a Pogor Literary Circle and the MLR, but had fallen into disrepair immediately after the Romanian Revolution of 1989. Pogor has a following in the Romanian-speaking literary communities of Bessarabia, most of which is now the independent state of Moldova. During the period of Soviet rule in Bessarabia (the Moldavian SSR), references to Romanian cultural assets were usually shunned; this changed in the late 1980s, when Bessarabian cultural magazines were allowed to republish samples of classical Romanian literature. Nistru journal inaugurated the trend in 1988, choosing Pogor as the first contributor to revive. According to Moldovan essayist Maria Șleahtițchi: "Why the magazine's editors should have selected such a minor writer is the stuff of rhetorical questions."
