= Barchiz oil field =

Oil field in Neamț County, Romania

Barchiz
- Country: Romania
- Region: Neamț County
- Offshore/onshore: onshore
- Operator: Europa Oil & Gas

Field history
- Discovery: 2010
- Start of development: 2014
- Start of production: 2015

Production
- Current production of oil: 1,000 barrels per day (~50,000 t/a)
- Estimated oil in place: 12.8 million tonnes (~ 15×10^{6} m^{3} or 94 million bbl)

The Barchiz oil field is an oil field located in Borlești, Neamț County. It was discovered in 2010 and developed by Europa Oil & Gas. The total proven reserves of the Barchiz oil field are around 94 million barrels (12.8 million tonnes), and production will be centered on 1,000 barrels per day (160 m^{3}/d).
