= Nădejde =

Nădejde is a Romanian surname. Notable people with the surname include:

- Camelia Nădejde, pen name of Lucia Mantu (1888 – 1971), Romanian prose writer
- Ioan Nădejde (1854 – 1928, Bucharest), Romanian publicist and translator
- Sofia Nădejde (1856 – 1946), Romanian novelist, playwright, translator, journalist, women's rights activist and socialist
