= Mihai Codreanu =

Romanian poet (1876–1957)

Mihai Codreanu (Romanian pronunciation: [miˈhaj koˈdre̯anu]; July 25, 1876 – October 23, 1957) was a Romanian poet, particularly noted for his sonnets. A native and lifelong resident of Iași, he published his first volume of verse in 1901, followed by another two years later that solidified his reputation. Aside from another book of sonnets in 1914 and two during the 1920s, he authored three highly successful translations of French plays. He also edited a series of newspapers and wrote widely for an array of literary reviews. Attracted to the stage from early on, he led and reformed the main theatre in his city for several years after World War I, and during the 1930s presided over the arts school in Iași. Beginning in 1905, he developed an eye disease that soon left him unable to read or write, tasks that he accomplished through intermediaries.

== Biography ==
=== Origins and education ===
He was born in Iași. His father Mihail Costache Codreanu, a native of Târgu Ocna, was a judge and a Latin teacher at the National College who died of tuberculosis in September 1877. His mother Natalia was born in 1843 to Dimitrie Mânzariu, who later changed the family name to Mârzescu; she worked as an inspector at a maternity hospital. Her brother was Gheorghe Mârzescu, while Mihai's first cousin was Gheorghe Gh. Mârzescu.

He attended secondary school from 1887 to 1894 in Iași, Bacău and Bucharest, and probably moved around schools due to poor conduct. Codreanu's poetic debut came in Lumea ilustrată magazine in 1891. From 1896 to 1900 he studied at the law faculty of the University of Iași, also taking courses in medicine, philosophy and philology. His thesis focused on the patria potestas in Roman and Romanian law. He studied declamation at the Iași Conservatory from 1897 to 1899. In the summer of 1899, after graduation but before receiving his diploma, he attended a theatrical performance by State Dragomir, and began whistling to express his disapproval. An outraged Dragomir demanded punishment; the school's leadership met to discuss its options, and resumed its investigation in autumn. Finally, the Education Ministry decided to withhold his diploma for two years.

=== Poetic debut and rising reputation ===
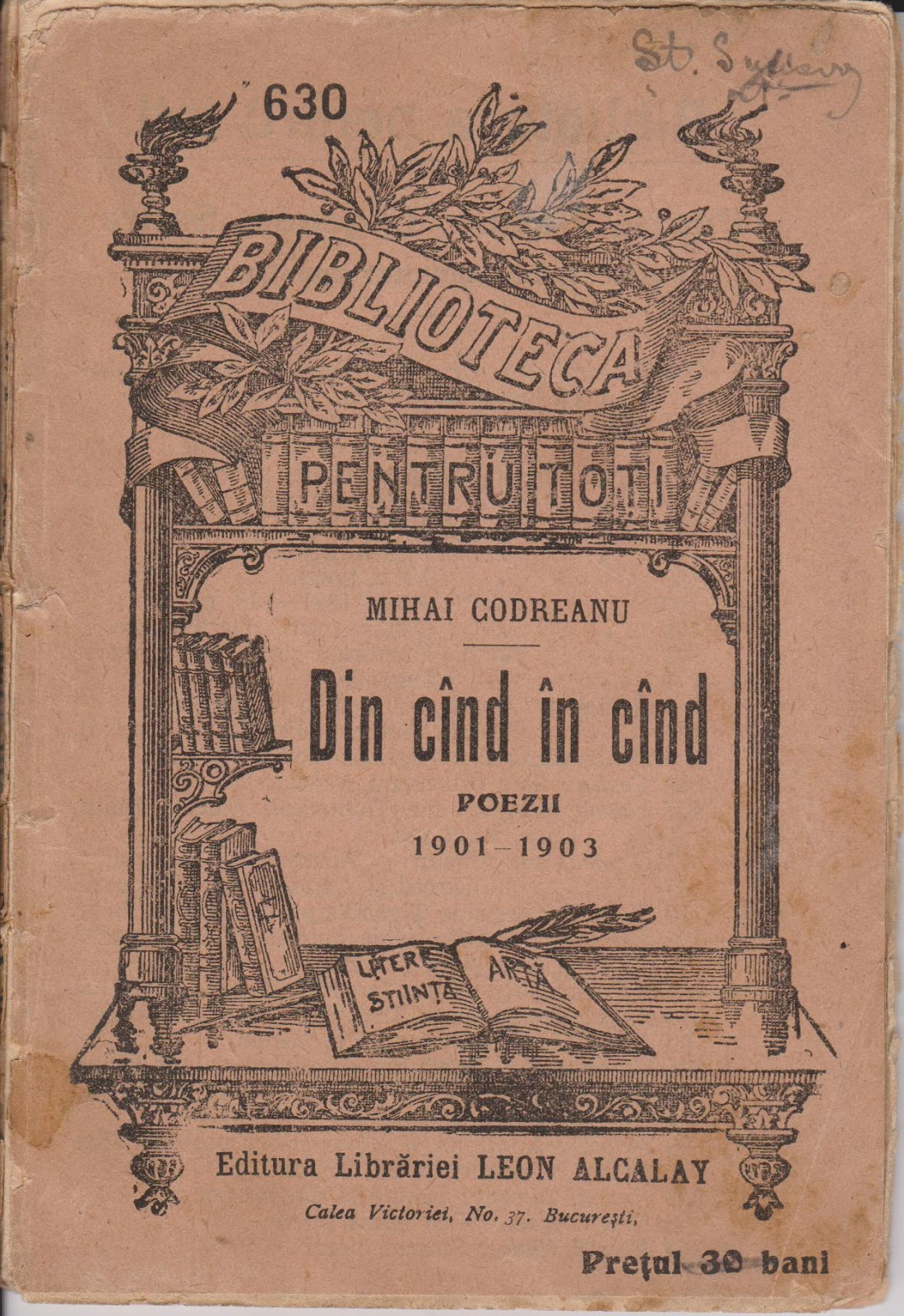
Title page of Din când în când, in the 1905 Bucharest edition

Codreanu took private lessons in dramatic arts with Eugène Silvain at Paris in 1900. While there, he saw a performance of Cyrano de Bergerac and decided to write a translation after receiving written permission from Edmond Rostand. Work on the project went slowly, but he published it in 1920 to great enthusiasm in the cultural milieu; the play premiered in Iași in 1928. Other translations, which sold widely, include Jean Richepin's La Martyre (1901) and Rostand's La Princesse lointaine (1903). Both translations were successfully staged for many years at the Iași National Theatre. In spite of an adolescence spent dreaming of an actor's career, Codreanu's only role on stage came in 1912, when he appeared in his translation of La Martyre.

His first volume of poetry, Diafane ("Diaphanous Forms"), was published in 1901. He convinced Titu Maiorescu to write a preface for the Charles Baudelaire- and Mihail Eminescu-influenced verses. The resultant piece suggested that the young poet drop the imitation of Baudelaire and focus instead on Eminescu's style, which prompted Codreanu to drop the preface entirely. The contemporary press praised his uncluttered style and the classical beauty of his verses.

Din când în când ("From Time to Time") was published in 1903; and when reviewing this work, critics began to regard him as an authentic poet rather than a novice. The volume, initially published at Iași, appeared two years later as part of the prestigious Bucharest-based Biblioteca pentru toți. In 1905, he developed an incurable and hereditary eye disease that prevented him from reading and writing for the rest of his life; the sonnets that form his legacy were thought up and memorized, before he dictated them in final form. He wore dark glasses and often leaned on friends' shoulders when he walked; the disease progressed gradually, so that colors and light slowly disappeared and he was almost entirely blind in old age. He also lost his abundant hair early and took to wearing theatrical wigs. Later, the baldness was somewhat reversed, but as the newer hair was not as rich as the wigs, he invariably appeared in a beret. In 1914, he published Statui ("Statues"), a collection of 99 sonnets, several of which he had composed for the dedication ceremonies of statues in his city. The work was hugely successful, garnering praise from Tudor Arghezi, Eugen Lovinescu and Gala Galaction, as well as from his friends Garabet Ibrăileanu and Octav Botez, although Izabela Sadoveanu-Evan was dismissive.

He edited newspapers in his native city, including Noutatea și Propaganda (1897–1898), Liberalul (1904–1906) and the newly established Mișcarea (1909); not coincidentally, his cousin Mârzescu was director at Liberalul in the same period, and founded Mișcarea. In 1908, he was among the founding members of the Romanian Writers' Society. Magazines that published his work include Viața, Evenimentul, Viața Românească, Flacăra, Convorbiri Literare, Adevărul literar și artistic and Revista Fundațiilor Regale. Viața Românească was especially important in advancing his reputation, and his Statui appeared at its publishing house.

A prolific writer, his articles ranged from filler articles about how to catch rats, to political and literary analyses and reflections on patriotism, education and morals. In 1914, he became a substitute professor at the conservatory, where he taught diction, expressive reading and criticism; he was full professor from 1920 to 1938. His mother died in January 1916. While Iași, where Mârzescu was serving as mayor, would soon become the temporary capital of Romania during World War I, Codreanu's poetry was untouched by the dramatic events taking place around him. Around this period, he lived in a small old apartment in the yard of what is now the Union Museum.

=== Theatre director ===
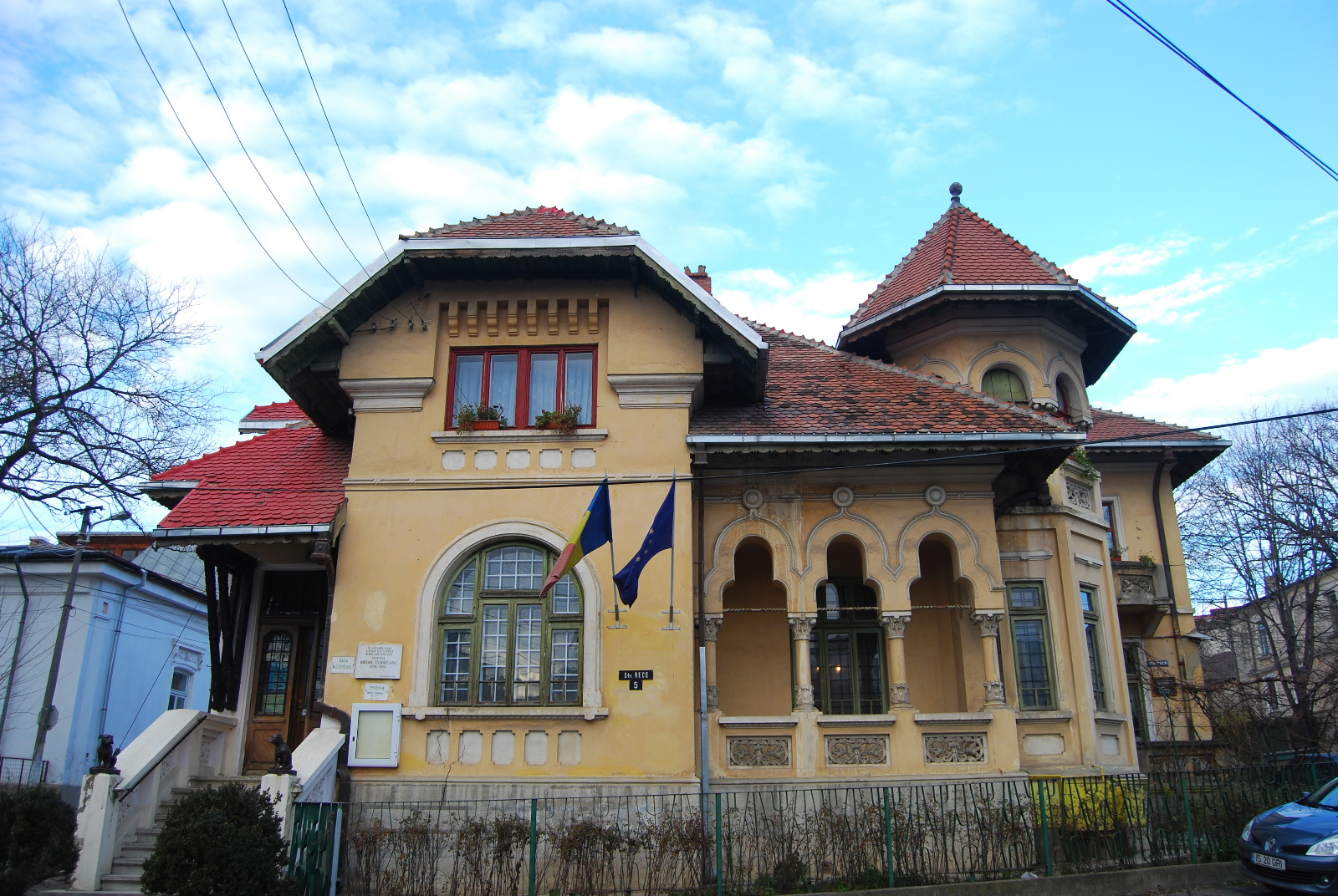
Vila Sonet, Codreanu's home in his later years, and now a museum

From 1919 to 1923, Codreanu headed the Iași National Theatre, taking over from his friend Mihail Sadoveanu. Following the creation of Greater Romania, he saw the theatre's mission as the propagation of a national culture in an enlarged state where part of the population had only tenuous links to the national consciousness. After sending his troupe of actors on an extended tour throughout the Moldavia region, he accepted an invitation from Tiberiu Brediceanu to have the actors perform in Transylvania, newly emerged from Austro-Hungarian rule. They also reached Cernăuți, the capital of formerly Austrian Bukovina, where they helped inaugurate a national theatre.

Additionally, Codreanu reformed the way the theatre operated: instead of having plays rotate after four or five shows, he kept only the best parts of the repertoire and divided the troupe in two (one for comedy and drama, the other for tragedy). In his second year as director, the theatre turned a profit for the first time. As a result, actors and playwrights became much better paid and their professions rose in prestige. He also obtained funds for repairing the building, badly worn out during the war. Codreanu served as general inspector of theatres in 1924, and returned to head the theatre on an interim basis from January to November 1928. Meanwhile, he wrote Cântecul deșertăciunii ("The Song of Vanity", 1921), praised by Ibrăileanu but scorned by Lovinescu. In the event, he went on to become the second winner of an annual national prize for poetry in 1925.

In 1927, Sadoveanu persuaded him and Păstorel Teodoreanu to join the Cantemir Lodge of the Romanian Freemasonry; the three were also linked through membership in the Viața Românească circle. After the review moved to Bucharest, its place in the cultural life of Iași was taken in 1936 by Însemnări ieșene, which he co-directed with Sadoveanu from 1937. His last volume of original sonnets was the 1929 Turnul de fildeș ("The Ivory Tower") and in 1939, he published Statui. Sonete și evadări din sonet ("Statues. Sonnets and Escapes from the Sonnet"), which collected his prior work while adding a few new sonnets. He was the conservatory's acting rector in 1932, and held the post in his own right from 1933 to 1939, once again showing his skills as an administrator.

=== Mature years and legacy ===
In 1942, he was elected a corresponding member of the Romanian Academy, from which he was purged by the new communist regime in 1948. Near the end of his life, he published Sonete ("Sonnets"), a volume of selected sonnets, with the help of Teodoreanu. In the intervening decades since his last original book in 1939, his writing was confined to magazines. His distinctions included: House Order of Hohenzollern, first class (1914); chevalier of the Ordre des Palmes Académiques (1921); the Légion d'Honneur (1929) and the Order of Labor, first class (1956). He died in 1957, and was buried in Eternitatea cemetery.

Codreanu's first marriage, in April 1906, was to Sofia Betina Veker, who also served as secretary and caregiver. She died in 1946, and the 70-year-old widower quickly married Ecaterina Hare, a 35-year-old native of Bravicea in Bessarabia who had worked as his housekeeper since age 19. Arriving illiterate in his home, she managed to complete fourth grade, with a low passing score, in 1940. In addition to caring for her aged husband, she kept his personal objects in their original state after he died. He is rumored to have fathered a love child, but this individual, who became a university professor, denied the story his entire life.

From 1934, until his death, Codreanu lived in a house called Vila Sonet, built on land donated to him the year before by the Iași authorities in recognition of his achievements. (Sadoveanu sold rather than build a house on an adjacent plot he was given, saying he did not wish to live in Codreanu's backyard.) Since 1970, the house has been a museum almost entirely preserved as it was during his lifetime, including his personal library, office, dining room and bedroom. Codreanu walked around with a cane; the one kept in the museum was reportedly used during his Masonic initiation, and conceals a 70-cm blade of Toledo steel that he used to defend himself from drunkards and the jealous husbands of the women who thronged around him. Once, it was stolen while he was with a prostitute in a brothel, but it was later recovered.

== Bibliography ==
- Puterea părintească în dreptul roman și român (doctoral thesis), Iași, 1900
- Diafane, Iași, 1901
- Din când în când. Poezii (1901–1903), Iași, 1903
- Martira (verse drama in five acts), translated from Jean Richepin, Bucharest, 1903
- Prințesa-ndepărtată (verse play in four acts), translated from Edmond Rostand, Bucharest, 1903
- Statui. Sonete, Iași, 1914
- Cyrano de Bergerac (heroic comedy in five verse acts), translated from Edmond Rostand, Iași, 1920
- Cântecul deșertăciunii, Iași, 1921
- Turnul de fildeș, Bucharest, 1929
- Statui. Sonete și evadări din sonet, Bucharest, 1939
- Sonete, Bucharest, 1957
