= Cracu River =

Cracu River may refer to:

- Cracu, a tributary of the Șușița in Gorj County, Romania
- Cracu Tisei River
- Cracul Comarnic River
- Pârâul Cracul Lung
