= Lucia Mantu =

Romanian prose writer (1888–1971)

Lucia Mantu (pen name of Camelia Nădejde; September 22, 1888 – November 1971) was a Romanian prose writer.

Born in Iași, her parents were Gheorghe Nădejde and his wife Ecaterina (née Băncilă); she was a niece of Ioan and Sofia Nădejde, as well as of Octav Băncilă. The couple's second child, she began her education at home under her older brother's supervision, and was privately educated until completing high school in 1907. Although she had shown an inclination toward literature, she entered the natural sciences faculty of Iași University, attracted by prestigious faculty members who included Paul Bujor and Ion Th. Simionescu. She graduated in 1911, and in 1914, she became a science teacher at Oltea Doamna girls' high school in Iași. In 1913, her brother, a combat medic in the Second Balkan War, had accidentally drowned, sending their mother into shock. She henceforth required diligent care, which Camelia took on, precluding a possible university career. In 1916, shortly after Romania entered World War I, her fiancé was sent to the front, where he was killed; she chose to remain celibate afterwards, in spite of her legendary beauty. However, she was briefly involved with writer George Topîrceanu, and was acquainted with Garabet Ibrăileanu and Mihail Sadoveanu.

In March 1944, with Soviet troops rapidly approaching as part of the Uman–Botoșani Offensive of World War II, the school was evacuated, and Nădejde, together with her gravely ill mother, withdrew to the national capital Bucharest. However, due to the bombing of Bucharest, they went to the rural area of Fundeni, remaining until October. At that point, she and her mother moved into the Bucharest home of Camelia's cousin, the widow of Nicolae N. Beldiceanu. They did not return to Iași, as the house there was almost entirely destroyed by bombardments. Until her retirement in 1947, she worked as a proofreader at two publishing houses, work she probably secured through Sadoveanu's help. Her final quarter-century was monotonous: her mother died in 1950, and she would occasionally visit the Sadoveanus, especially in winter, as her home was poorly heated. She derived particular joy when former students passing through the capital would drop by her house. Nădejde died in 1971, and was buried alongside her parents in Eternitatea cemetery.

She made her debut in 1920 in Viața Românească, with sketches titled Pagini răzlețe. Mantu's true identity was a well-kept secret: not even the magazine editors knew who she was until Sadoveanu recognized an anecdote he had told her in one of her submissions. She also wrote for Adevărul literar and Însemnări literare. Her short prose was published as Miniaturi (1923), Umbre chinezești (1930) and Instantanee (1945). Her 1924 novel Cucoana Olimpia appeared in Italian in 1932 as Gente moldava. She translated numerous works from Russian, including ones by Nikolai Gogol, Ivan Turgenev and Ivan Goncharov. In 1923, she was awarded the Romanian Writers' Society prize in 1923. George Călinescu characterized her as being talented in "miniatures, moments, little observations, often delicate," capable of shedding light on "the provincial soul, indiscreet, malicious in its perseverance and hypocrisy". A more generous Mihai Ralea asserted that her "every impression, every phrase is deeply refined, chiseled, reworked not just for maximum effect, but up to the highest expression of perfection".
