= Nechit =

- Location within Romania

Location
- Country: Romania
- Counties: Neamț County
- Villages: Nechit, Borlești, Ruseni

Physical characteristics
- Mouth: Bistrița
  - coordinates: 46°47′59″N 26°33′13″E
  - elevation: 247 m (810 ft)
- Length: 27 km (17 mi)
- Basin size: 106 km^{2} (41 sq mi)

Basin features
- Progression: Bistrița→ Siret→ Danube→ Black Sea

The Nechit is a right tributary of the river Bistrița in Romania. It discharges into the Bistrița in Ruseni. Its length is 27 km (17 mi) and its basin size is 106 km^{2} (41 sq mi).

== Tributaries ==
The following rivers are tributaries to the river Nechit (from source to mouth):

- Left: Mastacăn
- Right: Cracul Comarnic, Borchiz, Alunul, Durașu, Stroe, Hugiu, Varnițele, Coșu and Nechizel
