= Vasile Adamachi =

Philanthropist

- Born: January 1, 1817; Iași
- Died: March 20, 1892 (aged 75); Eternitatea cemetery
- Occupation: civil service

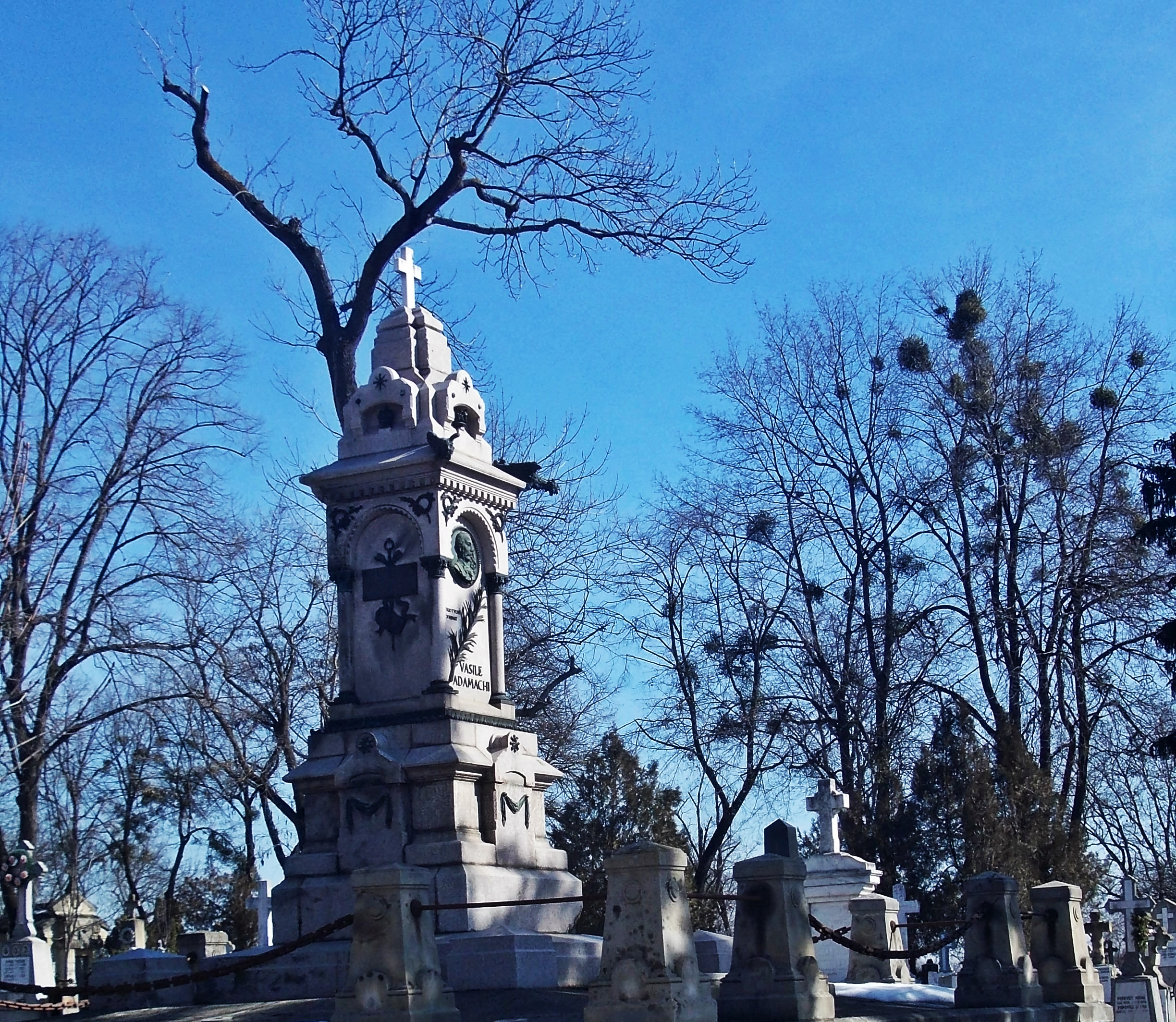
Grave of Vasile Adamachi

Vasile Adamachi (January 1, 1817–March 8, 1892) was a Moldavian-born Romanian philanthropist and man of letters.

Born in Iași, he was descended from boyar families on both sides. His father's first name was originally Adam but became Adamachi under Greek influence, while his surname was Arapu. His mother Eufrosina, the daughter of Constantin Bantaș from Vaslui, came from another old noble family. According to the prevailing custom, Vasile was educated at home and in private schools. He was especially interested in arithmetic and geometry, and learned French and German. In 1835, he was named pomoșnic (sub-prefect's assistant) at the princely council in Iași. In 1836, he was given the honorific title of high clucer. In 1848, he was named comis (Master of the Horse). In 1853, he was made spătar for services to the country as administrator of Vaslui County and president of the Iași eforie (administrative council). Following the adoption of the 1866 Constitution of Romania, a country formed after the intervening Union of the Principalities, Adamachi served two terms in the Romanian Senate.

In 1870, Adamachi donated part of his houses to the city hall for a primary school, holding that primary education was important for raising the condition of the common people. In his will, drafted the month before he died, Adamachi provided for the cultural uplift of the nation. He asked that the income from his fortune of 2.5 million lei be used for two purposes. The first had to do with periodic prizes for those authors distinguished in moral writing. The second was meant for sending and maintaining students of the sciences, so that they might return and improve Romania's factories and industrial output. He left his personal library, encompassing 715 books, plus objects of a scientific character, to Iași University. Most of the books were dictionaries of the classical languages and language instruction manuals. In addition, there were books on astronomy, physics and chemistry; chronicles, poems, pedagogical manuals and medical texts.

Adamachi was buried in Eternitatea cemetery. His grave is listed as a historic monument by Romania's Ministry of Culture and Religious Affairs. His executor was the Romanian Academy, which respected his wishes and carefully administered the fund. Thus, many students from Iași were able to continue their work both at home and abroad.
