= Bălțătești mine =

Salt mine in northern Romania

- Location within Romania

Location
- Location: Bălțătești, Neamț County, Romania; 47°7′0″N 26°18′0″E

Production
- Products: Sodium chloride

Owner
- Company: Salrom

The Bălțătești mine is a large salt mine located in northern Romania in Neamț County, close to Bălțătești. Bălțătești represents one of the largest salt reserves in Romania having estimated reserves of 200 million tonnes of NaCl.
