= Vasile Burlă =

Imperial Austrian-born Romanian philologist

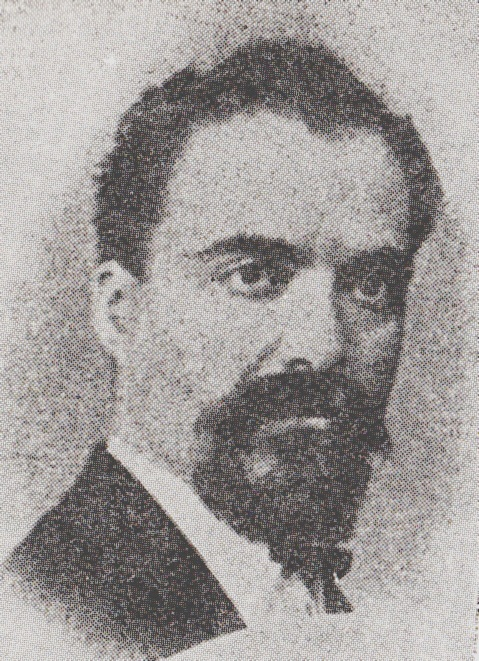
Burlă in 1873

Vasile Burlă (February 9, 1840–January 9, 1905) was an Imperial Austrian-born Romanian philologist.

Born in Opăițeni, a village in the District of Bukovina that today is part of Ukraine, he attended primary school in nearby Storojineț. He then went to the gymnasium in the provincial capital Czernowitz (Cernăuți), taking his degree at Beiuș in Crișana. He attended the universities of Vienna and Graz, graduating in Greek and Latin philology. In 1873, he settled at Iași, in the Romanian Old Kingdom, and was named teacher of Greek and Latin at the National College. He taught at the school for many years, and was director for a period. His students included Nicolae Iorga and Mihail Sadoveanu. In 1925, on the 20th anniversary of his death, his former students dedicated a bronze bust in front of the school. From 1880 to 1890, he taught at a girls' high school, and from 1898 to 1901 taught classics at the Boarding High School. From 1875 to 1876, he was substitute professor at Iași University. Late in life, he was a school inspector. Burlă had to retire in 1901; he died four years later, and was buried at Eternitatea cemetery. His textbooks include Gramatica limbei grecești clasice (1873), Carte de exerciții latine (1888) and Gramatica limbei grecești, prelucrare după Curtius (1895).

Burlă joined Junimea society in 1870; he was considered a leading member and an important collaborator of its magazine, Convorbiri Literare, where he published a number of articles on philology, as well as polemics. Together with Miron Pompiliu and Pavel Paicu, he formed part of a "Latinist" group from Transylvania and Bukovina that had been steeped in the Latin language as the basis of its cultural outlook. He was considered a specialist in the classical languages by his colleagues, and nicknamed the philologist of Junimea. After the departure for Bucharest of society patron Titu Maiorescu, Burlă formed part of a circle (together with Ștefan Vârgolici, Alexandru Dimitrie Xenopol, Alexandru Lambrior and Pompiliu) that met at the home of Iacob Negruzzi in order to simplify the orthographical standards of 1865. Burlă published his articles on linguistics as Studii filologice (1880). He became notorious for a running debate with Junimea rival Bogdan Petriceicu Hasdeu on the etymology of the word rață ("duck").

Burlă married Matilda Cugler in 1872. After the couple divorced, he married Ecaterina Mavrogheni, considerably raising his social and financial standing.
