= Vasile Conta =

Romanian philosopher, poet, and politician

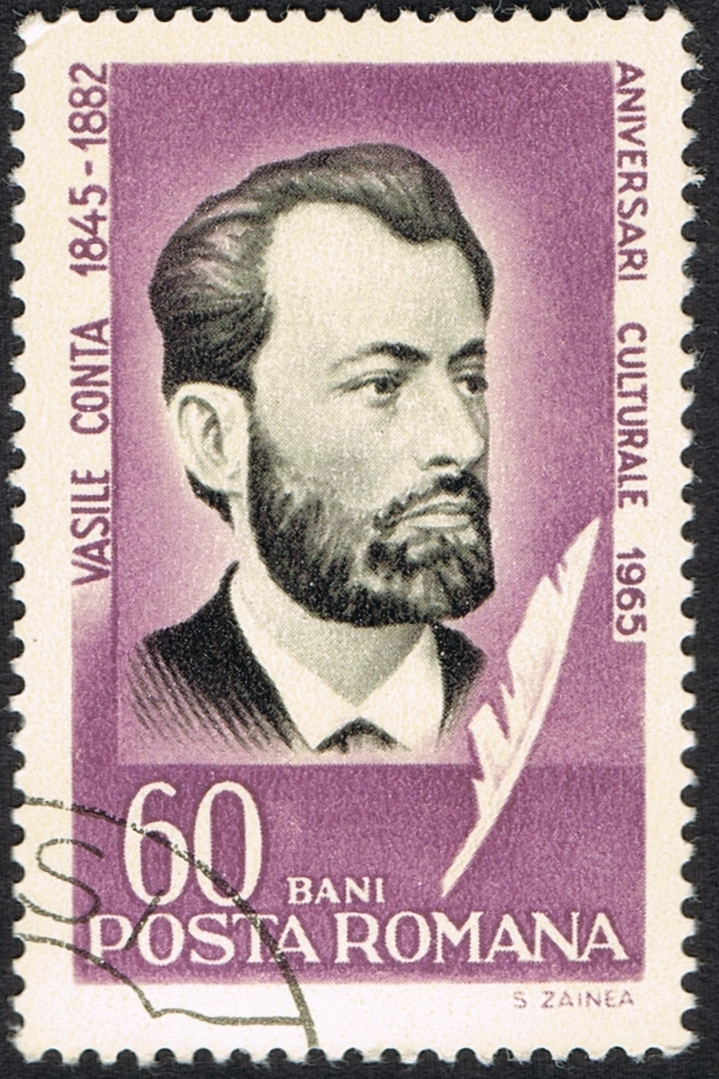
Romanian stamp, Vasile Conta, 1965

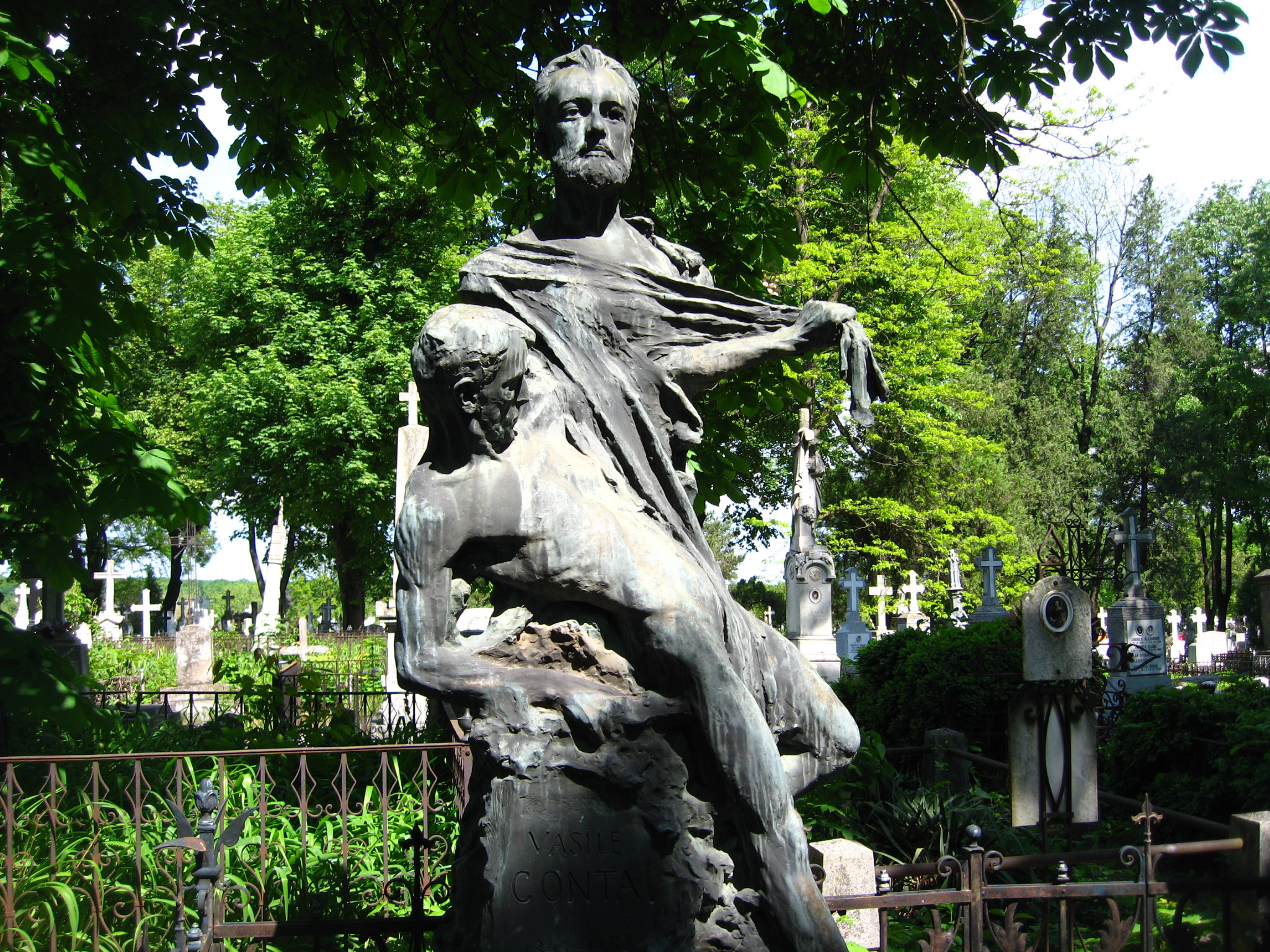
Conta's grave in Iași

Vasile Conta (Romanian pronunciation: [vaˈsile ˈkonta]; Armenian: Վասիլե Գրիգորեիի Կոնտա (Գոնտա); November 15, 1845 – April 21, 1882) was a Romanian philosopher, poet, and politician.

The son of a priest, he was born in Ghindăoani, a village in Bălțătești commune, Neamț County. He attended primary school in Târgu Neamț (where he was a classmate of Ion Creangă), and graduated from the Academia Mihăileană in Iași in 1868. Beneficiary of a fellowship, he went to study in 1871 in Belgium, first in Antwerp, and then at the Free University of Bruxelles, from which he graduated with a law degree in 1872. Upon returning to Romania, he was appointed professor at the University of Iași's Law School. In 1873, he started attending the meetings of the Junimea literary society, where he gave lectures.

In 1877, Conta was elected deputy in the Romanian Parliament, and in 1880 he was briefly Minister of Public Instruction and Religious Affairs in the Ion C. Brătianu government. In 1881, he resigned his faculty position at the University of Iași and was elected a member of the Court of Cassation. On the occasion of the Congress of Berlin in 1878, he took a stand against the seizure by the Russian Empire of the three counties of Southern Bessarabia.

He died in Bucharest and was buried at Eternitatea Cemetery in Iași. A high school in Târgu Neamț, as well as streets in Cluj-Napoca, Craiova, Iași, and Sector 1 of Bucharest are named after him.

== Antisemitism ==
Conta was the true founder of the Romanian ideological antisemitism. His criteria were no longer those of a socioeconomic nature; they were derived from the "nationalities principle," nationalities as units of race and religion, forming the basis of existence of a state and a homogenous nation.
