= Eternitatea cemetery =

Cemetery in Iași, Romania

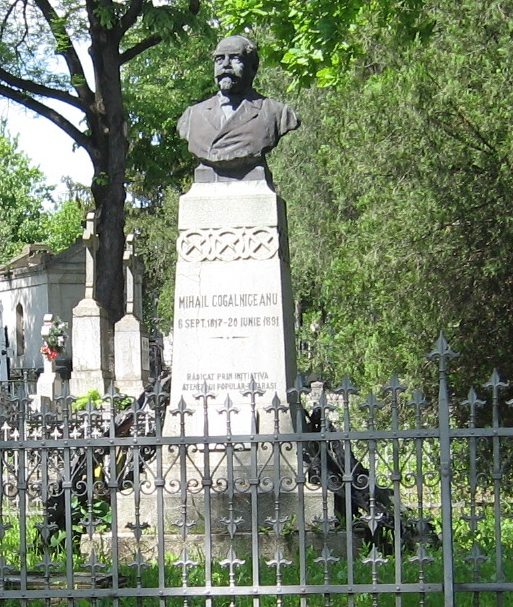
Mihail Kogălniceanu's grave in Eternitatea

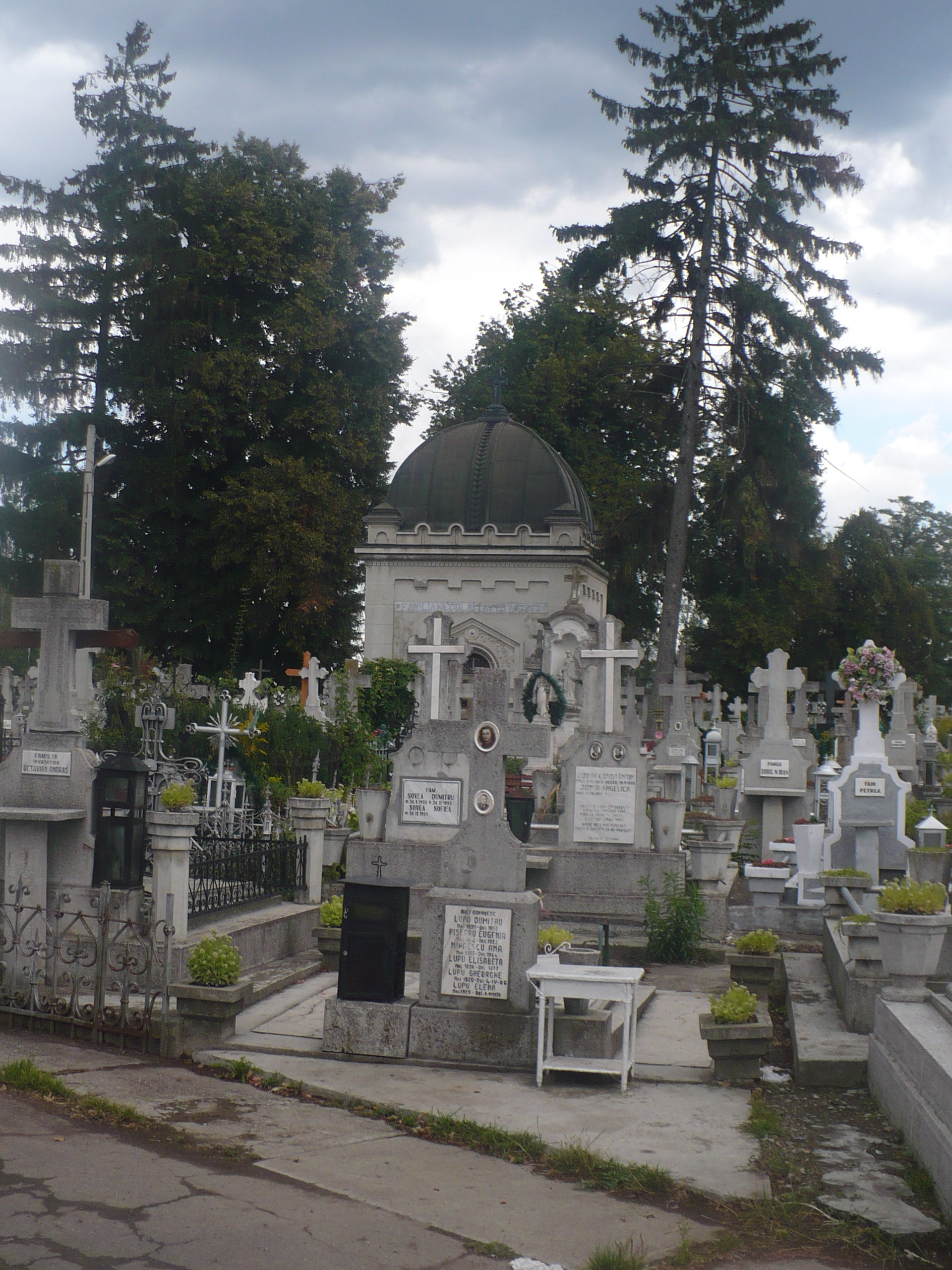
Graves in Eternitatea cemetery

Eternitaté is the biggest cemetery in Iași, Romania. It was classified as a historical monument in 2020.

== Notable interments ==
- Vasile Adamachi, philanthropist
- Călin Alupi, painter
- Petre Andrei, sociologist and politician
- Dimitrie Anghel, poet and writer
- Alexandru Bădărău, politician, academic, and journalist
- Sabin Bălașa, painter, writer and director
- Nicolae Beldiceanu, poet and writer
- Vasile Burlă, philologist
- Maria C. Buțureanu, educator and women's rights activist
- George Matei Cantacuzino, architect
- Eduard Caudella, composer, violinist, conductor, teacher, and music critic
- Otilia Cazimir, writer, poet, translator and publicist
- Mihail Cerchez, general
- Constantin Climescu, mathematician and politician
- Grigore Cobălcescu, geologist and paleontologist
- Mihai Codreanu, poet
- Vasile Conta, philosopher, writer, and minister
- Ana Conta-Kernbach, teacher, writer, and women's rights activist
- Ion Creangă, writer
- Ioan P. Culianu, religious historian, writer, and essayist
- Mircea David, footballer
- Barbu Ștefănescu Delavrancea, writer, orator, lawyer, and mayor of Bucharest
- Nicolae Gane, writer and politician
- Gheorghe Ghibănescu, historian, genealogist, and philologist
- Markus Glaser, Roman Catholic bishop
- Dimitrie Gusti, sociologist, ethnologist, and historian
- Garabet Ibrăileanu, literary critic and writer
- Mihail Kogălniceanu, lawyer, historian, publicist, and Prime Minister of Romania
- Radu Korne, general
- Lucia Mantu, writer
- Gheorghe Gh. Mârzescu, jurist and mayor of Iași
- Dumitru C. Moruzi, cvil servant and writer
- Gavriil Musicescu, composer, musicologist, and conductor
- Vera Myller, mathematician and professor
- Ion Niculi, communist politician
- Marija Obrenović, boyaress
- Alexandru A. Philippide, writer and translator
- Vasile Pogor, politician, publicist and poet
- Petru Poni, chemist, physicist, teacher, mineralogist, and politician
- Ștefan Procopiu, physicist, professor and inventor
- Aristizza Romanescu, actress
- Constantin Simirad, politician
- George Topîrceanu, poet, writer, memoirist, and publicist
- Ștefan Vârgolici, poet, critic, and translator
