= Ghindăoani =

- Commune
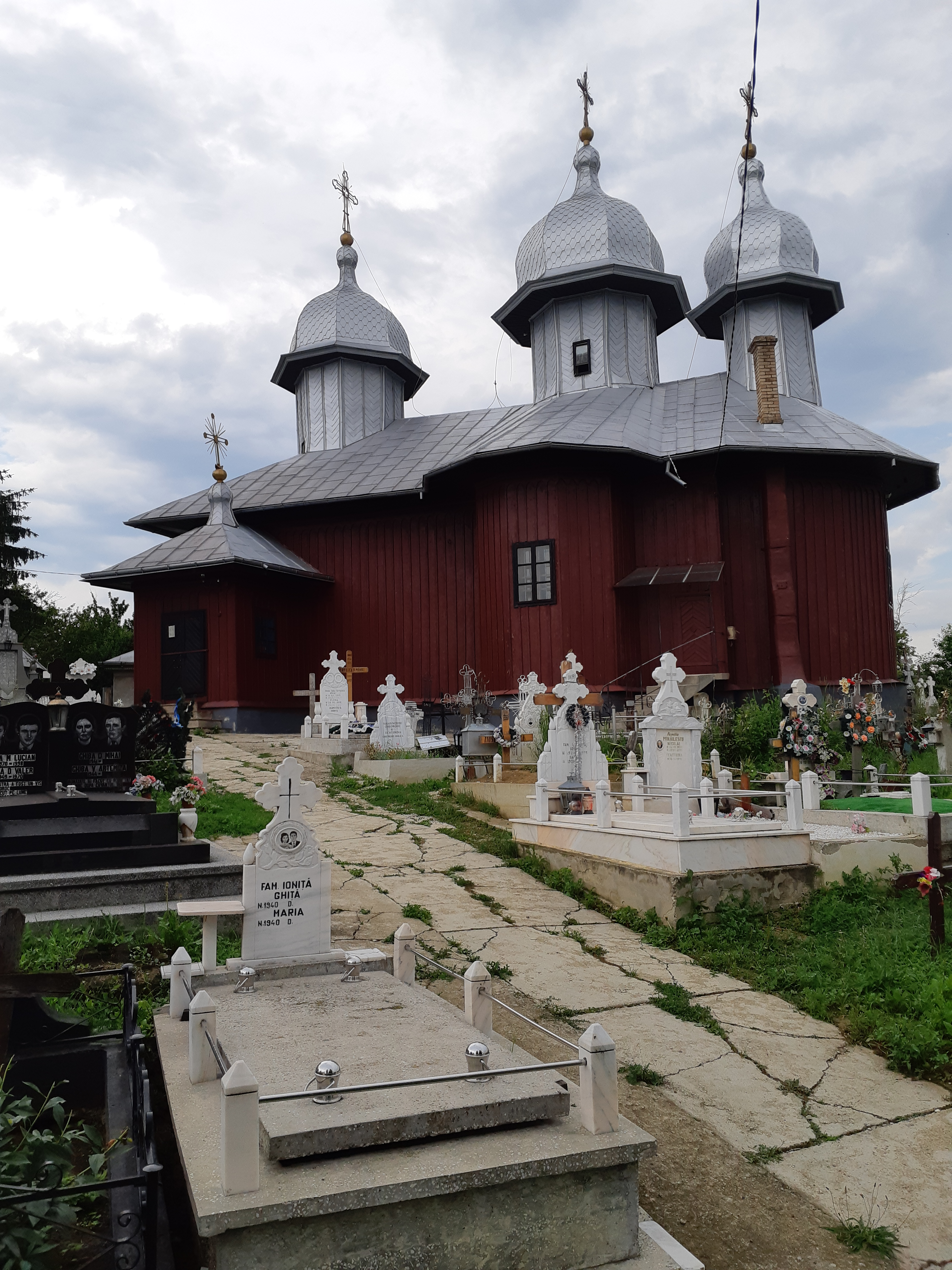
- St. Nicholas Church in Ghindăoani

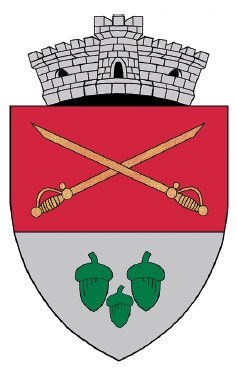
- Coat of arms

- Location in Neamț County

- Location in Romania
- Coordinates: 47°6′N 26°20′E
- Country: Romania
- County: Neamț

Government
  - Mayor (2020–2024): Adrian Antochi (PSD)
- Area: 24.26 km^{2} (9.37 sq mi)
- Elevation: 430 m (1,410 ft)
- Population (2021-12-01): 1,629
  - Density: 67.15/km^{2} (173.9/sq mi)
- Time zone: UTC+02:00 (EET)
  - Summer (DST): UTC+03:00 (EEST)
- Postal code: 617026
- Area code: +(40) 233
- Vehicle reg.: NT
- Website: www.comunaghindaoani.ro

Ghindăoani is a commune in Neamț County, Western Moldavia, Romania. It is composed of a single village, Ghindăoani. This was part of Bălțătești Commune until 2003, when it was split off.

Historical population
Year	Pop.	±%
1992	2,510	—
2002	2,261	−9.9%
2011	1,849	−18.2%
2021	1,629	−11.9%
Source: Census data

== Natives ==
- Vasile Conta (1845–1882), philosopher, poet, and politician
