= Bălțătești =

- Commune
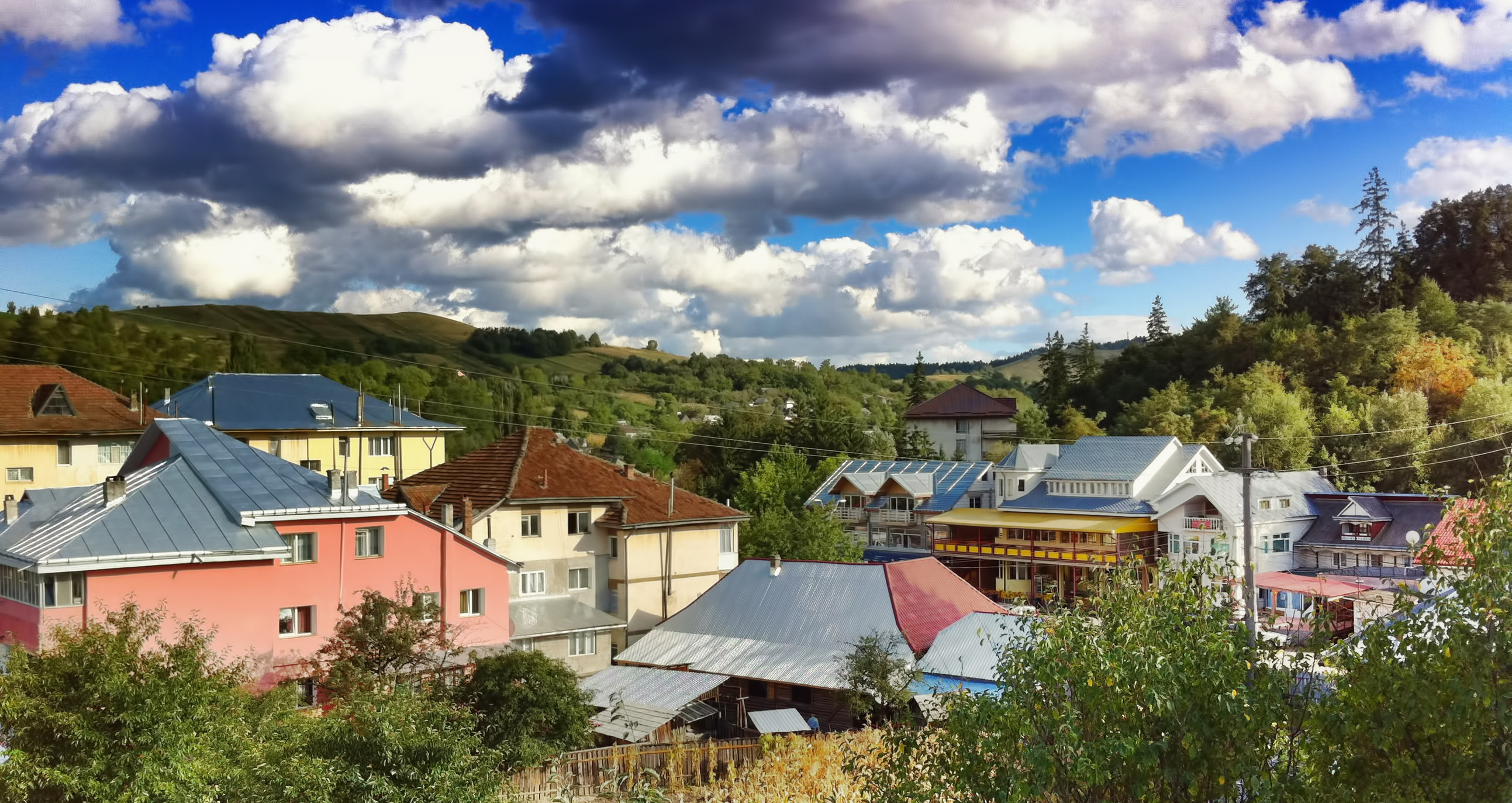

- Location in Neamț County

- Location in Romania
- Coordinates: 47°7′N 26°18′E
- Country: Romania
- County: Neamț

Government
  - Mayor (2024–2028): Ioan-Răducu Radu (PSD)
- Area: 34.7 km^{2} (13.4 sq mi)
- Elevation: 420 m (1,380 ft)
- Highest elevation: 500 m (1,600 ft)
- Population (2021-12-01): 3,565
  - Density: 103/km^{2} (266/sq mi)
- Time zone: UTC+02:00 (EET)
  - Summer (DST): UTC+03:00 (EEST)
- Postal code: 617025
- Area code: +(40) 233
- Vehicle reg.: NT
- Website: primariabaltatesti.ro

Bălțătești is a commune in Neamț County, Western Moldavia, Romania. It is composed of three villages: Bălțătești, Valea Arini, and Valea Seacă. It also included Ghindăoani village until 2003, when it was split off to form Ghindăoani Commune.

The commune is situated 36 km (22 mi) north of the county seat, Piatra Neamț, on the national road DN15C leading to Fălticeni and Suceava.

Bălțătești has several sources of mineral waters used for disease treatment purposes, a hotel and medical facilities. The natural landscape and the surroundings makes it a tourist destination.

The Bălțătești mine is a large salt mine situated on the administrative territory of the commune.

Historical population
Year	Pop.	±%
2002	4,418	—
2011	4,102	−7.2%
2021	3,565	−13.1%
Source: Census data
