= Ștefan Vârgolici =

Romanian poet, critic and translator (1843–1897)

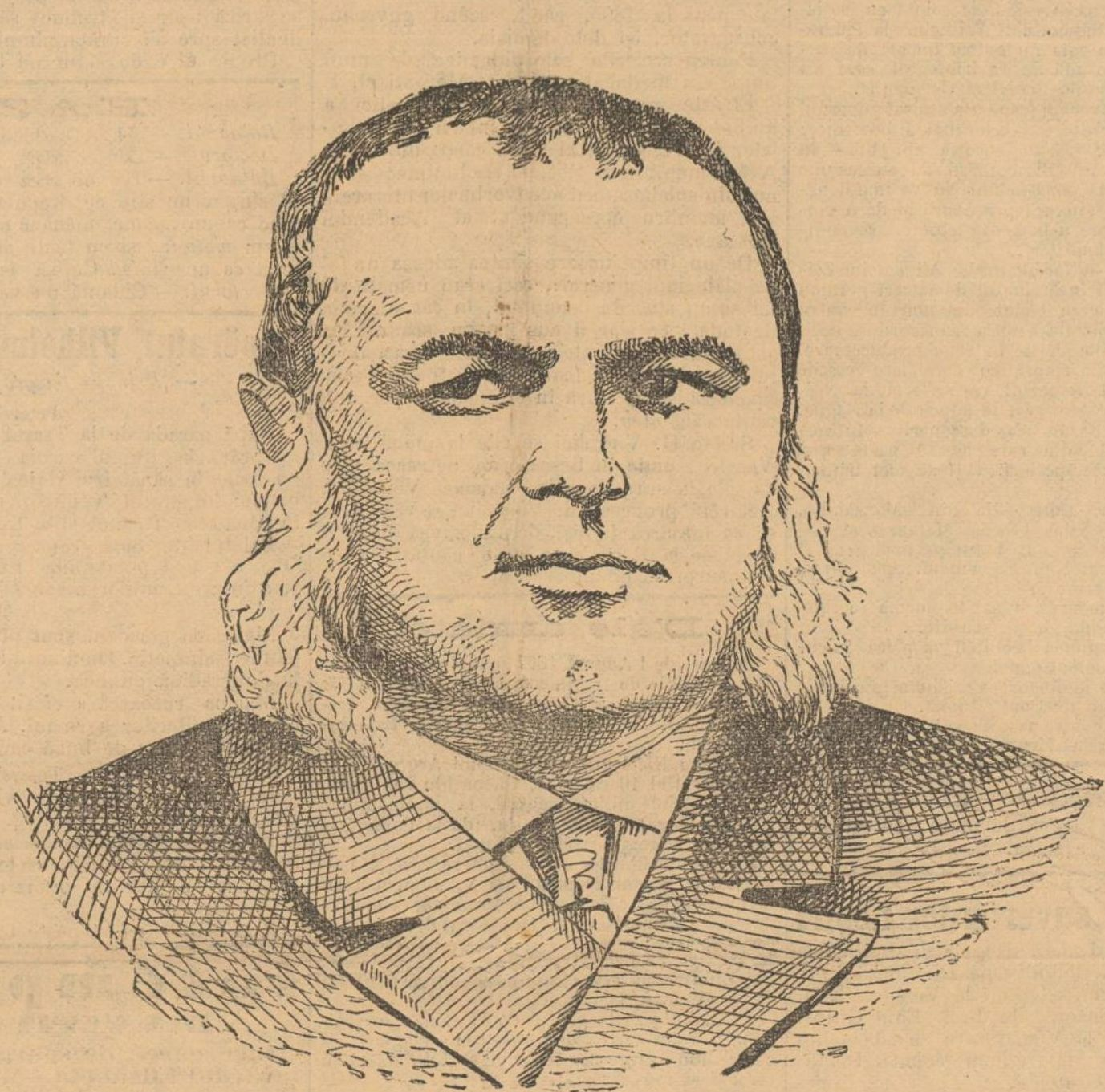
Ștefan G. Vârgolici was also a corresponding member of the Romanian Academy, member of the Junimea cultural association.

Ștefan G. Vârgolici (October 13, 1843–August 9 [O.S. July 28] 1897) was a Moldavian, later Romanian, poet, critic and translator.

Born in Borlești, Neamț County, he attended secondary school at Academia Mihăileană in Iași, followed by the literature and philosophy faculty at the University of Iași. After obtaining a degree in 1864, Vârgolici continued his studies at Madrid, Paris (where he earned a doctorate in literature), and Berlin. Following his return home, he taught high school in Bârlad and Iași. In 1875, he was hired as a professor at the University of Iași's French language and literature department, which later became the department of the history of modern literatures, particularly Romance. For a time, he was inspector-general of secondary education. In 1871, he joined Junimea society and actively participated in its workings, including literary circles, open lectures and publications. In 1887, he was elected a corresponding member of the Romanian Academy. In the summer of 1897, he was on one of his frequent trips to the Văratec Monastery area; he boarded the train with his wife, fell ill near Iași, probably from a heart attack, was taken home and died that evening. Romanian Orthodox bishop Conon Arămescu-Donici officiated at the funeral mass, and he was buried at Eternitatea cemetery.

Vârgolici's first published works were verses that appeared in 1862 in Bogdan Petriceicu Hasdeu's magazine, Din Moldova. He also contributed to Fulgerul și Trompeta Carpaților, but later confined his submissions to the Junimist organ Convorbiri Literare. He published original poems, literary and philological studies, critical articles and numerous translations; these largely remain in the magazines that ran them. His only published book of fiction, the 1873 novella Recrutul, was a translation from Hendrik Conscience. He also wrote a textbook, Gramatica limbei latine, vol. I-II (1875, 1883), and also edited texts such as Aesop's Phaedri Augusti liberti Fabulae. Fabulele lui Fedru sclavul liberat a lui August (1875). He sometimes used the pen names S. Vârgolici, S. G. Vargolici, and St. G. Vârgolici.

Around 1871–1872, Vârgolici was involved with a young widow and the relationship resulted in the birth of a child. Vârgolici prepared to marry her and legitimize their position, but his plans were blocked by the intervention of Junimea colleagues Titu Maiorescu, Iacob Negruzzi. and Vasile Pogor. In 1879, the 36-year-old married Natalia Alcaz, who was 20 and the daughter of a very wealthy Iași resident. In 1888, a year after her death, Vârgolici, by then 45, married Natalia's 25-year-old first cousin Elena Tiron, whose father was a leading member of the National Liberal Party's Iași chapter. In 1899, after Vârgolici's death, his daughter Eugenia married archaeologist Teohari Antonescu. He and Elena had one son, Duțu, who lived seven years; two other sons, Ștefan and Iordachi, died in infancy.
