= George Topîrceanu =

Romanian poet, short story writer, and humourist (1886 - 1937)

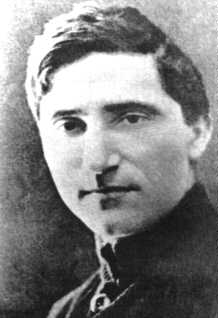
- Born: March 20, 1886; Bucharest, Kingdom of Romania
- Died: May 7, 1937 (aged 51); Iași, Kingdom of Romania
- Resting place: Eternitatea Cemetery, Iași
- Education: Saint Sava High School; University of Bucharest
- Occupations: Poet, short story writer, humourist
- Spouse: Victoria Iuga
- Children: Gheorghe Topîrceanu
- Website: www.georgetoparceanu.ro

George Topîrceanu (Romanian pronunciation: [ˈdʒe̯ordʒe topɨrˈtʃe̯anu]; March 20, 1886 – May 7, 1937) was a Romanian poet, short story writer, and humourist.

== Biography ==
He was born in Bucharest, the son of Ion Topîrceanu, a furrier and his wife, Paraschiva (née Cosma), a carpet weaver. The family lived in the Cotroceni neighborhood. It is said that the origins of the Topîrceanu family are with a family Niștor from the village Topîrcea near Sibiu; there is a family with the name Topîrceanu who claim to be related to the parents of George Topîrceanu, settled in Grădiștea and Periș.

Topîrceanu began his schooling in Bucharest, and then moved to the hilly countryside of Argeș County, in Șuici commune, where he formed his taste for themes taken from nature. After returning to Bucharest, he attended the Matei Basarab High School (1898–1901), and then completed his secondary studies at the Saint Sava High School (1901–1906). Upon graduation, he attended the University of Bucharest Law School, and then its Faculty of Letters, without ever finishing either. This was largely due to a hectic lifestyle, punctuated by numerous affairs and heavy alcohol use.

His debut came in 1905, the year he published his first verses in Sunday papers and minor magazines; in 1909, he managed to have poems featured in major periodicals, such as Sămănătorul. He worked in handcopying, and in 1909 made his mark by having his satirical Răspunsul micilor funcționari ("A Reply from the Minor Civil Servants") in Viața Românească. In 1911, he moved to Iași, on Garabet Ibrăileanu's invitation, and became chief editor at Viața Românească. He later wrote his well-received articles – Cum am devenit moldovean ("How I Became a Moldavia Native") and Cum am devenit ieșean ("How I Became a Iași Native") which trace his meanderings within Romania.

In 1912, he married a young schoolteacher, Victoria Iuga. They had one son, Gheorghe. Although the two were very much in love, the marriage soon began to crumble, due to Topîrceanu's bouts of womanizing and alcoholism. Unable to redeem himself, George nonetheless suffered enormously, and the gradual distancing from Victoria, whom he will repeatedly refer to as his one saving grace, also influenced his literary output.

With the beginning of World War I, Topîrceanu was drafted, then taken prisoner and imprisoned by Bulgarian forces during the Battle of Turtucaia, in September 1916. He was kept in a POW camp until the end of the war, in 1918. After his return, Topîrceanu published several volumes of wartime recollections: Amintiri din luptele de la Turtucaia ("Memories from Battle of Turtucaia", 1918), În ghiara lor... Amintiri din Bulgaria și schițe ușoare ("In Their Claw... Memories from Bulgaria and Light Sketches", 1920), and Pirin-Planina, epizoduri tragice și comice din captivitate ("Pirin-Planina, Tragic and Comical Episodes from Captivity", 1936), which represent, among others, a vivid depiction of the profound effects that the cholera epidemic had on the morale of Romanian troops during their attempted retreat.

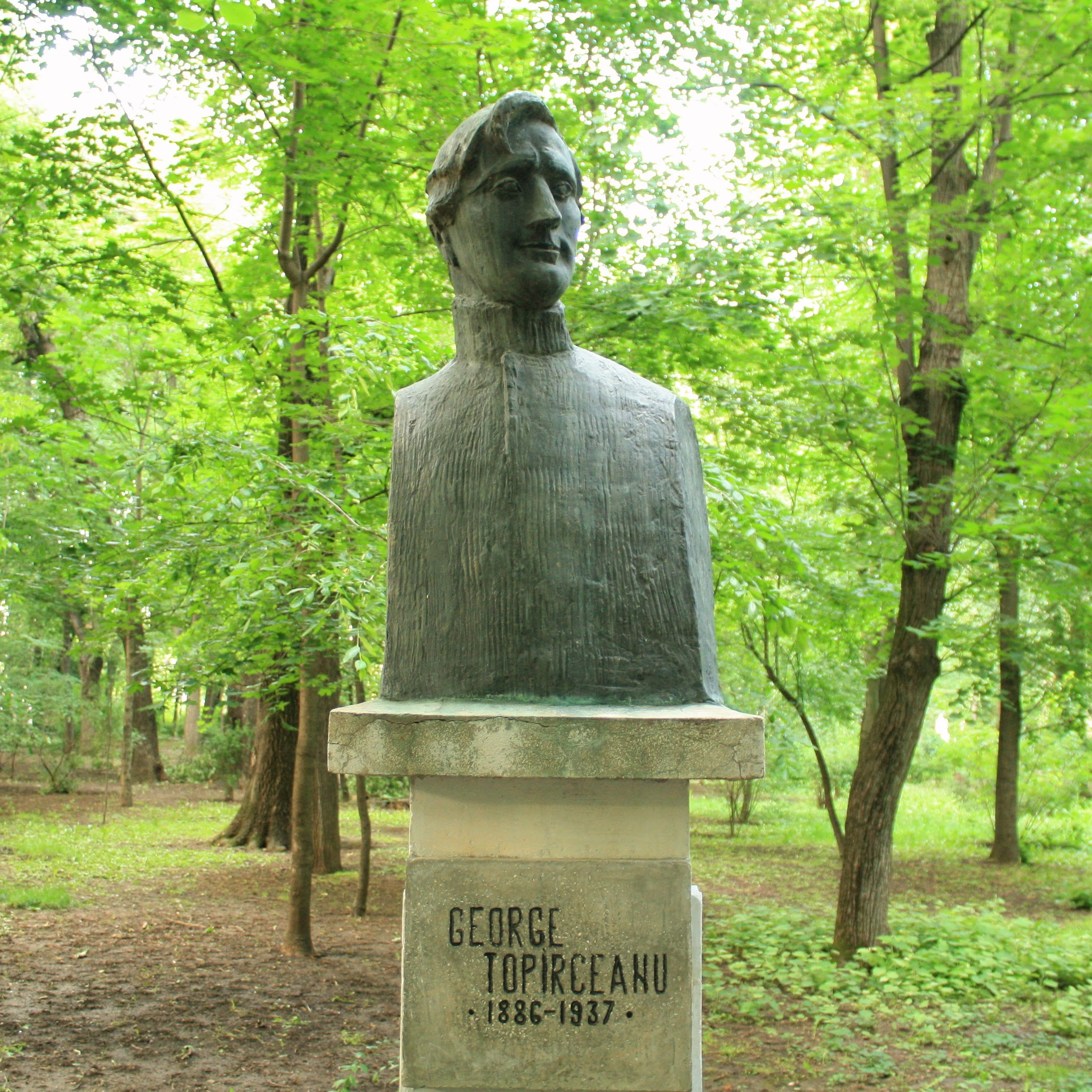
Bust of Topîrceanu in Copou Park, Iași

He began publishing short verses to increasing critical acclaim. In 1926, he was awarded the National Poetry Prize.

Topîrceanu died in Iași in 1937 of liver cancer, and was buried in the city's Eternitatea Cemetery. Streets are named after him in Berceni, Chișinău, Craiova, Hunedoara, Iași, Mediaș, Miroslava, Otopeni, Ploiești, Sibiu, and Suceava. Schools in Bucharest and Mioveni are also named after him.

== Works ==
=== Poetry ===
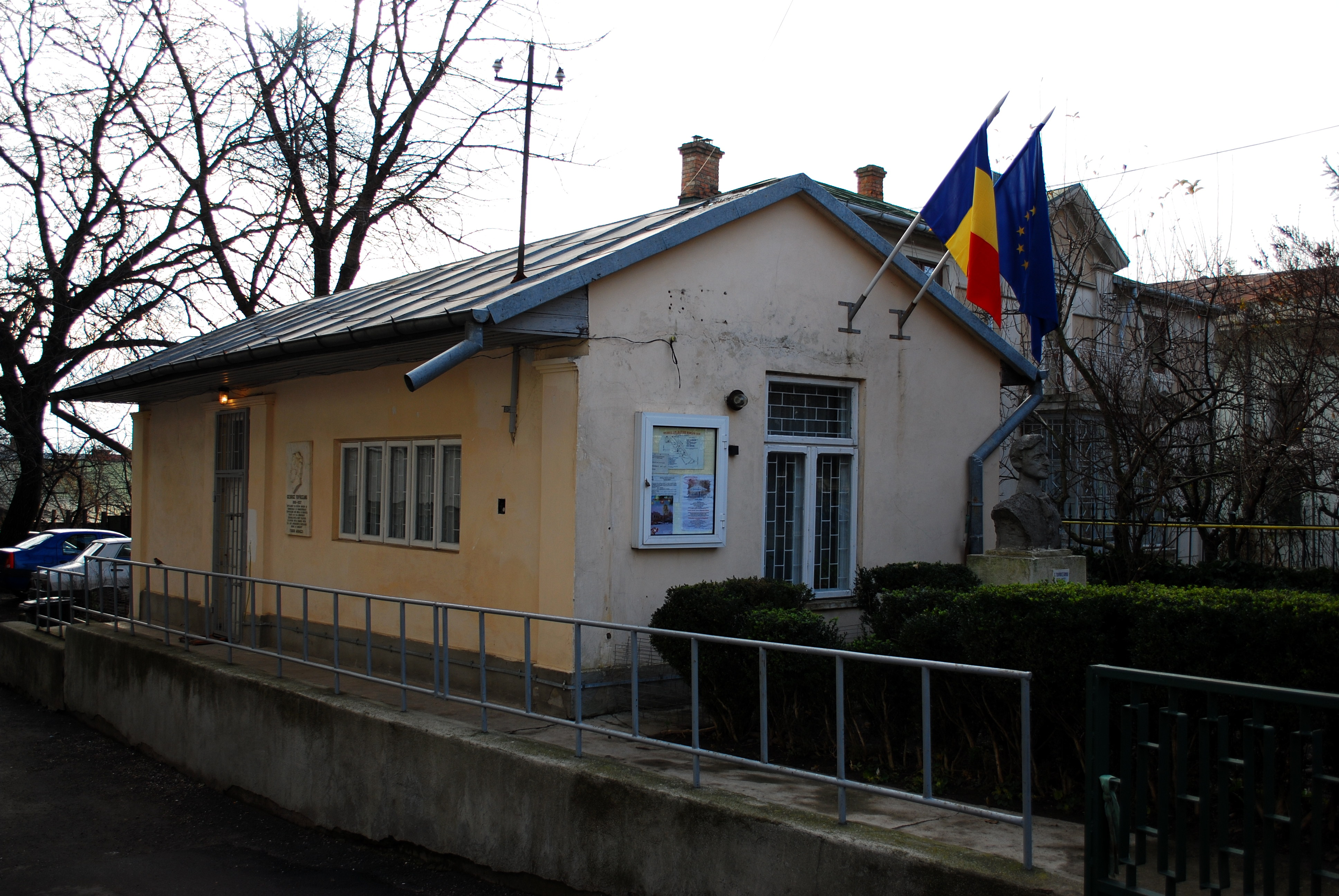
George Topîrceanu Memorial House in Iași

His three main volumes of poetry, Balade vesele şi triste ("Ballads, Merry and Sad"), Parodii originale ("Original Parodies") and Migdale amare ("Bitter Almonds"), are a compelling mixture of humor and delicate lyricism. Topîrceanu's favorite device is to switch, without warning, from biting sarcasm to genuine sentiment and vice versa, often with beguiling ease. In his own words he aimed to: through jest, render tears all too clear.

Topîrceanu's most celebrated pieces, such as Balada unui greier mic ("The Ballad of a Tiny Cricket") and Rapsodii de toamnă ("Fall Rhapsodies") can be enjoyed for their flowing verse, on an infantile level, as well as appreciated for carefully constructed metaphors, incisive humor and contemplative ambiance. Other, more muscular and less lyrical pieces such as Acceleratul ("The Bullet Train") and Cioara ("The Crow"), display his command of the Romanian language, with cascading similes and emphatic rhythms.

=== Prose ===
Topîrceanu wrote many satirical pieces, almost all first published as articles. His prose works were collected in several volumes: Memories from the Battle of Turtucaia (Bucharest, 1918), In their claw... Memories from Bulgaria and Light Sketches (Jassy, 1920), Letters with No Address, Humorous and Pessimistic Prose (Bucharest, 1930), Pirin-Planina, Tragic and Comic Episodes from Captivity (Bucharest, 1936). He also left an unfinished novella, Minunile Sfântului Sisoe ("The Wonders of Saint Sisoe"), published posthumously in 1938.

=== Presence in English language poetry anthologies ===
- Daniel Ioniță (January 2015). Testament: antologie de poezie română modernă [Testament: anthology of modern Romanian verse]. Eva Foster, Rochelle Bews, and Daniel Reynaud (Second edition revised and enlarged (bilingual version English/Romanian) ed.). Bucharest: Editura Minerva. ISBN 978-973-21-1006-5. OCLC 905956966.
