= Gheorghe Gh. Mârzescu =

Romanian politician (1876–1926)

Gheorghe Gh. Mârzescu

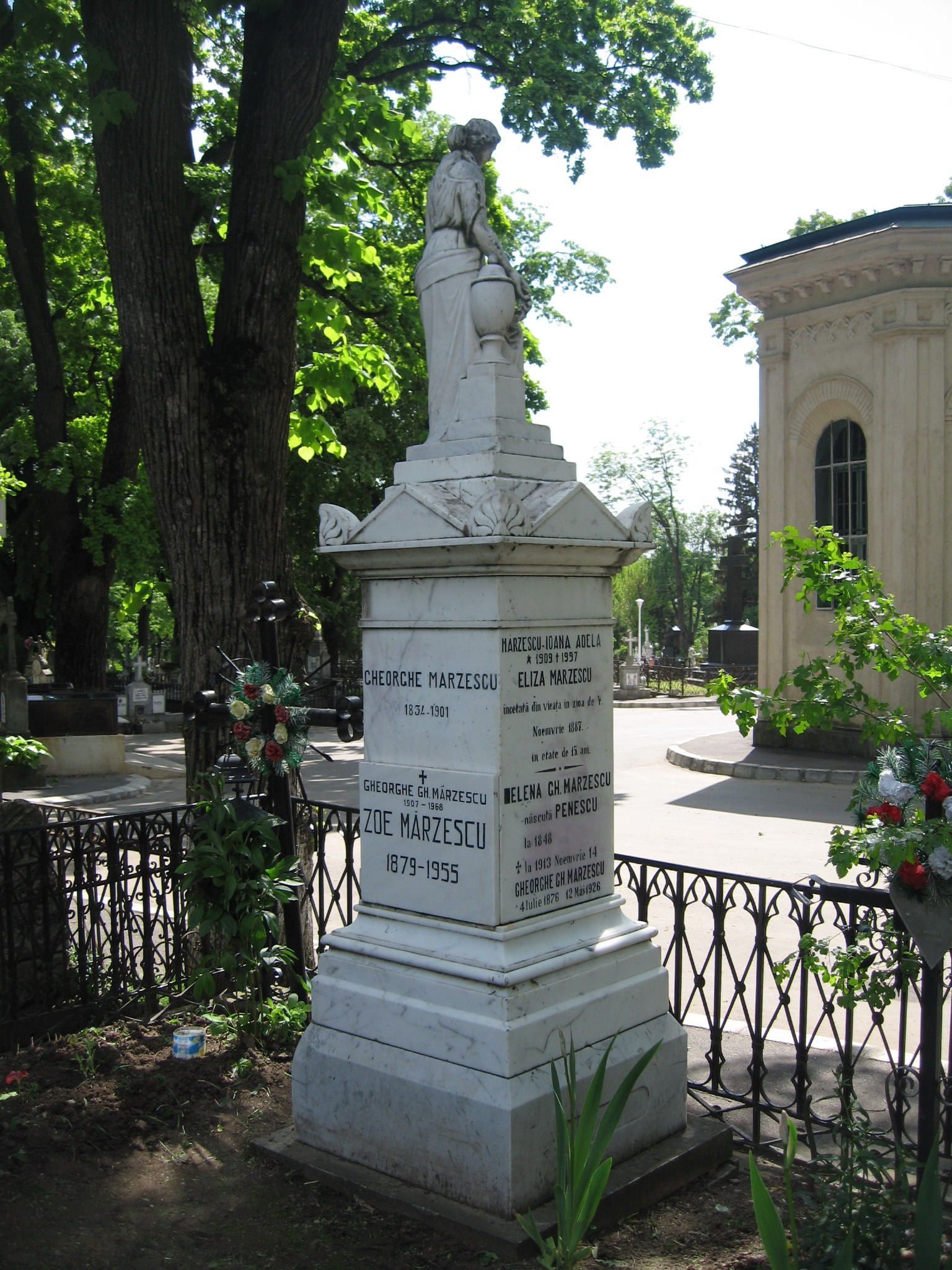
Mârzescu's grave in Iaşi

Gheorghe Gh. Mârzescu (also known as George G. Mârzescu; July 4, 1876 – May 12, 1926) was a Romanian lawyer, journalist and politician. A member of the National Liberal Party (PNL), he was Minister of Agriculture (1916–1918), Interior (1918–1919), Labor and Social Protection (1922–1923) and Justice (1923–1926) in successive cabinets of Ion I. C. Brătianu.

== Biography ==
Descended from a Iași clerical family, his great-grandfather was the Romanian Orthodox archimandrite Gherasim Mârzescu, while his father Gheorghe Mârzescu was a prominent member of the city's liberal circles. He attended high school in his native city, began studying law at the University of Iași, obtained his degree in the field from the University of Bucharest and studied for but did not complete a law doctorate at the University of Paris. In 1896, he worked as chief of staff at the Religious Affairs and Education Ministry headed by his father, and himself entered the PNL in 1901. Between 1901 and 1904, he was administrative director of Sfântul Spiridon Hospital and a substitute professor of civil law at the University of Iași. From 1904 to 1906, he headed the liberal newspaper Liberalul. Elected to the Chamber of Deputies in 1907, he was also named deputy prefect of Iași County. In 1909, he established the political newspaper Mișcarea.

Elected mayor of Iași in 1914, he served for two years. Near the end of his term, Mârzescu had to grapple with the logistical difficulties created by Iași‘s becoming the temporary capital of Romania, an event occasioned by military losses and the fall of Bucharest in World War I. He worked to ensure an adequate food supply and sought to house refugees, whose influx swelled the city’s population to around 400,000. In November 1916, he became vice president of the Chamber of Deputies. From December 1916 to January 1918, he was agriculture minister in the cabinet of Ion I. C. Brătianu, whom he supported consistently. This was a coalition government between the PNL and the Conservative-Democratic Party. Seeing food production as essential to the war effort, he and those around him took special measures: creating agricultural advisers with enhanced powers and county-level military structures; directing agronomists to draw up harvest plans at the commune and county level; ordering the land owned by mobilized troops to be farmed without pay by those left behind; buying up with state funds all excess grain in order to combat speculation; ordering all agricultural laborers, regardless of age or sex, to be requisitioned for farm work.

In November 1918, he was made Interior Minister, serving until the following September. His term coincided with worsening economic conditions that gave rise to social unrest that forces under his command were tasked with controlling. In On December 13, 1918, a typesetters' protest in front of the National Theatre in the capital clashed with Vânători de munte troops, leaving six dead and numerous injured. The government blamed the incident on "Bolshevik elements" inspired by "anarchists in Russia" and "revolutionaries in Pest"; among the socialist leaders arrested was I. C. Frimu. The following month, the government permitted socialist newspapers to publish again and their offices to reopen, while most of those detained were freed.

From 1922 to 1923 he was Labor and Social Protection Minister, and Justice Minister from 1923 to 1926. In that capacity, he pushed through a number of laws; among the subjects these dealt with were acquisition and loss of Romanian citizenship; combating offenses against public order; simplifying legal procedures for speedier trials; reorganizing courts, particularly in the territories acquired at the end of the war; restricting firearm ownership; simplifying procedures for heirs of those killed in action during the war; reforming the High Court of Cassation and Justice; and setting up a Legislative Council—the last two in pursuance of the new 1923 Constitution. The citizenship law allowed for the naturalization of Jews, which made Mârzescu a leading target for assassination by far right activist Corneliu Zelea Codreanu and his allies.

Finally, Mârzescu championed a proposal that became known as the "Mârzescu Law", adopted in February 1924, that banned "extremist" parties and organizations. The law targeted the Romanian Communist Party (PCdR), which was banned that April. It was motivated by an increased activity of the party and its support for self-determination to the point of secession of Bessarabia, Dobruja and Transylvania. The law, which effectively reduced the Communist group to a base of committed activists, was advocated by all the major political forces, ever since the party had publicized its pro-Comintern platform.

He died of a serious illness in 1926 in Bucharest; at the time, he was president of the Iași PNL chapter. He had two daughters and a son, and was buried alongside his father in the Eternitatea cemetery. A primary school in Iași bears his name.
