= Borlești =

- Commune
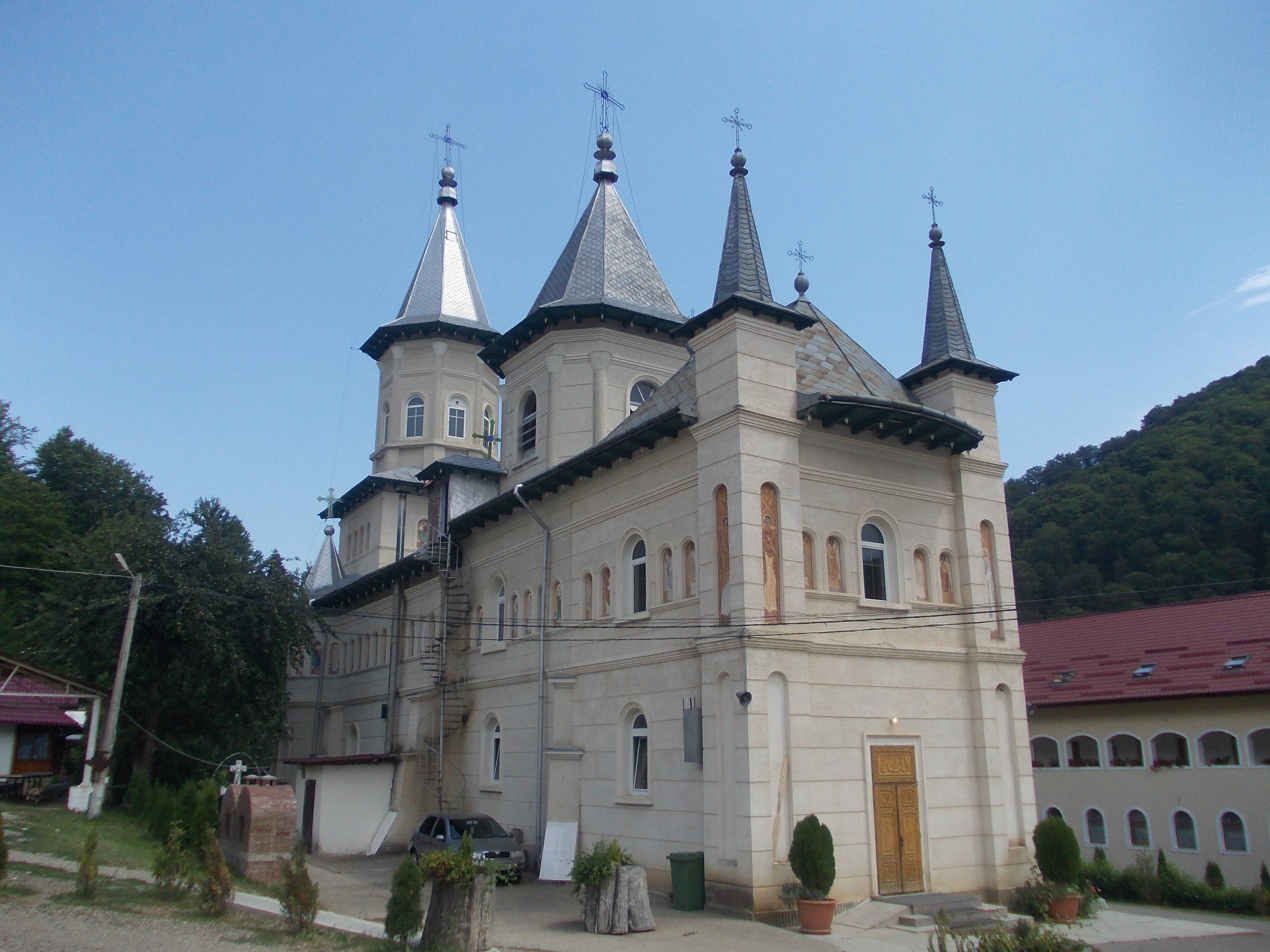
- Nechit Monastery

- Location in Neamț County

- Location in Romania
- Country: Romania
- County: Neamț

Government
  - Mayor (2020–2024): George Mutu (PNL)
- Area: 107.45 km^{2} (41.49 sq mi)
- Elevation: 305 m (1,001 ft)
- Population (2021-12-01): 8,182
  - Density: 76.15/km^{2} (197.2/sq mi)
- Time zone: UTC+02:00 (EET)
  - Summer (DST): UTC+03:00 (EEST)
- Postal code: 617085
- Area code: +(40) 233
- Vehicle reg.: NT
- Website: www.borlesti.ro

Borlești is a commune in Neamț County, Western Moldavia, Romania. It is composed of five villages: Borlești, Nechit, Mastacăn, Ruseni, and Șovoaia.

Nechit Monastery, whose origins date to the beginning of the 14th century, is located in Nechit village.

Historical population
Year	Pop.	±%
1992	9,108	—
2002	9,093	−0.2%
2011	6,938	−23.7%
2021	8,182	+17.9%
Source: Census data

== Natives ==
- Ștefan Vârgolici (1843 – 1897), poet, critic, and translator
