= Gheorghe Mârzescu =

Romanian politician and lawyer

Gheorghe Mârzescu (1834–April 13, 1911) was a Romanian politician and lawyer.

== Biography ==
Born in Iași, he received a law degree from the University of Paris in 1858, and became professor of civil law at Iași University, before transferring to the University of Bucharest in 1896. Initially a supporter of Mihail Kogălniceanu, he remained a liberal, although he frequently clashed with Ion C. Brătianu. He served twice as Religious Affairs Minister (December 1869-April 1870 and November 1896-March 1897). During the latter term, he was part of the Petre S. Aurelian cabinet, and helped ease the conflict provoked by the dismissal of Metropolitan Bishop Ghenadie Petrescu by the Dimitrie A. Sturdza government.

His son was Gheorghe Gh. Mârzescu.
