= Izabela Sadoveanu-Evan =

Romanian literary critic, educationist, opinion journalist, poet and feminist militant

Izabela Sadoveanu-Evan Isabella Sadoveanu, Izabela Morțun, Izabela Sadoveanu-Andrei
- Born: February 24, 1870 probably in Săucești, Bacău County, Romania
- Died: August 6, 1941 (aged 71)
- Occupations: literary critic, journalist, poet, schoolteacher, educationist, activist
- Writing career
- Pen name: I.Z.S.D., Iz. Sd.
- Period: 1890–1939
- Genres: essay, lyric poetry
- Literary movement: Poporanism, Impressionism, Viața Românească

Izabela Sadoveanu-Evan (Romanian pronunciation: [izaˈbela sadoˈve̯anu ˈevan], last name also Sadoveanu-Andrei, first name also Isabella or Izabella; born Izabela Morțun, pen names I.Z.S.D. and Iz. Sd.; February 24, 1870 – August 6, 1941) was a Romanian literary critic, educationist, opinion journalist, poet and feminist militant. She spent her youth advocating socialism, and rallied with left-wing politics for the remainder of her life, primarily as a representative of Poporanist circles and personal friend of culture critic Garabet Ibrăileanu. Under Ibrăileanu's guidance, Sadoveanu wrote for Viața Românească review, where she tried to reconcile ethnic nationalism and traditionalism with aestheticism. As literary critic, she championed the recognition of Symbolism as an independent cultural phenomenon, and reviewed modern developments in English literature.

Sadoveanu represented Romanian feminism at International Alliance of Women congresses, but took a gradualist approach to women's suffrage, and, during the interwar, became interested in creating links between feminism and eugenics. With her activities as schoolteacher and militant, she supported education reform, and qualified to propagate the Montessori method. Late in life, she added feminist anti-fascism to her list of political and social involvements.

The cousin of socialist politico Vasile Morțun, Izabela was the sister-in-law of novelist and political figure Mihail Sadoveanu. She was also related to various families of importance in Romanian political history.

== Biography ==
=== Early life ===
Izabela Morțun hailed from the historical region of Moldavia: her place of birth is given as Săucești, Bacău County, but she may also have been born in Hertsa region. Her parents were Gheorghe Grigore and Eleonora Morțun, uncle and aunt of the socialist Vasile Morțun. By virtue of birth, Izabela was related to several leading Moldavian intellectual and boyar families: her own branch, the Morțunești, was intermarried with the Racovițești, the Movilești and even the ancient House of Bogdan-Mușat. Also among her relatives was the Arbore family, whose members include socialists Zamfir and Ecaterina Arbore.

Izabela was adopted, soon after birth, by the Andrei family, and is reported to have been an unhappy and unwanted child. She had a half-sister, Adela, whom she later described as one of the beauties of Moldavia.

The future author attended primary school in Bacău city, before being sent over to a girls' institute and boarding school in Iași. While enrolled in this French-language institution, also known as Dodun des Perrières School, Izabela Andrei met and befriended Constanța Marino-Moscu, who also grew up to become a writer. It was during those years that Izabela was first drawn into socialist militancy, attending the left-wing cultural circle of Ioan and Sofia Nădejde, and read widely on various subjects. She would become a close friend and collaborator of Sofia, describing her as "beautiful [...], as simple as a child, as full of common sense as if a peasant woman healthy in body and spirit, passionate and excessive, as any real feminine character, in all her manifestations." Acquainted with poet-novelist Nicolae Beldiceanu, she also frequented Beldiceanu's own literary society, meeting with the celebrated raconteur Ion Creangă. Her own debut followed in 1890, when her lyric poetry saw print in Școala Nouă magazine. She was at the time in Bacău city, a substitute teacher at the day school for girls.

In short time, Izabela Morțun made her way to Bucharest, Romania's capital. Still an active socialist, she was present at the 2nd Congress of the Romanian Social Democratic Workers' Party, and met, through her socialist connections, several major figures on the late 19th century Romanian literary scene: Ion Luca Caragiale, Barbu Ștefănescu Delavrancea, Alexandru Vlahuță. Another such figure was the socialist veteran Constantin Dobrogeanu-Gherea, about whom she later wrote: "I never again met a man who could spread as much serenity and reconciliation all around him".

The young woman attended the University of Bucharest Faculty of Philosophy, where she was colleagues with several male writers, including Ioan Alexandru Brătescu-Voinești and O. Carp (Gheorghe Proca). In 1892, Carp married Adela Andrei.

=== Poporanist debut ===
Sadoveanu qualified to be a schoolteacher, and later took up a teaching position in Brăila. In 1898, she married in Roman officer Alexandru Sadoveanu (born 1866), an older brother of the debuting writer Mihail Sadoveanu. She followed him to Focșani, where she taught at the Girls' Boarding School, and eventually to Bucharest, where she worked as an educator for Școala Centrală de Fete.

Over the following decade, like her brother-in-law Mihail, she affiliated with the newly founded Viața Românească, the leading mouthpiece for a Romanian-born leftist-nationalist ideology, Poporanism. She became a disciple of the Poporanist theorist and editor in chief Garabet Ibrăileanu, particularly in what concerns Ibrăileanu's rationalist approach to literary phenomena. She would later describe him as "a handsome young man, famed as being very well-read and cultured, but terrifyingly shy".

Sadoveanu also took Ibrăileanu's side in his polemic with Eugen Lovinescu, a maverick traditionalist and later herald of the modernist scene. Writing to Ibrăileanu in 1909, after having attended one of Lovinescu's earliest public lectures, Sadoveanu described the new arrival as "one great rotter" and "an ignorant", who spoke in a "banal and stupid", "superficial" way. In his 1930s review of Romanian literature, Lovinescu took a reserved view of Sadoveanu's Poporanist activity, suggesting that her nationalist advocacy echoed the right-wing competitors at Sămănătorul magazine, the home of historian and critic Nicolae Iorga, while deeming her critical approach "lyrical, verbose and sectarian."

By 1906, Sadoveanu was also contributing to Revista Idealistă, the Neoclassical magazine of Mihail G. Holban, where she discussed "Romanticism in literature", and the mainstream review Noua Revistă Română. At this junction, she was involved in a minor scandal focused on her brother-in-law and the Poporanist milieu. That year, her old friend Marino-Moscu informed Ibrăileanu that Mariana Vidrașcu, a Viața Românească-serialized novel by Mihail Sadoveanu, was plagiarized from her own manuscript, which she had earlier confided to Izabela, and which Izabela had passed on to her relative; while the Sadoveanus refused to publicize their own version of events, Ibrăileanu assessed the evidence as favorable to Marino-Moscu, and buried the scandal by interrupting the series. Fragments from Sadoveanu's novel were only republished by Manuscriptum review in 1970, and the plagiarism itself was proven in 1988.

During the first decade of the 20th century, Izabela Sadoveanu became one of the socialists who moved closer to the mainstream National Liberal Party (PNL). Her debut as a literary critic came shortly before 1908, when she was briefly a literary columnist for the PNL newspaper Voința Națională.

=== Impresii literare and studies on Symbolism ===
In 1908, Editura Minerva published a volume of Izabela Sadoveanu's critical essays, Impresii literare ("Literary Impressions"). The book earned the attention of critics, and was reviewed in the national press. In Luceafărul, a tribune of the Romanians in Austria-Hungary, fellow writer Ion Duma contrasted Impresii literare with another work of "impressionistic" criticism, that of traditionalist journalist Ilarie Chendi: while Sadoveanu's text demanded didacticism and morality in literature, Chendi, a Sămănătorul dissident, was writing in favor of art for art's sake. As noted by Duma, Sadoveanu's pronouncements defended writers for their moral mission, even to the detriment of art, equally praising Sofia Nădejde and novelist Constantin Sandu-Aldea for their sense of "pity [...] for those less fortunate". The same reviewer also claimed that Sadoveanu, "a womanly character", lacked an understanding of extrovert and "combative" traditionalists like Sandu-Aldea and Luceafărul poet Octavian Goga. Another Luceafărul chronicler, academic Gheorghe Bogdan-Duică, contrarily asserted that Sadoveanu was "rather the warrior", but described Impresii... as inconsistent: "Yes and no; neither here nor there; this, that and the other. And yet it carries a note that ought to be signaled." From his traditionalist standpoint, Bogdan-Duică argued that Sadoveanu erred in reaching beyond "impressions" to consider herself a professional critic, and to advocate the "primacy of the senses" in art: "Ms. Sadoveanu-Evan has a philosophy, even though she is a woman." Reviewing the echoes of Sadoveanu's contributions in 2002, publisher and literary historian Cornelia Ștefănescu argued: "[she] sparked bitter polemics and denials more than appreciations, even though N. Iorga and G. Ibrăileanu, objectively or not, had a privileged view of her".

Sadoveanu alternated the aesthetic ideal with meditations on the national specificity in art. According to literary historian George Călinescu, the volume cemented her transition from socialism to Poporanism, illustrated by quotes such as: "We are Romanians, and our works of art and products of the mind must carry the seal of our nation's originality." A traditionalist, Duma noted with satisfaction that Sadoveanu had parted with socialism to recover "the creed of artistic nationalism": "Everywhere she wishes to point out the Romanian spirit, the Romanian nature: Romanian skies, earth, rivers, woods, birds and insects, a Romanian light." Bogdan-Duică concluded that sensualism did not interfere with the book's didactic agenda, since Sadoveanu still helped popularize writers inspired by "national life", from Mihail Sadoveanu, Carp and Brătescu-Voinești to Ștefan Octavian Iosif and Elena Farago.

Also in 1908, with her Viața Românească articles, Sadoveanu turned her attention to the impact of Symbolism and the anti-traditionalist Romanian Symbolist branch. As she herself argued decades later: "I was the only one to express the opinion that [...] we are dealing with an innovative movement, just like I was the first one in history to sketch out Symbolism in articles for Viața Românească". According to various commentators of her work, cited by literary historian Paul Cernat, she was indeed the first Romanian to take an interest in the movement, and who therefore opened a channel of communication between the Poporanists and the Romanian Symbolists. This assessment is partly contradicted by researcher Angelo Mitchievici, who reviews earlier such essays written by Alexandru Bibescu and Elena Bacaloglu.

Sadoveanu stood out for rejecting the "degeneration" concept introduced, against modern literature, by pathologist Max Nordau. She called Nordau "banal" and "an illusionist", arguing that Symbolism had proven capable of nurturing "poetic geniuses", but, like Nordau, she still looked down on the decadent movement. In her opinion, Symbolism was a worthy counterpart to the "pessimism" of literary naturalism, but a failed one when, as with Stuart Merrill, it veered into the "artificial". Her primary interest was in showing how the anti-positivist poetry of Frenchman Arthur Rimbaud had created a fashion in Romania, but she also discussed the roles that Jean Moréas and Anatole France had in making Symbolism known to a French and international public. Her work also touched on the connection between Romanian Symbolists (Adrian Maniu) and the literary side of Vienna Secession (Rainer Maria Rilke).

Believed by Călinescu to have been "a highly educated woman", Sadoveanu repeatedly argued that professional critics needed to be exceptionally cultured. She reacted against cultural isolationism, describing in detail the merits of reciprocal translation in expanding the written culture. Cornelia Ștefănescu finds her essays characterized by subtlety and the sense of detail, for instance in describing the Romantic critic Charles Augustin Sainte-Beuve, whose proverbial ugliness, Sadoveanu argued, indirectly shaped 19th-century French literature.

=== Geneva studies and feminist beginnings ===
Sadoveanu-Evan was one of four female writers invited to attend the 1909 congress of writers held at the Gheorghe Lazăr High School, which effectively established the Romanian Writers' Society (SSR), a professional association presided upon by Mihail Sadoveanu. She also became noted as a translator of foreign-language works, primarily Italian, into her native Romanian; in 1909, under contract with Minerva, she published a volume of novellas by Grazia Deledda and Giovanni Verga's Royal Tiger.

Beginning 1912, Sadoveanu-Evan furthered her education in Geneva, Switzerland, where she attended the Rousseau Institute and graduated among its first-ever alumni. She returned to take up a headmistress' office at Iași's Pedagogic Institute for Girls, and later at the Elena Cuza School of Bucharest. A supporter of the reading program as the basis for all education, and interested in the applications of the Montessori method, she later created her own Școala de Puericutură și Educatoare (School for Puericulture and Women Educators), and was Inspector of Romanian Kindergartens. Sadoveanu also collaborated with Iorga on the summer school in Vălenii de Munte town.

Although, after Impresii literare, her critical essays were never again collected in book form, Sadoveanu-Evan published several new tracts as an educationist: the 1911 Educația estetică și artistică din ultimele două decenii ("The Aesthetic and Artistic Education during the Last Two Decades") was followed later by Material didactic Montessori ("Montessori Teaching Aid"), Educația nouă. Îndrumări pentru părinți și educatori ("The New Education. Advice for Parents and Educators") etc.

As she recalled in 1939, Sadoveanu began her feminist activism by joining the Sprijinul ("Support") Association of Bucharest. The group, Sadoveanu noted, was more dedicated to "encouraging and aiding women who earn a living through their own labor, rather than to organizing them in view of political life and women's suffrage demands." In fact, Sprijinul grouped together political women (including its president, Smaranda "Ema" Beldiman) and male pro-feminists (the socialist lawyer Toma Dragu). With Mărgărita Miller Verghy, Bucura Dumbravă and other women writers, Sadoveanu was also a founding member of the Româncele Cercetașe Association, an early branch of Romanian Scouting, preceding the Asociația Ghidelor și Ghizilor din România.

=== AECPFR, UFR and IAWSEC ===
In 1918, shortly after World War I had ended, Izabela Sadoveanu was a founding member of Asociația pentru emanciparea civilă și politică a femeilor române (the Association for the Civil and Political Emancipation of Romanian Women, AECPFR), which unified several of the feminist associations in Greater Romania around the ideal of women's suffrage. Through this affiliation, she became a delegate of Romanian women to several international congresses held by the International Alliance of Women for Suffrage and Equal Citizenship (IAWSEC).

After the region of Transylvania, formerly in Austria-Hungary, was united with Romania, Sadoveanu established contacts with its feminist scene. By 1920, she was elected to the Steering Committee of the Transylvanian-based Romanian Women's Union (UFR), assisting its President Maria Baiulescu as one of the UFR's three Vice Presidents for Muntenia (alongside Micaela Catargi and Eugenia de Reuss Ianculescu). She later traced the origin of Romania's organized feminist movement with the UFR's earliest nucleus, created in the 1840s by Maria Nicolau. Her interest in Transylvania also surfaced in her work as a teacher: in the summer months of 1919, she was in Cluj, instructing locals on the practical use of the Montessori method. Her work as a journalist diversified, and she was, before 1924, one of the regular writers in Lamura, a literary review published by Vlahuță.

In September 1925, Sadoveanu was guest speaker at the UFR's 6th Congress in Timișoara, and reported on its proceedings in Iorga's newspaper Neamul Românesc. According to Baiulescu's summary, the Congress explicitly sought to reform the 1923 Constitution of Romania, which had only recognized universal male suffrage, and bring about gender equality as an "act of justice". The report also critically noted a decrease in standing for Romanian women in Transylvania, Bukovina and other regions, ever since Romania had replaced Austria-Hungary as the administrative power. Around that time, Sadoveanu also affiliated with Adela Xenopol's Societatea Scriitoarelor Române (Romanian Women Writers' Society), which stood against the dominant and supposedly sexist SSR; she also began contributing to its tribune, Revista Scriitoarei ("The Woman Writer's Review"), joining a writing staff which also included Sofia Nădejde, Miller Verghy, Constanța Hodoș, Ana Conta-Kernbach, Hortensia Papadat-Bengescu and Aida Vrioni. Sadoveanu was a Vice President of the Society, and took up a similar position in Asociația Universitară, the female Academic Society.

By the mid-1920s, Sadoveanu fell out with Alexandrina Cantacuzino, leader of the National Council of Romanian Women (which was endorsed by the AECPFR). This occurred after Cantacuzino's official visit to Italy, where she had attended an IAWSEC Congress, and where the initiative was taken to create a regional East-Central European feminist association, the "Little Entente" of Women. Sadoveanu was a vocal critic of the project, which, she argued, only served the interest of Czechoslovak women, and accused Cantacuzino of not being patriotic. Historian Roxana Cheșchebec reviews this incident as proof that "the fate of women's activism was related in that period to the promotion of national interests."

Sadoveanu was making herself known as a conservative feminist, earning accolades from male authors who saw political feminism as an "adventure". According to Sadoveanu, feminists, who demanded the suffrage, were to be distinguished from "feminines", who wanted political leverage against the other sex.

=== Other interwar causes ===
By 1927, Sadoveanu was also becoming involved in a major debate about eugenics and feminism, carried out in the pages of Buletin Eugenic și Biopolitic (the mouthpiece of eugenicists active within ASTRA Society). These articles purported that the main cause of feminism was to empower women as homemakers and nurturers, instead of or before granting them political rights and representation. Her collaboration with the Vălenii de Munte institution continued and, together with Iorga and Constanța Evolceanu, she helped organize a preparatory School of National and Moral Female Missionaries (1927). She also lectured there about the implementation of education reform.

Izabela Sadoveanu's preoccupation with early childhood education led her to explore the opportunities offered by radio, a new media at the time: she produced and voiced one of Radio România's first-ever thematic broadcasts, the 1929 Ora Copiilor ("Children's Hour"). Also in 1929, she contributed the preface to an essay by writers R. Catarg and I. C. Chiriacescu, Femeia în epoca nouă a omenirii ("Woman in the New Era of Mankind"). Her tract on Romanian education policies, titled Educația nouă ("The New Education"), saw print the next year.

Sadoveanu and Alexandrina Cantacuzino were reconciled by May 1933, when they were AECPFR delegates to Constanța city, paying homage to the Dobrujan wing of the women's emancipation movement. In later years, Sadoveanu wrote more positively of Cantacuzino, noting her role in propagating the feminist ideal and her participation with the International Council of Women.

Throughout the 1920s and '30s, Sadoveanu-Evan contributed to the left-wing dailies Adevărul and Dimineața (briefly managed by Mihail Sadoveanu), as well as to Adevărul's cultural supplement Adevărul Literar și Artistic. She was originally a columnist for Dimineața, with Pagina femeii ("The Woman's Page"); at the same time, Viața Românească serialized her biographic series Profiluri feminine ("Feminine Profiles"), later taken up by Adevărul Literar și Artistic. The latter also published her April 1928 interview with writer Sylvia Stevenson, on the state of English literature, discussing authors from Virginia Woolf to John Galsworthy (a preoccupation which resurfaced in Sadoveanu's articles as late as 1937). Sadoveanu's work for Adevărul itself originally included a series of her essays on English writers.

Among her other works of literary criticism which saw print with Adevărul Literar și Artistic was a 1930 study of Ibrăileanu's literature, in which she defended her mentor's writing style (proposing that it only seemed "rough" because it sought to be anti-rhetorical). She also alleged that, as a very young man, Ibrăileanu had been in love with her sister Adela (the argument, according to which Adela is the mysterious "Estella" in Ibrăileanu's autobiographical notes, was judged unconvincing by historian Anais Nersesïan). The same paper also published her biographical sketches and recollections about two personal acquaintances from the socialist and Poporanist scene of the fin de siècle: Anton "Tony" Bacalbașa, "Gheorghe din Moldova" Kernbach. She was also contributing to the provincial press: in 1934, her piece "How to Create a Reading Public" ran in the Ploiești paper Gazeta Cărților.

=== Final years ===
After witnessing the impact of fascist movements on Europe's societies, Sadoveanu-Evan combined her feminist stance with the cause of anti-fascism. Together with actress Lucia Sturdza Bulandra, she was active within Frontul Feminin (Feminine Front), an organism designed to defend women's rights against the far right threat, and presided upon by Nădejde. According to researcher Ștefania Mihalache, the Front, which was created in 1936 and soon after published a manifesto, had a Marxist bias, centered on "the woman's right to work". Sadoveanu's made trips abroad, and attended, in Paris, the exhibit marking the 50 years since the Symbolist Manifesto.

During 1937, probably on Sadoveanu-Evan's request, Adevărul began publishing a special second-page column titled Femeile între ele ("Women amongst Themselves"), which included contributions from herself and her colleagues in the feminist movement, Papadat-Bengescu (who may have inspired the column's title) and Nădejde. They were joined by several consecrated or aspiring women writers, among them: Ticu Archip, Lucia Demetrius, Claudia Millian, Sanda Movilă, Profira Sadoveanu (Izabela's niece), Valeria Mitru (future wife of Mihail Sadoveanu), Coca Farago (daughter of poet Elena Farago) and Sorana Țopa (the actress wife of philosopher Mircea Eliade). Izabela Sadoveanu's own pieces for Femeile între ele included an overview of the suffragette movement and a positive report about the Soroptimist International, whose self-help ideas she tried to popularize in Romania, and a sarcastic reply to Archip's strong-voiced antifeminist stance. Also in 1937, Adevărul published her homage to French socialist and pacifist Jean Jaurès, who had fallen victim to nationalists shortly after the outbreak of World War I. A year later, she withdrew from teaching with a state pension, and dedicated her energy to editorial work for Adevărul Literar și Artistic, before the entire Adevărul family of papers were banned by King Carol II's authoritarian regime. In 1939, the Transylvanian left-wing magazine Societatea de Mâine published her short history of Romanian feminist organizations.

== Legacy ==
According to George Călinescu, Izabela Sadoveanu was a prototype of the "cerebral woman" in local letters. She is mentioned, as Sidonia Alexe, in În preajma revoluției ("On the Eve of the Revolution") a 1930s novel and hidden memoir by Constantin Stere, former member of the Viața Românească circle (Mihail Sadoveanu is also a character of the book, hidden under the name Nicolae Pădureanu).

An eponymous monograph on Izabela Sadoveanu-Evanu was published by Editura Didactică și Pedagogică, in 1970; her own work of memoirs, Sufletul altor generații, was included in a 1980 Editura Eminescu anthology, covering mainly the autobiographic texts of folklorist Aristița Avramescu. Twenty years later, critic Margareta Feraru revisited her entire work, republishing two volumes of her magazine essays, as Cărți și idei ("Books and Ideas"). Commenting on this critical edition, Cornelia Ștefănescu made note of Sadoveanu's "daring critical spirit, her unwavering virtues and merits as a researcher, the mobility of her thought over the spheres of ideology, literature, arts and education". In 2007, Paul Cernat wrote that Sadoveanu was "unfairly ignored nowadays".
