= Maria C. Buțureanu =

Romanian educator and women's rights activist

- Born: Maria C. Lambrino; 31 March 1872; Roșcani, Principality of Romania
- Died: 4 December 1919 (aged 47); Iași, Kingdom of Romania
- Resting place: Eternity Cemetery, Iași
- Occupation(s): educator, sociologist, writer
- Years active: 1888–1919
- Notable work: Femeia, 1913
- Spouse: Constantin Buțureanu (m. 1894)
- Children: Vladimir Buțureanu

Maria C. Buțureanu (née Lambrino; 31 March 1872 – 4 December 1919) was a Romanian educator and women's rights activist, who wrote some of the first primary school textbooks and one of the first feminist histories in Romania. After graduating with teaching credentials, she worked in rural schools until 1894, when she returned to Iași and married Constantin Buțureanu. From 1898, she and her husband both taught in Iași for the remainder of their careers. In addition to teaching, they jointly published primary school textbooks while she contributed to newspapers and journals, writing articles in support of education for girls and the need to teach about pacifism.

In 1908, the couple went abroad to further their education and both became involved in the feminist meetings held in Lausanne, Switzerland. They continued to study abroad during the summers of 1910, 1911, and 1912. Buțureanu became a militant feminist, pressing for women's complete emancipation, including the ability for women to be financially independent, have full civil and political rights, as well as full agency over their own bodies and sexuality. She co-founded two women's associations, wrote for their press organs, and served as an organizational chair. She published over a hundred articles about women's rights in popular newspapers and journals and continued to be remembered as one of Romania's prominent feminists of her era.

== Early life and education ==
Maria C. Lambrino was born on 31 March 1872 in Roșcani, a village in Iași County, in the Western Moldavia region. (Note: Marcu and Ilinca gives the year as 1870, but most other sources show 1872.) She studied literature, pedagogy, and sociology in Iași, attending Liceul 'Oltea Doamna' (Oltea Doamna Lyceum), where Ana Conta-Kernbach taught, until 1886. (Note: The school website for Colegiul Național "Mihai Eminescu" states that Lambrino (married name Buțureanu) taught at the school between 1884 and 1886, as do Marcu and Ilinca. She would have been twelve years old, not yet married, and did not graduate until two years later with her teaching credentials.) She then took courses at the Central Pedagogical Institute for Girls in Iași, graduating in 1888.

== Career ==
=== Teaching (1884–1919) ===
Lambrino was hired as a substitute teacher at the Girls' Institute in Târgu Neamț. In 1893, she substituted at the Boys' School Number 2 in Piatra Neamț and in 1894 at the Iași Boys' School Number 5. That year, she married a fellow writer and teacher, Constantin Buțureanu. The following year the couple had a son, Vladimir, who became a noted surgeon and educator. She was hired as a permanent teacher for the Boys' School Number 2 in Piatra Neamț in 1896. From 1898, she and her husband were both transferred to Iași Boys' School Number 5, where they remained throughout their teaching careers.

In 1900, Buțureanu, along with her husband and Valeriu Hulubei, a teacher at Institutul de Arte Grafice Carol Göbl (Carol Göbl Institute of Graphic Arts) wrote a series of primary school textbooks. These were among the first textbooks for schoolchildren published in the country. She wrote numerous articles about education for girls and the need to teach about pacifism. Her last book with her husband, published posthumously, introduced the ideas of the Montessori method of children's education. The couple took a leave of absence between 1908 and 1909 to attend pedagogy courses in Switzerland at the University of Lausanne and the University of Geneva. They also went abroad each summer between 1910 and 1912, studying new teaching methods in Berlin, Brussels, and Venice. Upon her return to Romania, she was appointed in 1913 to serve as a school inspector.

=== Activism (1908–1919) ===
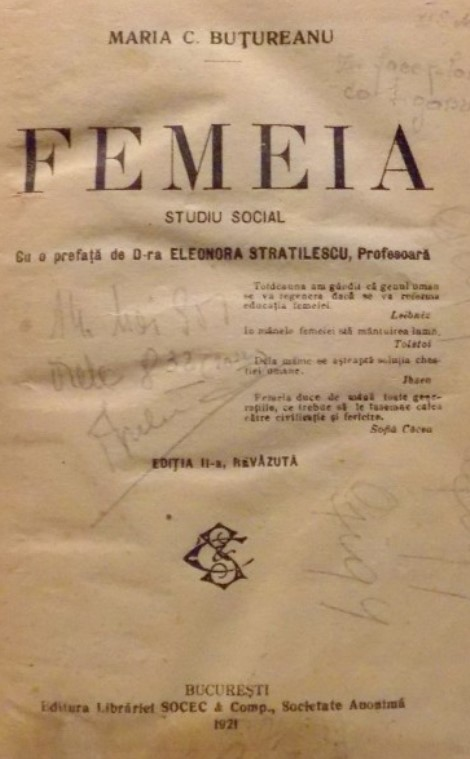
Cover of Maria C. Buțureanu's book Femeia: Studiu Social, 1921 revision

While studying pedagogy in Switzerland, Buțureanu was introduced to feminism. She attended conferences and meetings with her husband, who also supported women's rights. A militant, who adopted an ideology of total emancipation, she declared that "feminism is a question of humanity and civilization, because it concerns the elevation of half of humankind to the highest degree of moral culture". At the time in Romania, women were subject to the 1865 Civil Code, which rendered them legally as dependent children subject to the authority of their father or husband, and if those guardians died, to their brothers or sons. (Note: An update to the Romanian constitution in 1923 grouped women, minors, persons who were mentally challenged, and delinquents among those who were legally unable to act on their own behalf.) She argued that women's financial independence was crucial and that marriage should be abolished to eliminate their dependence on men. She advocated that women become free in all of their activities, including exercising agency over their own bodies and sexuality. She also argued in favor of changing laws to give women full civil and political capacity as individuals.

Along with Emilia Humpel, Aneta Socol, Eleonora and Tereza Stratilescu, Buțureanu founded Asociația Unirea Educatoarelor Române (Union of Romanian Educators Association) and its press organ, Revista unirea femeilor române (Romanian Women's Union Magazine) in 1908. The journal focused on publishing sociological studies of women, and the purpose of the organization initially was to provide technical training for girls to become skilled in home-based industries. They soon branched into wider societal reforms to enable women to participate in all aspects of society. In 1914, the union submitted a list of demands to the constitutional reform assembly, insisting that educated women should have the right to vote and participate in political life.

Buțureanu collaborated with many journals and newspapers, including Evoluția (Evolution), Noua Revistă Română (New Romanian Magazine), Opinia (Opinion), Ordinea (The Order), Renașterea română (Romanian Renaissance), and România Viitoare (Romanian Future). She published over 120 works pressing for higher educational standards and supporting women's rights. Three of these were novels, Răni sufletești (Soul Wounds, 1909), Zări de lumină (Glimpses of Light, 1909), and Vis de mamă (Mother's Dream, n.d.), and each contained feminist themes.

In 1913, Buțureanu published Femeia: Studiu social (Woman: Social Study), one of the first books to chronicle women's history in Romania. It provided a history of the international feminist movement and biographies of Romanian women such as Ralu Caragea, Sofia Cocea, Matilda Cugler-Poni, Elena Cuza, Ana Davila, Dora d'Istria, and Cornelia Emilian. One of the founders of Asociația pentru Emanciparea Civilă și Politică a Femeii Române (Association for the Civil and Political Emancipation of Romanian Women), Buțureanu served as chair from 1917 until her death. She also served as the editor of the association's publication Buletinul Trimestrial (Quarterly Bulletin) in Iași. Other prominent feminists in the association were Calypso Botez, Cornelia Emilian, Elena Meissner, Sofia Nădejde, Ella Negruzzi, and Tereza Stratilescu.

== Death and legacy ==
Buțureanu died in Iași on 4 December 1919, and was buried in the Eternity Cemetery. Her social study of feminism was posthumously revised by Eleonora Stratilescu, with assistance from Constantin based upon notes for revisions made by his wife, and republished as a second edition in 1921. According to historian Ștefania Mihăilescu, it is significant for its sociological contribution on women. Scholars such as Lavinia Ionoaia and Mary Zirin, among others, consider Buțureanu to be one of the most important feminists in Romania during the interwar period.

== Works ==
- Buțureanu, Maria C.; Buțureanu, C. V.; Hulubei, Valeriu (1900). Carte de citire: pentru școlarii de clasa II primară urbană [Reader: For Second Grade Urban Primary School Students] (in Romanian). Bucharest, Romania: Institutul de Arte Grafice Carol Göbl.
- Buțureanu, Maria C.; Buțureanu, C. V.; Hulubei, Valeriu (1900). Carte de citire: pentru școlarii din divizia II rurală, anul al II-lea [Reader: For Second Year Schoolchildren from the Second Rural Division] (in Romanian). Bucharest, Romania: Institutul de Arte Grafice Carol Göbl.
- Buțureanu, Maria C.; Buțureanu, C. V.; Hulubei, Valeriu (1900). Carte de citire: pentru div. III rurală, an. I-II [Reader: For Years 1–2 for the Third Rural Division] (in Romanian). Bucharest, Romania: Institutul de Arte Grafice Carol Göbl.
- Buțureanu, Maria C.; Buțureanu, C. V. (n.d.). Carte de citire: pentru cl. II, III, IV primară [Reader: For 2nd, 3rd, and 4th Primary Classes] (in Romanian). Bucharest, Romania.
- Buțureanu, Maria C.; Buțureanu, C. V. (n.d.). Povățuitorul cărților de citire pentru clasa II, III şi IV primară [Guide to Reading Books for the Second, Third and Fourth Grade of Primary School] (in Romanian). Bucharest, Romania.
- Buțureanu, Maria C. (1913). Femeia: Studiu social [Woman: Social Study] (in Romanian). Iași, Romania: Institutul de arte grafice N. V. Stefăniu.
- Buțureanu, Maria C.; Buțureanu, C. V. (1920). Noul sistem de educație pentru copiii până la 7 ani [The New Education System for Children up to 7 Years Old] (in Romanian). Bucharest, Romania.
