= Mărgărita Miller-Verghy =

Mărgărita (Margareta) Miller-Verghy
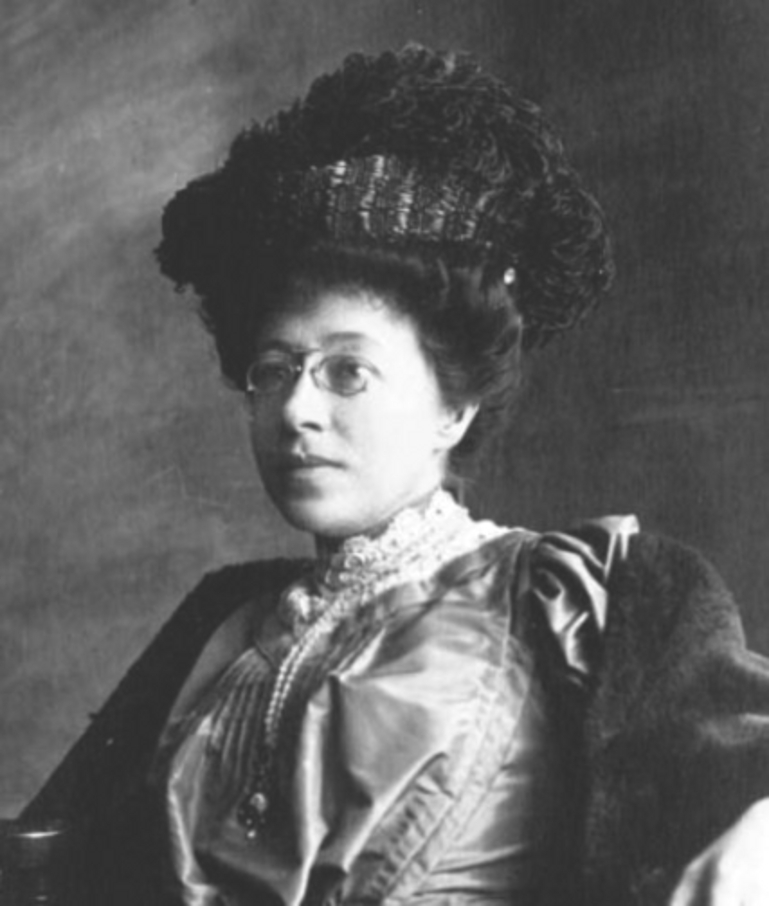
- Miller-Verghy, studio photograph
- Born: January 1, 1865; Iași, United Principalities (now Romania)
- Died: December 31, 1953 (aged 88); Bucharest, Romania
- Occupations: Journalist, critic, translator, schoolteacher, philanthropist, nurse, inventor
- Writing career
- Pen name: Ariel, Dionis, Ilie Cambrea, Ion Pravilă, Mama Lola, Marg. M-V., Marmill
- Period: 1883–1953
- Genres: Children's literature, detective fiction, memoir, novella, radio drama, travel writing
- Literary movement: Neoromanticism, Sămănătorul, Viața Românească

Signature
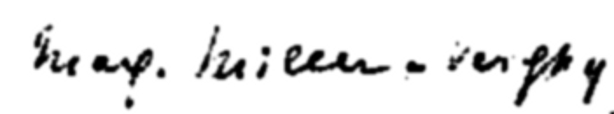

Mărgărita Miller-Verghy (Romanian pronunciation: [mərɡəˈrita ˈmiler ˈverɡi]; first name also Margareta, surname also Miller-Verghi, Miller-Vergy; full name also Marg. M-V.; January 1, 1865 – December 31, 1953) was a Romanian socialite and author, also known as a schoolteacher, journalist, critic and translator. A cultural animator, she hosted a literary club of Germanophile tendencies during the early part of World War I, and was later involved with Adela Xenopol in setting up feminist cultural venues. Her main contributions to Romanian literature include translations from English literature, a history of feminine writing in the national context, a novella series and an influential work of detective fiction. Many of her other works have been described as mediocre and didactic.

Although an accident left her completely blind, Miller-Verghy remained active as both a writer and feminist during the 1920s and '30s. She helped in setting up charity networks, founded some of Romania's first women's associations, and was a pioneer of Romanian Scouting. Around 1940, she was also known for her work in radio drama.

As a socialite, Miller-Verghy was noted for her close relationships with prominent cultural figures of her lifetime. Among them were the acclaimed writers Barbu Ștefănescu Delavrancea, Mateiu Caragiale and Lucia Demetrius, as well as musician Cella Delavrancea.

== Biography ==
=== Early life ===
Born in the city of Iași, Mărgărita Miller-Verghy was of partial Polish-Romanian descent. Her mother, Elena Verghy, belonged to the boyar aristocracy of Moldavia region; her father, Elena's second husband, was a descendant of the Counts Milewski, but used the name Gheorghe Miller. In addition to his teaching career, Gheorghe was politically active, holding a seat in the Senate of Romania. The family was related to that of authors Ionel and Păstorel Teodoreanu, and Mărgărita was also akin to members of the aristocratic Ghica family, being an aunt of socialite Grigore "Grigri" Ghica.

Gheorghe Miller died suddenly in 1869. His widow took the daughters to Switzerland, where young Mărgărita, wrongly diagnosed with Pott disease, was supposed to receive specialized treatment. They spent some eight years abroad, during which time Mărgărita, a gifted but sickly child, acquired a standard classical culture and learned to speak six languages.

The family settled in Bucharest in the 1870s, having by then spent most of their Miller inheritance. Mărgărita enlisted at the in Bucharest. Elena Verghy ran a girls' school, noted for being the first one in Romania to hold Baccalaureate examinations for women (1874), and for employing as teachers some of Romania's literary celebrities. Mărgărita attended her mother's institution, but took her Baccalaureate at Elena Doamna High School, in 1877.

Around that time, Mărgărita's older sister, also named Elena, married Justice Alexandru Lupașcu. The three Miller-Verghys had effectively adopted Ștefănescu Delavrancea, a debutant writer of lowly origins, who later became a hero of the Romanian neoromantic circles. The adolescent Miller-Verghy was especially close to Ștefănescu Delavrancea, with whom she corresponded. He courted her for a while, but ultimately proposed to Mary, the daughter of Alexandru and Elena Lupașcu; they were married in February 1887.

All three women frequented the high end of literary societies, keeping company with V. A. Urechia, August Treboniu Laurian and, allegedly, Edmond de Goncourt. In the 1880s Mărgărita was also acquainted with Mihai Eminescu, later recognized as Romania's national poet. She began her own writing career in 1883, when one of her novellas was published by Națiunea daily, under the signature Marmill. In 1892, she tried her hand at translating into French some of Eminescu's works, as possibly the first-ever person to have published such poetry translations. There resulted a volume in her translation, Quelques poésies de Michaïl Eminesco ("Some of Mihai Eminescu's Poems"). Its first draft was published in Geneva in 1901. Prefaced by poet Alexandru Vlahuță, it was rated a "remarkable" contribution by the staff of Familia magazine.

=== University student and teacher at Elena Doamna ===
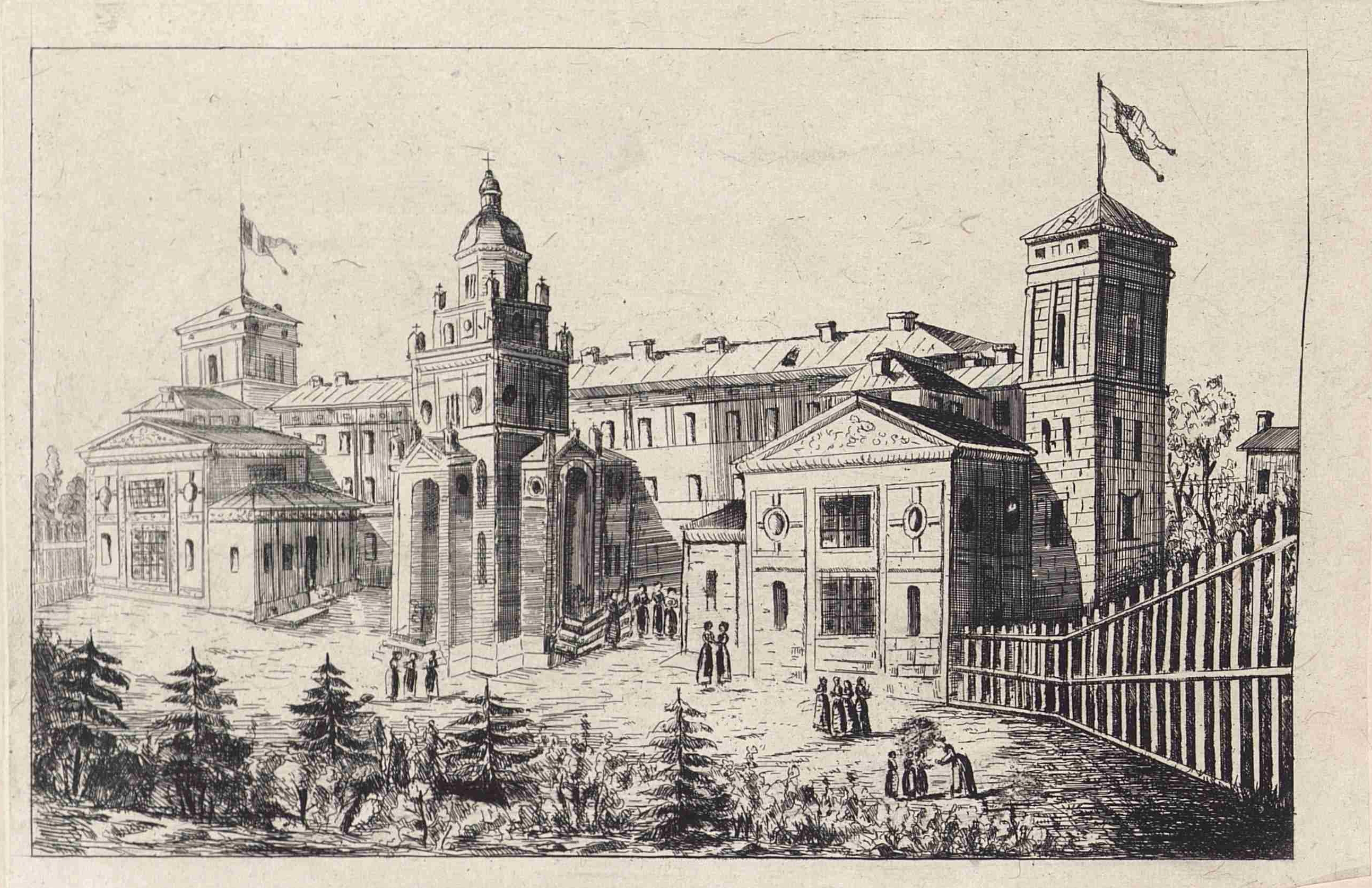
View of the Elena Doamna Asylum and High School, ca. 1882

Miller-Verghy went on to study at the University of Geneva, where she graduated in Letters and took a Doctorate in Philosophy (1894–1895). Upon her second return from Switzerland, Miller-Verghy became a teacher at girls' schools in Bucharest, and was headmistress of Elena Doamna. In 1900, she published her own French teaching aid, pentru usul claselor superióre de liceie și externate ("to be used by high schools and extern schools"), followed in 1903 by a French translation from Vlahuță's Picturesque Romania. As Ariel, she held a permanent column in the Bucharest newspaper La Patrie, while contributing articles to the literary review Sămănătorul, for which she used the signature Dionis ("Dionysus"). Additionally, Miller-Verghy became a vice president of the Maison d'Art club, a philanthropic society headed by Princess Elisabeth of Romania.

Having helped organize the vocational education department at Elena Doamna, and exhibit its work at the Romanian Atheneum (1907), she published a brochure on the subject of arts and crafts (1908). Exploring this interest, she patented her own girls' teaching aid, a loom she named Statu-Palmă.

Miller-Verghy still took interest in Eminescu translations, working with Adela Xenopol on a play that incorporated Eminescu's verse (1909). This was followed by a translation of William Shakespeare's King Lear, used by the National Theatre Bucharest. The National Theater also contracted her to translate Macbeth and As You Like It, then Robert Browning's Blot in the 'Scutcheon.

As an art critic and student of traditional technologies, Miller-Verghy researched the origin of weaving patterns and symbols, making educated assumptions about their pre-Christian origins. She discussed the swastika as both a positive and a negative symbol, and speculated that the Romanians' Thracian ancestors had created the Trojan and Etruscan civilizations. Such work resulted in the albums Izvoade strămoșești ("Ancient Sources") and Motifs anciens de décorations roumaines ("Ancient Romanian Patterns and Decorations"), both in 1911. That same year, she represented Romania at the first World Congress in Pedology.

Miller-Verghy also contributed a series of short prose works, which she signed with the names Marg. M-V., Mama Lola and Ion Pravilă. They comprised memoirs and contributions to children's literature, noted for both their refinement and sentimentality. She was inspired by, and incorporated text from, G. Bruno. Literary critic Bianca Burța-Cernat refers to the style of such books as "romanticized-moralizing prose for all-girl schools." Others have included her as among the first female representatives of modern literature in Romania. Her contemporaries gave her children's work a good reception: in 1912, her book for adolescents, Copiii lui Răzvan ("Răzvan's Children"), was awarded the Romanian Academy Alina Știrbey Prize.

Throughout her life, Miller-Verghy contributed to diverse newspapers and magazines, especially Viața Românească, Dreptatea, Flacăra and the French-language La Roumanie. She also had a strong social profile, as a member of leadership committees for several associations, and authored more textbooks. In 1912, Flacăra's almanac featured her translation from Elizabeth Barrett Browning. With Izabela Sadoveanu-Evan, Bucura Dumbravă and other women writers, Miller-Verghy was also a founding member of the Româncele Cercetașe Association, an early branch of Romanian Scouting (created in 1915, ancestor of Asociația Ghidelor și Ghizilor din România).

=== World War I and after ===
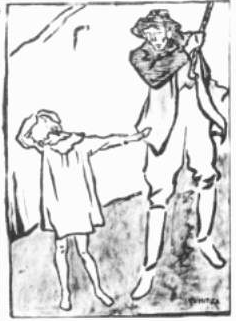
1920 cartoon by Nicolae Tonitza, criticizing the social exclusion of war orphans. The man, who is about to slap the child, exclaims: "A war orphan and out begging? Mind your rank, you moron!"

By 1914, Miller-Verghy had become the official translator for Romania's English-speaking Crown Princess (from 1916, Queen-consort) Marie of Edinburgh. This literary duo debuted with the tale Visătorul de vise ("Dreamer of Dreams"), edited by Flacăra, followed by Ilderim, Poveste în umbră și lumină ("Ilderim: A Tale of Light and Shade"). A year later, Miller-Verghy also contributed the Romanian version of Marie's story "Four Seasons from a Man's Life" (Patru anotimpuri din viața unui om), in an edition illustrated by painter Nicolae Grant. Queen Marie took an interest in Miller-Verghy's other work, and was enthusiastic about her rendition of Rabindranath Tagore's Gardener. She also published, in 1915, the Romanian version to Browning's Sonnets from the Portuguese.

In 1914–1916, the period between the outbreak of World War I and the Romanian Kingdom's affiliation to the Entente Powers, Miller-Verghy was the animator of a Bucharest-located cultural circle noted for its Germanophilia and support for the Central Powers. This club was notably attended by pianist Cella Delavrancea (Barbu Delevrancea's daughter) and by the poet Mateiu Caragiale. It was here that Caragiale met Marica Sion, whom he would marry in 1932. Miller-Verghy extended her patronage on the impoverished Caragiale, and, according to Grigri Ghica, helped him store his belongings in a stable she owned. Ghica also reported his aunt's astonishment upon discovering that Mateiu Caragiale was using the building to house his destitute mother. According to one critic's interpretation, Miller-Verghy inspired the character Arethy in Caragiale's prose work Sub pecetea tainei ("Under the Seal of Secrecy", 1930).

In 1916, Romania formally entered the Entente, and, after brief successes, was invaded by the Central Powers. In the battle for Bucharest, the Elena Doamna School became an overcrowded military hospital, and Miller-Verghy a registered Romanian Red Cross nurse. During the occupation of Bucharest, in June 1918, she and Maruca Cantacuzino helped establish a philanthropic society for the war orphans. Financed by charity shops, it continued to assist children in need even after the defeat of the Central Powers and the return of Bucharest into Romanian hands.

Mărgărita Miller-Verghy continued with her cultural activities during the interwar. Her contributions include the travel guide La Roumanie en images ("Romania in Pictures", Paris, 1919), which was marketed to a French and international audience, with the hope of improving awareness of Greater Romania. Also then, Miller-Verghy completed a novel, eponymously titled after Theano, a character in Greek mythology, and the play Pentru tine ("For You"), published respectively with the names Dionis and Ilie Cambrea. The French edition of Theano, published by Éditions Grasset, was sent by the author to John Galsworthy, the English novelist and playwright. In exchange, she was asking for permission to translate his Fraternity. Galsworthy wrote to thank Miller-Verghy, but informed her that the issue of copyrights still needed to be tackled.

On May 19, 1922, Mărgărita Miller-Verghy was admitted into the Romanian Writers' Society (SSR), the country's first professional organization in its field. She was by then manager of a small Bucharest theater (owned by the Maison d'Art), noted for hosting the experimental productions of writer-director Benjamin Fondane and a theater festival attended by Queen Marie. She was returning to children's literature, and, as Ilie Cambrea, drafted the project for a screenplay and silent film, Fantomele trecutului ("Ghosts of the Past").

=== 1924 accident and recovery ===
Her career almost ended in 1924. On visit to Paris, she was run over by a truck, and lost sight in both her eyes. She was treated for several years at a clinic in Nantes, but never recovered fully. However, the incident rekindled Miller-Verghy's interest in spirituality. In the mid-1920s, she was a registered member of the Theosophical Society, which was also joined by her Româncele Cercetașe friend, Bucura Dumbravă.

Turning to dictation, Miller-Verghy still maintained access to literary affairs. In 1925, she joined her old friend Adela Xenopol, by then a feminist militant, in creating Societatea Scriitoarelor Române ("The Romanian Women Writers' Society"). It ran against the SSR, labeling it "sexist", and elected Miller-Verghy as its vice president.

She was contributing to its tribune, Revista Scriitoarei ("The Woman Writer's Review"), joining a writing staff which also included cultural figures Xenopol, Constanța Hodoș, Aida Vrioni, Ana Conta-Kernbach, Sofia Nădejde, Hortensia Papadat-Bengescu and Sadoveanu-Evan. Founded as an explicitly all-female venue, it came to terms with the SSR and male authors in 1928, when it changed its name to Revista Scriitoarelor și Scriitorilor Români ("The Women and Men Writers' Review"). That same year, Societatea Scriitoarelor Române voted to dissolve itself.

Miller-Verghy built relationships with various other literary figures, among them female novelist Lucia Demetrius, with whom she became close friends, and Elena Văcărescu, who handed out the Maison d'Art scholarships. During the 1930s, this club purchased villas in Balcic, which were then used as vacation homes by painters and sculptors, and organized a series of music parties. From 1930, Miller-Verghy also planned a charity scheme, whereby students of Elena Doamna paid for the pensions of their retired schoolmistresses.

Between 1934 and 1936, Mărgărita Miller-Verghy worked on translating from the English the Queen Marie's complete autobiography, My Life. In parallel, she put out Romanian versions of Edgar Wallace's Fellowship of the Frog and John Esslemont's Bahá'u'lláh and the New Era.

She collected her own novellas into a volume, published in 1935 as Umbre pe ecran ("Shadows on the Screen"). The work drew praise from Romania modernist doyen, Eugen Lovinescu: "at least one of them, 'So That I May Die', is admirable." Two years later, the National Theater Bucharest staged her adaptation of Eufrosina Pallă's tale, Prințul cu două chipuri ("The Two-faced Prince"). It was a production specifically aimed at children, but tackled complex subjects (moral dualism, lust, human sacrifice) and had lengthy monologues. Critics found it unpalatable.

In parallel, Miller-Verghy became a historiographer of Romanian feminism. She and Ecaterina Săndulescu published an Evoluția scrisului feminin în România ("The Evolution of Feminine Writing in Romania"), which was prefaced by the same Lovinescu. Romanian linguist and critic Sanda Golopenția calls it "one of the most important references for any study devoted to literature written by Romanian women." According to researcher Elena Zaharia-Filipaș, Evoluția scrisului feminin... contains "exceptional" detail on the object of its study, "and many times constitutes a unique source". While she commends the volume for being "rare, useful and of an antiquated charm", Bianca Burța-Cernat disagrees with Zaharia-Filipaș on its exact importance, noting that Miller-Verghy and Săndulescu failed to even mention several women writers of importance.

=== Final years ===
Before and during World War II, Miller-Verghy was mainly active as a playwright. Bucharest troupes produced her Garden-party (1938) and După bal ("After the Ball", 1939). Radio Bucharest hosted her audio plays Derbyul ("The Derby") and Ramuncio. The academy presented her with a 1944 award, in honor of her novel Cealaltă lumină ("That Other Light").

In 1946, despite her blindness and her age-related illnesses, Miller-Verghy published her best-known work of fiction, Prințesa în crinolină ("The Princess in Crinoline"). It was a breakthrough in popular fiction and the Romanian detective novel. A self-defined "sensational mystery" carrying the dedication "to a friend forever hostile to detective novels", it introduced a style which was to influence a new generation of women writers. The book recounts the investigation of amateur detectives Diomed and Florin, who, together with their female colleague Clelia (disguised as a bricklayer), expose the killer of Moldavian-born Princess Ralü Muzuridi. The plot sees them traveling to the Northern Moldavian churches and the Transylvanian city of Brașov, attending high society parties, and meeting with the fictionalized version of English-born journalist Gordon Seymour.

The war had reduced Miller-Verghy to poverty, and she relied on handouts from her former students. She still had contracts as a translator: Ursula Parrott's Strangers May Kiss (titled Lisbeth in her version), followed by George Meredith's Rhoda Fleming. During the early years of the communist regime, she made her last contributions as a dramatist: Gura lumii ("People Talk") and Afin și Dafin ("Bilberry and Laurel").

The writer died at her Bucharest home, where her family was preparing to celebrate New Year's Day, 1954. She was buried alongside her mother Elena, at Bucharest's Bellu cemetery.
