= Bucura Dumbravă =

Romanian writer (1868–1926)

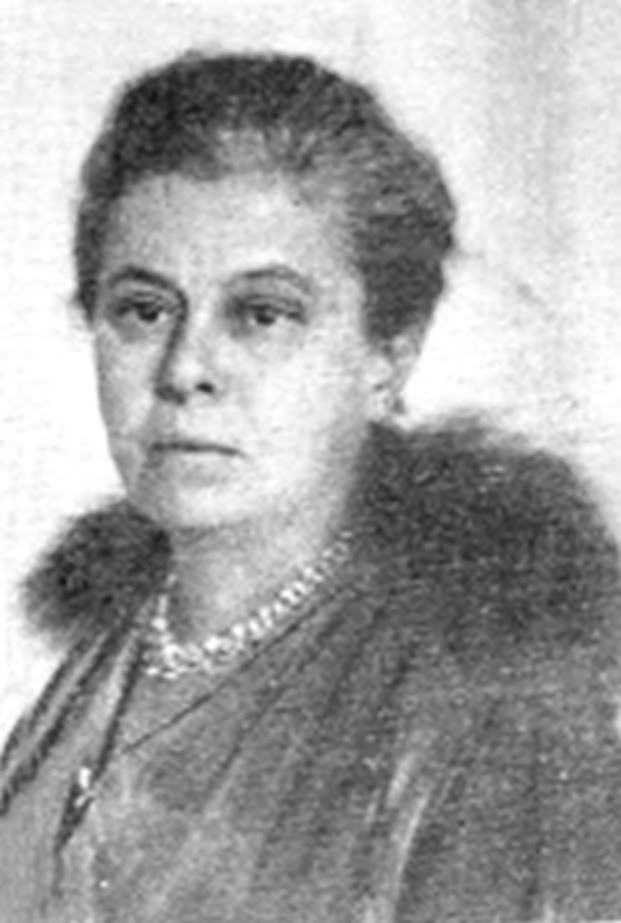
- The middle aged Bucura Dumbravă, photographed ca. 1920
- Title: President of the Romanian Theosophists' Lodge

Personal life
- Born: Ștefania "Fanny" Szekulics; December 28, 1868 Pressburg, Austria-Hungary
- Died: January 26, 1926 (aged 57) Port Said, Kingdom of Egypt

Religious life
- Religion: Theosophy
- School: Theosophical Society

Senior posting
- Period in office: 1925–1926

Bucura Dumbravă, pen name of Ștefania "Fanny" Szekulics, Szekulicz or Seculici (December 28, 1868 – January 26, 1926), was a Hungarian-born Romanian genre novelist, cultural promoter, hiker and Theosophist. Her literary work, mainly written in German, covers romantic stories about the legendary feats of hajduk heroes. They brought her commercial success in both German-speaking Europe and Romania, and were prefaced by Queen-consort Elisabeth of Wied.

Dumbravă promoted many causes, and was involved with several cultural projects, but is mainly remembered for her activity in promoting tourism and environmentalism in Romania. She was an avid traveler and mountaineer, who established some of the country's first hiking clubs. Her travel writing remains a standard in Romanian literature, even though her fiction work is generally forgotten.

Throughout most of her career, Szekulics promoted the inclusion of women in the Romanian Freemasonry. In old age, her essays came to focus on Spiritualist subjects, and, as disciple of Jiddu Krishnamurti, set up the Romanian lodge of the Theosophical Society. She died on her return trip from the British Raj, having attended the Theosophical Conference in Adyar.

== Biography ==
=== Early life ===
The future writer was born in the city of Bratislava (Pressburg). Her father was either Hungaro-Slovak or Slovak-Hungarian. On her mother's side, she was ethnic German. Dumbravă herself was raised into German culture, and therefore perceived as a German. Fanny spent her earliest childhood moving between the various parts of Austria-Hungary, visiting Vienna at age 4. A year later, her family had emigrated to the Kingdom of Romania, as friends of the Romanian King, Carol I. Her father worked as an insurance executive, and is credited by some historians with being supervisor of the Masonic Lodge zur Brüderlichkeit.

The royal family soon took notice of Fanny's piano-playing, of her talent for writing German-language poetry, and of her passion for reading Romanian romantic literature. At the court in Sinaia, she became a confidant and lady-in-waiting of Queen Elisabeth and, in July 1884, made her entry into high society as a guest of the royal couple.

In 1886, Fanny Szekulics became a philanthropist and social activist, founding Tibișoiul Society and providing Sunday school for lower-class children. In later years, she was mainly active as a music critic, art promoter, researcher at the Romanian Academy and lecturer on religious subjects, working with sculptor Carol Storck and musicologist Ion Popescu-Pasărea. In 1905, she established, together with politician Vintilă Brătianu, Chindia Society, for the preservation and cultivation of Romanian folklore, specifically folk dances. She was joined there by socialite Frozy Nenițescu, who recalled that, at least originally, the society fought against oriental influences in Romanian dress and shunned the "noise-making" tarafuri, and was in turn criticized for its "exclusivity". Their work was documented in a 1913 film by Nicolae Barbelian, which commits to cultural memory ten individual national dances taught at Chindia.

Fanny followed her father's Masonic beliefs and joined into the controversial "Rites of Adoption" Masonry. She corresponded with Annie Besant and Le Droit Humain, becoming recognized as Diva of the Rosy Cross 9th Degree, and probably used the Chindia group in the recruitment of new members.

=== Literary debut ===
Szekulics' first published volume is Der Haiduck ("The Hajduk"), printed by W. Wunderling of Regensburg in 1908. The same year, translated by Teodor Nica, it saw print with Carol Sfetea of Bucharest, as Haiducul (second edition and third, 1911; fourth edition, 1914). Pseudonymous, the book enjoyed the allure of mystery, and some assumed that it was in fact a literary attempt by Queen Elisabeth. The latter had in fact suggested Szekulics' pen name, which echoes the mountainous surroundings of Sinaia: Lake Bucura and the common noun dumbravă ("grove").

A historical novel, Der Haiduck was described in Mercure de France as a fresco of "Romania's first patriots", with an "entrapping subject matter" and a "perfectly adequate sobriety" of tone. In Transylvania, critic Ilarie Chendi reported being pleasantly surprised by both the book and the good reception it received in Germany. According to Chendi, the work was notable for its sympathetic depiction of the Romanian peasants, with their "clean and ancient way of life". Critics were drawn to Szekulics' minute historical research, which included the verification of historical records in the Hurmuzachi collection, but also inspiration from the popular novels of N. D. Popescu-Popnedea. More controversially, she borrowed heavily from a family manuscript on hajduk Iancu Jianu, and was therefore suspected of plagiarism. The work was also criticized for perpetuating the negative myth of Nikola Abraš (or "Iabraș"), Jianu's main ally, as a traitor to the hajduk insurgency.

Der Haiduck came out a second time, in 1912, with a foreword by Elisabeth (signed with her pen name, Carmen Sylva). The same year, Dumbravă completed her "history of the Wallachian uprising of 1821", as Der Pandur ("The Pandur"). It too was published by Wunderling in Germany, and, in Eliza Brătianu's translation, by Carol Sfetea, before being entirely redone in Romanian by the author herself. The narrative centers on the folk hero Tudor Vladimirescu, depicted as the impersonation of national awakening, but also as a ruthless commander and a blunt politician.

Der Pandur was a sequel to Der Haiduck. The final part of this trilogy, focusing on the Wallachian Revolution of 1848, was burned, by accident, before it could be published. Dumbravă never returned to it, but, by 1918, was conceiving of another novel, tentatively called Book of Sibyl. She still registered success as an amateur musician. In 1913, at Elisabeth's Peleș Castle, her piano-playing accompanied two famous Romanian violinists, George Enescu and Dimitrie Dinicu.

=== Hiker and philanthropist ===
During those decades, the friendship between Dumbravă and Queen Elisabeth centered on their shared interest for hiking through the Southern Carpathians, to and from Sinaia. For Dumbravă, traveling was already a weekly pastime. As recalled by witnesses of these escapades, the physically unattractive and myopic Dumbravă was much admired for her joyful spirit and her adventure-seeking. She wore tailor-made mountaineer's clothes, rode a "famous mare" named Liza, and set up her main camp at the Ialomiței caves. According to Frozy Nenițescu, Dumbravă also took political risks, crossing back into Austria-Hungary, and irritating the Hungarian Border Guard officials with her presence.

With the discovery of this passion, Szekulics turned her attention to travel literature. According to comparatist Luiza Marinescu, her subsequent work should be regarded as fitting in with the Romanian tradition of "descriptive romantic literature" (Alexandru Odobescu, Alexandru Vlahuță, Calistrat Hogaș, Nicolae Iorga), but also as informing the German public about "Romanian specificity". More specifically, critic Mihail Dragomirescu suggests, Szekulics was a disciple of the Junimea society. Himself a member of Junimea, Dragomirescu places the female novelist among the authors illustrating the neoromantic "national ideal" literature promoted, ca. 1900, by cultural theorist Titu Maiorescu.

By 1914, Fanny Szekulics was helping with Queen Elisabeth's charities, a member of the "Ladies' Committee" at the Queen Elisabeth Polyclinic, Bucharest, and a co-manager of Țesătoarea Career School. With Mărgărita Miller Verghy, Izabela Sadoveanu-Evan and other women writers, Sadoveanu was also a founding member of the Româncele Cercetașe Association, an early branch of Romanian Scouting, and, in this respect, predecessor the Asociația Ghidelor și Ghizilor din România.

Soon after, Carol I died, leaving Elisabeth a widow. Reportedly, Dumbravă was able to revive her friend's interest in hiking and literature even after this loss, and, together with the queen, began work on a book of meditation, the never-completed Cartea Îngerilor ("Book of Angels"). She delivered one of Elisabeth's funeral orations upon her death in November 1916.

=== Cartea munților and Touring Club ===
Fanny Szekulics resumed her activity after World War I. While new editions of Haiducul came out in 1919 and 1925, Dumbravă put out editions of her best-selling new essays: Cartea munților ("The Book of the Mountains") and Ceasuri sfinte ("Holy Hours"). Her first works to be written directly in Romanian, they consolidated her reputation among conservatives and monarchists. According to M. Dragomirescu: "Cartea munților [is] a masterpiece of sound Romanian inspiration and healthy language [...]. Therein is so much love of nature, so much intimacy with the mountains' godly beauties, [...] that it is, without doubt, one of the best works in our literature." At the traditionalist review Transilvania, literary chronicler Ion Georgescu upheld Ceasuri sfinte as the antithesis of modernist literature, and as such "a blessing on the Romanian soul".

The new writings blended cultural activism, social ideals, and contemplation of natural beauty. Cartea munților thus stands out for promoting environmental protection, with exhortations such as: "Demand, for each and all, the right to rest in the bosom of nature, the right to sunlight, to fresh air, to the green forest, to the thrills of the desire to climb up mountains". She was welcoming in influences from the Western Spiritualists, quoting at length from Emanuel Swedenborg's views on the purified and purifying energy of the mountains, concluding: "The discovery of alpine beauty has been a victory of soul over matter." Mystical, ethical and self-help subjects formed the bulk of Ceasuri sfinte, which revives and reinterprets symbolic episodes from various religious sources: the Book of Jeremiah, the Biblical apocrypha, the Acts of the Apostles, Joan of Arc's call to arms, etc.

Szekulics' literary fragments and chronicles were published in various magazines of the day, including Convorbiri Literare, Ideea Europeană, Cuget Românesc, Henric Sanielevici's Curentul Nou, Gala Galaction's Cultul Eroilor Noștri, and George Bacaloglu's Cele Trei Crișuri. Such essays included a 1919 introduction to the Synarchist ideas of Alexandre Saint-Yves d'Alveydre, explaining them as a superior mix of "nationalism" and "humanitarianism".

Dumbravă's activism resulted in the creation of modern national tourism associations: in 1921, Hanul Drumeților (Travelers' Inn), followed in 1925 by the Romanian Touring Club. She co-opted other locally famous hikers: physician Nestor Urechia, who is mentioned in her writings as "The Great Bear", geographer Mihai Haret, and writer Emanoil Bucuța of Boabe de grâu journal, who recognized in her one of the founders of Romanian "Carpathianism". According to Bucuța, Dumbravă presided over a "school" of hiking, which was less daring and more accessible than the mountaineering promoted by her male colleagues.

At its height, the Touring Club enlisted 4,000 members, grouped into 12 regional subsections, publishing specialized topographic maps, marking tourist paths, and actively protecting the environment. The circle was joined by the young poet Luca Caragiale, who was supposed to compose verse for Cartea munților, and by Mircea Eliade, the future novelist and historian of religions.

Despite old age, Szekulics resumed her active lifestyle. In 1923, she was in Switzerland, where she climbed the Matterhorn, returning in 1925 to escalate one of the Mont Blanc glaciers. Back in Romania, she set up a regional standard for women's rock climbing, after reaching the summit of Omu Peak. She later settled in Bran borough, at Poarta village, where she intended to set up her own hostel.

=== Theosophy and final years ===
During the latter part of her life, Szekulics became an avid participant in Theosophy, a modern spiritual movement centered on the teachings of Helena Blavatsky. According to Bucuța, this was a natural step from her "credo", the love of travel as physical exercise, to her belief in eternal transition, or reincarnation. Together with E. F. D. Bertram of Ploiești, the writer founded Romania's first Theosophist Circle, Frăția ("Brotherhood"). Located at her Dorobanți townhouse, it was originally a section of the Theosophical Society chapter in France, but soon emancipated itself as an autonomous Society branch, and set up its own regional network.

Her circle introduced Romanians to the writings of Jiddu Krishnamurti, with the 1924 collection La picioarele învățătorului ("By the Feet of the Teacher"), translated in her own hand. Like the other prominent Romanian Theosophists, Szekulics affiliated with the Romanian Masonic section, that paid obedience to the National Union of Lodges. She held Spiritist sessions at the Marmorosch Blank Hall, with Luca's brother, Mateiu Caragiale, and feminist Eugenia de Reuss Ianculescu as (more or less implicated) witnesses.

Szekulics, called "perhaps the most involved" Romanian Theosophist by author Constantina Raveca Buleu, eventually presided upon the Theosophical Society's Romanian chapter (est. 1925). Her contributions as a cultural journalist saw print in several new papers, for instance the Theosophical Society sheet Știri și Însemnări, Constantin Angelescu's Democrația, and the Association of Christian Women's Foaia Noastră. She was also involved as an auditor and reviewer for the feminist Romanian Women Writers' Society, alongside Sofia Nădejde and Laura Vampa.

As a result of her Theosophical conversion, Szekulics became fascinated with the concepts of Indian philosophy, and dreamed of traveling to the British Raj. She got her chance in late 1925, when she was invited to the Theosophical Society Conference, in Adyar. Frozy Nenițescu, who walked her off to Gara de Nord, recalls that Dumbravă was highly emotional traveling "into the land of her dreams."

Dumbravă took the journey, arriving at Mumbai port, and then taking the Indian Railways to Chennai (Madras). At Adyar, she met Krishnamurti. She then took trips through the Bengal Presidency and the Kingdom of Mysore.

Having contracted malaria, Szekulics fell seriously ill on her way home. The ship she was on left her in Port Said, Egypt, where she was quickly transported to hospital. Her health worsened and she died there on January 26. According to legend, she had hoped to see the Carpathians, believing that only their sight could cure her. For reasons unknown, her body was cremated, and her ashes were transported back to Romania inside an Egyptian vase.

== Legacy ==
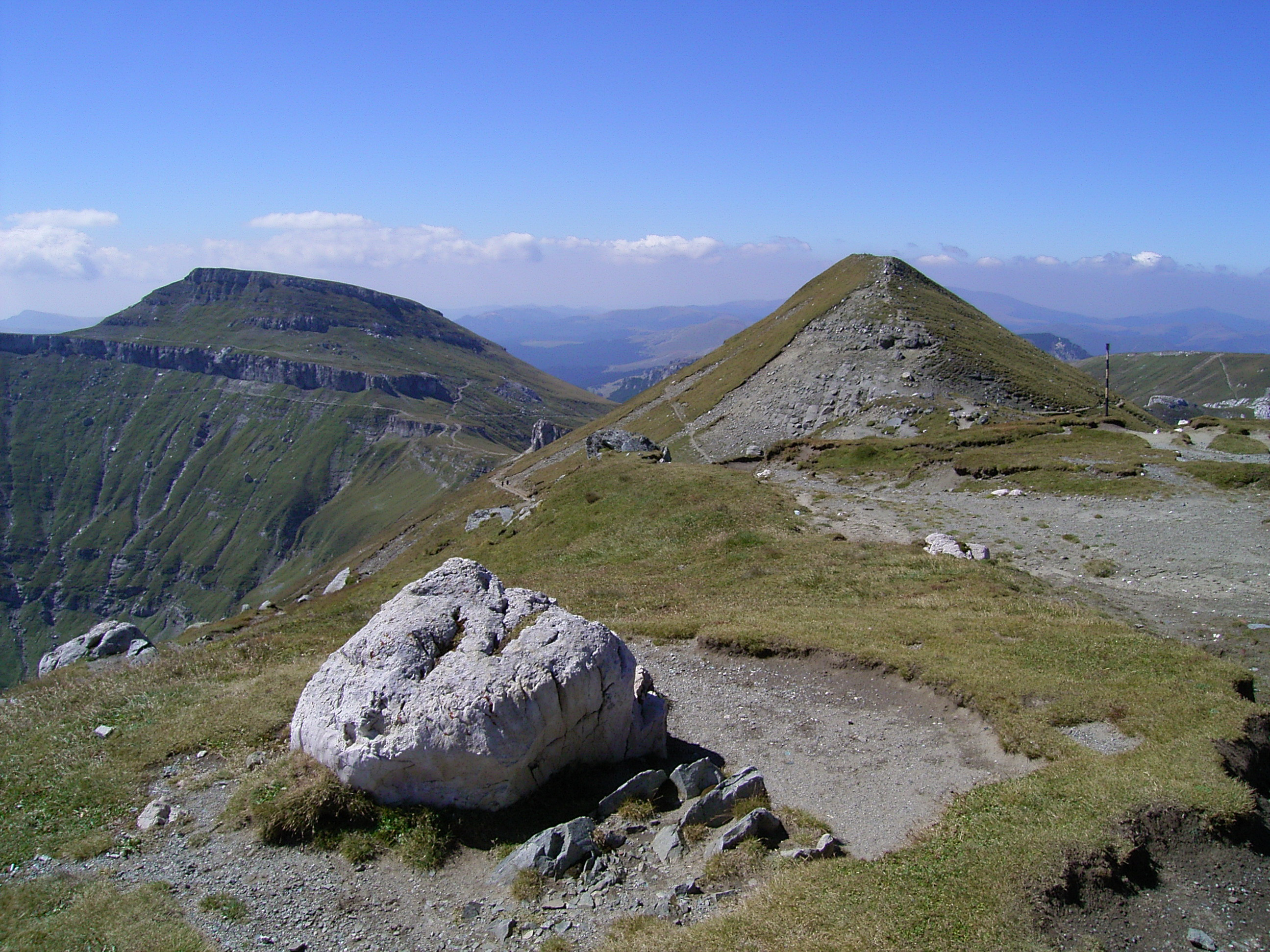
Bucura Dumbravă Peak, pictured on the right

Shortly after her death, Fanny Szekulics was honored with a memorial piece in Convorbiri Literare, signed by Alexandru Tzigara-Samurcaș, the art historian and courtier. Similarly, Țara Noastră journal assessed: "Her ashen hand [...] will find a good shelter in the soil of our country—a welcoming and loving mother to all those who understand her". The Bucura Dumbravă Peak—at 2,503 m (8,212 ft), the second highest peak in the Bucegi Mountains, and identified by some with the sacred Kogaionon—was named in the writer's honor.

Her last volume, grouping her letters, came out in 1927 as Pe drumurile Indiei. Cele din urmă pagini ("On India's Roads. The Very Last Pages"). Moreover, in 1928, Der Haiduck inspired a Romanian film, with Horia Igirosanu as director. Part of Szekulics' estate was passed on to Elena Râmniceanu and the Romanian Institute for Social Studies. It was set up as the annual Bucura Dumbravă Award for Ethics, and had as its first recipient Emanoil Bucuța. A "friends of Bucura Dumbravă" circle still reunited periodically in commemoration of her death, and, in 1934, published a tribute volume, Când trec anii ("As Years Pass").

Her books went through several reprints, before, during, and after World War II, and inspired illustrations by woman artist Olga Greceanu. In 1942, Der Haiduck was used by C. N. Mihăilescu and Ion Șahighian as the basis for another feature film, Iancu Jianul.

Despite being relatively famous in her lifetime, Bucura Dumbravă was generally ignored by later schools of literary criticism. As noted by Luiza Marinescu, "she was not included in neither Romanian literary histories nor German ones" (with the exception of Enciclopedia Cugetarea, 1940), and was disregarded for her presence on Queen Elisabeth's "camarilla". Writing in 1935, essayist Petru Comarnescu opined that Bucura Dumbravă's work had a "local" character, and was far less important than that of her modernist peers—Hortensia Papadat-Bengescu, Henriette Yvonne Stahl. Still, Perpessicius writes, Cartea munților survives as the "vade mecum of hiking".

Authors were more interested in her adventurous life and her Theosophical ideas. Completed shortly after her death, the novel Craii de Curtea-Veche by Mateiu Caragiale makes a sarcastic reference to her as "the theosophist Papura Jilava", briefly seen dancing with the antagonist. As a mystic who died mysteriously, Szekulics is notably mentioned in Mircea Eliade's 1940 novella, Secretul doctorului Honigberger.

After the establishment of a communist regime, Dumbravă's work, with its monarchist connections, was removed from the literary canon. In the Romanian diaspora, however, two more editions of her work were published (1954, 1956). At home, such reconsideration came in 1969, when historian Dumitru Almaș and Editura Tineretului republished Brătianu's 1912 translation; literary critic Mircea Handoca also put up a 1970 reprint of Cartea munților, at Editura Stadion. A ballet adaptation of Haiducul was also produced by the Romanian National Opera, followed in 1982 by another Iancu Jianu film, with Dinu Cocea as director and Adrian Pintea as the star actor.

Still, biographical entries on her were scarcely found in specialty works until the Romanian Revolution of 1989, when she came to be mentioned in standardized writers' dictionaries. In 2011, cartoonist Vali Ivan relied on her Der Haiduck to draw a graphic novel about the times of Iancu Jianu.
