= Ana Conta-Kernbach =

Romanian teacher, writer and women's rights activist

- Born: Ana Conta; 5 November 1865; Târgu Neamț, Romanian United Principalities
- Died: 13 December 1921 (aged 56); Iași, Kingdom of Romania
- Resting place: Eternitatea Cemetery, Iași
- Other name: Ana Conta Kernbach
- Education: University of Iași; University of Paris
- Occupations: teacher, writer, women's rights activist
- Years active: 1883–1921
- Employer: Mihail Sturdza Normal School
- Parents: Grigore Conta (father); Marioara (Scutariu) Conta (mother)
- Relatives: Vasile Conta (brother)

Ana Conta-Kernbach (5 November 1865 – 13 December 1921) was a Romanian teacher, writer, and women's rights activist. Educated at the Humpel Institute in Iași, she graduated in 1883 and began teaching there that same year. Continuing her studies at the same time, she enrolled at the University of Iaşi, studying both in the normal school and philosophical faculties. In 1885, she transferred to the Oltea Doamna Lyceum and graduated in 1888. In 1893, she went to Paris to study at the University of Paris and the Collège de France, earning her doctorate in 1895. Returning to Romania, she became the director of the Normal School of Applications and taught both pedagogy and psychology at the Mihail Sturdza Normal School for more than two decades.

In addition to her teaching Conta-Kernbach published literary works beginning 1891 and in her later life as an active suffragist published articles in favor of women's rights and equality. She was one of the founders in 1918, of the Association for the Civil and Political Emancipation of Romanian Women in Iași. The first woman admitted to the General Council of Instruction, she also served from 1913 as the inspector for all girls' schools throughout the country until her death in 1921. Conta-Kernbach was honored twice by the government of Romania with the Educational Work Reward Medal, first class, for both primary and secondary education. She is regarded as one of the pioneering teachers who helped develop the educational system and pedagogic theory in Romania.

== Early life ==
Ana Conta was born on 5 November 1865 in Târgu Neamț in the Romanian United Principalities to Marioara (née Scutariu) and Grigore Conta. She was the next to last sibling in the family of ten children, which included her older brother Vasile Conta, who would become a philosopher and politician. Her family was originally from the commune of Bodeștii-Precistei, where several generations had served in the priesthood of the Romanian Orthodox Church. Her father was hired in 1864 to serve at the Bărboi Monastery in Iași, where the family moved soon after her birth. Her mother died when Conta was young, and her brother Vasile became an important influence on her sense of responsibility to address societal issues. He also encouraged her musical ability and she became an accomplished pianist.

In 1878, Conta entered the Humpel Institute. She completed the seven-year curricula within five years and graduated in 1883. Continuing her education, that year, she entered the University of Iași studying both in the normal school and philosophical faculties. Simultaneously with her university studies, she taught history, logic, and psychology at the Humpel Institute, until 1885, when she began teaching at the Liceul "Oltea Doamna" (Oltea Doamna Lyceum), where she remained for almost a decade. Conta obtained her degree, magna cum laude in 1888 and in 1891, married poet Gheorghe Kernbach, who encouraged her to begin writing and publishing both poems and prose. Her debut as a writer occurred in Convorbiri Literare (Literary Conversations) in 1891 and other works were soon published in the journals Junimea literară (Literary Jubilee) and Arhiva (Archive). In 1893, Conta-Kernbach went to Paris, without her husband to continue her education. Taking courses in art history, pedagogy, and philosophy, she studied at the University of Paris and the Collège de France.

== Career ==
That year, at the request of the Ministry of Education, Conta-Kernbach produced two reports evaluating vocational education available to girls in France. The following year, she provided an assessment on the same topic for girls from Saint Petersburg. In 1895, she completed her doctorate, again graduating magna cum laude, and returned to Iași, where she began teaching pedagogy and psychology at the Mihail Sturdza Normal School and would remain there for more than 20 years. She also was named by the Ministry of Education as the director of the Școlii Normale de Aplicație (Normal School of Applications) and worked to modernize the professionalism of teachers with pedagogic training at both schools. Her approach to pedagogy was to use both association and experimental psychology put forth by masters like John Amos Comenius, Friedrich Fröbel, John Locke, and others and apply their ideas to education from a Romanian context.

Conta-Kernbach was one of the first Romanian delegates sent by the government to international scientific meetings. She participated in the International Congress of Women's Institutions, held in Paris in 1899, the International Congress of Pedagogy, hosted in Brussels in 1911, as well as other events hosted in Geneva and Nuremberg. They also sent her abroad to research the organization of schools in France and Germany and she became the first woman admitted to the General Council of Instruction. The Council of Instruction is the body which determines requirements for schooling and from 1913 until her death, she served as the inspector for all girls' schools throughout the country. She was awarded the medal Răsplata Muncii pentru Învățământ (Educational Work Reward Medal) first class, for primary education and later the same award for secondary education.

During World War I, Conta-Kernbach became involved in the feminist movement and began publishing articles about wage equity and protecting women's rights to be professionals. She proposed that women be allowed to become citizens in their own right, and supported women's suffrage, co-founding the Asociția pentru emanciparea civilă și politică a femeilor române (Association for the Civil and Political Emancipation of Romanian Women) in Iași in 1918, along with Calypso Botez, Maria Baiulescu, Elena Meissner, Ella Negruzzi, Izabela Sadoveanu, Ortansa Satmary, and Olga Sturdza. The goals of the Association were to work for legal, socio-economic, and political rights of women. That year, universal suffrage for men over the age of 21 was passed by the legislature and women were promised that at a future date their right to vote would be considered. In 1920, Conta-Kernbach petitioned the legislature to grant political rights for women who had demonstrated their public service, participated in the war, or who were wives and mothers of soldiers who fought in the conflict.

== Death and legacy ==
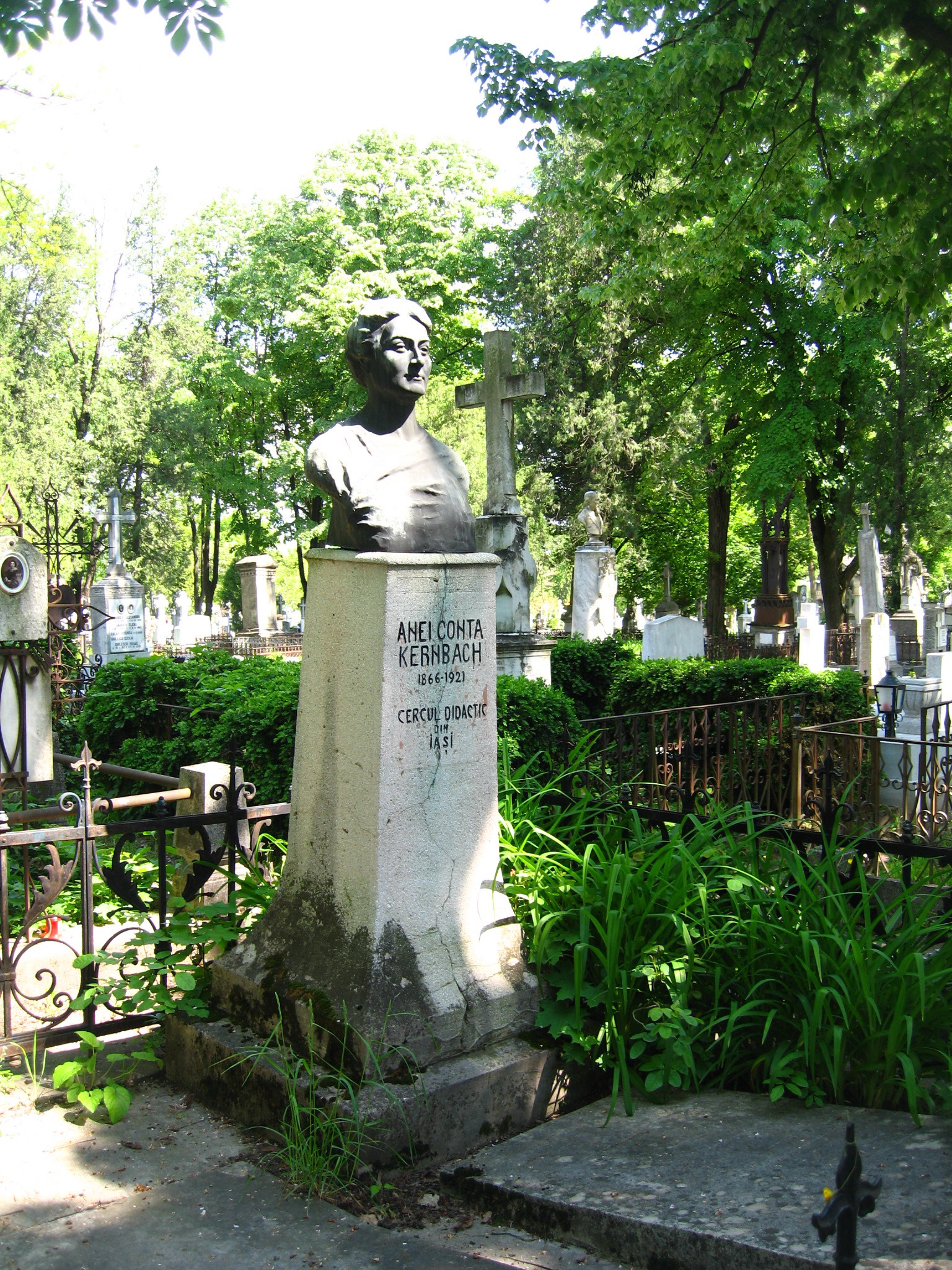
Ana Conta-Kernbach's grave at Eternitatea Cemetery

Conta-Kernbach died from heart disease on 13 December 1921 in Iași and was buried in the city's Eternitatea Cemetery. In 1925, when Adela Xenopol established Revista scriitoarei (Woman Writer's Magazine), Conta-Kernbach was one of the featured feminists, whose writings were profiled in the influential journal. She is remembered as one of the pioneers who helped systematize Romanian pedagogy practices and education.

== Selected works ==
=== Journalism ===
- Munca și plata ei. Reglementarea petrecerilor (Work and Pay Them: Regulating Parties, 1919)
- În chestiunea feministă (The Feminist Question, 1920)
- Pentru ridicarea Iașului (To Raise Iași, 1920)
- Cu toții la muncă (We All Work, 1921)

=== Literature ===
- Clipe (Moments, 1897)
- Fulgi (Flakes, 1905)
- Biografia lui Vasile Conta (Biography of Vasile Conta, 1916)
- Boabe de mărgean (Beads of Coral, 1922)
- Pulbere (Powder 1925)

=== Scientific ===
- Școlile profesionale din Franța (Professional Schools in France, 1893)
- Dezideratele Congresului din Petersburg privitoare la organizarea învățămîntului profesional de fete, (Petersburg Congress Goals Concerning the Organization of Girls' Professional Education, 1894)
- Les programmes actuels et la nouvelle méthode d’enseignement, au point de vue de l’hygiene intellectuelle (The Current Programs and the New Method of Teaching, from the Intellectual Hygiene Point of View, 1904)
- Școlare (School, 1904)
- Elemente de metodică (Elements of Methodology, 1905)
- Elemente de pedagogie (Elements of Pedagogy, 1907)
- L’éducation manuelle (The Education Manual, 1913)
- Noțiuni de pedagogie și metodică (Notions of Pedagogy and Methodology, 1914)
- Despre muzică (About Music, 1920)
- Elemente de cultură generală: Noțiuni de Pedagogie, Didactică și Metodică (General Culture Elements: Notions of Pedagogy, Didactics and Methodology, 1921)
- Logică și psihologie: Schița unui manual de școală. Anexă la Elemente de cultură generală: Noțiuni de Pedagogie, Didactică și Metodică (Logic and psychology: Sketch of a school textbook. Annex to General Culture Elements: Notions of Pedagogy, Didactics and Methodology, 1921)
