= Eugenia de Reuss Ianculescu =

Romanian teacher, writer and women's rights activist

- c. 1912
- Born: Eugenia de Reuss-Mirza; 11 March 1866; Igești, Bukovina, Austrian Empire(now Yizhivtsi, Chernivtsi Oblast, Ukraine)
- Died: 29 December 1938 (aged 72); Igești, Storojineț County, Kingdom of Romania
- Other names: Eugenia de Reus-Ianculescu, Eugenia Ianculescu
- Occupations: Teacher, writer, women's rights activist
- Years active: 1889–1938
- Known for: Suffrage activist

Eugenia de Reuss Ianculescu (11 March 1866 – 29 December 1938) was a Romanian teacher, writer, and women's rights activist. She was one of the founders of the Women's League, the first feminist organization in Romania, and later was the founder of the League for Romanian Women's Rights and Duties. Fighting for women's suffrage for fifty years, she wrote novels, delivered lectures, cultivated support of politicians and presented legislative petitions, earning in the year of her death, the right for Romanian women to participate in general elections.

== Biography ==
Eugenia de Reuss Ianculescu was born on 11 March 1866 in Igești, a village in the Bukovina region of the Austrian Empire, which became Austria-Hungary the following year. Born on the estate of her father, she was the daughter of the aristocrats, Maria Dinotto-Gusti and Alexandru de Reuss-Mirza. After receiving her primary education in Iași, capital of the Romanian Old Kingdom's Moldavia region, she became a teacher and traveled frequently to France and Italy with the Hellenic and Latin Association and an archaeology association of which she was a member. Some time after completion of her schooling, Reuss married Ianculescu, but no information is known of her husband, beyond that he was a superior officer in the infantry of the 29th Regiment of Dorohoi.

== Women's rights activism ==
In 1889, while teaching in Iași, Reuss Ianculescu attempted to create a suffrage association, but was unable to attract interest. She made a second attempt to found a feminist society in 1891 with encouragement from Marya Chéliga-Loevy, but again was thwarted. Finally, on 30 October 1894, the first women's organization in Romania was approved by the General Assembly, once Reuss Ianculescu had successfully recruited Cornelia Emilian to become president. Emilian was the wife of a prominent professor, as well as a writer and women's activist. The women founded the Women's League (Liga Femeilor Române) at Iași and began publishing a journal called Buletinul Ligii Femeilor (Women's League Bulletin), which featured articles on international feminism and women's rights. The organization remained active for five years, folding at the turn of the century. When the Women's League folded, Reuss Ianculescu left Iași and moved to Bucharest.

Reuss Ianculescu turned to writing and published a string of novels over the next few years, including Voință (Volition, 1902), Spre dezrobire (Towards Emancipation, 1903), Pentru o Idee (For an ideal, 1904), and Menirea femeii (Woman’s Fate, 1906). Voinţă was nominated for a prize from the Romanian Academy. Spree was dedicated to her daughter who died as an infant. With her growing acclaim, after publishing Towards Emancipation, Reuss Ianculescu was spurred to give a series of lectures on women's rights at the Romanian Athenaeum in Bucharest. The themes included topics about the destiny and future of women given in 1906 and women in politics, presented in 1913.

Success of the lectures led Reuss Ianculescu to the establishment in 1910 of the Societatea pentru Drepturile Femeilor (Women’s Emancipation Society), which was renamed as the Liga Drepturilor şi Datoriilor Femeilor din România (LDDFR) (League for Romanian Women’s Rights and Duties) in 1913. The organization was the first women's association which was specifically aimed at enfranchisement and though founded in Bucharest, had branches throughout Moldavia and Wallachia. Dr. Nicolae Minovici and Reuss Ianculescu acted as co-presidents and Constantin G. Dissescu, Minister of Public Instruction served as honorary president. Incorporation of influential men into the leadership was a tactic employed by Reuss Ianculescu to gain the support of influential politicians and a manifestation of her belief that men and women had complementary skills which could be joined to achieve success. By 1912, she was editing a monthly journal for the organization called Droit des Femmes (Women's Rights) and in 1913, the LDDFR presented a demand to the Romanian Parliament for women's civil and political rights.

That same year, Reuss Ianculescu affiliated the LDDFR with the International Women's Suffrage Alliance. In 1914, she and a small group of activists, including Maria Gavrilescu, Elena Meissner and Adela Xenopol supported a petition for women’s suffrage to be incorporated into the Constitution of the Kingdom of Romania, which was under debate. Though she tried to work with the Cercul Feminin Socialist (Socialist Feminine Circle) to forward the cause, they rejected aligning with LDDFR because they felt that her organization excluded working class women and was focused too heavily on educated women. During the war she gave lectures, attended meetings and conferences and tried to forward the cause of women’s political involvement. She declined an invitation by Aletta Jacobs to attend the 1915 International Congress of Women, believing that the congress was forcing women to choose pacifism over nationalism, and she fully pledged her loyalty to Romania.

At the end of the war, when Transylvania and Romania were united in 1918, Reuss Ianculescu became vice president of Uniunea Femeior Române din România Mare (Union of Romanian Women from Greater Romania), which was headed by Maria Baiulescu. In 1921 the LDDFR joined in the umbrella association Consiliul Național al Femeilor Române (National Council of Romanian Women). Reuss Ianculescu served as vice president of the new organization, which became affiliated with the International Council of Women. Two years later, Reuss Ianculescu was appointed as "president for life" of LDDFR. Between 1926 and 1935, Reuss Ianculescu served as a board member of International Women's Suffrage Alliance. When the 1923 Constitution of Romania was drafted it did not offer women the right to vote, instead treating them as legal incompetents. Reuss Ianculescu continued pushing through the various organizations to secure suffrage and the women were partially successful, when in 1929, they won the right to participate in local elections. In 1938, they won the right to participate in general elections, though they would lose those rights the following year.

Reuss Ianculescu died on 29 December 1938 in her home in Igești, which at that time was part of Greater Romania.

== Selected works ==
- Voință (1902) București, Romania (in Romanian)
- Spre dezrobire (1903) București, Romania (in Romanian)
- Pentru o Idee (1904) București, Romania (in Romanian)
- Menirea femeii (1906) București, Romania (in Romanian)
- Menirea femeii și rolul ei în viitor: Conferință ținută la Ateneul din București la 16 aprilie 1906 (in Romanian). Bucharest, Romania. 1906.
- "Femeia română și política". Drepturile Femeii (in Romanian). 2. Bucharest, Romania: 12–25. January–February 1913.
