= Siretu =

Siretu may refer to several villages in Romania:

- Siretu, a village in Letea Veche Commune, Bacău County
- Siretu, a village in Săucești Commune, Bacău County
- Siretu, a village in the town of Mărășești, Vrancea County
