= Schineni =

Schineni may refer to the following places:

== Romania ==
- Schineni, a village in Sascut Commune, Bacău County
- Schineni, a village in Săucești Commune, Bacău County
- Schineni, a village administered by Murgeni town, Vaslui County

== Moldova ==
- Schineni, Soroca, a commune in Soroca district
