= Organizația Națională a Scouților din Moldova =

National Scouting organization of Moldova

Asociaţia Naţională a Scouţilor din Moldova
- National Scout Association of Moldova
- Owner: Natalia Covalciuc-Zmuncila
- Country: Moldova
- Founded: 1994
- Membership: 2,430
- Affiliation: World Organization of the Scout Movement
- Website www.scout-moldova.md

The Organizația Națională a Scouților din Moldova (National Organization of the Scouts of Moldova, ONSM), the national Scouting organization of Moldova, became a member of the World Organization of the Scout Movement in 1997. The coeducational Organizaţia Naţională a Scouţilor din Moldova has 2,430 members as of 2011.

Scouting was founded in Moldova in 1913, and a founding member of WOSM as part of Romania in 1922, until Scouting was banned by the government of Carol II in 1937.

After the fall of communism, Scouting restarted in Moldova in 1991, but the War of Transnistria of 1992-1993 greatly slowed its development. In 1994, a national Scout organization was formed, and officially registered under the name Organizaţia Naţională a Scouţilor din Moldova.

By 1997, the Scout organization had developed well enough to gain recognition from the World Bureau. On April 18, 1997, the World Organization of the Scout Movement welcomed Moldova as a member country. As of January 1, 1998, the Organizaţia Naţională a Scouţilor din Moldova included 1,540 registered Scouts, boys and girls, in 39 groups throughout the country.

On October 1, 2023, ONSM joined the European Scout Region, as the Eurasian region was dissolved.

== Program and ideals ==
Sections:

- Cub Scouts-7 to 11
- Scouts-12 to 15
- Rovers-16 to 20

The Scout Motto is Gata Oricând, translating as "Always Ready" in Romanian. The Romanian noun for a single Scout is Cercetaş, but in Moldova, Scout is used as frequently.

The Scouts do not own any campsites. Camps are held in any suitable place.

== International Scouting in Moldova ==
- In addition, there are USA Girl Scouts Overseas in Chişinău, serviced by way of USAGSO headquarters in New York City.
- A Jewish Israel Scouts tribe was established in Chişinău in 2009.

== See also ==
- Cercetaşii României
- Asociația Ghidelor și Ghizilor din România
- Scouting in Romania
