= Adela Xenopol =

Romanian feminist and writer

- Born: 1861; Iași, United Principalities
- Died: 1939 (aged 77–78); Bucharest, Kingdom of Romania
- Occupations: writer, feminist
- Years active: 1879–1928

Adela Xenopol (1861–1939) was a Romanian feminist and writer. She published both literary works and feminist tracts, founding several magazines. In 1914, just prior to the advent of World War I she and other feminists presented a petition for women's suffrage to the Romanian Parliament. In 1925, she founded the Society of Romanian Women Writers to encourage women to publish their works and the following year founded an influential journal as the publishing arm of the society which published works by both women and men on feminist topics.

== Early life ==
Adela Xenopol was born in 1861, in Iași, the capital of the Western Moldavia region, to a family of intellectuals. The family's origins were Jewish from the father's side and Greek from the mother's side. After her father was denied the right to marry the woman he had chosen, the couple ran away and boarded a ship. The fiancée was lost at sea, but Dimitrie was rescued by fishermen and put ashore in Norway or Sweden, where he spent time before moving to Constantinople. From there, Dimitrie made his way Galați, where he was converted from Protestantism to Orthodoxy and adopted the surname Csenopolu, meaning foreigner, which was later changed to Xenopol. After his arrival in Romania, Dimitrie married Maria Vasiliu, daughter of a shingle maker and became a clerk at the Prussian Consulate in Iași. The couple had six children, including Alexandru, who would become a historian; Filip, later a noted architect; Maria; Nicolae, who would develop into a statesman; Lucreția, later a secondary school teacher and the first woman admitted to the Geographical Society of Bucharest; and Adela. Xenopol was educated abroad, in Paris taking classes at the Collège de France and became one of the first women to audit courses at the Sorbonne.

== Career ==
After completing her education, Xenopol returned to Iași and began a career as a writer. Her first published work, Chestiunea femeilor (The Woman Question), was published in Femeia Română (Romanian Woman) in January 1879. The article focused on liberal feminist ideals and the elimination of legal and moral restrictions which subjugated women's rights and made the subordinate to men. In addition to feminist tracts, she published lyric pieces in the Suceava journal, Revista politică (Political Magazine, 1886) and then published Versuri și istorisiri (Lyrics and Stories) in Iași in 1888. She founded the monthly magazine Dochia in Bucharest in 1896 and then between 1896 and 1898, she served as its editor of the monthly journal Dochia, a women's rights publication. Xenopol solicited articles from leading cultural figures including Maria Cunțan, Smaranda Gheorghiu, Cornelia Kernbach, Cincinat Pavelescu, Elena Sevastos, Vasile Urechia, among others to provoke debate on women's place in society. She supported emancipation in economic, intellectual, legal and political spheres.

Xenopol published Între sfinți. Comedie într'un act (Among Saints. A comedy in one act) in 1902 in Iași and the following year, Spre lumină (To the light) in Bucharest. Between 1905 and 1906, she edited Românca (The Romanian Woman) in Bucharest and in 1910, published in Paris a collection of works in French, Comédies. Tableaux de la vie roumaine (Comedies. Short stories of Romanian life). The collection included the stories "Un conflict céleste" (A heavenly conflict); "Aux Eaux" (To the Waters); "La Boite aux Lettres" (The Box of Letters); "Le Poète" (The Poet); "Entre Artistes" (Between Artists); "Le Revenant" (The Ghost); "La Fille aux Mains d'Ouate" (The Girl with Hands of Wadding); "Le Trésor" (The Treasure); "Bois, pourquoi te Balancer?" (Wood, why Balance?); "Romance"; and "Paroles et Musique" (Lyrics and Music). Another French work published in 1910 in Geneva was Education et religion. Essai sur l'origine du Christianisme (Education and religion. Essay on the origin of Christianity).

Between 1912 and 1916, Xenopol edited Viitorul româncelor (The Future of Romanian Women). In 1913, she published the historical novel Pe urma războiului Roman (After the Roman War) and in 1914 she led a group of other feminists in presenting a petition to the Romanian Parliament requesting women's suffrage. As the women were aware their concerns would be opposed by those politicians who felt women were unprepared to be active participants in society, the petition tempered their demand, asking for the right to vote for intellectual women and apply to local elections. Due to concerns over World War I, politicians did not take the petition seriously. Though she supported the participation of Romania in the war as a nationalist, she favored pacifism and throughout the war, spoke against conquest and in favor of equal rights citizens as a way to achieve peace.

Xenopol published her second historical novel, Uragan in 1922. In 1925, she founded the Society of Romanian Women Writers (Romanian: Societatea Scriitoarelor Române), as an organization to encourage women to publish their works. The following year, she founded a journal for the society, Revista scriitoarei (The Woman Writer's Journal) and served as the editor-in-chief through 1928. The journal featured portraits of prominent feminists like Maria Baiulescu, Alexandrina Cantacuzino, Elena Văcărescu and published works by prominent male literary figures, as well as women. Some of the women who wrote for the journal included Constanța Hodoș, Mărgărita Miller-Verghy, Sofia Nădejde, Hortensia Papadat-Bengescu, and Izabela Sadoveanu-Evan, among others. She published Prin Cetatea Carpaților (Through the Carpathian Fortress) in Bucharest in 1928 with the Royal Court Press.

== Death and legacy ==
Xenopol died on 10 May 1939 and with her death, the Romanian feminist and democratic movements lost one of their most ardent proponents.
