= Societatea Ortodoxă Națională a Femeilor Române =

Romanian organisation for women's rights

Societatea Ortodoxă Națională a Femeilor Române (SONFR) was a Romanian organisation for women's rights, founded in 1910. It was one of the three largest women's rights organizations in Romania, alongside Liga Drepturile si Datoriile Femeii and Liga Femeilor Române. It was an organization for conservative women.
