= Elena Meissner =

Romanian feminist and suffragist

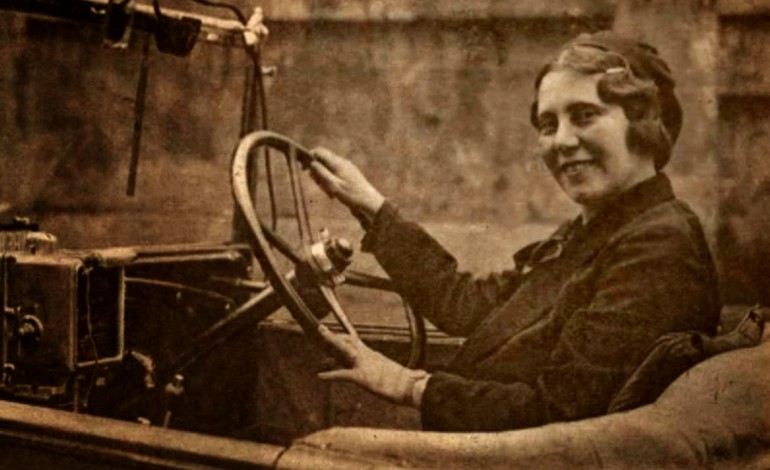
- Born: 1867; Huși, Principality of Romania
- Died: 1940 (aged 72–73)

Elena Meissner also called Elena Buznea-Meissner, (born Elena Buznea; 1867–1940) was a Romanian feminist and suffragist. She was the co-founder of the Romanian women's movement organisation Asociația de Emancipare Civilă și Politică a Femeii Române (1918) and its president in 1919.

== Life ==
Meissner was born in 1867 in Huși, the former capital of the disbanded Fălciu County in the historical region of Western Moldavia. She was one of the first female students to attend the University of Iași in the 1880s. In 1905 she married politician Constantin Meissner (1854–1942).

In 1918, she co-founded the Asociația de Emancipare Civilă și Politică a Femeii Române alongside Maria Baiulescu, Ella Negruzzi, Calypso Botez, Ana Conta-Kernbach, Izabela Sadoveanu, Ortansa Satmary and Olga Sturdza. She participated in several international women suffrage congresses as delegate of Romania.
