= Liga Femeilor Române =

Romanian women's rights organization

Liga Femeilor Române (The Romanian Women's League, The League of the Romanian Women, or only Women's League) was a Romanian organisation for women's rights, founded in 1894. It was the first nationwide women's rights organisation in Romania.

It was founded by Cornelia Emilian, Eugenia de Reuss Ianculescu and Sofia Nădejde. Its origin lay in the local women's organisation Reuniunea Femeilor Romane in Iași. While there had been local women's organisations in Romania before, this was the first long term and national women's organisation with written statues and a firm organisation, and the starting point of an organized women's movement in Romania. Its purpose was to work for women's elevation from legal incompetence and minority to a level of political, economic and educational elevation in society, and refuted the idea that men and women where to have different roles in society. It published Buletinul Ligii femeilor ('The Bulletin of the Women's League'). In 1896, it petitioned the parliament in the issue of paternity rights and women's right to manage their own property.

It was followed by the suffrage organisation Asoiatat Drepturile Femeii in 1911 (renamed Liga Drepturile si Datoriile Femeii (League for Women's Rights and Duties) in 1913–1938). It was a member of the International Alliance of Women.
