= Yizhivtsi =

Village in Chernivtsi Oblast, Ukraine

Yizhivtsi Їжівці Igești
- Village
- Interactive map of Yizhivtsi
- Location within Ukraine Location within Chernivtsi Oblast
- Coordinates: 48°02′14″N 25°39′10″E
- Country: Ukraine
- Oblast: Chernivtsi Oblast
- Raion: Chernivtsi
- Hromada: Chudei rural hromada

Yizhivtsi (Ukrainian: Їжівці; Romanian: Igești; German: Idzestie [until 1918, then German: Jizhiwzi]) is a village in Chernivtsi Raion, Chernivtsi Oblast, Ukraine. It belongs to Chudei rural hromada, one of the hromadas of Ukraine. Yizhivts

Until 18 July 2020, Yizhivtsi belonged to Storozhynets Raion. The raion was abolished in July 2020 as part of the administrative reform of Ukraine, which reduced the number of raions of Chernivtsi Oblast to three. The area of Storozhynets Raion was merged into Chernivtsi Raion. In 2001, 97.75% of the inhabitants spoke Romanian as their native language, while 1.51% spoke Ukrainian.

== Natives ==
- Vasile Chiseliță (born 1954), Moldovan ethnomusicologist and researcher
- Eugenia de Reuss Ianculescu (1866–1938), Romanian teacher, writer, and women's rights activist
