= Cercetașii României =

National Scouting organization of Romania

- Romanian Scouts
- Country: Romania
- Founded: 1913/1991
- Membership: 3,500
- Affiliation: World Organization of the Scout Movement
- Website www.scout.ro

Cercetașii României (Romanian for "Romania's Scouts" or "Romanian Scouts"; in full Organizația Națională Cercetașii României - "National Organization of Romanian Scouts") is the primary national Scouting organization of Romania. Founded in 1913, it became a member of the World Organization of the Scout Movement (WOSM) in 1993.

The coeducational Cercetașii României has 3,500 members as of 2014.

== History ==
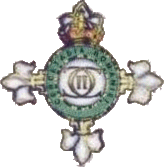

Romania was a founding member of the WOSM, having formally had Scouts between 1913 and 1937. Influenced by reading Baden-Powell's "Scouting for Boys", the first informal patrol of Boy Scouts was established in Romania in 1913 at Gheorghe Lazăr High School by Dimitrie Dimăncescu, his brother, Ioan, and classmates. Prince Carol would become the first formal troop leader. Others joined in broadening awareness of the Scout movement (Gheorghe Munteanu-Murgoci, Alexandru Borza, Vladimir Ghidionescu, Constantin Costa-Foru, Nicolae Iorga, Ion G. Duca and Colonel Grigore Berindei) who became familiar with the Scout movements in the United Kingdom, France, Belgium, and Germany.

The translation of Baden-Powell's book Scouting for Boys into Romanian was published in 1915. That same year saw the official founding of the Cercetaşii României; on the occasion, Lord Baden-Powell sent a message of congratulations, with the admonition that Scouting should be adapted to the local situation. Membership grew quickly across Romania.

During World War I, Romanian Scouts were very active in defense activities. Ecaterina Teodoroiu guided a patrol of Scouts and Guides and was employed as a nurse, before joining the Romanian Army and dying a heroine. Many Scouts who helped the transporting of the wounded were killed during the air attacks. On September 29, 1916, Baden-Powell sent a message expressing regret to the Scouts for the death of their fellows. At the end of the war, the Boy Scouts marched in the front of the Victory Train, under the Triumphal Arch in Bucharest.

In 1920, 67 Romanian Boy Scouts and their leaders were present at the first World Jamboree in London, England. Before World War II, the Scout Movement developed further: many patrols were formed in towns and in villages, many camps, socials, expeditions and spectacles were organized, and a great number of magazines, literary writings and pedagogical studies were published for Scouts and their Chiefs. At the time, one of the devoted Boy Scouts was the philosopher Mircea Eliade.

In 1930, the first Romanian Scout Jamboree took place, in the presence of Hubert Martin and many delegations of Scouts and Guides from other countries. Cercetașii României had 45,000 members at that point, and the Guides Movement had 14,000. The organizer and Chief of the Guides Movement was Princess Ileana, the daughter of Queen Marie.

With the growing influenced of fascism in the 1930s, Romanian Scouting officially preserved its apolitical character, only to be replaced in 1937 by a totalitarian organization, Străjeria (Straja Țării), as part of the dictatorial measures initiated by King Carol II (alongside the creation of the National Renaissance Front). Straja Țării withdrew from the International Scout Conference the same year. John S. Wilson signed and agreement in March 1939 of interchange of visits and permit the Straja Țării participate in Scout Conferences as observers and to attend courses at Gilwell Park but subsequent events cancelled this agreement.

After World War II, there were attempts to restore the Scout Movement in Romania, but the emergence of the communist regime brought a ban on all alternative youth movements, replaced by the Pioneer Organization and Union of Communist Youth.

After the Revolution of 1989, former Scouts and others acted for the revival of Scouting in Romania. Cercetașii României was again established in 1991, and in 1993 gained recognition by the World Bureau of the WOSM. But in 2006, there are only 2,000 registered Scouts.

== Program and ideals ==
- Lupișori: Wolf Cubs-7 to 10
- Temerari: Pioneers/Scouts-12 to 14
- Exploratori: Explorers/Venturers-15 to 18
- Seniori: Seniors/Rovers-18 to 24
- Lideri: Leaders-24+

The Scout Motto is Gata Oricând, translated as Always Ready in English; the Romanian noun for a single Scout is Cercetaș.

The membership badge of Cercetașii României features stylized fir branches.

=== Scout Oath ===
Promit pe onoarea mea să fac tot ce este posibil pentru: a servi patria mea România și credința mea, a ajuta pe aproapele meu în orice moment, a mă supune Legii Cercetașului.

I promise on my honour to do all that is in my power in order to: Serve my country, Romania, and my belief, Help my fellow man in any moment, Respect the Scout Law.

=== Scout Law ===
Cercetașul își iubește patria sa, România și pe toți cei care trăiesc in ea
Cercetașul este loial, își respectă cuvântul dat, nu minte, este curat în gând, în vorbă și în faptă
Cercetașul este util și își ajută semenii în orice situație, este un prieten pentru toți și frate cu toți Cercetașii
Cercetașul este econom și cumpătat, este îngăduitor cu alții și sever cu sine, își îngrijește corpul și duce o viață sănătoasă
Cercetașul iubește și ocrotește natura și este bun cu animalele
Cercetașul își respectă și ascultă părinții, șefii si profesorii și este disciplinat în tot ceea ce face
Cercetașul este credincios şi respectă credinţa celorlalţi
Cercetașul este curajos și încrezător în puterile sale, vioi și plin de însuflețire
Cercetașul se străduiește să facă în fiecare zi o faptă bună, oricât de neînsemnată ar părea ea

The Scout loves his country, Romania and all the people who live in it
A Scout is loyal, trustworthy, he never lies; his mind and actions are clean
A Scout makes himself useful; he helps others in any situation; he is every ones friend and the brother of all the Scouts
A Scout is thoughtful and moderate, he is tolerant with others and severe with himself, he takes care of his body and leads a healthy life
A Scout loves and protects the nature and he is good to animals
A Scout loves and obeys his parents, his chiefs and his teachers and he is disciplined in everything he does
A Scout is faithful and he respects other's faith/religion
A Scout is courageous and he trusts his own powers; he is joyful and full of life
A Scout likes to study and he teaches others
A Scout strives to do a good deed every day, however small it might seem

== See also ==
- Scouting in Romania
- Organizația Națională a Scouților din Moldova
- Asociația Ghidelor și Ghizilor din România, a girls & women-focused branch
- Hungarian Scout Association in Romania
