= Liga Drepturilor și Datoriilor Femeilor =

Romanian organisation for women's rights

Liga Drepturilor și Datoriilor Femeilor ('League for Women's Rights and Duties') was a Romanian organisation for women's rights, founded in 1911. It was the first women's suffrage organisation in Romania.

It was founded by Eugenia de Reuss Ianculescu. Its origin lay in the Liga Femeilor Române. Originally named Asociația Drepturile Femeii, it changed name in 1913 to Liga Drepturilor și Datoriilor Femeilor. While earlier women's rights organisations had worked for women suffrage, it was the first organisation to focus on women suffrage. It was one of the three major women's rights organisations in Romania, alongside Liga Femeilor Române and Societatea Ortodoxă Națională a Femeilor Române. It was a member of the International Alliance of Women.
