= Ștefan Emilian =

Romanian architect (1819–1899)

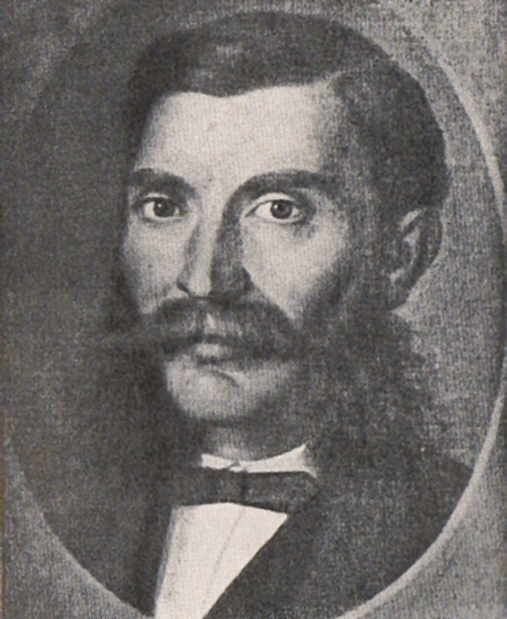
Ștefan Emilian (portrait by Mișu Popp)

Ștefan Emilian (August 8, 1819 – November 1899) was an Imperial Austrian-born Romanian mathematician and architect.

Born in Bonchida, Kolozs County (now Bonțida, Cluj County), in the Principality of Transylvania, he was given the surname Kertész as a child, although his birth name was Emilian. He attended high school in Sibiu. Then, from 1841 to 1845, he studied at the Academy of Fine Arts Vienna, graduating with an architect's degree. Additionally, from 1841 to 1843, he took courses at the Vienna Polytechnic Institute. Emilian returned home shortly before 1848, in time for the Transylvanian Revolution. Pursued by the authorities, he sought refuge in Wallachia. By 1850, he was back in Transylvania, where he taught mathematics at Brașov's Greek Orthodox High School. He remained there until 1858, a period during which he designed the new school building. Additionally, he was the architect for the first paper factory in Zărnești.

In 1858, he was invited to Iași, the capital of Moldavia, in order to teach drawing and geometry to the upper classes of Academia Mihăileană. Emilian remained there for two years, until the founding of the University of Iași. Additionally, he taught at the military officers' school and the technical school of arts and professions. At the new university, he was named full professor of descriptive geometry and linear perspective, remaining from October 1860 to October 1892, when he had to retire. Meanwhile, he designed the Iași anatomy institute, the Lipovan Church, and the church in Bosia. A single published book of his is known: the 1886 Curs practic de perspectivă liniară. Emilian's funeral eulogy was delivered by Alexandru Dimitrie Xenopol.

He married Cornelia Ederlly de Medve.
