= Hungarian Scout Association in Romania =

Romániai Magyar Cserkészszövetség
- Headquarters: Miercurea Ciuc, Romania
- Country: Romania
- Founded: 1990
- Executive manager: Sándor Gaál
- Website; Website of the Hungarian Scout Association in Romania

The Hungarian Scout Association in Romania (Hungarian: Romániai Magyar Cserkészszövetség, RMCSSZ) is the Scouting organization of the Hungarians in Romania. Currently, there are 134 Scout groups, of which 107 are active.

== History of Hungarian Scouting in Transylvania ==
The first Scout troops in Transylvania were founded shortly after the first troops in Budapest were formed. They were part of the Hungarian Scout Association (Magyar Cserkészszövetség), because the region was a part of the Kingdom of Hungary until the end of World War I.

The first Transylvanian Scout group was formed in the Reformed Church College of Székelyudvarhely (Romanian: Odorheiu Secuiesc) in 1911, under the leadership of PE teacher Z. Sebess József. Three years later, 84 Scouts already took part in the activity of the group. In the meantime, new groups were formed in the Technical Highschool of Székelyudvarhely, in the Reformed Church College of Marosvásárhely (Romanian: Târgu Mureș), in the Reformed Church College of Kolozsvár (Romanian: Cluj-Napoca), and also in the Roman Catholic Grammar School in Gyulafehérvár (Romanian: Alba Iulia). World War I disintegrated these initiatives.

After the Treaty of Trianon, Transylvania became a part of Romania, so Hungarian Scout troops lost their membership within the Hungarian Scout Association and had to join the National Organization of Romanian Scouts. Hungarian Scouting in Transylvania was restarted in 1922-23, the organizational operation was in the frame-work of the Romanian Scout movement. In 1929, the first post-World War I Scout congress was held in Romania, and also the second country-wide Jamboree in Bucharest. In 1938, King Carol II of Romania, who had earlier been a Scout himself, put the Constitution out of effect, banned democratic parties and organizations, among them the "pro-English" Scouting.

As from the re-attachment of Northern Transylvania to Hungary in 1940 until the end of World War II, Scouting could operate without difficulties as a part of the Hungarian Scout Association and Association of Hungarian Girl Guides (Magyar Cserkészlány Szövetség).

After 1945, Northern Transylvania was returned to Romania, and in the period from 1945 to 1948, all Hungarian activities were suppressed. In 1948, the communist authorities banned Scouting in Romania.

After the fall of the communist dictatorship in Romania, the Hungarian Scout Association in Romania was formed in 1990.

The revival of Scouting in Romania took place by the formation of separate Hungarian and Romanian groups. The first Hungarian Scout groups were formed during a camp in August, 1990 and also the Hungarian Scout Association in Romania (Romániai Magyar Cserkészszövetség) was founded in that year. The National Organization of Romanian Scouts was formed together with the Romanian Scouts and this organization gained recognition by the World Bureau of the WOSM in 1993.

The relationship between the Hungarian and Romanian Scouting organization has been problematic. In the 1990s, even legal proceedings were brought against the Hungarian Scout Association in Romania. In practice, Hungarian and Romanian Scouting in Romania work separately, and this is de facto accepted by the WOSM, however, on the formal side, it recognizes only one Scout organisation in the country. Therefore, a tacit understanding on co-existence was worked out in 1995 which seems to be a viable modus vivendi. The Hungarian Scout Association in Romania is also a member of the 'International Forum of Hungarian Scouting' and has strong ties to the Hungarian Scout Association.
