= Calypso Botez =

Romanian writer (1880–1933)

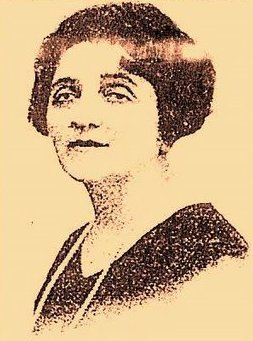
- Born: 1880
- Died: 1933 (aged 52–53)

Calypso Botez (1880–1933), was a Romanian writer, suffragist and women's rights activist.

== Life ==
Botez was born in 1880 in Bacău. She graduated from the University of Iasi. Botez then lived in Bucharest where she taught at a secondary school although she was also inspecting other schools. She became the President of the Red Cross in Galati. In 1917 she was a co-founder, with Maria Baiulescu, Ella Negruzzi and Elena Meissner, of Asociația de Emancipare Civilă și Politică a Femeii Române or the Romanian Women's Union (UFR).

She wrote about women's rights highlighting that the Romanian constitution's first article held that all citizens were equal. In 1919 she published The Problem of the Rights of the Romanian Woman. She campaigned for reform of the powers of the government, women's rights and divorce law reform. In 1920 she published The Problem of Feminism. A Systematization of Its Elements. She co-founded the Consiliul Naţional al Femeilor Române in 1921.

== Other works ==
- Women's Rights in the Future Constitution (1922)
- Women's Rights in the Future of the Civil Code (1924)
- Report on the Legal Situation of Women (1932)
