= Gheorghe Kernbach =

Romanian poet (1863–1909)

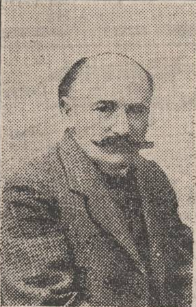
Photo of Gheorghe Kernbach published on page 1 of issue 2359 of the Dimineata newspaper of September 25, 1910 (s.v.)

Gheorghe Kernbach (January 10, 1863 – September 20, 1909), pen name Gheorghe din Moldova, was a Romanian poet.

Born in Botoșani, he attended primary and secondary school in his native town, followed by the law faculty of the University of Bucharest, from which he graduated in 1884. He also studied statistics in Rome. He was a magistrate, chief editor of Liberalul newspaper in Iași, and prefect of Botoșani and Iași counties. As of 1907, he belonged to the owners' association of Viața Românească magazine, where he also worked as editor. His first work appeared in Albina magazine, which later became Albina Botoșanilor. He also contributed to Emanciparea, Contemporanul, Revista nouă and Viața Românească; his verses in the latter were sometimes signed Ignotus or Victor C. Rareș. His poems, collected in 1894 as Poezii, are delicate elegies or erotic jokes. They display an inclination toward gnomic expression, and delight in folkloric stylizations. Well-received in his day, and received enthusiastically by Bogdan Petriceicu Hasdeu, his work was collected posthumously in 1912 by Garabet Ibrăileanu, as Versuri și proză. A later critic noted that, although his poems are primarily influence by the lyric verse of Mihail Eminescu, they are weak in emotional range and lack profundity.

His wife was Ana Conta-Kernbach, the sister of Vasile Conta and a noted pedagogue; the couple married in 1891.
