= Ștefania Mihăilescu =

Romanian historian and women's studies academic

Ștefania Mihăilescu (also Ștefania Gáll Mihăilescu, born 1938) was a Romanian historian whose work was foundational for the development of women's studies in the country. Her anthologies were awarded the prize for research on the Romanian women's rights movement in 2006.

== Early life and education ==
Ștefania Gáll Mihăilescu was born in 1938 in Oradea, in the Kingdom of Romania. She earned a PhD in history.

== Career ==
When Mihaela Miroiu founded the gender studies master's degree program in 1998 at the National University of Political Studies and Public Administration, she acquired grants from the European Union and the United Nations along with other organizations to support research and publications for the department. As part of that initiative, Mihăilescu began collecting and compiling documentation of women's movements in Romania. In 2002, she was serving as an associate professor at the National University of Political Studies and Public Administration teaching the history of Romanian feminism in the masters program of gender studies. Her anthologies were recognized at the symposium "Women's Interests: Dignity, Autonomy, Self-affirmation" held in October 2006 with the prize for research on the Romanian women's rights movement.

== Research ==
Academic Maria Bucur notes that Mihăilescu's The Emancipation of the Romanian Woman: Study and Anthology of Texts (in two volumes) were pioneering publications for the development of the history of feminism and women in Romania. The massive volumes chronicled women's activism, including a bibliography of works and names of participants from 1815 through 1948. Despite this, Bucur criticized Mihăilescu for rejecting inclusion in the documents selected, works by persons who produced scholarly publications during the communist regime. More problematic to Bucur was the depiction of a pro-democratic spirit among Romanian women of the interwar period, when evidence clearly showed that there were fissures between ethnic Romanians and Germans, Hungarians, and Jews as well as other ethnic minorities and that women activists were contrary, behaving inclusively when it was beneficial and at other times behaving in xenophobic or anti-Semitic ways when separation between themselves and others was desired.

Roxana Cheșchebec also characterizes Mihăilescu's work in the Emancipation Anthologies and the two volumes of Din istoria feminismului românesc (From the History of Romanian Feminism) as being the most influential works on the feminist movement in Romania. Mihailescu took 1815, the year that women first organized in Buda, as the starting point of her work and followed the changes in the women's movement caused by modernization, documenting the shift from philanthropic and cultural efforts towards political goals. Cheşchebec noted that Mihăilescu's analysis spurred other academics, like Bucur and Miroiu, creator of the first graduate program of gender studies in Bucharest, to expand the knowledge feminist history. Later gender scholars such as Oana Băluță and Krassimira Daskalova working in the twenty-first century have acknowledged Mihăilescu's work on feminism throughout the nineteenth and twentieth centuries as a fundamental starting point.

== Selected works ==
- Mihaĭlescu, Ștefania Gáll (1996–1997). Transilvania în lupta de idei: controverse in Austro-Ungaria privind statutul Transilvaniei [Transylvania in the Struggle of Ideas: Controversies in Austria-Hungary Regarding the Status of Transylvania] (in Romanian). București: Silex Publishing House. ISBN 978-973-97037-5-8.
- Mihăilescu, Ştefania (2001). Emanciparea femeii române: antologie de texte, 1815-1918 [The emancipation of the Romanian woman: Study and anthology of texts, 1815-1918] (in Romanian). Vol. one. București: Editura Ecumenica. ISBN 978-973-99782-1-7.
- Mihăilescu, Ştefania (2002). Din istoria feminismului românesc: antologie de texte (1838-1929) [From the History of Romanian Feminism: Anthology of Texts, 1838–1929] (PDF). Studii de gen (in Romanian). Iași: Polirom. ISBN 978-973-681-012-1. Archived (PDF) from the original on 5 April 2022.
- Mihăilescu, Ştefania (2004). Emanciparea femeii române: antologie de texte, 1919-1948 [The emancipation of the Romanian woman: Study and anthology of texts, 1919-1948] (in Romanian). Vol. two. București: Editura Ecumenica. ISBN 978-973-99782-2-4.
- Mihăilescu, Ștefania Gáll (2006). Din istoria feminismului românesc: studiu și antologie de texte (1929–1948) [From the History of Romanian Feminism: Anthology of Texts, 1929-1948] (in Romanian). București: Polirom. ISBN 978-973-46-0348-0.
