= Ella Negruzzi =

Romanian lawyer and women's rights activist

- Born: 9 September 1876; Hermeziu, Romania
- Died: 19 December 1948 (aged 72); Bucharest, Romania
- Occupations: Lawyer, women's rights activist

Ella Negruzzi (1876–1948) was a Romanian lawyer and women's rights activist, and the first female lawyer in Romania (1913). She was a co-founder of the women's organization Association for the Civil and Political Emancipation of Romanian Women (1917), the Group of Democratic Lawyers (1935) and the Women's Front (1936).

== Early life ==
Ella Negruzzi was born on 11 September 1876 in Hermeziu, in the Moldavia Region of the recently formed country of Romania. Though her mother's identity is unknown, she grew up in a household of prominent men. Her father was the writer Leon C. Negruzzi; her uncle, Iacob Negruzzi was also a writer and twice served as president of the Romanian Academy; and her grandfather Constantin Negruzzi at one time served as the mayor of Iași. Her brother, Mihai (ro), would become a general in the Romanian army. Negruzzi attended primary school in Iași and went on to complete her secondary education at the Externatul Girls school, (now known as Mihai Eminescu College).

Negruzzi's father died when she was a teenager and her uncle, Iacob took over the responsibility for ensuring that she and Mihai completed their education. She continued her education, at the University of Iaşi, studying history, law and philosophy. In 1913, she became the first woman to try to register for the bar examination in Iaşi. The request was rejected on the basis that women were not permitted to be public participants and were barred specifically from practicing law. Negruzzi moved to Galaţi to make a second attempt. She secured the support of Corneliu Botez, a prominent local attorney, but was also rejected. In 1917, she and other feminists, including Elena Meissner, submitted a petition to the Senate demanding civil and political rights for women, but it was rejected. The following year, she was one of the co-founders of the Association for the Civil and Political Emancipation of Romanian Women (Romanian: Asociafia pentru emanciparea civild si politicd a femeilor romane (AECPFR)). The association platform pressed for the right of women to participate in civil society, including access to education, employment, and politics. In 1919, she made her third attempt to take the bar examination, applying in Ilfov County at Bucharest and was finally allowed to take the exam. Six years after her first attempt, in 1920, Negruzzi became the first woman allowed to practice law in Romania.

== Career ==
After receiving her credentials, Negruzzi began practicing law in Galaţi and later moved to Bucharest. She continued her feminist activities, and in the interwar period, she and Meissner were the principal leaders of AECPFR. She became a prolific writer, touching on issues that limited women's participation, like their limited ability to obtain jobs and the restrictions which made them the most likely to be fired, if they did secure work. She worked to establish networks of vocational schools and worker cooperatives in rural areas to expand opportunities for women's employment. She also argued for the education and rehabilitation of prostitutes, rather than their social scorn. During the period leading to the adoption of the 1923 Constitution of Romania, worked tirelessly for women to be recognized as political actors. The changes women sought were somewhat successful and in Negruzzi joined the National Peasants' Party. In 1929, when women were allowed to participate in local elections as candidates for the first time, she ran for office in Bucharest. Along with Calypso Botez and Alexandrina Cantacuzino, Negruzzi became one of the first six women elected to serve as city council members.

During the worldwide Great Depression of the 1930s, the Constitution changed again in 1932 to grant women nearly equal civil status as men, but at the same time, the government began a campaign to limit women's ability to work or receive social benefits. As the Nazis rose to power in Germany, Negruzzi spoke out against war and was an active anti-fascist. She helped found the Group of Democratic Lawyers (Romanian: Grupul avocaţilor democraţi) in 1935, to fight against the spread of fascism. In 1936, Negruzzi founded the organization Women's Front (Romanian: Frontul feminin), to train women in organizing to defend their cultural, socio-economic and political rights. Negruzzi became the target of numerous death threats for her defense of Ana Pauker. When King Carol II's regime evolved into a dictatorship and he forced the closure of AECPFR, she was forced to retreat from public participation, but refused to cooperate with his policies.

== Death and legacy ==
Negruzzi died on 19 December 1948 in Bucharest. She was remembered for her prominent role in establishing women's rights in Romania.

== See also ==
- First women lawyers around the world
