= Săucești =

- Commune
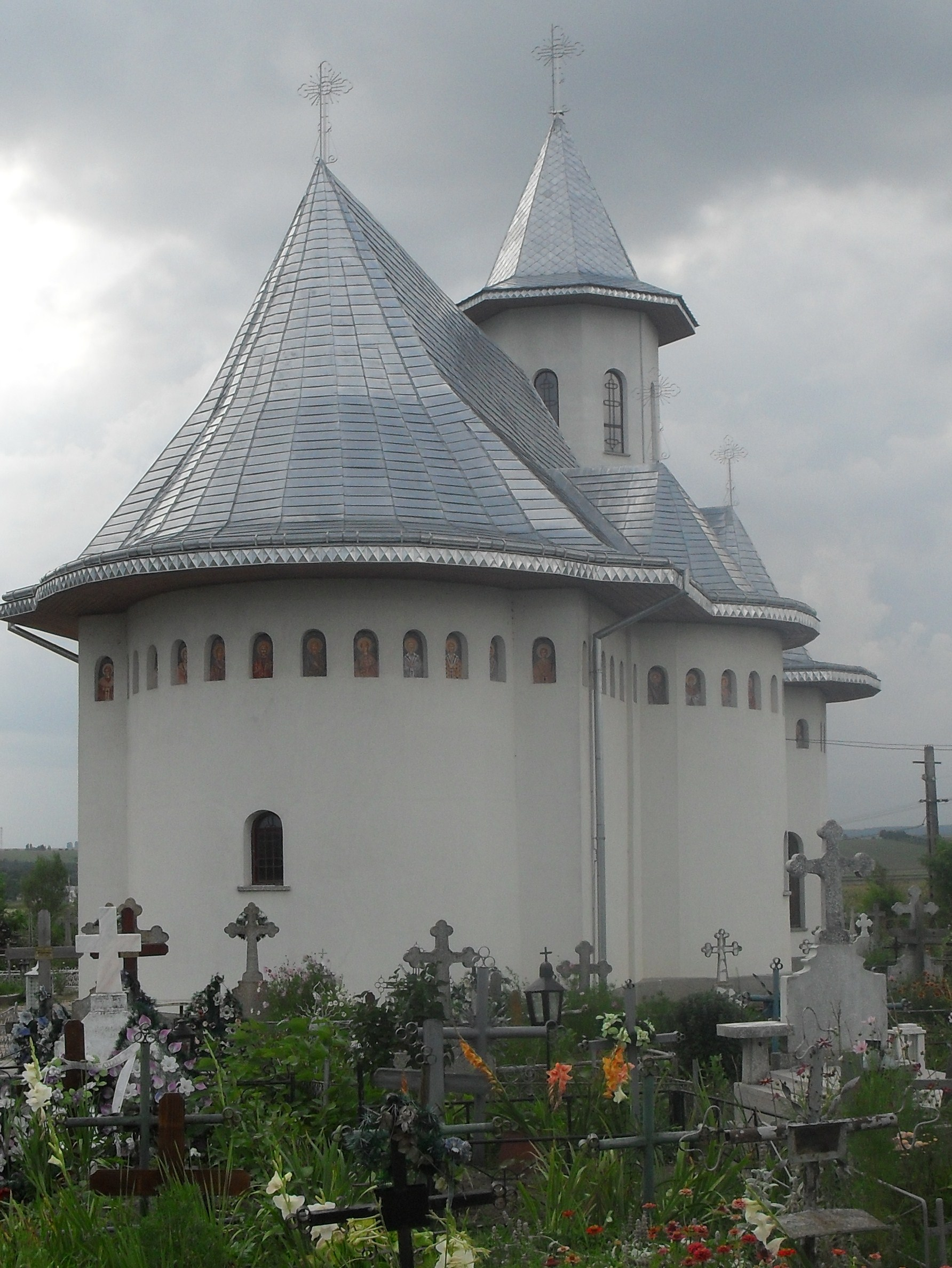
- Orthodox church in Siretu village

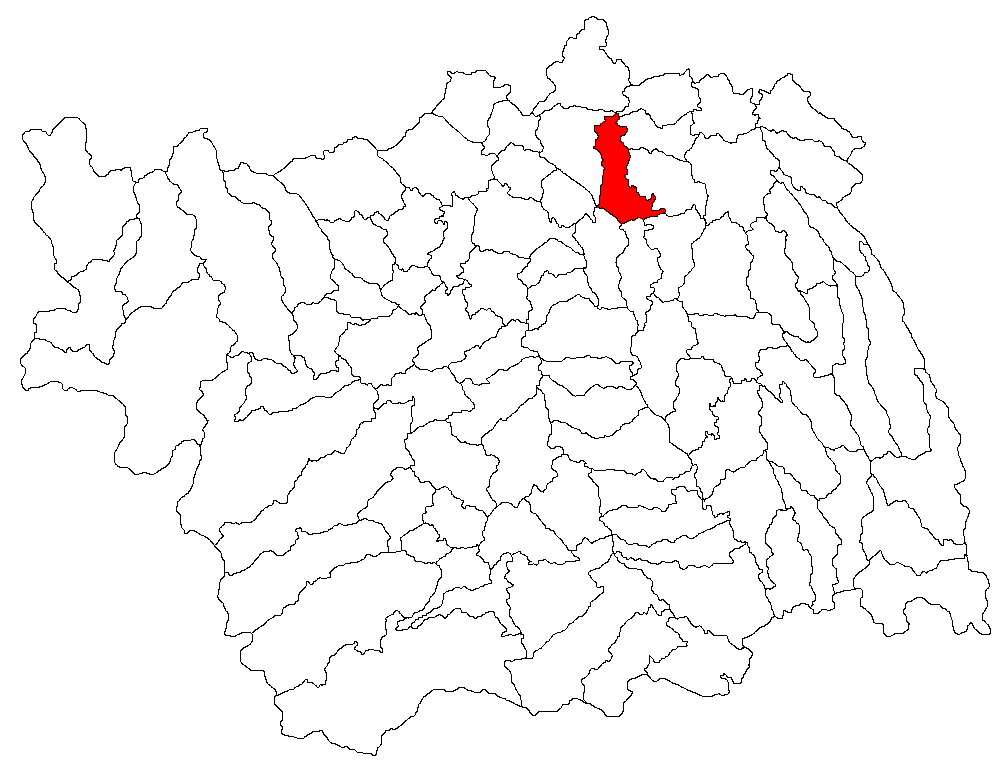
- Location in Bacău County

- Location in Romania
- Coordinates: 46°37′N 26°56′E
- Country: Romania
- County: Bacău

Government
  - Mayor (2024–2028): Valentin Manea (PSD)
- Area: 53.45 km^{2} (20.64 sq mi)
- Elevation: 256 m (840 ft)
- Population (2021-12-01): 5,386
  - Density: 100.8/km^{2} (261.0/sq mi)
- Time zone: UTC+02:00 (EET)
  - Summer (DST): UTC+03:00 (EEST)
- Postal code: 607540
- Area code: +(40) 0234
- Vehicle reg.: BC
- Website: primariasaucesti.ro

Săucești is a commune in Bacău County, Western Moldavia, Romania. It is composed of five villages: Bogdan Vodă, Săucești, Schineni, Șerbești, and Siretu.
