= Asociația Ghidelor și Ghizilor din România =

- Country: Romania
- Founded: 1928/1990
- Membership: 1,000
- Affiliation: World Association of Girl Guides and Girl Scouts
- Website aggr.ro

The Asociația Ghidelor și Ghizilor din România (AGGR) was the national Guiding organization of Romania. Guiding organizations are part the Scout Movement, originally and largely still for girls and women only. Guiding in Romania began in 1928, was restarted in 1990, and the AGGR became a member of the World Association of Girl Guides and Girl Scouts (WAGGGS) in 1993. As of 2008, the coeducational organization had 1,000 members.

== History ==
The first Romanian Guide groups were founded in 1928. The organizer and Chief of the Guides Movement was Princess Ileana, the daughter of Queen Marie. However, activities ceased in 1938 due to political constraints, and contact was lost during the royal dictatorship of Carol II, the fascist regimes which followed during WWII, and the communist regime after the war.

In 1990, after the political change in Romania, a committee was formed to restart Guiding in Romania upon the initiative of members of the Greek Soma Hellinidon Odigon. The Asociația Ghidelor și Ghizilor din România was set up in 1990 and became a corporate body on March 1, 1991. Until 1993, the association was widely supported by WAGGGS representatives and by the Greek Guides.

The AGGR became an associate member of the WAGGGS in 1993, and received full membership in 2005. While working towards full membership, the AGGR started a partnership with the Swiss Guide and Scout Movement.

The AGGR held its first national camp in summer 2006.

In 2026, AGGR officially ended its membership in WAGGGS and dissolved.

== Program and ideals ==
The AGGR's logo was the yellow trefoil.

The association was divided in five age-groups:

- Curcubeu - Rainbows (ages 5 to 7)
- Flori - Flowers (ages 7 to 11)
- Ghizi - Guides (ages 11 to 14)
- Ghizi Mari - Senior Guides (ages 14 to 18)
- Aventurieri - Adventurers (ages 18 to 25)

=== Guide Promise, Law and Motto ===
A) Guide Law:

1. Voi respecta întotdeauna adevărul pentru a fi o persoană de onoare;

1. I will always respect the truth in order to be an honourable person;

1. Îmi voi asuma responsabilități în comunitatea în care traiesc;

1. I will take responsibilities in the community I live in;

1. Voi înfrunta dificultățile cu optimism;

1. I will face the difficulties with optimism;

1. Voi avea încredere în mine și îi voi respecta pe ceilalți;

1. I will be self-confident and respect the others;

1. Îi voi ajuta pe ceilalți și voi fi prietena/ul tuturor;

1. I will help the others and be everybody’s friend;

1. Voi proteja mereu natura și viața.

1. I will protect life and nature.

B) Guide Promise: Promit din tot sufletul să slujesc pe Dumnezeu*, să-mi servesc țara și să respect legea ghizilor“. (*în funcție de confesiunea religioasă). The Guide Motto (Mottoul Ghizilor) is "Fii pregătit/ă" (Be prepared).

=== Flower Promise, Law and Motto ===
Flower Promise

Promit din tot sufletul să fiu credincioasă lui Dumnezeu și țării, să ajut pe cei din jurul meu și să respect Legea Florilor.
I heartily promise to be faithful to God and my country, to help my fellow men and to observe the Flower Law.

Flower Law

O Floare este veselă și ascultătoare, nu se gândește numai la ea și îi iubește pe ceilalți.
A Flower is cheerful and listens well, she doesn't think only of herself, and loves others.

The Flower Motto is "Dă mâna!" (Lend a hand).

== See also ==
- Scouting in Romania
- Cercetașii României ("Romanian Scouts"), the Romanian national scouting organization
- Organizația Națională a Scouților din Moldova
