= Cornelia Emilian =

Cornelia Emilian (née Ederlly de Medve; 1840–1910) was an Imperial Austrian-born Romanian journalist and women's rights activist.

She was born in Zlatna, in the Principality of Transylvania, to a noble family. In 1858, she emigrated to Iași, the capital of Moldavia, soon to become the second city of the Romanian Old Kingdom. There, she married Ștefan Emilian, a professor at the University of Iași and architect.

Emilian founded the Romanian Women's Congress. During the Romanian War of Independence, she worked as a nurse and mobilized other women to assist in the war effort. She created a school meal program for poor children. In 1894, she started the Women's League.

A journalist who wrote in order to advocate for women's emancipation and their rights, her work appeared in Revista literară, Fântâna Blanduziei, Literatorul, Revista poporului and Familia. Emilian's daughter, Cornelia Emilian Sevastos, also participated in the League, where she continued her mother's activities.
