= Constanța Hodoș =

Austrian Empire-born Romanian novelist, playwright and opinion journalist

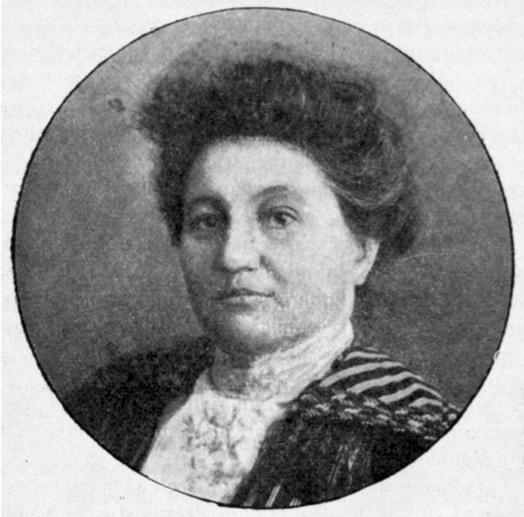
Photograph of Constanța Hodoş

Constanța Hodoș (October 12, 1860–April 20, 1934) was an Austrian Empire-born Romanian novelist, playwright and opinion journalist.

== Biography ==
Born in Zimbru, Arad County, her parents were Constantin Tălaș, a notary, deputy prefect and supporter of the 1848 revolutionaries in the Țara Zarandului area; and his wife Amalia. Her childhood was spent at Aciua, Hălmagiu and Baia de Criș; a graduate of the Romanian girls' school in Hălmagiu, she also took private lessons. Nevertheless, Hodoș, a precocious and voracious reader of literature, was largely self-taught. She married writer Alexandru I. Hodoș, but the union proved a failure, prompting her to move to Bucharest, capital of the Romanian Old Kingdom, in 1886. There, she undertook sustained publishing activity, penning articles on patriotic, social and cultural themes. She edited Revista noastră from 1905 to 1916, and also contributed to Adevărul literar și artistic, Dacia Traiană, Luceafărul, Lumea ilustrată, Minerva, Revista scriitoarei, Sămănătorul, Sibiul literar, Telegraful român, Transilvania, Universul, Vieața and Viața literară.

Her writing debut came in Familia in 1891, under the pseudonym Th. Costan. Using the same name, she published her first volume, the novella Aur!, in 1893. Subsequently, she wrote the short prose volumes Spre fericire (1897), Frumos (1905), Departe de lume (1909) and Aci, pe pământ (1914), as well as the novel Martirii (1908). Her plays included Aur! (1903), Mântuirea (1920) and Judecătorul (1922); these were staged at the National Theatre Bucharest, as well as by amateur troupes in her native Transylvania. Hodoș also wrote plays and stories for children: Teatru de copii (1914), Rodica. În vârtejul războiului (1921) and Povestiri din viața copiilor (1928). She was a member of the governing committee of the Romanian Writers' Society, and in 1910 was awarded the Bene Merenti medal, first class.
