= Scouting and Guiding in Romania =

The Scout Movement of Romania consists of several associations with slightly different aims. Among them are:

- Organizaţia Naţională Cercetaşii României (ONCR), (National Organization Scouts of Romania) member of the World Organization of the Scout Movement (WOSM), founded in 1991 with 4,927 members.
  - Asociaţia Scout Catolică din România (ASCRO), a Catholic Scout association, which is part of ONCR and linked with AGESCI, the Italian Catholic Scout and Guide Association
  - Romániai Magyar Cserkészszövetség (Hungarian Scout Association in Romania), affiliated to ONCR and member of the International Forum of Hungarian Scouting; with 107 active groups
- Asociația Ghidelor și Ghizilor din România (AGGR), (Association of Guides and Guides from Romania) belonging to the World Association of Girl Guides and Girl Scouts (WOSM), founded in 1990 with 627 members
- Asociaţia Cercetaşilor Tradiţionali din România (Association of Traditional Scouts from Romania) (ACT-RO founded in 2014), belonging to the World Federation of Independent Scouts.
- Cercetaşii Creştini Români din FSE, (Romanian Christian Scouts) belonging to the Union Internationale des Guides et Scouts d'Europe, founded in 1991 with 500 members.
- Organizația Cercetașilor din Ardeal (Organization of Transylvania Scouts), independent, 150 members.
- Asociaţia Cercetaşii Munţilor (ACM), (Mountain Scouts Association) founded in 1991 and disbanded after a few years of activity. In 1996 the association reopened and it now has 30+ years of activity and has active centers in Baia Mare, Beclean, București, Cluj-Napoca, and Timișoara.

In addition to the various Romanian groups based in Romania there are also several non Romanian Scout and Guide groups based in the country:

- Troop 900 of the Boy Scouts of America (BSA) in Bucharest. The BSA is the national scouting organisation for the USA. This troop is administered by the BSA Transatlantic Council (a BSA overseas organisation). The BSA is part of the World Organization of the Scout Movement (WOSM).
- USA Girl Scouts Overseas in Bucharest, serviced by way of the USA Girl Scouts Organisation USAGSO headquartered in New York City. The USA GSO is part of the World Association of Girl Guides and Girl Scouts (WAGGGS)
- Bucharest Girl Guides a British Guiding Overseas (BGO) unit in Bucharest and part of the Guide Association, the United Kingdom National Girl Guiding body (equivalent to Girl Scouts) which is part of the World Association of Girl Guides and Girl Scouts (WAGGGS)
- In 2022 the 1st Bucharest Scouts was formed in Bucharest. This is a British Scouting Overseas (BSO) group and is part of The Scout Association the United Kingdom national scouting body which is part of the World Organization of the Scout Movement (WOSM)

== Emblems ==
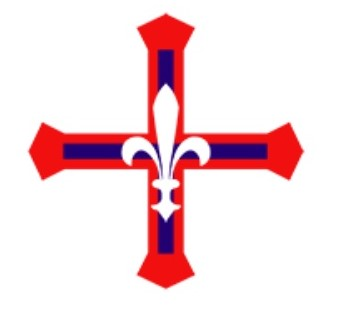
Asociaţia Cercetaşii Munţilor (ACM). Mountaineer Scouts.

== Pioneer movements of the past ==
- During the Communist period in Romania, the Pioneer movement Pionierii was the only allowed youth movement.
