= Hortensia Papadat-Bengescu =

Romanian writer (1876–1955)

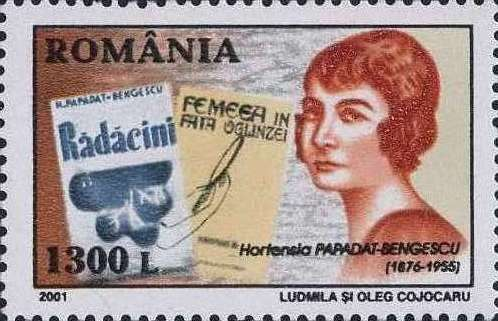

Hortensia Papadat-Bengescu (Romanian pronunciation: [horˈtensi.a papaˈdat benˈd͡ʒesku]; 8 December 1876 – 5 March 1955 in Bucharest) was a novelist of the Romanian interwar period.

== Life ==
Hortensia Bengescu was born in Ivești, Galați County, on 8 December 1876. She was the daughter of General Dimitrie Bengescu and of Zoe (born Ștefănescu). She attended high-school in Bucharest and, aged 20, she married the magistrate Nicolae Papadat but her literary career was delayed because her husband was transferred from town to town (Turnu Măgurele, Buzău, Focșani, Constanța) and because she had to take care of their four children: Nen, Zoe, Marcela and Elena. She died on 5 March 1955.

== Works ==
- Povârnișul (The Slope) – 1915;
- Ape adânci (Deep Waters) – 1919;
- Bătrânul (The Old Man) – 1920;
- Sfinxul (Sphinx) – 1920;
- Femeia în fața oglinzii (The Woman in Front of the Mirror) – 1921;
- Balaurul (The Dragon) – 1923;
- Romanță provincială (Provincial Romance) – 1925;
- Fecioarele despletite (The Disheveled Maidens) – 1926;
- Concert din muzică de Bach (A Concert of Bach's Music) – 1927;
- Desenuri tragice (Tragic Drawings) – 1927;
- Drumul ascuns (The Hidden Road) – 1933;
- Logodnicul (The Fiancé) – 1935;
- Rădăcini (Roots) – 1938;
- Teatru (Selected Plays) – 1965: Bătrânul (The Old Man), A căzut o stea (A star has fallen), Medievala, Sora mea (My Sister), Ana
