= Maria Baiulescu =

Romanian author, suffragist, Romanian nationalist and feminist leader

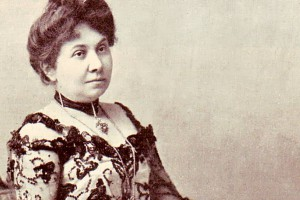
- Born: 21 August 1860; Brassó, Principality of Transylvania, Austrian Empire (modern day Brașov, Romania)
- Died: 24 June 1941 (aged 80); Brașov, Kingdom of Romania

Maria Baiulescu (21 August 1860 – 24 June 1941) was a Romanian author, suffragist, women’s rights activist, Romanian nationalist, and feminist leader.

== Life ==
She was born in Brașov in 1860. Her father, Bartolomeu Baiulescu, was a Romanian Orthodox priest, and her mother, Elena Baiulescu, was the President of the National Committee of Romanian Women. Maria Baiulescu was able to get a good education growing up and graduated from the Girls French Institution. After graduating, she then started her writing career. She began as a translator, but soon wrote for the Enciclopedia Romana. She also got to write plays for Societatea Pentru Crearea Unui Fond De Teatru Român.

In her later life, Baiulescu became a speaker and author for Asociațiunea Transilvană pentru Literatura și Cultura Poporului Român. From 1908 to 1935, she was the President of Reuniunea Femeilior Române din Brașov. During her time-serving as President, she also started another organization known as Uniunea Femeilor Române. This organization helped women come together and work on common goals. She was also able to fund a girls' orphanage to help the girls learn how to accomplish daily tasks.

She wanted women to be at the front of the Romanian national movement. Baiulescu believed that only women could preserve Romania's nation. She also improved the necessary care for young kids by giving them the basic hygiene that they needed. Maria wanted to keep the Romanian culture alive and keep distinctions between all other countries.

Baiulescu fought for women to have equal rights as men. She founded an organization known as Asociația pentru emanciparea civilă și politică a femeilor române. This association helped women practice their political rights.

She continued being involved and fighting for women's rights until she died on 24 June 1941.

== Legacy ==
A technical college in Brașov is named in her honour.
