= List of people from Iași =

This is a list of notable people from Iași, Romania. The list includes both natives and residents of the city.

== A ==
- Vasile Adamachi
- Alexandra Agiurgiuculese
- Elena Albu
- Dimitrie Alexandresco
- Călin Alupi
- Ilinca Amariei
- Jean Ancel
- Cabiria Andreian Cazacu
- Robert Asăvoaei
- George Assaky
- Abraham Axelrad
- Teodor Axinte

== B ==
- Narcis Bădic
- Octav Băncilă
- Gheorghe Bănciulescu
- Mansi Barberis
- Mădălina Bereș
- Monica Bîrlădeanu
- Ovidiu Bobîrnat
- George Bogdan
- Teodor Boldur-Lățescu
- H. Bonciu
- Octav Botez
- Gheorghe Brăescu
- Dumitru Bughici
- Simion Bughici
- Alexandru Buhuși
- Mihail Gheorghiu Bujor
- Theodor Burghele
- Nathan Burkan
- Cătălin Burlacu
- Tudor Butnariu

== C ==
- Nicolae Calimachi-Catargiu
- Ottoi Călin
- Gheorghe Călugăreanu
- Mirel Cană
- Liviu Cangeopol
- Ion C. Cantacuzino (politician)
- Gheorghe Caranda
- Petre P. Carp
- Lascăr Catargiu
- Eduard Caudella
- Alexandru Cazaban
- Maria Chefaliady-Taban
- Marius Chelaru
- Iulian Chifu
- Radu Chiriac
- Harry Lionel Churchill
- Maria Cicherschi Ropală
- Sebastian Ciobanu
- Ioana Ciolacu
- Grigore Cobălcescu
- Mihai Codreanu
- Petru Comarnescu
- Roxana Cogianu
- Traian Cogut
- Gabriela Coman
- Roxana Condurache
- Grigore Constantinescu
- Petre Constantinescu-Iași
- Teodor Corban
- Constantin Corduneanu
- Constantin Corduneanu (wrestler)
- Alexandra Cornilescu
- Mioara Cortez
- Viorica Cortez
- Victor Costache
- Emil Costinescu
- Adrian Covic
- Valentina Cozma
- Ion Creangă
- Florentin Crihălmeanu
- Adrian Cristea
- Mihail Cruceanu
- Matilda Cugler-Poni
- Ioan Petru Culianu
- Nicolae Culianu
- A. C. Cuza
- Elena Cuza

== D ==
- Vlad Danale
- Nichita Danilov
- Alexandra Dariescu
- Liviu Deleanu
- Ștefan Dimitrescu
- Constantin Dimitrescu-Iași
- Benone Dohot
- Tiberiu Dolniceanu
- Marian Drenceanu
- Dolfi Drimer
- Cornelia Druțu
- Nicolae Dunca

== E ==
- Joseph Edelstein
- Pauline Edelstein
- Fernanda Eliscu
- Ștefan Emilian
- Mihai Eminescu
- Constantin Eraclide
- Sorel Etrog
- Eren Eyüboğlu

== F ==
- Emil Fagure
- Samson Fainsilber
- Anastasie Fătu
- Bonifaciu Florescu
- Cristina Flutur
- Benjamin Fondane

== G ==
- Emil Gârleanu
- Ilie Gârneață
- Ioan Grigore Ghica
- Nicolae Ghica-Budești
- Dimitrie Ghica-Comănești
- Eugen Ghica-Comănești
- Matyla Ghyka
- Lucian Giușcă
- Alma Gluck
- Themistocles Gluck
- Gus Goldstein
- Dimitrie Gusti

== H ==
- Cristian Hăisan
- Cosmin Hănceanu
- Dan Hanganu
- Spiru Haret
- Samuel Haus
- Alfred Hefter
- Zeydl Shmuel-Yehuda Helman
- Andrei Hergheligiu
- Philip Herschkowitz
- Alexandru Hrisoverghi
- Horia Hulubei

== I ==
- Magda Ianculescu
- Daniel Ianuș
- Traian Ichim
- Marius Iftimiciuc
- Adrian Ilie
- Eleny Ionel
- Florin Ionescu
- Irinel Ionescu
- Ilarion Ionescu-Galați
- Vasile Iordache
- Dan Irimiciuc
- Magda Isanos

== J ==
- Alexandru Jar
- Hilda Jerea

== K ==
- Alexandros Kantakouzinos
- Antioch Kantemir
- Arthur Kaufmann
- Paul Klapper
- Leon Klepper
- Rita Klímová
- Mihail Kogălniceanu
- Bertha Kreidmann
- Jordaki Kuparenko

== L ==
- Alina l'Ami
- Max Landesberg
- Joseph Lateiner
- Ștefan Lătescu
- Dorin Lazăr
- Mihai Lazăr
- Andy Lehrer
- Max Leibowitz
- Samuel Leibowitz
- Gheorghe N. Leon
- George Lesnea
- Ovidiu Lipan
- Isac Ludo
- Dan Lungu
- Florin Lupeică
- Magda Lupescu

== M ==
- Radu Manicatide
- Mioara Mantale
- Lucia Mantu
- Nicolae Marcoci
- Șmil Marcovici
- Gheorghe Mărdărescu
- De Hirsh Margules
- Alexandru Marin
- Anamaria Marinca
- Sabina Măriuță
- Gheorghe Mârzescu
- Despina Mavrocordat
- Petre Mavrogheni
- Édouard de Max
- Julie Mayaya
- Ana Măzăreanu
- Constantin Meissner
- Constantin Mille
- Mărgărita Miller Verghy
- Ionuț Moisă
- Andu Moisi
- Sabin Moldovan
- Angela Moroșanu
- Dumitru C. Moruzi
- Jennie Moscowitz
- Elena Moșuc
- Cristian Mungiu
- Alina Mungiu-Pippidi
- Andrei Muraru
- Florica Musicescu

== N ==
- Daniela Nane
- Bernard Natan
- Émile Natan
- Anton Naum
- Costache Negri
- Iacob Negruzzi
- Leon C. Negruzzi
- Bernardo Neustadt
- Margareta Niculescu
- Jacob Itzhak Niemirower

== O ==
- Gabriela Olărașu
- Marius Onofraș

== P ==
- George Emil Palade
- Theodor Pallady
- Petre P. Panaitescu
- Daniel Pancu
- Ermil Pangrati
- Rita Pankhurst, Librarian in Ethiopia and the UK
- Ionuț Panțîru
- Anastasie Panu
- George Panu
- Alin Pânzaru
- Iozefina Păuleţ
- George Poede
- Alexandru A. Philippide
- Lupu Pick
- Ilie Pintilie
- Mihai Pintilii
- Mario Pipoș
- Margareta Pogonat
- Vasile Pogor
- Cornel Popa
- Ilie Popa
- Ștefan Popescu
- Gheorghe Popovici
- Andreea Prisăcariu
- Maricica Puică
- Cristian Pulhac

== R ==
- Emil Racoviță
- Irma Wolpe Rademacher
- Prince Radu of Romania
- I. M. Rașcu
- Oswald von Richthofen
- Raluca Ripan
- Mendi Rodan
- Alexandru Romalo
- Arnold Rosé
- Eduard Rosé
- Meir Rosenne
- Nicolae Rosetti-Bălănescu
- Radu Rosetti
- Laurențiu Roșu

== S ==
- Paul-Mihu Sadoveanu
- Cosmin Saizu
- Mihály Salbeck
- Irina Schrotter
- Elias Schwarzfeld
- Arthur Segal
- Bennett E. Siegelstein
- Vasile Simionaș
- Vlăduț Simionescu
- Constantin Sion
- Mariana Sîrbu
- Matei Socor
- Maurice Solovine
- Gheorghe Spacu
- Albert Spaier
- Constantin Stamati
- Vlad Stancu
- Avram Steuerman-Rodion
- Cosmina Stratan
- Bogdan Straton
- Elisabeta Strul
- Alexandru Sturdza
- Dimitri Sturdza
- Dimitrie Sturdza
- Grigore Sturdza
- Mihail Sturdza
- Roxandra Sturdza
- Lucia Sturdza-Bulandra
- Dimitrie C. Sturdza-Scheianu
- D. I. Suchianu
- Corneliu Șumuleanu
- Victor Surdu
- Rodica Sutzu

== T ==
- Matei Tănasă
- Ștefan Târnovanu
- Aaron Moses Taubes
- Ionel Teodoreanu
- Lucian Dan Teodorovici
- Paul Tincu
- Bianca Tiron
- Petrișor Toderașc
- Mihalache Toma
- Nicolae Tonitza
- Dan Topolinschi
- Iancu Țucărman
- Toma Tudoran
- David Twersky

== U ==
- Mihai Răzvan Ungureanu

== V ==
- Radu Varia
- Ghizela Vass
- Andreea Verdes
- Anatol Vieru
- Nicolae Vogoride
- Eugeniu Voinescu
- Dimitrie Voinov
- Lascăr Vorel

== W ==
- Max Wexler

== X ==
- Adela Xenopol
- Alexandru Dimitrie Xenopol
- Margareta Xenopol
- Nicolae Xenopol

== Y ==
- Leon Rene Yankwich

== Z ==
- Alexandru Iulian Zaharia
- Florin Zalomir
- Paul Zarifopol
- Savel Zimand
- Ovidiu Zotta
