= Negruzzi =

Negruzzi is a Romanian surname that may refer to:

- Constantin Negruzzi
- Ella Negruzzi, daughter of Leon C.
- Iacob C. Negruzzi, son of Constantin
- Leon C. Negruzzi, son of Constantin
- Leon M. Negruzzi, grandson of Leon C.
