= Xenopol =

Xenopol is a Romanian surname. It is the surname of the notable Xenopol family from Romania, a family of Greek and Jewish origins. It may refer to:

- Adela Xenopol (1861–1939), Romanian writer and feminist, sister of Alexandru and Nicolae
- Alexandru Dimitrie Xenopol (1847–1920), Romanian scholar, essayist, historic, member of the Romanian Academy, brother of the second
- Margareta Xenopol (1892-1979), composer and pianist, daughter of Alexandru
- Nicolae Xenopol (1858–1917), Romanian politician and diplomat, brother of the first
