= Dimitriev =

Dimitriev is a surname. Notable people with the surname include:

- Artur Dimitriev (born 1968), a Russian pair skater.
- Emil Dimitriev (born 1979), a Macedonian politician and sociologist.
- Radko Dimitriev (1859–1918), a Bulgarian general.

== See also ==
- Dimitrie
