= Landesberg =

Landesberg is a surname. Notable people with the surname include:

- Max Landesberg (1840–1895), Romanian physician and occulist
- Steve Landesberg (1936–2010), American actor
- Sylven Landesberg (born 1990), American-Israeli basketball player

== See also ==
- Landsberg (surname)
