= Dimitrie =

Dimitrie is the Romanian form of a Slavic given name. Notable persons with that name include:

First name

- Dimitrie Alexandresco (1850–1925), Romanian encyclopedist
- Dimitrie Anghel (1872–1914), Romanian poet
- Dimitri Atanasescu (1836–1907), Aromanian teacher commonly referred to as Dimitrie Atanasescu
- Dimitrie Bogos (1889–1946), Romanian politician
- Dimitrie Bolintineanu (1819–1872), Romanian poet, diplomat, politician, and revolutionary
- Dimitrie Brândză (1846–1895), Romanian botanist
- Dimitrie Brătianu (1818–1892), Romanian politician, Prime Minister of Romania in 1881
- Dimitrie Cantemir (1673–1723), Prince of Moldavia
- Dimitrie Călugăreanu (1868-1937), Romanian physician and naturalist
- Dimitrie Cărăuş (born 1892), a Bessarabian politician, member of the Moldovan Parliament (1917–1918)
- Dimitrie Comșa (1846-1931), Romanian agronomer and activist
- Dimitrie Cornea (1816–1884), Romanian politician, and diplomat
- Dimitrie Cozacovici (1790–1868), Romanian historian
- Dimitrie Cuclin (1885–1978), Romanian classical music composer, musicologist, philosopher, translator, and writer
- Demetru Dem. Demetrescu-Buzău, Romanian writer Urmuz (1883–1923)
- Dimitrie Drăghicescu (1875–1945), Romanian politician, sociologist, diplomat and writer
- Dimitrie Dragomir (1884–?), Bessarabian politician
- Dimitrie Dron (born 1892), a Bessarabian politician, member of the Moldovan Parliament (1917–1918)
- Dimitrie Gerota (1867–1939), Romanian anatomist, physician, radiologist, and urologist
- Dimitrie Ghica (1816–1897), Romanian politician, Prime Minister of Romania 1868-1870
- Dimitrie Ghica-Comăneşti (1839–1923), Romanian nobleman, explorer, hunter, and politician
- Dimitrie I. Ghika (1875–1967), Romanian politician and diplomat
- Dimitrie Gusti (1880–1955), Romanian sociologist, ethnologist, historian, and voluntarist philosopher
- Dimitrie Ivanov (1944–1998), Romanian Olympic sprint canoer
- Dimitrie Leonida (1883–1965), engineer, professor, founder of Dimitrie Leonida Technical Museum
- Dimitrie Lovcinski, a Moldovan politician, served as the mayor of Chişinău between 1825 and 1830
- Dimitrie Macedonski (c. 1780–1843), Wallachian soldier and revolutionary leader
- Dimitrie Maimarolu (1859–1926), Romanian architect
- Dimitrie Onciul (1856–1923), Romanian historian
- Dimitrie Paciurea (1873–1932), Romanian abstract sculptor
- Dimitrie Panaitescu Perpessicius pen name of Dumitru S. Panaitescu (1891–1971)
- Dimitrie Petrino (1838–1878), Romanian poet
- Dimitrie Pompeiu (1873–1954), Romanian mathematician
- Dimitrie Popescu (born 1961), Romanian Olympic rower
- Dimitrie Prelipcean (1927–1987), Romanian writer, historian
- Dimitrie Sturdza (1833–1914), Romanian statesman, president of the Romanian Academy 1882-1884

Middle name

- Alexandru Dimitrie Xenopol (1847–1920), Romanian scholar, economist, philosopher, historian, professor, sociologist, and author
- Barbu Dimitrie Ştirbei (1796 or 1801–1869), Prince of Wallachia

== See also ==
- Dimitar, given name
- Dmitry, given name
- Dumitru, a variant
