= Leon M. Negruzzi =

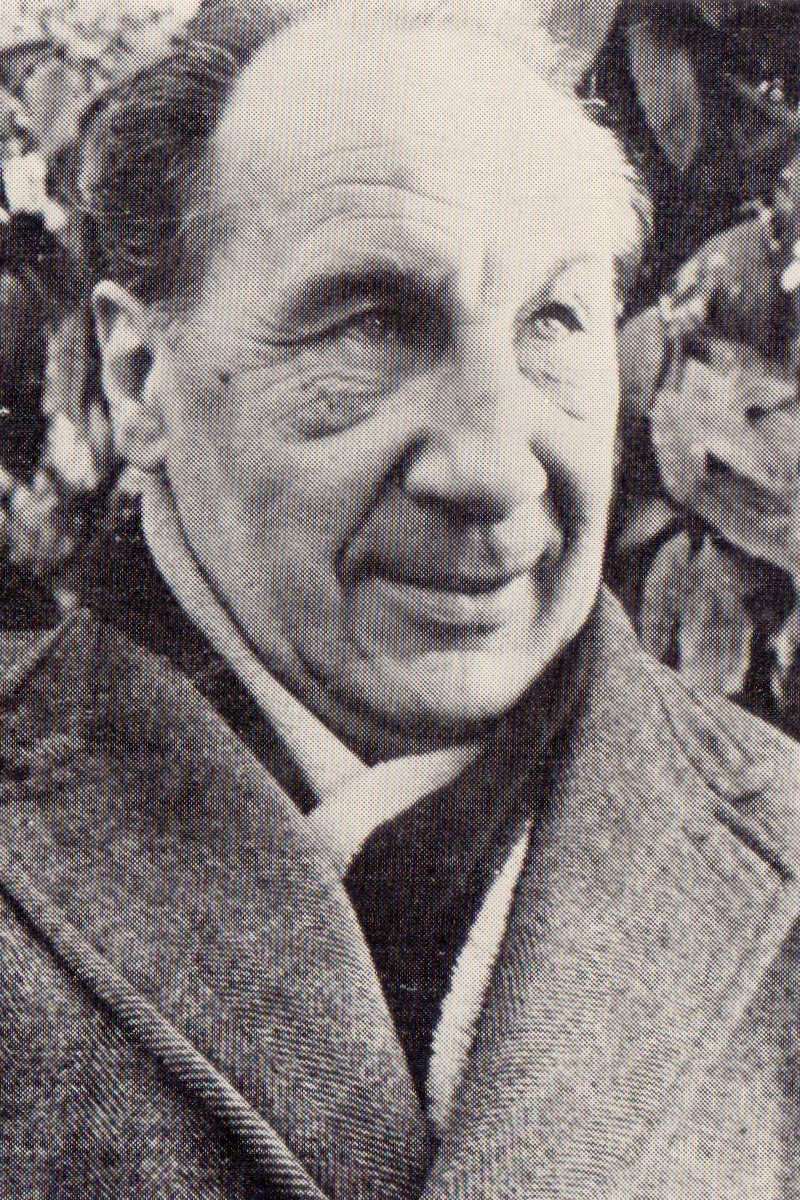
Photo of Leon M. Negruzzi

Leon M. Negruzzi (August 17, 1899–October 6, 1987) was a Romanian poet, prose writer and translator.

Born in the Austrian city of Wiener Neustadt, his parents were Mihail L. Negruzzi, a general in the Romanian Army, and his wife Lucia (née Miclescu). His great-grandfather was Constantin Negruzzi, while Iacob Negruzzi was his great-uncle. In 1916, he graduated from the Iași Boarding High School. Following World War I, he obtained a degree from the law faculty of Iași University. He settled in France in 1925, and worked at Éditions Albin Michel. Following World War II and the onset of a communist regime in his native country, he was active in informing the Western public about he situation in Soviet-occupied Romania. In February 1952, he presented a Mémorandum des refugiés roumains adressé a l’Organisation des Nations Unies to the United Nations General Assembly; the document was signed by a number of Romanian writers, including Aron Cotruș, Mircea Eliade, Claudiu Isopescu and Eugen Lozovan. Negruzzi published travel accounts, novels and poems. His prose was Voltairesque and he observed humankind without illusions. He also translated Romanian novels into French. He died in Paris.
