= Gheorghe Bogdan =

Gheorghe Bogdan can refer to:

- George Bogdan (1859–1930), Romanian physician and professor
- Gheorghe Bogdan-Duică (1866–1934), Romanian literary critic
