= 200 Proven Recipes for Dishes, Pastries and Other Household Works =

First cookbook printed in Romanian

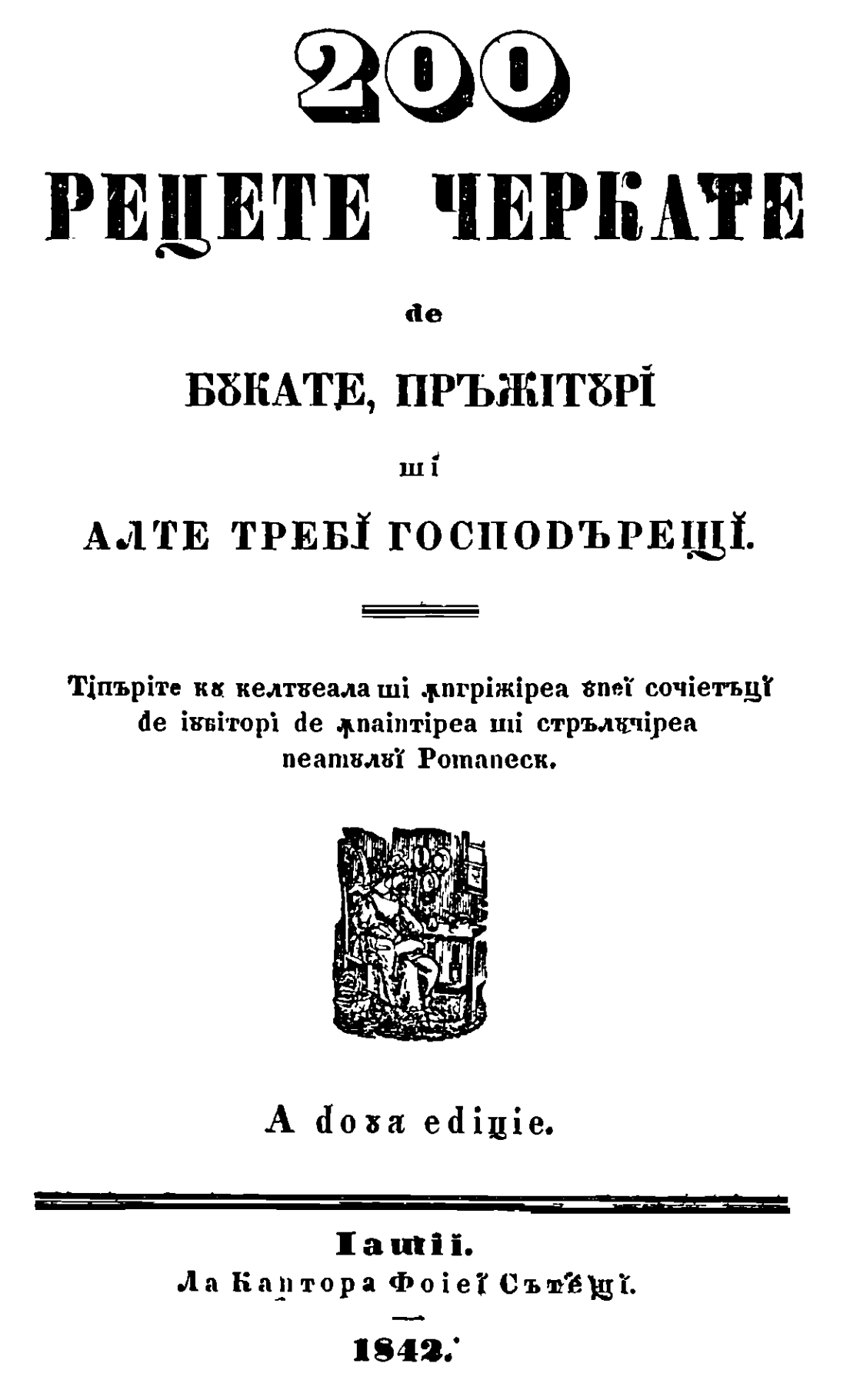
- Cover of the second edition, 1842
- Author: Constantin Negruzzi, Mihail Kogălniceanu
- Original title: 200 rețete cercate de bucate, prăjituri și alte trebi gospodărești
- Language: Romanian
- Genre: Cookbook
- Publication date: 1841
- Publication place: Principality of Moldova
- English publication date: 2023

"200 Proven Recipes for Dishes, Pastries and Other Household Works" (Romanian: 200 rețete cercate de bucate, prăjituri și alte trebi gospodărești) is the first cookbook printed in Romanian. It was published in 1841 in Iași by the printing house "Cantora Foiei Sătești" and saw two subsequent editions within the first five years: one in 1842 and another in 1846. The 1842 edition was identical to the original, while the third edition included several corrections.

== Authors ==
The authors of the cookbook were not explicitly named in the text. However, a warning against unauthorized reproduction in the first edition was signed with the initials K.N. – M.K. In his novella "Lost illusions", published in the same year by the same publisher, Mihail Kogălniceanu mentioned that he and Mr. K.N. co-published a book intended to challenge established customs and norms in the country, aiming to spark a culinary revolution throughout Moldova. It was well-known in Iași that the book was authored by two young aristocrats from the Principality of Moldova who would later become notable writers and political figures in Romania: Costache Negruzzi (Note: Also spelled as Kostache Negruzzi) and Mihail Kogălniceanu.

== Historical Context ==
Prior to this collection, the only source of recipes in Romanian was a manuscript titled "Book in which dishes of fish and crayfish, oysters, snails, vegetables, greens, and other dry and sweet dishes are described according to their order", dated to the late 17th century. This manuscript was passed down with additions from generation to generation until the 19th century. It originally belonged to the library of Constantin Cantacuzino, a stolnic of Wallachia, and authorship is sometimes attributed to him. There is also speculation that this manuscript dates back to the first half of the 18th century and may be a translation from Italian. It was first published in 1997 in the book "The world in a cookbook: The Brâncovenesc era manuscript".

== About the Book ==
In his novella "Lost illusions", Kogălniceanu also notes that the authors aspired to gain a high reputation among cooks and to be recognized as innovators of culinary art in Moldova. The recipes indeed challenged the established customs of the region. According to a culinary historian Henry Notaker, the young authors were determined to enlighten Moldovan society by introducing new and revolutionary culinary techniques from the West.

Notaker emphasizes that history and traditions played a crucial role in national movements, and the publication of cookbooks in national languages was of great significance. The first cookbook in Icelandic was printed in 1800, in Greek in 1828, in Finnish in 1834, and in Slovak in 1871. However, these cookbooks did not feature collections of folk dishes; instead, their recipes were borrowed from European cuisines with longer-established traditions.

Alongside a limited number of traditional dishes, the first Romanian cookbook includes recipes from contemporary Austrian, Hungarian, French, and German cuisines. Some recipes were taken from Anna Hofbauer's Austrian cookbook and the so-called Hungarian national cookbook by István Cifráy (or possibly from a common source).

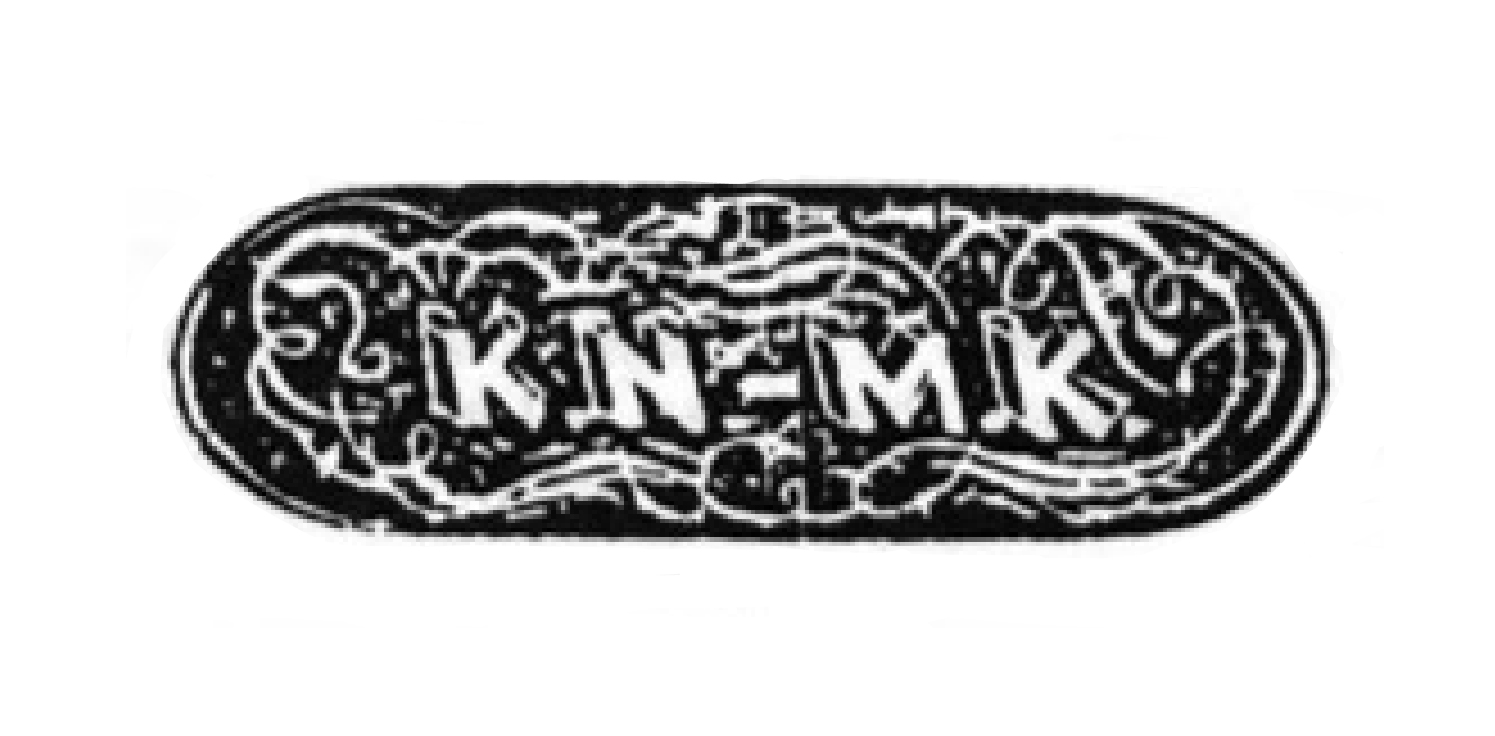
Authors' monogram on the first edition of 1841

According to the title of the book, the recipes are described as "proven". This does not necessarily imply that they were tested by the authors themselves. The phrase "tried and tested" is often used in older European cookbooks to indicate that recipes have been tested and refined over time, thus ensuring their reliability and effectiveness.

The book offers uneven coverage of culinary topics, with an almost complete absence of fish recipes but a significant emphasis on desserts, including puddings, cakes, and jellies. It contains the first known recipe for kürtőskalács in the Romanian language.

The book is printed in a transitional alphabet that uses both Cyrillic and Latin letters. The language reflects the peculiarities of word usage and pronunciation in 19th century Moldova. It predominantly employs the old system of measures and weights used in Moldova, which was based on the Ottoman units of measurement.

== Historical Significance ==
This cookbook serves as a valuable historical document that reflects the cuisine, language, and lifestyle of Moldova in the first half of the 19th century. As the first cookbook published in Romanian, it played a significant role in establishing culinary terminology.

Three decades later, many recipes from this book were copied by Ecaterina Steriady for her book "The Good Housekeeper". The book was first printed using the Latin alphabet in 1973 and has since been reissued in Romania at least seven times. In 2023, a commented English translation of the book was released. In 2023, a commented English translation of the book was published, and in 2025 – a bilingual Romanian-Russian annotated edition.

The Moldova Brunch project organizes festivals in Iași where dishes from "200 proven recipes..." are recreated.

== Editions and Translations ==
- Negruzzi, Costache; Kogălniceanu, Mihail (1841). 200 rețete cercate de bucate, prăjituri și alte trebi gospodărești [200 proven recipes for dishes, pastries and other household works] (PDF) (in Romanian). Iași: Cantora Foiei Sătești.
- Negruzzi, Costache; Kogălniceanu, Mihail (1842). 200 rețete cercate de bucate, prăjituri și alte trebi gospodărești [200 proven recipes for dishes, pastries and other household works] (PDF) (in Romanian) (2nd ed.). Iași: Cantora Foiei Sătești.
- Negruzzi, Costache; Kogălniceanu, Mihail (1846). 200 rețete cercate de bucate, prăjituri și alte trebi gospodărești [200 proven recipes for dishes, pastries and other household works] (PDF) (in Romanian) (3rd ed.). Iași: Tipografia Institutului Albinei.
- Kogălniceanu, Mihail; Negruzzi, Costache (1973). Moraru, Titus (ed.). 200 rețete cercate de bucate, prăjituri și alte trebi gospodărești [200 proven recipes for dishes, pastries and other household works] (in Romanian). Cluj-Napoca: Dacia.
- Kogălniceanu, Mihail; Negruzzi, Costache (1998). Carte de bucate boierești: 200 rețete cercate de bucate, prăjituri și alte trebi gospodărești [Boyar's cookbook: 200 proven recipes for dishes, pastries and other household works] (in Romanian). Cluj-Napoca: Dacia.
- Negruzzi, Costache; Kogălniceanu, Mihail (2004). 200 rețete cercate de bucate, prăjituri și alte trebi gospodărești [200 proven recipes for dishes, pastries and other household works] (in Romanian). Iași: Editura ALFA. ISBN 973-8278-39-2.
- Kogălniceanu, Mihail; Negruzzi, Costache (2005). 200 rețete cercate de bucate, prăjituri și alte trebi gospodărești [200 proven recipes for dishes, pastries and other household works] (in Romanian). Iași: Timpul.
- Kogălniceanu, Mihail; Negruzzi, Kostache (2007). Pandele, Rodica (ed.). Carte de bucate boierești: 200 rețete cercate de bucate, prăjituri și alte trebi gospodărești [Boyar's cookbook: 200 proven recipes for dishes, pastries and other household works] (in Romanian). București: Vremea. ISBN 978-9736452802.
- Kogălniceanu, Mihail; Negruzzi, Costache (2011). Carte de bucate boierești: 200 rețete cercate de bucate, prăjituri și alte trebi gospodărești [Boyar's cookbook: 200 proven recipes for dishes, pastries and other household works] (in Romanian). Cluj-Napoca: Dacia XXI. ISBN 978-606-8214-85-6.
- Kogălniceanu, Mihail; Negruzzi, Kostache (2013). Carte de bucate boierești: 200 rețete cercate de bucate, prăjituri și alte trebi gospodărești [Boyar's cookbook: 200 proven recipes for dishes, pastries and other household works] (in Romanian). București: Paideia. ISBN 978-973-596-914-1.
- Kogălniceanu, Mihail; Negruzzi, Costache (2017). Papuc, Liviu (ed.). 200 de rețete cercate de bucătărie românească și alte trebi gospodărești [200 proven recipes for Romanian dishes and other household works] (in Romanian). Iași: Editura Junimea. ISBN 978-973-37-2039-3.
- Negruzzi, Costache; Kogălniceanu, Mihail (2023). Șvera, Iurii (ed.). 200 proven recipes for dishes, pastries and other household works. KDP. ISBN 979-8870261447.
- Negruzzi, Costache; Kogălniceanu, Mihail (2025). Șvera, Iurii (ed.). 200 rețete cercate de bucate, prăjituri și alte trebi gospodărești/ 200 опробованных рецептов блюд, пирогов и других хозяйственных дел [200 proven recipes for dishes, pastries and other household works] (in Russian). Chișinău: Polisalm. ISBN 9789975368469.

== Bibliography ==
- XVII century manuscript. Carte întru care se scriu mâncările de pește i raci, stridii, melci, legumi, erburi și alte mâncări de sec și de dulce, după orânduiala lor [Book in which fish and crayfish dishes, oysters, snails, vegetables, herbs and other dry and sweet dishes are written, according to their order] (in Romanian).
- Hofbauer, Anna (1825). Allgemeines österreichisches oder neuestes Wiener Kochbuch in jeder Haushaltung brauchbar... [General Austrian or newest Viennese cookbook useful in every household...] (in German). Wien: Mörschner und Jasper.
- Czifray, István (1840). Czifray István szakács mester magyar nemzeti szakácskönyve [The Hungarian national cookbook by master chef István Czifray] (in Hungarian) (6th ed.). Pest: Trattner és Károlyi.
- Kogălniceanu, Mihail (1841). Iluzii pierdute [Lost illusions] (in Romanian). Iași: Cantora Foiei Sătești.
- Steriady, Ecaterina (1871). Buna menajeră [Good housekeeper] (in Romanian). Galați: Otto Bielig.
- Stoicescu, Nicolae (1971). Cum măsurau strămoșii. Metrologia medievală pe teritoriul României [How our ancestors measured. Medieval metrology on the territory of Romania] (in Romanian). București: Editura Științifică.
- Chivu, Gheorghe (1983). "Cuvinte de origine italiană într-un manuscris românesc din prima jumătate a secolului al XVIII-lea" [Words of Italian origin in a Romanian manuscript from the first half of the 18th century]. SCL (in Romanian). XXXIV (4). București: Editura Academiei Republicii Socialiste România: 342–346.
- Notaker, Henry (1990). "Romania: Cooking, Literature and Politics. A Cookbook from Moldova, 1841". Petits Propos Culinaires. 35. London: Prospect Books Ltd: 7–22.
- Constantinescu, Ioana; Cazacu, Matei, eds. (1997). O lume într-o carte de bucate: manuscris din epoca brâncovenească [The world in a cookbook: The Brâncovenesc era manuscript] (in Romanian). București: Editura Fundației Culturale Române.
- Calistru, Doina (2011). "Gustul modernizării: primele trei cărți de bucate din Țara Româneasca și Moldova" [The Taste of Modernization: The First Three Cookbooks from Wallachia and Moldavia]. Buletinul Muzeului de istorie a Moldovei "Ioan Neculce" (in Romanian). XIII–XV (2007–2009). Iași: Palatul culturii: 21–36.
- Chivu, Gheorghe (2012). "Cărțile de bucate, un izvor lexicografic insuficient exploatat" [Cookbooks, an insufficiently exploited lexicographical source]. Limba română. LXI (3). București: 304–311.
- Notaker, Henry (2017). A History of Cookbooks: From Kitchen to Page over Seven Centuries. California Studies in Food and Culture. Vol. 64. Oakland, California: University of California Press. ISBN 978-0-520-29400-4.
- Nagy, Imola Katalin (2019). Pletl, Rita; Kovács, Gabriella (eds.). "Elemente lingvistice maghiare în prima carte de bucate românească" [Hungarian linguistic elements in the first Romanian cookbook]. Multilingvism și plurilingvism în Europa. Kolozsvár: Scientia Kiadó: 119–141.
- Neț, Mariana, ed. (2019). Limba cărților de bucate românești [The language of Romanian cookbooks] (in Romanian). București: Editura Academiei Române. ISBN 978-973-27-3119-2.
