= Leon C. Negruzzi =

Moldavian and later Romanian politician and writer

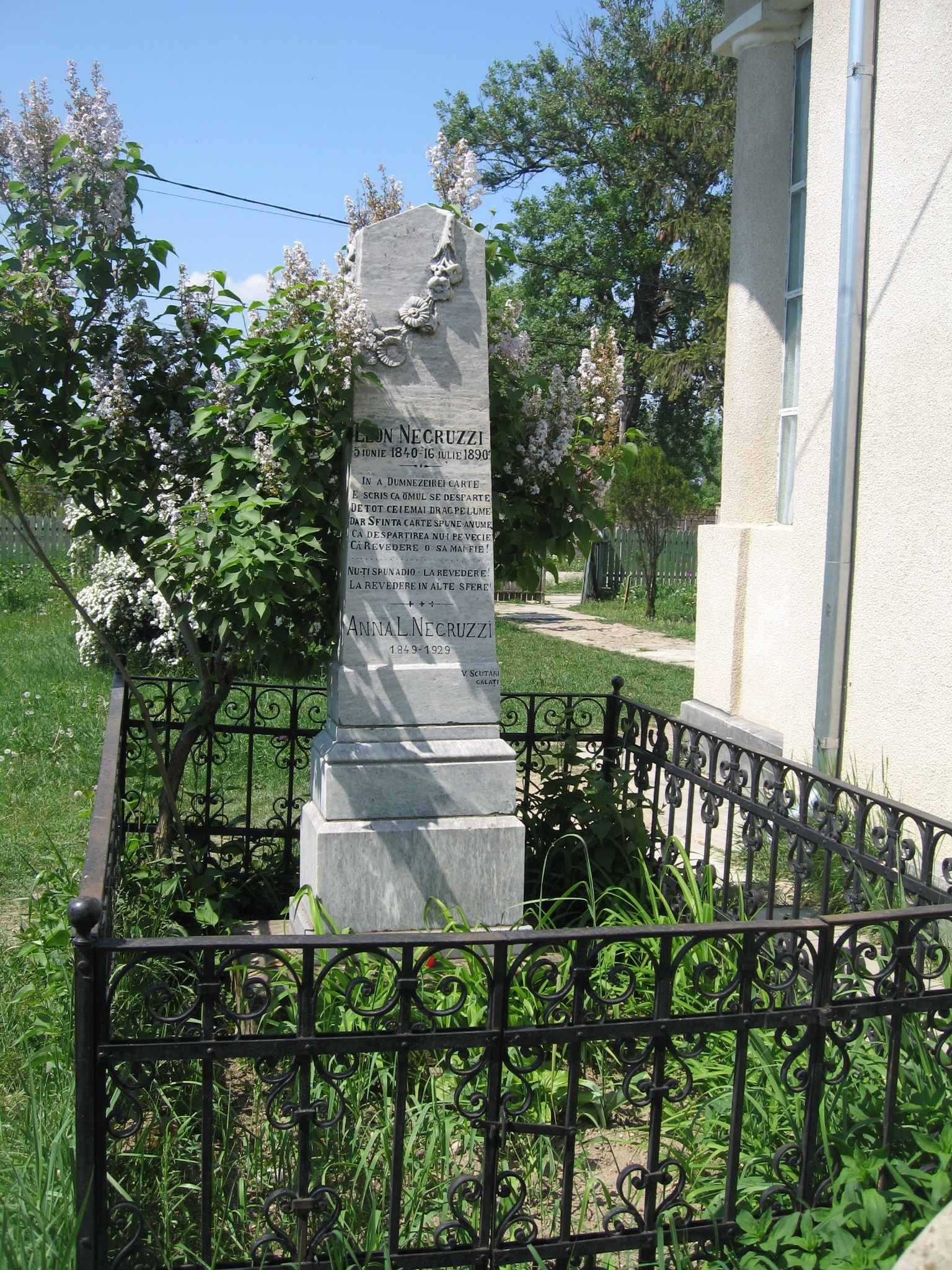
Grave at Hermeziu

Leon C. Negruzzi (June 5, 1840 – July 15/16, 1890) was a Moldavian, later Romanian politician and writer.

Born in Iași, he was the first child of Constantin Negruzzi. He began his education at Academia Mihăileană, but completed high school in Berlin, where he was sent with his brother Iacob in 1853. He wanted to study medicine at Berlin University, but was too revolted by the anatomical dissections, and switched to philosophy and law. He attended lectures at Berlin and Vienna, but did not graduate. He returned home in 1864, where he was named a judge at the Iași tribunal. He gradually advanced to become a member of the appeals court as well as general prosecutor. A member of the Conservative Party, he was Prefect of Iași County under the Lascăr Catargiu government (1871-1876), resuming this office in March 1888. He also served as mayor of Iași, as deputy and as senator. Near the end of his life, he was administrator of Sfântul Spiridon Hospital. He died at the family estate in Hermeziu village.

Also interested in literature, he belonged to the cultural milieu surrounding Junimea and Convorbiri Literare, which his brother edited. He wrote six novellas: Vântul soartei (1867), Evreica (1868-1869), O răzbunare (1874), Țiganca (1877), Serghie Pavlovici (1881) and Osândiții (1881-1882). All appeared in his brother's magazine, and were judged by Titu Maiorescu as "distinguished neither by the originality of their concept nor through their style". He had five daughters and two sons.
