= Elena Cernei =

Romanian opera singer (1924–2000)

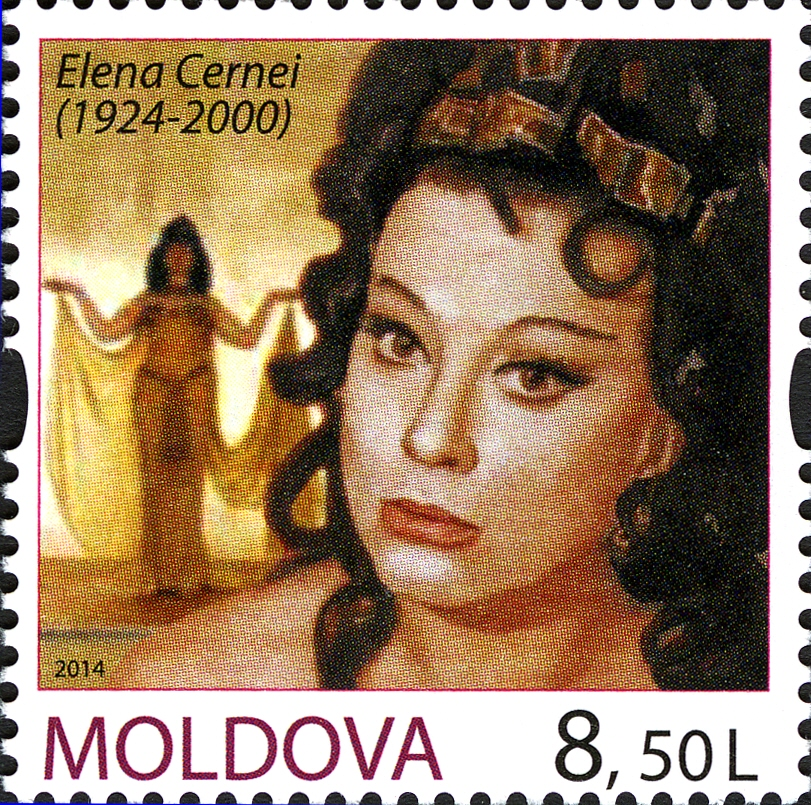

Elena Cernei (1 March 1924 – 27 November 2000) was a Romanian operatic mezzo-soprano, musicologist, and voice teacher. During her 25-year career as an opera singer, she sang in leading opera houses in both Europe and North America. In 1963, she was made Artistă Emerită (Honoured Artist) of the Republic of Romania and in 1999 received the degree of Doctor Honoris Causa from the National University of Music Bucharest for her contributions to the field of musicology.

== Biography ==
Elena Cernei was born in 1924 in Bairamcea near Cetatea Albă (now Bilhorod-Dnistrovskyi in Ukraine). She studied singing at the Ciprian Porumbescu Conservatory in Bucharest under Constantin Stroescu from 1951 to 1955. During that period, she also sang as a soloist with the George Enescu Philharmonic Orchestra and at the Romanian National Opera. She continued to sing with the Romanian National Opera from 1952 to 1977, as well as touring Europe and North America starting in the mid-1960s. Outside of Romania she sang at La Scala, the New York Metropolitan Opera, Opéra National de Paris, Bolshoi Theatre, Gran Teatre del Liceu in Barcelona, La Monnaie in Brussels, and the Palacio de Bellas Artes in Mexico City.

She made her Metropolitan Opera debut on 17 March 1965 as Dalila in Samson et Dalila. She performed with the company from 1965 to 1968 where in addition to Dalila, she sang Amneris in Aida, Maddalena in Rigoletto, Princess di Bouillon in Adriana Lecouvreur, and the title role in Carmen. Other roles which she sang during her career included: Azucena in Il trovatore, Clytemnestra in Iphigénie en Aulide, Arsace in Semiramide, Rosina in The Barber of Seville, Ulrica in Un ballo in maschera, Princess Eboli in Don Carlos, Laura and La Cieca in La Gioconda, Cherubino in Le nozze di Figaro, Jocaste in Œdipe, and Orfeo in Orfeo ed Euridice.

She settled in Rome with her husband, the physician and musicologist Stephan Poen, and in her later years taught voice and served on the juries of several singing competitions in Italy and Romania. Amongst her scholarly publications were L'enigma della voce umana (1987) and Et fiat lux (1999). Many of her performances in Romania were recorded on LP by Electrecord. She also recorded works by Romanian composers such as Alexandru Leon (also known as Leon Algazi), Vasile Popovici, Ion Vasilescu, and Margareta Xenopol. A DVD documentary on her life and career (with extracts from live recordings of her performances) was issued by TVR Media in 2005.

== Sources ==
- La Monnaie (Théâtre Royal de la Monnaie) Digital archives. Accessed 30 September 2009.
- Metropolitan Opera, Performance record: Cernei, Elena (Mezzo Soprano), MetOpera Database. Accessed 30 September 2009.
