= Grigore T. Popa University of Medicine and Pharmacy =

Public university-level medical school in Iași, Romania

- Universitatea de Medicină și Farmacie „Grigore T. Popa”
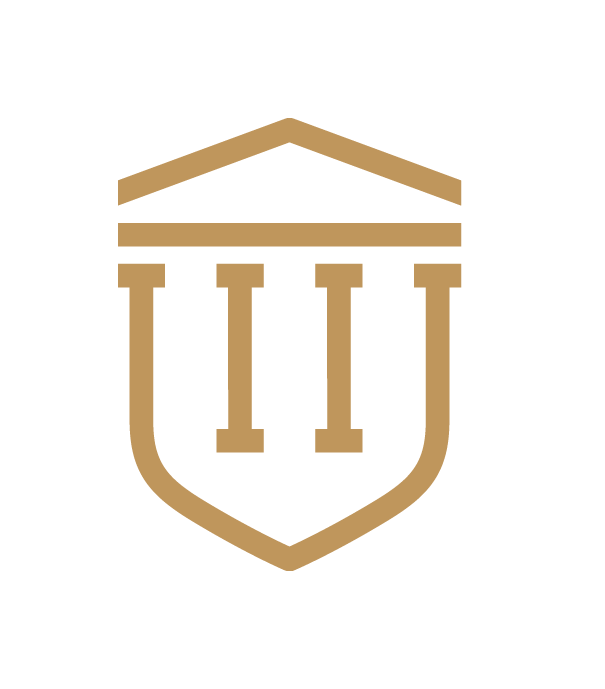
- Former names: Institute of Medicine and Pharmacy of Iași (1948–1991)
- Type: Public
- Established: 30 September 1879; 146 years ago - Faculty of Medicine of Iași
- Rector: Viorel Scripcariu
- Academic staff: 956
- Students: 11,922 (2015–2016)
- Undergraduates: 9,110
- Postgraduates: 2,812
- Location: Iași, Romania; 47°10′06″N 27°35′05″E
- Campus: Urban
- Website: www.umfiasi.ro

Grigore T. Popa University of Medicine and Pharmacy (Romanian: Universitatea de Medicină și Farmacie „Grigore T. Popa”, or UMF Iași) is a public university-level medical school located in Iași, Romania. Named in honor of the scientist Grigore T. Popa, it is classified by the Ministry of Education as an advanced research and education university.

== History ==
Romania has a long-standing tradition in the medical field. The Romanian health care system has been in existence since the 18th century, St. Spiridon Hospital (1757), in Iași, being the oldest in the historical region of Moldavia, and one of the largest in Romania.

On 30 November 1859, Surgery School of Iași was inaugurated in the Academia Mihăileană building. Founded by Nicolae Negură, it was the first Romanian language higher learning medical school in Romania.

Iași University of Medicine and Pharmacy, as one of the oldest educational places in Romania, was established on 30 September 1879, as the Faculty of Medicine, incorporated in the University of Iași.

In 1948, the Medical School was associated with the School of Pharmacy and the School of Dentistry to form together the Institute of Medicine and Pharmacy (renamed, in 1991, "Grigore T. Popa" University of Medicine and Pharmacy).

== Structure ==
The University is a complex higher education institution, comprising four divisions: Medicine, Pharmacy, Dentistry and Biomedical Engineering. In addition, it is home to eight colleges (General Nursing, Dental Technique, Dental Nursing, Audiology, Balneotherapy and Rehabilitation, Medical Cosmetics, Hygiene and Public Health, Pharmaceutical Technique). Colleges hold three-year-courses. Students are required to pass a license examination upon completion of their studies. The Medicine and Dentistry courses both last six years.

== Conferences ==
Grigore T. Popa University of Medicine and Pharmacy organizes various conferences throughout the academic year.

=== Congressis ===
Congressis is a medical students and young doctors conference (organised in April), focusing on Fundamental Sciences, Surgery, Internal Medicine and Bioethics. It is one of the most popular congresses in Romania, as it has one of the largest participations of all the medical students conferences organized throughout the country. The official language of the Congress, is English.

== Affiliations ==
Grigore T. Popa University of Medicine and Pharmacy has adopted the ECTS grading scale since the academic year 1998–1999. It is affiliated with the following educational institutions:

- University of Freiburg, Germany
- University of Lyon, France
- University of Amiens, France
- University of Amions, France
- University of Nancy, France
- University of Louvain, Belgium
- University of Torino, Italy
- University of Parma, Italy

== Hospitals Affiliations ==
- St. Spiridon Hospital
- St. Maria Clinic Children's Hospital
- Regional Oncology Institute
- Institute of Cardiovascular Diseases
- Socola Psychiatric University Hospital
- Parhon Hospital
- CFR Hospital
- Neurosurgery Hospital

== Gallery ==
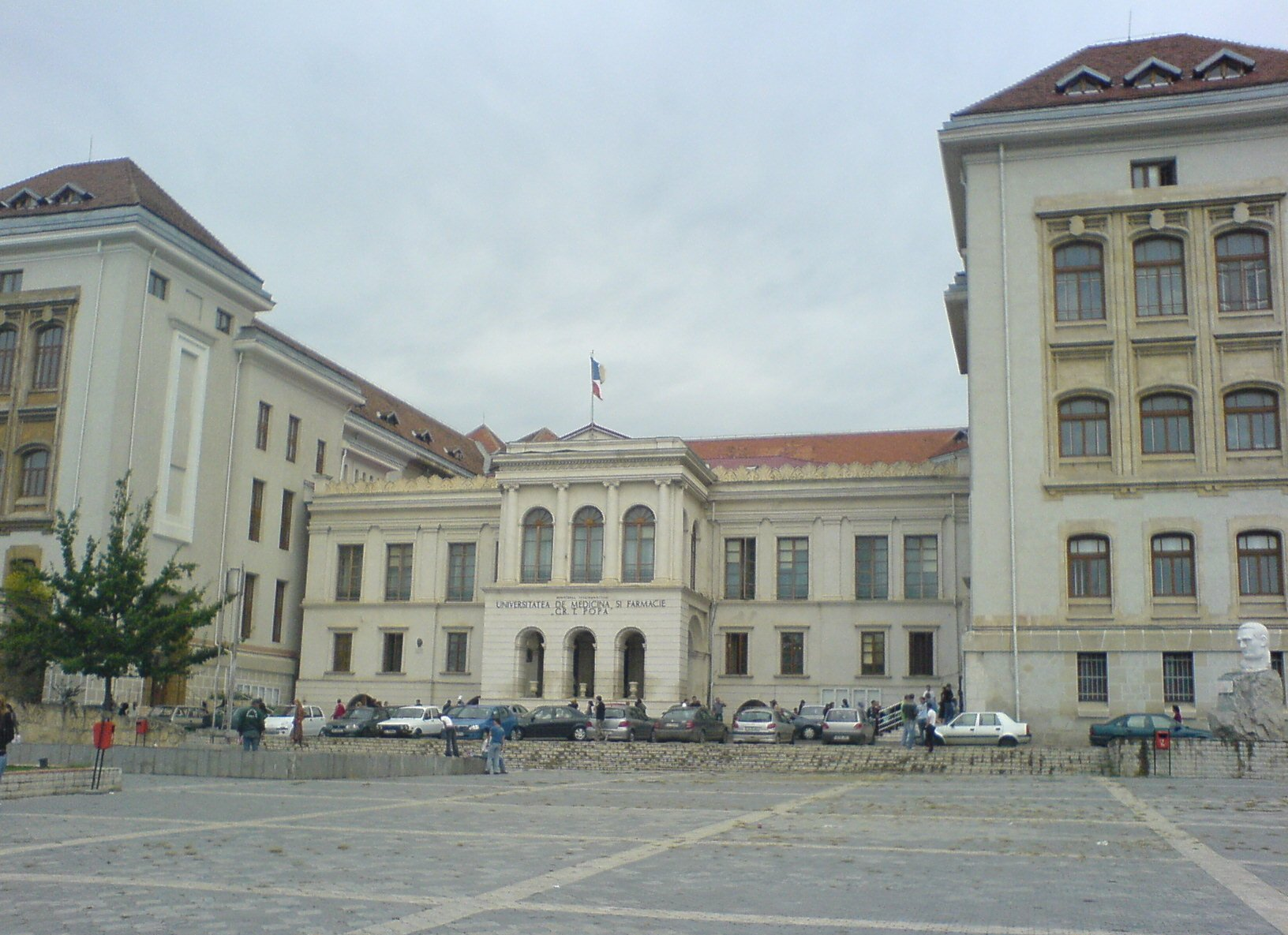
Sector A

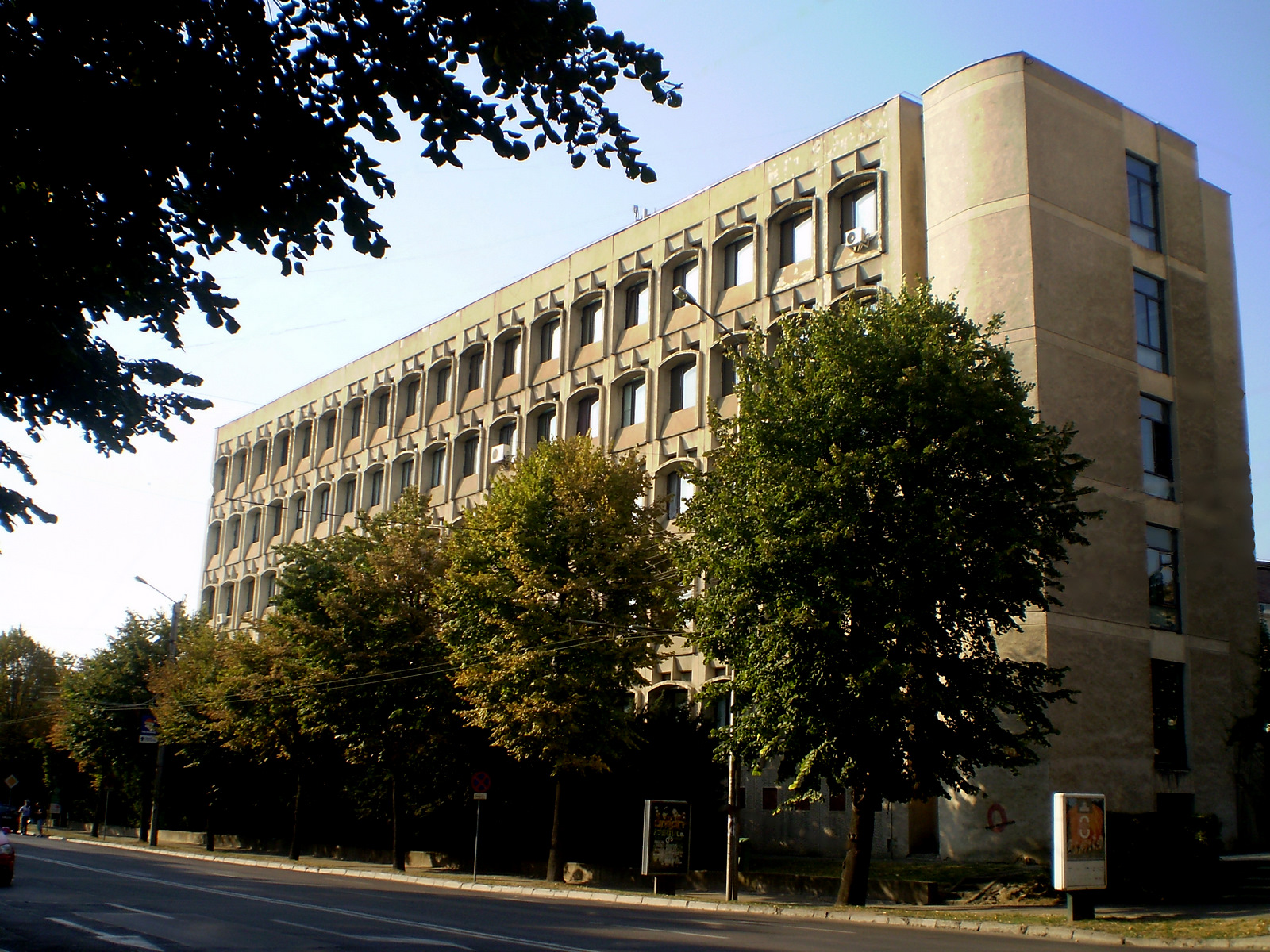
School of Pharmacy

Sector A entrance

Institute of Anatomy

Sector A

== See also ==
- George Emil Palade, the 1974 Nobel Prize winner in Physiology or Medicine, born in Iași
- Nicolae Paulescu, the discoverer of insulin
- Maria Cicherschi Ropală, first female coroner in Europe
- List of Nobel Laureates in Physiology or Medicine
- Nobel Prize Controversies

== Sources ==
- Grigore T. Popa University of Medicine and Pharmacy - Information Brochure (in English)
