= Constantin Negruzzi =

Romanian poet, novelist, translator, playwright and politician (1808 - 1868)

- Negruzzi ca. 1860s

Deputy in the Supreme Legislative and Consultative Assembly of Iași
- In office 1837–1840
- Monarch: Alexandru Ioan Cuza

City Board President (Mayor) of Iași
- In office 1840–1841

Member of the Princely Council (Divan) of Moldavia
- In office 1857–1857
- Monarch: Alexandru Ioan Cuza

Finance Minister of the Principality of Moldavia
- In office 23 May – 23 September 1861
- Prime Minister: Anastasie Panu
- Preceded by: Petre Mavrogheni
- Succeeded by: Petre Mavrogheni

Personal details
- Born: 1808 Trifeștii Vechi, Principality of Moldavia (now Hermeziu, Iași County, Romania)
- Died: 24 August [O.S. 12 August] 1868 (aged 59 or 60) Iași, United Principalities of Moldavia and Wallachia
- Resting place: Saints Constantine and Helen Church
- Spouse: Maria Gane (m. 1839–1868)
- Children: Iacob Negruzzi; Leon C. Negruzzi
- Parents: Dinu Negruț (father); Sofia Hermeziu (mother)
- Relatives: Ella Negruzzi (niece)
- Writing career
- Occupations: Poet, novelist, playwright, translator, politician
- Language: Romanian
- Period: 1837–1862
- Genres: Social novel; historical novel; novella; memoir; short story
- Movements: Realism; Romanian 1848 Movement

Constantin Negruzzi (Romanian pronunciation: [konstanˈtin neˈɡrutsi]; also known as Costache [kosˈtake]; 1808 – 24 August [O.S. 12 August] 1868) was a Romanian poet, novelist, translator, playwright, and politician. One of the Pashoptist personalities, he is notable among his writings are his memoirs, "Amintiri din junețe" (Memories of Youth), and his historical works "Fragmente istorice" (Historical Fragments), "Negru în alb" (Black in White), and "Aprodul Purice" (Aprod Flea).

He also translated several of Victor Hugo’s ballads, some of Thomas Moore’s poetry, and works by Antiochus Kantemir. Negruzzi wrote two plays, "Muza de la Burdujeni" (The Muse of Burdujeni) and "Cârlani" (Lambs), and translated a number of other dramatic works. In 1841, Negruzzi, together with Mihail Kogălniceanu, printed the first cookbook in the Romanian language: 200 Proven Recipes for Dishes, Pastries, and Other Household Works.

Negruzzi also held several public offices, including that of finance minister and deputy under Prince Mihail Sturdza. A supporter of liberalism and reform, he was twice exiled to his estate in Trifești for his criticism of the government. Both his sons, Iacob Negruzzi and Leon C. Negruzzi, also became writers.

== Biography ==
=== Childhood and early years ===
Negruzzi was born in 1808 in Trifeștii Vechi (now Hermeziu), Iași County, Moldavia, near the Prut River, as the son of Dinu Negruț, who had become a boyar with the rank of cupbearer, and Sofia Hermeziu, daughter of the Justice Logothete Iorgu Hermeziu. In 1809, while still an infant, his mother Sofia passed away. Negruzzi's family was of Răzeș origin.

Negruzzi was homeschooled by a Greek tutor. He began his studies in Greek language with one of the most renowned Greek teachers at the time in Iași, learning to read in Romanian language on his own from various works. Most notable of them being "Floarea Darurilor" (The Flower Of The Gifts), Istoria lui Arghir și a prea-furmoasei Elene" (Arghir and The Beautiful Helen's History) (translated by Ioan Barac), and Petru Maior's book "Istoria pentru încrețitul românilor în Dachia" (Dacian Romanians Hisyory), as he himself confesses in an article entitled "Cum am învățat românește" (How I learned Romanian), very interesting for the details it provides on the pedagogical methods used by teachers at that time.

=== Youth, first jobs and translation works ===
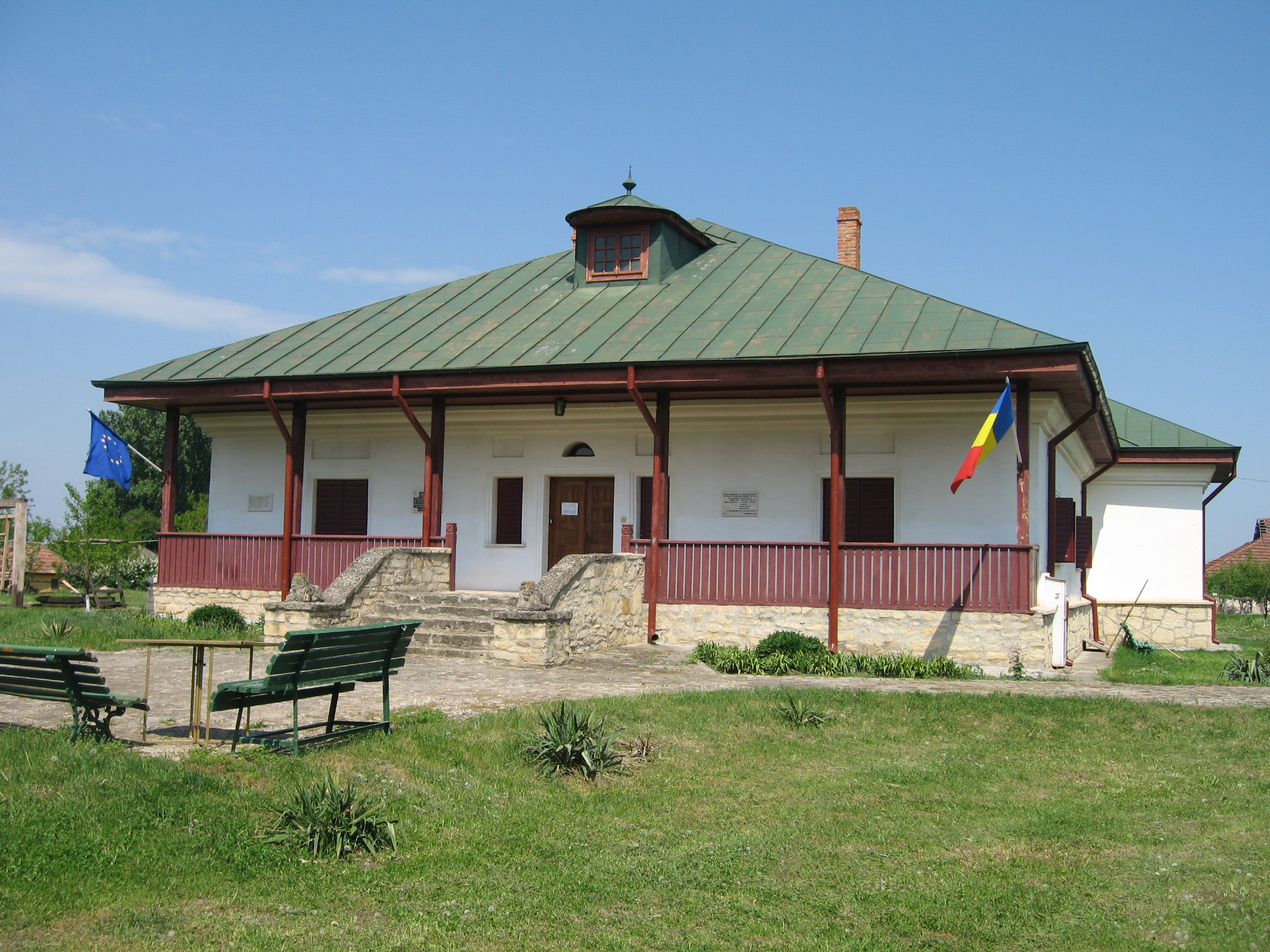
Negruzzi's memorial house from Hermeziu.

With the outbreak of the Wallachian uprising of 1821, Negruzzi took refuge in Bessarabia with his father. In Chișinău, Bessarabia, he met the Russian poet Alexander Pushkin, who aroused his interest in literature, and a French emigrant from whom he took lessons in French language and literature. One of his first literary attempts date from this period was "Zăbavele mele din Basarabia în anii 1821, 1822" (My Lags in Bessarabia in 1821, 1822).

His family returns to Iași in 1823. Negruzzi's father Dinu passed away in 1826, and after the latter's death, he held various administrative positions, from that of deacon at the treasury to that of secretary of the General Assembly, thus beginning his political life, as many sons of boyars did at the time.

During the early 1830s, Negruzzi begins publishing translations of various works, mainly from the French literature. He translated poems (Mnemon by Voltaire, The Tripod Of Helen by Jean-François Marmontel), and several short stories such as "Triizăci ani sau viața unui jucător de cărți" (Thirty Years or the Life of a Card Player) of Victor Henri Joseph Brahain Ducange & Arthur Dinaux, which had a great effect. In the National Museum of Romanian Literature (no. 36 and 37) appears the work "Corespondența dintre doi români, unul din Țara Românească și altul din Moldova" (Correspondence between two Romanians, one from Wallachia and the other from Moldavia), on the one hand Ion Heliade Rădulescu, on the other Negruzzi himself, on highly topical linguistic themes: simplification of the alphabet, introduction of neologisms and unitary Romanian language.

At the urging of Heliade, who had designed that famous universal Library, Negruzzi translates Angelo, tiranul Padovei și Maria Tudor, dramas of Victor Hugo. He publishes the poem Aprodul Purice, the source of inspiration being a legend from "O samă de cuvinte" (A Collection Of Words) by Ion Neculce, conceived as a fragment of the epic "Ștefaniada".

In 1853, Negruzzi founded the Săptămîna literary magazine.

=== Political and writing career ===
Elected in 1837 as a deputy for Iași in the Ordinary Assembly, established by the Organic Regulation, then as a senior official and as director of the theater (alongside Mihail Kogălniceanu and Vasile Alecsandri), he showed himself to be imbued with liberal ideas and eager for progress.

In 1840 he was elected "mayor" of Iași. However, during the era of the Organic Regulations (from the 1830s until the Communal Law of 1864), the administration of the city of Iași was known as the "Municipal Council" and, subsequently, the "City Board" (Eforia orășenească). This was the precursor to the modern City Hall, therefore, Negruzzi's office was similar to a President of County Council.

Negruzzi did not take part in the 1848 movement and remained withdrawn from state affairs for a long time, re-entering later as a judge, member of the Princely Divan (1857) and then, was part of the government of Anastasie Panu from under the reign of Alexandru Ioan Cuza, as director of the finance department, deputy and Churchwarden of St. Spiridon. In 1850, he becomes a member of the Masonic Lodge of Iași.

He died from heart failure on August 24, 1868, and was buried in the church cemetery in Trifeștii Vechi.

== Literary activity ==
=== Translations and interpretations ===
Negruzzi debuted with the translation of the poem "The Black Shawl" by Alexander Pushkin. Then he undertook the translation of Victor Hugo's ballads, a meritorious work, because he sought to use a verse analogous to that of the French poet, a verse that was difficult to do in Romanian, especially at the time when Negruzzi was writing (e.g. "Pasul de arme al Regelui Ioan (King John's Passage of Arms)) and because many of them express the author's idea very well in pure Romanian. Among the most successful ones is "Uriașul" (The Giant). Another important translation is the satires of Antioh Cantemir, from Russian, made together with Alecu Donici.

=== Poems ===
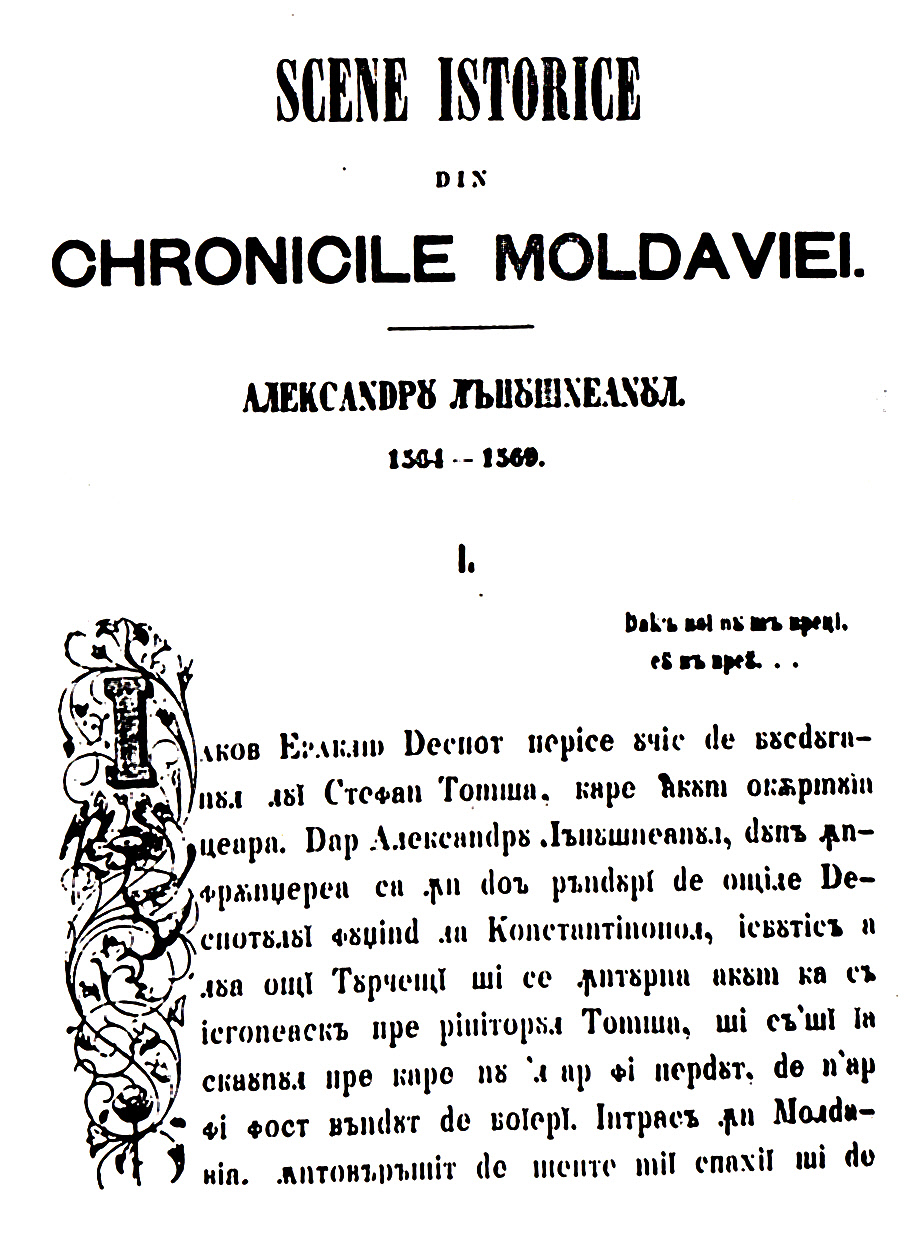
"Chronicles Of Moldavia" cover for Alexandru Lăpușneanul

[Costache Negruzzi] ... was a true encyclopedist, versed not only in literary but also historical and philosophical knowledge, aided by a prodigious memory and knowledge of several foreign languages. He, in fact, spoke and wrote Greek, French, German and Russian, without mentioning (sic!) Latin and Italian, whose literatures were not foreign to him. Costache Negruzzi was, at that time, one of the first who had performed the miracle of introducing himself into the society of the first-class boyars, of obtaining the function of member of the Divan and the rank of postelnic, a function and rank that were like an appanage for aristocratic families. He, in truth, with his superior intelligence, with his rare culture at that time, with his original but distinguished manners, was not only well received, but even invited and persistently drawn into the great houses.

— Gheorghe Sion on Negruzzi in his work "Din tinerețe" (From Youth) (chap. XIII), included in the volume "Suvenire Contempurane" (Contemporary souvenirs).

Negruzzi also wrote original poems, but these are not the most brilliant part of his work. His most significant work in verse is "Aprodul Purice" (Aprod Flea) (where "aprod" was a minor noble title, usually referring to the son of a lord; Purice is a proper name but literally means "flea"; see Movilești). The beginning is pastoral; the epic tone is preserved, but the interest and poetic qualities decrease at a certain point and from here on it is only a rhymed chronicle.

The poem begins by describing the peaceful state of Moldavia, which had escaped wars. Hronoda, a Hungarian general of King Matthias Corvinus, learning that Stephen the Great was far from the Hungarian borders, decided to undertake an invasion of the principality to take revenge against Stephen, who had defeated him many times. The preparations that the Hungarians were starting to make were, however, discovered by a Romanian, who found himself lost in the enemy army. He, spurred on by love of country, ran to the rascal from Roman and told him what was being plotted among the Hungarians. The rascal hastily sent a courier to Stephen and at the same time took some measures to meet the enemy if he arrived earlier.

=== Prose ===
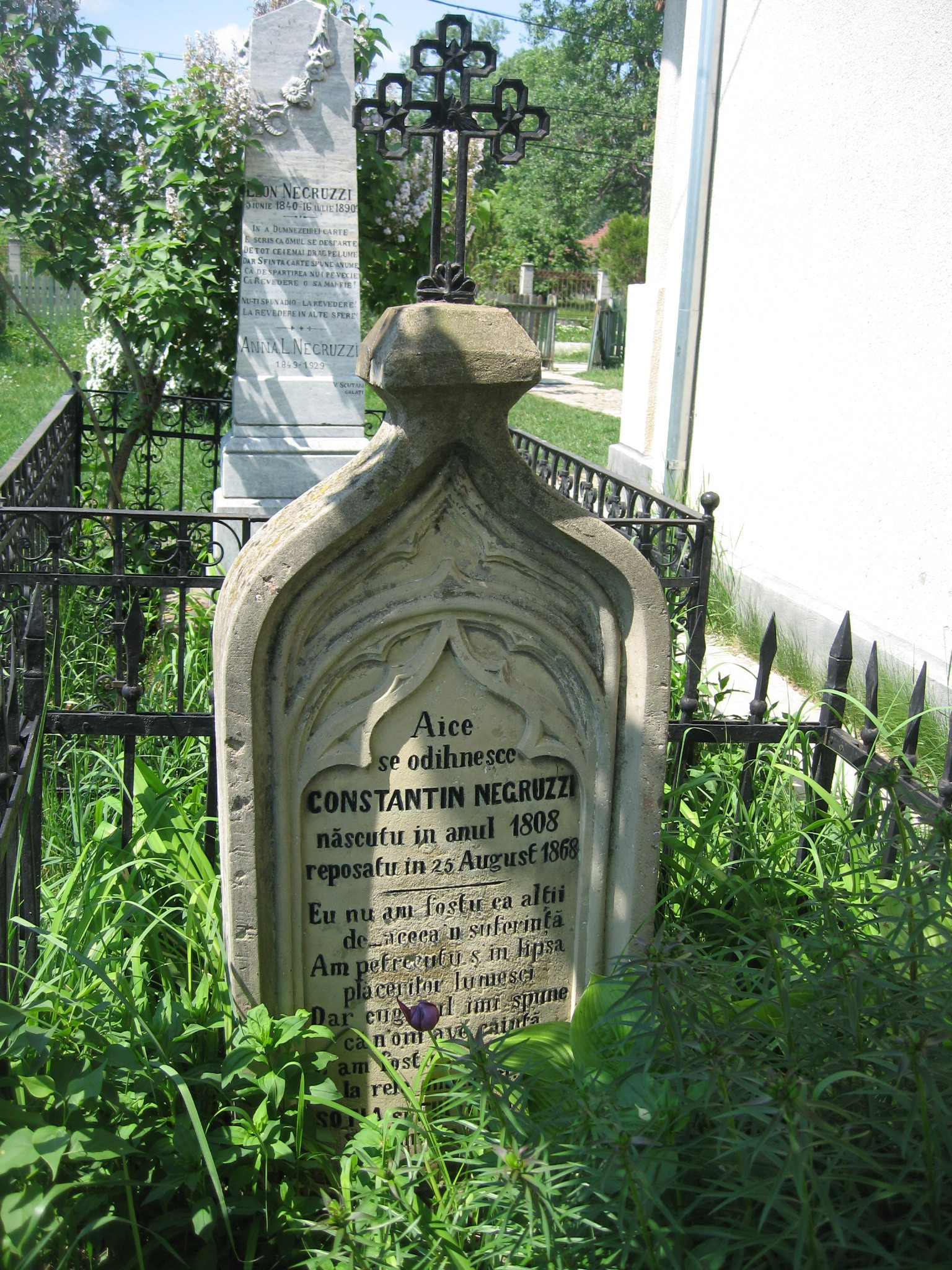
The neogothic tombstone of Negruzzi from the Saints Constantine and Helen Church.

The prose works are divided into three groups, baptized with the general title of "Păcatele tinerețelor" (Sins Of The Youth) (1857). The first includes "Amintirile din junțe" (Memories From The Youth), several stories, some of which are personal, for example "Zoe" (1829) and "O alergare de cai" (A Horse Run) (1840), short stories in which the plot is well-conducted and full of interest, and the language is Romanian and with apt expressions. The "Fiziologia provinţialului" (Physiology of the Provincial) represents perhaps the best physiology written in the Romanian language.

Also in this group is the story "Toderică, jucătorul de cărţi " (Toderica, the Card Player) (1844), loosely based on Prosper Mérimée's short story of "Federigo". It is about a card player who had lost all his fortune, and once hosted Jesus Christ and Saint Peter, and obtained three things as a reward: the cards he had in his hand were given a power that would always bring Toderica a profit, the tree at his door was to be such that whoever climbed it could not get down without Toderica's will, finally a chair was also blessed so that whoever sat on it could not get up without Toderica's will. With these means he made a great fortune, escaped death several times and, finally, when he died, he managed to enter heaven through his cunning. This innocent joke, which Negruzzi himself tells that was printed more to fill the columns of the magazine than with any literary pretensions, so upset the clergy and administration of that time (1844) that they sent him into exile to a monastery, as the Propășirea magazine was suspended.

Among the fragments that make up the second group, the most significant work is the novel of "Alexandru Lăpușneanul", published in Dacia Literară in 1840, one of the reference short stories of Romanian literature. The short story is composed of four parts, each bearing a motto, which is its theme. Iacob Heraclid, known as Despot Vodă, had been killed by Ștefan Tomșa, who had become lord of Moldavia; Alexandru Lăpușneanu, who had reigned once before, comes with Turkish troops to regain possession of the throne.

The third group of Negruzzi's writings is formed by "Scrisorile" (The Letters), with over 30 pieces. In some there are critical and satirical observations on the customs of society; in others notes on various writers (Scavin, Alexandru Donici), in others personal memories or stories from the history of the country. The tone is generally humorous, appropriate for this genre even when it deals with serious issues and deals with such issues as those regarding spelling and language. The letters were published antum in the volume "Negru pe alb" (Black on White).

Negruzzi takes part in discussions with Ion Heliade Rădulescu and the Transylvanians and presents, right from the first years of this struggle, the most correct point of view. These letters are a rich source of information of all kinds, which cannot be missed by anyone who wants to know the social and cultural life of the era between 1838 and 1839.

Negruzzi also wrote theatre plays. It is well-known that he was one of those who started the movement in 1840, thus, putting the early bases of the Romanian Theatre. For this, he translated from French and also wrote original works - weak in dramatic design, but with funny satirical passages: "Cârlanii", a one-act vaudeville (1857) and "Muza de la Burdujeni" (The Muse From Burdujeni) (1850), in which he aims to ridicule purists and neologisms.

Negruzzi's most notable work, the historical short story of "Sobieski și românii" (Sobieski and the Romanians) appears in the "Calendar for the Romanian People for the Year 1845", in Iași, republished in 1857, also in the capital of Moldova, in the volume "Păcatele tinerețelor" (The Sins Of The Youth).

== See also ==
- Costache Negruzzi National College
