= Maria Cicherschi Ropală =

Romanian doctor and professor

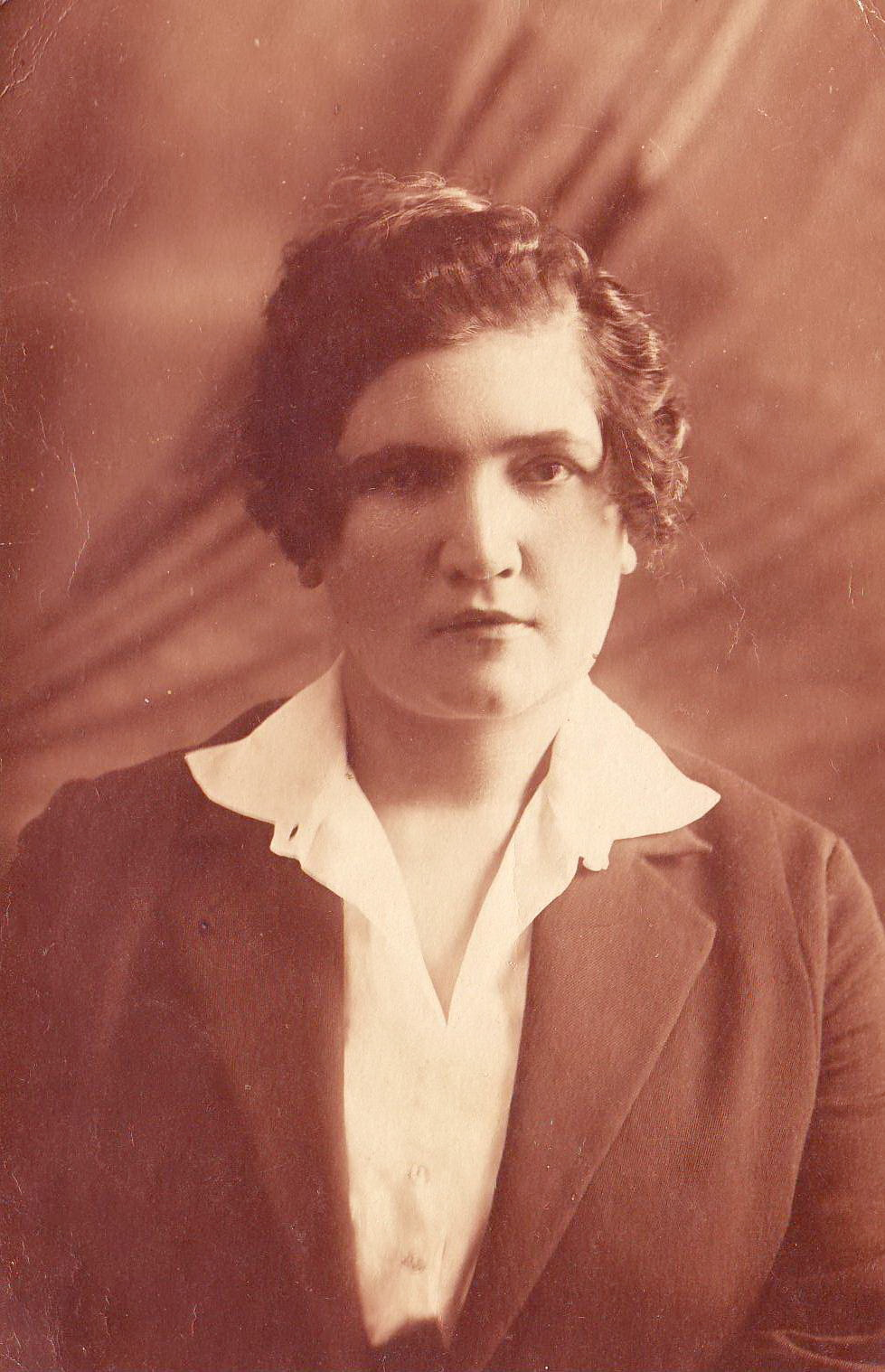
- Ropală in 1923
- Born: Maria Cicherschi; 1881; Iași, Kingdom of Romania
- Died: 1973 (aged 91–92)
- Resting place: Bellu Cemetery, Bucharest, Romania
- Education: University of Iași
- Occupation: Forensic physician
- Known for: First female coroner in Europe
- Spouse: Emil Ropală
- Children: Carmen Ropală-Gasparovici
- Scientific career
- Workplaces: Institute of Medicine and Pharmacy
- Thesis: Contributions to the biological study of female crime from a forensic point of view (1907)
- Doctoral advisor: George Bogdan

Maria Cicherschi Ropală (1881–1973), was a Romanian medical examiner and a professor at the Institute of Medicine and Pharmacy in Iași. She was the first female coroner in Europe.

== Biography ==
Maria Cicherschi was born in 1881 in Iași, Romania, the daughter of Eleonora Andoniu (daughter of Dimitrie Andoniu) and Frantz Cicherschi.

She graduated from the Oltea Doamna High School for Girls in Iași in 1902 and attended courses of the Faculty of Medicine of the University of Iași. She obtained the title of "Doctor of Medicine" in 1907 with the thesis titled "Contributions to the biological study of female crime from a forensic point of view" completed under the direction of Professor George Bogdan, president of the Society of Physicians and Naturalists.

=== Career ===
After finishing medical school, she went to work in the hydrotherapy laboratory of the baths in the Slănic-Moldova spas, then as a doctor in several communities in the country's south. She also worked in the Red Cross Society of Romanian Ladies, during military campaigns of World War I, which caused her to enlist as a doctor at the front.

In 1919, Ropală was appointed assistant at the Department of Forensic Medicine of the Faculty of Medicine in Iași. She later completed internships in Paris with professors Victor Balthazard (forensic medicine) and Henri Claude (forensic psychiatry) becoming "the first woman-forensic physician in Europe, and among the first in the world".

After returning to Romania, she was appointed foreman and forensic doctor of the Iași Court of Justice where she worked for 20 years. She helped Bogdan with the production of his first treatise on forensic medicine and taught at the university. In 1930, after Bogdan's death, she took over the management of the department.

Ropală was a member of the French Society of Forensic Medicine.

=== Personal life ===
She married Dr. Emil Ropală and they had a daughter, Carmen Ropală-Gasparovici (1911–1992).

Ropală died in 1973 and is buried in Bellu Cemetery, with the tombstone saying: "Maria Ropală Cicherschi – the first female forensic scientist in Europe".
