= Ionuț Moisă =

Romanian professional footballer

Personal information
- Full name: Ionuț Andrei Moisă
- Date of birth: 7 February 2002 (age 24)
- Place of birth: Iași, Romania
- Position: Midfielder

Youth career
- Politehnica Iași

Senior career*
Years	Team	Apps	(Gls)
2021–2022	Politehnica Iași	4	(0)
- * Club domestic league appearances and goals as of 14:26, 12 December 2022 (UTC)

Ionuț Andrei Moisă (born 7 February 2002) is a Romanian professional footballer who plays as a midfielder. He made his Liga I debut on 18 January 2021, in a match between Politehnica Iași and FC Voluntari, won by Botoșani, score 1–0.
