= Trifești, Iași =

Trifești
- Commune
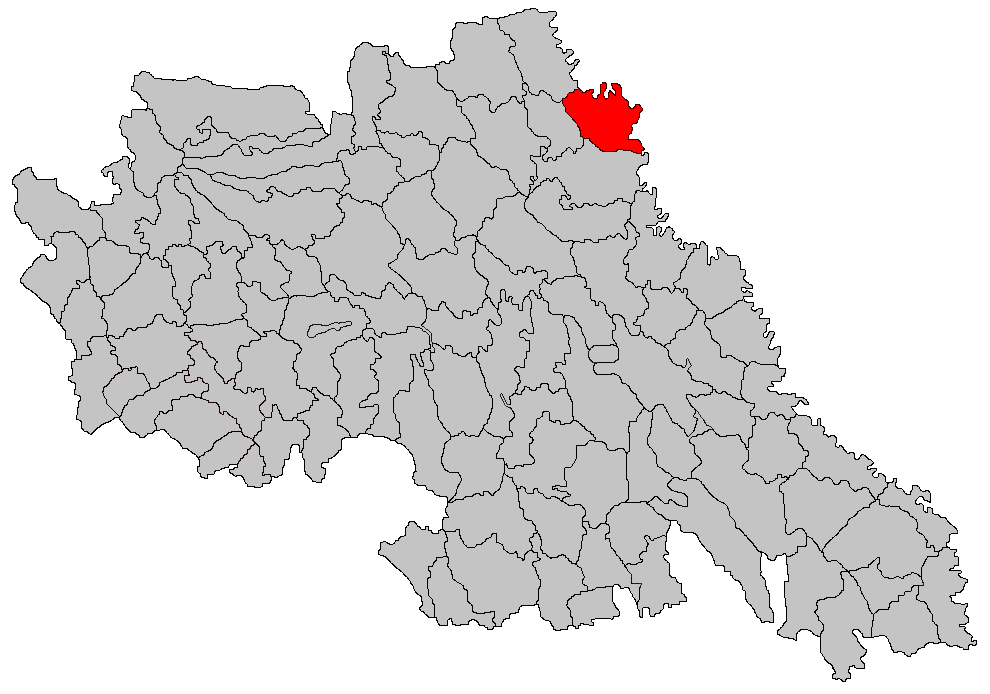
- Location in Iași County

- Location in Romania
- Coordinates: 47°27′N 27°30′E
- Country: Romania
- County: Iași
- Subdivisions: Trifești, Hermeziu, Vladomira, Zaboloteni

Government
  - Mayor (2024–2028): Paul-Nicolae Ivănucă (PNL)
- Area: 64.97 km^{2} (25.09 sq mi)
- Elevation: 60 m (200 ft)
- Population (2021-12-01): 3,425
  - Density: 53/km^{2} (140/sq mi)
- Time zone: EET/EEST (UTC+2/+3)
- Postal code: 707520
- Area code: +40 x32
- Vehicle reg.: IS
- Website: primariatrifestiiasi.ro

Trifești is a commune in Iași County, Western Moldavia, Romania. It is composed of four villages: Hermeziu, Trifești, Vladomira and Zaboloteni.

Hermeziu village was the ancestral home of the Negruzzi family.
