= Liviu Cangeopol =

Liviu Cangeopol (born March 28, 1954) is a Romanian writer, journalist, and political analyst.

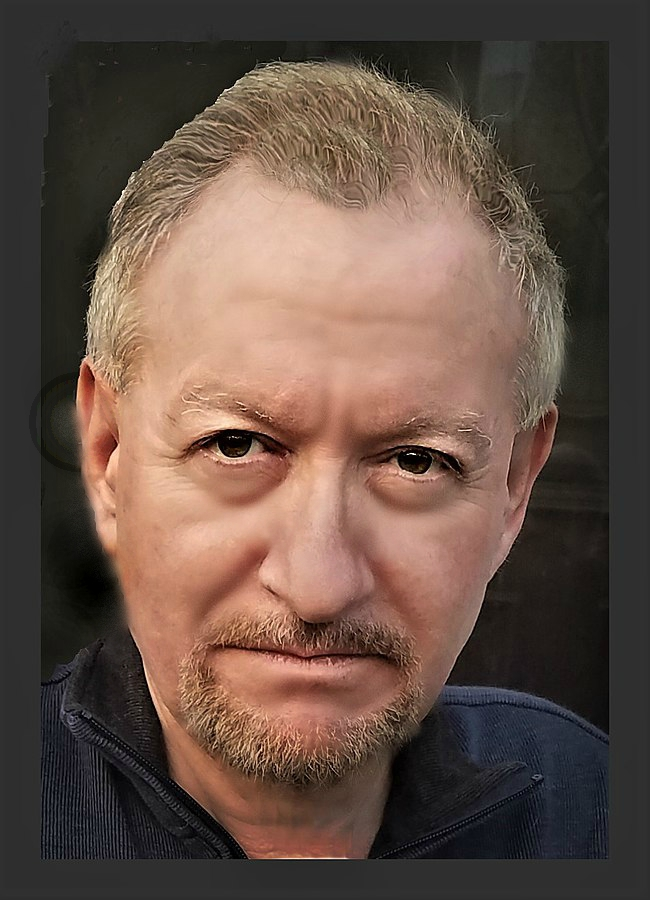

== Biography ==
Born in Iași, Liviu Cangeopol studied Languages and Literature at the University of Iași and Accounting and Business Administration in New York City and Atlanta. He made his writing debut in Dialog Magazine (1978). Cangeopol published his anti-communist book while living under the Romanian Communist Regime (this was an extremely dangerous and rare act, at the time). The book, titled What Else Could Be Said – Free Discussions in an Occupied Country (1989—Agora-USA, 1990—Minerva Publishing House, 2000—Nemira Publishing House) was co-authored with Dan Petrescu.

- Cangeopol's book is a vehement judgment against the Romanian Communist Regime and its former president, Nicolae Ceaușescu.

It remains the best critical analysis of the Communist system written in Romania before the fall of the regime. "Narratives Unbound: Historical Studies in Post-communist Eastern Europe"

- In April 1988, Paris Daily Libération published an interview with Cangeopol, Be Satisfied Mr. President – Your Name will Remain in History. Broadcast on Radio Free Europe, Cangeopol's interview accused President Ceaușescu of violating human rights and free speech.
- In September 1989, just three months before the Romanian Revolution, Cangeopol immigrated to the United States with his wife, Lidia Cangeopol and one child.
- Liviu Cangeopol began his journalistic career in New York at Romanian Free World. He also published his work in other newspapers such as New York, Romanian Times, Cultural Observator, Contrapunct, Vatra, Flacăra Iașului, etc.
- Cangeopol has been an American citizen since 1996.
- He is one of the few Romanian human rights activists whose name appears in Pace of Democratic Reforms and Status of Human Rights in Eastern Europe, written by United States Congress. House Committee on Foreign Affairs. Subcommittee on Human Rights and International Organizations. (U.S. G.P.O., 1990)
- After the fall of the communist regime, Cangeopol's name was included in Romanian History text books.
- On December 18, 2006, the new Romanian President, Traian Băsescu, while presenting a report condemning the acts of the former Communist regime, extended special appreciations to Cangeopol and to six others for the integrity and courage in their fight for justice under the communist regime.
- On January 31, 2020, Cangeopol received the title, Citizen of Honor of his hometown, Iași.

== Published books ==
- The Light in a Reversed Mirror , (Humanitas, Publishing House, 2026)
- Instead of What's Left , (Integral, Publishing House, 2024)
- The Journey, (Integral, Publishing House, 2024)
- Tears of Angel, (Junimea, Publishing House, 2023)
- The World Behind the Glass, (Integral, Publishing House, 2023)
- The Dream's End, (Integral, Publishing House, 2022)
- Evanescent, (Integral, Publishing House, 2022)
- The Return of Seasons, (Integral, Publishing House, 2021)
- Avatar solstice, (Integral, Publishing House, 2020)
- The War of Deceptions, (Integral, Publishing House, 2020)
- Commissioner Cordobina, (Integral, Publishing House, 2020)
- Crazy Pandemic – Confessions in a state of emergency, (Integral, Publishing House, 2020)
- The quantum pulse, (Integral, Publishing House, 2020)
- Exercise of Forgetfulness, (Integral, Publishing House, 2019)
- Trilogy of Passing, (Brumar Publishing House, 2019)
- Imponderable – Journal to the end of night, (Integral, Publishing House, 2018)
- The Virtue of Appearances, (Institutul European – Publishing House, 2016)
- The Calm Collected in the Storm, (Cartea Românească – Publishing House, 2013)
- The Smile – A Portrait of Seashore at Dusk, (Humanitas Publishing House, 2007)
- What Else Could Be Said – Free Discussion in an Occupied Country, (co-author Dan Petrescu) (1989—Agora-USA, 1990—Minerva Publishing House, 2000—Nemira Publishing House).

== Other references ==
- Dictators and Dictatorships – Page 157
- Intellectuals and Politics in Central Europe – Page 64
- Revolution and Resistance in Eastern Europe: Challenges to Communist Rule – Page 99
- Narratives Unbound: Historical Studies in Post-communist Eastern Europe – Page 403
- Peace of Democratic Reforms - https://books.google.com/books?id=JB74x_0fp-8C&focus=searchwithinvolume&q=cangeopol]
- Dissent and Opposition in Communist Eastern Europe: Origins of Civil Society ... – Page 158
- Research on the Soviet Union and Eastern Europe/1990 – Page 102
- Stalinism for all seasons – Page 214
- Cartea săptămânii: Imponderabil - https://amosnews.ro/cartea-saptamanii-imponderabil-2019-02-14
- Imponderabil - Observator Cultural - https://www.observatorcultural.ro/articol/proze/
- Samizdat, Tamizdat, and Beyond: Transnational Media During and After Socialism - edited by Friederike Kind-Kovács, Jessie Labov - https://books.google.com/books?id=fVJFAAAAQBAJ&dq=liviu+cangeopol&pg=PA135 ]
- A History of Modern Political Thought in East Central Europe: By Balázs Trencsenyi, Michal Kopeček, Luka Lisjak Gabrijelčič, Maria Falina, Mónika Baár, and Maciej Janowski - https://books.google.com/books?id=SflyDwAAQBAJ&dq=liviu+cangeopol&pg=PA137 ]
- East European Reporter - https://books.google.com/books?id=QrNWAAAAYAAJ&q=liviu+cangeopol ]
- Citizen of Honors Award - Liviu Cangeopol, Iasi, Romania https://infoiasionline.ro/premierea-celui-de-al-patrulea-cetatean-de-onoare-al-municipiului-iasi-pe-ordinea-de-zi-a-consilierilor-in-sedinta-de-astazi/64215/
