= Alexandra Cornilescu =

Romanian linguist (born 1947)

Alexandra Cornilescu (born 6 August 1947 in Iași) is a Romanian linguist who works in the framework of generative grammar. She is professor at the Faculty of Foreign Languages and Literatures of the University of Bucharest.

== Career and honours ==
Cornilescu spent her entire career at the University of Bucharest, initially as junior lecturer (1970), then was subsequently promoted to senior lecturer (1977), associate professor (1992), and finally full professor (1996). From 1990 to 2004 she was head of the Department of English at the University of Bucharest, and from 2004 to 2012 she was dean of the Faculty of Foreign Languages and Literatures. She has also held international visiting and short-term positions at the University of California at Berkeley (1972–3), Duke University (1992–3), Ca' Foscari University of Venice (1994–5), Paris Diderot University (2000, 2002), and Tilburg University (2005).

In 2015, Cornilescu was awarded the Timotei Cipariu Prize of the Romanian Academy for Volume 1 of the Reference Grammar of Romanian, on which she was a coauthor. In 2016 she was elected Member of the Academia Europaea. In 2022 she was the recipient of a festschrift, A life in linguistics: a festschrift for Alexandra Cornilescu on her 75th birthday.

== Research ==
Cornilescu's research has focused on the formal syntax and semantics of English and Romanian, and she is the author of ten books in these areas. Her most cited works deal with aspects of Romanian syntax such as the double subject construction, prepositional accusative, nominalizations, and determiners. She (co-)contributed chapters on the adjective and on deverbal nouns to the Reference Grammar of Romanian (2013).

== Selected publications ==
- Cornilescu, Alexandra. 1992. Remarks on the determiner system of Rumanian: the demonstratives al and cel. Probus 4 (3), 189–260. doi:10.1515/prbs.1992.4.3.189
- Cornilescu, Alexandra. 1995. Concepts of modern grammar: a generative grammar perspective. Bucharest: Editura Universității din București. ISBN 9789735750091
- Cornilescu, Alexandra. 2000. The double subject construction in Romanian. In Virginia Motapanyane (ed.), Comparative studies in Romanian syntax, 83–133. Leiden: Brill. ISBN 9780080438719
- Cornilescu, Alexandra. 2000. Notes on the Interpretation of the Prepositional Accusative in Romanian. Bucharest Working Papers in Linguistics 2 (2), 91–106.
- Cornilescu, Alexandra. 2001. Romanian nominalizations: Case and aspectual structure. Journal of Linguistics 37 (3), 467–501. doi:10.1017/S0022226701001074
