= Jennie Moscowitz =

American actress (1867/1868–1953)

Jennie Moscowitz (1867 or 1868 – July 26, 1953) was an American actress who was known for portraying Jewish mothers and was "equally well known on the English and Yiddish stages".

== Early years ==
Moscowitz was born in Iași, Romania. Her father was a tutor at court, and she attended the Conservatoire de Declamation in Iași, the only Jewish student there at that time. She was the oldest of four children.

== Career ==
Moscowitz debuted on stage in Iași when she was 13 years old, portraying Nanine in a production of Camille, a command performance for Romania's king and queen. It starred Sarah Bernhardt, "who took such a liking to the girl that she guided her professionally for the next five years."

Moscowitz came to the United States as part of a troupe assembled by two Russian impresarios. She acted in supporting roles with the Jewish Art Theatre and learned English while doing so, thus gaining access to English-speaking roles. Her Broadway debut was in The Melting Pot, and her "first notable success on the English-speaking stage" was in The Auctioneer, in which she acted for six seasons. For another six seasons she portrayed Mrs. Potash in Potash and Perlmutter on Broadway and around the United States. She acted two more years in Partners Again, a sequel to Potash and Perlmutter. Moscowitz's other Broadway credits included The Treasure, Partners Again), Kosher Kitty Kelly, The Song Writer, The Wooden Soldier, Excursion, and Counsellor-at-Law.

Explaining her success in the theater, Moscowitz said, "If I tried to act, I wouldn't be worth a nickel to a producer. It's because I behave like myself, like a real Jewish mother -- and that's what I am in private life -- that the people like me." Her sons tried to dissuade her from performing in a revival of the play Counsellor-at-Law, which came during her 60th year on stage. They relented after she told them, "I love it. I want to do it. It's my life."

On radio, Moscowitz starred in the serials The Awakening and My Boy and was active as a dialectician.

== Personal life and death ==
Jennie and Max Moscowitz married in 1888. He operated the Eldorado, the first Jewish variety theater in New York City, and after they married he managed her career for many years. They had two sons and a daughter.

He died in 1947. She died on July 26, 1953, in a home for the aged in the Bronx, New York City, aged 85.

== Papers ==
The Jennie Moscowitz papers are housed at the New York Public Library. The collection includes correspondence, personal papers, and scripts related to her career and her private life.
