= Anastasie Panu =

Moldavian, later Romanian politician

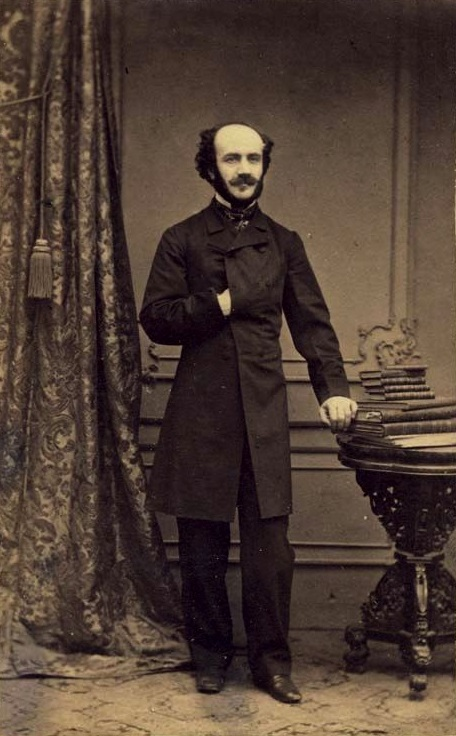
Anastasie Panu

Anastasie Panu (1810–1867) was a Moldavian, later Romanian politician.

== Biography ==
Born and educated in Iași, Panu spent many years in Huși, where around 1845 he was named tribunal member, later rising to president. In 1847, his political support for Lascăr Rosetti led Prince Mihail Sturdza to dismiss Panu, detaining him at the Galați barracks for three months. Implicated in the 1848 Revolution, he was again arrested.

After Sturdza fell from power, Panu moved to Iași. In 1852, Prince Grigore Alexandru Ghica named him department head at the Justice Ministry, and later interim minister. Panu was elected to represent Iași in the ad hoc Divan. He was part of an eleven-member committee charged with implementing the union of the Principalities. Near the end of its independent existence, he was one of three Caimacams who led Moldavia. During the rule of Alexandru Ion Cuza, he held a Iași seat in the Chamber of Deputies. From January to September 1861, while Wallachia and Moldavia still had separate governments, he was prime minister of Moldavia, also serving as Interior Minister.

Panu died in Vienna.
