= Max Landesberg =

Romanian physician

Max Landesberg (1840 – 4 March 1895) was a Romanian physician and oculist.

He was born to a Jewish family in Iași in 1840. He was educated at the gymnasium at Ratibor and at the University of Berlin (M.D. 1865). After a postgraduate course under Graefe, Landesberg went to the United States, where he practised in New York and Philadelphia. He was the American editor of the Revue d'Ophthalmologie of Paris.

In 1894, he moved to Florence, Italy, dying there the next year.

== Publications ==
- De blennorrhoea neonatorum (Thesis). University of Berlin. 1865.
- Beiträge zur variokösen Ophthalmie. Elberfeld: Bädeker. 1874.
- Zur Statistik der Linsenkrankheiten. Cassel: T. Fischer. 1876.
- On the Etiology and Prophylaxis of Blindness. New York: William Wood & Co. 1878. Archived from the original on 12 November 2022.
