= Margareta Xenopol =

Romanian composer, pianist and singer

Margareta Xenopol (28 January 1892 – 8 July 1979) was a Romanian composer, pianist and singer. She was the daughter of historian and author Alexandru Dimitrie Xenopol.

== Life ==
Xenopol was born in Iași, on 28 January 1892. She was the daughter of historian and author Alexandru Dimitrie Xenopol. She initially studied piano with Margareta Sakellary from 1902 to 1907, and then with Aspasia Sion Burada. She studied with Walter Bachmann in Dresden, Germany. She studied voice with Alexandru Zirra, harmony and music theory with Paul Constantinescu, and composition and counterpoint with Martin Negrea in Bucharest. Romanian opera singer Elena Cernei recorded several of Xenopol's songs.

== Works ==
Her compositions include:

=== Chamber ===
- Elegy (cello and piano)

=== Piano ===
- Classical Etude
- Concert Etude (1947)
- Dream of Columbine Waltz
- Idyll (1912)
- Melancholy Waltz
- Prelude
- Russian Suite (1950)
- Sonatina
- Theme and Variations

=== Vocal ===
- And for Your Black Eyes
- Autumn Song
- Blue Cigarette Smoke
- (The) Days Pass, But the Love Remains
- Four Romances
- I Am Watching You
- I Love Like I Never Loved
- I Wanted to Run Away from You
- Let's Go, Sailor (men's choir)
- Nocturne
- Prayer (text by Mihai Eminescu; choir)
- Psalm 19 (choir)
- Return
- Romance of the Heart (text by Ion Minulescu)
- Romances without Music
- Three Romances
- Why Do I Dream?
- You Forget Romance
