= George Bogdan =

Romanian physician and university professor

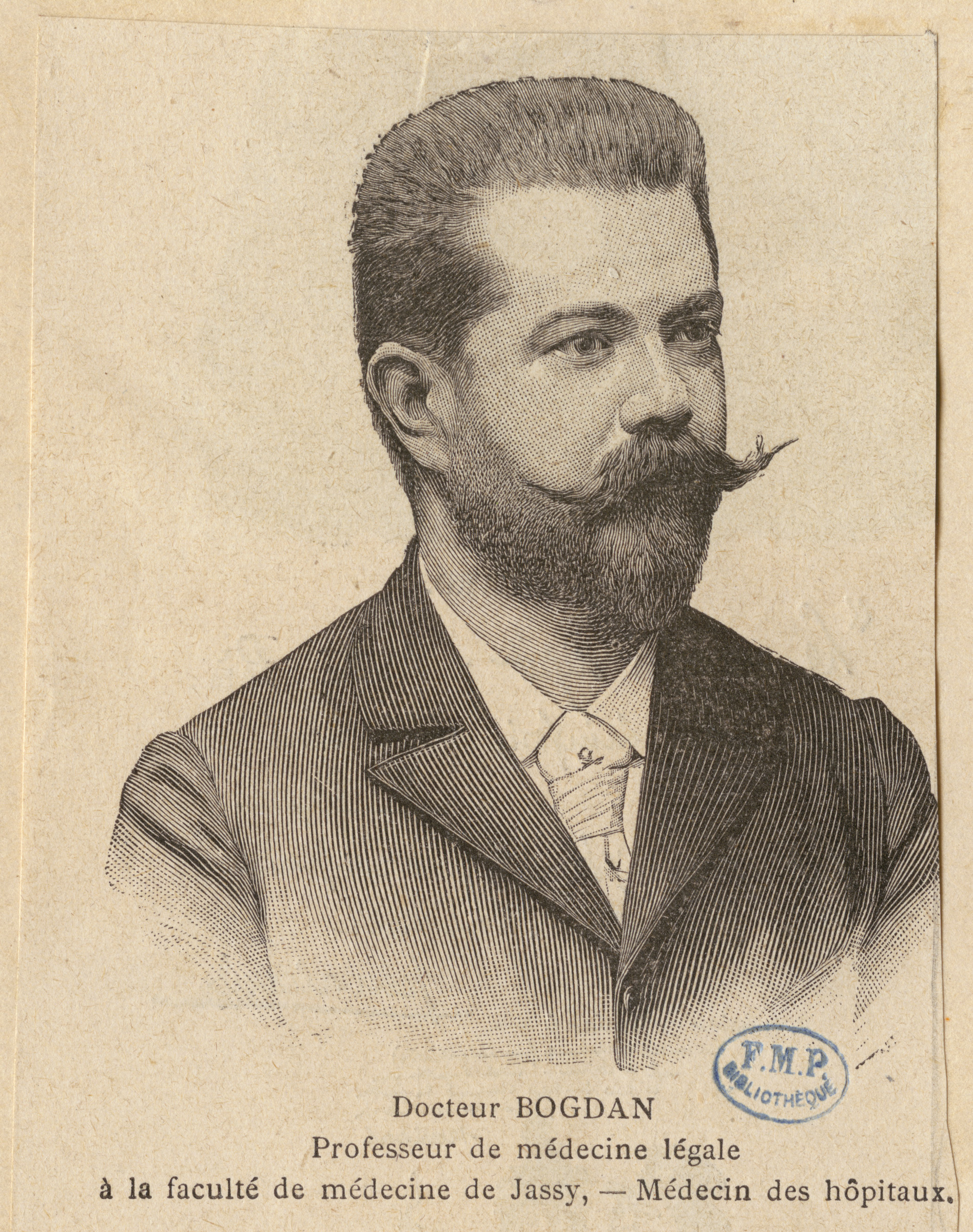

George Bogdan (1859–1930) was a Romanian physician and university professor.

Bogdan attended the National College in Iași, graduating in 1876. He studied medicine in France, and earned a doctorate in psychiatry there. After returning home, he began work as a doctor at Sfântul Spiridon Hospital and as a teacher at the National College, where he offered a course on hygiene. In 1891, he became a part-time professor at the forensic medicine department of the University of Iași. The same year, he was named dean of the medical faculty and a member of the university senate. As such, he argued for an increase in the number of departments at the faculty, for an improvement in its laboratories, for the establishment of a library, for scholarships for needy students, and for the creation of a student cafeteria. He became a full professor in 1895, and taught both advanced medical students and law students. He introduced the notion of medical ethics into the courses at his faculty. He taught that doctors should follow principles of honesty, modesty and deference; that they are morally responsible for their actions; and that irresponsibility is "a sad privilege of the sick and the insane".

He wrote a five-volume course on forensic medicine; this was considered the field's most up-to-date Romanian text at the time. He spent his entire career working as a coroner for the Iași tribunal. In 1915, for the benefit of other coroners, he edited a collection of 56 coroners' reports he had filed. He published widely across three decades, writing numerous works in the field of clinical practice based on his lifelong experience as a doctor in a dermatology and syphilis clinic. An active participant in international hygiene congresses, he focused on health education and preventive medicine. He performed experiments on animals as well as anthropometric measurements. He collected a wide array of exhibits for the museum of pathological forensic medicine, and was involved in forensic microbiology.

Bogdan was rector of the University of Iași from 1907 to 1913; as such, he proposed the establishment of a students' union, the establishment of new departments and the building of dormitories. In 1907, Maria Cicherschi Ropală, graduated with her Doctor of Medicine under his direction from the university.

He led the 50th anniversary celebrations in 1910 and strove to raise the university's prestige. A lover of literature, he was president of the local Franco–Romanian society, and published three short stories. He worked as a combat medic during the Second Balkan War (1913) and World War I and the subsequent wars (1916–1919), and was made a commander of the Legion of Honour.

== Notes ==
- Gheorghe Scripcaru, Eugen Târcoveanu, "George Bogdan", in Eugen Târcoveanu, Constantin Romanescu, Mihai Lițu (eds.), 125 de ani de învăţământ medical superior la Iași. Editura Gr. T. Popa, Iași, 2004, ISBN 978-973790-670-0
