= Dimitrie Alexandresco =

Dimitrie Alexandresco

Dimitrie Alexandresco (variant spelling of last name: Alexandrescu; 4 October 1850 in Iași – 1925) was a Romanian encyclopedist. The Center for Institutional Analysis and Development in Bucharest offers a scholarship honoring him. The Dimitrie Alexandresco Scholarship is designed for Law School Graduates and students of The National Institute of Magistracy.
