= Alexandru Dimitrie Xenopol =

Romanian historian (1847–1920)

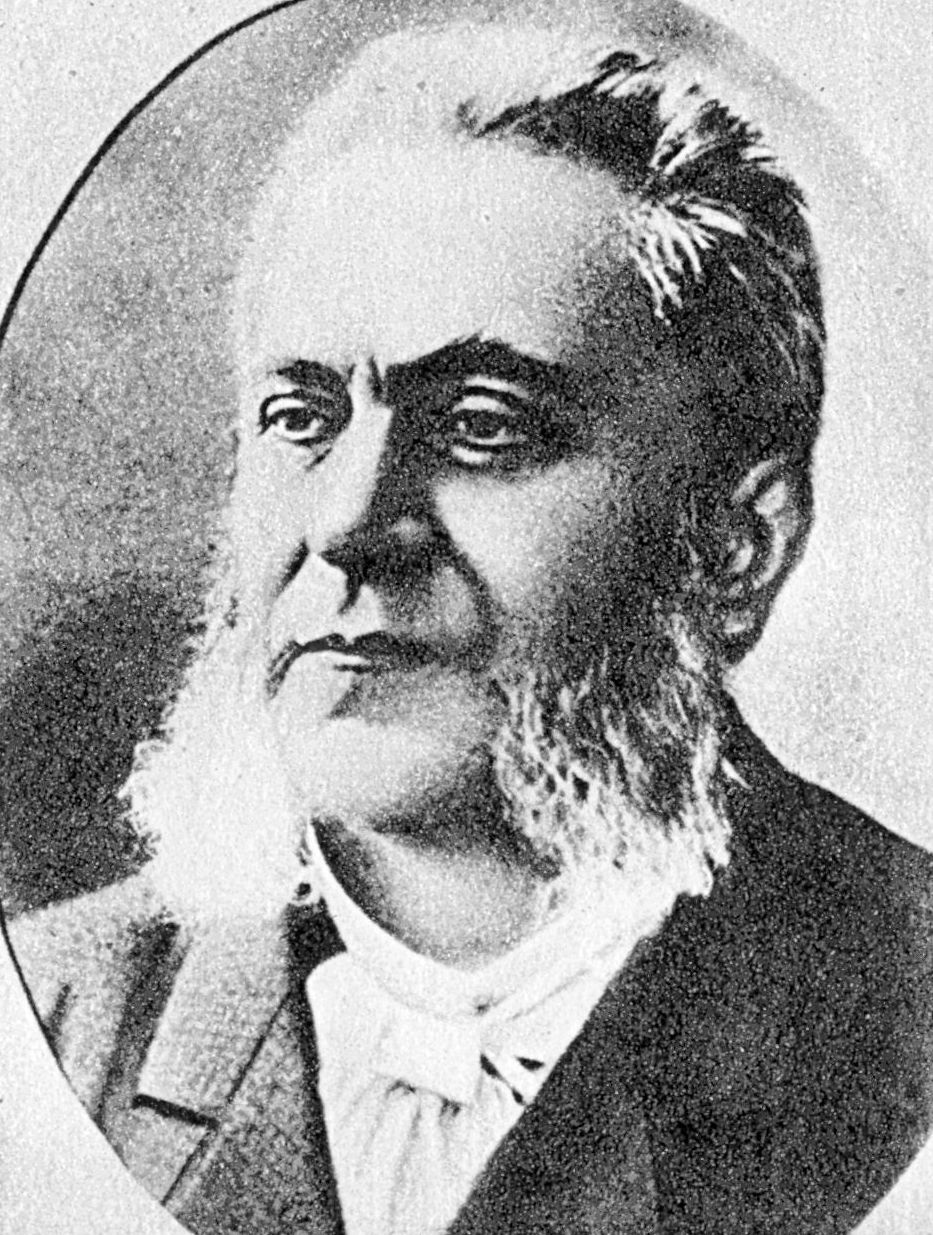
- Born: March 23, 1847; Iași, Moldavia
- Died: February 27, 1920 (aged 72)

Academic work
- Discipline: history
- Institutions: University of Iași
- Main interests: History of Romania
- Notable works: Les Principes fondamentaux de l'histoire Istoria românilor din Dacia-Traiană

Alexandru Dimitrie Xenopol (Romanian pronunciation: [alekˈsandru diˈmitri.e kseˈnopol]; March 23, 1847 – February 27, 1920) was a Romanian historian, philosopher, professor, economist, sociologist, and author. Among his many major accomplishments, he is credited with authoring the first major synthesis of the history of the Romanian people. His daughter Margareta Xenopol became a well-known Romanian composer.

== Life ==
Xenopol was born in Iași. His father was of Jewish origin and a convert to Eastern Orthodox Christianity, while his mother was of Greek origin. After he graduated from high school, he went on to Vienna in 1870 to study law and then to Berlin, where he studied philosophy. In 1868, he made his debut in Convorbiri Literare with a series of studies on Romanian traditions and on Romanian institutions.

At first, Xenopol served as a prosecutor in Iași, but he later decided to dedicate himself to the study of history. Starting in 1883, he was a professor of universal history at the University of Iași, where he served as rector from 1898 to 1901. He was elected member of the Romanian Academy in 1893.

In his 1899 French-language Les Principes fondamentaux de l'histoire ("The Fundamental Principles of History"), his work most well known internationally, he argued for history being a true science which follows clearly defined laws and logic, through which the reasons for historical processes could be clearly defined.

His six-volume Istoria românilor din Dacia-Traiană ("The History of the Romanians in Trajan's Dacia"), completed between 1888 and 1893, strongly asserts that the Romanians are of predominantly Roman origin – a position further elaborated by the historian Nicolae Iorga, one of Xenopol's numerous pupils (see Origin of the Romanians).

Concerning events nearly two millennia in the past and being supported by multiple archaeological findings, it was still contested by some historians. It had, however, very concrete political implications – the Roman origin implying that Romanians are inherently different from their Slavic and Magyar neighbors. This, despite his disagreement with radical nationalists and objection to violence against Jews, unfortunately also translated to Xenopol being a noted antisemite and collaborator of A. C. Cuza. Though he died before the formation of the Iron Guard, Romania's notorious Fascist party, he is considered to be one of its sources of inspiration – according to the final report of the International Commission on the Holocaust in Romania.

== Publications ==
- Despre învățământul școlar în genere și în deosebi despre acel al istoriei, Studii economice (1879)
- Istoria românilor (1879)
- Războiul dintre Ruși și Turci, 2 vols. (1880)
- Teoria lui Rösler (1884)
- Memoriu asupra învățământului superior în Moldova (1885)
- Etudes historiques sur les peuples roumains (1887)
- Istoria românilor din Dacia-Traiană, 6 vols. (1888–1893)
- Mihail Kogălniceanu (1895)
- Industria mătăsei (1896)
- Les Principes fondamentaux de l'histoire (1899) (in French)
- Unioniști și separatiști (1909)—this book is dedicated to the separatist (and unionist) movements in Romania, in particular the separatist feelings of Moldovans who wanted to become independent from Bucharest

== Sources ==
- Dimitrie R. Rosetti, Dicționarul contimporanilor, Editura Lito-Tipografiei "Populara", 1897
- Final Report of the International Commission on the Holocaust in Romania (p. 17, 27, 33, 45)
