= Iacob Negruzzi =

Moldavian and later Romanian poet and prose writer (1842–1932)

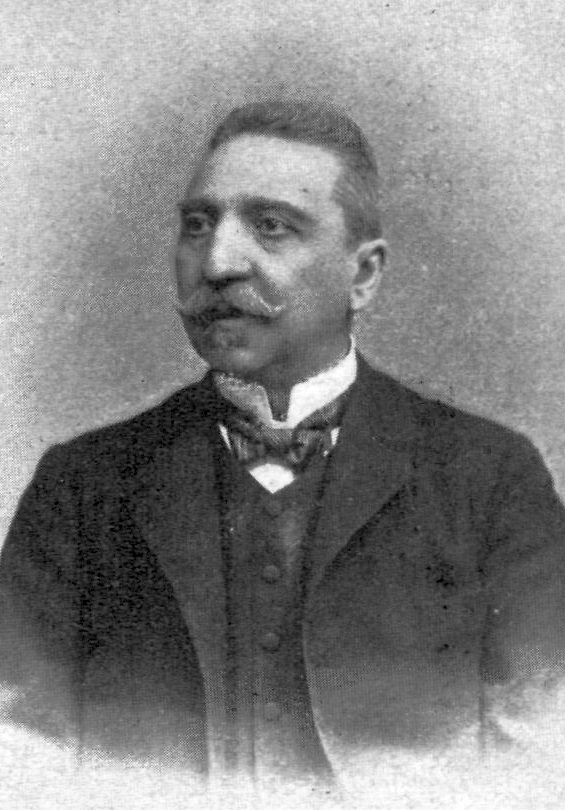
Iacob C. Negruzzi (1842–1932)

Iacob C. Negruzzi (December 31, 1842 – January 6, 1932) was a Romanian poet and prose writer.

== Biography ==
Born in Iași, he was the son of Constantin Negruzzi and his wife Maria (née Gane). Living in Berlin between 1853 and 1863, he attended high school, followed by the University of Berlin, from which he obtained a doctorate in 1863. He was a professor at the University of Iași from 1864 to 1884, and at the University of Bucharest from 1885 until his retirement in 1897. He was elected to the Assembly of Deputies in 1870, and later joined the Romanian Senate. He was elected a titular member of the Romanian Academy in 1881, was later its general secretary, and served three terms as Academy president: 1893–1894, 1910-1913 and 1923–1926. Negruzzi was among the founders of Junimea, and became its secretary in 1868. He played a very significant role as editor of Convorbiri Literare, ensuring the magazine's regular appearance by investing an immense amount of energy and making significant sacrifices, including material ones. He continued as editor for ten years after moving to Bucharest in 1885. He wrote reviews and notes in Convorbiri; published selections from Copii de pe natură (which appeared in book form in 1874), as well as the novel Mihai Vereanu (which appeared in 1873); and initiated a column called "Corespondență", probably the country's first true letter to the editor section. Negruzzi was a member of the Macedo-Romanian Cultural Society.

His press debut came in 1866, with a one-act play that appeared in Foaia Soțietății pentru Literatura și Cultura Română în Bucovina; his first book was the 1872 Poezii. Although written starting in 1889, Amintirile din "Junimea" was only published in 1921. He translated several plays by Friedrich Schiller (The Robbers, Fiesco and Intrigue and Love appeared in book form in 1871; The Maid of Orleans in Convorbiri Literare in 1883; Don Carlos and Mary Stuart in the last of his six-volume complete works that came out between 1893 and 1897). Other translations included Romantic poetry, both French (Victor Hugo) and German (Schiller and Heinrich Heine), published in Poezii.

His wife was Maria Rosetti.
