= Ioan Mire Melik =

Wallachian and Romanian polymath

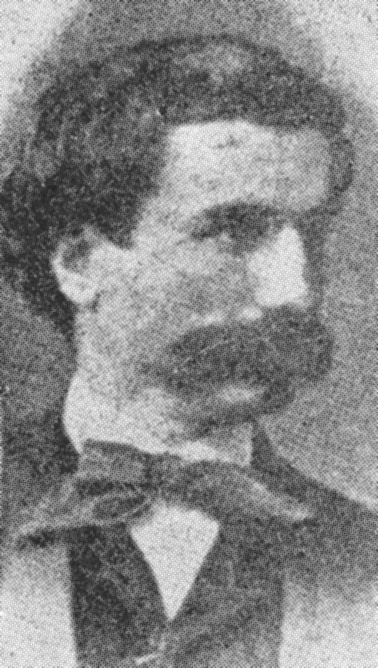
- Melik at Junimea, 1873
- Born: Iacob Ioan Miren Melik; August 9, 1840; Bucharest, Wallachia
- Died: January 29, 1889 (aged 48); Iași, Kingdom of Romania
- Education: École des Mines de Paris
- Awards: Bene Merenti medal 1st class (1880); Order of the Star of Romania (1884; declined)
- Scientific career
- Fields: Mathematics
- Workplaces: University of Iași

Ioan Mire Melik, or Melic (born Iacob Ioan Miren Melik; August 9, 1840 – January 29, 1889), was a Wallachian, later Romanian mathematician, educator and political figure, one of the early members of Junimea literary society. Known for his work in private education, and for his tenure at the University of Iași, he was the author of several early introductions to science—dealing with arithmetic and geometry, but also with topography and surveying. He was perceived as a bland figure at Junimea meetings, and had little to do with its literary agenda, but took care of administrative chores and, for a while, of its publishing venture. In his other job as headmaster of Institutele-Unite high school, where he employed poet Mihai Eminescu as a German-language teacher, he was regarded as remarkably stern, and had a publicized showdown with the students.

Taking his cue from the Junimist leadership, Melik followed the literary club as it transformed itself into a liberal conservative party. He represented Iași city in the Assembly of Deputies in the 1884 legislature, and then, under a Junimist government, helped enforce Titu Maiorescu's policies in the educational field. Melik is also remembered as an engineer and entrepreneur, who contributed to the modern history of Costeștii Botoșanilor village, his personal estate. He died of an unspecified disease at age 48, and was survived by his son Eugen, who followed in his footsteps as both a politician and an academic. Melik Jr was a leader of the Democratic Nationalist Party during and after World War I, but disappeared from public life after being exposed and sentenced as a confidence man.

== Biography ==
=== Early years ===
The future scientist was born in Bucharest, the Wallachian capital, on August 9, 1840 (although traditionally believed to have been born on August 15 or August 21, and wrongly credited in some documents as a "Iași native"). He was of Armenian origins: the Meliks traced their origin to Ohan, a Gregorian Armenian clergyman. As reported by the mathematician's son Eugen, they were recent immigrants from the Ottoman Empire, who had been scattered across the continents by mounting persecutions against their community; Boghos Yousefian, the Foreign Minister of Ottoman Egypt, was a close relative of the clan. Ioan's parents were Ohan's son, Arakel "Popovici" Melik, and his wife Maria Gedik; they had two other children: Gavril, a boy, and Anika, a girl. Ohan's other son, Iacob Melic, was a successful architect. The Ottoman statesman Mustafa Reshid Pasha recommended his work to the Wallachian government, but Iacob left the country and settled in Paris. From his new home, Iacob Melik corresponded with the exiled leaders of the 1848 Revolution, in particular the moderate and pro-Ottoman faction of Ion Ghica, Alexandru G. Golescu and Nicolae Pleșoianu.

To the end of his life, Ioan was listed as having "Armenian Gregorian nationality". According to his own testimony, he first attended the Armenian School in Bucharest's Yellow District, and then regular school in that same neighborhood. From 1854 to 1856, he completed secondary school at the Saint Sava College and was, in his own account, an award-winning student. From 1856, Iacob Melik took over the boy's education, taking him to Imperial France. Young Melik was tutored at a private boarding house (1857), before enlisting at the University of Paris Medical School, but changed his mind and applied for the École des Mines de Paris (1860). He finished school in 1864, and worked for a short while at salt mines in France and Belgium.

Melik's work took him to Moldavia, which, in 1859, had federated with Wallachia into the United Principalities. The regime of Domnitor Alexandru Ioan Cuza assigned him to inspect the Moldavian salt mines, at Slănic and Târgu Ocna. Known to his Iași colleagues and friends as Mirmilic, he began attending the Junimea club in 1865, being one of the outside sympathizers of the cause, and manifestly lacking literary ambitions. Iacob Negruzzi, the Junimea co-founder and biographer of its members, asserted: "[Melik was] once a passionate Junimist, but always kept silent." Negruzzi jokingly added that the standard estimate, according to which the maths teacher had uttered some 23 words at club meetings held between 1865 and 1880, was probably exaggerated in Melik's favor. Literary historian George Călinescu suggests that Melik, like astronomer Niculae Culianu or schoolteacher Pavel Paicu, only came to Junimea "out of devotion or for the sake of entertainment". The mathematician was notorious for not having published a single line in the Junimist tribune, Convorbiri Literare.

=== Junimist projects ===
With his Junimist credentials, Melik was made substitute Professor of Mathematics at Iași University (February 23, 1865). In parallel, he taught at a high school for young cadets. During October 1865, he joined a group of academics, also comprising Rector Titu Maiorescu, museum organizer Gheorghe Panaiteanu Bardasare, Culianu, and Negruzzi, in expressing support for Cuza's autonomous interpretation of Romanian vassalage—namely, his attitude toward the Ottoman overlords. Their open letter congratulated the Domnitor for not accepting to be scolded by Grand Vizier Fuad. Melik acquired university tenure in April 1866, shortly after Cuza's regime had been toppled by the "monstrous coalition" and replaced by a Princely Lieutenancy. In May, he was caught up in the riots at Iași, whereby the Free and Independent Faction signaled its opposition to a proposed naturalization of resident Jews. In a letter to Românul, Melik explained that he did not support the Factionalist platform, but had merely objected to the riots being quashed by the Romanian Land Forces, which reportedly ignored academic freedom. His protest against the arrest of a university colleague resulted in his temporary arrest, ending when the rectorate intervened in his favor.

Soon after, Melik became a conservative ally of the Junimist Rector Maiorescu, helping him do battle with the University's well connected Factionalists and the other left-liberal groups. As noted by Călinescu, the University's Junimist circle was formed around Professors Melik, Culianu, I. Negruzzi, Ioan Caragiani and Nicolae Mandrea, with Junimea itself being "a political get-together with some cultural aspects." Although still recognized as a secondary and inactive participant, Melik was involved on several early Junimist projects, and referred to by Maiorescu as the group's "banker". In addition to promoting Junimist goals at University, he participated in founding (and financing) the club's own private school, or "Academic Institute". He himself described the event as follows: "In summer 1866, I have founded the Academic Institute, in partnership with several colleagues, from both University and High School [that is, the National High School Iași]." Melik took personal care about furnishing the Institute, purchasing its books from prestigious companies such as Hachette, and keeping score of the more reliable publishing houses in Moldavia and Wallachia.

The institution itself left a mark on Romanian educational history, being seen as a model school in the field of private enterprise. It remains primarily noted for its contribution in Humanities, which were assigned to Maiorescu. Constantin Meissner, the dedicated student and future Junimist pedagogue, recalled: "we [students] found ourselves speaking, gesticulating, moving our heads just like our precious model [Maiorescu]." Another former student, and later teacher at the Institute, was scholar A. D. Xenopol. He describes his alma mater as "an eminent private school", and Melik as one of the "leading professorial forces" in Moldavia; he also credits Melik's "complete and measured exactitude" as influential for his own work ethic. According to Xenopol, Melik's refusal to tolerate staff truancy earned him a reputation as a strict colleague. Referencing an Armenian stereotype, the other Junimists began calling Melik a mindirigiu ("quilter") of their absences.

Melik was, with Vasile Pogor and Al. Farra, a manager of the literary club's own publishing company—a bankrupt project, since Pogor would only purchase books from his own area of interest. Before going down, this commercial branch of Junimea put out a number of general education works, including Melik's textbook Elemente de aritmetică ("Elements of Arithmetic"). Melik was also a cashier during Junimea anniversaries. Witnessing the decline of Junimist capital, he even proposed, unsuccessfully, that the club fortunes be invested in a salt mine. Melik was not dissuaded by the opposition, and continued to draft plans about investing Junimist money, forming a credit union, and opening up the Humpel girls' institute. His record of Junimea gains and expenses is seen by philologist Constantin Coroiu as evidence of Melik's "computer-like rigor". According to Negruzzi, Melik was an outstandingly passionate defender of Maiorescu's reputation. When the Junimist leader was framed a statutory rape scandal and taken to court, Melik provoked the judge to a duel, over not being allowed to enter the courthouse.

=== Institutele-Unite and Assembly mandate ===
On February 18, 1867, the Junimist mathematician was also admitted into the conservative wing of Romanian Freemasonry, or "Star of Romania" Lodge. This branch of the Oriental Rite of Memphis and the Grand Orient de France, wherein Pogor himself had reached the 90th Degree, had for its Iorgu Sutzu as its Venerable Master, and came to include most of the Junimist notabilities. On October 21 of the same year, Melik was granted the Fellow Craft Rank in Masonic orders. Noting the role of Junimist Masons in combating the liberals' stated xenophobia, researcher Mihai Dim. Sturdza suggests that the "Star of Romania" was in fact "a place of refuge, [...] where the foreign-born intellectuals [...] created a bloc with the conservative boyars and the Jewish merchants". Their main liberal detractors included senior academic Simion Bărnuțiu and other outspoken antisemites.

Melik's 1867 arithmetic course was highly popular, going through ten reprints. He followed up with other textbooks and introductory courses: Despre moneta română ("On the Romanian Currency", 1868); Elemente de Geometrie ("Elements of Geometry", 1869, ten reprints); Elemente de Topografie ("Elements of Topography", 1879, four reprints). From 1883 to 1888, Melik, Culianu and Constantin Climescu put out the magazine Recreații Științifice ("Scientific Recreations"), considered a direct precursor of the more prestigious Gazeta Matematică. The author continued his work at the Institute before and after 1875, when it merged with the "New High School" into the private-run Institutele-Unite ("Unified Institutes"); according to the former student Eugeniu Vincler, the complete merger only took place in 1879.

Also in 1875, Melik formalized his adoption by Iași city, by beginning construction work on a townhouse (completed 1882). He married a local, Roxandra. The new Domnitor, Carol I, recognized Melik's educational merits by granting him the Bene Merenti medal 1st class. However, according to Vincler, he was a "stern" headmaster, and managed to alienate the students by bringing in Mihai Eminescu to serve as their tutor in German; they resented Eminescu because of his cantankerousness and his harsh grading of students. A small-scale student revolt, which involved future socialist agitators Constantin Mille and Vasile Morțun, was curbed by Melik. According to one anecdotal account, he bent their will by ordering the cafeteria not to provide them with any food for the duration of their strike. Reflecting back on his participation in the scandal, Vincler expressed shame, noting that Eminescu had since been discovered as a poetic genius, and elevated into the national pantheon. Mille himself was spared expulsion after a personal interview with Melik, whom he knew, derisively, as Mustață-Roșie ("Red Mustache").

Melik was a distant witness to the Romanian War of Independence (1877–1878), which saw the country cut off her remaining ties of vassalage with the Ottoman monarchy; he collected the letters sent home by his relative, Captain Grigore Bănulescu, who had fought at Plevna. Shortly after the establishment of the Romanian Kingdom in 1881, Melik also made his way into the Junimist political party. Maiorescu, who led Junimea members in and out of the opposition Conservative Party, assigned him a place on the independent list for Iași in the election of 1884. In practice, Melik, Pogor, Negruzzi and others were in a cartel with the ruling National Liberals, and were elected deputies on a united pro-government list. A while after, with Premier Ion Brătianu ignoring repeated Junimist requests for cabinet positions, the entire faction moved back into the opposition. Carol I, the newly crowned King of Romania, again rewarded Melik's services: in February 1884, Monitorul Oficial published news that the mathematician had been made Officer of the Order of the Star of Romania; when later errata informed Melik that he was merely a Knight of that company, he refused to accept the award altogether.

=== Final appointments and death ===
Melik had given up his position as headmaster in 1884, when Climescu took over. He was still an active popularizer on scientific topics, publishing, in 1885, a surveying and ballistics tract: Equerulu grafometru sau quadrantulu de campania al D-lui Colonel de Artilerie A. Costiescu ("The Graphometer or Campaign Quadrant of the Artillery Colonel A. Costiescu"). In January 1886, România Liberă aired his polemic with the National Liberal Education Minister, Dimitrie Sturdza—he objected in particular to Sturdza's new grading system, which made students with one failing grade repeat the entire year. In 1888, Melik issued three new textbooks: Arithmetic for 3rd- and 4th-graders, Geometry for the primary course, and a Curs practic de Geometrie elementară ("Practical Course in Elementary Geometry"). By then, he had invested his money into a large-scale agricultural venture, on the Moldavian estate of Costeștii Botoșanilor. The purchase took place in March 1885. As he himself noted, 507 fálce of land (some 726 hectares) were exchanged for his 210,000 lei, cash. This was a third of the estate, as defined by tradition, and a half of the actual village.

In March 1888, after prolonged political infighting, Carol I turned his back on both the Conservatives and the National Liberals. The Junimists experienced a moment of triumph, with Theodor Rosetti as Premier and Maiorescu as Education Minister. For a while, Melik himself was Secretary General of the Education Ministry, his position at the University filled in by Ion Ralet. The Junimist loyalist was assigned by Maiorescu to inspect the Moldavian schools. Their common goal was to purge from the schooling system a new political threat: socialist activists. Melik was ordered to work only with the known anti-socialists, and to sack all those suspected of having affiliated with the socialist clubs. In one such letter, the Minister instructs his subordinate to inquire about whether the known Marxist Ioan Nădejde still had relatives working on a state salary.

In early 1889, still active as General Inspector of the Schools and Principal of Institutele-Unite, Melik was struck down with a quickly progressing illness. He died in his home at Iași on January 29, and was buried with military honors at Eternitatea cemetery; despite his lifelong Gregorian faith, the funeral service was Romanian Orthodox, delivered by the local Archiereus, Irimia Galățanu, at the Annunciation Church. The ceremony was entirely sponsored by the education ministry, with a credit line of 1,500 lei. His death was perceived as a tragedy by his fellow Junimists. Poet Anton Naum wrote, shortly after the events, "We have lost poor Melik in the space of 7 days, however good and healthy he had been. It left me with a hallowed heart, seeing that we were very close." The same Naum took over Melik's job at the inspectorate, in March 1889.

== Legacy ==
Melik's brief obituary in Familia magazine informed readers that the inspector's schoolbooks had "genuine value"; a homage was rendered by Institutele-Unite in September 1891, upon its silver jubilee. Later, the post-Junimist historiographer I. E. Torouțiu presented Melik as a highly moral man of action: "He was one of the society's devoted members, without ever asking it for perks [or] advancements, even though he was in a position to demand them, under the governments of his political friends." By 1978, when they were assigned entries in Ionel Maftei's dictionary of Iași-themed biographies, Melik and Naum were reportedly among the "picturesque and quite forgotten" subclass of Junimists.

The mathematician was survived by his widow and their four children, three of whom were daughters (four other children had died in infancy). Roxandra remained active as a philanthropist, and by 1908 was serving on the board of Maria Hinna's Pînea Săracilor charity. One of her and Ioan's daughters became the wife of Lieutenant Colonel Nicu Scorțescu. A former student of her father, he served with distinction in World War I and died in 1924, while leading the Romanian Police in Hotin County. Ioan's only surviving son, Eugen, took over his papers. Himself a graduate of Institutele-Unite, he was assigned as that school's headmaster in August 1898. He then became a substitute Law Professor at the University of Iași, beginning in 1903. Unable to complete his Ph. D., and complaining about the criteria for academic advancement, he finally resigned in September 1920. Melik Jr also built the towering landmark of Costeștii Botoșanilor, a castle-shaped vacation home; one half of the village is commonly known as Costești-Melic.

In parallel, Eugen became an establishment politician, serving as a Conservative deputy for Botoșani County in 1911. During the conflict opposing Petre P. Carp and Virgil Arion to Maiorescu, he sided with the former two and their "neo-Junimist" faction. He finally defected to the National Liberal caucus in 1913. During the second half of World War I, when southern Romania under German occupation, Melik was in Iași, which functioned as a provisional capital of the rump Romanian state. He joined Nicolae Iorga and A. C. Cuza's Democratic Nationalist Party (PND), and was designated a candidate for the Assembly in the scheduled elections of December 1918; his home also hosted the Committee for the Defense of Iași's Interests.

Upon the creation of Greater Romania, Melik Jr had become general secretary of the PND. His political career was cut short when he acquired infamy as a confidence man: in June 1924, the Ilfov County tribunal found him guilty of several counts of fraud, after he had illegally obtained control of a Bucharest townhouse from his late aunt Anika. Litigation over this issue, which resulted in Melik being imprisoned for eight months, was initiated by the Armenian Church, as one of the legal successors. In April 1932, he was again charged with fraud, due to his land speculation with Anika's estate in Tisău, and was ordered to pay reparations to his victims. He was living in Botoșani in March 1940, witnessing there the death of his wife Elena; they had two daughters, Ioana and Nicolița. His mother Roxandra died in August 1942, while in monastic seclusion at Agapia Monastery, and was buried next to her husband, at Eternitatea.
