= Constantin Corduneanu =

Romanian-American theologian

- Born: July 26, 1928; Potângeni, Iași County, Kingdom of Romania
- Died: December 26, 2018 (aged 90); Arlington, Texas, United States
- Citizenship: Romanian-American
- Education: University of Iași (Ph.D.)
- Scientific career
- Fields: Mathematics
- Workplaces: Alexandru Ioan Cuza University; Gheorghe Asachi Technical University of Iași; Ștefan cel Mare University of Suceava; University of Texas at Arlington
- Thesis: Probleme globale pentru ecuațiile diferențiale de ordin I și II (1956)
- Doctoral advisor: Ilie Popa
- Notable students: Mahmood Bijankhan

Constantin Corduneanu (July 26, 1928 – December 26, 2018) was a Romanian-American mathematician and professor of mathematics at the University of Texas at Arlington. In 2015, he was elected a titular member of the Romanian Academy; he was a corresponding member of the Academy since 1974.

== Biography ==
Corduneanu was born in Potângeni, Iași County, the son of Aglaea and Costache Corduneanu. From 1940 to 1947, he attended military high school in Iași and Predeal. In 1951, he graduated from the Faculty of Sciences of the University of Iași, Department of Mathematics. His teachers there included Alexander Myller, Octav Mayer, Mendel Haimovici, Dimitrie Mangeron, Ilie Popa, Gheorghe Gheorghiev, Alexandru Climescu, Ion L. Creangă, and Adolf Haimovici. Corduneanu received his Ph.D. in 1956 from the University of Iași with thesis Probleme globale pentru ecuațiile diferențiale de ordin I și II written under the supervision of Ilie Popa. The thesis defense the committee was composed of Miron Nicolescu, Grigore Moisil, and Nicolae Teodorescu.

From 1949 to 1977 he was a faculty member at the University of Iași, advancing in rank to full professor, and serving as Dean of the Faculty of Mathematics (1968–1972) and pro-rector (1972–1973 and 1974–1977). He also held faculty positions at the Gheorghe Asachi Technical University of Iași and at the University of Suceava, where he served as rector from 1966 to 1968.

In 1977, Corduneanu decided to leave Romania. He first went to Italy, where he taught some courses at the International Centre for Theoretical Physics in Trieste. In January 1978, he emigrated to the United States, and secured a teaching position at the University of Rhode Island (where he had been a visiting professor in 1967–1968 and 1973–1974). After spending a year as visiting professor at the University of Tennessee at Knoxville, he became a tenured professor in the fall of 1979 at the University of Texas at Arlington, where he taught until his retirement in 1996. He died at Medical City Arlington in 2018, at age 90.

A Festschrift in his honor, titled Mathematical Analysis With Applications, was published in 2018.

== Books ==
- Corduneanu, Constantin; Gheorghiu, N.; Barbu, Viorel (1968). Almost Periodic Functions. Interscience Tracts in pure and applied Mathematics. Vol. 22. New York-London-Sydney: John Wiley & Sons. MR 0481915. OCLC 874093704.
- Corduneanu, Constantin (2008) [1971]. Principles of Differential and Integral Equations. Providence, RI: American Mathematical Society. ISBN 978-1-4704-5348-0. OCLC 1154534646.
- Corduneanu, Constantin (1973). Integral Equations and Stability of Feedback Systems. Mathematics in Science and Engineering. Vol. 104. New York-London: Academic Press. ISBN 9780121883508. MR 0358245. OCLC 316566636.
- Corduneanu, Constantin (1991). Integral Equations and Applications. Cambridge University Press. ISBN 9780521340502. MR 1109491. OCLC 1024031605.
- Corduneanu, Constantin (2002). Functional Equations with Causal Operators. Stability and Control: Theory, Methods and Applications. Vol. 16. London: Taylor & Francis. ISBN 9780203166376. MR 1949578. OCLC 840377570.
- Corduneanu, Constantin (2009). Almost Periodic Oscillations and Waves. New York, NY: Springer-Verlag. doi:10.1007/978-0-387-09819-7. ISBN 9780387098197. MR 2460203. OCLC 1012499956.
- Corduneanu, Constantin; Li, Yizeng; Mahdavi, Mehran (2016). Functional Differential Equations: Advances and Applications. Pure and applied mathematics. Hoboken, New Jersey: Wiley. ISBN 978-1-119-18947-3. OCLC 1075891809.
