= Octav =

Octav is a Romanian male given name that may refer to:

- Octav Băncilă (1872–1944), Romanian realist painter
- Octav Botez (1884–1943), Romanian literary critic and historian
- Octav Botnar (1913–1998), businessman
- Octav Chelaru (born 1991), Romanian film director
- Octav Cozmâncă (born 1947), Romanian politician
- Octav Dessila (1895–1976), Romanian novelist and playwright
- Octav Mayer (1895–1966), Romanian mathematician
- Octav Onicescu (1892–1983), Romanian mathematician
- Octav Pancu-Iași (1929–1975), Romanian novelist and children's writer
- Octav Sargețiu (1908–1994), Romanian poet

== See also ==
- Octav (film), a 2017 Romanian drama film
