= Alexandru Ioan Cuza University =

University in Iași, Romania

Coordinates: 47.174231°N 27.571691°E

- Universitatea "Alexandru Ioan Cuza" din Iași
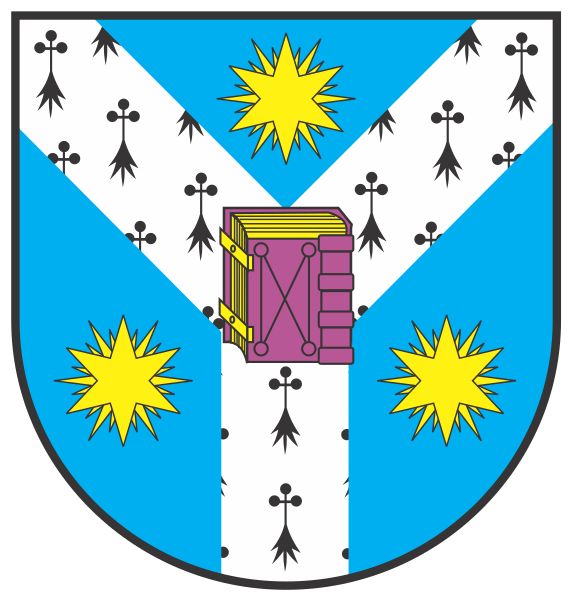
- Former names: University of Iași; Mihăileană University; Cuza Vodă University
- Motto: Per libertatem ad veritatem (Latin)
- Motto in English: Through freedom to the truth
- Type: Public
- Established: Academia Vasiliană: 1640; Princely Academy of Iași: 1707; Academia Mihăileană: 1835; Current institution: 26 October 1860; 165 years ago
- Affiliations: Coimbra Group (CG), Utrecht Network, European University Association (EUA), International Association of Universities (IAU), Agence universitaire de la Francophonie (AUF)
- Rector: Liviu-George Maha
- Academic staff: 1,723
- Students: 24,047 (2019–2020)
- Undergraduates: 18,594
- Postgraduates: 7,200
- Location: Iași, Romania
- Campus: Urban
- Colors: Yellow White and Sky Blue
- Website: www.uaic.ro

University rankings

Global – Overall
- QS World: 1001-1200 (2026)
- THE World: 1501+ (2024)
- USNWR Global: =1172 (2023)

The Alexandru Ioan Cuza University (Romanian: Universitatea "Alexandru Ioan Cuza"; acronym: UAIC) is a public university located in Iași, Romania. Founded by an 1860 decree of Prince Alexandru Ioan Cuza, under whom the former Academia Mihăileană was converted to a university, the University of Iași, as it was named at first, is one of the oldest universities of Romania, and one of its advanced research and education institutions. It is one of the five members of the Universitaria Consortium (the group of elite Romanian universities).

The Alexandru Ioan Cuza University offers study programmes in Romanian, English, and French. In 2008, for the third year in a row, it was placed first in the national research ranking compiled on the basis of Shanghai criteria.

The university is a member of some of the most important university networks and associations: the Coimbra Group (CG), Utrecht Network, European University Association (EUA), International Association of Universities (IAU), University Agency of Francophony (AUF), and the Network of Francophone Universities (RUFAC).

== History ==
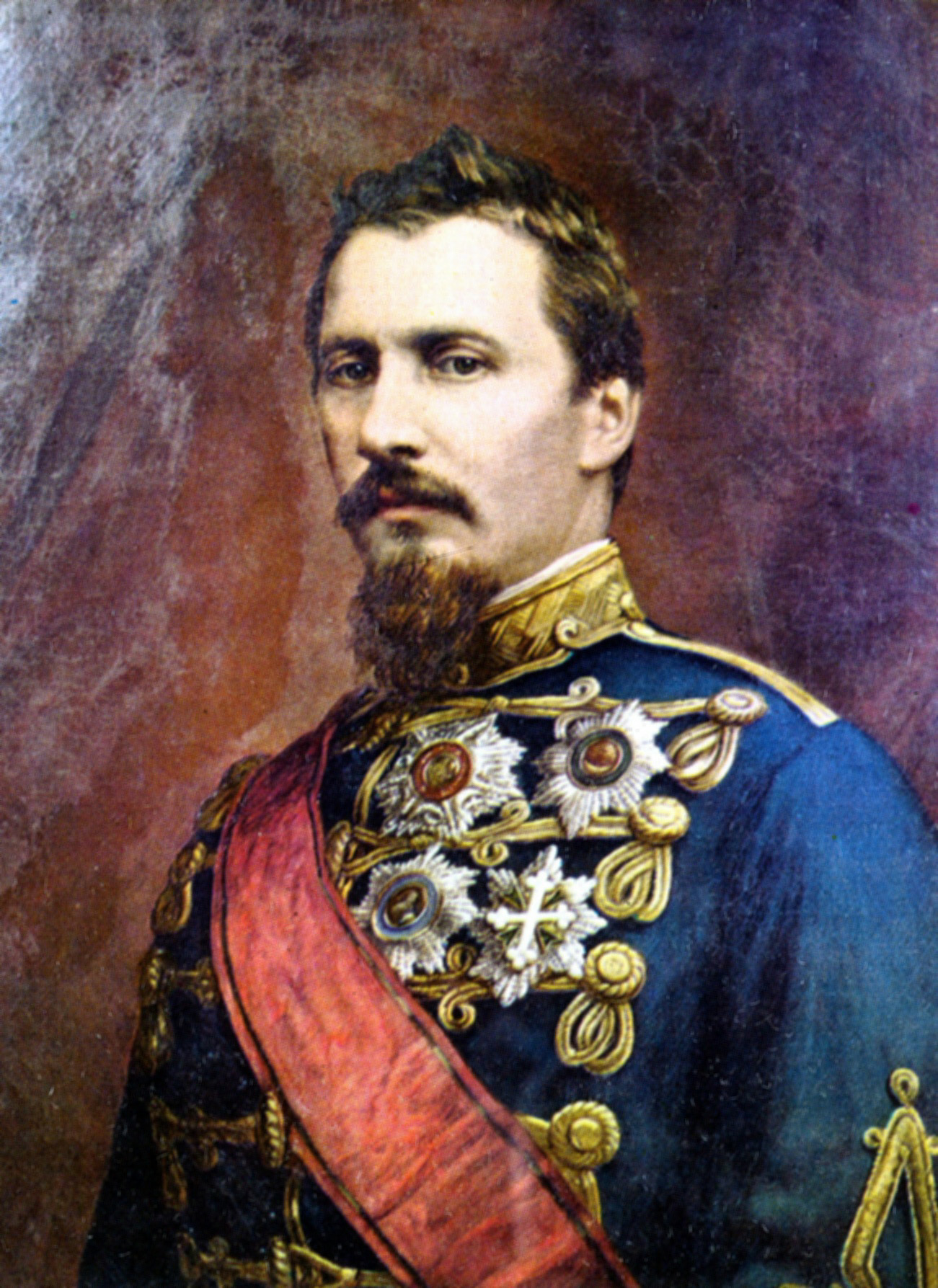
Portrait of Prince Alexandru Ioan Cuza

Iași has a long tradition in higher education, the first institute that functioned on the territory of Romania was Academia Vasiliană founded in 1640 by the Moldavian Prince Vasile Lupu, followed, in 1707, by Princely Academy of Iași. The Princely Academy (renamed, in 1812, The Academy of Filology and Science) matched up to the standards of the other European Academies of the time and the Romanian language gained importance over the Greek language.

The foundation, in 1835, of the Academia Mihăileană is considered a landmark in the history of Romanian higher education. The Academia Mihăileană was created under the auspices of Prince Mihail Sturdza (hence its name), striving for progress and for "meeting the standards of the enlightened Europe". Three faculties were set up: the Faculty of Law, the Faculty of Philosophy and the Faculty of Theology and the curriculum resembled to a great extent that of Austrian and German academies.

After the Unification of the Romanian Principalities of Moldavia and Wallachia by the Prince Alexandru Ioan Cuza, the inauguration, at 26 October 1860, of the University of Iași, the first Romanian modern university, was to be a stepping stone to modern higher education in Romania.

By 1879, the University of Iași had four faculties: Law, Letters and Philosophy, Sciences, and Medicine. In 1892, the Faculty of Sciences added the Department of Organic and Inorganic Chemistry, followed by the Department of Agricultural Chemistry, in 1906, and the School of the Industrial Electricity, in 1910.

In March 1937, the technical higher education departments and the Faculty of Agricultural Sciences were transferred to the newly established Gheorghe Asachi Polytechnic School, and in 1948, the Medical School became the independent Institute of Medicine and Pharmacy of Iași.

=== Coat of arms ===
Its coat of arms with the Y-shaped heraldic pall symbolizes the three initiatives which led to the foundation of the university: the Academia Vasiliană, the Academia Mihăileană, the University of Iași. The central element is the Bible, the classic emblem of higher education. The three shiny stars stand for the three faculties of the university at its foundation moment, Philosophy, Law and Theology, on blue and argent background, the same colors used on the Cuza family shield.

== Grounds ==
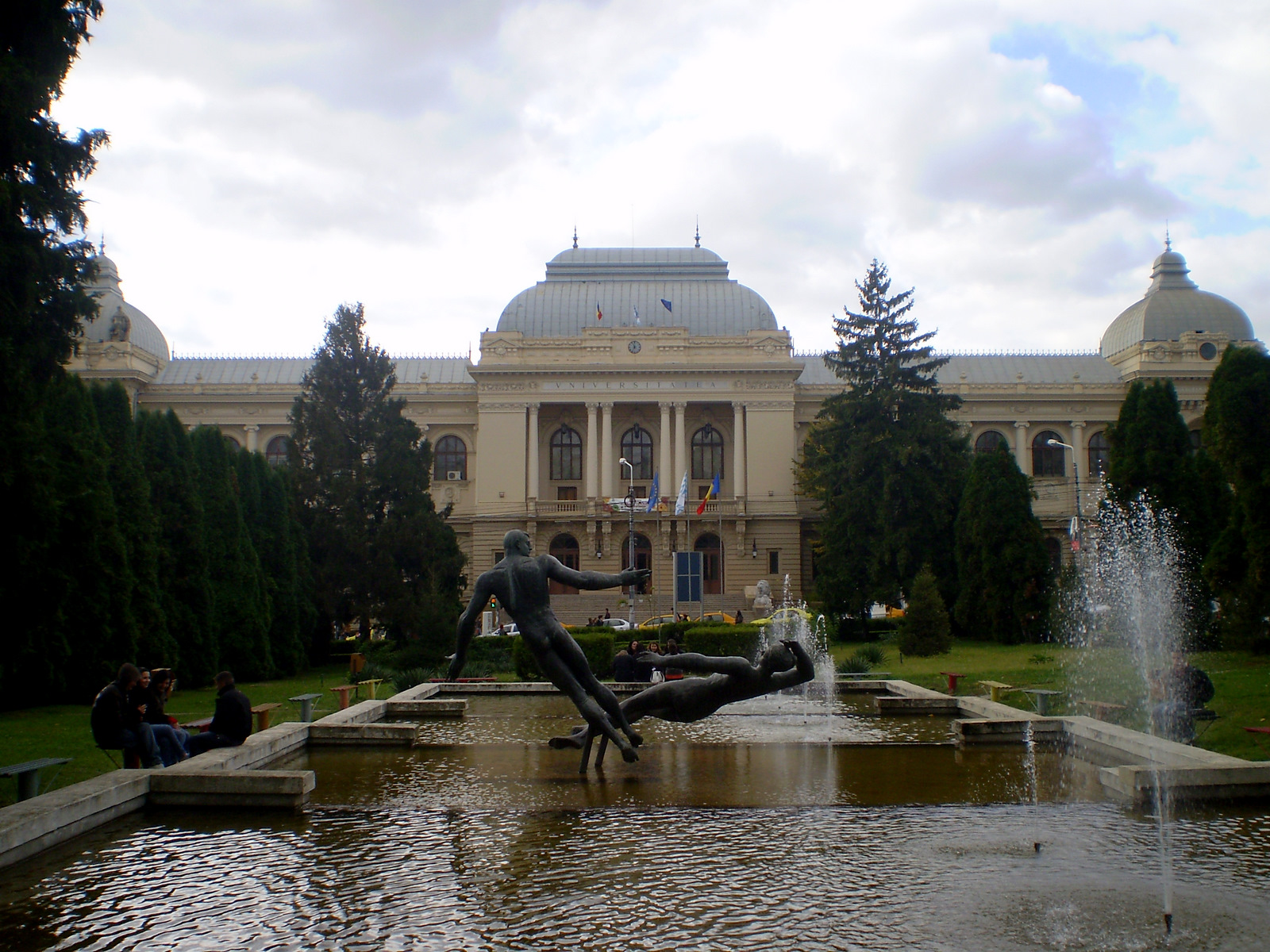
The University Square

The university grounds lie on Copou Hill in the northern part of the city.

The main university building, known as the University Palace, was erected between 1893 and 1897, and extended in 1933–1937, on the site of the first Iași National Theatre which had burned down in 1888. The Hall of the university, known as The Hall of the Lost Footsteps, served as a parliamentary debating chamber between 1917 and 1918 when, during the Great War, Iași was the capital of Romania. In 1968–1978, the painter Sabin Bălașa created a series of strongly romanticized frescoes for the arcades. The University Palace is shared with the Gheorghe Asachi Technical University.

== Academics ==
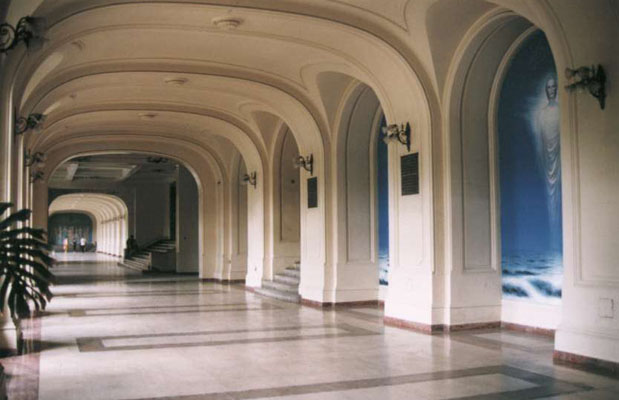
The Hall of the Lost Footsteps

Nowadays, Alexandru Ioan Cuza University is made up of 15 faculties and one department:

- The Faculty of Biology, founded in 1864 as a department of the Faculty of Sciences, became part of the Faculty of Natural Sciences in 1948, and organized as faculty in 1990.
- The Faculty of Chemistry was founded in 1864 as a department of the Faculty of Sciences, and organized as faculty in 1948. It offers programs in chemistry, technological biochemistry, and medical chemistry.
- The Faculty of Computer Science was founded in 1965, as the Department of Computing Machines of the Faculty of Mathematics. In 1991, it became the first faculty in Computer Science of a non-technical university in Romania.
- The Faculty of Economics and Business Administration, founded in 1962 (as the Faculty of Economics).
- The Faculty of Geography and Geology, founded in 1865 as the Department of Geology-Mineralogy of the Faculty of Sciences. In 1948, it became part of the Faculty of Natural Sciences, and organized as the Faculty of Biology-Geography-Geology, in 1977.
- The Faculty of History, founded in 1860 as a department of the Faculty of Philosophy. It was part of the Faculties of History-Geography, Letters, or History-Philosophy until 1990, when it was organized as an individual faculty.
- The Faculty of Law, founded in 1856, it is one of the founder faculties.
- The Faculty of Letters, founded in 1860, as part of the Faculty of Philosophy, renamed in 1864 as Faculty of Philosophy and Letters. It became an individual faculty in 1960.
- The Faculty of Mathematics, was founded in 1864 as a department of the Faculty of Sciences, and organized as faculty in 1948.
- The Faculty of Philosophy and Social-Political Sciences, founded in 1856 as the Faculty of Philosophy, became one of the founder faculties.
- The Faculty of Physical Education and Sports, founded in 1960.
- The Faculty of Physics, was founded in 1864 as a department of the Faculty of Sciences, and organized as faculty in 1962. It offers programs in physics, medical physics, biophysics, computational physics and engineering physics.
- The Faculty of Psychology and Education Sciences, founded as the Departments of Pedagogy and Psychology starting 1878, it became a faculty in 1997.
- The Faculty of Orthodox Theology, founded in 1860, as one of the founder faculties.
- The Faculty of Catholic Theology, founded in 2002.
- Centre for European Studies, founded in 2000.

=== Library ===
Founded in 1835 as Library of the Academia Mihăileană, Mihai Eminescu Central University Library holds about 2.5 million volumes that form the main collection and an old and rare collection, from the 15th to the 19th centuries, of over 100,000 Romanian and foreign documents, manuscripts, books, albums, maps, stamps, archive items.

The building that houses the main collection is located at the base of Copou Hill, and it was built between 1930 and 1934 to serve as the headquarters of King Ferdinand's Cultural Foundation. The triangular building with Doric columns and cupola is decorated with Carrara marble and Venetian mosaics. By 1945, the Foundation library had become one of the biggest in the country. Today, the library is the largest in Moldavia, with a great number of manuscripts and old books.

== Research ==
Alexandru Ioan Cuza University is involved in over 400 national and international research projects, with the logistic support of 24 research centres.

== International relations ==
The university is a member of different university networks and associations, such as the Coimbra Group, the European University Association, the Utrecht Network, the International Association of Universities, or the Agence universitaire de la Francophonie.

== Gallery ==
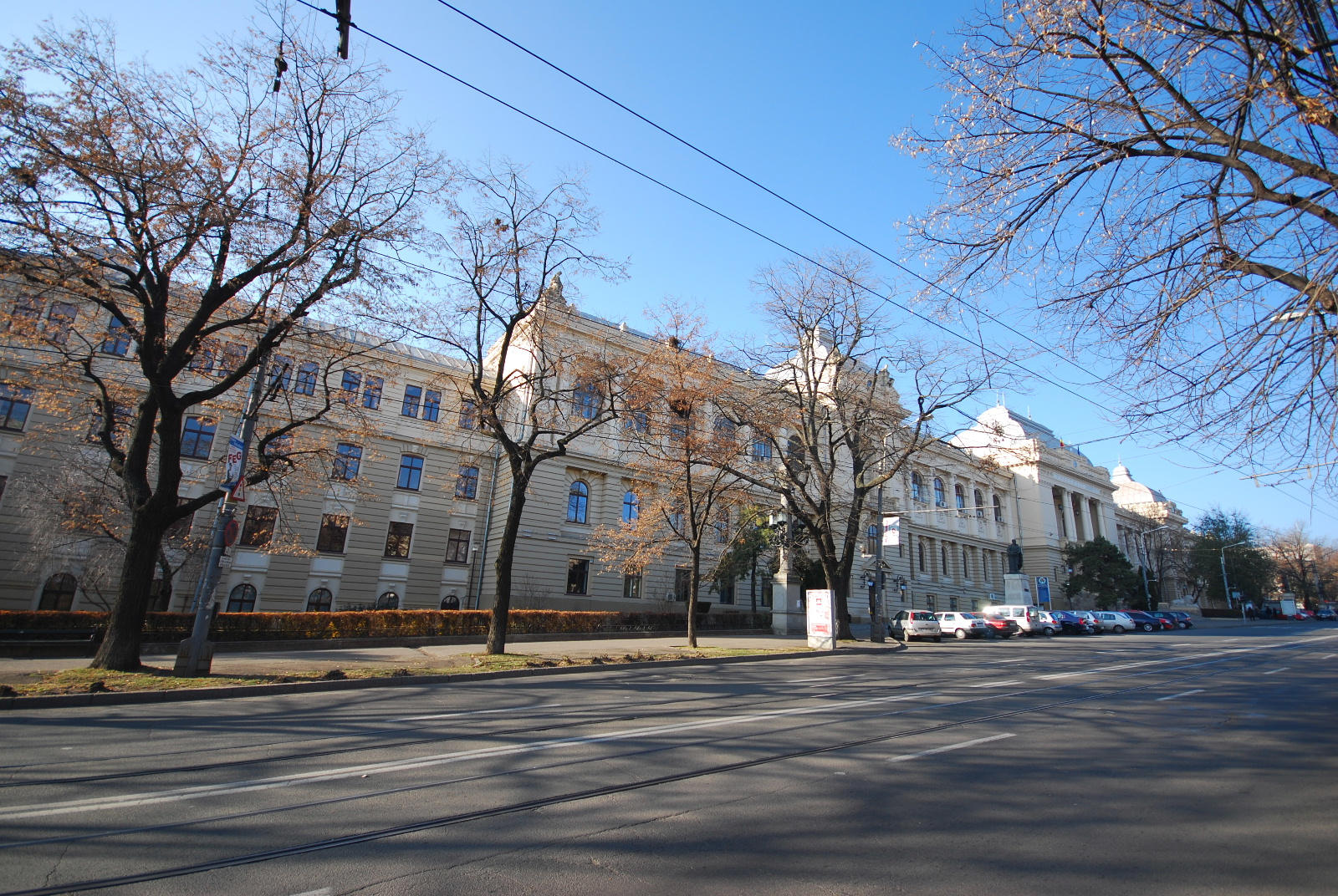
The Main Building (Corp A) of the Al.I.Cuza University

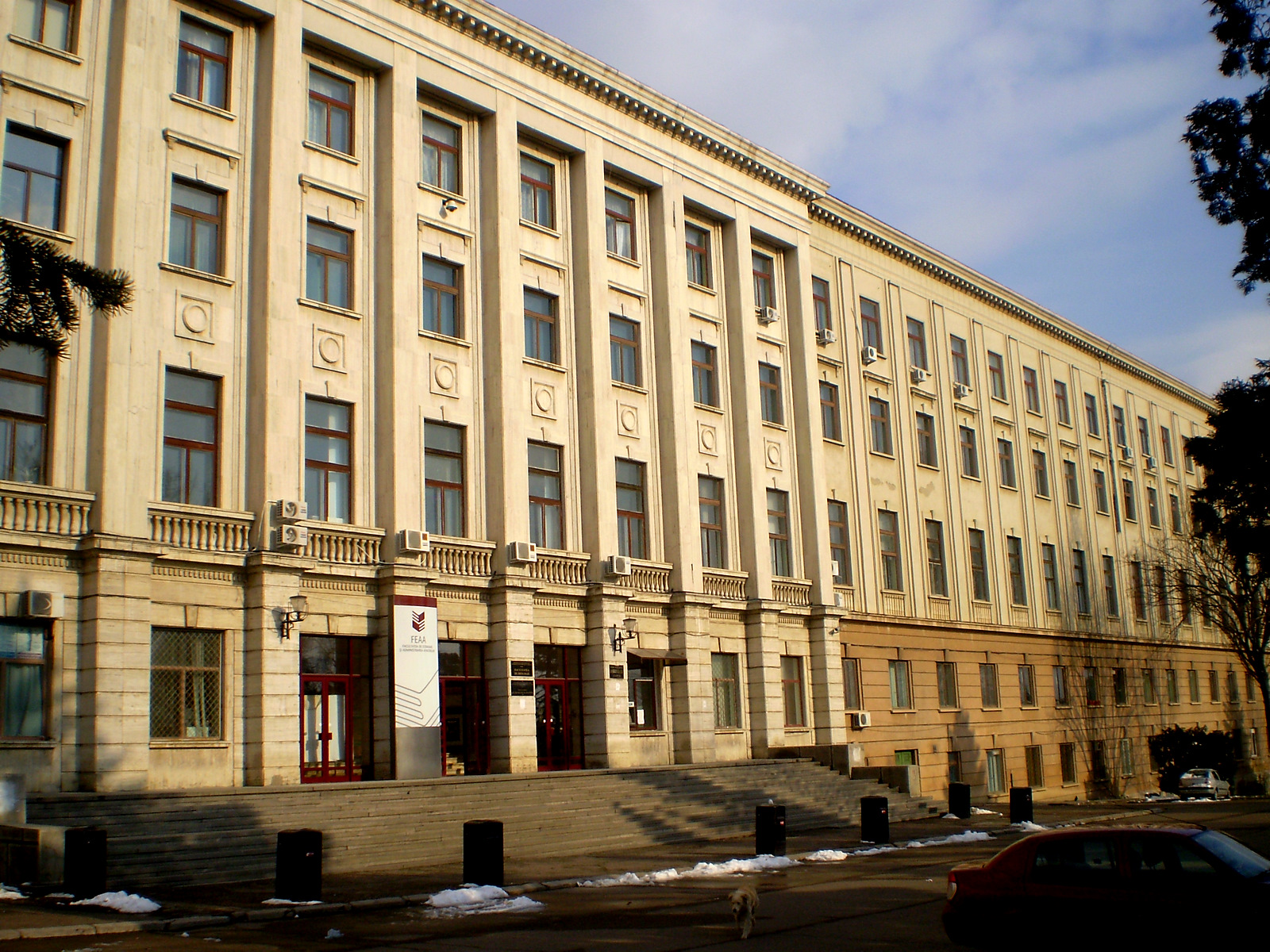
Building B, front view

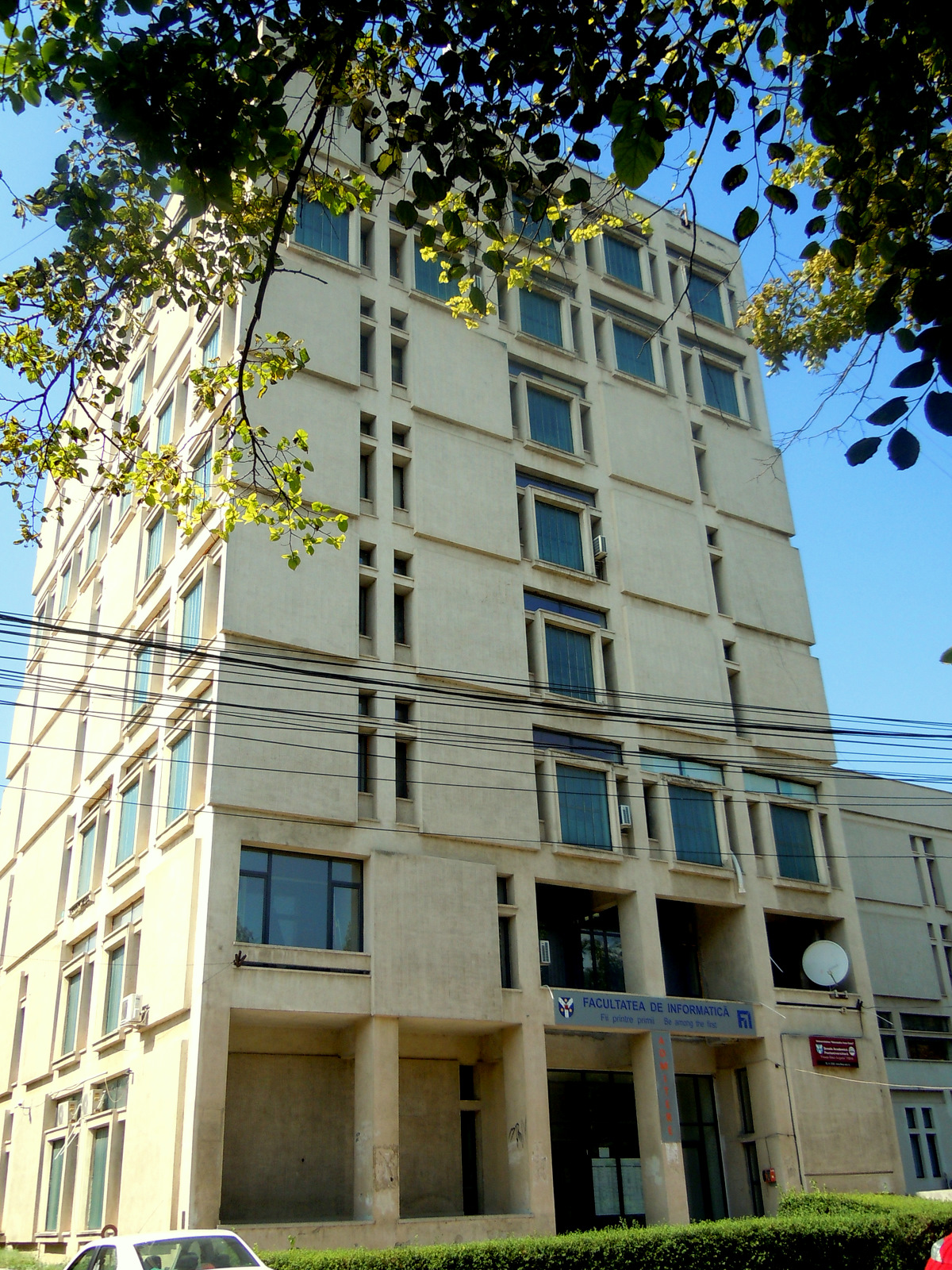
Building C, Faculty of Computer Science

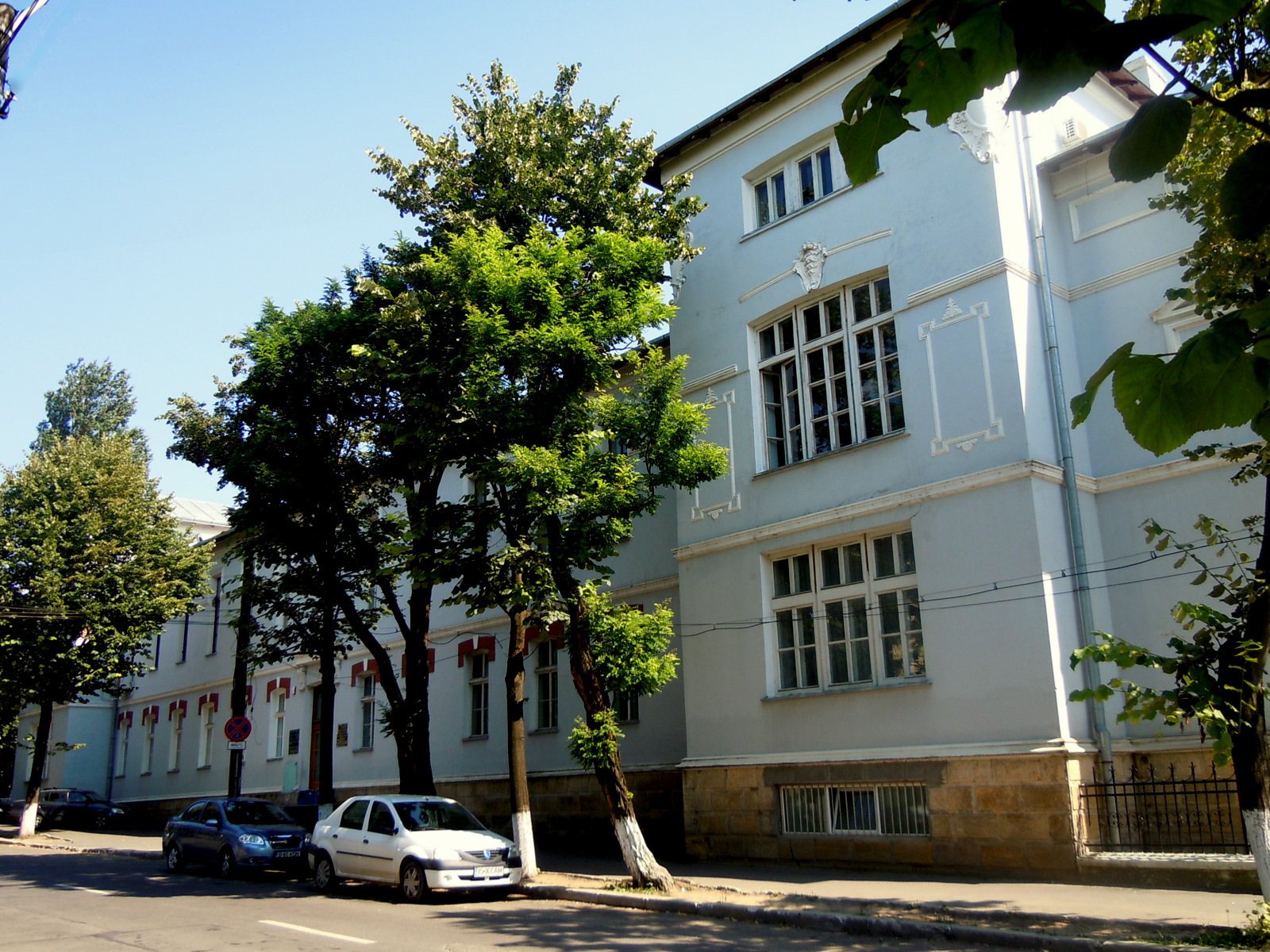
Al.I.Cuza University, building D

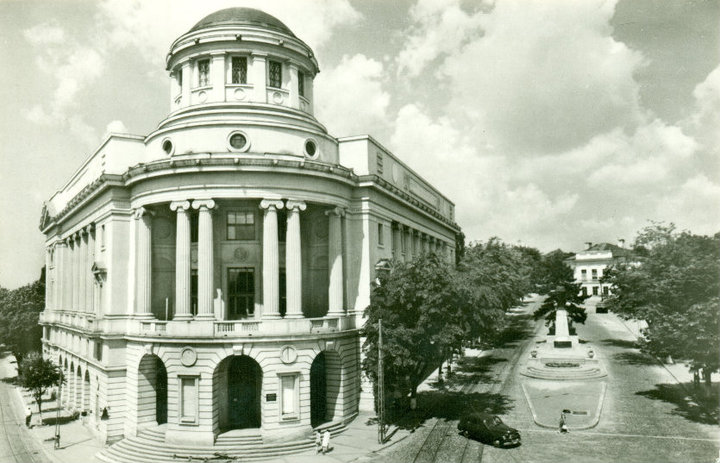
The Mihai Eminescu Central University Library

== Faculty, alumni and rectors ==
Past and present faculty
- Petre Andrei
- Vasile Arvinte
- Ion Atanasiu
- Sava Athanasiu
- Alexandru Bădărău
- Nicolae Bagdasar
- Aurel Baranga
- Viorel P. Barbu
- Ilie Bărbulescu
- Simion Bărnuțiu
- George Bogdan
- Ioan Borcea
- Octav Botez
- Dimitrie Brândză
- Gheorghe I. Brătianu
- Traian Bratu
- Paul Bujor
- Gheorghe Buzatu
- Ioan Cantacuzino
- Matei B. Cantacuzino
- Anton Carpinschi
- Alexandru Cecal
- Șerban Cioculescu
- Mihai Ciucă
- Alexandru Claudian
- Constantin Climescu
- Grigore Cobălcescu
- Petre Constantinescu-Iași
- Vasile Conta
- Constantin Corduneanu
- Neculai Costăchescu
- Nicolae Culianu
- A. C. Cuza
- Nicolae Dașcovici
- Aron Densușianu
- Constantin Dimitrescu-Iași
- Constantin Dissescu
- Charles Drouhet
- Ștefan Emilian
- Constantin Eraclide
- Anastasie Fătu
- Bonifaciu Florescu
- Tahsin Gemil
- Dimitrie Gusti
- Nicolae Hortolomei
- Ioan Hudiță
- Horia Hulubei
- Dragomir Hurmuzescu
- Garabet Ibrăileanu
- Ion Ionescu de la Brad
- Iorgu Iordan
- Nicolae Iorga
- Patriarch Iustin of Romania
- Gheorghe Ivănescu
- George Ivașcu
- Alexandru Lambrior
- Nicolae Leon
- Dan Lungu
- Titu Maiorescu
- Gheorghe Mârzescu
- Octav Mayer
- Ioan Mire Melik
- Istrate Micescu
- Ștefan Micle
- I. I. Mironescu
- Petru Th. Missir
- Grigore Moisil
- Gheorghe Moroșanu
- George Murnu
- Alexander Myller
- Vera Myller
- Anton Naum
- Iacob Negruzzi
- Leon M. Negruzzi
- Petre P. Negulescu
- Fritz Netolitzky
- Ștefan S. Nicolau
- Dumitru Oprea
- Andrei Oțetea
- Cezar Papacostea
- Constantin Ion Parhon
- Ion Petrovici
- Alexandru Philippide
- Luca Pițu
- Alexandru Virgil Platon
- George Poede
- Dimitrie Pompeiu
- Petru Poni
- Grigore T. Popa
- Ilie Popa
- Tiberiu Popoviciu
- Ștefan Procopiu
- Nicolae Quintescu
- Francisc Rainer
- Mihai Ralea
- I. M. Rașcu
- Decebal Traian Remeș
- Raluca Ripan
- Alexander Rubel
- Ioan Gheorghe Savin
- Filaret Scriban
- Leon Sculy Logothetides
- Ștefan C. Șendrea
- Ion Th. Simionescu
- Dan Simonescu
- Alexandru Slătineanu
- Gheorghe Spacu
- Victor Spinei
- Constantin Stere
- Simion Stoilow
- Ion Strat
- Corneliu Șumuleanu
- Ion Tănăsescu
- Șerban Țițeica
- Mihai Răzvan Ungureanu
- V. A. Urechia
- Victor Vâlcovici
- George Vâlsan
- Ștefan Vârgolici
- Mihail Vlădescu
- Alexandru Dimitrie Xenopol
- Gheorghe Zane
- Paul Zarifopol
- Ștefan Zeletin
- Alexandru Zub
Alumni
- Petre Andrei
- Sorin Antohi
- Vladimir Andrunakievich
- Conon Arămescu-Donici
- Teoctist Arăpașu
- Sava Athanasiu
- Maria Baciu
- Taulant Balla
- Viorel P. Barbu
- Alexandru Bârlădeanu
- Monica Bîrlădeanu
- Ioan Bogdan
- Petru Bogdan
- Vasile Bogrea
- Ioan Borcea
- Demostene Botez
- Octav Botez
- Eugen Boureanul
- Gheorghe I. Brătianu
- Grigore Brișcu
- Mihail Gheorghiu Bujor
- Theodor Burghele
- Gheorghe Buzatu
- Ion Buzdugan
- Eugenio Coșeriu
- Gabriela Crețu
- Vlad Filat
- Benjamin Fondane
- Ilie Gârneață
- Tahsin Gemil
- Gheorghe Ghibănescu
- Andrei Glavina
- Dimitrie Gusti
- Pan Halippa
- Loretta Handrabura
- Calistrat Hogaș
- Nicolae Hortolomei
- Ioan Hudiță
- Horia Hulubei
- Victor Iamandi
- Garabet Ibrăileanu
- Eleny Ionel
- Raicu Ionescu-Rion
- Theodor V. Ionescu
- Iorgu Iordan
- Nicolae Iorga
- Petre Iorgulescu-Yor
- Magda Isanos
- George Ivașcu
- Alina l'Ami
- Traian Lalescu
- Alexandru Lambrior
- Gheorghe N. Leon
- Nicolae Leon
- Florian Luca
- Dan Lungu
- Gheorghe Macovei
- Tudor Măinescu
- Nicolae Malaxa
- Lucia Mantu
- Octav Mayer
- I. I. Mironescu
- Emilia Morosan
- Gheorghe Moroșanu
- Ilie Moscovici
- Ion Moța
- Cristian Mungiu
- Alina Mungiu-Pippidi
- Andrei Muraru
- Sergiu Musteață
- Andrei Năstase
- Ion Negrei
- Ion Negrescu
- Constantin Niță
- Sergiu Niță
- Alexis Nour
- Marian Oprișan
- Gherman Pântea
- George Panu
- Dimitrie D. Pătrășcanu
- Cezar Petrescu
- Alexandru A. Philippide
- Alexandru Philippide
- Alexandru Piru
- George Poede
- Grigore T. Popa
- Ilie Popa
- Spiridon Popescu
- Ștefan Procopiu
- George Pruteanu
- Mihai Ralea
- I. M. Rașcu
- Decebal Traian Remeș
- Raluca Ripan
- Profira Sadoveanu
- Constantin Schifirneț
- Isaac Jacob Schoenberg
- Robert Schuster
- Mihail Sevastos
- Ion Th. Simionescu
- Constantin Simirad
- Nichita Smochină
- Marin Sorescu
- Eugenia D. Soru
- Gheorghe Spacu
- Theodor Speranția
- Victor Spinei
- Artur Stavri
- Viorel Ștefan
- Constantin Stere
- Avram Steuerman-Rodion
- D. I. Suchianu
- Corneliu Șumuleanu
- Maria Tacu
- Christian Tămaș
- Alexandru Tănase
- Ion Tănăsescu
- Ionel Teodoreanu
- Păstorel Teodoreanu
- Octavian Țîcu
- Tudorel Toader
- Marcela Topor
- Alexandru Tzaicu
- Mihai Răzvan Ungureanu
- Sabetai Unguru
- Neculai Alexandru Ursu
- Ghenadie Valuța
- Ștefan Vârgolici
- Vasile Vasilache
- Constantin Dan Vasiliu
- Ion Vinea
- Gheorghe Vrănceanu
- Gheorghe Zane
- Paul Zarifopol
- Alexandru Zub
Rectors
- Ion Strat (1860–1861)
- Filaret Scriban (1861–1862)
- Nicolae Ionescu (1862–1863)
- Titu Maiorescu (1863–1867)
- Ștefan Micle (1867–1875)
- Petru Suciu (1875–1880)
- Nicolae Culianu (1880–1898)
- Alexandru D. Xenopol (1898–1901)
- Constantin Climescu (1901–1907)
- George Bogdan (1907–1913)
- Constantin Stere (1913–1916)
- Matei B. Cantacuzino (1916–1918)
- Nicolae Leon (1918)
- Iulian Teodorescu (1919–1920)
- Nicolae Leon (1920–1921)
- Traian Bratu (1921–1922)
- Ion Th. Simionescu (1922–1923)
- Alexandru Slătineanu (1923–1926)
- Petru Bogdan (1926–1932)
- Traian Bratu (1932–1938)
- Ion Tănăsescu (1938–1940)
- Virgil Nițulescu (1940–1941)
- Mihail D. David (1941–1944)
- Alexandru Myller (1944–1945)
- Leon Ballif (1947–1948)
- Jean Livescu (1948–1955)
- Ion L. Creangă (1955–1972)
- Mihai Todosia (1972–1981)
- Viorel Barbu (1981–1989)
- Petre Mîlcomete (1989)
- Petru Călin Ignat (1989–1992)
- Gheorghe Popa (1992–2000)
- Dumitru Oprea (2000–2008)
- Vasile Ișan (2008–2016)
- Tudorel Toader (2016–2024)
- Liviu-George Maha (2024–)

== See also ==
- Academia Mihăileană
- List of modern universities in Europe (1801–1945)
- Utrecht Network
