= Mihail Vlădescu =

Romanian botanist and politician (1865–1944)

Mihail C. Vlădescu (25 April 1865 – 1944) was a Romanian botanist and politician.

Born in Câmpulung, his parents Constantin and Bălașa were intellectuals. After being educated by private tutors, he went to Paris for his high school degree before enrolling in the natural sciences faculty at the University of Paris in 1885. After a period of specialization at the University of Würzburg, he obtained a doctorate of science from the Sorbonne in 1889. His thesis dealt with stem development in Selaginella species and was supervised by Gaston Bonnier. He married Maria Anastasescu in 1897. In 1888, he was named professor of botany at Iași University, where he took over a course temporarily taught by Nicolae Leon. In 1890, he held a lecture at the university in which he advocated for evolutionist ideas and defended Darwinism. His students included Sava Athanasiu, Ioan Gh. Botez, Dimitrie Călugăreanu, Constantin Motaș and Ion Th. Simionescu. In 1895, following the death of Dimitrie Brândză, he was transferred to the University of Bucharest, also as botany professor.

In Bucharest, Vlădescu taught plant morphology and classification until he reached the retirement age in 1936. He headed the Botanical Institute from 1895 to 1936, was vice president of the Romanian Scientific Society from 1901 to 1936 and president of the Cultural League from 1897 to 1903. He was dean of the science faculty from 1915 to 1919 and rector of the university from 1920 to 1923. In politics, he sat in both the Assembly of Deputies and the Senate. While in Iași, he belonged to George Panu's Radical Party, shifting to the Conservative Party once he reached Bucharest. He then joined the Conservative-Democratic Party and, finally, the People's Party. From December 1904 to October 1906, he was Religious Affairs and Public Instruction Minister under Gheorghe Grigore Cantacuzino; from December 1921 to January 1922, he served as Domains Minister under Take Ionescu. While a Conservative deputy for his native Muscel area from 1901 to 1909, he initiated legislation for a rural credit bank called Casa Rurală.

His articles appeared in various publications, and he submitted several botanical entries to Enciclopedia română in which he espoused Darwinist ideas. The standard author abbreviation Vlădescu is used to indicate this person as the author when citing a botanical name.
