= Emilia Săulea =

Romanian geologist and paleontologist (1904–1998)

- Born: 21 July 1904; Iasi, Romania
- Died: April 1, 1998 (aged 93); Bucharest, Romania
- Education: University of Bucharest
- Occupations: Geologist, professor
- Known for: First female paleontologist from Romania

Emilia Săulea (July 21, 1904 – April 1, 1998) was a Romanian geologist and paleontologist. She became known as the first female paleontologist from Romania. She was named an honorary member of the Romanian Academy in 1993.

== Life and work ==
Săulea was born 21 July 1904, in Iasi, Romania.

She attended the Oltea Doamna High School in Iasi, graduating in 1925, and went on to attend the Faculty of Natural Sciences of the University of Iasi, (now known as Alexandru Ioan Cuza University) graduating in 1929, where she worked with professors Ion Simionescu and Ion Athanasiu. She specialized in mineralogy and petrography of sedimentary rocks (Basel, 1932; Paris, 1934 ) and earned her doctorate in geology at the University of Bucharest (1946), with the thesis Les récifs et les faciés détritiques du Sarmatien moyen de la partie centrale de Plateau moldave.

After graduation, Săulea taught in the Geology Department of the University of Iasi (1930 - 1940), then in Bucharest (1945 – 1965), where she taught stratigraphy and historical geography. From 1950 she also worked in research at the Geological Committee/Institute, in the field of paleontology and stratigraphy of tertiary formations in Romania, of microscopic fossil fauna from the Romanian Neogene period

She collaborated in the creation of the first Romanian study on fossil foraminifera from the Miocene: Contributions à la Connaissance de la faune de l'étage Méotien (1948) and the first lithofacial atlas of the Romanian Neogene: Lithofacial maps of the Upper Neogene in Romania (1965).

Săulea died 1 April 1998 in Bucharest, Romania.

== Honors and distinctions ==
Emilia Săulea, the first female paleontologist from Romania, honorary member of the Romanian Geological Society, also became an honorary member of the Romanian Academy (12 November 1993), receiving the Grigore Cobălcescu Award from the Academy.

== Selected publications ==
- Cutremurele de pămînt din Romînia, Ion Atanasiu, Emilia Saulea, Editura Academiei Republicii Populare Romîne, 1961
- Geologie istorică, Emilia Saulea, Ed. Didact., 1967
