= Ion Tănăsescu =

Ion Tănăsescu may refer to:

- Ion Tănăsescu (chemist) (1892–1959), Romanian chemist
- Ion Tănăsescu (surgeon) (1875–1954), Romanian surgeon and anatomist
