= Vera Myller =

Romanian mathematician (1880–1970)

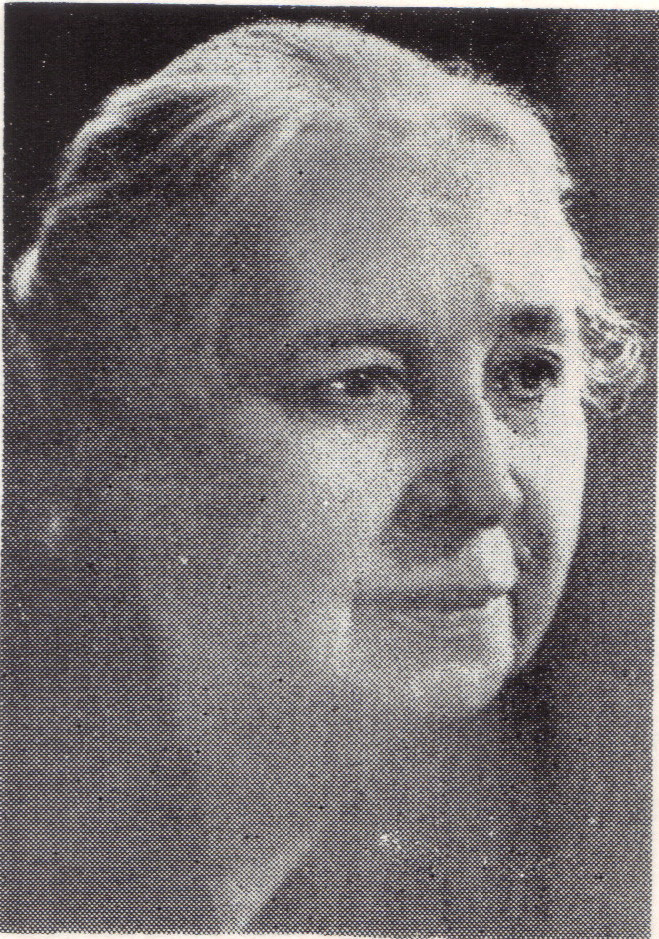
Vera Myller

Vera Myller-Lebedev (Note: Russian: Вера Евгеньевна Миллер-Лебедева, romanized: Vera Yevgenyevna Miller-Lebedeva.) (1 December 1880 – 12 December 1970) was a Russian-born mathematician who earned her doctorate in Germany with David Hilbert and became the first female university professor in Romania.

== Education ==
Vera Lebedev was born in Saint Petersburg and educated in Novgorod. From 1897 through 1902 she participated in the Bestuzhev Courses in Saint Petersburg. She then traveled to the University of Göttingen, where she completed a doctorate in 1906 under the supervision of David Hilbert. Her dissertation was Die Theorie der Integralgleichungen in Anwendungen auf einige Reihenentwickelungen, and concerned integral equations.

== Marriage and career ==
In Göttingen, she met Romanian mathematician Alexander Myller. She married him in 1907, moved with him to Romania, enrolled in the University of Iași, and in 1910 joined the mathematics faculty there. In 1918 she was promoted to full professor, becoming Romania's first female professor.

She died in Iași in 1970, and is buried at the city's Eternitatea Cemetery.

== Contributions ==
She wrote Romanian-language textbooks on algebra (1942) and algebraic applications of group theory (1945), and won the Romanian State Prize in 1953 for her algebra text.
