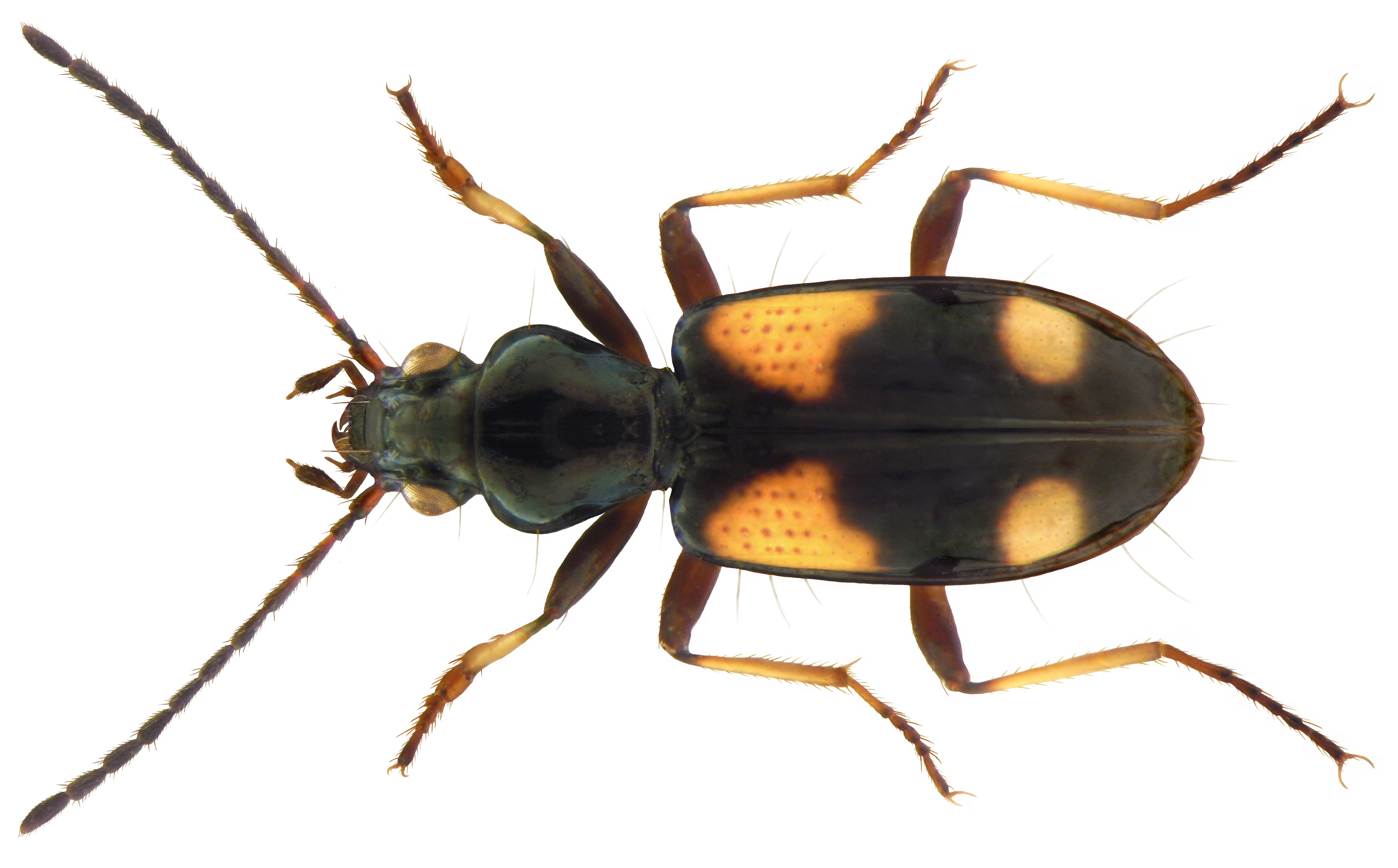

Scientific classification
- Kingdom: Animalia
- Phylum: Arthropoda
- Class: Insecta
- Order: Coleoptera
- Suborder: Adephaga
- Family: Carabidae
- Subfamily: Trechinae
- Tribe: Bembidiini
- Subtribe: Bembidiina
- Genus: Bembidion
- Species: B. genei

Binomial name
- Bembidion genei Küster, 1847

Synonyms
- Bembidion illigeri Netolitzky, 1914

= Bembidion genei =

Species of beetle

Bembidion genei is a species of ground beetle in the family Carabidae, found mainly in the Palearctic.

== Subspecies ==
These four subspecies belong to the species Bembidion genei:

- Bembidion genei genei Küster, 1847
- Bembidion genei hispaniae (Bonavita & Vigna Taglianti, 2010)
- Bembidion genei illigeri Netolitzky, 1914
- Bembidion genei trinacriae (Bonavita & Vigna Taglianti, 2010)
