= Ilie Popa (mathematician) =

Romanian mathematician

- Born: July 20, 1907; Iași, Kingdom of Romania
- Died: July 26, 1983 (aged 76); Iași, Socialist Republic of Romania
- Citizenship: Romanian
- Education: University of Iași
- Scientific career
- Fields: mathematics
- Workplaces: University of Iași; Gheorghe Asachi Technical University of Iași
- Thesis: Contributions to Centro-Affine Differential Geometry (1934)
- Doctoral advisor: Alexander Myller
- Other academic advisors: Octav Mayer; Gheorghe Gheorghiev; Mendel Haimovici
- Doctoral students: Constantin Corduneanu

Ilie Popa (July 20, 1907 – July 26, 1983) was a Romanian mathematician and Head of the Mathematical Analysis Department at the University of Iași. He is known for his contributions to differential geometry, mathematical analysis, and the history of mathematics.

== Biography ==
Born in Iași, he attended the Costache Negruzzi High School in his native city. In 1927, he enrolled at the University of Iași, graduating in 1931. Upon graduation, he became an assistant professor at the Faculty of Science of the University of Iași and began his research activity under the guidance of his advisor, Alexander Myller. In 1932, Popa published his first papers (in differential geometry), in collaboration with Mendel Haimovici. He obtained his Ph.D. in 1934 with thesis Contributions to Centro-Affine Differential Geometry, in which he pursued research themes of his two mentors, Myller and Octav Mayer. In 1936, the Romanian Academy awarded him a two-year scholarship to pursue his postdoctoral studies in Italy and Germany; during this period, he visited Enrico Bompiani at Sapienza University of Rome and Wilhelm Blaschke at the University of Hamburg. While away, he was promoted to associate professor in the Department of Higher Algebra at the University of Iași. After a brief stint in 1942 at the Gheorghe Asachi Technical University of Iași, he returned to the University of Iași as Professor. In 1948 he became the Head of the Mathematical Analysis Department, a position that he held until his retirement in 1973. From 1944 to 1945, and again from 1965 to 1971, he was pro-rector of the university.
