= Culianu =

Culianu is a Romanian surname. Notable people with the surname include:

- Ioan P. Culianu (1950–1991), Romanian historian, philosopher, and essayist
- Nicolae Culianu (1832–1915), Romanian mathematician and astronomer, great-grandfather of Ioan
