= Deleni, Vaslui =

Deleni
- Commune
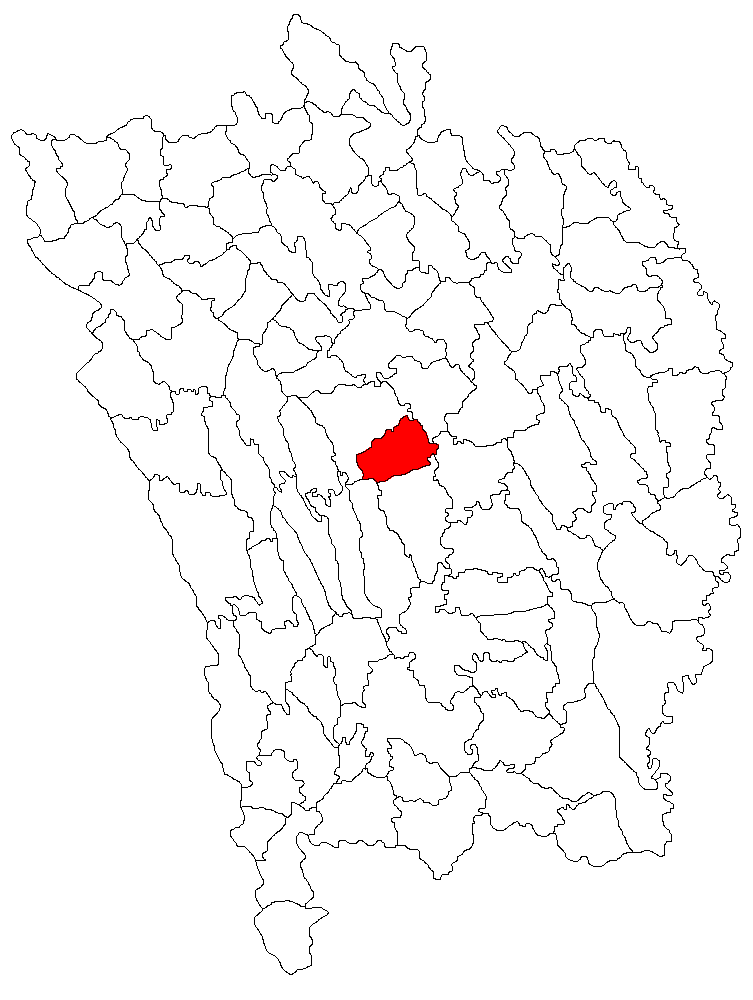
- Location in Vaslui County

- Location in Romania
- Coordinates: 46°33′N 27°45′E
- Country: Romania
- County: Vaslui
- Population (2021-12-01): 1,837
- Time zone: EET/EEST (UTC+2/+3)
- Vehicle reg.: VS

Deleni is a commune in Vaslui County, Western Moldavia, Romania. It is composed of four villages: Bulboaca, Deleni, Moreni and Zizinca.

Notable residents include Viorel P. Barbu (b. 1941), mathematician and member of the Romanian Academy.
