= Eugeniu Botez =

Romanian writer, best (1874 - 1933)

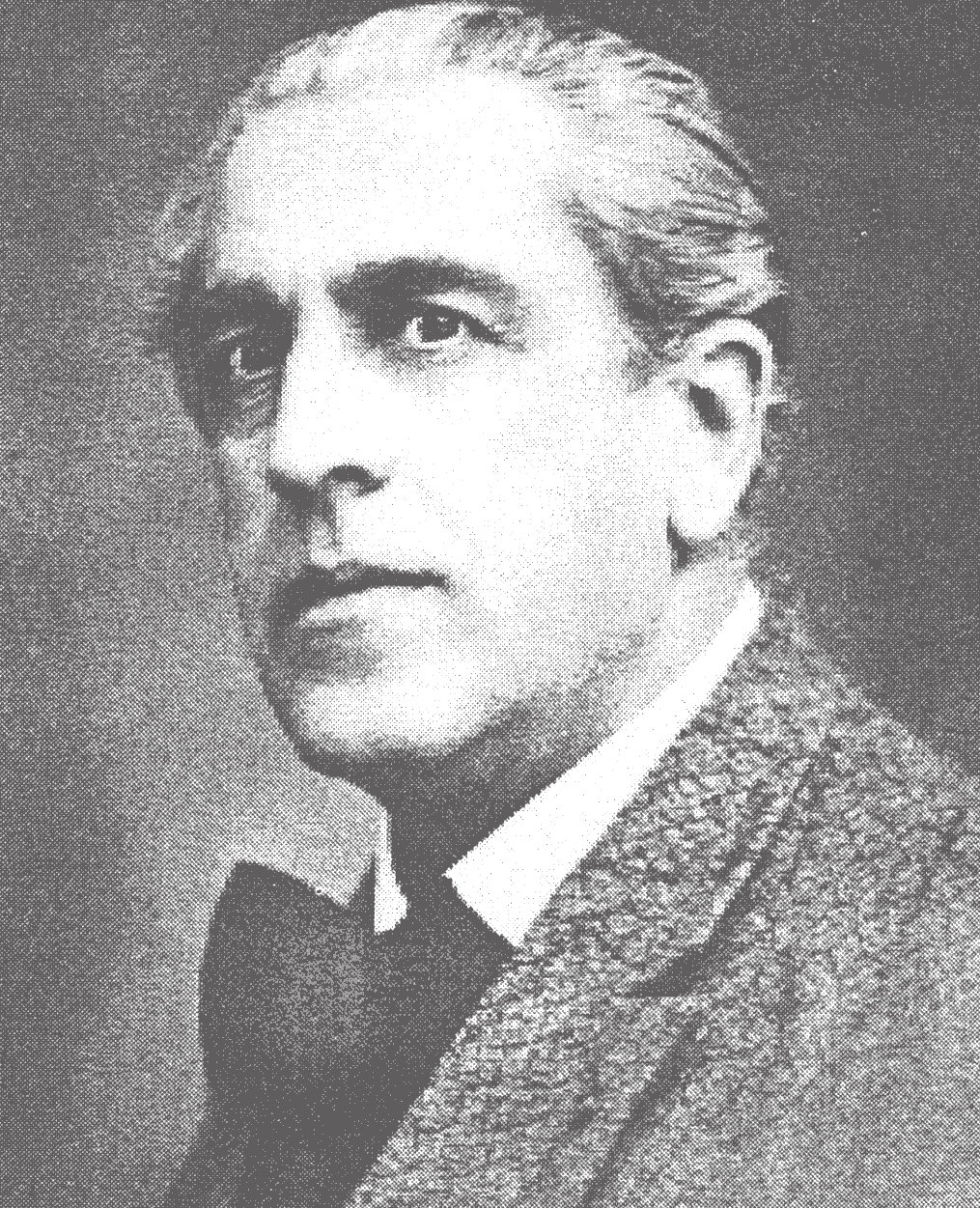
Eugeniu Botez

Eugeniu Botez (Romanian pronunciation: [e.uˈdʒenju boˈtez]; 28 November 1874 – 12 May 1933), who also wrote under the pseudonym Jean Bart, was a Romanian writer, best known for his novel Europolis (1933).

He was born in Burdujeni, at the time a village in Botoșani County, now a neighborhood of the city of Suceava. His father, Panait Botez, was a general in the Romanian Army; his mother was Smaranda (née Nastasachi) and his brother was Octav Botez. At age 4 he moved with his family to Iași; in elementary school he had Ion Creangă as a teacher. After attending the military high school in Iași from 1889 to 1894, he went to Bucharest, where he graduated from the Officers School in 1896 with the rank of second lieutenant.

Botez had three children: Călin-Adam (born in 1909), Stroe-Eugen (1912) and Ada (1918). The boys were from his first marriage with Marioara Dumitrescu (who died in 1913), and Ada from his second marriage with Mania Goldman (which ended in divorce in 1926). Mania retained her husband's name, becoming known as the pianist Manya Botez.

He was elected a corresponding member of the Romanian Academy in 1922. He died in Bucharest in 1933.

== Works ==
- Jurnal de bord, 1901
- Datorii uitate, 1916
- În cușca leului, 1916
- Prințesa Bibița, 1923
- În Deltă..., 1925
- Peste Ocean - Note dintr-o călătorie în America de Nord, 1926
- Schițe marine din lumea porturilor, 1928
- Însemnări și amintiri, 1928
- O corabie românească. Nava-școală bricul "Mircea", 1931
- Pe drumuri de apă, 1931
- Europolis, 1933

== See also ==
- Literature of Romania
