= Marian Oprișan =

Romanian politician

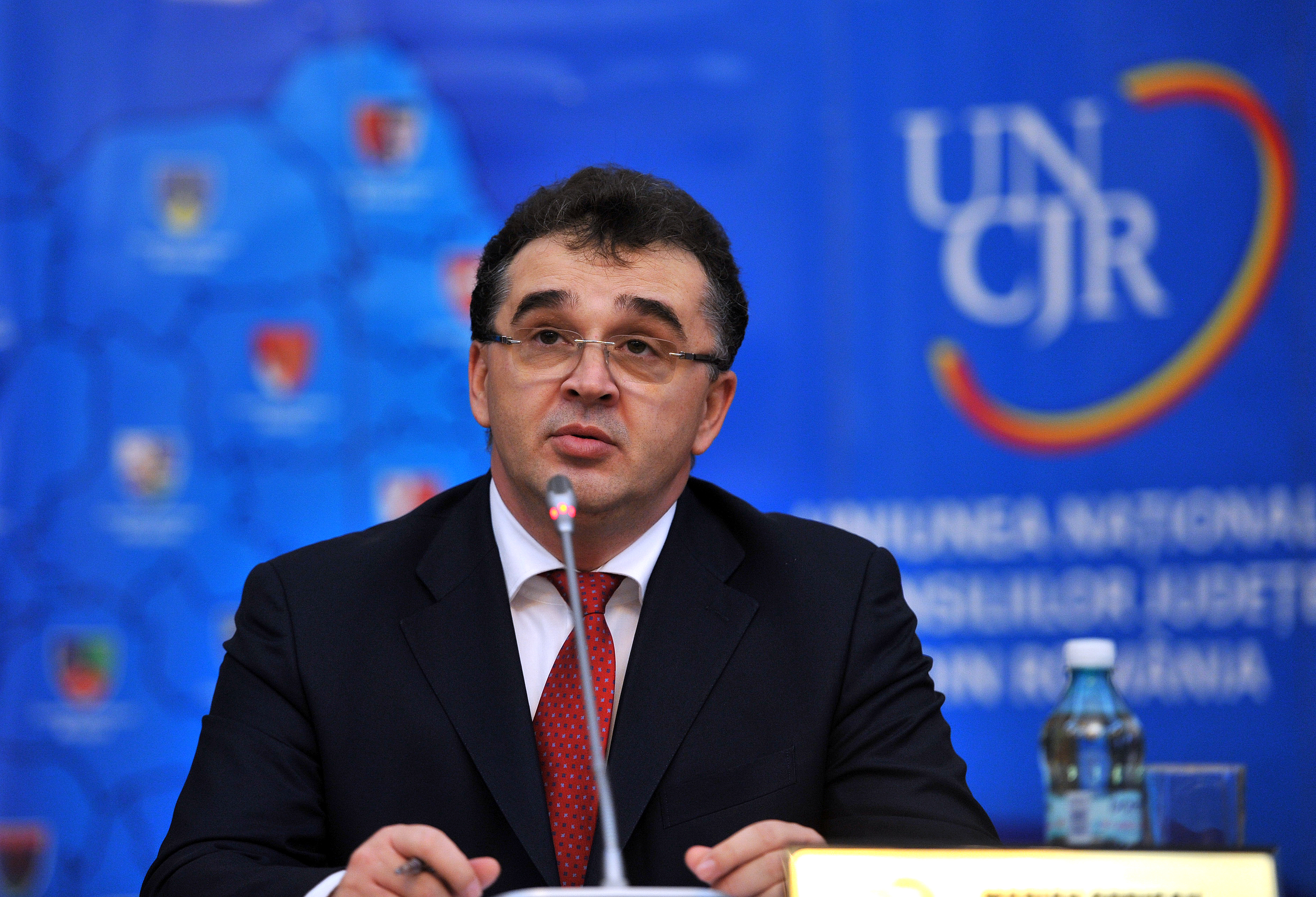
Oprișan in 2013

Marian Oprișan (born September 14, 1965) is a Romanian politician. A member of the Social Democratic Party (PSD), he has been President of the Vrancea County Council twice: in 1995-1996, and from 2000 to 2020.

== Biography ==
=== Politics ===
While in 9th grade in 1980, together with his entire class, Oprișan signed an agreement to collaborate with the Communist regime's Securitate secret police under the code name "Renato". However, according to the CNSAS, an institution charged with investigating Securitate affiliations, he did not provide any information of a political nature. From 1984 to 1990, he worked as a computer operator at a Focșani textile factory. From 1990 to 1995 Oprişan headed a company in Focșani. In 2003, he obtained a degree from the Political Science Faculty of the University of Iași.

Oprişan entered politics in 1990, when he became vice president of the National Salvation Front's youth wing, holding the position until 1992. That year, he was a founding member of what would become the PSD, and he also became vice president of the Vrancea County Council. He advanced to its presidency in 1995-1996, was again vice president in 1996-2000, and has again been president since 2000. From 2000 to 2002, he was president of the National Union of County Councils in Romania, and has been vice president since 2004. Within the PSD, he has been head of the Vrancea County chapter (June 1992-February 2003; July 2003-); member of the central executive bureau (1993-); vice president of the national council of PSD mayors and councillors (1999-); member of the national council (2001-); and a vice president (2010-).

At the 2020 local elections, Oprișan lost his bid for a new term as Vrancea County Council president. He was defeated by a National Liberal Party candidate by a margin of 44.4% to 40.5%. He was subsequently elected council vice president.

=== Controversies ===
Due to the influence he wielded within his party and county, Oprișan has been dubbed the quintessential "local baron" by the press. He has fought against the media, leading to mention of him in reports by the European Commission, the United States Department of State and a number of non-governmental organisations, and he has filed libel suits against several journalists, seeking significant damages. Two days prior to the 2004 election, copies of the local Ziarul de Vrancea were purchased from kiosks in bulk; the newspaper included an advertisement from the opposition Justice and Truth Alliance warning of possible electoral fraud, and Oprişan was suspected of but denied involvement in the copies' disappearance from shelves. Several days prior, copies of Academia Cațavencu, România Liberă and Evenimentul Zilei, all strongly against the then-governing PSD, did not even reach distribution.

In 2006, according to two reporters, his car was illegally parked on the sidewalk and they decided to photograph it; a furious Oprișan is said to have grabbed and smashed the camera as well as shout insults at the reporters. That year, the National Anticorruption Directorate filed charges against him, with the documents used in evidence having to be brought to the courthouse by truck. The allegations included abuse of power, using credits for purposes other than those intended; forgery and use of forgery; and embezzlement of 8 million lei (some $2.5 million at the time).

In the 1990s, he married Ofelia, a textile engineer. The couple had one daughter and divorced in 2003. In 2021, he married Mihaela Arbănaș, an employee of the Vrancea County Council, 19 years his junior.
