= Christian Tămaș =

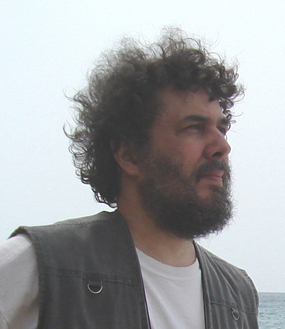
- Born: 13 November 1964 (age 61); Letca, Sălaj County, Romania
- Education: University of Bucharest; Alexandru Ioan Cuza University
- Occupations: Writer; translator; philosopher

Christian Tămaș (born 13 November 1964) is a Romanian writer, translator, essayist, arts and humanities researcher.

== Biography ==
Tămaș was born in the commune of Letca, in Sălaj County, northern Transylvania, Romania, on 13 November 1964. He graduated in Arabic language and literature from the University of Bucharest, in 1988. Later, in 2006, he obtained a master's degree in adult education at the Alexandru Ioan Cuza University in Iași and, in 2007, he earned a Doctorate in philosophy at the same university, with the thesis "Communication Strategies in the Qur'an".

His published works include novels, short stories, essays, literary criticism articles, scientific books and articles in the field of humanities, as well as translations from Italian, Arabic, Spanish, Catalan, French, English, Irish and Portuguese.

Since 2008, besides his research activity conducted at the Alexandru Ioan Cuza University, he delivers courses of Arabic language and civilization at the same university and at the Arab Cultural Center of Iași.

== List of published works and translations (selective) ==
- Tămaș, Christian (1993). Blestemul Catharilor sau Noaptea de dincolo de noapte: roman. Iași: Graphix. ISBN 973-95723-8-3. OCLC 895081249.
- Tămaș, Christian (1995). Labirint. Iași: Ars Longa. ISBN 9789739668149. OCLC 895578012.
- Trezirea la nemurire, Ars Longa, 1997
- Strategii de comunicare in Coran, Ars Longa, 2007
- Seán Ó Curraoin, Beairtle (translation from Irish), Ars Longa, 2008
- Gaetano Mollo, Dincolo de angoasă: educația etico-religoasă la Sören Kierkegaard (translation from Italian), Ars Longa, 2000
- Dairena Ní Chinnéide, Luptătoarea și alte poezii (translation from Irish), Ars Longa, 2008
- Crize contemporane: disoluția sacrului, Ars Longa, 2003
- Crize contemporane: ofensiva islamului, Ars Longa, 2004
- The White Silence, Ars Longa, 2007
- Ignațiu de Loyola (Ignatius of Loyola), Exerciții spirituale (translation from Spanish), Polirom, 1996
- Tadeusz Rostworowski, Din gindirea filosofică a papei Ioan Paul al II-lea (translation from Italian), Ars Longa, 1995
- El. Avatarurile unui articol hotărât, Ars Longa, 2012
- Carles Miralles, Dulci și aspre (translation from Catalan), Ars Longa, 2008

== Affiliations ==
- Romanian Association for Religious Studies
- Romanian Association of Semiotic Studies
- Réseau Francophone de Sociolinguistique (France)
- Center of Arabic Studies, University of Bucharest
- Writers' Union of Romania
- Société Internationale des Traducteurs d'Arabe (France)
- Maison Naaman pour la Culture (Lebanon)
- Casa del Poeta Peruano (Perú)

== Awards ==
- Prix Naaman (Lebanon), 2007
- Writers' Union of Romania Prize, 2008
- Gold Medal for Intellectual Excellence (Perú), 2012
