= George Poede =

Romanian political philosopher and professor emeritus

- Gheorghe Poede
- Born: January 29, 1952 (age 74)
- Occupation: Professor
- Awards: Ordre des Palmes Académiques

Academic background
- Education: Alexandru Ioan Cuza University
- Thesis: Domination and Power in Max Weber's Thought (1996)
- Doctoral advisor: Petre Dumitrescu
- Influences: Max Weber

Academic work
- Discipline: Political philosophy
- Institutions: Alexandru Ioan Cuza University
- Doctoral students: Taulant Balla

George Poede is a Romanian political philosopher, professor emeritus at Alexandru Ioan Cuza University in Iași. In 2016 he was nominated by the Ministry of National Education of the Republic of France for the Ordre des Palmes Académiques.

== Academic life ==
Poede was between 1979 and 1990 a university assistant in the chair of scientific socialism of the faculty of history and philosophy of Alexandru Ioan Cuza University in Iași. In 1990-91 he became a lector in the department of sociology and politics. In 1996 he earned a doctorate with a thesis on Domination and Power in Max Weber's Thought under the supervision of Petre Dumitrescu. He became associate professor in 2002 and full professor in 2006. In 2007 he obtained his habilitation to supervise doctoral research, and has supervised numerous doctorates since that time, including those of notable political figures such as Taulant Balla. In 2008 he ran for rector of Alexandru Ioan Cuza University, losing to Vasile Isan. He retired at the end of the 2016-2017 academic year. His areas of academic interest in the field of political philosophy have included the theory of knowledge and theories of power. One year after his retirement, he was granted the title of professor emeritus.
