= Constantin Eraclide =

Romanian jurist and politician

Constantin Eraclide (1819–1875) was a Romanian jurist and politician.

After studying abroad, Eraclide returned home to enter the magistracy. He served as judge, court president, prosecutor, member of the state council, member and then head at the Court of Cassation. In 1863, he was general secretary at the Justice Ministry. He was Justice Minister for two weeks in November 1868, after which he left politics.

The author of several legal studies, Erbiceanu taught law at the University of Iași.
