= Eugenia D. Soru =

Romanian chemist (1901–1988)

Eugenia D. Soru (17 May 1901 – 26 November 1988) was a Romanian biochemist. She graduated from the Faculty of Chemistry of the University of Iași in 1922, and obtained a doctor in chemistry degree in 1924. She then completed her professional preparation in Strasbourg (1925) and in Frankfurt and London (1934). Soru worked in Bucharest as a head of laboratory (1944–1955), head of department, and head of the enzymology laboratory at the Cantacuzino Institute and as lecturer (1969) at the Faculty of Medicine. She was elected in 1955 as a corresponding member of the Romanian Academy. In 1954 Soru was distinguished with the State Prize.

== Life ==
Eugenia D. Soru was born on 17 May 190 in Piatra Neamț. Soru went to study at a high school in Iași after finishing elementary school in her native city. She then attended the Faculty of Chemistry of the University of Iași, graduating in 1922, and obtained a doctor in chemistry degree in 1924. Her doctoral thesis was titled Potenţialele metalelor în lichidele pure (Potentials of metals in pure liquids). She then completed her professional preparation overseas in Strasbourg (1925) and in Frankfurt and London (1934), working in biochemistry, biophysics and bacterial biochemistry.

Soru worked in Bucharest as head of laboratory (1944–1955), head of department, and head of the enzymology laboratory at the Cantacuzino Institute, and was also an associate lecturer at the Faculty of Medicine of the University of Bucharest Soru published over 200 papers, including in journals such as Bulletin de l’Académie de Sciences, Archives de Physique biologique, and Archives Roumaines de Pathologie et de Microbiologie. Her 1954 Treatise on Medical Biochemistry was considered a fundamental contribution to the field.

She was elected in 1955 corresponding member of the Romanian Academy. She was a member of the Academy of Medical Sciences from 1969, and of the Society of Biological Chemistry in Paris. In 1954 Soru was distinguished with the State Prize.

Soru died in Iași on 26 November 1988 at the age 87.
