= Grigore Brișcu =

Grigore Brișcu (1884 in Bârlad – 1965 in Bucharest) was a Romanian engineer and inventor.

== Biography ==
At age 19, he enrolled in the National School of Bridges and Roads in Bucharest. While pursuing his engineering degree, he took some technical courses in Paris and also earned a law degree from the University of Iași.

== Inventor of the helicopter ==
In 1909, Brișcu was the first engineer to begin experimenting with the cyclic variation of rotor blade pitch to ensure horizontal flight and stability in helicopters. He invented a prototype "air-carriage" with all the features of a helicopter-like flying-machine: horizontal, vertical and lateral movement and fixed-point landing. It was equipped with two coaxial propellers rotating in opposite directions. This was flown experimentally by the French aviator Paul Cornu, who built a prototype with an Antoinett engine. The Brișcu rotary engine was patented by the Romanian Office for Inventions (patent no. 2323/2046 of 1912).
