= Tudor Măinescu =

Romanian poet, prose writer and translator

Tudor Măinescu (born Constantin Măinescu; 23 February 1892 – 15 March 1977) was a Romanian poet, prose writer, and translator.

Born in Caracal, his parents were Vasile Măinescu, a clerk at Poșta Română, and his wife Theonia (née Dobritescu). He attended primary school and gymnasium in Craiova, Bucharest, and Mizil, and high school in Ploiești and Galați. He studied for a year at the medical faculty of the University of Bucharest, followed by another at the Dramatic Arts Conservatory under Constantin I. Nottara. Măinescu then entered the law faculty at Bucharest, transferring to the University of Iași and earning his degree there in 1923. The following year, he entered the magistracy as a judge's assistant in Celaru, Dolj County. He then became a judge at the tribunal in Slatina, working his way up the hierarchy to become an adviser at the court of appeal in Bucharest.

Măinescu made his published debut with satirical verses in Scena magazine in 1916. Noticed by George Topîrceanu, he was presented and published in the latter's Însemnări literare magazine in 1919. His first book, the 1929 poetry volume O picătură de parfum..., drew favorable reviews from Alexandru A. Philippide, Tudor Arghezi and Demostene Botez. He subsequently published books of epigrams (Surâs..., 1931), poems (O fată mică se închină, 1935), sketches and stories (Întâmplări vesele pentru oameni triști, 1943) and made ample contributions to Viața Românească, Gândul nostru, Adevărul literar și artistic, Vremea, Universul literar, Bilete de Papagal, Curentul literar, Universul, and Veac nou.

He became more prolific after 1944, publishing new books of verse (Flori și ghimpi, 1956; Florile prieteniei, 1959; Versuri clare, 1961; Florile vieții, 1962; Soare cu dinți, 1972), satires, fables and epigrams (Muzică ușoară, 1961), satirical sketches and tales (Schițe oarecum vesele, 1966; Curățitorii de pete, 1974), and children's books (Bagaje ușoare, 1961; Azi, Neptun și Nicușor vor să facă un vapor, 1965; Pățaniile fraților Chiț-Chiț, 1965; 3 și cu Roșcatu 4, 1968; Dana, Dan și Roboțel, 1976). His work appeared in Gazeta literară, Steaua, Iașul literar, Orizont, Tribuna, Albina, Tânărul scriitor, Familia, Presa noastră, Cravata roșie, Luminița, Arici Pogonici, and Urzica. In 1966, he prefaced and put together a volume of Cincinat Pavelescu's epigrams. Authors he translated include Victor Hugo, Anna Seghers, Pavel Antokolsky, Samuil Marshak, Jean Racine, Martial, Jean de La Fontaine, Marcel Aymé, Stephen Leacock, and Juvenal.
