= Nicolae Leon =

Romanian biologist (1862–1931)

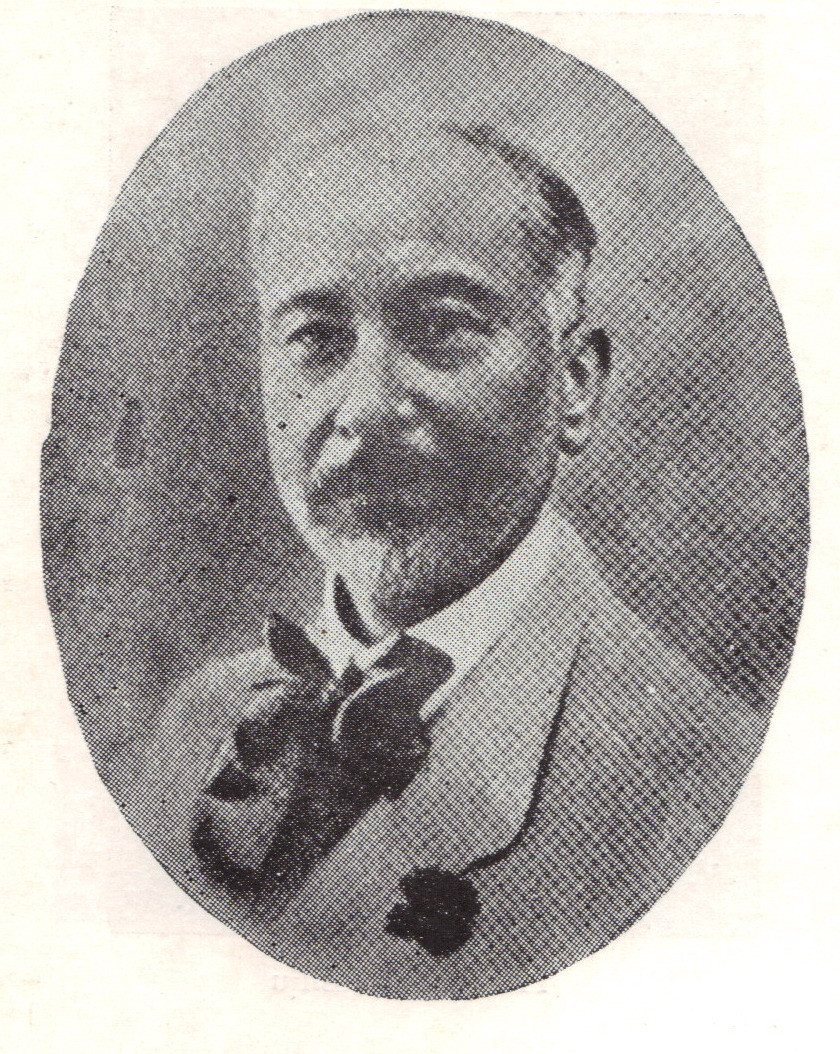
Nicolae Leon (1862–1931)

Nicolae Leon (April 15, 1862 – October 4, 1931) was a Romanian biologist. He was the elder half brother of the naturalist Grigore Antipa.

Leon was born in Băiceni, a village in Curtești commune in Botoșani County. Starting in 1881 he studied at the Faculty of Medicine of the University of Iași. In 1884 he went to the University of Jena to study zoology, obtaining his degree in 1887. After returning to Iași, he became a professor at the Faculty of Medicine in 1889. Later on he was Dean of the Faculty of Medicine and then Rector of the University of Iași in 1918 and 1920–1921.
