= Annunciation Church, Iași =

Heritage site in Iași County, Romania

Coordinates: 47.1717°N 27.5807°E

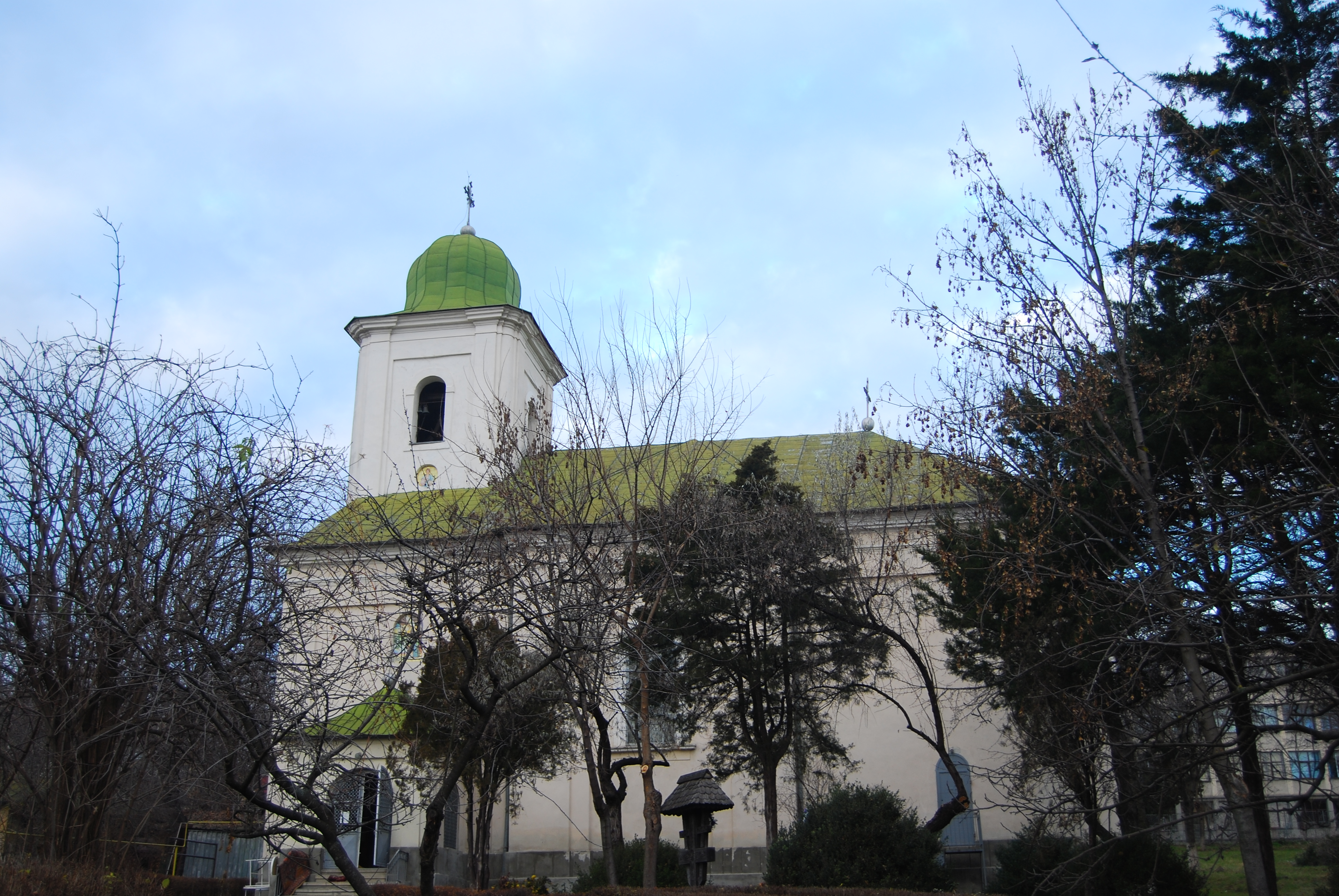
Annunciation Church

The Annunciation Church (Romanian: Biserica Buna Vestire) is a Romanian Orthodox church located at 12 Sulfinei Street in Iași, Romania. It is dedicated to the Annunciation.

The original church on the site was made of wood. First mentioned in 1707, it was likely built in the second half of the 17th century. This date derives from the appearance of surviving icons and the fact that the area (known as Muntenimii) was starting to become populated at the time, by craftsmen and Roma. By the later 18th century, documents mentioned the church frequently, highlighting its importance. There is an inscribed cross marking the spot where the altar of this church once stood. It probably lasted around a century and a half, gradually becoming too small for the needs of the area. Eventually, the neighborhood was settled by wealthier people interested in building a larger and prettier church.

The present building was constructed by ktitor Ion Tăutu, a vornic, and his wife Maria between 1816 and 1818; it was blessed by Metropolitan Veniamin Costache in 1820. The design was inspired by a church in Flămânzi that Tăutu's friend Theodor Balș built in 1813. The old church lasted until the 1821 outbreak of the Greek War of Independence, which had reverberations in Moldavia; Ottoman troops pillaged and destroyed it. This is attested by a stone carved in Romanian Cyrillic, located along the northern wall of the present building. According to historian N. A. Bogdan, who wrote at the turn of the 20th century, the foundations were still visible some forty years prior. Another theory holds that the new church was built only after the old one was destroyed, possibly because Tăutu was grateful to have avoided execution during the revolutionary upheaval, and because he brought back news that native rather than Phanariote princes would henceforth rule Moldavia.

Distinctive features of the new church include its large and nearly round nave, as well as its small vestibule. There is a noted oil portrait of Tăutu in oriental dress with Maria appearing in western style. Another painting, located in the vestibule, commissioned by Tăutu's sister and executed in 1829, shows part of 18th-century Iași in panorama. The roof was redone in the 1850s, and the foyer repaired in 1875. The iconostasis was carved in oak and linden from 1858 to 1860 before being coated in gold and silver leaf. The fresco painting dates to 1859. During the 19th and early 20th centuries, the church had several wealthy donors, including Mihail Kogălniceanu (who married in the church), Theodor Pallady and Prince Carol I of Romania. It owned houses, land, money and precious liturgical items. Bishop Meletie Stavropoleos donated five houses for the clergy and staff. From the property income, the parish was able to pay a choir director and soloists. Repairs were carried out from 1975 to 1977, and the walls were repainted from 1978 to 1979. Metropolitan Teoctist Arăpașu blessed the church a second time in 1980.

The church is listed as a historic monument by Romania's Ministry of Culture and Religious Affairs.
