= Anton Naum =

Romanian poet and translator

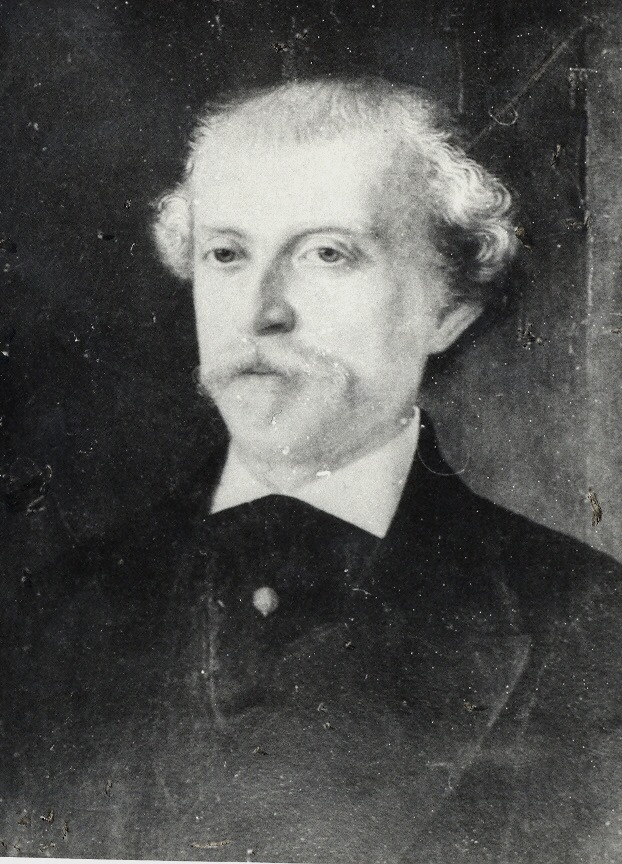
Anton Naum

Anton Naum (January 17, 1829–August 27, 1917) was a Moldavian, later Romanian poet and translator.

Born in Iași, his parents were Theodor Naum, a small-time merchant and landlord, and his wife Zamfira (née Nactu); both were of Aromanian origin. He studied at Academia Mihăileană in his native city. This was followed, from 1858 to 1865, by courses at the literature faculty of the University of Paris and the Collège de France. Upon his return home in 1865 and until 1892, he began working as a high school teacher, offering classes in history and French at Iași's Institutele Unite, Central High School, military school and Vasile Lupu Normal School. From 1868 to 1871, he was primary school inspector for the counties of Roman, Botoșani, Suceava, Neamț and Iași. In October 1897, he was called as a substitute professor at Iași University in place of the deceased Ștefan Vârgolici and began teaching in the department of modern Romance literature. He was soon made a full professor of French, retiring in 1907 but continuing to teach until 1909.

A member of Junimea since 1872, from that year he was a consistent contributor to the pages of its organ, Convorbiri Literare, writing original and translated poetry. He was the oldest member of the society, nicknamed "chaste Naum" for his modesty and reserve. His first book was Aegri somnia (1876), followed by Versuri (1890) and Povestea vulpei (1902). He became a corresponding member of the Romanian Academy in 1887, and was elevated to titular status in 1893. He translated Nicolas Boileau-Despréaux (the entirety of L'Art poétique), Frédéric Mistral (in 1882, he received a prize at the Floral Games in Forcalquier for his rendition of Mirèio's first canto), André Chénier, Victor Hugo, Théophile Gautier, François Ponsard and Alfred de Musset. His poems tended toward the classical but were receptive to pre-romantic and romantic rhetorical influences, in the same vein as Barbu Paris Mumuleanu, Vasile Cârlova and Grigore Alexandrescu.

By his early 50s, Naum had become a depressed, aging bachelor with suicidal tendencies who suffered from extreme shyness toward women. However, at age 53, he married Ecaterina Pandeli, almost thirty years his junior. Naum then found renewed motivation in life, his looks improved, he abandoned his isolated existence, and his appetite for writing increased. The couple had two sons: Alexandru, who went on to teach art history at Iași; and philologist Teodor Naum.
