= Constantin Climescu =

Romanian mathematician (1844–1926)

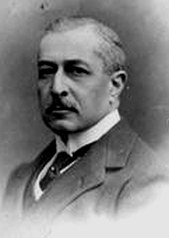
Constantin Climescu

Constantin Climescu (30 November 1844 – 6 August 1926) was a Moldavian, later Romanian mathematician and politician.

Born in Bacău, he attended the princely academy in Iași, followed by the sciences faculty of Iași University. He then left for the École Normale Supérieure in Paris, and in 1870, took his undergraduate degree from the University of Paris, in mathematics and physical sciences. He was a professor of analytic geometry and spherical trigonometry at Iași University from 1871 to 1909, served as dean of the sciences faculty from 1880 to 1901, and as rector of the university from 1901 to 1907.

Meanwhile, from 1884 to 1896, he taught at the upper normal school of Iași, and was among the founders of Recreații Științifice periodical in 1883; its chief contributor, he wrote articles on arithmetic, elementary and analytical geometry, algebra and mathematical analysis. He also belonged to the editorial board of Gazeta Matematică, where he wrote on the historiography of mathematics. He wrote several textbooks that were widely used at the time, on algebra (1887), rational-number arithmetic (1890), elementary geometry (1891) and analytic geometry (1898); the last volume was the second of its type to appear in Romania. He was elected a corresponding member of the Romanian Academy in 1892.

A member of the National Liberal Party, he was elected to the Assembly of Deputies for Bacău in 1884, and represented Iași in the Senate from 1889 to 1910. He was an officer of the Order of the Star of Romania, and a commander of the Order of the Crown. He left the university when he reached the retirement age in 1909, died in 1926 and was buried in Eternitatea cemetery.
