= Ion Th. Simionescu =

Romanian geologist, paleontologist and naturalist

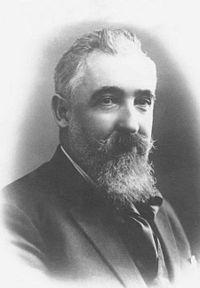
Ion Th. Simionescu

Ion Th. Simionescu (born Ion Gheorghiu; 10 July 1873 – 7 January 1944) was a Romanian geologist, paleontologist and naturalist.

== Biography ==
Born in Fântânele, Bacău County, his parents Maria and Toader Gheorghiu died when he was a young child. He moved to Botoșani to be raised by his maternal grandmother. There, between 1879 and 1883, he attended the same primary school as Nicolae Iorga, who was two grades ahead. Subsequently, between 1883 and 1890, he attended A. T. Laurian High School. In the autumn of 1890, he enrolled in Iași University's sciences faculty. Among his professors were Grigore Cobălcescu and Petru Poni. After graduation in 1894, he briefly worked as a substitute teacher at his high school. In 1895, with a scholarship from the Romanian Academy, he left for the University of Vienna. There, he specialized in paleontology and geology, defending his thesis in the latter subject in 1898. He then went to the University of Grenoble, where he completed his paleontological studies. He returned to Romania in 1899 and won a competition to become a professor at the Iași mineralogy department. In 1905, he became a full professor, rising to dean of the sciences faculty in 1910. He was elected a corresponding member of the Romanian Academy, advancing to titular member in 1911. A member of the National Liberal Party, in 1919, he was elected to the Chamber of Deputies for a Botoșani seat. He served as rector at Iași from 1922 to 1923. In 1929, he became a professor at the University of Bucharest where one of his students was geologist and paleontologist Emilia Săulea. He also held important positions within the Education Ministry. He was president of the Romanian Academy from 1941 to 1944. Writing in late July 1941, amidst the ongoing Operation Barbarossa but before the Transnistria Governorate was set up, he praised the liberation of "our Transnistrian brothers", accomplished "thanks to the freedom-bringing German and Romanian armies".

He wrote extensively about paleontology and stratigraphy, describing 707 taxa, of which at least 98 were previously unknown. Over the course of seventeen paleontological works, he named and defined the Volhynian, Bessarabian and Khersonian substages of the Sarmatian. He published a treatise on geology in 1927 and a number of studies on Romania's rock formations, particularly Dâmbovicioara, Dobrudja and the Moldavian Plateau. He was the thesis adviser to Gheorghe Macovei, who in 1909 earned the first geology doctorate in Romania. Aside from his research, he made efforts to popularize science, traveling widely and holding hundreds of conferences in locations ranging from the Romanian Athenaeum to Șendriceni village.
