= Fritz Netolitzky =

German botanist

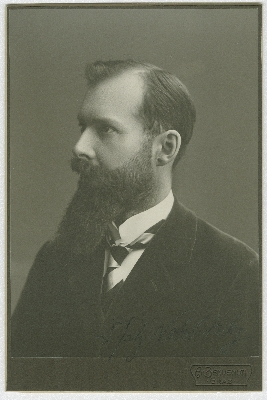
Fritz Netolitzky in 1912

Fritz Netolitzky (1 October 1875 – 1945) was a German botanist (morphology and anatomy) and entomologist who specialised in Coleoptera. He described many new species. Fritz Netolitzky was born in Zwickau on 1 October 1875 into a respected family who had lived in Rokitnitz (Eastern Bohemia) since the early 18th century. His grandfather taught him natural history and Fritz Netolitzky went on to study in Prague, Vienna and Strasbourg. Aged 24 he gained a Ph.D. in medicine. Following this he served as a Kaiserjäger for one year and he also served as a doctor on a ‘Kosmos-Linie’ ship registered in Hamburg, a journey which took him along the South American west coast. Fritz Netolitzky taught at the University of Vienna (1896-1899), then at the University of Innsbruck (1899-1904) then at the University of Graz (1904-1910). From 1910 to 1940 he taught at the University of Chernivtsi.From 1940 to 1941 he worked at the University of Iasi, then he was Professor of Botany at the University of Vienna. With his sister Magdalena and brother, Richard, Fritz Netolitzky wrote a parody of Heinrich Hoffman's Struwwelpeter set in Egypt- The Egyptian Struwwelpeter (London: H. Grevel & Co., [1896]

== Works ==
Botany

- Netolitzky F. 1926. Anatomie der Angiospermen-Samen. Handbuch der Pflanzenanatomie. Abt. 2, 2(10). Berlin: Gebr. Bornträger. 1–364. ed. Karl Linsbauer.
- Netolitzky F. 1923. Das tropische Parenchym. A. Assimilationsgewebe. in Handbuch der Pflanzenanatomie. Abt. 1: Allgemeiner Teil. T. 2: Histologie, Bd. 41 BerlinG. Borntraeger 1923 ed.Fritz Jürgen Meyer.
- Netolitsky F. 1943. Nachweise von Nahrungs- und Heilmitteln in den Trockenleichen von Naga-ed-Der (Ägypten). Mitteilungen des Deutschen Instituts für Ägyptische Altertumskunde in Kairo, Bd. 1, Ergänzungshefte 11: 1-33, 22 plates

Entomology

- Netolitzky, F. 1910. Bemerkungen zur Systematik in der Gattung Bembidion Latr. Wiener Entomologische Zeitung, 29: 209-228.
- Netolitzky, F. 1914. Die Bembidiini in Winklers Catalogus. I-II. Entomologische Blätter, 10: 50-55, 164-176.
- Netolitzky, F. 1914. Bembidion (Bracteon) fusiforme nov. spec. (Col.). Entomologische Mitteilungen, 3: 168-169.
- Fritz Netolitzky 1919). Käfer als Nahrungs und Heilmittel Aus eigener medizinischer Erfahrung kenne ich noch die starke Reizwirkung des Oxytelus tetracarinatus Block, der wohl schon jedem Radfahrer in die Augen geflogen ist; er ist die Mücke, die unerträgliches Brennen im Auge verursacht, wenn bei Sonnenuntergang die Landstraße von diesem winzigen Dungkäfer wimmelt.
- Netolitzky, F. 1921. Catalogus systematicus specierum palaearcticarum generis Bembidion Latr. (Carabidae). Archiv für Naturgeschichte, Series A, 87: 185-229.
- Netolitzky, F. 1926. Bemerkungen über Bembidion-Larven. Entomologische Blätter, 22: 117-119.
- Netolitzky, F. 1927. Gedanken über die Urform und das natürlische System der Bembidiini und der mit ihnen nächstverwandten Carabidengruppen. Koleopterologische Rundschau, 13: 100-112.
- Netolitzky, F. 1928. Bembidion Gebieni n. sp. aus China. Koleopterologische Rundschau, 14: 168.
- Netolitzky, F. 1931. Kritisches zum Katalog der Harpalinae von Csiki, etc. Deutsche entomologische Zeitschrift, 153-167.
- Netolitzky, F., and P. Meyer. 1933. Die Verbreitung des Bembidion argenteolum Ahr. Entomologische Blätter, 29(4): 2 unnumbered pages and 1 map.
- Netolitzky, F., and P. Meyer. 1939. Die Verbreitung des Bembidion velox L. (Besonders dem Norden und Osten eigen). Entomologische Blätter, 35(4): 4 unnumbered pages and 1 map.
- Netolitzky, F. 1940. Bestimmungstabellen der Bembidion-Arten Europas, Asiens und Afrikas. Buletinul Facultatii de Stiinte din Cernauti, 13(1939): 144-179.
- Netolitzky, F. 1942, 1943. Bestimmungstabelle der Bembidion-Arten des paläarktischen Gebietes. Koleopterologische Rundschau, 28: 29-124, 29: 1-70.
