= Leon Sculy Logothetides =

Romanian politician and surgeon

Leon Sculy Logothetides (also known as Sculy Logotheti or only Sculy, sometimes Scully or, erroneously, Scully-Logothely) (born in 1853, Piatra Neamț, Principality of Moldavia – died in 1912, Iași, Kingdom of Romania) was a Romanian politician (member of the Chamber of Deputies) and surgeon, professor at the Faculty of Medicine from Iași, one of the founders of the surgery school in Iași.

== Biography ==
Leon Sculy descended from a family of Greek origin, his parents being Sculy Logothetides (Sculy, the surname, was transformed in name in the next generation), low-ranking boyar installed in Piatra Neamț, and Caliopi Caraghioz. He had a brother, Vasile Sculy (1844–1918), lawyer, MP and senator, married to Sofia Exarhu, and a sister, Cleopatra. The second Leon Sculy of this family was his nephew, son of Vasile, married to Princess Marguerite Marie Catherine Caradja (1893–1933) from the Caradja aristocratic family.

Sculy attended high school in Paris, followed by medical studies at the Faculty of Medicine of the University of Montpellier and the Faculty of Medicine of the University of Paris. Obtaining a doctorate in medicine and surgery in 1879, he returned to Iași, and, the same year, he was appointed Associate Professor of Anatomy and Histology at the newly created Faculty of Medicine. On 1/13 December 1879 he was in charge of the inaugural lesson at that medical school.

Leon Sculy was formed as surgeon in the clinic of Ludovic Russ senior. Named professor of surgery in 1881, he was the first dean of the Faculty of Medicine from Iași (1879–1881). Organizer of the health care, his efforts led to the creation of a second surgical service in Iași, the service in which he approached the surgical treatment of abdominal, thoraco-pulmonary and neurosurgical diseases. Leon Sculy was the first to practice in Romania, in December 1904 – January 1905, the pulmonary decortication for chronic pleural empyema.

Introducing asepsis and antisepsis, sterilization of equipment in an autoclave and the use of sterile water for hand washing in his surgical service, Leon Sculy was among the first to use radiology in Romania, installing a diagnostic unit at Saint Spyridon Hospital in Iași. Under his leadership were trained personalities of the Romanian surgery school, such as Ernest Juvara, Ion Tănăsescu, Paul Anghel, and Nicolae Hortolomei.
