= Ghenadie Valuța =

- Citizenship: Moldova
- Occupation: Orthodox Priest
- Organization: Some Orthodox Church
- Known for: anti-LGBT protests, anti-abortion preaches, general conservative views
- Criminal charge: Animal abuse
- Criminal penalty: Fine
- Church: Russian Orthodox Church
- Metropolis: Metropolis of Chișinău and All Moldova

Ghenadie Valuța is a Moldovan priest and social activist. He is a member of the Metropolis of Chișinău and All Moldova under the Russian Orthodox Church. An active commentator in the social and mainstream media, he is president of an association called Pro-Ortodoxia. Among other controversies, he has become known for his campaigns against homosexuality and LGBT rights. He attended the pride parades of 2017 and 2018 in Moldova's capital, Chișinău, in order to splash the streets with holy water after the end of the marches.

== Political involvement ==
In 2013, when the parliament of Moldova was about to vote on the repeal of its legislation against the promotion of LGTB issues to minors, a law similar to Russia's "gay progapanda" ban, protesters, including Orthodox Christians, surrounded the parliament building in an attempt to stop lawmakers from voting on the measure, and Valuța told AFP, "Today they are allowing this propaganda and tomorrow they will allow gay marriages." In 2014, Valuța led a campaign before the Metropolis of Chișinău and All Moldova calling for the formation of an Orthodox position towards the moral-social dimension of the European integration project and the highlighting of its anti-Orthodox elements. In 2016, he was reported to have sponsored the campaign of socialist candidate Igor Dodon to the Presidency of the Republic of Moldova. In 2017 he led a group of priests calling for the repeal or amendment of the Law for Equal Opportunities, on the grounds that it had in practice concentrated exclusively on the promotion of the rights of sexual minorities.
