= Ion Tănăsescu (surgeon) =

Romanian surgeon and anatomist

Ion Tănăsescu (September 1, 1875 – January 25, 1954) was a Romanian surgeon and anatomist.

Born in Fălticeni, he began high school in his native town, but later moved to Iași, graduating in 1896. From that year until 1902, he studied medicine at the University of Iași; his thesis dealt with hydrocele and its treatment. Upon graduating, he performed his military service in a Roșiori cavalry regiment. In 1903, he left for Paris, where he attended the surgical clinics of professors Henri Albert Hartmann, Théodore Tuffier, and Paul Poirier. Working in the latter's anatomical laboratory, his aptitude was quickly noticed and he was selected to prepare the dissection specimens that the professor used in his courses. During this period, Tănăsescu published a number of works on anatomy that showed his meticulousness as a researcher and wish to explore more obscure areas.

Upon his return from Paris in 1907, he was named surgical assistant at the clinic led by Leon Sculy Logothetides. After passing an examination and going through a competition, he was hired as a professor at the Iași anatomy department. In 1912, when Ernest Juvara left for the national capital Bucharest, he was named professor of topographic anatomy and clinical surgery. The following year, when the department was split, Tănăsescu remained in the surgery field, and continued as professor until he was obliged to retire in 1940. Both in the Second Balkan War and in World War I, he served as a combat medic. In 1933, as a result of his efforts, the clinical surgery palace at Sfântul Spiridon Hospital was completed, and one of the country's most modern surgery departments moved into the new building. From 1930 to 1935, he was dean of the medical faculty, and was elected rector in 1938, serving until 1940. He died in Bucharest in 1954.

Alongside his prodigious publishing activity, Tănăsescu was president of the Iași doctors' and naturalists' society from 1914 to 1920 and corresponding member of the Société Nationale de Chirurgie from 1929. He also belonged to the International Society of Surgery. Considered the founder of modern surgery in the Moldavia region, a number of his students became both prominent anatomists and surgeons. The latter group included Nicolae Hortolomei, Vladimir Buțureanu, and Gheorghe Chipail.
