= Viorel P. Barbu =

Romanian mathematician

Viorel P. Barbu (born 14 June 1941) is a Romanian mathematician, specializing in partial differential equations, control theory, and stochastic differential equations.

== Biography ==
He was born in Deleni, Vaslui County, Romania. He attended the Mihail Kogălniceanu High School in Vaslui and then the Costache Negruzzi National College in Iași. Barbu completed his undergraduate degree at the Alexandru Ioan Cuza University of Iași in 1964, and his Ph.D. at the same university in 1969. His doctoral advisor was Adolf Haimovici; his dissertation thesis was titled Regularity Theory of Pseudodifferential Operators. He became a professor at the University of Iași in 1980.

In 1993, he was elected a titular member of the Romanian Academy. In 2011 he was awarded the Order of the Star of Romania, Knight rank by President Traian Băsescu.

== Bibliography ==
Some of his books and papers are:

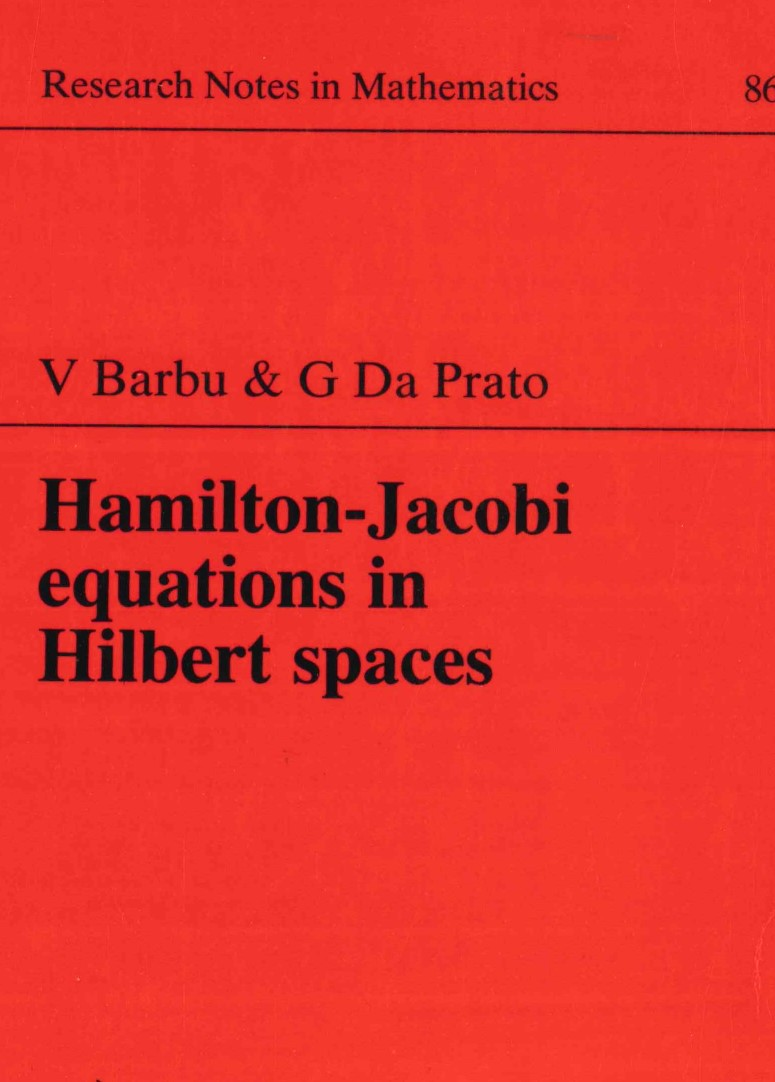
G. Da Prato, V. Barbu Hamilton-Jacobi equations in Hilbert spaces, 1983

- Analysis And Control Of Nonlinear Infinite Dimensional Systems
- Optimization, Optimal Control and Partial Differential Equations
- Nonlinear semigroups and differential equations in Banach spaces
- Hamilton-Jacobi Equations on Hilbert Space
- Stochastic Porous Media Equations
- Nonlinear Differential Equations of Monotone Types in Banach Spaces
- Convexity and Optimization in Banach Spaces
- Optimal Control of Variational Inequalities
