= Nicolae Dașcovici =

- Nicolae Dașcovici
- Born: February 13, 1888; Calafat, Romania
- Died: February 22, 1969 (aged 81); Bucharest, Romania
- Known for: Secretary General of the Ministry of National Education

Nicolae Dașcovici (born February 13, 1888, Calafat – d. February 22, 1969, Bucharest) was a jurist, politician, historian, university professor, Romanian diplomat and Romanian publicist, corresponding member (from 1948) of the Romanian Academy.

Dașcovici was a member of several Romanian and international scientific societies: Romanian Social Institute, Romanian Naval League, The Econometric Society (Colorado Springs), Royal Economic Society (London), Permanent Office of International Legal Documentation (The Hague). Corresponding member of the Romanian Academy (June 1, 1948). Decorated with the Romanian Star with swords and the War Cross with the "Mărășești" bar.
