= Nicolae Culianu =

Romanian astronomer and mathematician (1832–1915)

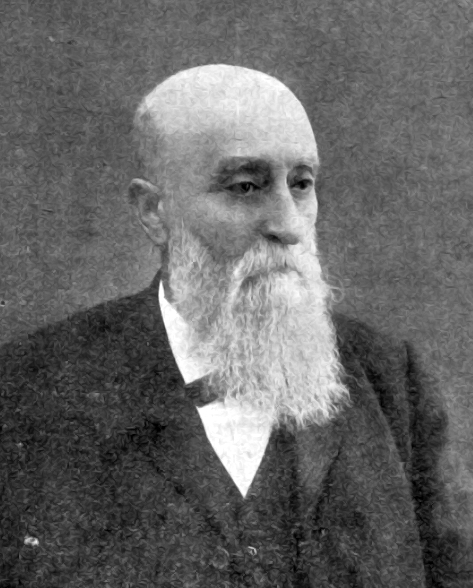
Nicolae Culianu

Nicolae Culianu (28 August 1832 – 28 November 1915) was a Moldavian, later Romanian mathematician and astronomer.

A native of Iași, he enrolled in the University of Paris after graduating from Academia Mihăileană in 1855, and earned his undergraduate degree in mathematics in 1860. He remained there until 1863, performing research at the Paris Observatory. Initially a high school teacher, he later joined the astronomy and geodesy faculty of the University of Iași, where he served as dean of the sciences faculty, and from 1880 to 1898 as rector. He was a close associate of Titu Maiorescu, a member of the Junimea movement that the latter led, and involved in the educational reform movement it promoted. As such, he was among the founders of a private high school in Iași, to which he donated a group of buildings. While active in Junimea, his renowned affability and venerable bearing earned him the nickname "Papa Culiano". He was elected a corresponding member of the Romanian Academy in 1889.

He helped found the Iași astronomical observatory for the use of students and teachers, and published textbooks on mathematics and geodesy. He was among the founders Recreații Științifice, the country's first scientific periodical addressed to young people and to a generalist audience. Briefly involved in politics, he was vice president of the Romanian Senate during the fourth conservative government of Lascăr Catargiu (1892–1896).

Culianu's textbooks include an 1870 one on differential and integral calculus, the first published Romanian-language course on mathematical analysis; and ones on elementary algebra (1872), applied geometry (1874), plane and spherical trigonometry (1875), cosmography (1893), plane trigonometry (1894), and high-school cosmography (1895). He was buried in Eternitatea Cemetery. His great-grandson was Ioan Petru Culianu.
