= Octav Mayer =

Romanian mathematician (1895–1966)

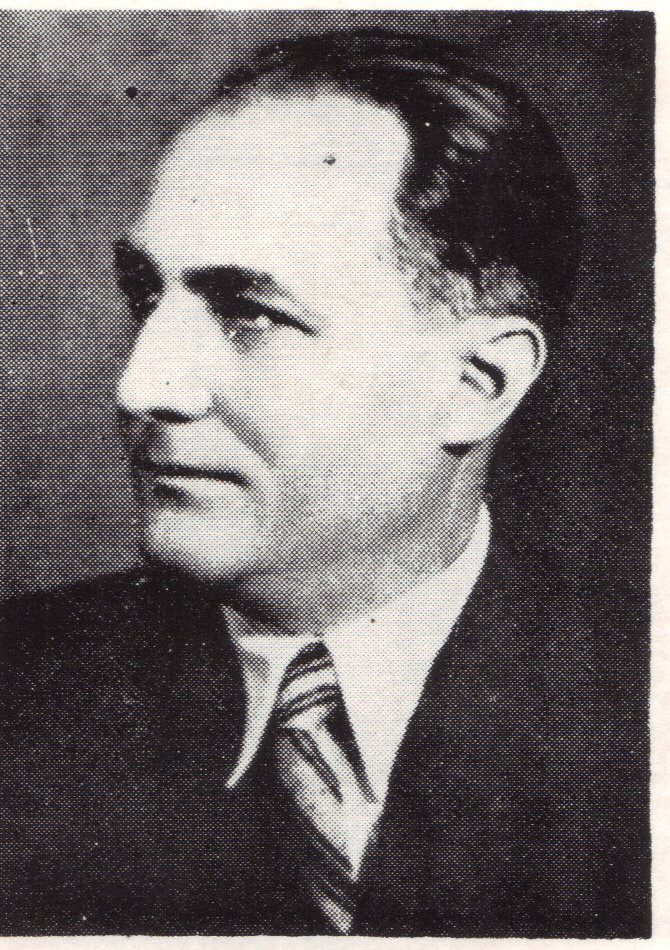
Octav Mayer

Octav Mayer (5 October [O.S. 23 September] 1895 – 9 September 1966) was a Romanian mathematician, the first to earn a doctorate in Romania.

Born in Mizil, Prahova County, Mayer went to the primary school in Târgu Neamț and pursued his studies in an elementary school in Focșani. He then went to the National College in Iași, where he obtained his baccalaureate, and then studied mathematics at the University of Iași, where he obtained his undergraduate degree. In 1915, Mayer enrolled in the School of Artillery and Military Engineering and took part in the battles on the Romanian front in World War I from 1916 to 1918. After the war, he completed his Ph.D. at the University of Iași in 1920; his thesis, written under the direction of Alexander Myller, was titled Contributions à la théorie des quartiques bicirculaires. Mayer later became a professor at the University of Iași. He was elected titular member of the Romanian Academy in 1955. He died in Iași in 1966, at age 71.

The Octav Mayer Institute of Mathematics of the Romanian Academy (located in Iași) is named after him.
