= Alexander Myller =

Romanian mathematician (1879–1965)

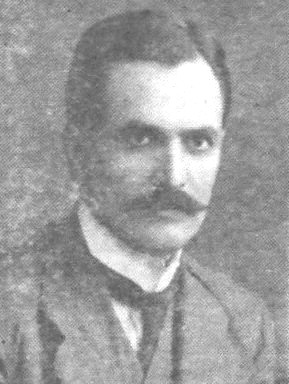
- Born: 1879
- Died: 1965 (aged 85–86)
- Citizenship: Romanian
- Education: Georg-August-Universität Göttingen (PhD)
- Scientific career
- Fields: mathematics
- Thesis: Gewöhnliche Differentialgleichungen höherer Ordnung in ihrer Beziehung zu den Integralgleichungen (1906)
- Doctoral advisor: David Hilbert
- Doctoral students: Ilie Popa

Alexander Myller (1879–1965) was a Romanian mathematician and professor at the Alexandru Ioan Cuza University of Iași.
