= Ion Luca Caragiale National College (Bucharest) =

High-school in Bucharest, Romania

- Colegiul Național I. L. Caragiale București
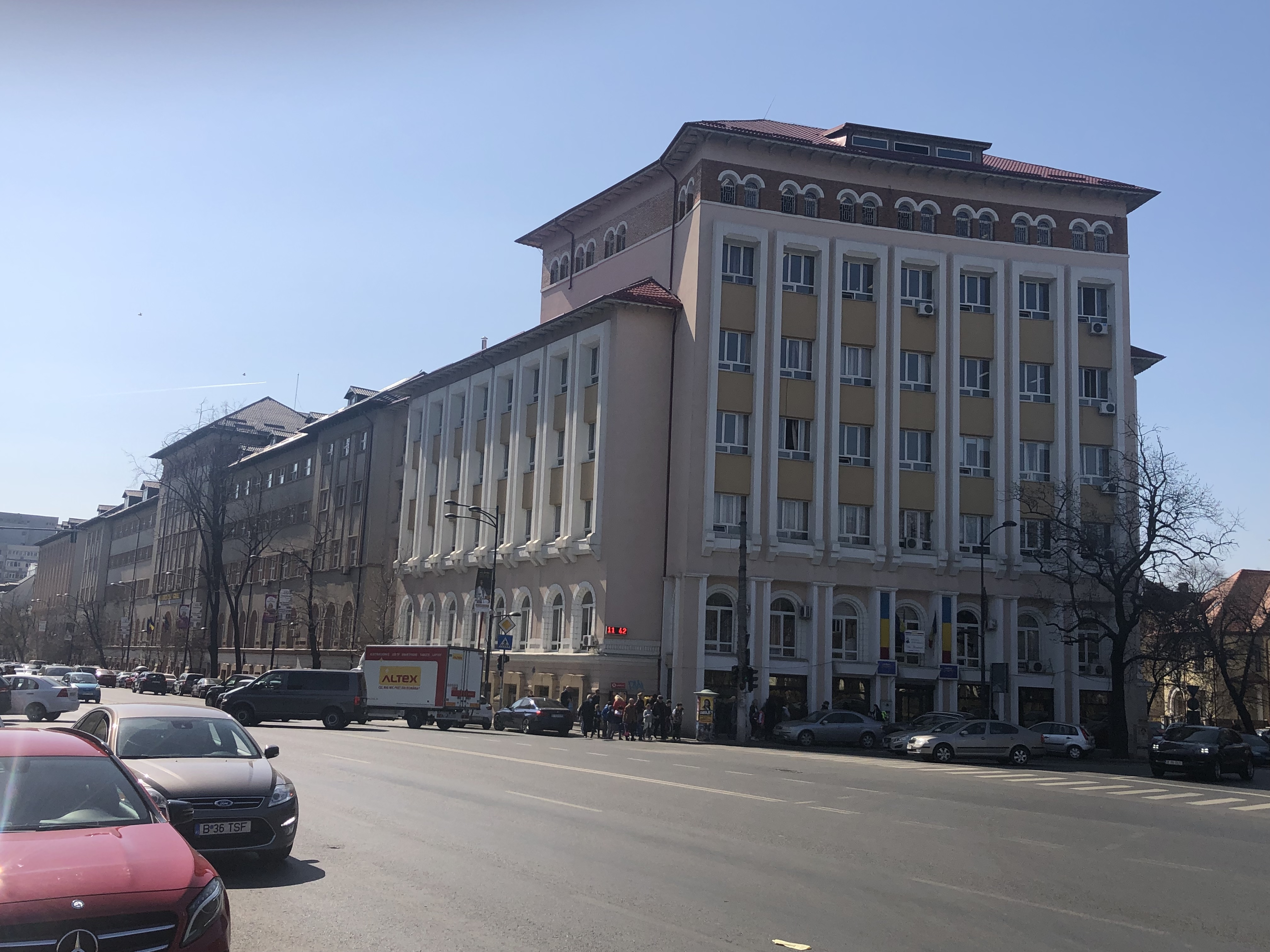
- The high school viewed from Piața Dorobanților

Location
- Calea Dorobanți, Nr. 163, Sector 1 Bucharest; Romania
- 44.45856°N 26.09516°E

Information
- Former names: Titu Maiorescu Boys' High School "I.L. Caragiale" Mixed Secondary School No. 7
- Type: Public
- Established: 1 October 1895; 130 years ago
- Founder: Alexandru Odobescu
- Director: Andreia Bodea
- Grades: 5–12
- Gender: Mixed
- Age range: 11 to 19
- Language: Romanian
- Nickname: Caragiale
- Website: www.cnilcb.ro

Ion Luca Caragiale National College (Romanian: Colegiul Național I. L. Caragiale București) is a high school located at 163 Calea Dorobanți, in the Dorobanți neighborhood of Bucharest, Romania. It bears the name of Ion Luca Caragiale, one of the greatest playwrights and writers in Romanian literature. In 1996, it was granted the title of National College by the Ministry of Education and Research of Romania.

In June 2024, the Caragiale National College was ranked as the most sought after for admission by 8th grade students in Bucharest, ahead of the Gheorghe Lazăr, Iulia Hasdeu, and George Coșbuc colleges; the most sought-after specialization is in mathematics–informatics.

== History ==
The high school was founded on October 1, 1895, as the Application School, at the initiative of Alexandru Odobescu, director of the Școala Normală Superioară. First located at 46 Calea Rahovei, the school was intended for the practical training of future teachers and professors; its first director was Francudi Epaminonda. In 1898, the school was renamed the Application Gymnasium (affiliated with the University Pedagogical Seminary), and its director became Constantin Dimitrescu-Iași, who held this position until 1920, when he was replaced by Ion A. Rădulescu-Pogoneanu. In 1928, the school's name was changed to Titu Maiorescu Boys' High School.

The plot on Calea Dorobanți was purchased in 1921, and the first floor of the present building was completed in January 1929. For a few years, the location was occupied by the Mihai Eminescu High School. Construction resumed in 1933; the second floor was completed in 1943, and the other two in 1947, when the courtyard was also expanded. In 1948, the new communist regime changed the institution's name to Boys' High School No. 7; after merging with the Girls' High School No. 12 in 1948, the school was renamed in 1954 as "I.L. Caragiale" Mixed Secondary School No. 7. In 1974–1977, an addition was built, facing Dorobanți Plaza. From 1978 to 1989, the school functioned as an industrial high school, but after the Romanian Revolution of 1989, it became again a theoretical high school.

== Students ==
The Ion Luca Caragiale National College is an institution of lower secondary (gymnasium) and upper secondary public education. There is a single section (A) for each of grades 5 to 8, and there are 10 sections (A to J) for each of grades 9 to 12:

1. Mathematics–Informatics, intensive informatics
2. Mathematics
3. Mathematics–Informatics, intensive English
4. Mathematics–Informatics, bilingual English
5. Philology
6. Natural Sciences
7. Mathematics–Informatics, bilingual German
8. Social Sciences
9. Philology, bilingual English
10. Philology, bilingual German

In 2024, the admission score into grade 9 was 8.87/10 (9.40–9.60 for Mathematics–Informatics) and the graduation rate was 99.3%. Also that year, 297 students took the Baccalaureate, obtaining an average score of 8.99/10 (ranked 75th nationally). At the 2024 evaluation of all Romanian secondary schools, the Ion Luca Caragiale National College came in 10th place, with a score of 9.46/10.

In April 2025, a team of Caragiale students won the first prize at the international Space Settlement Contest organized by the U.S. National Space Society.

== Facilities ==
The school buildings cover an area of 3,905 m^{2} (42,030 sq ft). This space houses 30 classrooms, 18 IT labs, 12 laboratories, and 2 gyms. There is also a library with 44,000 volumes, a modern reading room, a chapel, a choir room with two pianos, a greenhouse, and a hall for festivities. The outdoor sports base includes 2 basketball courts, a handball court, a 50 m running track, a long jump pit, and endurance running track.

== Principals ==
Name	Term
Francudi Epaminonda	1895–1898
Constantin Dimitrescu-Iași	1898–1920
Ion A. Rădulescu-Pogoneanu	1920–1938
Nicolae Gheorghiu	1938–1945
Mihai Sotiriu	1945–1948
Virgil Atanasiu	1948–1949
George Lăzărescu	1949–1951
Octavia Iacob	1951–1955
Claudia Popeea	1955–1959
Viorica Lecca	1959–1965
Gheorghe Mierlea	1965–1974
Ioana Cosma	1974–1977
Elena Mihai	1977–1989
Doina Ștefănescu	1989–1990
Vasile Ștefănescu	1990–1997
Veronica Focșeneanu	1997–2005
Gabriela Băncilă	2005–2010
Andreia Bodea	2010–

== Notable faculty and alumni ==
=== Faculty ===
- Dumitru Bodin
- Nicolae Cartojan
- Șerban Cioculescu
- Constantin Dimitrescu-Iași
- Mihail Dragomirescu
- Constantin Dimitrescu-Iași
- Constantin Giurescu
- Petre V. Haneș
- Nicolae Lungu
- Simion Mehedinți
- Octav Onicescu
- Dimitrie Pompeiu
- Nicolae Quintescu
- Constantin Rădulescu-Motru
- Ion A. Rădulescu-Pogoneanu
- Lazăr Șăineanu
- Nicolae-Victor Teodorescu
- Grigore Tocilescu
- Gheorghe Țițeica
- Iuliu Valaori

=== Alumni ===
- Radu Bălescu
- Ștefan Bănică Jr.
- Andrei Blaier
- Andrei Brezianu
- Simona Bondoc
- Matei Călinescu
- Andrei Chiliman
- Dorina Chiriac
- Marina Constantinescu
- Daniel Dăianu
- Gil Dobrică
- Maria Dragomiroiu
- Octav Enigărescu
- Andrei Finți
- Lucia Hossu-Longin
- Eugenia Maci
- Bogdan Marinescu
- Irina Movilă
- Virgil Nemoianu
- Oana Niculescu-Mizil
- Sorin Oprescu
- Cornel Oțelea
- Gabriela Pană Dindelegan
- Liviu Papadima
- Dinu Patriciu
- Lucian Pintilie
- Laurențiu Profeta
- Mircea Răceanu
- Vlad Rădescu
- Nicolae N. Săulescu
- Valeria Seciu
- Ilie Șerbănescu
- Bogdan Suceavă
- Cornel Todea
- Ilinca Tomoroveanu
- Adriana-Diana Tușa
- Lidia Vadim-Tudor
- Ion Vitner
- Gelu Voican Voiculescu
