= Rădulescu-Pogoneanu =

Rădulescu-Pogoneanu is the surname of two Romanian individuals:

- Ion A. Rădulescu-Pogoneanu (1870–1945), pedagogue
- Victor Rădulescu-Pogoneanu (1910–1962), Ion's son, diplomat
