= Niculescu-Mizil =

Niculescu-Mizil is the surname of three Romanian politicians:

- Gheorghe Niculescu-Mizil (1886–1945), early socialist and communist militant
- Paul Niculescu-Mizil (1923–2008), Gheorghe's son, Education Minister (1972-1976), Finance Minister (1978–1981), vice premier (1972–1981)
- Oana Niculescu-Mizil (b. 1975), Paul's granddaughter, member of the Chamber of Deputies (2008–2015)
