= G. Dem. Teodorescu =

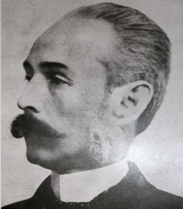
G. Dem. Teodorescu

Gheorghe Dem Teodorescu (25 August 1849 – 20 August 1900) was a Wallachian, later Romanian folklorist, literary historian and journalist.

== Origins, education and early career ==
Born in Bucharest, he was an only son. His father Tudor came from around the Amaradia River in the Oltenia region, and had a construction business; his mother was Sultana. He entered primary school in 1855, later attending Gheorghe Lazăr Gymnasium and Matei Basarab High School from 1859 to 1867. While an adolescent, he began collecting pieces of folklore he heard around him, with examples from both of his parents dated to 1865. In 1868, a few months prior to obtaining his high school degree, he was hired as a civil servant at the Religious Affairs and Education Ministry, meanwhile working on two publications by V. A. Urechia. Near the end of the year, he left government and was hired at Românul newspaper, where he worked as proofreader, reporter, translator (until 1870), editing secretary and contributor (through 1872) and editor (until 1875). He published numerous chronicles, polemics and articles on folklore, literary criticism and history. His first published work on folklore appeared there at Christmas 1869 and New Year's 1870; the two articles were meant to demonstrate the roots of Christmas in Saturnalia. His first book review appeared early in 1870.

In May 1870, he began a regular collaboration with the newspaper Ghimpele, which took a stance against the reigning dynasty. Writing under the cover of the pen name Ghedem, he made somewhat of a name for himself with satiric anti-monarchical poems. During the first half of 1871, he was an editor there, and also briefly edited another satirical anti-royalist gazette, Sarsailă. Later that year, he ventured as Românul's correspondent to Putna Monastery in Austrian-ruled Bukovina, marking 400 years since its foundation. In his memoirs, Ioan Slavici noted the valuable insights recorded by Teodorescu's reportage. Although exempt from military service as the only son of a widow, he joined the militia organized by General Ioan Emanoil Florescu, rising to the rank of sergeant. In 1872, writing for Transacțiuni literare și științifice, he contributed studies on folklore; translations of French romantic poetry and essays on French literature; material on the life and writings of André Chénier, as well as translations of his poetry; translations from Alphonse de Lamartine and Alfred de Musset; and a study on the origin and development of luxury in Rome. In 1874, he published his first book on folklore, Încercări critice asupra unor credințe, datine și moravuri ale poporului român; prefaced by Alexandru Odobescu, it collected his studies on the topic published from 1869 to 1874.

In 1868, he entered the literature and philosophy faculty of the University of Bucharest. Concurrently, he took a declamation course at the Music Conservatory and audited courses on classical philology, graduating these in 1870. August Treboniu Laurian taught the history of Latin literature, while Epaminonda Francudi dealt with Greek. These classes absorbed his intellectual energy and solidified his Latinist beliefs. His planned undergraduate thesis dealt with Greek historiography prior to Herodotus. He also audited courses by Urechia (history of the Romanians and of Romanian literature), Ulysse de Marsillac (history of French literature), Ioan Zalomit (history of philosophy) and Petre Cernătescu (world history). In 1874–1875, the faculty was joined by Odobescu and Bogdan Petriceicu Hasdeu, who offered free courses on, respectively, archaeology and comparative philology. Teodorescu would later find them influential in his work on folklore. However, he did not complete the literature faculty, being sent to France on a state scholarship by Titu Maiorescu, then serving as Education Minister. He left while writing his thesis, and was accompanied by Junimea members Alexandru Lambrior and George Panu. His studies at the University of Paris took place between February 1875 and June 1877, and he obtained a degree in literature upon their completion. His professors included Émile Egger, Georges Perrot, Eugène Benoist, Benjamin-Constant Martha and Numa Denis Fustel de Coulanges. He came into contact with Western folklore studies, from which he adopted a respect for texts and grasped the relationship between Romanian and other folklores. He continued gathering genre texts sent by friends from home, and sent articles to Hasdeu's Columna lui Traian, as well as to Convorbiri Literare.

== Teaching work ==
Upon his return from France, he was hired as substitute teacher at Saint Sava High School, in the Romanian and Latin department of the advanced section; the permanent position had fallen vacant upon the death of I. C. Massim. He was also appointed commander in the Civic Guard, an institution tasked with maintaining public order while the regular army was fighting in the Romanian War of Independence. He held this rank until 1879. Later in 1877, he published Cercetări asupra proverbelor române (Cum trebuiesc culese și publicate), a critical and bibliographic study of Romanian proverbs that expounds his research theory and made him among the first Romanian scholars to understand the close links between philology and folklore. Drawing on his Paris experience, he employed comparative techniques and worked with glossaries by Hungarian, German and British writers that included Romanian proverbs.

In early 1878, his position at Saint Sava became full-time, and turned into a permanent job in 1882. Later in the year, he was hired to teach Romanian language and literature in the upper section of Matei Basarab. He would remain at the school until his death, and became its director in 1885. In May, he joined a mission to Constantinople as secretary to diplomat Dimitrie Brătianu, charged with negotiating in regard to Ottoman prisoners held by the Romanian Army. In 1879, he published Literatura poporană. Noțiuni despre colindele române, a critical commentary focused mainly on Christmas carols, but also on elders' songs and tales. He emphasized the carols' Latin, pagan roots; observed their depiction of customs, their allusions to historical events such as Genoese and Venetian traders' presence on the Black Sea, and their insight into the feudal mindset. His Tratat de versificare latină, which appeared the same year, was the first Romanian-language treatise of Latin prosody; part two, dealing with meter, came out in 1880.

== Poezii populare române ==
In August 1883, while he was taking a mineral bath treatment at Lacu Sărat, he met Petrea Crețu Șolcan, a septuagenarian lăutar from Brăila who would become his chief source of ballads. The following March, he held a conference before the Romanian Athenaeum Society in which he presented Șolcan and his immense knowledge of folklore. He subsequently published his lecture in brochure form, making him the second Romanian to devote a study to a single interpreter (Atanasie Marian Marienescu had done so in 1866), and the first to write about a lăutar. At the same time, he critiqued the folk poetry collection of Vasile Alecsandri, who had felt it incumbent upon him to polish and standardize what he heard from the source. The two met again in Bucharest in May 1884, when Șolcan transmitted further valuable texts. In all, he supplied 137 pieces totaling over 15,000 verses, or nearly a third of Teodorescu's subsequent collection. A year later, Teodorescu was elected a full member of the Athenaeum's literary section; between 1879 and 1899, he held a number of conferences before the society.

Poezii populare române, Teodorescu's magnum opus and the culmination of a two-decade folklore collecting activity, was published in autumn 1885. In the preface, he explains that the texts are arranged according to the age of the people who furnished the material, as well as the age of the traditions represented. A favorable review by Hasdeu and Gheorghe Sion noted the scientific method of collection, the faithful adherence to the texts, the inclusion of variants and the care taken to introduce the texts with notes on the human source, place and date of the collection, as well as the fact that the author supplied footnotes. By the following year, George Ionescu-Gion and Alexandru Dimitrie Xenopol had also penned reviews, while Iacob Negruzzi proposed that the Romanian Academy award Teodorescu an award. Hasdeu objected that he merely deserved a thousand lei: the award, he noted, was for "meaningful intellectual activity", while the money prize went to those who had shown "only a great dose of persistence or material labor".

== Political involvement and Academic Foundation chairmanship ==
As a member of Opoziția Unită, he was elected to his first term in the Assembly of Deputies in by-elections of April 1888; he sat for Ilfov County. That summer, when the faction broke apart, he followed George D. Vernescu into the Liberal-Conservative Party. By November 1895, he was in the National Liberal Party, and joined the party's dissident drapelist splinter group in 1896. In February 1891, when Florescu became Prime Minister during a government crisis, Teodorescu was appointed Education Minister, serving until his resignation in July. Near the end of his term, he was one of the signatories to a law establishing the Carol I Academic Foundation. In the same period, he published Operele lui Anton Pann, a study dealing with the works of Anton Pann, the folklorist active during the first half of the 19th century. The book describes each of Pann's volumes in chronological order, includes available bibliographic information and Pann's own notes, and also reproduces Pann's prefaces to most of the books. In 1893, he published Istoria filosofiei antice. Orientul. Grecii. Creștinii, a survey of classical philosophy from 600 BC to 750 AD. His preface explained its purpose: to facilitate the study of the classics at a time when their adversaries claim learning dead languages is a waste of time, that they can be read in translation and that they are irrelevant to modern society. The book received a prize from the academy in 1894. The 1893 Vieața și activitatea lui Anton Pann was the first biography of Pann, and was praised by Nicolae Iorga. In 1894, in the first number of Ateneul Român magazine, he published "Fata din dafin", the only original tale that appeared during his life. He had heard the story from his mother and written it during his 1878 Turkish trip.

In February 1895, he began a term as the Academic Foundation's first director; his appointment was likely due to his role in drafting and helping secure approval for the law creating the foundation. Working under him was its first librarian, Constantin Rădulescu-Motru. In early 1897, he entered a competition to become professor in the new history of Romanian language and literature department of Bucharest University; he eventually lost to Ovid Densusianu in mid-1898. In October 1898, King Carol I dissolved the post of foundation director, transferring its attributes to the rector of the University of Bucharest. The decision sparked a virulently critical reaction by the press, which saw a political "machination" and "intrigue" by Education Minister Spiru Haret and Prime Minister Dimitrie Sturdza against Teodorescu. Nevertheless, the latter was obligated to hand over the reins to the new rector, Constantin Dimitrescu-Iași.

In 1898, he published a study (Miturile lunare. Vârcolacii. Studiu de etnologie și mitologie comparată.) based on a lecture dealing with werewolves he had delivered a decade earlier. Discussing various cultures, from the Chaldeans and the Assyro-Babylonians, to the Persians, Australian Aborigines, Scandinavians and Palestinians, to the Balkan peoples, the Thracians and the Romanians, he traced the evolution of superstitions into myths and later into customs, especially drawing on a French translation of Edward Burnett Tylor's 1871 Primitive Culture. The same year, he wrote a biography of the late politician Pache Protopopescu.

== Death and legacy ==
Teodorescu died of sepsis at his Bucharest home in August 1900, several days before turning 51, leaving a wife and two young children. The king was informed by telegram; the burial took place at Bellu cemetery. Among the mourners were Education Minister Constantin C. Arion and his deputy, Dimitrie August Laurian. He had a significant number of unpublished manuscripts among his papers. In 1901, a committee was formed to raise funds for a bronze sculpture of Teodorescu; this was completed the following year by Carol Storck and unveiled in the Athenaeum garden. The year 1902 also saw the appearance of a memorial book written by his friends; it included a biography and bibliography, as well as funeral orations by, among others, Constantin Banu and Rădulescu-Motru. In 1939, his daughter Marcella Fotino donated a plaster cast of his sculpture to the Academic Foundation, where it was publicly exposed.

Between 1902 and 1944, critical commentary on Teodorescu amounted only to paragraphs or a few pages in the works of Densusianu, Iorga, Dimitrie Gusti, Grigore Tocilescu, Lazăr Șăineanu, Dumitru Caracostea, Duiliu Zamfirescu and George Călinescu. At the same time, anthologies of folk poetry, collections of folklore and textbooks continued to reproduce texts from his anthology. It was in 1944 that Ovidiu Papadima delivered a lecture on Teodorescu's life and work for Radiodifuziunea Română, subsequently publishing it in Revista Fundațiilor Regale. In 1957, part of his collection was republished as Poezii populare. In 1961, Papadima published the most complete study of Teodorescu to date. In 1968, the twelve tales he had edited during the 1890s and which remained in manuscript form, saw publication as Basme române. In 1974, Ovidiu Bârlea published a study of Romanian folklore, devoting an ample and appreciative chapter to Teodorescu.

Poezii populare române was republished in its entirety in 1982, with footnotes, bibliography, glossary and index, and an introductory monograph by Papadima. The latter analyzed Teodorescu's work as a whole, charted the development of his collection through publication and offered a detailed reconstruction of his research methods. The anthology appeared in a condensed, three-volume mass market edition in 1985. Another edition of the tales appeared in 1996, while a 2005 edition included a glossary and annotations. In 2000, upon the centenary of his death, a new edition of Poezii populare române appeared; the 1982 edition had seen a very small print run and become a collector's item. Istoria limbii și literaturii române. De la începuturi până la 1882, which had remained in manuscript form, was published in 2002; the book provides an overview of the history of the Romanian language and literature, delving into philosophy, folklore, folk costumes and customs, mural painting, woodcarving and architecture.
