= Alexandru Lambrior =

Romanian philologist (1845–1883)

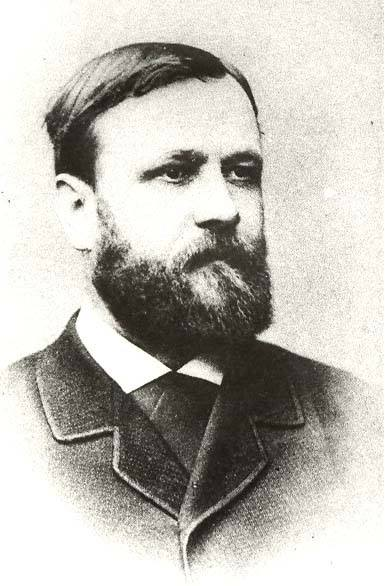
Alexandru Lambrior

Alexandru Lambrior (January 12, 1845^{[a]} – September 20, 1883) was a Romanian philologist and folklorist. A native of Fălticeni in Moldavia, he studied at Iași University and, after beginning a career as a teacher, in Paris. He resumed teaching in 1878, but died of tuberculosis five years later. A pioneer of linguistics in his country, he revered the Romanian of the old medieval chronicles, deploring what he saw as the corrosive effects of neologisms. Lambrior compiled a successful anthology of texts covering some three centuries, and his work on early literature existed alongside an interest in folklore, about which he also proposed original theories.

== Biography ==
Born at Fălticeni in the Principality of Moldavia,^{[a]} his father was Dimitrachi Lambrior; a poor child who was adopted, Dimitrachi's origins are unknown, and his son would later strive to find them out. His mother Marghiolița was the daughter of a low-ranking boyar: her father Vasile Cumpătă was vistiernic (treasury official) who owned a large estate in Soci village. By 1848, Dimitrachi had become a pitar (bread supplier), but he died later that year, and Marghiolița followed in 1850, leaving five-year-old Alexandru and his younger sister orphans; he was subsequently raised by various relatives, first at his grandparents' and then in Flămânzi. In 1852, he began primary school in Târgu Neamț, continued in his native town and completed in Piatra Neamț in 1860. That year, he entered the Iași central gymnasium on a scholarship; he was classmates with George Panu, Calistrat Hogaș and Constantin Dimitrescu-Iași.

After graduating from high school, he enrolled in the literature faculty of Iași University. There, immediately after obtaining his degree, he became a substitute professor in the literature department in 1868, and the following year secured a similar position in the history section. He was later named teacher and principal at A. T. Laurian High School in Botoșani, but was arbitrarily dismissed for political reasons after two years. The May 1871 firing, which involved a number of teachers in several cities and was carried out by Education Minister Cristian Tell, prompted all but two of the faculty at Laurian to resign within two days and sparked ample but ultimately futile protests. In 1872, he became a history teacher at the Iași military school. At the beginning of the same year, he joined Junimea literary society. He delivered several public lectures on various topics, gaining esteem for his intelligence and critical ability. From September 1874 to February 1875, he taught advanced history at the city's National College.

With the support of Junimea leader Titu Maiorescu, he was sent to the University of Paris on a state scholarship early in 1875, together with G. Dem. Teodorescu and Panu, his good friend since high school, who recorded his memories of Lambrior after the latter's death. At the Sorbonne, he audited courses taught by Michel Bréal, Gaston Paris and Arsène Darmesteter. In 1876, Lambrior entered the École des Hautes Études, where he was appreciated by his professors. Starting in 1877, he began publishing a few articles on linguistics in România magazine and was elected a member of the Société de Linguistique de Paris. Already from mid-1876, the National Liberal Education Minister Gheorghe Chițu was threatening to cut off his scholarship, suspecting that Lambrior, who was submitting letters to the rival Conservatives' Timpul, was more interested in politics than in his studies. Pressure mounted when Teodorescu returned with a Sorbonne degree in 1877, but Lambrior explained his own school did not grant such diplomas. Chițu responded that the Romanian government did not recognize the École's certificates, and cut off the scholarship in January 1878.

Lambrior returned to Iași that June, taking up his former post at the National College. In order to support his family, he also taught at several private schools. He was close friends with Mihail Eminescu and Ion Creangă, and continued publishing in Convorbiri Literare, the Junimea organ where he had made his published debut in 1873. In 1879, he began offering an open course on Romanian philology at the university. In 1882, he was named a teacher at the upper normal school; the same year, he was elected a corresponding member of the Romanian Academy.

Toward the end of 1882, Lambrior became increasingly ill with tuberculosis; he began to miss classes that some of his students held in his stead. In November, Creangă lamented his friend's state, ascribing it to overwork. He clung desperately to life, perturbed by thoughts for his family: in 1869, he had married Maria, the daughter of Huși Major Manolache Cișman, and the couple had three sons aged seven to twelve. He knew what it meant to be an orphan and that they had no means of support. With his friend Grigore Tocilescu, he planned a trip to Italy. In March 1883, he began to feel better; in June, he was at a villa outside Iași, and he spent July and August near Văratec Monastery. Subsequently, he planned a trip to Bucharest to see Tocilescu, but began violently vomiting blood at the Iași railway station. In September, he resumed the idea of going to Italy, where he planned to study the Neapolitan language as part of his research into Romanian. In his final letter, written to Grigore Crețu four days before his death, he wrote about the trip and commented on the latest philological publications. One of his sons became a doctor at Sfântul Spiridon Hospital in Iași, a second worked as a magistrate in Tecuci and the third was a teacher and primary school inspector in Bacău.

== Contributions ==
Carte de citire (1890 edition)

As a philologist, Lambrior made a name for himself in 1873, when he published a study about old and modern Romanian, which became a representative text for Junimea's approach to language issues. The article revolved around the Romanian translation of four philosophical volumes by Johan Gabriel Oxenstierna, which appeared in Moldavia between 1781 and 1807. While praising the translators for the accuracy of their expression, he deplored their avoidance of older words in favor of newer terms, which he felt could never be in harmony with the rest of the language.

Starting from a linguistic positivism that was essentially Neogrammarian, he was interested in discovering phonetic, morphological and syntactical rules of Romanian. He was aided by his knowledge of the language's history and of its dialects, and chose to integrate his study not in the context of the Balkan languages, as had heretofore generally been done, but of the Romance languages. He vigorously defended the language as spoken by the common people, and deplored any sort of neologisms, which he considered damaging for the language's spirit and its national character. An 1874 article reiterated some of the ideas found in his previous article, showing his preference for the language of the old chronicles, which he believed was not beholden to foreign rhetorical influences or to a conscious desire for artistry, but nevertheless had its own special rhythm. He cited the work of Miron Costin as an example.

As for the written language, he appreciated its expressive force and evocative quality, which he believed belonged only to the received language and not neologisms. He recommended that the literary language be enriched by borrowing from living folk expressions, and praised authors who chose this style. At the same time, he scorned more innovative artists: "the most wretched of all poets and writers are those who use neologisms without the possibility of their contributing to any literary fount". In a lengthy 1881 study, he was among the first Romanian scholars to suggest that the language was written down before 1500, also proposing that Latin letters were used prior to the adoption of the Romanian Cyrillic alphabet. His ideas were later taken up by Alexandru Dimitrie Xenopol and Alexandru Rosetti. The same article, starting from an analysis of the Cyrillic writing, argued in favor of a phonetic system of orthography.

In 1880–1881, he was among the first philologists to argue that Coresi played a leading role in the literary language's development, and that the first translations of religious texts in Transylvania "extinguished" local written dialects in the other Romanian provinces of Moldavia and Wallachia. Later philologists such as Nicolae Iorga, Ovid Densusianu, Rosetti and Petre P. Panaitescu embraced the idea, which was only given a critical re-evaluation by Ion Gheție in the 1980s. In line with his principles and with the Junimist notion of a patriotic education, he published Carte de citire, an anthology of old Romanian texts, in 1882. This was his magnum opus, posthumously republished twice. The third such collection, after those of Timotei Cipariu and Bogdan Petriceicu Hasdeu, it includes a preface where the author mentions his didactic as well as aesthetic scope, opining that "the true Romanian language" is best learned by "reading and re-reading well-written fragments". The introduction includes a history of the language, an analysis of its phonetic and morphological characteristics using old examples, and a review of Cyrillic writing. The texts, arranged chronologically and by genre, date from the 16th to the early 19th century and, with one exception, are reproduced in this alphabet. Based on the extent of contemporary knowledge, they are dated and localized, and preceded by brief commentaries.

He was greatly interested in popular history and traditions, incorporating literary folklore into a wider context. Lambrior believed folklore was of documentary value in studying history as well as the language. He thus recommended that folklore be collected directly from villagers, and decried anthologies put together by scholarly Latinists. He was the first Romanian folklorist to argue in favor of assembling a corpus of folk literature by recording all variants and types in their authentic form, with the goal of precisely understanding the people's ideas, beliefs, spirit and literary inclinations. In many areas a pioneer, the judgment of George Călinescu became increasingly valid as the 20th century progressed: "his small number of philological publications is remembered with veneration, but never consulted."

Lambrior also asserted that in previous centuries, there had been a commonality of traditions between boyars and peasants. He believed that his own century had witnessed the uprooting of the first and the exposure of the second to increasing influence by the educated class, threatening the production and transmission of folklore. This was the explanation he offered for the disappearance of certain forms, such as the ballad. Additionally, in 1875 he was the first to claim that the Romanian epic began in the early medieval courts. He suggested that the genre was initially sung at gatherings of the elite and that for the Romanian nobility of the period, it represented the highest form of verbal art. His theories were embraced and developed by later generations of folklorists, including Iorga and Panaitescu.

== Footnotes ==
Based on his obituary, Lambrior's birthdate was long accepted as September 10, 1846, but later research corrected this error. His birthplace is sometimes erroneously given as Soci village because his grandparents' home was located there. (Chițimia, p. 217; Lambrior, p. vi)
