= Bogdan Marinescu =

Romanian physician and politician (1944–2026)

Member of the Senate of Romania
- In office 1996–2000

Member of the Chamber of Deputies
- In office 1992–1996

Minister of Health
- In office 28 June 1990 – 16 October 1991

Personal details
- Born: 29 November 1944
- Died: 18 June 2026 (aged 81)
- Party: Democratic Liberal Party

Bogdan Marinescu (29 November 1944 – 18 June 2026) was a Romanian physician and politician.

Marinescu attended the Ion Luca Caragiale High School in Bucharest. He was a deputy in the 1992–1996 legislature and a senator in the 1996–2000 legislature in the Romanian Parliament from the Bucharest Democratic Liberal Party (PD).

He held the position of director at the Prof. Dr. Panait Sârbu Obstetrics and Gynecology Clinical Hospital from 1983 to 2010. Marinescu was a doctor in the Obstetrics – Gynecology II – Couple Infertility department at Panait Sârbu.

Marinescu died on 18 June 2026, at the age of 81.
