= Nicolae N. Săulescu =

Romanian agronomist

Nicolae N. Săulescu (born April 15, 1939) is a Romanian agronomist and geneticist. In 2009, he was elected a titular member of the Romanian Academy.

He was born in Bucharest, the son of Nicolae A. Săulescu, also an agronomist and an academic. He attended the city's Ion Luca Caragiale High School, graduating in 1957, after which he studied at the University of Agronomic Sciences and Veterinary Medicine of Bucharest, obtaining his agricultural engineering diploma in 1961. After further studies in Krasnodar (with P.P. Lukyanenko) and Mexico (with Norman Borlaug), he obtained his Ph.D. in 1971 from his alma mater, with thesis Contributions to specifying the breeding methodology for increasing the production capacity of winter wheat.

Săulescu became a professor at the University of Agronomic Sciences and Veterinary Medicine. He was elected corresponding member of the Romanian Academy in 1990, and titular member in 2009.
