= Radu Bălescu =

Romanian physicist (1932–2006)

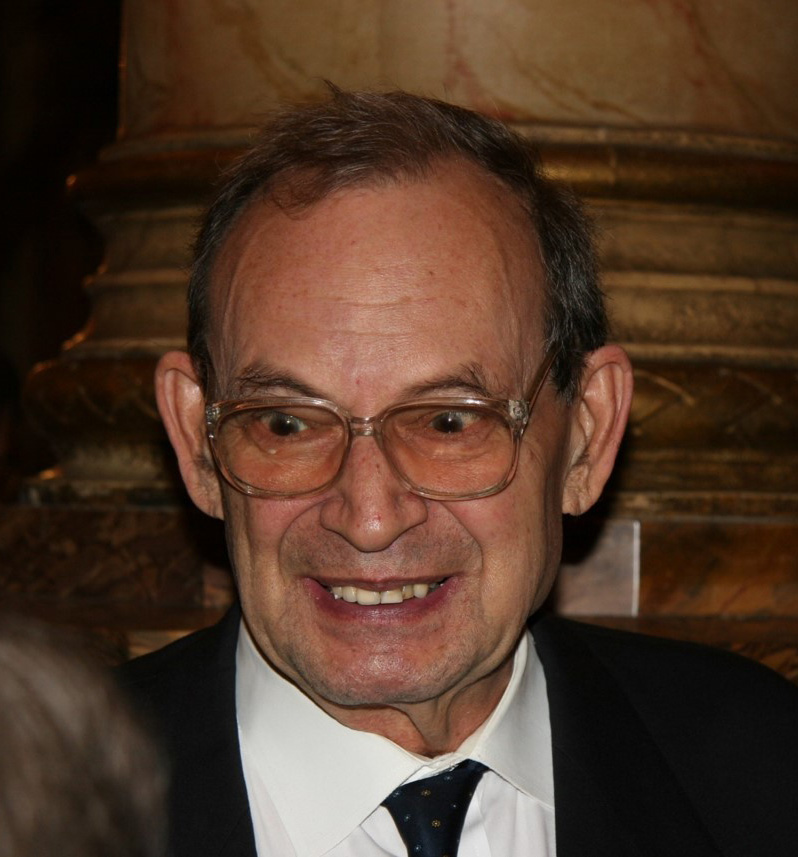

Radu Bălescu (Bucharest, 18 July 1932 – 1 June 2006, Bucharest) was a Romanian and Belgian (from 1959) scientist and professor at the Statistical and Plasma Physics group of the Université libre de Bruxelles (ULB).

He studied at the Titu Maiorescu High School in Bucharest (1943–1948) and the Athénée Royal d'Ixelles (1948–1950). At the ULB (1950–1958) he studied chemistry and obtained a PhD in 1958. He started his academic career in 1957 at the ULB as an assistant (with Prof. Ilya Prigogine) at the Service de Physique Théorique et Mathématique. He became a professor at the ULB in 1964. He worked on the statistical physics of charged particles (Bălescu-Lenard collision operator) and on the theory of transport of magnetically confined plasmas. Radu Balescu was involved in the European fusion programme for more than 30 years as a scientist and as the head of research unit of the ULB group in the Euratom-Belgian state Association.

In 1970 he was awarded the Francqui Prize on Exact Sciences. In 2000 he received the Hannes Alfvén Prize.

== See also ==
- EURATOM

== Journal ==
- Belyi, V. V.; Kukharenko, Yu. A.; Wallenborn, J. (6 May 1996). "Pair Correlation Function and Nonlinear Kinetic Equation for a Spatially Uniform Polarizable Nonideal Plasma". Physical Review Letters. 76 (19). American Physical Society (APS): 3554–3557. doi:10.1103/physrevlett.76.3554. ISSN 0031-9007.
