= Petre V. Haneș =

Romanian literary historian (1879–1966)

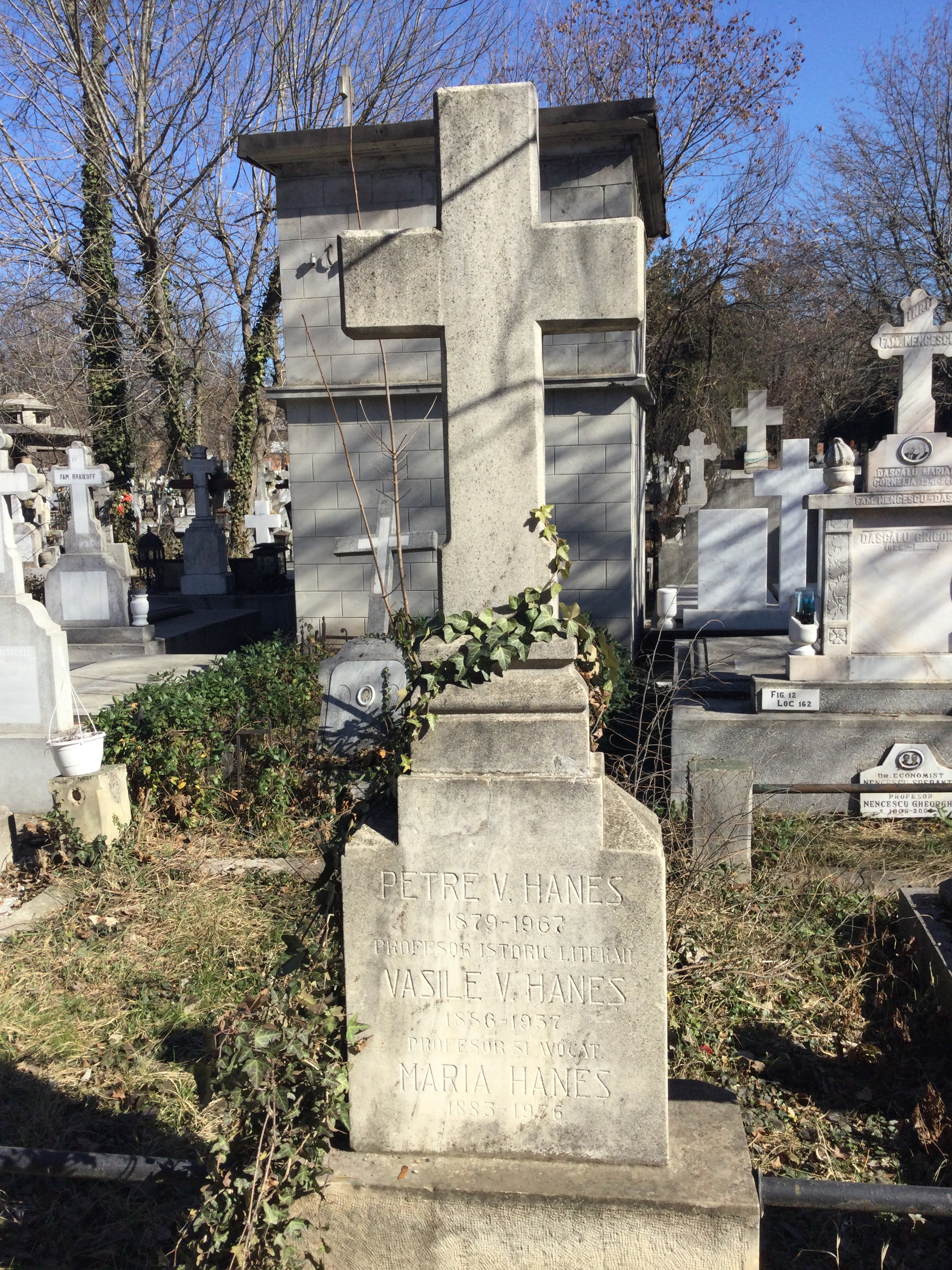
Grave at Sfânta Vineri Cemetery

Petre V. Haneș (November 6, 1879–April 17, 1966) was a Romanian literary historian.

Born in Călărași, his parents were Vasile Haneș and his wife Maria (née Leca). He attended Matei Basarab High School in Bucharest, followed by the literature faculty of the University of Bucharest. Later, in 1920, he received a doctorate from the same institution. After university, Haneș became a Romanian-language teacher at three schools in the capital city: Matei Basarab, Mihai Viteazul High School, and the pedagogical seminary. He offered free courses at the literature faculty as well. Within the educational system, he served as school inspector and was a permanent member of the Public Instruction Ministry's council, serving as secretary general in 1920.

Haneș' first publication appeared in 1900 in Noua revistă română. The author of studies on literary history, his work ran in Revista universitară (1900), Viața nouă, Convorbiri Literare, Preocupări literare (where he was director from 1936 to 1938), Biserica ortodoxă română and Limbă și literatură. In 1926, he founded a society for the friends of literary history. Late in life, he was active in the society of philological sciences. He published volumes featuring the works of Alecu Russo, Nicolae Bălcescu, Grigore Alexandrescu, Mihail Kogălniceanu, and Dinicu Golescu.

Haneș was a conscientious and honest researcher who devoted equal attention to the various periods of Romanian literature. His books included Cântarea României, 1900; Alexandru Russo, 1901; Dezvoltarea limbii române în prima jumătate a sec. al XIX-lea, 1904; Studii de literatură română, 1910; Evangheliarul românesc din 1561 în conparațiune cu cel slavonesc, 1913; Un călător englez despre români, 1920; Scriitori basarabeni, 1920; Studii literare, 1925; Studii și cercetări, 1927; Istoria literară în călătorii, 1933; Genuri literare, 1934; Scriitori basarabeni. 1850-1940, 1942; and Vechile noastre cazanii: Coresi, Varlaam, Mânăstirea Dealu, 1943. He also wrote a general history of the field, Istoria literaturii românești; published in 1924, it also appeared in French in 1934.

He died in 1966 in Bucharest and was buried in the city's Sfânta Vineri Cemetery.
