= George Panu =

Moldavian, later Romanian memoirist, literary critic, journalist and politician

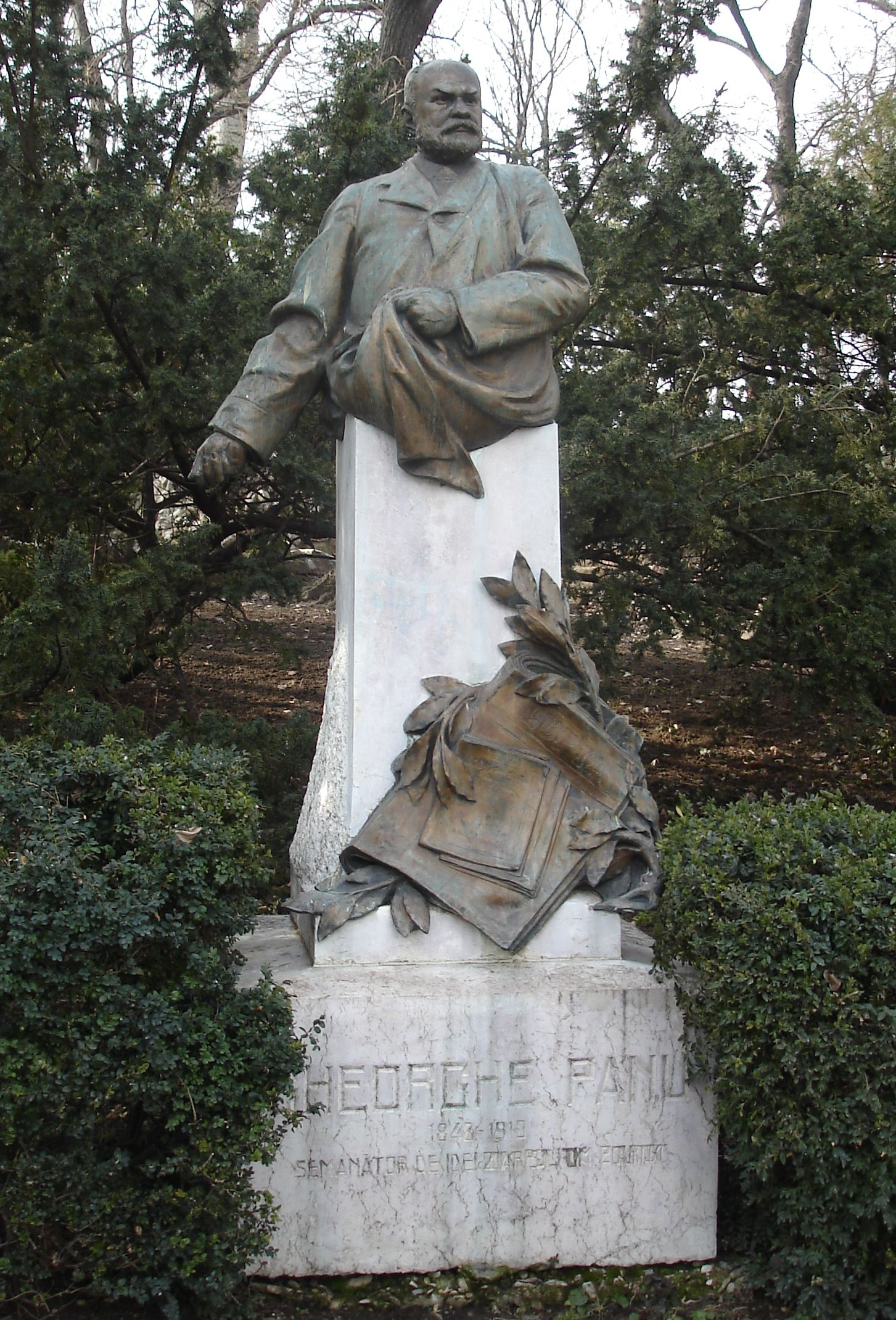
Bust of George Panu in Cișmigiu Gardens

George Panu (March 9, 1848 – November 6, 1910) was a Moldavian, later Romanian memoirist, literary critic, journalist and politician. A native of Iași, educated there as well as in Paris and Brussels, he worked as a schoolteacher and lawyer, but made a name for himself in politics and journalism. His outlook was a radical one that shared common goals with the socialist movement. Noted for his bitter polemics, he served several terms in parliament, alternating between the main parties as well as heading his own small faction for nearly a decade. In the last years of his life, Panu wrote a valuable memoir detailing his experiences in the Junimea literary society, of which he had become an implacable adversary.

== Biography ==
=== Origins and education ===
Born in Iași, his parents were the army officer Vasile Panu and his wife Ana (née Gugora), who was of Bulgarian origin. Vasile, whose family originated in Vaslui and was reportedly called Brânză, attended a cadets' school in Odessa and rose to the rank of major. He married Ana in Galați; the couple had four sons and two daughters. George attended primary school at Trei Ierarhi Monastery, followed by the National College. His teachers included Petru Poni, Bogdan Petriceicu Hasdeu and Titu Maiorescu, while he was classmates with Alexandru Lambrior and Vasile Conta. He was passionate about history and read well beyond what was expected, and was a devoted admirer of Simion Bărnuțiu, whose ascetic figure he saw several times while the latter was teaching in Iași. From the early days of Junimea literary society, in 1864, he began hearing its lectures. When Alexandru Ioan Cuza was overthrown in 1866, he and other pupils backed the idea of a native prince to reign over the country, rather than the foreign-born one Junimea backed, and eventually personified by Carol I. He subsequently studied at the Literature faculty of Iași University from 1868 to 1870. His professors included Maiorescu, Iacob Negruzzi, Nicolae Ionescu and Gheorghe Mârzescu, and he read widely. Panu's classmates included Lambrior and Calistrat Hogaș, who had also gone to high school with him.

For some years beginning in 1869, he taught French at a gymnasium in his native city. Around this time, he was anti-Junimist in orientation, which furthered his career, as the city administration was controlled by the same ideological current, and was drawn to the ideas of Hippolyte Taine. From 1872 to 1874, he was a regular attendee at meetings of Junimea, inducted into the society on the initiative of several friends, among them Lambrior and Alexandru Dimitrie Xenopol. His first article in its journal Convorbiri Literare appeared in 1872, and he held his maiden lecture before fellow Junimists the same year. In 1873, he published a study that pointed out minor errors by Hasdeu, who enlisted Grigore Tocilescu in his defense, giving rise to acid exchanges between him and Panu. An admirer of Petrarch, he translated three sonnets that appeared in Convorbiri the same year; he was interested in demonstrating that the concerns of contemporary lyric poetry, particularly in Romania, had been addressed centuries earlier.

In late 1874, he arrived in Paris on a scholarship that he obtained thanks to Maiorescu, at that time Education Minister. He was accompanied by Lambrior, Tocilescu and another Hasdeu affiliate, G. Dem. Teodorescu. At the University of Paris, he took courses in Latin and Greek, but was unhappy with the French educational system, with its emphasis on passive acceptance of classical dogmas. In 1875, he befriended the sons of C. A. Rosetti, through whom he met their father. The following year, when Maiorescu left the ministry, he rushed to Bucharest, where Rosetti assured him his scholarship was safe. He shifted from classics to sociology, and in 1878 to law. In 1879, he obtained a doctorate in law from the Free University of Brussels. That year, Rosetti's son Mircea introduced him to socialist circles in France and Belgium, prior to his return home. With regard to the Romanian Jews, Panu noted that every Junimea member, Petre P. Carp excepted, was an anti-Semite. His own hostility toward Jews, he later acknowledged, was shaped by the political climate in which he grew up; Iași had a strong Jewish minority that was seen as a religious, economic and social danger to ethnic Romanians. It was only while studying in Paris that he dropped his previous attitude and adopted the humanistic ideas about the Jews then circulating in the West.

=== Political and journalistic career ===
Sufragiul universal, an 1893 work advocating for universal suffrage

Working as a lawyer, he became a magistrate in 1881, when he pleaded on behalf of socialists on trial for incidents that occurred during the 10-year celebrations of the Paris Commune. He also pursued a political career, becoming cabinet chief to Interior Minister Rosetti in 1880. His final break with Junimea came in 1881, when he objected to the publication of a passage in Mihai Eminescu's Scrisoarea a III-a that denigrated Rosetti; he quit when publication went ahead. As revenge, both Maiorescu and Negruzzi gave unfair depictions of Panu in their writings, characterizing him as an ungrateful endlessly adaptable chameleon. It was only in 1943 that Eugen Lovinescu supplied a more balanced view of the man, placing him within the context of his period.

He alternated between the Liberal (PNL) and Conservative (PC) parties in a vain search for the right conditions within which to achieve his democratic ideals. Along with other radicals of the period, his alternation was not due primarily to opportunism, but because the king recognized only the two main parties as legitimately able to form a government, and smaller parties were denied an effective role in public life. Although he frequently clashed with their leadership and despised their way of doing business, he hoped that by working from within, he would be able to secure at least some of his objectives. It is in this context that the militant of the 1880s moved to the Conservatives in the 1890s while preserving his core convictions. Additionally, he was unable to join the Liberals at that point because he believed they were too compromised by their long years in power, and had himself helped to overthrow them.

First elected to the Assembly of Deputies in 1883, he belonged to the dissident Rosetti-led Liberal faction, opposed to the dominant Ion C. Brătianu group. In 1884, Rosetti's deputies resigned from parliament, formalizing the split in the party. He sympathized with the socialist movement and was among the main founders of the Radical Party, set up by Rosetti after leaving the PNL. He became party leader after the latter's death in 1885. In 1884, he founded the party newspaper Lupta, remaining editor until 1892 and turning it into one of the era's most important pro-democracy papers. Additionally, he headed Ziua newspaper in 1896 and wrote Săptămâna magazine by himself from 1901 to 1910, from the politics section to the theater reviews. His contributions also appeared in Liberalul, Epoca, Epoca literară, L’Indépendence Roumaine and Fântâna Blanduziei, earning Panu the reputation of a talented journalist with a gift for logical argumentation and incisive observation. He was a feared polemicist, as exemplified by the 1893 Portrete și tipuri parlamentare. This book described numerous contemporary members of parliament with a mixture of lively dialogue, picturesque detail, essential character traits encapsulated within a few lines, a keen eye for humor and a flair for the dramatic.

In 1887, he published Omul periculos, a pamphlet attacking the regnant House of Hohenzollern, accusing the king of abusing his prerogatives and allowing his ministers to ignore the constitution while suggesting he abdicate. Sued for lèse-majesté, he was sentenced to two years' imprisonment and a fine of 5000 lei. After writing an article to explain he was not fleeing but going into exile, he left for Vienna in May and was returned in absentia to the Assembly the following January, as an opposition member. In February, he was arrested but soon released, having gained parliamentary immunity. A government crisis was going on at the same time, and Panu, both in parliament and in Lupta, bitterly attacked the new government of Theodor Rosetti and the continued influence of Junimea. Later that year, he put forth a program for his party, which touched on subjects such as the peasantry, industrial development, relations between owners and workers, social insurance and universal suffrage. He shared these objectives with the socialists, along with an anti-dynastic outlook and calls for an eight-hour workday and Sundays off. However, his Radicals began to diverge from the socialists during the 1888 crisis: while the former took an active role both in parliament and in the streets, the latter kept its distance in the belief that the situation did not concern them.

In early 1892, having impressed the voters with his performance during his second term as deputy, Panu was elected to the Senate. Over the following year, Panu moved away from the Radicals while clarifying his differences with the socialists, and in 1895 formally joined the Conservatives, whose Junimea faction was in dissidence. That same autumn, however, he lost his Senate seat. He restored his morale by remarrying and by spending time in his residence at the Durău resort with friends who included Barbu Ștefănescu Delavrancea, Ion Luca Caragiale, Vasile Morțun, Constantin Istrati, Alexandru Bădărău and Ioan Bacalbașa. In 1897, he became part of the party leadership while editing its newspaper, Epoca. The following March, he was returned to the Senate on the PC's list, representing Galați. Also that year, he blocked an attempt to merge the main conservative organization with the Carp-led Junimist grouping, earning him undying hostility, even hatred, from the latter. In 1899, Lascăr Catargiu died the very day he was named prime minister, denying Panu his only chance to enter the cabinet. At the same time, the king objected, recalling Panu's 1887 escapade: "a man who dodges his country's laws cannot be a minister". The monarch's solution was to name two successive cabinets, led by Gheorghe Grigore Cantacuzino and Carp respectively. By the time the Carp government fell in early 1901 (an act to which Panu contributed), the PC was deeply split between what Panu saw as the "Cantacuzino continent", the "Carp peninsula" and a little island which could only fit him, "a political Robinson". In 1901, with Junimea back inside the PC, he quit the party, joining the PNL and being elected deputy thanks to new prime minister Dimitrie Sturdza, although Panu formally sat as an independent.

=== Final years and legacy ===
By this time, Panu was beset by accumulated disappointments, his former enthusiasm diminished, tired of wandering between parties and eventually stricken with an incurable illness. However, he did not remain a mere spectator or, as he said of himself in 1907, a politically defeated man, but a careful observer and active commentator, less in parliament than in the pages of Săptămâna. There, beginning in 1901, he began serializing his memoirs of the Junimea days, completing the account five years later. His place in literary history is especially due to the book form of these writings, Amintiri de la "Junimea" din Iași (vol. I, 1908; vol. II, 1910), perhaps the most forthright account of the society's central figures. Focusing on the 1872-1875 period, the author is guilty of omissions and particularly of adding imagined scenes. But what distinguishes it from the pedantic, dry accounts of Negruzzi and Ioan Slavici is the ability to recreate the spirit of Junimea, to render not only the solemn image its leaders presented to the outside world, but also the internal bustle, the behind-the-scenes intrigue and the relaxed, Bohemian mood that made up its charm. Ironically, the chief memoir on the subject ended up being written by a deserter from the society who emerged as a bitter adversary. The book remained a principal source for research into Junimea until 1933, when I. E. Torouțiu published Xenopol's minutes of its meetings.

Panu expressed a reserved attitude toward the 1907 peasants' revolt and did not approve of it. He died in Bucharest, and was eulogized by Garabet Ibrăileanu in hallowed terms in the pages of Viața Românească: "with a proud awkwardness, with the admirable and manly ugliness of a robust person, with those eyes that watched with a sort of painful hatred, with his clipped tones and voice hoarse from passion, G. Panu approached the podium as if from amidst the oppressed and those living in the shadows, as an avenger of theirs".

Panu married Ecaterina Caranfil in 1869; they ended up divorcing. His second wife was the much younger Maria Clain, who died in 1945, and the couple's daughter Anica was born in 1896. There is a bronze statue of Panu in Cișmigiu Gardens titled Gheorghe Panu, semănătorul de idei. Dating to 1912, it is the work of Gheorghe Horvath, and was financed through a public subscription sponsored by Adevărul. The sculpture is listed as a historic monument by Romania's Ministry of Culture and Religious Affairs.
