= Ion Vitner =

Romanian literary critic, historian and professor

Ion Vitner (August 19, 1914 – April 12, 1991) was a Romanian literary critic and historian.

Born into a Jewish family in Bucharest, his parents were Leon Vitner, a clerk, and his wife Gisela (née Zoller). He attended Poenărescu primary school in his native city from 1921 to 1925, followed by its Titu Maiorescu High School from 1925 to 1932 and the University of Bucharest's medical faculty between 1933 and 1939. He obtained a doctorate in medicine in 1940, and one in philology from the same institution in 1971. His work was first published in 1931 in unu. From 1933 to 1935, he took part in the Marxist study circle affiliated with Cuvântul Liber magazine, to which he submitted work under the name Ion Vântu. Due to his leftist political activities, he was placed under house arrest in 1940; in 1942, he was deported to Transnistria Governorate. Between 1944 and 1946, he was an editor at the Romanian Communist Party daily Scînteia, and helped edit Orizont magazine between 1944 and 1947. He was assistant editor-in-chief, followed by editor-in-chief, at Contemporanul between 1946 and 1949, and editor-in-chief at Flacăra from 1949 to 1950, early in the communist regime. He also submitted work to Gazeta literară, Tribuna and Viața Românească. Between 1948 and 1960, he was in the leadership committee of the Romanian Writers' Union. From 1949 and 1970, he was a professor at Bucharest's Romanian language and literature faculty, where he took the post previously held by George Călinescu.

His books include volumes of essays (Pasiunea lui Pavel Corceaghin, 1949; Critica criticii, 1950; Firul Ariadnei, 1957; Meridiane literare, 1960; Prozatori contemporani, vol. I-II, 1961–1962; Formarea conceptului de literatură socialistă, 1966; Albert Camus sau tragicul exilului, 1968; Semnele romanului, 1971; Al. Ivasiuc – în fruntarea contrariilor, 1980) as well as travel accounts (Reverii pe malurile Senei, 1978; Popas lângă Notre-Dame, 1981). He was awarded the State Prize in 1949 and 1955 and the Romanian Academy Prize in 1954.
