= National College (Iași) =

High school in Iași, Romania

Coordinates: 47.1665°N 27.5783°E

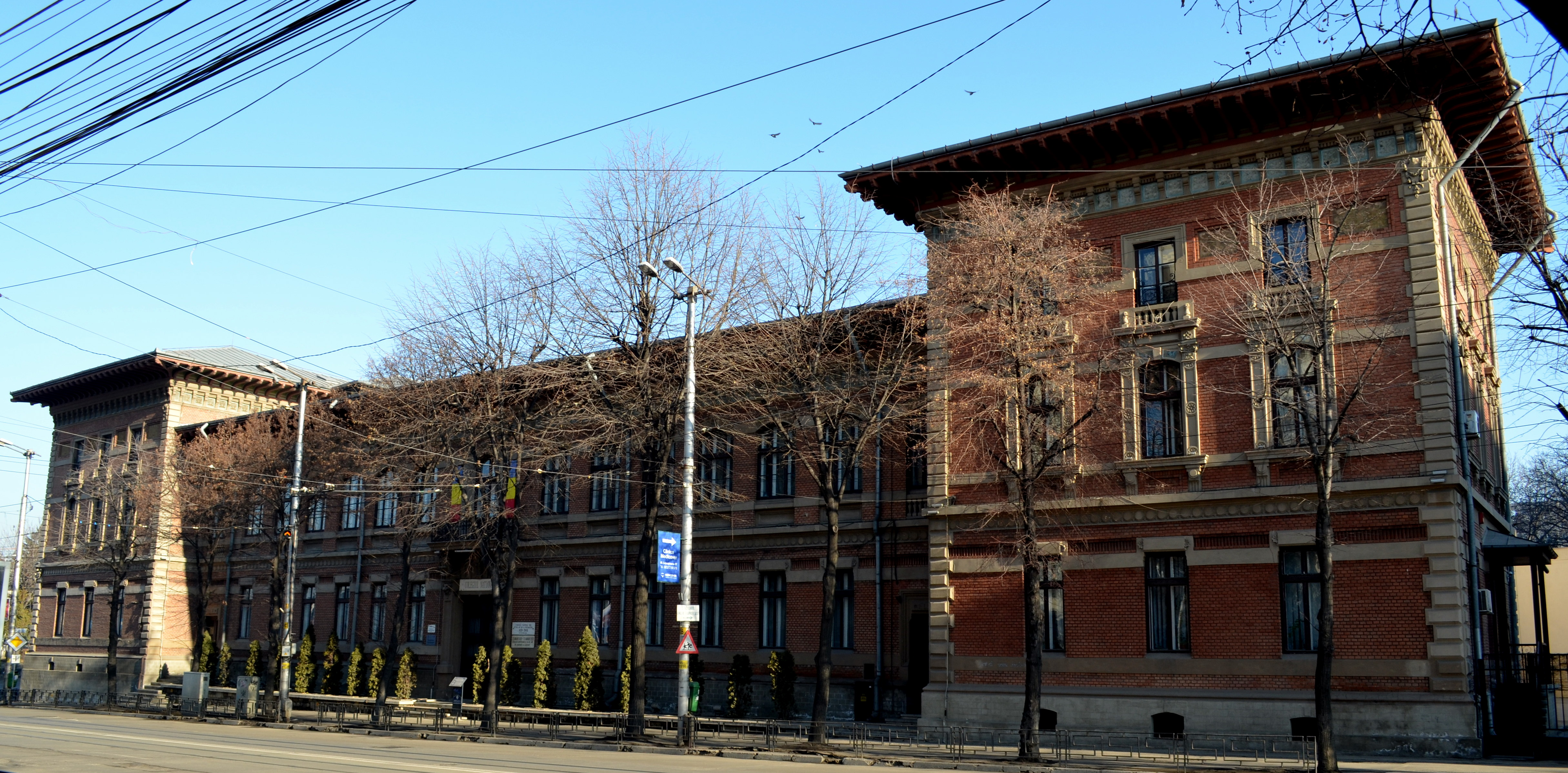
National College

The National College (Romanian: Colegiul Național) is one of the oldest and most prestigious high schools in Romania, located in Iași, at 4 Arcu Street.

== History ==
The school traces its origins to two earlier institutions, the Vasilian College and Academia Mihăileană. In 1860, when the latter's higher education role was taken over by the new University of Iași, it continued as the National College, a high school with seven grades. In 1864, it was renamed the National High School; reflecting its early commitment to the Romanian language, it was the country's first school to feature the term “national” in its name. The new and current building, designed by Nicolae Gabrielescu, dates to 1890–1894. The student magazine Spre lumină first appeared in 1903. In 1916–1918, during World War I, the building was used as a Red Cross hospital.

After the war, the students founded a radio station and, in 1923, a cinema. During the same period, the school had its own orchestra, a uniform and military training. A dormitory for rural students opened in 1922; some 30 boys lived there free of charge, but were required to wear traditional dress. A permanent dormitory building was inaugurated in 1926. A new school flag was adopted that year, replacing one from 1828. In March 1944, during the Uman–Botoșani offensive of World War II, students and faculty were evacuated to Făget in the Banat, returning one year later.

In 1948, after the onset of the communist regime, the school underwent various name changes, ultimately settling on Mihail Sadoveanu. In 1978, on the 150th anniversary of Romanian-language education in Moldavia, the National High School name was restored. The buildings were rehabilitated between 1993 and 2003; meanwhile, it was declared a national college in 1998.

The 1894 school building is listed as a historic monument by Romania's Ministry of Culture and Religious Affairs.

== Faculty and alumni ==
=== Alumni ===
- Alexandru Bădărău
- George Bogdan
- Octav Botez
- Gheorghe I. Brătianu
- Alexandru Cazaban
- Vasile Conta
- Ovid Densusianu
- Emil Fagure
- Benjamin Fondane
- Calistrat Hogaș
- Victor Iamandi
- Nicolae Iorga
- Nicolae Labiș
- Petre Liciu
- Gheorghe Macovei
- Petru Th. Missir
- Ilie Moscovici
- George Panu
- Dimitrie D. Pătrășcanu
- Grigore T. Popa
- Mihail Sadoveanu
- Gheorghe Spacu
- Corneliu Șumuleanu
- Ionel Teodoreanu
- Constantin C. Teodorescu

=== Faculty ===
- Petre Andrei
- Traian Bratu
- Vasile Burlă
- Alexandru Lambrior
- Titu Maiorescu
- Alexandru Piru
- Heimann Hariton Tiktin
