= Pogoanele =

- Town
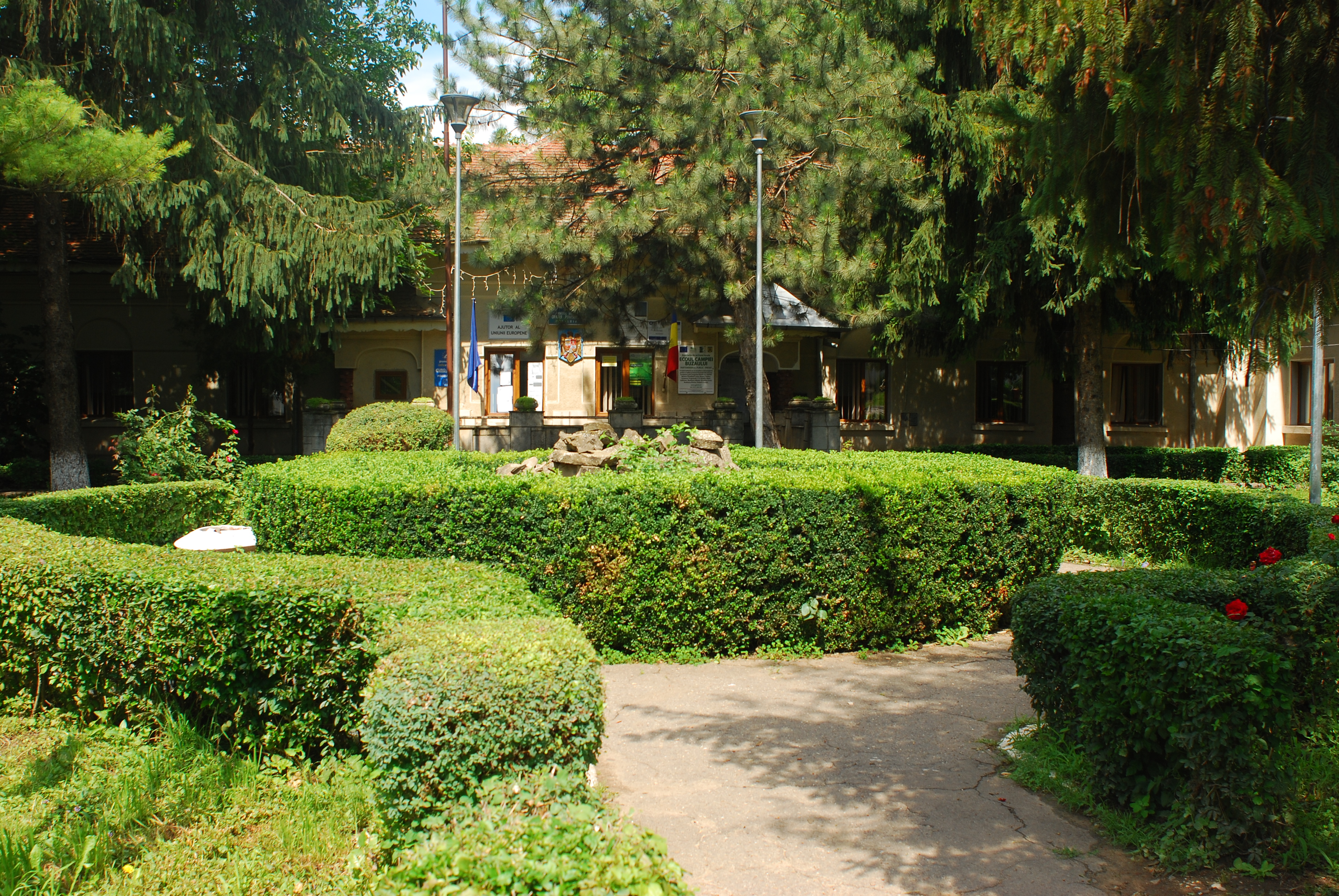
- Pogoanele Town Hall

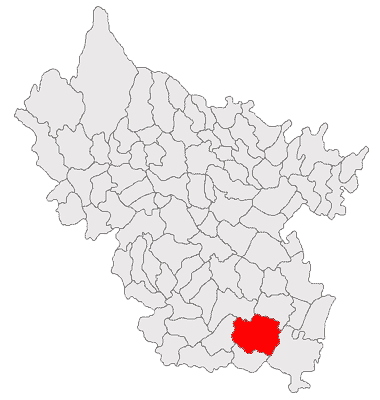
- Location in Buzău County

- Location in Romania
- Coordinates: 44°55′N 27°0′E
- Country: Romania
- County: Buzău

Government
  - Mayor (2024–2028): Florin Dumitrașcu (PSD)
- Area: 122 km^{2} (47 sq mi)
- Elevation: 63 m (207 ft)
- Population (2021-12-01): 6,384
  - Density: 52.3/km^{2} (136/sq mi)
- Time zone: UTC+02:00 (EET)
  - Summer (DST): UTC+03:00 (EEST)
- Postal code: 125200
- Area code: (+40) 02 38
- Vehicle reg.: BZ
- Website: www.primariepogoanele.ro

Pogoanele (Romanian pronunciation: [poˈɡo̯anele]) is a town in the southeastern part of Buzău County, Muntenia, Romania. The town administers one village, Căldărăști.

Pogoanele was declared a town in April 1989, as a result of the Romanian rural systematization program. It is located in the south-central part of the county, in the middle of the Bărăgan Plain, at about 40 km (25 mi) from Buzău, the county seat. It is traversed by the DN2C road, which runs from Buzău to Slobozia. The railway station (3 km (1.9 mi) from the town center) is on the CFR line connecting Urziceni and Făurei.

Historical population
Year	Pop.	±%
1992	7,768	—
2002	7,795	+0.3%
2011	7,275	−6.7%
2021	6,384	−12.2%
Source: Census data

== Natives ==
- Mircea Frățică (born 1957), middleweight judoka
- Ciprian Perju (born 1996), footballer
- Ion A. Rădulescu-Pogoneanu (1870–1945), Romanian pedagogue
- Ilie Stan (born 1967), football player and manager
