= Alexandru Cazaban =

Romanian writer

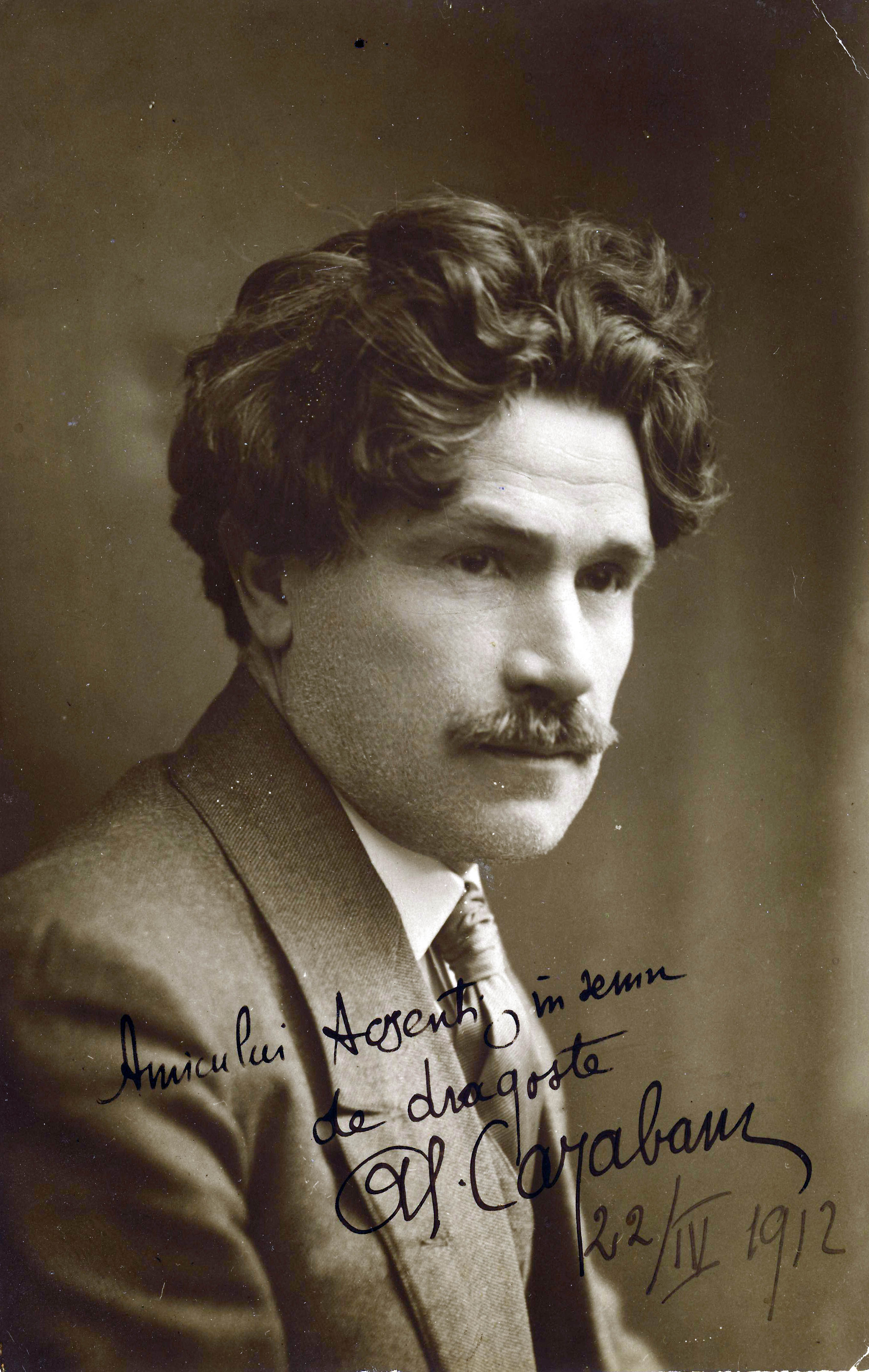
Alexandru Cazaban

Alexandru Cazaban (October 6, 1872–May 24, 1966) was a Romanian prose writer.

Born in Iași to François Cazaban, who was of French origin, he graduated from the city's National College in 1895, following which he entered an architecture school that he did not complete. He worked by turns as a proofreader at Românul, a rural schoolteacher, a draftsman, a veterinarian and a civil servant at the bridge and highway agency, before re-entering the newspaper business with the support of Alexandru Vlahuță and Barbu Ștefănescu Delavrancea. In 1898, he edited Bolta rece magazine at Iași, publishing humorous vignettes. His own publishing debut involved satirical sketches that appeared in Anton Bacalbașa's Moș Teacă.

Cazaban contributed short prose for the second series of Ion Luca Caragiale's Moftul român, as well as for Zeflemeaua, Revista literară, Flacăra, Viața Românească, Luceafărul, Universul and Adevărul. He wrote short stories, sketches and tales published in volumes that included Deștept băiat! (1904), Chipuri și suflete (1908), Oameni cumsecade (1911), Între femeie și pisică (1913), Păcatul sfinției sale (1915), Dureri neînțelese (1917), Între frac și cojoc (1922) and Văzute și auzite (1958), as well as the 1924 novel Un om supărător. His writings evoked provincial life and also cast a somewhat harsh light on the rural environment. An avid hunter, his 1939 Povestiri vânătorești deals with the topic. In 1937, he won the Romanian national prize for prose. He died in Bucharest in 1966 at the age of 93.
