= Calistrat Hogaș =

Moldavian and later Romanian prose writer

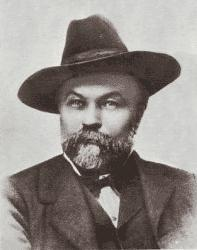
Calistrat Hogaș

Calistrat Hogaș (born Calistrat Dumitriu; April 19, 1848 – August 28, 1917) was a Moldavian, later Romanian prose writer. The son of a Tecuci priest, he studied at the University of Iași before beginning an over four-decade career as a high school teacher, often at Piatra Neamț. Meanwhile, he made several false starts as a writer before finding a suitable genre, namely stories drawn from his mountain rambles that appeared starting in 1907. He did not manage to collect his works during his lifetime, but these appeared to great success in 1921.

== Biography ==
=== Origins and literary career ===
Born in Tecuci, his parents were Gheorghe Dumitriu, a Romanian Orthodox archpriest, and his wife Mărioara (née Stanciu), the daughter of a serdar from Pechea, Galați County. He was the first or second of eight children, and various birthdates between 1847 and 1852 have been suggested, but April 19, 1848 appears likeliest. His adopted surname was a nickname of his grandfather's that was assigned to him in primary school as a way to distinguish him from other pupils named Dumitriu. After completing the primary grades in his native town, he attended middle and high school at Academia Mihăileană and at the National College in Iași from 1859 to 1867. Alexandru Dimitrie Xenopol, Vasile Conta, Alexandru Lambrior, Constantin Dimitrescu-Iași, and George Panu were all classmates, and he befriended the last three. From 1867 to 1869, he attended the literature faculty of the University of Iași. Panu and Lambrior remained university classmates, and he was noticed as a good student during high school by Titu Maiorescu, with whom he also came in touch during his university years. Nevertheless, he did not join the Junimea society of which the latter was president, and which at the time was a sure path to advancement of one's literary reputation. From 1869, he worked as a teacher of Romanian language and literature at the new gymnasium in Piatra Neamț, where he was also director and handled all the humanities courses. In January 1870, he married Elena Gheorghiu, the daughter of a Piatra Neamț priest; the couple had eight children. A lover of Greek and Roman culture, he gave them names such as Cleopatra, Cornelia, Sidonia and Aețiu. In 1878, he left Piatra Neamț for a period of three years, teaching first at the gymnasium in Tecuci and then at a normal school in Iași, and then lived in the former town from 1881 to 1885. He subsequently taught in Tecuci, Alexandria, and Roman (at the Roman-Vodă High School); during this period, from the mid-1880s to the late 1890s, he published only sporadically. His reluctance to write was deepened by the accidental death of his 18-year-old daughter in 1894. From 1898, he was a teacher at the Boarding High School in Iași.

His literary debut consisted of verses that appeared in the Piatra Neamț newspaper Corespondența provincială in 1874. In the same town, he founded a newspaper, Situațiunea, that briefly appeared in 1878. While living there, he began climbing the local mountains. Between 1881 and 1882, he was a school inspector in Neamț County, coming to know Ion Luca Caragiale in this capacity. From his return to Piatra Neamț in 1881 until 1885, Hogaș contributed to Asachi magazine; his first contributions to the Amintiri din o călătorie series appeared there from 1882 to 1884, but they had no resonance with critics. Invited to submit poetry to a Bucharest magazine, he refused, probably aware of their antiquated style. He continued the Amintiri series in Xenopol's magazine Arhiva from 1893 to 1902; these contributions also went unnoticed, as the magazine was not taken seriously.

The 1906 establishment of Viața Românească, the formation of a group surrounding the magazine and his resulting friendship with Garabet Ibrăileanu were crucial to his career; his În munții Neamțului and other travel notes appeared there from 1907 to 1912. He cut an odd and colorful picture at Iași: a large man, dressed unusually, wearing a woolen jacket in all seasons, with a huge overcoat and an equally sizable hat, wearing thick boots in winter and custom made sandals in summer, he hustled between the three high schools where he taught, after a breakfast consisting of a chunk of meat roasted over coals, seasoned with a handful of onions and washed down with a pot of coffee. His Viața Românească colleagues respected Hogaș and treated him as a friend, even though he was older than all of them; they asked his advice and unanimously admired his contributions. Caragiale considered him a great writer and spoke glowingly of his writings.

=== Publication challenges and legacy ===
He decided to collect his writings in book form in 1912, the year he retired from teaching. Hogaș insisted on making the manuscript corrections himself, but the copies were destroyed because they contained a devastating number of typographical errors; the new edition, from 1914, was almost entirely destroyed in a fire that burned down the warehouse of Viața Românească. He was rejected for a prize from the Romanian Academy, most likely due to a report drawn up by Ioan D. Caragiani. Nostalgic for his teaching days, Hogaș found his strength diminished and compared his retirement to Ovid's exile in Tomis. He withdrew to Piatra Neamț in his last years and did not live to see his book appear, due to the ongoing World War I; he died at Roman. Initially interred there, he was later exhumed, the coffin transported on an ox-drawn cart covered in pine branches, and reburied at Piatra Neamț, in accordance with his wishes. It was only in 1921 that his collected works appeared: covering two volumes, Amintiri dintr-o călătorie and În munții Neamțului, the second was prefaced by Mihail Sadoveanu, a devoted admirer. The book was a critical success, and he was posthumously granted the Romanian Writers' Society Prize in 1921. A storyteller full of charm, he referred to himself as an "explorer" of Moldavia's "colossal" mountains. Riding his horse Pisicuța, he would take random journeys into the mountains. Never keeping a diary, he would set down his observations in the genre that won him posthumous renown: the travel account. His prose is strongly marked by reminiscences from his reading, which he integrated into a parodic and humorous vision.

While George Călinescu considered him merely "a talented, one-dimensional dilettante", other critics, including Ibrăileanu, Tudor Vianu, Vladimir Streinu (who edited his works between 1944 and 1947), Șerban Cioculescu, Constantin Ciopraga (who put out another edition in 1956), Al. Săndulescu, and Alexandru Călinescu treated his writings with understanding and objectivity. They commented on his literary discourse, his romanticism, evocation of landscapes and classical allusions. In 1944, Cioculescu classified him as a practitioner of the Baroque, while Alexandru Călinescu observed that his corpus is an amalgam, a mosaic of styles and mannerisms. A critical edition, with preface and commentary by Săndulescu, appeared in 1984. Zigu Ornea noted the "observer's and moralist's talent" with which he imagined "tales of an ineffable quality. He was not just a poet of the forest universe but also had an excellent, memorable ability to sketch characters, an extraordinary gift for recreating dialogue." He went on to deny that Hogaș was another Ion Creangă, as had been claimed, "but a city dweller who knew the habits of the mountain environment and the practices of the mountain people", endowed with "a rare capacity for depicting nature, with all its meanings and its beauties", "a seductive refinement and charm and surprise and delight". Excerpts from Hogaș appeared in textbooks for many years, but interest in him waned after the Romanian Revolution, to the point that Nicolae Manolescu called him "a nearly forgotten writer". In 2007, in an effort to make him relevant for a modern audience, Mircea A. Diaconu published a book-length monographic study of Hogaș.

After his death, his widow and two of his daughters continued to reside in his house in Piatra Neamț; in 1939, his daughter Sidonia opened a private museum in one of the rooms. In 1969, the entire house was opened to the public as a state-owned museum, and since 1994 it has attempted to reconstitute the appearance it had during the writer's last five years. Several sites connected with Hogaș are listed as historic monuments by Romania's Ministry of Culture and Religious Affairs. In Tecuci, there are two: his mid-19th century house and a more modern bust. Piatra Neamț has three: the 19th century house that is now a museum, a 1924 bas-relief that features him in the center, and his grave. His 19th century villa in Roman is also listed. Calistrat Hogaș National College in Piatra Neamț, where he taught, has borne his name since 1970, while Tecuci's Calistrat Hogaș National College has done so since 1990.

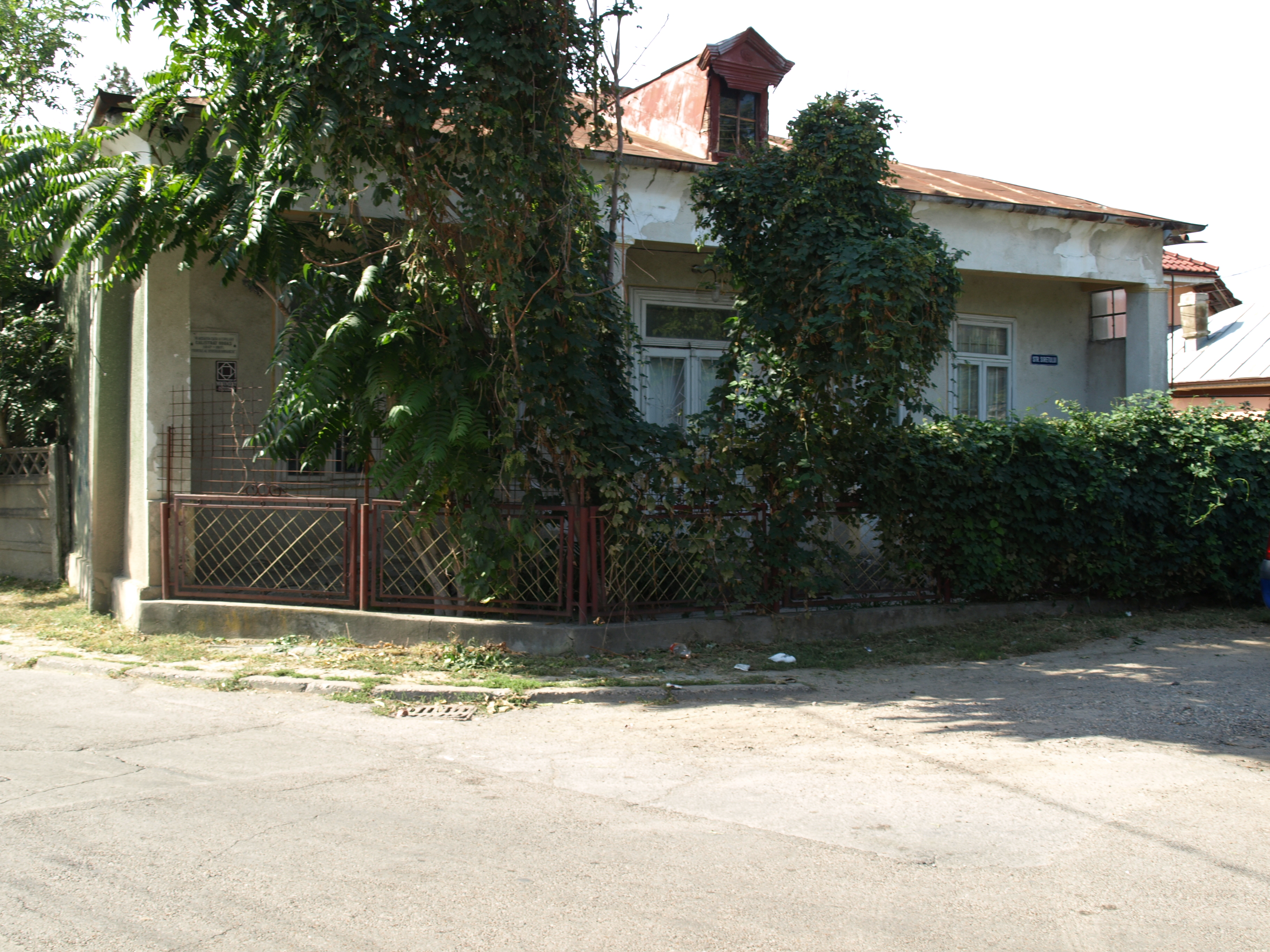
Hogaș' Tecuci house

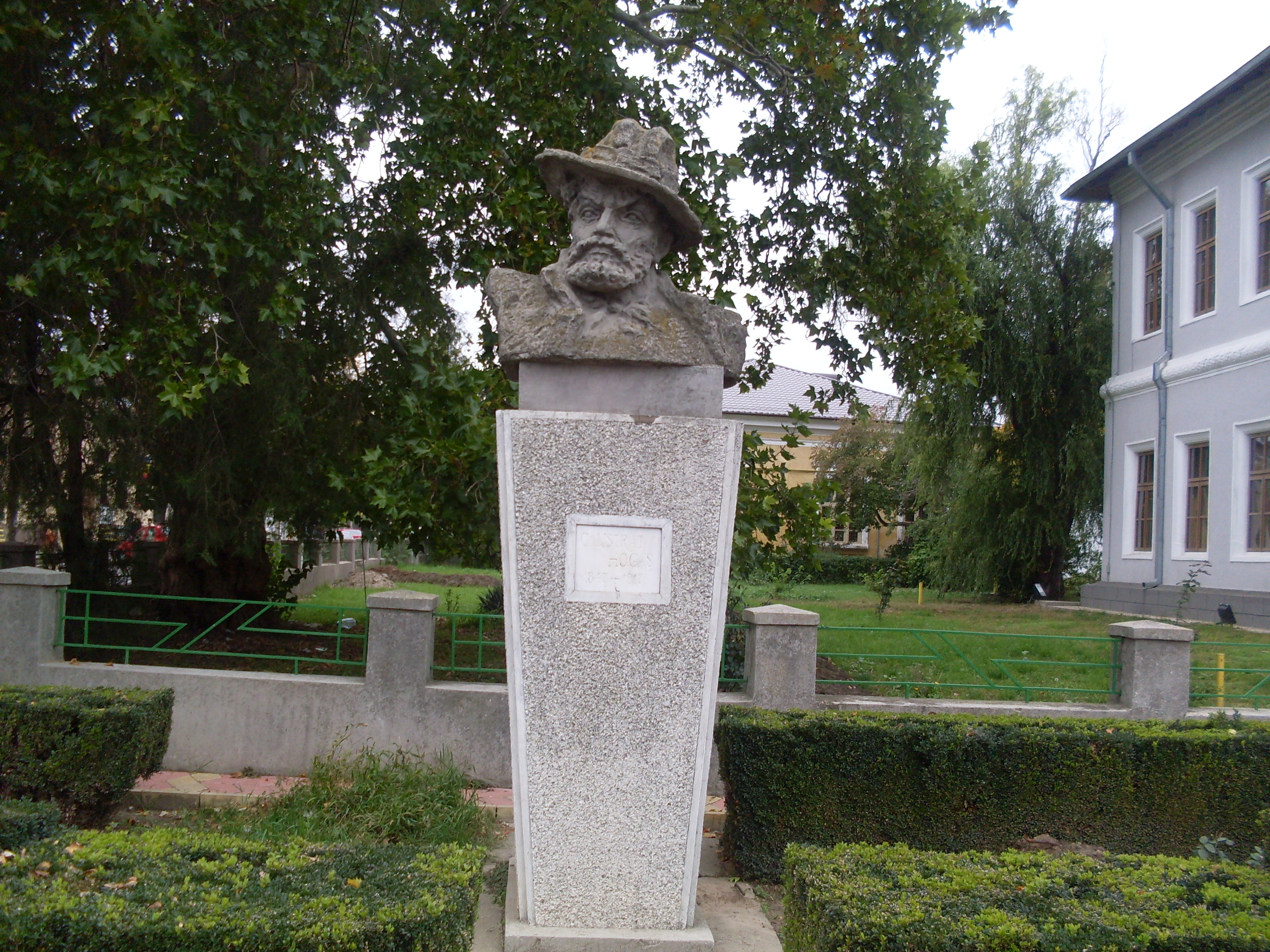
Bust in Tecuci

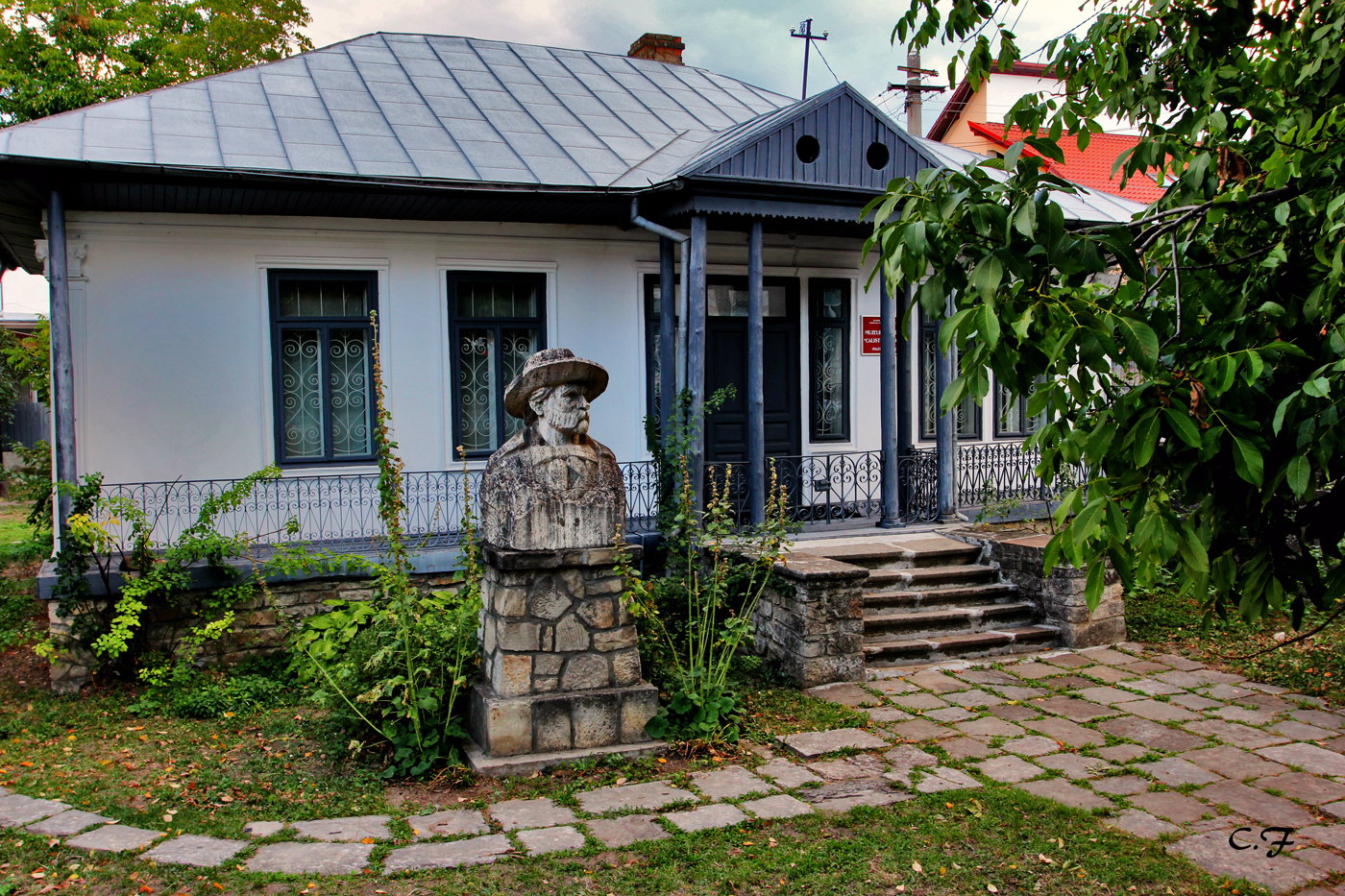
House and museum in Piatra Neamț

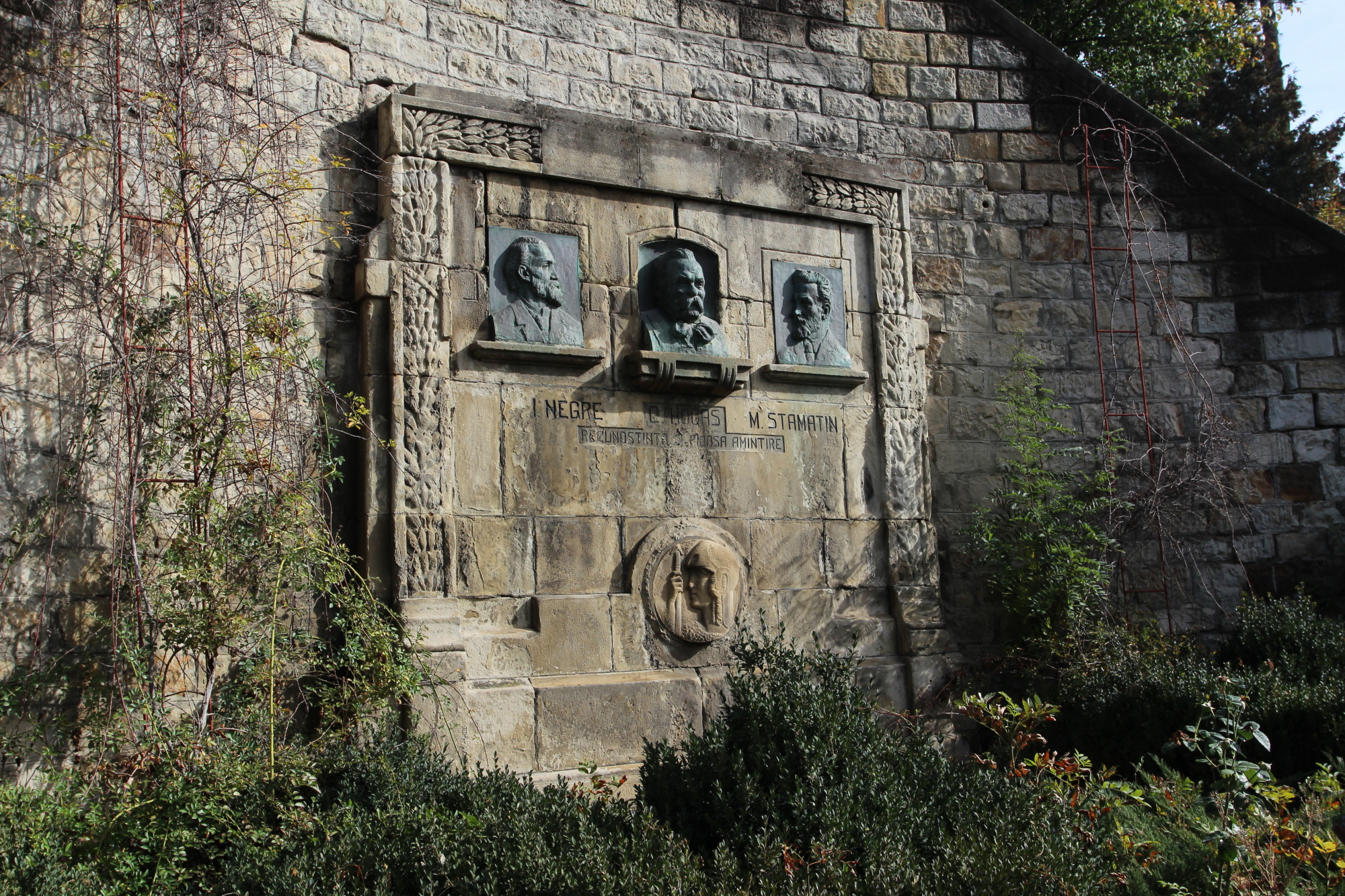
Bas-relief in Piatra Neamț

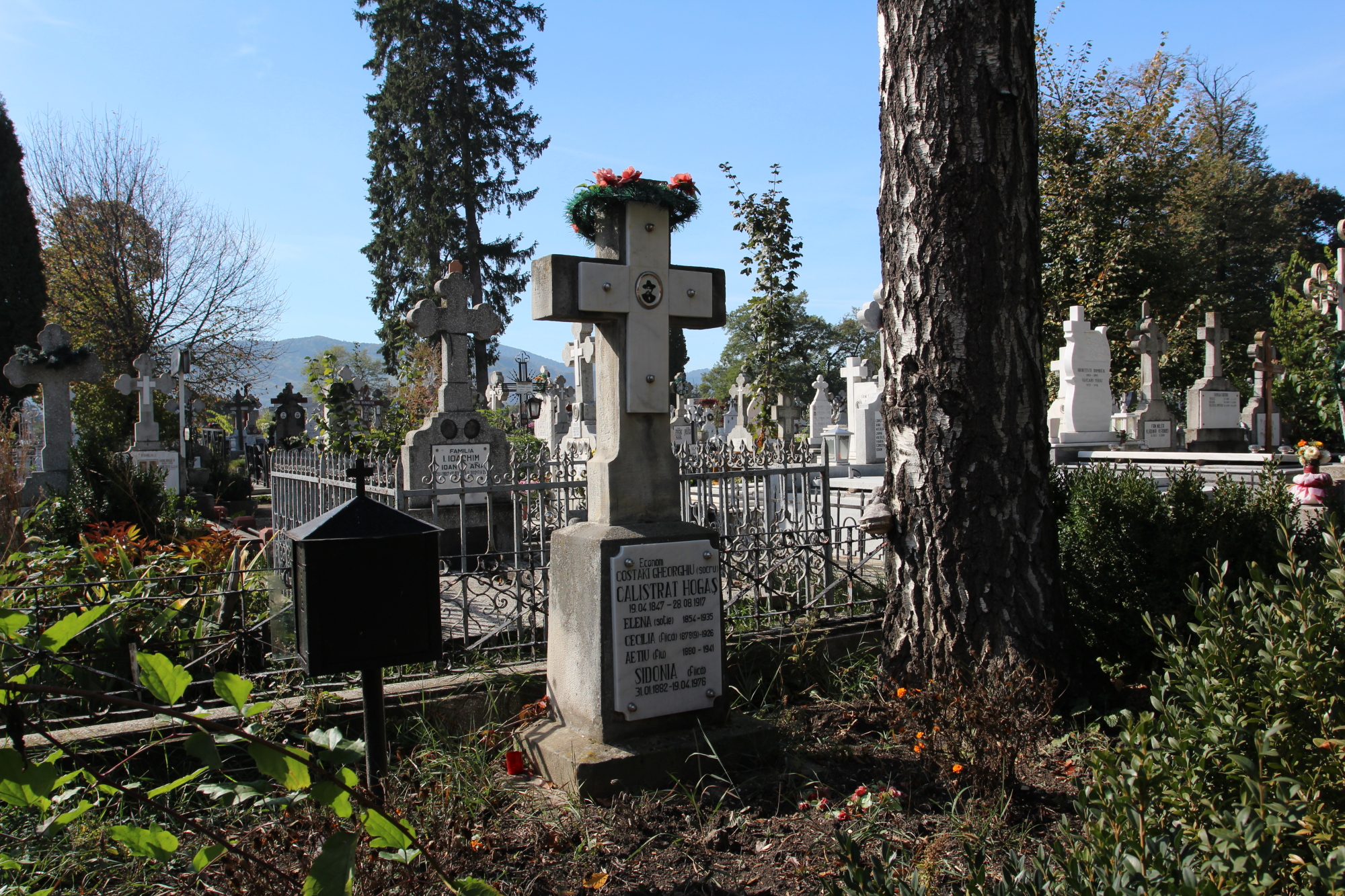
Grave in Piatra Neamț

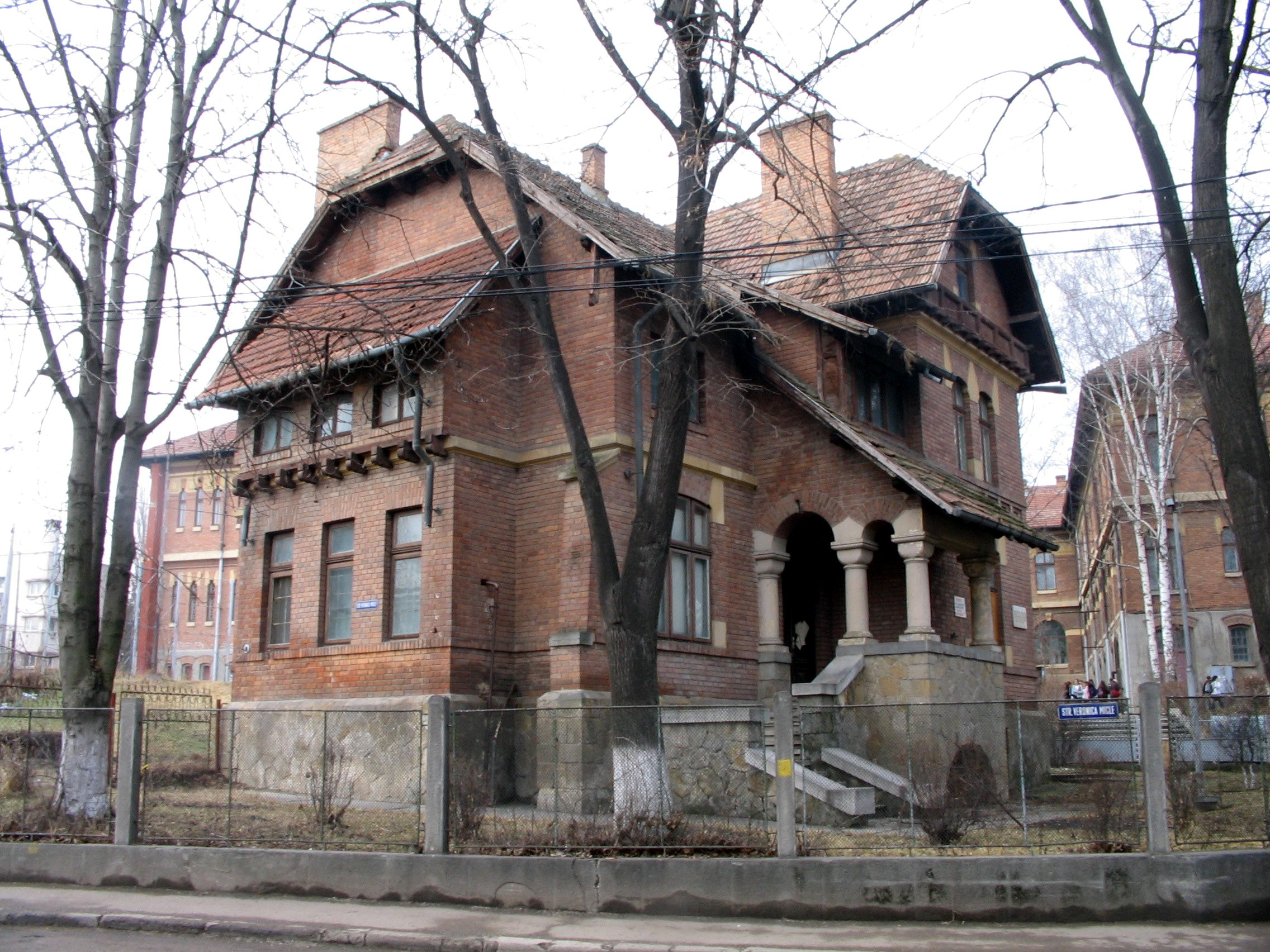
Villa in Roman

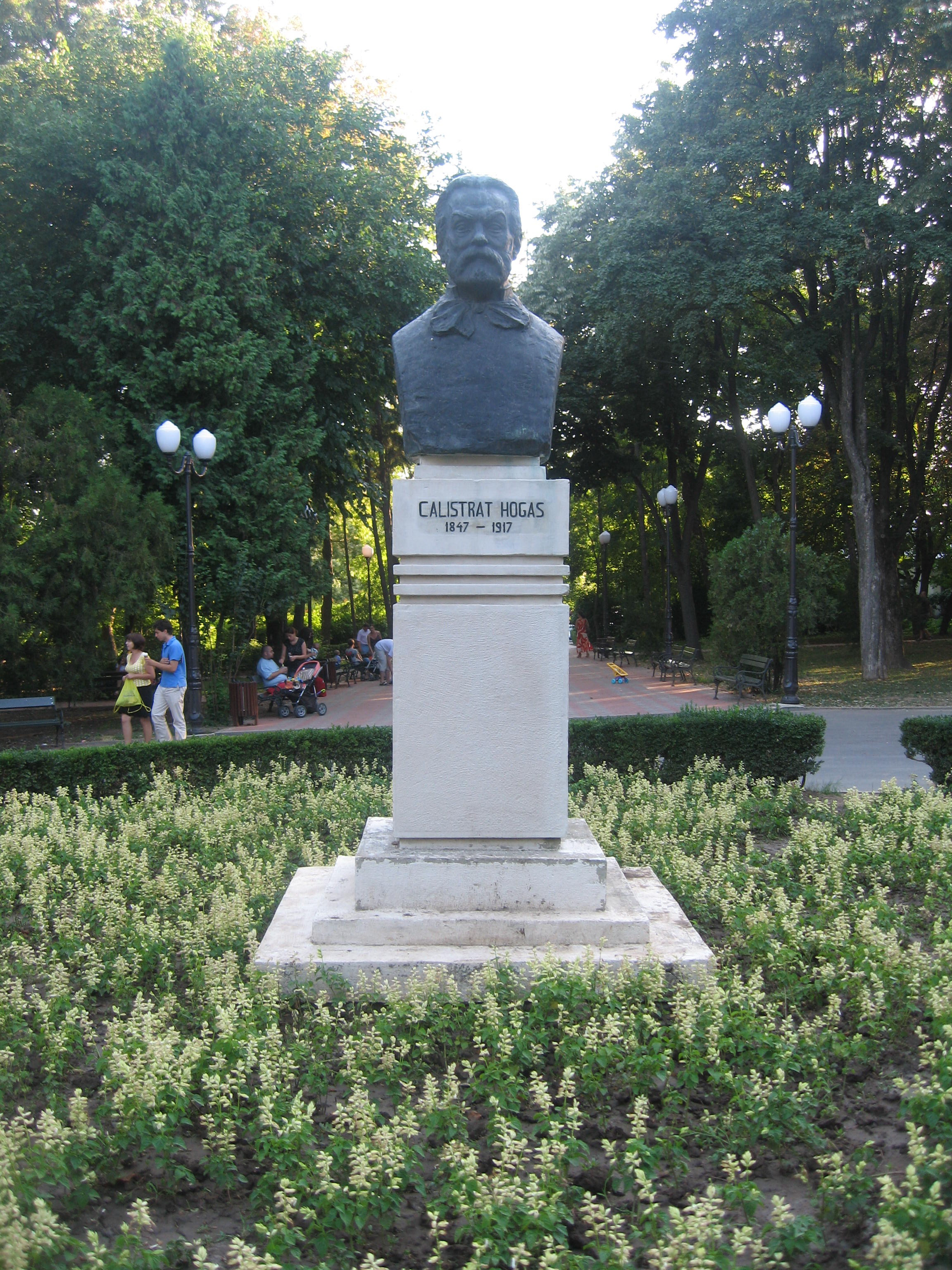
Bust in Iași
