= Ilie Șerbănescu =

Romanian economist (1942–2024)

Ilie Șerbănescu (20 July 1942 – 8 April 2024) was a Romanian economist and the Minister of Reform under Prime Minister Victor Ciorbea.

== Biography ==
After completing his secondary studies at the Ion Luca Caragiale High School, Șerbănescu graduated from the Academy of Economic Studies, Bucharest and earned the Doctor of Economics degree in 1978. He was a columnist at Bloombiz. Șerbănescu died on 8 April 2024, at the age of 81.

== Bibliography ==
Șerbănescu was the author of

- Corporatiile transnationale (1978)
- Terra, portret in alb-negru (1980)
- Reforma economica in Romania: jumatatile de masura dubleaza costurile sociale (1994
- Manifestul partidului imobilist (1996)

and over 1,500 articles and studies on reform in Romania.
