= Oana Niculescu-Mizil =

Romanian politician (born 1975)

- Born: August 11, 1975 (age 50); Bucharest, Romania
- Education: Ion Luca Caragiale National College
- Alma mater: Spiru Haret University; Carol I National Defence University
- Occupation: Business woman
- Known for: Member of the Chamber of Deputies of Romania
- Political party: Social Democratic Party
- Partner(s): Jamil Tohme; Marian Vanghelie
- Relatives: Paul Niculescu-Mizil (grandfather)

Oana Niculescu-Mizil Ștefănescu (born August 11, 1975) is a Romanian politician. A member of the Social Democratic Party (PSD) since 2000, with an interlude as an independent during 2012, she sat in the Romanian Chamber of Deputies for Bucharest from 2008 to 2015.

== Biography ==
She was born in Bucharest to Coman Nicolae Ștefănescu and Lidia Niculescu-Mizil; her maternal grandfather was Paul Niculescu-Mizil, a Ceaușescu-era Communist politician. She had one brother, Răzvan, who died in a motorcycle accident in 2005, aged 28. A 1994 graduate of I. L. Caragiale National College, she attended Spiru Haret University from 2000 to 2003, studying Marketing and International Business. She also holds a 2009 master's degree from the Carol I National Defence University, where she studied security and national defense. From 2000 to 2002, she worked in the foreign affairs department of President Ion Iliescu's administration, focusing on the Middle East, Asia, and Latin America. She has headed a luxury chocolate company since 2003, and has been honorary director of a media consortium since 2004.

Joining the PSD in 2000, Niculescu-Mizil was elected to represent Bucharest's Ferentari neighborhood in Parliament in 2008, and served on its committees for foreign affairs and Romanians abroad during her first term. In 2010, protesting what she saw as the "fraudulent" adoption of a pensions law, she appeared in Parliament in a prison uniform borrowed from the Jilava penitentiary. Prior to addressing legislators, President Traian Băsescu asked her, "Do you really think you needed to create a circus, madam?" In March 2012, after two years heading the Călărași County chapter of the PSD, she was removed from that position after clashing with the party leadership, objecting to its decision to dismiss Marian Vanghelie as head of the Bucharest party organization. Days later, she resigned from the party, alleging that it was no longer promoting advantages for ordinary people, instead advancing the personal interests of certain of its leaders. For the 2012 election, she ran on the lists of the Social Liberal Union, backed by the PSD, and won a new term. Initially assigned to the culture committee, she was later placed on the foreign policy committee. In October 2014, she received a three-year suspended sentence in a conflict of interest case that arose after she hired her mother in her parliamentary office. The following March, when a corruption investigation against Vanghelie began, she resigned from the Chamber, citing a wish not to impede the judicial process. In October 2016, her three-year suspended sentence was reduced to one year.

In 1999, she married Lebanese businessman Jamil Tohme. In 2012, she and Vanghelie, the mayor of Sector 5, which included her electoral district, confirmed that for the past year, they were in a relationship that had begun after each separated from their respective spouse. The couple had a daughter in 2015. Oana Mizil is nicknamed Laleaua neagră ("The Black Tulip") after a legendary woman who benefited the Roma residents of Ferentari.
