= Victor Rădulescu-Pogoneanu =

Romanian diplomat

Victor I. Rădulescu-Pogoneanu (September 21, 1910 – March 10, 1962) was a Romanian diplomat. He helped set up negotiations to remove his country from its alliance with Nazi Germany during World War II. An opponent of the Romanian Communist Party, he was arrested shortly before the establishment of a communist regime and spent the next fifteen years in prison before succumbing to the treatment he received there.

== Biography ==
Born in Bucharest into an upper-class family, his father Ion A. Rădulescu-Pogoneanu, a university professor, was a follower of Titu Maiorescu, while his mother Elena headed the Central School for Girls prior to 1939. His brother was also a distinguished diplomat, while his sister Anina (1902–1994) was active in the Romanian émigré community in Paris during the communist era.

Rădulescu-Pogoneanu obtained university degrees in law, philosophy and sociology before entering the Foreign Ministry in 1934 in spite of advanced paralysis in his lower body. He was assigned to the press and information office. During World War II, while a ministry employee, he took part alongside Camil Demetrescu and Grigore Niculescu-Buzești in organizing secret negotiations with the Allies. Their objective was the exit of Axis Romania from the war, alongside a conspiracy against dictator Ion Antonescu that culminated in the Coup of August 1944. Moreover, as director of the ministerial cabinet and cipher unit, he played an important role both during the war and its immediate aftermath in keeping the country's decision-makers informed. He also passed along information to Western embassies in Bucharest, alerting them to the impending danger of a communist takeover, and sent documents abroad that demonstrated the economic domination and despoilment being practiced by the country's Soviet occupiers. He was dismissed from the ministry in 1946.

A member of the National Peasants' Party, he had helped its leader Iuliu Maniu develop ties with foreign diplomats during the war. Rădulescu-Pogoneanu was arrested in August 1947 following the Tămădău Affair that led to the persecution of numerous individuals within the party. Sentenced that November together with Maniu and four others, he received 25 years' imprisonment for conspiracy and treason, with an additional 55 years for three other charges. One account relates that, charged with abetting "foreign traitors", he replied that he was only prevented from doing so lest his ill health impede their activities. He passed through the prisons at Malmaison, Galați, Sighet, Râmnicu Sărat, and Văcărești. He spent nearly four years at Galați, after which he was transferred to Sighet.

While at Sighet Prison, where he was mainly kept isolated from other prisoners, a medical examination found he was suffering from a variety of physical ailments, including spastic paraplegia, hypoesthesia and sphincter of Oddi dysfunction. By the time he reached Râmnicu Sărat Prison following the closure of Sighet in 1955, he was confined to a bed in his cell. In 1956, he asked for a medical examination, and the prison authorities recorded a "hostile attitude" on his part toward the leadership and staff due to complaints about his treatment. Unable to leave his bed when ordered, he was, as a result, beaten by prison warden Alexandru Vișinescu and his guards. In the autumn of 1961, by which time it was too late to save his life, he was transferred to the Văcărești prison hospital and died there the following March.

According to Neagu Djuvara, the pro-communist sociologist Mihai Ralea had suggested to Rădulescu-Pogoneanu to be "more flexible" with the prison administration. His interlocutor reportedly answered: "neither my health nor my life are for sale". His wife Cici was arrested shortly after Victor and sent to prison for six months in December 1947 for failing to report his activities. Arrested again in 1952, she was questioned about her husband's ties with Lucrețiu Pătrășcanu. Two years later, she testified at the latter's show trial, declaring the two men had carried on negotiations between government and opposition during King Michael's "royal strike", a fact that was used to show Pătrășcanu was guilty of conspiracy.
