= Paul Niculescu-Mizil =

Romanian politician (1923–2008)

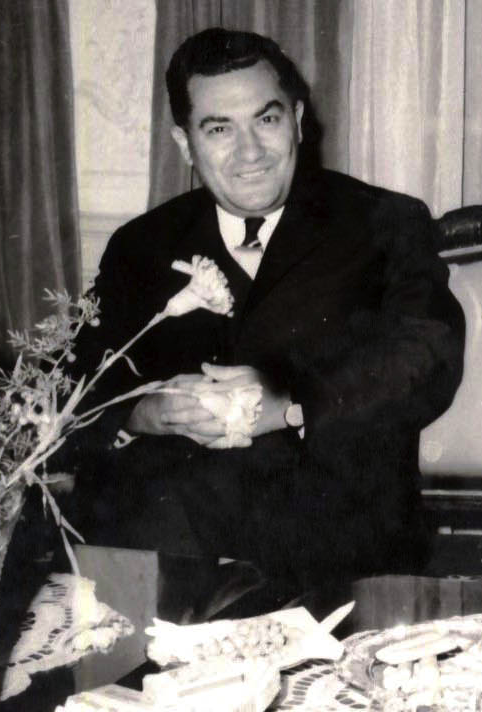
- Niculescu-Mizil in 1966
- Born: 25 November 1923; Bucharest, Romania
- Died: 5 December 2008 (aged 85)
- Resting place: Cernica Monastery
- Occupation: politician
- Known for: Education Minister, Finance Minister, Deputy Prime Minister
- Notable work: helped distance Romania from the Soviet Union
- Political party: Romanian Communist Party
- Spouse: Lidia
- Children: 6
- Father: Gheorghe Niculescu-Mizil
- Relatives: Oana Niculescu-Mizil (granddaughter)
- Awards: Order of the Star of the Romanian Socialist Republic

Paul Niculescu-Mizil (Romanian pronunciation: [ˈpa.ul nikuˈlesku miˈzil]; 25 November 1923 – 5 December 2008) was a Romanian communist politician. Joining the Romanian Communist Party due to his background and intellectual aspirations, he was prominent in the agitprop department during Gheorghe Gheorghiu-Dej's rule. Under Nicolae Ceaușescu, he went from handling foreign affairs in the late 1960s to holding ministerial posts in the 1970s to a marginal position in the 1980s. After the regime's collapse in 1989, he spent time in prison before emerging as a vocal defender of the system he had served.

== Biography ==
=== Propaganda and international affairs ===
Born in Bucharest, Niculescu-Mizil was raised in a left-wing milieu, with both his parents being activists of the Social Democratic Party of Romania (PSDR) and the Socialist Party of Romania (PS). His father, Gheorghe Niculescu-Mizil, was reportedly a shop assistant, trade unionist, and self-taught poet, known for contributing to PSDR and PS gazettes, from România Muncitoare to Socialismul, and eventually joining the outlawed Communist Party (PCdR or PCR). He was kept under surveillance by the secret police (Siguranța Statului), was prosecuted during the famous Dealul Spirii Trial, and stood as a pro-communist candidate during the 1922 election. According to their official biographers, Gheorghe and his wife Eufrosina Cotor Niculescu-Mizil ran a PCdR meeting house during World War II, as opponents of the Ion Antonescu dictatorship.

Paul Niculescu-Mizil was a student at the military officers' school in Ploiești during the war, and right after King Michael's Coup, his unit was sent to help retake Northern Transylvania. Joining the Communist Party (later "Workers' Party", PMR) in 1945, that year he became head of the student association at the Commercial and Industrial Academy and editor of Tinerețea newspaper. In 1951, he joined the editorial board of the magazine Lupta de Clasă. He taught at the Ștefan Gheorghiu Academy from 1946 to 1950, and was deputy rector and rector there between 1950 and 1954. He entered the PMR's history institute in 1954, holding positions near the top. He was also on the faculty of the C. I. Parhon University, teaching Marxism–Leninism. He joined the central committee of the PMR at the end of 1955, and would remain a member until 1989. He headed the PMR's propaganda and agitation section between 1956 and 1965, where, as Leonte Răutu's deputy, he was one of the few persons with access to the latter's house, and backed his strident attacks on Romanian culture. He played a key role in introducing national Stalinism to Romania and in ensuring the presence of a compliant intelligentsia. While he and his colleague Pavel Țugui promoted a less rigid view of the party's role in culture than their predecessors, who included Mihail Roller, they nonetheless touted a form of communism that was, in the view of political scientist Vladimir Tismăneanu, "arrogant, intransigent and suspicious of any revisionist heresy".

Until the death of Gheorghiu-Dej in 1965, Niculescu-Mizil was a consistent supporter, and helped distance Romania from the Soviet Union beginning in 1964. That year, as part of this trend, he prepared a document on the problems of the global communist and workers' movement, officially adopted by the PMR. Also in 1964, he received one of several awards the regime bestowed upon him, the Order of the Star of the Romanian Socialist Republic, second class. After leaving the propaganda section, he sat on the central committee's secretariat, supervising the party's sections for ideology and for international relations (1965–1972); on the executive committee (1965–1989); and on the permanent presidium (1969–1974). He began holding these positions several months after Gheorghiu-Dej died and Nicolae Ceaușescu came to power in March 1965. Nevertheless, as his loyalty (manifested, for instance, during the purges of an older generation of party members in 1958–1960), political skill, and less rigid thinking meant he was probably slated for a promotion anyway, he felt less of a debt to Ceaușescu than others promoted by the new leader. He portrayed himself as an intellectual, and was viewed as one of the party's ideologues, indeed as its most prominent one after Răutu was marginalized in 1965. In February 1968, he headed the Romanian delegation to a meeting in Budapest that made preparations for the following year's International Meeting of Communist and Workers Parties. There, he made a striking gesture, leaving the room in protest at Soviet attacks on Romania's position of defending the principle of equality and independence within the global communist movement, in particular Czechoslovakia's right to carry out the reforms of the Prague Spring.

=== Ministerial posts, loss of power and post-communist course ===
During Ceaușescu's years in power, he was Education Minister (1972–1976), Finance Minister (1978–1981), and deputy prime minister (1972–1981). He sat in the Great National Assembly from 1957 to 1961 and from 1965 to 1989, successively representing areas in Galați, Timiș, Arad, Bacău, and Satu Mare counties. From 1965 to 1969 he was on the leadership of the Romanian Society for Friendship with the Soviet Union and of the National Committee for Defending Peace, and served as Romania's permanent representative to the Comecon from 1979. As Ceaușescu's rule, the economic, political and cultural excesses of which he openly criticized on several occasions, became more personal and his policies less predictable, Niculescu-Mizil gradually lost influence. He became a marginal figure in the 1980s, despite remaining on the executive committee. He headed Centrocoop, a cooperative union, from 1981 to 1989, and it was the start of his tenure there that marked his real diminution in power.

After the fall of the communist regime in 1989, he was initially in the leadership of the National Salvation Front, but pressure from civil society groups quickly saw him ejected. He was arrested and sent to prison, accused of direct involvement in repressing revolutionary activities in Timișoara and Bucharest, and was incarcerated until 1992. Accounts differ on what in fact occurred: one suggests he had no real power and could not influence events either way, one claims he opposed opening fire on demonstrators in Timișoara, while another states he backed Ceaușescu's decision to use force. Together with Ion Iliescu, who was marginalized during the 1970s, he was among the less dogmatic figures around Ceaușescu. In his last years, he actively attempted to justify the communist dictatorship for the national values he claimed it upheld. Alongside other top party activists, including Manea Mănescu, Ștefan Andrei, and Dumitru Popescu, he promoted the idea of a break between the "Comintern" phase of the 1950s and the later national communism, allegedly patriotic and enlightened.

Although he sought to avoid what Tismăneanu calls the "police-state brutalities and asphyxiating dogmatism of a sclerotic ideology", his defense of the system ignored its classically Stalinist features such as censorship, the Securitate secret police, and hyper-bureaucratic planning. Hence, it was situated within the same intellectual constraints as the Letter of the Six. He discussed the regime during numerous talk-show appearances, where he was countered by representatives of anti-communist civil society groups, and also published his memoirs. He died of heart disease and his body was displayed for public viewing at the Finance Ministry he once headed. This drew criticism from prominent members of the National Liberal Party against then-minister Varujan Vosganian, himself a Liberal. He was buried at Cernica Monastery following a Romanian Orthodox service.

He and his wife Lidia had six children. Of these, a son (Serghei) and two daughters (Donca and Lidia) were biological children, while two sons and a daughter were adopted. Adopting children was fashionable among party elites at the time and helped solidify his position. His granddaughter, through Lidia, is Oana Niculescu-Mizil, herself a politician. Donca was in a ten-year relationship with Nicolae and Elena Ceaușescu's son Nicu; Elena disapproved and intervened to end the romance. Later, Niculescu-Mizil and Nicu Ceaușescu were cellmates at Jilava Prison for six months. Serghei is considered the rebel of the family.
