= Constantin Dimitrescu-Iași =

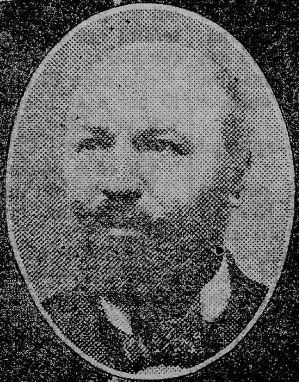
Constantin Dimitrescu-Iași

Constantin Dimitrescu-Iași (November 25, 1849 – April 16, 1923) was a Moldavian, later Romanian philosopher, sociologist and pedagogue.

== Biography ==
Born in Iași, his father was the magistrate Dimitrie Dimitrescu. He attended primary school in his native city from 1856 to 1860, followed by high school from 1860 to 1867. His classmates there included Alexandru Lambrior, George Panu, and Calistrat Hogaș. From 1867 to 1869, he attended the literature and philosophy faculty of the University of Iași, and at the same time worked as a substitute Latin teacher. From 1869 to 1870, Dimitrescu-Iași taught at Botoșani. He again taught at Iași from 1870 to 1872, continuing his university studies in the process. From 1872 to 1875, he was a teacher in Bârlad. He then went to Germany to study at the universities of Berlin (1875–1876) and Leipzig (1876–1877). From 1879 to 1885, he taught aesthetics, history of philosophy, logic, psychology and pedagogy at the University of Iași.

In 1885, Dimitrescu-Iași transferred to the University of Bucharest, where he taught history of ancient and modern philosophy, ethics and aesthetics until his retirement in 1919. An inspector general with the Education Minister, he was also director of the Iași higher normal school, of the University of Bucharest Library (1898–1910), and of the pedagogic seminary run by the university (1899–1919). He served as rector of the University of Bucharest for twelve years, from October 1898 to January 1911. Although he joined Junimea in 1878, Dimitrescu-Iași did not endorse its political orientation, indeed condemning its positions in a series of articles that appeared in Drapelul and Democrația from 1897 to 1898. Dimitrescu-Iași led Revista pedagogică magazine from 1891 to 1898 and was quite familiar with the principles of modern pedagogy. A close associate of Spiru Haret, he made a substantial contribution to the 1898 law for the reform of secondary and higher education. He died in Turnu Severin.

== Views ==
His philosophical outlook was deeply influenced by the European positivism and evolutionism of the 19th century's second half, from which he adopted numerous ideas, sometimes uncritically. Dimitrescu-Iași considered that people were machines in motion, mere complexes of physiological phenomena. An adherent of a monism tinged with materialism, he believed in the unity of matter and spirit and advocated an ethics based on scientific data. He was the first to teach sociology in Romania; his courses were based on Darwinist arguments. In his teaching, he helped circulate certain socialist ideas, but was against their practical application. He wrote several studies on the sociology of literature (Recenzentul; Spiritul democratic în literatură, arte, știință) that did not consistently apply rigorous argumentation.

In the field of aesthetics, Dimitrescu-Iași attempted to reconcile positivism and evolutionism with the ideas of Romantic German philosophy, starting from Johann Friedrich Herbart's formalism, of which he considered himself a disciple. He set forth his ideas in Der Schönheitsbegriff ("The Concept of the Beautiful"), which he partly translated in 1895 in România literară și științifică, as well as in several articles that appeared under the pen name Faust in the newspapers Dreptatea (1896), Drapelul and Democrația (1896–1898). He played an important role in leading Romanian aesthetics toward a more precise understanding of the role and function of art in society. Emphasizing the importance of the natural sciences for aesthetics, he tended to base his opinions on the experimental sciences. He believed that beauty could be explained by experimental methods working together with psychology, particularly those of Völkerpsychologie. Using Herbart's opinions and the experimental findings of Hermann von Helmholtz, Gustav Fechner, Adolf Zeising, Friedrich Theodor Vischer, and Robert von Zimmermann, he distinguished between two aspects of beauty (one purely formal and objective, the other subjective), and theorized that their coming into harmony defined beauty's essence.

For Dimitrescu-Iași, poetic beauty was purely subjective, based on imagination and feeling; the term "beauty" in this case was merely a convention, and the material itself comprised its imagery. But poetic creations could only be considered beautiful through the lens of formal relations between images, the only ones which defined their originality. The artist was seen as a superior being in terms of physiological development, giving rise to the notion of "dynasties of talent". However, these are influenced by their natural and social surroundings, which explains the appearance of creative individuals under democratic conditions.

His view of literary criticism was that the discipline needed to avoid a mechanical application of aesthetic theories, instead explaining the origin, development and dissipation of literary trends. By adhering to objectivity, it forms judgments based not on the value of the work's subject, but on the originality of formal relations and the author's sincerity. This is because in art, beauty is equivalent to truth, and is more thoroughly explained by the laws of emotional life. Some of his opinions allowed him to understand and sympathize with many of Constantin Dobrogeanu-Gherea's principles, whom he assisted in his journalistic activity.
