= Ion A. Rădulescu-Pogoneanu =

Romanian pedagogue

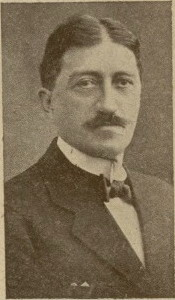
I.P. Radulescu, 1926

Ion A. Rădulescu-Pogoneanu (born Ion A. Rădulescu; 14 August 1870 – 14 March 1945) was a Romanian pedagogue.

== Biography ==
Born in 1870 in Pogoanele, Buzău County, he studied for six years at Leipzig University, obtaining his doctorate in philosophy in July 1901 with thesis Über das Leben und die Philosophie Contas. He then became a professor at the University of Bucharest, and was elected a corresponding member of the Romanian Academy in 1919. A contributor to Convorbiri Literare and România Jună magazines, he helped popularize knowledge of pedagogy in his country. Among his works are a biography of Johann Heinrich Pestalozzi, a book on the phenomenon of education, and one on the problems of Romanian culture. He was a follower of Titu Maiorescu's ideas. His wife Elena was a girls' school director; he had a daughter and two sons, including Victor Rădulescu-Pogoneanu, who became diplomats.

== Publications ==
- Rădulescu-Pogoneanu, Ion (1927). I.-H. Pestalozzi: O schiță a vieței și a ideilor sale (in Romanian). București: Cartea românească. OCLC 251228062.
- Rădulescu-Pogoneanu, Ion (2014). Viața și filosofia lui Vasile Conta (in Romanian). Translated by Cînța, Adriana. Craiova: Editura Aius. ISBN 9786065624047. OCLC 1043073834.
