= Grigore Tocilescu =

Romanian historian (1850–1909)

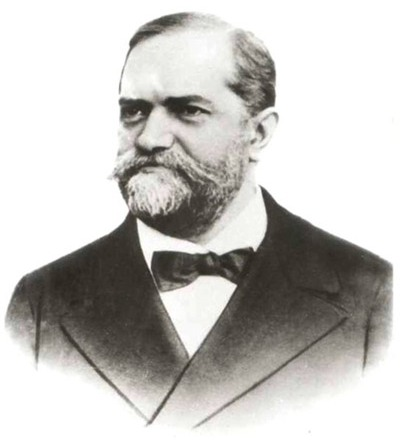
- Professor Grigore Tocilescu
- Born: 26 October 1850; Fefelei village, Mizil town, Prahova County, Wallachia
- Died: 18 September 1909 (aged 58); Bucharest, Kingdom of Romania
- Citizenship: Romanian
- Known for: Marele Dicționar Geografic al României, research on Dacia
- Scientific career
- Fields: History, Archaeology, Epigraphy, Folkloristics
- Workplaces: Romanian Academy

Grigore George Tocilescu (26 October 1850 – 18 September 1909) was a Romanian historian, archaeologist, epigrapher and folkorist, and member of the Romanian Academy.

He was a professor of ancient history at the University of Bucharest, author of Marele Dicționar Geografic al României (The Great Geographical Dictionary of Romania), general secretary of the Romanian Ministry of Teaching and multiple times senator, with conservative political views. Tocilescu is one of the first Romanian historians who focused on the study of civilizations in ancient Dacia. As a folklorist he collaborated on the publication of a folkloristics compendium.

== Life ==
=== Education ===
After finishing primary and secondary school in Ploiești, Tocilescu went to Bucharest where he graduated from the Saint Sava National College. He then studied in universities in Prague and Vienna, where he obtained the Doctor of Philosophy title and the license to practice law. Back in Romania, in 1881 he became professor of ancient history and epigraphy at the University of Bucharest.

=== Involvement ===
In 1884 the Archaeological Seminary's Library was established through Tocilescu's grant.

At the death of Romanian historian, Romantic author, academic, and politician Vasile Alexandrescu Urechia, November 21, 1901, Tocilescu delivered the funeral oration.

== Professional activity ==
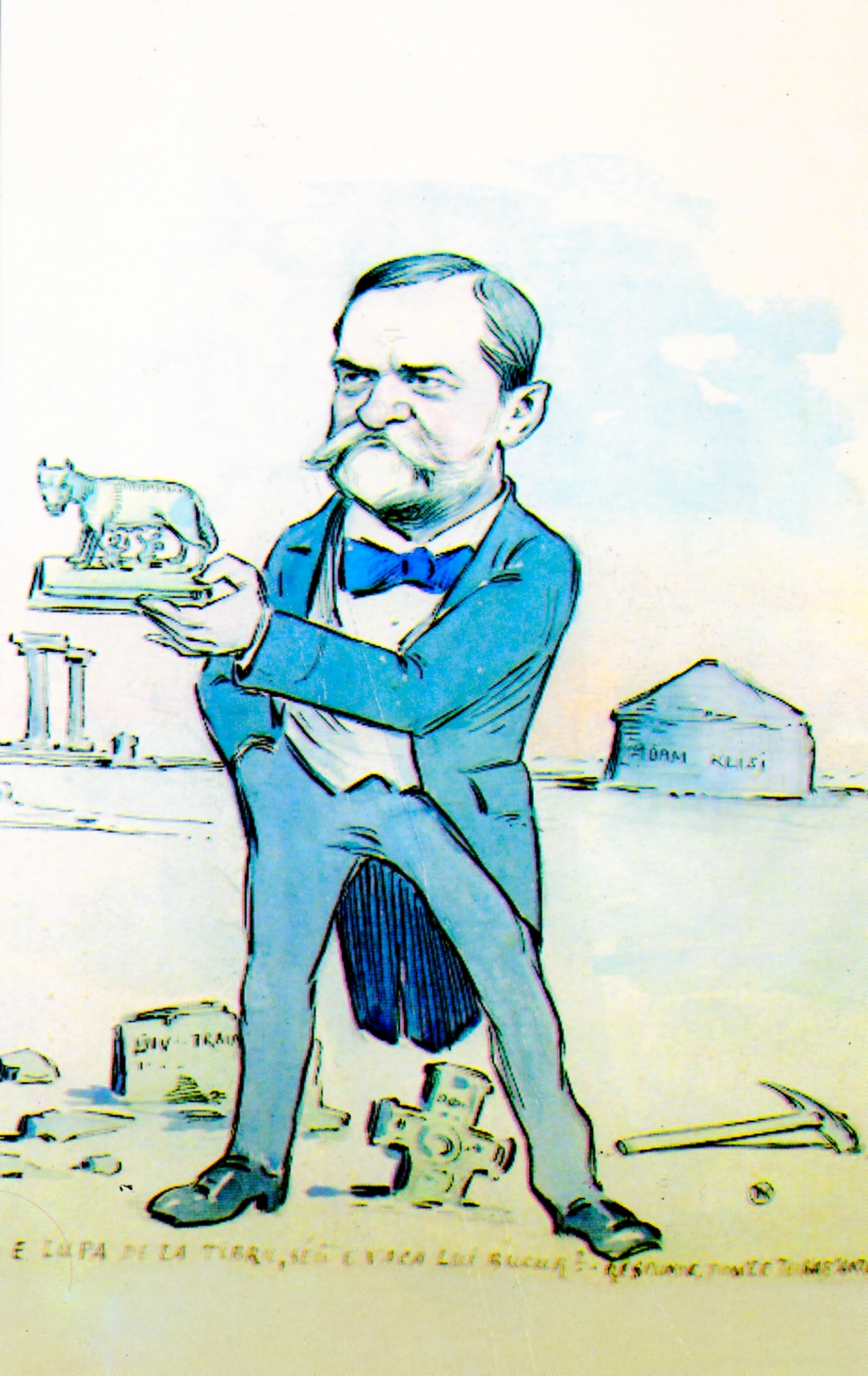
Grigore Tocilescu - caricature by Nicolae Petrescu Găină

In 1877 Tocilescu went to Moscow, to the Rumyantsev Museum, where he copied the book From the Beginning of the First World (De-nceputul lumiei de-ntâiu), written by Mihail Moxa, and sent the copy to Bogdan Petriceicu Hasdeu, who published it in Cuvente den batrâni (vol. I, 1878). The work is a universal history that begins with the "creation of the world", speaks of the Assyrians, Egyptians, Persians, then passes to the Romans. It makes a brief history of the Roman Republic, after which it lists the emperors of the West and the East until the establishment of the Turkish rule in Europe and ends with the first battles of the Turks with the Romanians in 1489. Later, he left for Paris to continue his studies in the French archives and libraries, about Dimitrie Cantemir. On this occasion he attended courses at the Collège de France and the École Pratique de Hautes-Etudes (Sorbonne).

Returning to the country, he was appointed director of the National Museum of Antiquities and held the position of professor of ancient history and epigraphy at the University of Bucharest (1881). From the point of view of archaeology, Tocilescu was the initiator of the Romanian archaeological excavations in Dobruja. He is co-author of the work The Great Geographical Dictionary of Romania published in 5 volumes in Bucharest between 1898-1902. He was general secretary at the Ministry of Education and, several times, conservative senator. Tocilescu is one of the first historians to study the civilizations on the territory of the former Dacia. He left three impressive works: Dacia before the Romans (Dacia înainte de romani), the Adamclisi Monument (Monumentul de la Adamclisi) in collaboration with O. Benndorf and G. Niemann and Fouilles et recherches archéologiques en Roumanie.

He was also concerned with the republishing of some fundamental works, such as The Chronicle of the Antiquity of the Romanian-Moldavian-Vlachs (Hronicul vechimei a româno-moldo-vlahilor) (Ed. Academiei, 1901) by Dimitrie Cantemir.

== Bibliography ==
- Cumu se scrie la noi istoria (How the history gets written in our lands), Bucharest, 1873
- Dacia înainte de Romani (Dacia before the Romans), Bucharest, 1880 - One of the first history books on the Pre-Roman Dacian subject
- Manual de istoria română: pentru școlele secundare de ambe-sexe, Bucuresci, Lito-Tipografia Carol Göbl, 1894
- Marele Dicționar Geografic al României (The Great Geographical Dictionary of Romania), Bucharest, 1898–1902, 5 volumes
- Materialuri Folkloristice, Bucharest, 1900
- Balade și doine, (prefață Marin Bucur), București, Editura Tineretului, 1958

== Reissue ==
- 534 Slavo-Romanian historical documents from Wallachia and Moldova, regarding the connections with Transylvania (1346–1603) from the archives of Brașov and Bistrița in original Slavic text accompanied by Romanian translation, printed in Vienna in 1905–1906 in Adolf Holzhausen Workshops, Sep 28, 1909, reprinted "Casa Românească" Bookstore, 1931
- History of the Romanians, (re-edition) Tipo Moldova Publishing House, 2010
- Ballads and doines (reissue), Miracol Publishing House, 2010; Dacia XXI Publishing House, Cluj-Napoca, 2011, ISBN 978-606-604-096-9.

== See also ==
- Dacia
- List of Romanian archaeologists
