= Alexandru Philippide =

Romanian linguist and philologist (1859–1933)

Alexandru I. Philippide
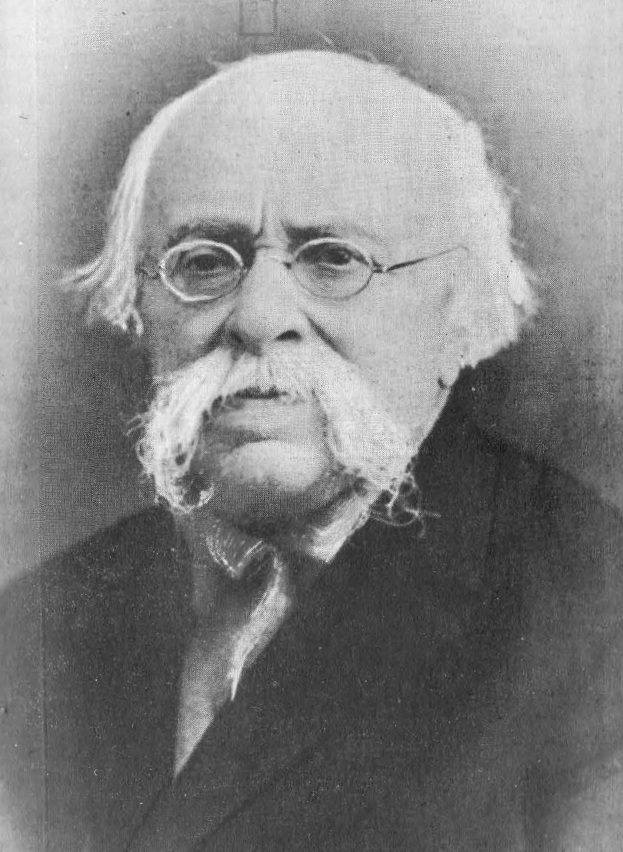
- Born: May 1, 1859; Bârlad, United Principalities
- Died: August 12, 1933 (aged 74); Iași, Kingdom of Romania

Academic background
- Influences: Timotei Cipariu, Bogdan Petriceicu Hasdeu, Mihail Kogălniceanu, Alexandru Lambrior, Titu Maiorescu, Hermann Paul, Gustav Weigand

Academic work
- Era: late 19th–early 20th century
- School or tradition: Neogrammarian; Junimea; Viața Românească
- Main interests: Phonology, Indo-European studies, literary criticism, aesthetics, history of Romania, literature of Romania
- Influenced: Vasile Bogrea, Dimitrie Găzdaru, Gheorghe Ghibănescu, Iorgu Iordan, Gheorghe Ivănescu, Haralambie Mihăescu, Giorge Pascu, Ioan Șiadbei

Alexandru I. Philippide (Romanian pronunciation: [alekˈsandru filiˈpide]; May 1, 1859 – August 12, 1933) was a Romanian linguist and philologist. Educated in Iași and Halle, he taught high school for several years until 1893, when he secured a professorship at the University of Iași that he would hold until his death forty years later. He began publishing books on the Romanian language around the time he graduated from university, but it was not until he became a professor that he drew wider attention, thanks to a study of the language's history. While not particularly ideological, he penned sharp, witty polemics directed at various intellectual figures, both at home and, in one noted case, in the German Empire. As a conservative who rallied with the Junimea club, Philippide rejected didactic art and mocked its socialist patrons—though his own work had hints of socialist humanitarianism.

In 1898, Philippide began work on a Romanian dictionary; by 1906, he and his team had completed the first four letters of the alphabet before others took over the task. His advocacy of phonetic spelling was cherished by a group of writers and activists which put out Viața Românească magazine; they also shared Philippide's Germanophilia, which manifested itself in particular during the political debates that preceded Romania's entry into World War I. Unlike the other Germanophiles, Philippide spent the second half of the war at Iași, which, following a series of major defeats, endured as the capital of a rump Romanian state. His major work, which appeared in two hefty volumes in 1925 and 1928, brings together a wide range of ancient sources and linguistic evidence to analyze the ethnogenesis of the Romanians and the development of their language. Although attacked for parochialism by one set of academics, the students he trained carried forth his ideas by forming the core of an Iași-based linguistic school.

== Biography ==
=== Origins and early career ===
Philippide was born in Bârlad, Tutova County, Western Moldavia; this region is coterminous the autonomous state of Moldavia, which had joined the United Principalities during the close of 1858, shortly ahead of the linguist's birth. His father Iancu was deputy prefect of a plasă during the reign of Alexandru Ion Cuza, and owned land at Cerțești, a village to the south. Philippide was of Greek origin on his father's side, the family originating in Milies, a village at the foot of Mount Pelion in Thessaly. His great-grandfather's brother Daniel Philippidis, a historian and geographer, had settled in Iași at the turn of the 19th century. His family origins were a source of pride, even in old age: asked by Nicolae Bănescu if he was of Aromanian background, the linguist replied, "no, no, we're entirely Greek!"

Alexandru attended primary school (1866–1870) and Gheorghe Roșca Codreanu High School (1870–1877), both in his native city. After taking his baccalaureate in May 1878, he enrolled in the University of Iași, earning his degree, "with top honors", in 1881. Pursuing specialized study at the University of Halle-Wittenberg from 1888 to 1890, he took courses in classical and modern philology, archaeology and the history of Greek philosophy. While there, he met Eduard Sievers, Heinrich Keil and Hermann Suchier, becoming close friends with the latter. A librarian at the Central University Library of Iași from 1881 to 1884, he subsequently taught at the city's National College. He was hired there to fill a vacancy caused by the death of an admired teacher, Alexandru Lambrior, having received good referrals from the university, which managed the school.

Returning to teach high school after his German stint, Philippide stirred controversy as a flamboyant, unortohodox educator, relying on oratory and reading his students samples from Moftul Român, a satirical magazine. His final class included several who became figures of importance in 20th-century Romania: political activist Leon Ghelerter, journalist Emil Fagure, novelist Dimitrie D. Pătrășcanu, poet Avram Steuerman-Rodion, and an advice columnist, Doctor Ygrec. The latter recalled that Philippide, a "tiny, minuscule man", would reach greatness whenever he recited the poetry of Mihai Eminescu, managing to stir in all of them the passion for high literature.

Philippide ultimately became a professor at the literature faculty in Iași in 1893, retaining the post until his death. He was initially a substitute professor in the newly created department, rising to full professor in 1896. A Neogrammarian, he taught courses on the history of the Romanian language, general linguistics, Vulgar Latin, the physiology of the human voice and the origin of the Romanians. The initiator of an original theory of linguistics, this was developed and augmented by his student Gheorghe Ivănescu. His books, studies and articles total some 4000 pages, while his course materials number another 1500. The latter, in which he traced the history of the Romanian language, complemented his published work. It was where he tested new ideas and drafted outlines for the full-length Originea românilor. He was additionally interested in observing archeological research, especially in regard to the newly discovered Cucuteni–Trypillia culture, and encouraged Orest Tafrali to set up Iași's history museum.

=== Debut years ===
An early work by Philippide was the 1881 Încercare asupra stării sociale a poporului românesc în trecut ("Investigation into the Social Status of the Romanian People in the Past"), which attempted to trace the origins of Romanian culture. In 1882, Philippide undertook a thorough linguistic analysis to demonstrate that the Chronicle of Huru, a purported 13th-century document, was in fact a modern forgery. The piece was carried in Convorbiri Literare magazine, published by Junimea society; philologist Lucian Dumbravă sees here the core elements of his scholarship ("he is learned, thorough, authoritative [and] markedly ironic"). Philippide then authored Introducere în istoria limbei și literaturei române ("Introduction to the History of Romanian Language and Literature") in 1888 and Gramatică elementară a limbii române ("Elementary Grammar of the Romanian Language") in 1897. This was at a time when domestic scientifically composed textbooks were in scarce supply. The first work, after presenting the author's ideas on literary history, goes on to provide biographical sketches of Romanian literary figures from the 16th-century Coresi through 1821. Philippide believed that a satisfactory history of Romanian literature did not exist, and set out to correct this deficiency; according to philologist Eugen Negrici, his coverage of literary matters was below minimal, contrasting later approaches by Nicolae Cartojan (who claimed to have discovered an "old literature"). Beginning on this basis, Philippide grappled with the issue of the literary language, which he termed the "common language". Observing that Romanian had not yet developed a firm standard, he both suggested a theory of language evolution and steps to be taken toward standardization. However, he rejected wholesale attempts to create a new variant, which he accused Heimann Hariton Tiktin of doing prematurely. He ascribed overarching importance in the creation and evolution of literary languages to popular writers.

The second work, targeted at a specialist audience, was not intended as a textbook but as a means to show Romanian grammar as it existed in reality; this was in contrast with Tiktin's 1891 teaching manual. Philippide discussed words selected from the dictionary by Alexandru Cihac, the only one he found respectable; and from writers, Moldavians especially: Ion Creangă foremost, but also Eminescu, Alexandru Odobescu, Costache Negruzzi, Petre Ispirescu, Costache Conachi and Vasile Alecsandri; and from the Moldavian chronicles, as well as a bit of Anton Pann. The book features many examples of the spoken language, some of them in the Moldavian subdialect. He believed the examples would help illustrate the development of the language's inflection and syntax; this methodology is unique in the annals of Romanian grammar works. Here, he introduced the (debated) notion that the Romanian literary language was not based on a particular subdialect, but resulted from each one's contributions. While the Wallachian form was previously dominant, the increasing output of Moldavian writers meant that, by the end of the 19th century, the written language had become a compromise between the two.

It was an 1894 history of the language that put him on the academic map. Although modeled on Hermann Paul's Principles of the History of Language, it was original in scope, discussing the distinction between literary and spoken language, the causes of linguistic change, the processes that lead to literary language formation and the relation between language and orthography. In his writing, he insisted on phonetic spelling, a principle that arose not only out of his linguistic theory, but also from his study of anthropology, which led him to believe that "naturalness" should lie at the heart of language, as well as morality, society and art. However, he made one significant exception to the phonetic rule: his own surname. When asked on this point, he joked that he wished to show he had the same name as Alexander the Great, "who was himself Alexandru Philippide, that is, Alexander, son of Philip."

Philippide married twice. As a bachelor, he sought a German bride, having become convinced during his Halle days that a German woman would be ideal for him. His first wife, Johanna Minckwitz, had a doctorate in Romance philology and was the daughter of a Zürich professor. The marriage took place in a civil ceremony at Saint Helier on Jersey in early October 1895. Although initially delighted with his new wife, the relationship soured due to the presence of Philippide's mother-in-law in his house. During one heated argument, he handled an axe and Johanna took her mother's side. Eventually, the two women returned to Switzerland and the marriage ended in divorce. Johanna continued to be interested in Romanian literature, and put out her own study of Eminescu's poetry. She and Philippide reportedly had a child, although details have not survived.

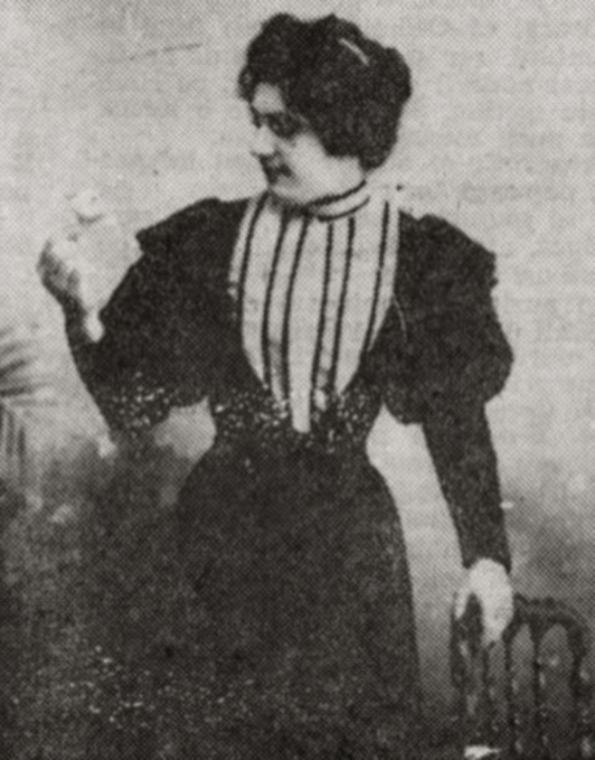
Lucreția Nemțeanu Philippide in 1899

In 1897, Philippide married a Romanian woman. This was Lucreția Nemțeanu, a young novice at Agapia Monastery, where her sister was a nun. Her father, the former mayor of Vânători-Neamț, was the administrator of the mental hospital in Târgu Neamț. He first learned of Lucreția when he saw her photograph in the hands of her brother, a student of his, and asked to meet her; a month and a half later, the two were married. This time, both a civil and a religious (Romanian Orthodox) service were held, probably at the insistence of his new in-laws. Although remarking on her "rotten poverty", he admired Lucreția's youth, beauty and kindness, considering her the opposite of Johanna. Their son, born in 1900, was the future poet Alexandru A. Philippide. The latter would recall the Spartan education received from his father, involving a strict program of Homeric verse in the original Greek.

=== Junimea and dictionary project ===
Philippide only entered Junimea in the early 1890s, during its gradual relocation to Bucharest, the national capital. He then remained in contact with the young intellectuals who still met in Iași, where Junimea maintained a nominal presence—with N. Volenti and Teohari Antonescu as mainstays. Philippide was disgusted by the provincial airs of Iași Junimism. In December 1898, he wrote a letter to Junimea founder Titu Maiorescu, telling him that his creation had "degenerated" beyond recognition: "joke has turned to buffoonery, sally to insanity, liberty to anarchy." His time at Junimea did not leave a significant impact on his thinking: it was for him primarily a means of access to high society and developing useful connections with prominent figures capable of helping him advance. Later, once he was secure in his professorship, he distanced himself from Junimism, particularly its political manifestation.

Philippide did retain something of the conservative aesthetics promoted by Maiorescu, with which his tastes and sensibilities naturally fit in. Like Maiorescu himself, he derided didacticism, "social ideals" in art, and the Marxist school of Constantin Dobrogeanu-Gherea. He detailed this hostility in his essay Idealuri ("Ideals"), serialized by Convorbiri Literare in 1892 and 1893: Philippide thought it absurd that Dobrogeanu-Gherea equated cultural heritage with socialist culture, and was infuriated by the Marxist claim that Junimea would not survive at all in cultural memory. Writing from a Junimist standpoint, he opined that a writer must take literary tradition into account, and that his writing should be devoid of moralizing. According to literary historian Z. Ornea, Idealuri is "dense, confused, and rather outside the scope of the polemic", as well as "passionately violent" in tone.

From 1900, Philippide joined the 26-man team of editors at Convorbiri Literare (a step in its ongoing transition from literary polemics to scientific publishing). In 1902, at Constantin Stere's urging, he entered the anti-Junimist National Liberal Party—but retained amiable or even friendly ties to Junimea figures, particularly Maiorescu. In line with the latter's pronouncements, he was a critic of modern, bourgeois-created Romanian society. Although nearly as vehement in this regard as Eminescu, he approached the matter not from a political angle but based on the classical morality espoused in the Nicomachean Ethics. An independent thinker and committed individualist, characterized by moral intransigence, a lucid critic of his era and of his country's negative aspects, Philippide refused to be pigeonholed into a single ideological current, thus occupying a rare position for the time. Fellow scholar Paul Zarifopol remembered him for his "permanent irritability" and "chronic indignation", which made him stand out as a Romanian answer to Gustave Flaubert. Literary scholar Antonio Patraș sees his original system as made up of tendencies normally thought of as contradictory: to his Junimist foundations were added small portions of socialist-tinted humanitarianism and nationalism in the Sămănătorist-Poporanist vein, as well as a hefty dose of German notions. As Patraș notes, they managed to form a coherent and compelling whole—lending scientific but also moral authority to his writings.

Elected a corresponding member of the Romanian Academy in 1898 and upgraded to titular member in 1900, he took part in its sessions twice, in 1910 and 1918. Philippide pursued two major tasks: the composition of a Romanian dictionary and the writing of the language's history from its origins to his day. Between 1898 and 1906, under the academy's aegis, he worked on Dicționarul limbii române ("Dictionary of the Romanian Language"), together with several students. The project was sponsored by Maiorescu, who, like Philippide, deplored the excessive tendency to ascribe Latin etymologies. He managed to write definitions for letters A through D before having to interrupt his work; the manuscript covers 11,744 folio pages. He put together a bibliography and plan for the whole dictionary and collected over 600,000 files.

Inherited from Bogdan Petriceicu Hasdeu, who offered to pass him notes, the project subsequently passed into the hands of Sextil Pușcariu. The proximate cause for the end of Philippide's involvement was that the contract had expired; however, disagreements had arisen over the years as well. The academy and King Carol wanted a normal, functional, barebones dictionary, while Philippide preferred an exhaustive compilation of the lexis, "a Littré for the Romanians" (although he eventually dropped entries on proper nouns). One of his collaborators on the project was Garabet Ibrăileanu, whom he had helped set up Viața Românească. The two shared a conservative temperament but not a similar political outlook, and Philippide took aim at the other's purported deficiencies as a philologist, seeing him as primarily a philosopher.

=== Renewed public debates ===
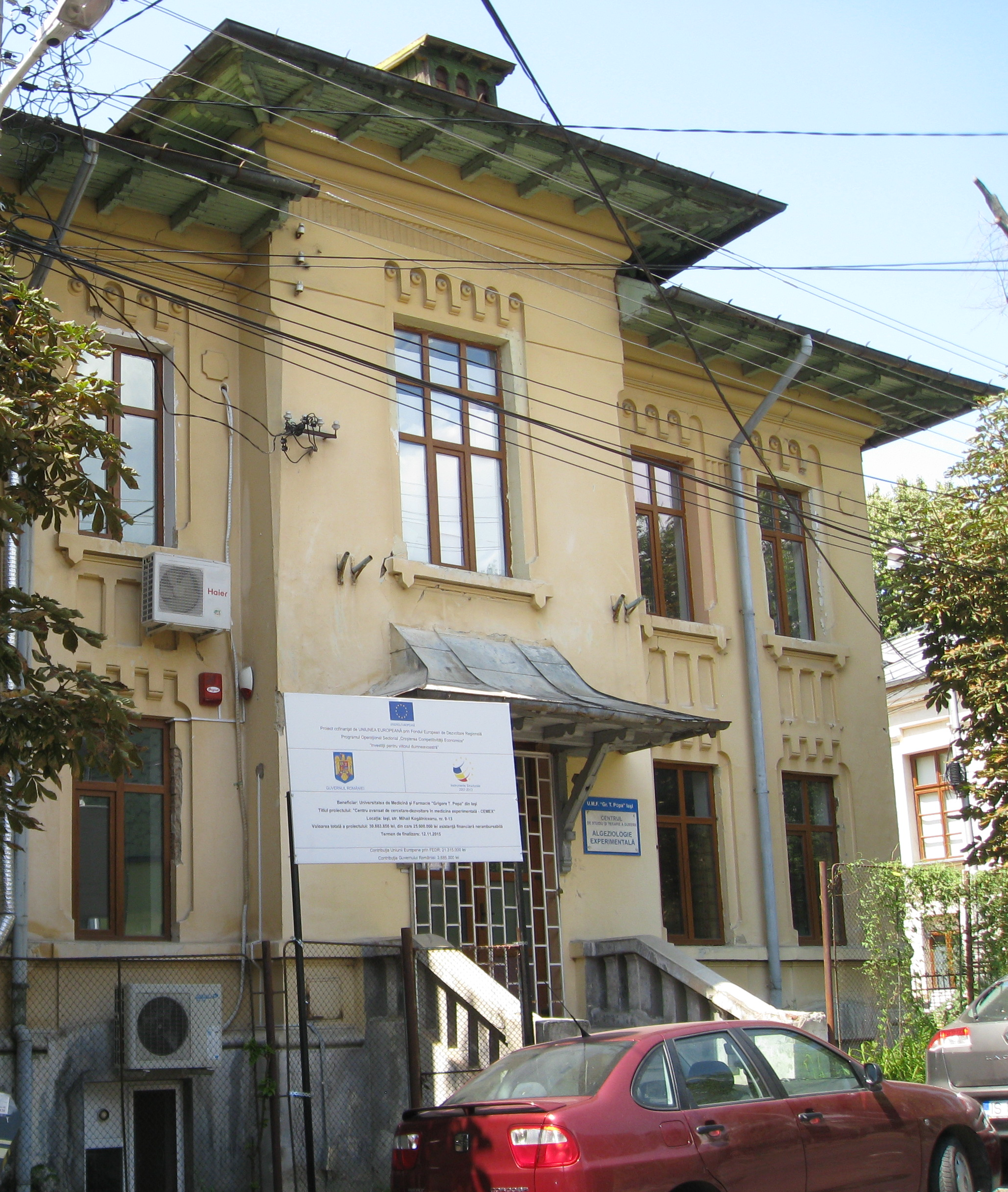
Philippide's house in Iași

Uninterested in adopting others' opinions, with a penchant for discipline and thoroughness acquired in Germany, Philippide became an adept of Stoicism, which accounts for his emphasis on ethical values, above all honesty. His devotion to plain talk sometimes caused problems in social settings. By July 1900, he was engaged in a bitter polemic with linguist Ovid Densusianu, who reportedly called Philippide "uncultured [and] dishonest". Such behavior was censured by the Junimist scholar Ioan Bogdan: though he appreciated Densusianu's scientific output, he noted a "certain enmity" toward Philippide, "one that could have been absent from what is otherwise a very serene work". Meanwhile, Philippide was holding back his critique of socialism by employing and defending his assistant lexicographer, Ioan Botez, whom the right-wing establishment had come to regard as a habitual troublemaker. Philippide was also viewed as unusually strict: in late 1902, he flunked a female student, Florica Ureche, though her graduation thesis had received good marks from three other examining professors.

Alongside Stere, Philippide was a founding member and mentor of Viața Românească magazine, which, according to his own linguistic norms, was written in conscious contrast to the official spelling directives from the academy. In his essays, which appeared in Viața Românească and in Convorbiri Literare, Philippide tried to create a model portrait of the Romanian intellectual. His writings were polemical, sharply attacking the leading figures of his time. He derided a certain type of "specialist", and insisted that intellectuals needed to focus above all on enrichment through learning. His intellectual models had both made their mark prior to Alexandru Ioan Cuza's being deposed in 1866: Timotei Cipariu and Mihail Kogălniceanu. Considering he lived in a darker age, the only later scholar he admired was Lambrior, while the quintessential "specialist" for him was Hasdeu. Philippide urged the Viața Românească journalists to write more comedy, arguing that life itself was already providing enough tragedies. One of his colleagues there, Mihail Sevastos, reports that, far from being a bookish loner, he "had a zest for life—life with all its manifestations, literary, political, social."

Analyzing Philippide's style, particularly as found in his correspondence, philologist Cristina Florescu categorizes him as a late Romantic, displaying "impetuosity, idealism, a longing for a vanished time, imprudent and abrupt gestures", his flourishes meshing with his "elevated consciousness of Romanian realities". She suggests that his spirit, in order to face a society he often shunned, took refuge in humor. His primary weapon was irony: "whether acidic or gently sentimental, frequently hilarious but even more often stinging". His blend of satire, humor and irony made for a highly specific writing style. However, as argued by his friend Gheorghe T. Kirileanu, his speeches were uplifting, "stirring up inside you, in the deepest parts of your soul, the pleasure to work and live." According to Kirileanu, Philippide was cheerful only "because he wants to make others happy"; his scatological jokes, however, were perfectly suited to annoy "the delicate aristocrats", Simion Mehedinți and Matei B. Cantacuzino.

Collections of his essays appeared as Specialistul român. Contribuție la istoria culturii românești din secolul XIX ("The Romanian Specialist. Contribution to the History of Romanian Culture in the 20th Century", 1906–1907), and as Cum se apără specialistul român ("How the Romanian Specialist Defends Himself", 1908). He also attacked German linguist Gustav Weigand in a series of articles that appeared in 1909–1910 in Viața Românească, published in 1910 in a single volume as Un specialist român la Lipsca ("A Romanian Specialist at Leipzig"). He began by defending his student Giorge Pascu, the target of a number of attacks by Weigand. Broadening the scope of his polemic, he questioned Weigand's competence as a scholar of Romanian, as well as that of other contemporary linguists. He passionately underscored what he considered Weigand's shortcomings as a person, accusing him of lacking objectivity and even of intrigue, claiming he sent letters to magazines in order to stop publication of articles by professional rivals. In tandem, he recommended Pascu for the title of docent in 1913, observing that his study of Aromanian and Megleno-Romanian was up to the most rigorous standards of academia.

=== World War ===
Like many educated Moldavians, Philippide expressed distaste for Bucharest, considering it the root of all evil. He derided the Romanian Parliament as a gathering of "wretched undertakers", and railed against the Romanian Academy, which he saw as a hastily improvised imitation of prestigious Western academies, rife with imposture and improvisation, its members concerned with getting rich quickly rather than finding comfort in the rewards of philosophy. Philippide, in common with other Junimists, deplored the French influence on Romania, believing the country needed a Germanic touch for its betterment. He was proud to live far from the hustle and bustle of Bucharest, hoping to revive the Junimea-era glories of the country's former cultural capital that he inhabited. To this end, he helped bring a superior class of students, professors, writers and artists to Iași.

Philippide made a trip to Western Europe in 1914, just as World War I was erupting—forcing his and his family's hurried return to still-neutral Romania. He then remained in Iași for the rest of his days. The trip also introduced a family crisis, since Alexandru Sr, who traveled with his father, was moved by the sights of Germany, and began writing his first works of poetry. The elder Philippide drew a sharp distinction between science, which he regarded as the province of manly, knowledge-seeking personalities; and literature, particularly poetry, which for him was an unserious activity for sensitive small minds. Although he had flirted with poetry as a young man, he was saddened to see his son adopt it as a profession. Philippide Jr nonetheless admired his father's culture. He noted that, as time went by, Alexandru Sr retained some of his literary curiosity, even to the point of following developments in literary modernism.

The aging professor, together with many other Junimists and Iași academics such as Stere, favored the Central Powers for the first two years of war, during which interval Romania was still neutral. They found themselves heckled by many of the students at Iași University, who had instead embraced the Entente cause. In February 1916, after a student strike led by Ententists Gheorghe Cuza and Grigore T. Popa, Philippide (urged on by Stere) asked for leniency toward the offenders, and advised against closing down their student clubs. The ramifications of this scandal prompted Stere to resign from his position as Rector, with Philippide assigned to take over in a caretaker's role. His cooperation with Stere deepened: also in early 1916, he supported Stere's bid to return as Rector, and ran on the same list as him. Although Philippide gathered most votes, the list overall lost as a result of government opposition and intrigue.

The "Germanophile" party lost, as, in 1916, Romania joined the Entente. In September of that year, Philippide noted that three professors had been drafted, while three others had been retained as propagandists of the Press Bureau. He demanded that at least the latter category be reinstated and "allowed to lecture in their fields." From October 1916, Philippide himself was asked to take over as professor of German literature, replacing Traian Bratu—who was by then mobilized on the front. During the German counteroffensive, which occurred immediately after, Bucharest was occupied and Iași became the provisional capital of a rump Romanian state. Between October 1916 and spring 1919, Iași University virtually ceased functioning due to the hardships of war. Its buildings were requisitioned by the War Ministry and most of the faculty were not in town. However, a few professors, including Philippide as well as Ibrăileanu and Dimitrie Gusti, were able to teach part of their course schedule inside their private homes, which were not entirely taken over by the army.

On October 9, 1918, months after Romania had made peace with Germany, Philippide was present for the first-ever session of the Romanian Academy to be hosted by Iași. In the subsequent debates, he proposed Stere, Ibrăileanu, and Ilie Bărbulescu for membership of the academy—they lost, owing to Stere's uncompromising Germanophilia. Romania's reentry into the war, superimposed with the general armistice of November 11, also allowed the Ententist side to return to power, and direct the process which formed Greater Romania. Philippide was embittered by this state of affairs. In March 1919, he publicized his thoughts on the subject of "sincere patriotism"; according to Opinia daily, he thus "silenced all of [Romania's] clownish patriots."

=== Originea românilor ===
The first volume of Originea românilor

Philippide spent the better part of his career on his second principal endeavor, a history of the language and an exploration of how it arose. He continued to work on it throughout the war, and, by his own account, had once destroyed the family piano, using a hatchet, because the music was too distracting; his passion, Sevastos reports, made him look "possessed". The resulting book was Originea românilor ("The Origin of the Romanians"). Its first, 889-page volume appeared in 1925, with the second 829-page one being published in 1928. Volume I, Ce spun izvoarele istorice ("What Historical Sources Say"), deals with the Romanians' ethnogenesis (see origin of the Romanians) and displays Philippide's abilities as an historian. He brings critical analysis to the works of Herodotus, Polybius, Appian, Strabo, Ptolemy and Cassius Dio, focusing on their writings about Dacia and the northern Balkans. The work includes long passages that had never previously appeared in Romanian. At the same time, he details the Latin inscriptions found in the Balkans, paying close attention to Procopius' De aedificiis but also to other material in the Corpus Inscriptionum Latinarum.

Philippide calculates the length and intensity of Romanization in various parts of the Balkans and documents the ethnic migrations that took place throughout the Middle Ages between the north and south banks of the Danube. Additionally, he summarizes and critiques the main theories of ethnogenesis that appeared between the Middle Ages and the beginning of the 20th century. He completely rejects the notion put forth by Austrian historian Robert Roesler that Romance-speaking people migrated into Transylvania in the 12th–13th centuries, after Magyar settlement, instead proposing a migration north of the Danube starting in the 6th century. He made a correction to the Jireček Line that was generally accepted by later linguists.

Part I of volume II is called Ce spune limba română ("What the Romanian Language Says"), and details the history of the language's phonology. Remaining a standard reference text into the 21st century, the book also includes a history of Aromanian grammar. Using the comparative historical method of the Indo-Europeanists, he reconstructs the language at its beginnings, labeling it "primitive Romanian" (see Proto-Romanian language), a dialect of Vulgar Latin. He suggests how the Eastern Romance languages were related at that point and how they broke apart into four distinct entities: Daco-Romanian, Aromanian, Megleno-Romanian and Istro-Romanian. He used Weigand's linguistic atlas of the area, as well as many other sources on the four languages. The evolution of each sound and each grammatical form in the languages is closely documented. In the second part of volume II, Ce spune limba albaneză ("What the Albanian Language Says"), he tackles the difficult question of how Romanian is related to Albanian and how this might shed light on Romanians' ethnogenesis. His conclusions retain general acceptance: that commonalities between the two languages are not due to borrowing by the ancestors of the Romanians from early Albanian, or vice versa, but arise from an ancient substrate. For Romanian, this is a pre-Roman, Thracian-Dacian-Moesian one; while for Albanian, the substrate is the Illyrian-Pannonian language.

In terms of where ethnogenesis took place, Philippide, based on historic and linguistic investigation, proposed that this happened after 268 AD in the Roman provinces south of the Danube: Pannonia Inferior, Moesia (Superior and Inferior) and Dardania, and not in Dacia Traiana. Later research using discoveries in archaeology and numismatics that had not yet been made in Philippide's day cast doubt on his hypothesis that the Roman population of Dacia withdrew south of the Danube during the reign of Emperor Gallienus. The linguistic portion of his hypothesis dealt with affrication, and he based his conclusions on the chronology of this phenomenon that was accepted in his time. Since then, a new timeline has come to be accepted. Nevertheless, Philippide was not strident in his conclusions, suggesting that a Romanized remnant stayed in Dacia even after 268, while in the parts of Romania that were not under Roman rule, there were people "not Romanized, but only Romanianized, and who live there, where they are now, since time immemorial".

=== Later life and death ===
Philippide suffered an attack of paralysis in early 1926 and developed atherosclerosis in 1931. Although he reached the mandatory retirement age in 1929, he received three successive exemptions that allowed him to remain on the faculty; as recalled by his university colleague Bratu, he continued to teach, braving both his disease and the hostility of those who resented his theories. He was instead said to have been much loved by his students. He would not grade them on their attendance, being unusually lenient in his examinations; he was now especially indulgent toward female students, but mainly because he viewed them as unscholarly ("I know that I can't ask very much of you").

At the time, Philippide's approach to literary history had been taken up by Pascu, who put out a number of textbooks, popularizing the Philippidian tenets. The two got along well, and Pascu was one of the who could still visit his doyen in his private residence. Philippide's students in those final months included a future journalist and literary historian, George Ivașcu, who reminisced in 1966:

[Philippide's course] was so rigorous that it was simply dictated to us, chapters and paragraphs and all [...]. But as soon as the text of a paragraph was thus transcribed, a veritable show of intellect began unfolding: the professor himself would comment on the issue presented by that rigid text, would highlight the various aspects, including controversies of interpretation, would hold passionate polemics with various authors, even those who had died [...]. The personality of our professor, with his vast encyclopedic culture, seemingly waiting for a chance to explode into a deluge of passion, was thus revealed to us with each new lesson, all of them in some way captivating [and] unusual.

In 1932, Philippide Jr was a proofreader and editor for Stere, who was completing his Bildungsroman, În preajma revoluției, with his own father appearing therein as "Al. Temistoclide". Philippide Sr's health plummeted upon his wife's death in March 1933 and led to his own death five months later. A note by Sevastos has it that he died "at his home on Kogălniceanu Street [of Iași], peacefully, among the trees." This claim is contrasted by a detailed reportage in Opinia newspaper, according to which his vascular disease had been aggravated by a gangrene of the leg, which the attending surgeon refrained from operating, due to Philippide's age. He he had afterwards been mostly unconscious for ten days, sometimes shouting incoherent observations about drafting a procès-verbal.

Ordinea announced that the scholar's body had been embalmed and placed in a nickel casket. The funeral service at Saint Spyridon Church, and subsequent burial at Eternitatea cemetery, were both set for August 15. The ceremony, presided upon by the Orthodox priest Ioan Țincoca, included funeral orations by sociologist Petre Andrei, who represented the Romanian government team, and novelist Mihail Sadoveanu. On that day, writer Nicolae Crevedia paid homage to Philippide as a man of unblemished reputation, and a "priest of labor", contrasting him with writers of his own, newer generation—including Crevedia himself.

The scholar left no will, leaving open the question of who would inherit his unusually vast book collection and his own unpublished works, still in manuscript. In 1927, an Institute of Romanian Philology had been set up alongside Iași University upon the initiative of Philippide and Pascu, its first director. In December 1933, four months after his death, it was named in Philippide's honor. This commemoration was marked with speeches by Bratu and Iorgu Iordan, the latter of whom argued that, as a "Moldavian scholar", Philippide had matched the status of Ion Neculce and Dimitrie Cantemir. His 1916 adversary Grigore T. Popa, who had by then become a physician and academic, covered the event in one of his articles. He reported it as "not just shameful, but a sign of disease" that, of 150 teaching staff, only twelve had ever shown up. In 1934, his department at the university was assigned to Iordan, who worked there until 1945.

== Legacy ==
Patraș observes that, during Philippide's lifetime, only Pușcariu was an intellectual rival of equal stature. The same critic argues that later on, and for mainly ideological reasons, he was ascribed an image of provincialism and extravagance bearing unjustified pretensions. The south-Danubian ethnogenesis hypothesis proposed in Originea românilor provoked long-term fury among a wide variety of nationalists (described by Patraș as uncultured); in 1940, after Northern Transylvania had been lost to Hungary, writer Ilariu Dobridor included Philippide among those Romanian scholars who, albeit patriotic in feeling, had maintained such "fog and confusion" regarding Romanian ethnic history that they had strengthened the Hungarian viewpoint. Philologists summarily dismissed Philippide's view, but, Patraș contends, only did so because of their own ethnic-based prejudices. Philippide's personal character did not help matters, with contemporaries recalling him as withdrawn, overly proud, unpredictable, cold when not aggressive during unwanted encounters. It was only in the presence of close associates or before the classroom that he let down his guard. Feared and respected by allies as well as rivals, only a relatively few followers understood and valued him. Nevertheless, these latter scholars did make use of his publications as a basis for their own research, as well as adopting the rigorous intellectual methods and persistent search for knowledge that he displayed.

Philippide's students include the main representatives of the Iași school of linguistics: Iordan, Pascu, Gheorghe Ghibănescu, Vasile Bogrea, Constantin Gălușcă, Titus Hotnog, I. N. Popovici, Ioan Șiadbei, Dimitrie Găzdaru, Grigore Scorpan, Haralambie Mihăescu and Gheorghe Ivănescu. Pascu, Ibrăileanu and Iordan took up his ideas on literary language, but it was Ivănescu who subjected them to a detailed critical analysis and developed his own theory by synthesizing Philippide's with linguistic idealism. Ion Petrovici's opening speech to the Romanian Academy in 1935 had Philippide as its theme. During the Communist period, Iordan published a biography in 1969. The latter, who retained a strong admiration for his mentor, wrote the book in response to a biography of Hasdeu published the previous year. Next came by a volume of studies that appeared in 1983 on the occasion of the semicentennial of his death, by a volume of his works the following year, and by a 1986 book recording dialogues with his contemporaries. Carmen-Gabriela Pamfil authored a 2008 biography in preparation for the 150th anniversary of Philippide's birth. In 2011, his edited course materials were published as Istoria limbii române ("The History of the Romanian Language"). Two Iași sites associated with Philippide are listed as historic monuments by Romania's Culture Ministry: his house, now a laboratory used by the city's medical university; and his grave in Eternitatea.

== Selected bibliography ==
- Încercări asupra stărei sociale a poporului român în trecut. Iași, 1881
- Introducere în istoria limbei și literaturei române. Iași, Editura Librăriei Frații Șaraga, 1888
- Istoria limbii române. Volumul întâi. Principii de istoria limbii. Iași, Tipografia Națională, 1894
- Gramatică elementară a limbii române'. Iași, Editura Librăriei Isr. Kuppermann, 1897
- Originea romînilor, vol. I. Ce spun izvoarele istorice. Vol. II. Ce spun limbile romînă și albaneză. Iași, Tipografia "Viața românească" S.A., 1925, 1928
