= George Ivașcu =

Romanian journalist and communist militant (1911–1988)

George Ivașcu (Gheorghe I. Ivașcu)
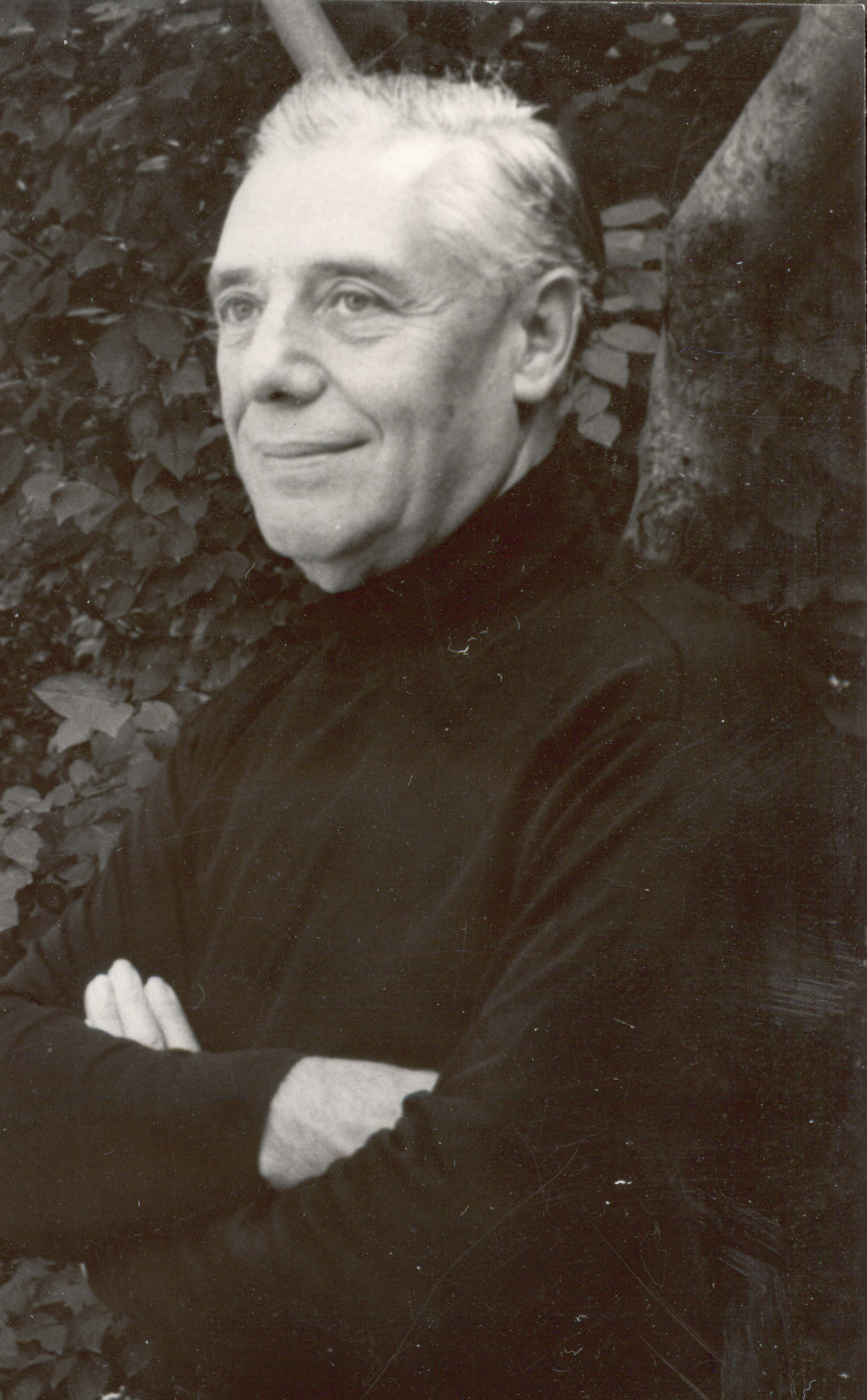
- Ivașcu in 1971
- Born: June 22, 1911; Cerțești, Galați County, Kingdom of Romania
- Died: June 21, 1988 (aged 76); Bucharest, Socialist Republic of Romania
- Resting place: Bellu Cemetery, Bucharest
- Education: University of Iași
- Occupations: Journalist; literary critic; literary historian; civil servant; university professor
- Spouse: Florica Georgescu-Condurachi
- Children: 1
- Writing career
- Pen name: Analist; Radu Costin; Victor Mălin; Dan Petrea; Paul Ștefan; Radu Vardaru
- Period: 1929–1988
- Genres: Biography; essay; reportage; journalism
- Movements: Modernism; Socialist realism Marxist literary criticism Western Marxism

Academic background
- Thesis: Istoria literaturii române, I. De la începuturi până la Junimea (1975)
- Doctoral advisor: Șerban Cioculescu

George Ivașcu (most common rendition of Gheorghe I. Ivașcu; July 22, 1911 – June 21, 1988) was a Romanian journalist, literary critic, and communist militant. From beginnings as a University of Iași philologist and librarian, he was drawn into left-wing antifascist politics, while earning accolades as a newspaper editor and foreign-affairs journalist. As editor of Manifest magazine, he openly confronted the Iron Guard and fascism in general. In the mid-1930s, he became a member of the Romanian Communist Party (PCdR), though he maintained private doubts about its embrace of Stalinism. Despite enjoying protection from the more senior scholar George Călinescu, Ivașcu was persecuted, and went into hiding, during the first two years of World War II. He reemerged as a pseudonymous correspondent, then editorial secretary, of the magazine Vremea, slowly turning it away from fascism. In parallel, he also contributed to the clandestine left-wing press and supported the resistance groups, preparing for an Allied victory.

Shortly after the pro-Allied coup of August 1944, Ivașcu was assigned to the Information Ministry, and took up work in agitprop. His career in the bureaucracy continued for a while under the communist regime (established during the early days of 1948), but Ivașcu soon after found himself exposed to accusations of perfidy, marginalized, and eventually investigated. Due in large part to a case of mistaken identity, he was prosecuted for fascism and war crimes, and spent almost five years in confinement. Released and rehabilitated by the same regime, his alleged compromises with both fascism and communism have been at the center of controversies ever since. He was also confirmed as an informant of the Securitate, which some of his fellow prisoners had always suspected.

In his later years, Ivașcu profited from liberalization and, as editor of Contemporanul, Lumea, and România Literară, allowed nonconformist talents to express themselves with confidence. He is credited with having advanced the careers of young critics such as Nicolae Manolescu, as well as with having recovered repressed authors such as Ștefan Augustin Doinaș and Adrian Marino. Ivașcu himself oscillated between national communism and Western Marxism. He took his Ph.D. with a thesis covering the entire classical period of Romanian literature, sparking polemics over its perceived endorsement of national-communist propaganda. In parallel, his tolerance of dissent irritated the regime, and Ivașcu was pushed back into accepting and even promoting communist censorship during the final two decades of his life.

== Biography ==
=== Early life ===
Born in Cerțești, Galați County, Ivașcu enlisted at the Gheorghe Roșca Codreanu High School in Bârlad. In March 1929, as a terminal year student, he published his first literary contribution: a poem titled "Reveries", in the Lugoj student magazine Primăvara Banatului. In 1930, alongside Nicolae Carandino and C. Panaitescu, he was putting out a magazine called Bis ("Encore"). Upon completing his secondary studies, Ivașcu moved to Iași, entered the local university, and graduated from its Letters and Philosophy Faculty in 1933. A librarian at his Iași faculty in 1932, he became a teaching assistant there upon graduation and until 1936, owing his appointment to professor Iorgu Iordan—and replacing Gheorghe Ivănescu, who was studying abroad. From 1935 until 1937, he was also secretary of the Institute of Romanian Philology and of its publication, which hosted Ivașcu's essays on Alf Lombard and Ion Creangă.

Influenced by the left-leaning views of his Iași professors, Ivașcu was, in 1934, founder and editor of the political review Manifest. It was here that he also had his first published piece as a literary critic: a review of Ionel Teodoreanu's novel Crăciunul de la Silvestri (also in 1934). A group of young literary aficionados and militants grew around the magazine, including, among others, Emil Condurachi and Ștefan Baciu. Its advocacy of literary modernism and its alleged "socialist-communist" tinges were censured at the time by Nicolae Iorga, the traditionalist doctrinaire and culture critic. Iorga nevertheless noted that, unlike Condurachi and the others, Ivașcu wrote "with sense".

Familie de muncitori ("A Family of Workers"), linocut by Ion Sava which first appeared in Issue 3 of Manifest (March 1935)

At Manifest, Ivașcu spoke out against the Iron Guard, a homegrown fascist movement—but, according to Iorga, did so in a "disjointed" manner. Much later in life, Ivașcu told his friends that the murder of Premier Ion G. Duca by a Guardist death squad had greatly shocked him. Several of his articles contained explicit denunciations of the Guard leader, Corneliu Zelea Codreanu, and questioned the Guardists' self-depiction as Christians. He was involved in several street battles and, in 1936, when he helped Iordan break through an Iron Guard barrage, received a rather deep cut on his cheek from shattered glass. He was also dragged into academic confrontations between the left and the right: the latter denied his application for Iorga's Romanian School in Fontenay-aux-Roses.

Under these circumstances, Ivașcu moved into far-left politics. A member of the Romanian Communist Party (PCdR), which had been outlawed by the Kingdom of Romania (according to his own testimony, he joined in 1935), he agitated in favor of prosecuted communists such as Petre Constantinescu and Teodor Bugnariu, befriending the far-left intellectual Stephan Roll. As reported in 1984 by critic and period witness Mircea Mancaș, Manifest was "directly steered by the then-illegal Communist Party, displaying a soundly anti-fascist attitude and supporting some of the working class' demands"; its "dynamic ferment, ensuring that the magazine was printed and circulated, was G. Ivașcu (assisted by Radu Paul)." In 1971, Ivașcu himself described his "meeting with the Party" as heralding his intellectual coming of age.

PCdR ideologue Lucrețiu Pătrășcanu was allegedly the behind-the-scenes figure at Manifest, directing the crew's journalistic output. Ivașcu and Pătrășcanu shared a pseudonym, Victor Mălin, which was associated with a set of articles in Manifest—including one which condemned the Italian invasion of Abyssinia. By 1936, Ivașcu's articles were also appearing in Însemnări Ieșene, a mainstream literary magazine with antifascist highlights that was put out by Mihail Sadoveanu, George Topîrceanu, and Grigore T. Popa; like the other communists, he soon found himself placed under constant surveillance by Siguranța policemen. As he himself would later claim, he was troubled by his choices, and equally alarmed by the Great Purge that was occurring in the Soviet Union. He attributed its "monstrous crimes" to the overzealous prosecutors.

=== Iașul and Jurnalul Literar ===
In March 1938, some days after King Carol II proclaimed his authoritarian National Renaissance Front (FRN) regime, Ivașcu, Alexandru Piru and Eusebiu Camilar founded a daily, Iașul. Advertising itself as an "exact and precise" newspaper, it had a cultural program promoting "civic education" and Moldavian regionalism, and was formally managed by the violinist Mircea Bârsan. Ivașcu was the real caretaker, fixating the editorial line on the promotion of modernism. He also composed the literary supplement and theatrical column, and answered the letters to the editor. Beyond its conformist facade, which was well-appreciated by FRN officials, Iașul functioned as an antifascist mouthpiece, involved in open polemics with the far-right press. Ivașcu played a prominent part in the latter disputes, with articles he signed as Radu Vardaru; these decried in particular the importance still afforded to those intellectuals who doubled as "militants for anarchy and reaction, for the mystical chaining of human freedom".

The subsequent period marked the start of Ivașcu's close friendship with the senior literary critic George Călinescu, whose activities were carefully recorded by Iașul. Ivașcu was especially enthusiastic about Călinescu's plan to transform Iași into a Romanian cultural capital: this, he noted, was "the very reason why our paper exists." At some point before 1939, he and Iordan joined a literary society formed by Călinescu, known as Junimea Nouă ("New Junimea" or "New Youth", in honor of a 19th-century club in Iași). Upon Ivănescu's return to Iași, Ivașcu lost his university position, and taught Romanian Literature at a high school in Iași. In January 1939, he became editorial secretary at Călinescu's Jurnalul Literar. Ivașcu greatly admired Călinescu's antifascism and rationalism; however, the Siguranța reported of his debates with Călinescu, with the latter refusing to allow more communists at Jurnalul Literar. According to such sources, Călinescu feared that a left-turn would expose the magazine to attacks from the far-right. Still, Călinescu paid homage to Ivașcu as an "excellent" journalist and man of letters, with "a great devotion to a certain idea."

Reviewing the letters to the editor, Ivașcu discovered and edited for publishing the work of a literary hopeful, the 17-year-old poet Ștefan Augustin Doinaș (alongside whom he would work later in life). In August 1939, just before the start of World War II (in which Romania was still neutral territory), Piru took over Ivașcu's office at Jurnalul Literar. Ivașcu was still a contributor, and, in the magazine's final issues, took over Călinescu's own foreign policy column, "The War in Weekly Recapitulations". It was manifestly apolitical. A year later, Romania found herself trapped between the Soviet Union and Nazi Germany. By the end of 1940, she had ceded Bessarabia to the Soviet Union and relinquished Northern Transylvania to pro-Nazi Hungary. Following the bankruptcy of Jurnalul Literar, Călinescu became a regular presence in Iașul. Also in Iașul, Ivașcu wrote a foreign policy column, Situația ("The Situation"), sharply critical of the king, deploring the country's rapprochement with Nazi Germany, and praising the Western Allies. In July 1940, he found himself arrested, under official inquiry.

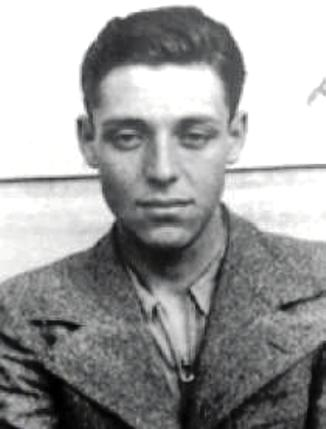
Ivașcu's mugshot, taken in or around 1940

Although described in Siguranța reports as "one of the principal communists in Moldavia region", Ivașcu was released on parole following the intervention of Călinescu, Iordan, Mihai Ralea and Petre Andrei. In September 1940, Ivașcu was allowed to resume work as chief editor of a new paper, Avântul, co-opting Camilar and Magda Isanos on his staff; censorship intervened again, and Avântul was altogether unpublished. That same month, the National Renaissance Front crumbled and the Iron Guard came to power, establishing its own "National Legionary State"—in fact an unbalanced partnership with an authoritarian Premier, Ion Antonescu. The regime immediately stripped Ivașcu of his teaching post. Following arrangements made by his in-laws, Ivașcu relocated to Bucharest, the national capital. Reportedly, he was in contact with the PCdR and its Social Democratic Party allies, who provided for Ivașcu with means to join the antifascist underground. This clandestine interval ended in November, when he was arrested by the National Legionary authorities, and interrogated for at least a month.

Upon his release, protected and housed by his brother-in-law, Colonel Zlotescu, Ivașcu requested to be integrated as a civil servant in the Propaganda Ministry. However, in his letters to Călinescu, he confessed that could not bear himself to write for any "[politically] colored newspapers". By January 19, 1941, Ivașcu had reached an agreement with the editors of Vremea, the former Iron Guard newspaper, becoming its pseudonymous foreign-affairs analyst (a parallel application at Timpul, the official newspaper, having been rejected); he was paid by the article. He took the decision only after assuring himself that "not everybody there [at Vremea] is green from head to toe" (a reference to the Guard's green flag and uniforms).

=== Anti-Soviet war ===
The historian Vasile Netea, who was one of Vremea's editors, conceded that Ivașcu showed superlative skills and, displaying a "great love" for his job, ensured that the magazine was both "substantial and varied". Using the signatures Paul Ștefan, Radu Costin, and Dan Petrea, his work originally consisted of translating articles from the foreign press, drawing maps in ink, and contributing his own pieces. These referred to such topics as the Italian Imperial consolidation, Australian participation, or the evolution of the Norwegian Campaign, and were seasoned with encoded antifascist references. He used all kinds of sources, including Radio Londres and Radio Moscow. With time, he became a cultural page editor, writing reviews of works by Alexandru A. Philippide and Mihai Moșandrei, and gazetteer entries for Ethiopian Christianity.

Ivașcu's social standing improved unexpectedly with the Iron Guard's downfall of January 21, which left Antonescu as the sole leader in national politics. Ivașcu was reintegrated in education, teaching at Gheorghe Lazăr High School and then at Spiru Haret High School. His students included Octavian Paler, himself a future journalist. As Paler recalled in 1988: "He was very elegant, wearing an impeccable suit, one which seemed to have been created by the very best tailer of Bucharest, and with all his demeanor he seemed to ooze natural, non-intrusive ease, which helped [him] impose himself on us from his desk at the back of the room, where he would sit cross-legged. He so resented the dais. [...] He was the first teacher I have heard saying: 'I myself don't understand this...' And I have to say such a bewildering statement got to me from the first moment. Here I was used to seeing teachers (not the best of them, obviously) as some kind of 'gurus' — well, not the word I would have used back then, but something of that nature."

After the attack on the Soviet Union, which sealed Antonescu's alliance with Nazi Germany, Ivașcu was drafted into the Romanian Land Forces, but, being aged 30, was ordered to continue his work at Vremea in lieu of active service. According to one account, during this short interval in the military Ivașcu wrote pro-war propaganda in the army newspapers Soldatul and Santinela. His presence in the official press became even more controversial after that date. Historian Lucian Boia identifies him behind the pen name Victor Pancu, used in articles that praise Adolf Hitler and describe Joseph Stalin's as "the most atrocious of dictatorships". With contributors such as Ion Anestin and Costin Murgescu, Vremea was a staple of anti-Soviet propaganda all throughout 1942, leading Boia to conclude that Ivașcu was playing a "double game". Diarist Pericle Martinescu also identified Victor Pancu with Ivașcu, attributing him the one-page reportage Tainele Kremlinului ("Secrets of the Kremlin"). The piece implied that Stalin was a coward, and also revisited Stalin's early life as a bank robber.

Boia's account is disputed by literary historian Nicolae Manolescu, who reports that the articles and pen name in question were those of a disgraced Iron Guard affiliate, Alexandru Gregorian. Manolescu notes that Ivașcu "was always a man of the left". This identification is supported by Pavel Țugui, the literary historian and former communist, who notes that, as Victor Pancu, Gregorian was already contributing brochures on the Soviet war crimes. In articles that can be more readily attributed to him, Ivașcu makes only minimal reference to the recovery of Bessarabia, and centers on more distant objectives, such as the Siege of Leningrad, and vaguer topics, such as the Moscow Conference. These contributions, Țugui notes, are reserved in tone, and barely conceal his hope that British forces would soon land on the Nazi-occupied continent.

As the war on the Eastern Front dragged on, Vremea grew apolitical. Its hosting of political undesirables intensified: the magazine inaugurated a "cohabitation" of the political opposites. At some point between late 1941 and summer 1942 (the circumstances are disputed), Ivașcu was appointed editorial secretary, and began signing in his own name the cultural column, critical essays, and reportage pieces from Slovakia (where he most likely traveled in mid 1942). He also kept up his foreign-affairs contributions, but used his old pseudonyms and the pen name Analist. In 1943, the Battle of Stalingrad, which Ivașcu refused to report on, put an end to the German-and-Romanian advances. Consequently, Ivașcu persuaded his boss, Vladimir Donescu, to renounce fascism for good. Vremea offered its columns to known leftists such as Călinescu, Virgil Ierunca, Ion Pas, and Radu Boureanu. Ivașcu also had contacts with the liberal Doinaș and other Sibiu Literary Circle members, whose ideas he chronicled for Vremea.

As reported by Piru, Ivașcu was also involved with another newspaper, Ecoul, nominally put out by Mircea Grigorescu. Here, he employed known leftists such as Iordan, Ovid Crohmălniceanu, and Veronica Porumbacu—alongside Piru himself. According to memoirist Niculae Gheran, this venture established another connection between Ivașcu and the Antonescu regime, since Ecoul was the "controlled opposition" (cu voie de la poliție, literally: "vetted by police"). He notes that the real person behind Ecoul was George Macovescu, at the time employed by the Propaganda Ministry—it now answered directly to Mihai Antonescu, who wanted to seem more liberal upon the end of a losing war. Gheran also reports that Ivașcu intervened to silence radical critics of the regime, withdrawing his own newspaper from circulation when it inadvertently published an epigram mocking Ion Antonescu.

=== Communist rise and imprisonment ===
Ivașcu soon attracted unwanted attention: a series of denunciations in the antisemitic newspaper Moldova brought up his collaboration to the left-wing press and his association with Jewish intellectuals. By then, Ivașcu had affiliated with the Union of Patriots, an underground organization led by Dumitru Bagdasar, and reportedly managed its clandestine newspaper, the future România Liberă. According to a passing note by Alexandru Graur, the linguist and communist militant, Ivașcu was one of the editorial team for that paper—alongside George Macovescu, Alexandru Talex, Petre Iosif-Brauchfeld, Dima Mocearov, and Graur himself. At Vremea, beginning 1944, he contributed columns that were openly critical of the "Nazi New Order", spoke favorably of the Yugoslav Partisans and the French Resistance, and noted that the war had entered its "critical phase". In the wake of the Palace Coup that toppled both Antonescus, Ivașcu published his final contributions to Vremea, including the September 6 editorial. It stated that "all good Romanians" had "shouted out their relief" at news that Ion Antonescu had been arrested.

Ivașcu soon rejoined the now-legal communist press. Following the arrival of the Allied Commission and the start of Soviet occupation, he was also integrated on the new bureaucracy, with directorial positions in the Information Ministry (heir to the wartime Propaganda Ministry). In 1945, he was applying communist censorship and introducing agitprop techniques in the field of Romanian cinema. In his official capacity at the Ministry, Ivașcu also took part in preparing a fraudulent win for the Communist Party in the 1946 election, keeping notes on the activities of dissident Social Democrats and issuing orders to restrict the activities of visiting Western journalists. With Macovescu, Pas, N. D. Cocea, Miron Constantinescu, Nicolae Carandino, and various others, Ivașcu was elected to the Committee of the Professional Journalists' Union (UZP). From 1945 to 1946, he served as editor-in-chief of Cocea's Victoria daily. This apparent reconversion irritated anti-Soviet left-wingers such as Tudor Arghezi, for whom Ivașcu was a "turncoat", deaf to "the irritating voice of truth".

According to Boia, Victoria was a nominally independent gazette, but "just as vehement as the genuine communist ones", congratulating the PCdR for its purging of Romania's monarchist elites. Formalizing its affiliation to the Union of Patriots in October 1945, Victoria signaled a definitive ideological break with Doinaș and the Sibiu Circle. Ivașcu's work, such as his 1946 homage to the socialist writer Gala Galaction, was taken up by the communist literary journal Contemporanul. Ivașcu was also a member of the Romanian Society for Friendship with the Soviet Union and prominent contributor to its magazine, Veac Nou. From 1947 to 1948, he served as head of the Propaganda Ministry's Press Directorate, during which time he was also created a Knight 2nd Class of the Meritul Cultural Order. He assisted Grigore Preoteasa in setting up the Ministry's own Disciplinary Committee, of which Ivașcu was secretary.

Despite his underground communist credentials, Ivașcu was among those who, in 1948, alongside Lucrețiu Pătrășcanu, fell out of favor with the new Communist regime. The communist party opened a file on him, comprising a psychological profile notes by Preoteasa, who called Ivașcu "characterless", "perfidious", and "a dangerous man". Ivașcu was consequently sacked from his position at the Ministry on July 22 (when he was replaced by Vasile Dumitrescu), and made Director of the Nicolae Bălcescu Museum. According to Martinescu, Ivașcu had failed to satisfy demands for politicizing his directorate—not only because he favored specialists over communist cadres, but also because he employed women in exchange for sexual favors; he had also annoyed communist potentates such as Leonte Răutu and Mihail Roller by addressing them in the first-person familiar.

The Securitate secret police kept another file on Ivașcu, investigating his Vremea work. He was erroneously identified with another Paul Ștefan, who had collaborated with the antisemitic review Sfarmă-Piatră and was the object of a national manhunt. Ivașcu was eventually arrested on March 23, 1950, and formally indicted of "crime against peace". Accounts differ as to what happened next. According to one version, he was sentenced to death, but his penalty was commuted to hard labor. Others, however, suggests that he was in fact sentenced just once, with a total penalty of five years. The verdict came despite favorable testimonies in his favor from Călinescu and his colleagues in the Union of Patriots. Witnesses for the prosecution included Iosif-Brauchfeld, who may have been persuaded that the party was always right—including in the investigation of his friend. Ivașcu's mother Maria appealed the decision and wrote letters of protest to Ana Pauker, the communist grandee, but these went unanswered.

As recorded by Martinescu in his journal, Ivașcu was presumed dead by his peers in November 1950; the same diarist later added the footnote: "No, he was just detained. He did some three years of jail time, for his 'reeducation'." At Jilava Prison, Ivașcu lectured inmates on literary subjects, speaking with passion about Călinescu and the poetry of Mihai Eminescu (whose nephew Gheorghe Eminescu was held in close proximity); he also began studying Russian and for this purpose "was followed around by a student of Russian origin". He was detained for a while in the same cell as another disgraced communist, Belu Zilber, with whom he became friends and later bitter rivals. In his account of their time together, Zilber claims that Ivașcu was being prepared as a false witness in a show trial of the former Social Democrats, including those who had aligned themselves with the PCdR. As he puts it, communist leader Gheorghe Gheorghiu-Dej "gave up on this plan. He discovered that it made more sense to appoint [the Social Democrats] as high dignitaries." Ivașcu was also cellmates with Adrian Marino, a fellow literary man and Călinescu disciple, within a cell that also housed Bessarabian inmates and militants of the Iron Guard. When Ivașcu began learning Russian with the Bessarabians, the Guardists were infuriated, and he very narrowly escaped a pummeling. Archival research carried out in 2006 indicates that Ivașcu turned informant for the Securitate, spying on his cellmates at Constanța, Jilava, and eventually Aiud.

=== Rehabilitation and Contemporanul ===
Gheran notes that one of Ivașcu's final destinations as a prisoner was a labor camp on the Danube–Black Sea Canal. He credits a rumor that other Canal inmates found out about his spying, and prepared to have him killed, but that he narrowly escaped this fate when the Securitate had him moved. Following a review of his case, Ivașcu was declared innocent and freed in 1954. As claimed by Zilber, "he proved to be an obedient fella while in prison, and the party rewarded him for it." He rejoined the teaching staff at Lazăr High School, where he remained until 1956. His skills as a propagandist were employed by the Securitate, which also contemplated keeping him as an informant in the outside world. Ivașcu's case officer described him as: "intelligent and able, may be in a position to collect intelligence from very difficult targets, his skills likely to facilitate his entrance there". Gheran found the recovering Ivașcu to be "both a victim and a ham actor", noting that he wore sunglasses inside. When asked why he did it he replied that the light upset him, after spending so much time in the darkness; as Gheran notes: "he came in from the Canal, where, if anything, he had been burnt by the sun."

Ivașcu was subsequently assigned to publishing the magazine Glasul Patriei, which was dedicated to cajoling the Romanian exiles and was officially issued in Pankow by a "Romanian Repatriation Committee". The task was unusual: Ivașcu, an antifascist and former prisoner, was working under orders from "some Securitate operative", and alongside Nichifor Crainic, the reformed far-right politico. This team focused its attacks on anti-communist intellectuals who had flirted with fascism, in particular Vintilă Horia and Emil Cioran. The next step in Ivașcu's rehabilitation was his 1955 appointment to the position of Contemporanul editor-in-chief, where he was seconded for a while by Ion Mihăileanu (later a noted screenwriter and critic of communism). Boia notes that the authorities' sudden change of heart offers a glimpse into "the impeccable communist logic"; Țugui attributes it to an intervention by his old mentor Iordan, by then a high-ranking communist, who took Ivașcu's side in Central Committee meetings.

According to Zilber, the time he had spent in prison was serendipitous, helping Ivașcu to "outdo himself". This is because Ivașcu was "a born editor": "He gets high on printers' ink, can spot a missing letter out of one thousand words, can detect a text alignment error at a glance". Ivașcu was also allowed to return to his passion for foreign politics. In September 1959, he was included by Ion Gheorghe Maurer on the Romanian delegation to the twelfth session of the United Nations General Assembly, held in New York City. In May 1958, Ivașcu published in Contemporanul a critical piece on "revisionism" as experienced by the Communist Party USA; also then, he presided over an international meeting of press reporters—which doubled as an anti-nuclear protest (held in Bucharest, it had Drew Pearson and Yannis Kapsis as guests). In August 1959, Lupta de Clasă hosted his festive essay praising peaceful coexistence, and describing the Warsaw Pact as Romania's "keystone" alliance.

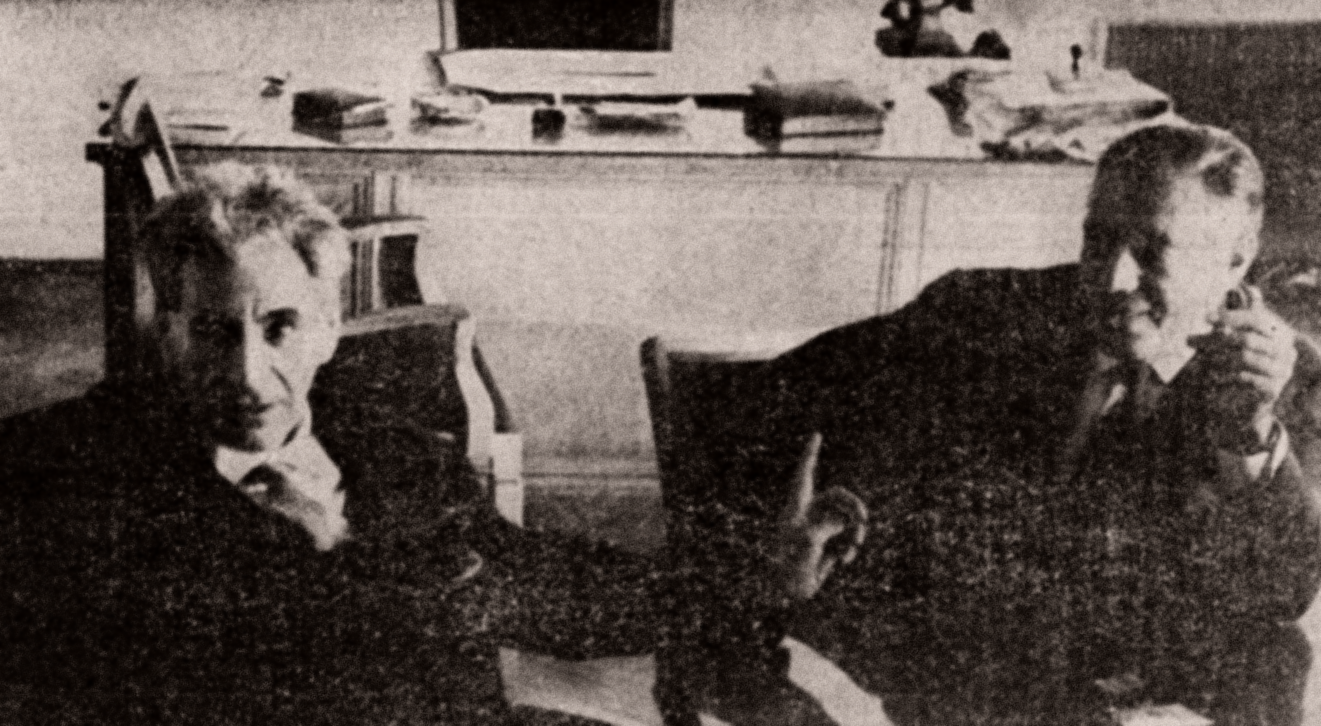
With George Călinescu at the Contemporanul headquarters, c. 1960–1965

As noted in 2006 by critic Constantin Coroiu, Ivașcu's Contemporanul was "the bridge that linked (or, one could say, salvaged) the interwar era to the contemporary era". Consecrated writers (Călinescu, Philippide, Arghezi, Lucian Blaga, Mihail Sadoveanu) were featured alongside young talents (Manolescu, Nichita Stănescu, Ana Blandiana). In addition to such work, Ivașcu inaugurated the Contemporanul "tea parties", where former prisoners such as Egon Balas could network and find protection. Ivașcu also helped Marino, his former cellmate, by having him published in Contemporanul. Nevertheless, Contemporanul maintained the status of an elite propaganda magazine. Looking back on the period, writer Gheorghe Grigurcu describes it as a collaborationist tribune, a Romanian answer to the Nouvelle Revue Française, with Ivașcu as a communist Drieu La Rochelle. Here, Ivașcu personally handled the debut of Ion Crânguleanu, who was primarily noted for exploring communist themes. In the early 1960s, official publications listed Ivașcu as one of sixteen literary critics whose work supported "socialist construction".

In 1961, Răutu, as head of the Agitprop Directorate, selected Ivașcu to oversee and preface the complete edition of Blaga's poetry. Blaga had enjoyed a precarious standing with the regime, and had basically been forbidden from publishing for some 15 years. As reported by Blaga's daughter Dorli, he was personally assigned by Răutu to look after her father, who was braving a terminal illness; Blaga "rejoiced in this, because he liked [Ivașcu] a great deal." In effect, Ivașcu acted as a censor, cutting out stanzas, destroying the inner continuity of poetic cycles, and inserting misleading critical commentary. Reportedly, he regretted his role in the affair, privately confessing that he had "exploited [Blaga's] fears and cravings".

As an official emissary of the party, Ivașcu helped coax another banished poet, Arghezi, to collaborate and adopt socialist realism. In 1969, after the poet's death, he published in Books Abroad the short essay Tudor Arghezi: Poet for Contemporary Man, praising him as "the inspired prophet", victorious "in the conflict between cognizance and noncognizance." Gheorghiu-Dej allowed Ivașcu to travel abroad in a private capacity, urging him to convince Romanian defectors and exiles, such as conductor Constantin Silvestri, to return home. According to Manolescu, Ivașcu consciously failed at this task, hinting to Silvestri that a return would not be in his best interest. As Coroiu notes, Ivașcu was personally involved in smoothing out the relationship between Contemporanul and Călinescu, whose columns were sometimes refused for publishing as politically suspect. According to Gheran, Ivașcu once refrained from publishing one of Călinescu's articles, which he read as alluding to Silvestri's defection; this soured relations between the two literary journalists.

=== University professor and Lumea editor ===
From 1958 to 1968, Ivașcu headed the University of Bucharest's History of Romanian Literature department, also directing the History of Contemporary Romanian Literature department there from 1966 to 1968. His promotion there came immediately after the resident Stalinist, Ion Vitner, had been sacked; Ivașcu was also able to employ his friend Piru as a junior professor. He worked closely with the other Călinescu disciple, Marino, and from 1963 employed Manolescu and Eugen Simion as his assistants. He helped clear Manolescu of charges that he was from a fascist family, later protecting his freedom of expression against renewed censorship. Reportedly, Ivașcu also cut off the connections between Contemporanul and a communist hardliner, Dumitru Popescu-Dumnezeu.

As his university colleagues noted, Ivașcu was a good manager of his department, one who helped the faculty as a whole, and whose arrival there helped restore "the normalcy of values". According to Gheran, Piru was especially active in defending the "controversial" Ivașcu against accusations that he was a "writer with no opus", highlighting instead his merits as a journalist and his left-wing credentials, including his "seniority in the [wartime] resistance movement." Ivașcu founded and let a literary society representing the faculty, again called Junimea. Its reopening in March 1967 was made in the presence of over 800 students; guests included young poets Ioan Alexandru, Gabriela Melinescu, Adrian Păunescu, and Gheorghe Tomozei, joined by seniors such as Doinaș, Emil Botta, and Romul Munteanu (Botta also contributed the poetry recital, alongside Carmen Galin, Aimée Iacobescu, and Florian Pittiș). The group enjoyed a flurry of activity during the later 1960s, but was virtually defunct by 1970.

Ivașcu remained at Contemporanul until 1971, while also in charge of the French-language Arcades and Revue Roumaine; he made his debut in volume form in 1966, with the collection Confruntări literare ("Literary Confrontations"). In summer 1963, with financial support from the UZP, he also founded Lumea, a magazine of international politics which gave readers an alternative to the official news. Modeled on Western news magazines, its imprimatur a sign that Gheorghiu-Dej was moving away from the Soviets, an "extensive de-Russification process". Imprimatur was therefore provided under the new guidelines of national communism, as noted by party functionary Paul Niculescu-Mizil. According to Mizil, Lumea effectively replaced a Romanian edition of Novoye Vremya, while returning to a "national line" in politics.

Ivașcu would direct Lumea to 1966. The magazine made a point of underscoring Romania's debt to Western culture, notably by publishing Marino's historical essay, Descoperirea Europei de către români ("Romanians Discovering Europe"). Probably using his contacts in the communist elite, Ivașcu managed to protect and hire at Lumea Doinaș, who was also just returning from prison. During his tenure, Ivașcu also obtained that his wartime friend Mircea Grigorescu, who had similarly passed through communist prisons, be allowed to serve as Lumea's editorial secretary. The eccentric poet-translator Mircea Ivănescu was also employed by Ivașcu as a columnist. Ivașcu asked him to fictionalize himself into an Italian correspondent, which allowed Ivănescu to study Italian politics. Similar practices were imposed on other staff members of the staff (among them Felicia Antip, Florica Șelmaru, and Cristian Popișteanu), but the magazine also hosted translations from Western intellectuals: Pearson, Art Buchwald, Sebastian Haffner, Walter Lippmann, Jean Schwœbel, and Daily Worker's John Gritten. Ivașcu still intervened to remove articles that went too far in praising non-orthodox stances, as with a 1964 piece honoring Nicolae Titulescu.

In 1964, after an eight-year wait and numerous character checks, Ivașcu was reinstated a member of the Communist Party (or, as it was known then, Workers' Party) by Gheorghiu-Dej. The ailing communist leader died in March 1965, and Ivașcu made a public show of his grief. As he recounted in 1968, he "respected and loved Gheorghiu-Dej", a "standard bearer" for the party and the writers' community. During that same interval, Ivașcu invited Călinescu to visit and lecture at his university department, thus facilitating the ailing scholar's very last meetings with young writers. In early 1965, Ivașcu was one of the few witnesses to Călinescu's death in hospital, and one of the disciples who oversaw his vigil and funeral.

He also carried on with editorial work, putting out a 1967 edition of Nicolae Filimon's 1862 classic, Ciocoii vechi și noi. It was published with Ivașcu's footnotes, which bracketed out and toned down Filimon's critique of egalitarianism. In 1969, Ivașcu clashed with his pupil Manolescu over political and literary matters: Manolescu had insisted on publishing a poetry anthology which included unfrequented anticommunists, seeing their removal from literary history as a form of induced "amnesia", which resulted in a literary void. As the volume was being withdrawn from bookstores, Ivașcu published a Contemporanul article which insisted that communist poetry was fertile enough to fill that void. According to Radio Free Europe's Monica Lovinescu, his demonstration was "long and useless". She also notes that Ivașcu's attempt to invalidate the contribution of formerly fascist poets contradicted the regime's policy of recovering them at Glasul Patriei.

=== România Literară and doctoral research ===
Under the spell of liberalization promoted by the new communist leader, Nicolae Ceaușescu, Ivașcu was free to revisit the work of his 1930s friend Pătrășcanu, who had been executed by Gheorghiu-Dej and rehabilitated since. His article on this topic, called Resurecție morală ("Moral Resurrection"), appeared as the introduction to a Contemporanul issue of May 3, 1968. Ivașcu himself became a member of the Academy of Social and Political Sciences. In 1969 and 1971, he received the Romanian Writers' Union Prize. In May 1971, he and Crohmălniceanu attended a congress of the International Association of Literary Critics, which was held at Nice. As reported by Il Dramma magazine, Ivașcu's speech on professional criticism "under pressure from the cultural industry" was "closely followed" by those in the audience.

From 1971 until his death, Ivașcu directed România Literară, the Writers' Union magazine. According to Manolescu, who was to succeed him there, the move from Contemporanul to România Literară was rather a demotion, signaling that Ceaușescu did not trust him. Others contrarily note that Ceaușescu handpicked Ivașcu to direct the magazine after the fall from favor of a previous editor, Nicolae Breban. Breban had made public his criticism of the July Theses, through which Ceaușescu had reintroduced hardline Marxism-Leninism. Ivașcu was asked to contribute propaganda editorials honoring Ceaușescu's stance—beginning with a piece celebrating the July Theses, published as an editorial in November 1971. As his colleague Mircea Iorgulescu noted, he only regarded such pieces as an "editorial task" that required his "technical skill". Other authors contrarily assess that Ivașcu had been assigned a leading role in the subsequent "cultural revolution". Media analyst Claudia Chiorean sees Ivașcu as one of Ceaușescu's "first violinists", whose bad reputation also harmed Manolescu's own. Musicologist Alex Vasiliu likewise notes that Ivașcu's arrival immediately enforced communist propaganda at România Literară, with topical contributions by Pavel Apostol, Demostene Botez, Radu Boureanu, Liviu Ciulei, and Alexandru Ivasiuc. By then, Ivașcu was making occasional returns to agitprop as film industry supervisor, this time by promoting Ceaușescu's national communism.

Ivașcu still made a point of promoting foreign literature and the more daring aspects of Romanian modernism, putting out poetry by Blandiana, Mircea Dinescu, and Ion Caraion, as well as essays by Iorgulescu and Sami Damian. At least one of Iorgulescu's contributions was directed at national-communist doctrines, and strongly critical of Păunescu (who had become the regime's official poet). The magazine also hosted debates on culture and society, and, as Manolescu writes, was "the objective ally of democratically-minded writers." With that, Ivașcu relaxed the censorship mechanisms, but the editorial staff still followed customary rules and censored themselves. Moreover, Ivașcu made it his goal to promote awareness of Romanian grammar, employing the services of linguists Alexandru Graur, Theodor Hristea, Ștefan Badea, and Alexandru Niculescu, who wrote special columns for the correction of vulgarisms.

Returning to his work in literary history, Ivașcu recovered a reassessed, unorthodox, Marxist literary criticism. As noted by a fellow researcher in the field, Z. Ornea, Ivașcu helped "restore the truth" with his biography of Constantin Dobrogeanu-Gherea (published by Editura Albatros in 1972). The following year, at Editura Politică, Ivașcu oversaw an edition of articles and speeches by the communist potentate Petru Groza. Although he had held a professorship, Ivașcu had not obtained his Ph.D., and was pressured into correcting that error. He eventually enlisted for the university's own doctoral program, with a paper on the early history of Romanian literature, and with Șerban Cioculescu as his doctoral advisor. The work, published in 1969, and echoing Călinescu's style, was saluted by the columnist at Magazin Istoric: "emerging from our epoch's burning core", the book showed that "Romanian writing has sprung up on the battlefield of independence, being conceived [...] as a wall protecting [our] national being".

Other academics gave his volume poor reviews, in particular for its political content. Ivașcu took an "ultra-orthodox" nationalist stand on Romanian language history, downplaying the contribution of Slavs; his work did not differentiate at all between religious and lay literature, formulating the claim that all ancient texts could be understood as "cultural instruments" and therefore secular in their purpose. Historian Florin Constantiniu found fault with Ivașcu's views on Romanian social history, which suggested that boyardom was already insignificant in the 17th century, and that its degeneration was recorded first-hand by Miron Costin: "Even if we were to admit that boyardom 'was living through its last moments', it could not have been aware of this supposedly looming demise".

Among the critics, Eugen Negrici notes that Ivașcu had annexed Slavonic texts to his area of study, covering up the paucity of literary sources, and had taken for granted protochronistic claims about "baroque literature" in Romania. The result, Negrici concludes, is "pitiful", the probable result of a "political command". As Niculescu notes, Ivașcu found his degree "utterly useless", being "a man of the fleeting everyday facts, of generic notes, and certainly not one to spend time documenting himself at any length." Several of his colleagues expressed concerns that Ivașcu had had his thesis ghostwritten. This perception was backed by scholar Dan Zamfirescu: in a 1993 interview, he claimed to have personally written "all the chapter on old literature, down to page 292", in exchange for 30,000 lei. Despite such controversy, Ivașcu joined a staff of writers who put out an official edition of Romanian literary history at Editura Academiei. Negrici describes the collective volume, published in 1970, as an "antiquated or, at the very least, inopportune" mixture of aestheticism and socialist realism, which unwittingly showed the limits of Ceaușescu's liberalization.

=== Final years and death ===
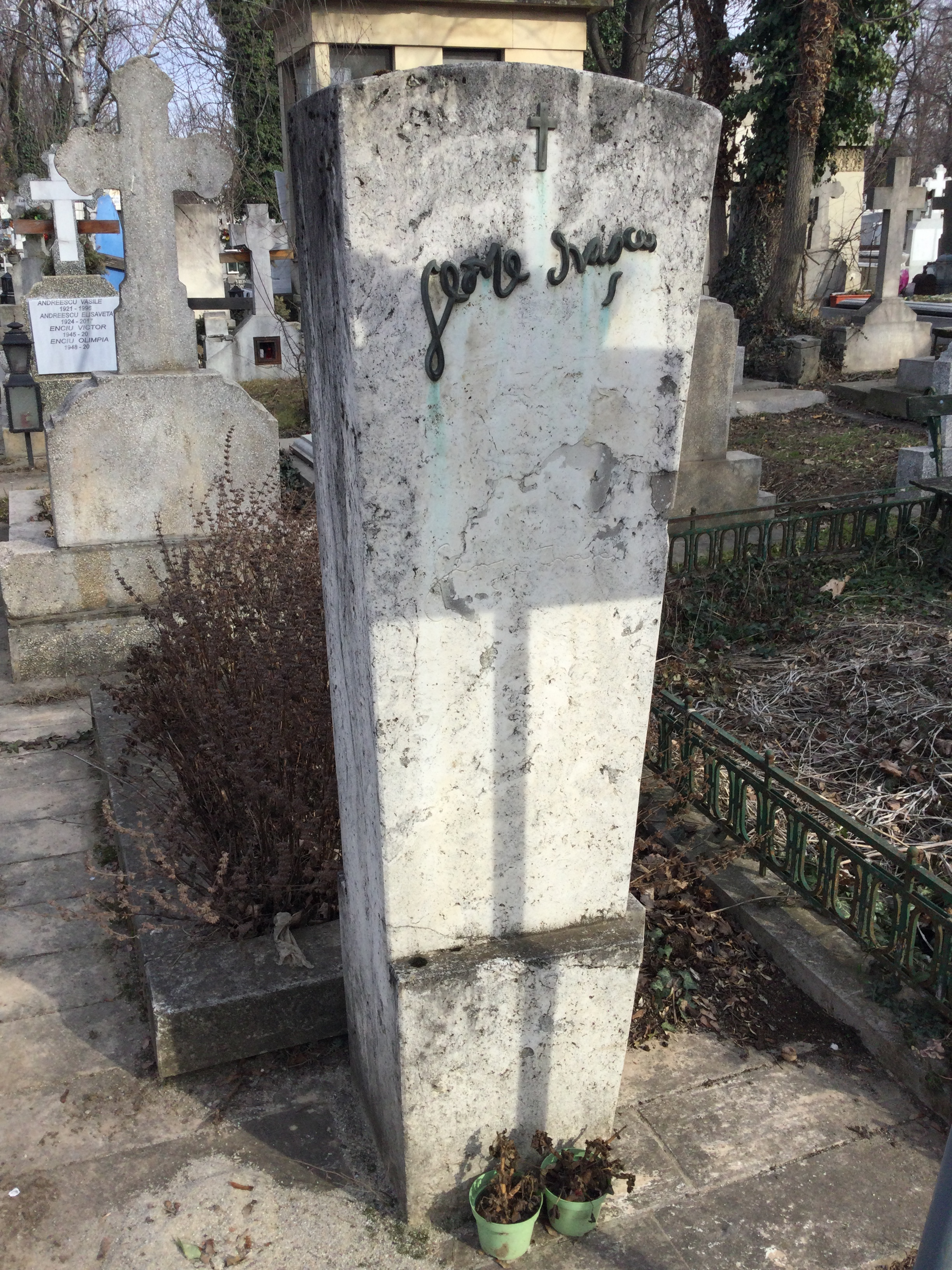
Grave at Bellu Cemetery

Living a withdrawn life from 1976, Ivașcu was described by Niculescu as a figure of the "Western left", whose personality encompassed a love for "the literary tradition" and public displays of Francophilia. A "sui generis independent", he maintained close friendships with a few like-minded literary figures who had peaked in the interwar age. Among them were Zaharia Stancu and F. Brunea-Fox; he was also personally responsible for allowing D. I. Suchianu to have his permanent film column at România Literară. In public, he was showing himself a devotee of the Ceaușescu regime—as Manolescu puts it, "he feared Ceaușescu". In mid-1974, Ivașcu appeared on Romanian Television, alongside Stancu, to discuss how "the true and exemplary builder of contemporary history is the communist man"; in 1975, he joined Mihnea Gheorghiu, Octav Livezeanu, Ștefan Voicu and other interwar communists for a collective interview, which saw print in Manuscriptum magazine. Three years later, he and Antoaneta Tănăsescu put out a 500-page anthology of antifascist works from the 1930s and '40s. He traveled freely to the West, but, as reported by exile author Sanda Stolojan, spoke admiringly of Ceaușescu's anti-Sovietism, and claimed that the anticommunist Radio Free Europe interested nobody but Romania's "old age pensioners". Stolojan wrote: "I found his cowardice fascinating. He no longer believes in anything, at his very core he just plays the regime's card."

Ivașcu and Florica Georgescu-Condurachi had one daughter, Voichița, who exhibited as a child artist in the mid-1960s. Georgescu-Condurachi fled to Paris in 1978, followed by their daughter in 1981. Subsequently, Ivașcu wrote to Ceaușescu, addressing him as "beloved conducător", in order to "disavow" his daughter's deed. According to Dinescu and historian Stelian Tănase, the letter was probably a formality, meant to ensure retention of his privileges, such as his position at România Literară. Niculescu also notes that he continued to be tortured by a parental "arduous love". In September 1983, Iași-based literary columnist Constantin Ciopraga visited Ivașcu at his home in Aviatorilor quarter, where, as he reported, the latter was living "as a loner—after a marriage in Iași, now annulled". Surrounded by his collection of modern art and Romanian icons, he worked there on each issue of România Literară was conceived, confessing: "this unsigned labor makes me feel like I'm creating [...] I don't even own a radio." Visiting Paris the following year, Ivașcu met secretly with his wife and daughter, with help from the Lebanese Embassy.

By then, the România Literară group had been subject to a clampdown and the full reintroduction of censorship; Lumea was also made to resume the party line. At around that time, writer Corneliu Vadim Tudor reported to the Securitate, accusing Ivașcu himself of "ideological subversion". In early 1985, România Literară hosted a piece by Vadim Tudor himself, lampooning Lovinescu. Upon reading this, the latter noted in her diary: "The neo-proletkult crowd are invading [that magazine] in droves, and Ivașcu is giving up ground." Some Romanian officials openly took Ivașcu's side. Macovescu, his friend at the UZP, addressed him a letter intended for publication on his 70th birthday. He noted there that Ivașcu had been made to endure "terrifying torments" by "those who believed that the new world [of communism] was their own profitable business." Around 1986, România Literară had spearheaded a campaign against the more radical forms of national-communism; Ivașcu allowed the magazine to feature an article by the more liberal communist, Gogu Rădulescu, which ridiculed the nationalists. The nationalists' reply was handled in a brochure by Iosif Constantin Drăgan, who argued that Ivașcu was an instrument of foreign enemies. It also featured letters from someone calling himself "Calafeteanu", who claimed to have known Ivașcu since his youth, and who detailed various other accusations. As noted by critic and diarist Mircea Zaciu, the letters were most likely forged by Drăgan.

Late in life, Ivașcu was tasked by the regime with editing the work of philosophers Gabriel Liiceanu and Andrei Pleșu, both of them disciples of Constantin Noica, the former political prisoner. His work was another participation in censorship: his cuts in Pleșu's text were preserved by Liiceanu as illustrations of a "pathology of culture" under communism. Ivașcu had erased all visible hint that Noica had spent time in prison. In 1992, poet and literary historian Marin Mincu similarly accused Ivașcu of silencing the more overt forms of opposition to Ceaușescu, including Mincu's own. Mincu sparked some controversy by recounting that, around 1987, Ivașcu would only tolerate anticommunists if they were "greenlit from Paris".

As recounted by his attending physician Mihai Voiculescu, Ivașcu became fatally ill with pneumonia upon visiting Warsaw in 1988. He checked himself into "some hospital" after his return home; though under medical supervision, he could no longer handle a subsequent myocardial infarction. He died in Bucharest on June 21, 1988, one and a half years before the anti-communist Revolution. In an obituary piece written by Coroiu, he is referred to as "the greatest Romanian journalist of the postwar era." By July 2006, on Ivașcu's 95th anniversary, Coroiu noted that "there is yet no reason why I should revise that claim". Among Ivașcu's former pupils, Octavian Paler remarked his "special discreetness" in all aspects of his presence, as "one of those beneficial and quiet men of value who create profound and healthy effects". His death was also marked by România Literară's adversaries at Luceafărul: in July, Artur Silvestri noted that, "in rather symbolic fashion", Ivașcu, the Moldavian, had died just days apart from Cioculescu of Muntenia and Mihai Beniuc of Transylvania. Silvestri expressed the belief that they would all be reunited in the "complete organicity" of Romanian literary culture.

== Legacy ==
Upon hearing the news of Ivașcu's death, Lovinescu recorded her feelings: "That's getting to be a catastrophe: they'll now use this to their advantage, by naming another director—and liquidating the team of [regime] critics at România Literară." However, already in July 1988, Ivașcu's colleagues on that editorial staff were taking steps toward political independence. A Securitate note on the period reported that Manolescu and Iorgulescu, together with Ion Bogdan Lefter and other writers, were seeking to commit the magazine to pure aestheticism and "reduce the political content", "as the late director would have wanted it". Liberalization efforts were rendered moot by the Revolution. In early 1990, Voichița Ivașcu signed off parts of her father's book collection to the Central University Library, which had been set ablaze during the revolutionary street battles. Alongside Blandiana, Dinescu, Manolescu, Geo Bogza, Gabriel Dimisianu, Marin Sorescu and others, she also signed her name to an open letter asking the Attorney General not to prosecute Gogu Rădulescu, whom they described as a protector of the "distinguished intellectuals, some of them dissidents". Returning to Romania some years after these events, she donated many other of her father's belongings to the Pârvan Centennial Museum of Bârlad.

The Revolution also allowed Ivașcu's work to be critically reassessed. In July 1990, journalist Bedros Horasangian included Ivașcu among the "great masters of the trade"—with Brunea-Fox, Cocea, Mircea Grigorescu, Tudor Teodorescu-Braniște, and Ion Vinea. He noted that history would eventually show Ivașcu's cultural magazines, however tinged by "official propaganda", as "nuclei which coagulated Romanian spirituality in its quest for survival." This view was contrasted by the anti-communist polemicist Paul Goma. In 1999, Goma called Manolescu a disciple of "Ivașcu, [who was] a prison snitch, a brigadier at Glasul Patriei, that organ of the Securitate [...] which forced survivors of prisons to crucify themselves on its shameful, lamentable pages".

In his 2008 book of memoirs, Dimisianu, who had served as România Literară's chief editor from 1990, made a conscious effort to restore Ivașcu's good standing in cultural memory. As Dimisianu argues, "only saints can be said to have done only good things". In a 2015 retrospective, Ceaușescu opponent Gabriel Andreescu proposed that it was "not at all surprising" for Ivașcu, Manolescu, and others to have "taken at one time or another the pill of compromises." This is because "culture is, by definition, 'creation that is shared', and therefore creation that is built, that is fashioned, by and through communication." Belu Zilber's posthumous memoirs of life in prison were ultimately published in 1991. As acknowledged by editor G. Brătescu, some of the passages relating to Ivașcu had to be cut out from the printed version, in order to avert bitter controversies.
