= Heimann Hariton Tiktin =

Romanian linguist (1850–1936)

Heimann Hariton Tiktin (August 9, 1850 – March 13, 1936), born Heimann Tiktin, was a Silesian-born Romanian linguist and academic, one of the founders of modern Romanian linguistics.

== Biography ==
Born in Breslau (part of Prussia at the time), into a rabbinic family which took its name from the shtetl of Tyktin, he was himself destined to a rabbinic vocation, and received a classical education. At the age of 18, Tiktin moved to Iaşi, where he married Amalia Mayerhoffer one year later, becoming a Romanian citizen in the early 1870s.

After having taught himself Romanian, Tiktin instructed courses in Latin, Ancient Greek and German in several of Iași's colleges (the Commercial School, the Alexandru cel Bun College, and the National Lyceum). He took active part in the cultural and scientific life of the city, and attended meeting of the highly influential Junimea circle. He became a friend of the poet Mihai Eminescu, who acquainted him with Romanian lexicography, grammar, folklore, literature and history. Tiktin's interest in Romanian language would develop into a major scientific preoccupation. He was also a friend of Nicolae Iorga and Gheorghe Kirileanu, being well acquainted with Titu Maiorescu, Grigore Tocilescu, Alexandru Philippide, A. C. Cuza, Ovid Densusianu, Alexandru Vlahuţă and Bogdan Petriceicu Hasdeu.

Tiktin received his Ph.D. from the University of Leipzig in 1884, with the thesis Studies on Romanian Philology. Beginning in 1889, he headed the linguistics section of the journal Albina.

In 1900, he converted to Christianity, taking the Christian name of Hariton. In 1904, Tiktin was appointed as a lecturer at the Humboldt University of Berlin. Two years later he founded a seminary of Romanian Linguistics inside the university, one sponsored by the Romanian state; it was the first Romanian-language teaching unit outside Romania. He returned to Romania in the late 1910s, being elected honorary member of the Romanian Academy in 1919.

Tiktin rejoined his daughter in Berlin during the late 1920s. He died there, but was buried in Iaşi.

== Work ==
Formed at the Neogrammarian School in Leipzig, Tiktin was especially interested in phonetics and grammar, which he analyzed from an historical perspective. Like his fellow Junimea members, he advocated phonetic transcription in creating the Romanian alphabet.

A frequent contributor to Junimea's Convorbiri Literare, Tiktin also published numerous studies of linguistics in other prestigious Romanian and German journals, and completed a Romanian Grammar in 1883. He was co-founder of Societatea științifică și literară (The Literary and Scientific Society) . In 1905 he published his Rumänisches Elementarbuch ("Elementary Romanian") in Heidelberg, as the first Romanian-language textbook for foreigners. He also translated works by Eminescu and Ion Creangă into German.

Tiktin's chief work is the Romanian-German Dictionary, still considered as the most authoritative work in the field. Iorgu Iordan regarded it as "the best dictionary among those ever to have been completed in our language", while Constantin Rădulescu-Motru considered that "the Tiktin dictionary is and will still remain for a long time a fundamental work". Nicolae Iorga called the dictionary "a monument of labour and intelligence".

His work is considered seminal in the fields of grammar and etymology — Eugenio Coșeriu regarded Tiktin as a precursor of structural syntax, and Marius Sala considers that Tiktin created a method in the etymological research. Iorgu Iordan considers that his work, though not very sizeable, has a "definitive character, in the sense that following research did not challenge its essence".

== Awards ==
- Special Prize of the Romanian Academy (1926)
- Golden Medal "Bene Merenti" of the Romanian Academy (1928)

== Selected works ==
- Studien zur rumänischen Philologie, I, Leipzig, 1884
- Studien zur rumänischen Philologie, II: Einfluss von ú und j auf benachbarte Laute, Leipzig, 1884
- "Der Vokalismus des Rumänischen", in Zeitschrift der Romanischen Philologie, X, (1886) p. 246–255; XI, (1887) p. 56–85; XII, (1888) p. 220–241, 436-462
- "Die rumänische Sprache", in Grundriss der romanischen Philologie, vol. I, Strassburg, 1888
- "Der Konsonantismus des Rumänischen", in Zeitschrift der Romanischen Philologie, XXIV (1900) p. 319–328, 489-500
- Rumänisch-deutsches Wörterbuch, vol. I (A – C), Bucharest, 1903
- Rumänisch-deutsches Wörterbuch, vol. II (D – O), Bucharest, 1911
- Rumänisch-deutsches Wörterbuch, vol. III (P – Z), Bucharest, 1925
