= Ilie Bărbulescu =

Ilie Bărbulescu may refer to:

- Ilie Bărbulescu (footballer)
- Ilie Bărbulescu (linguist)
