= Ilie Bărbulescu (linguist) =

Romanian philologist

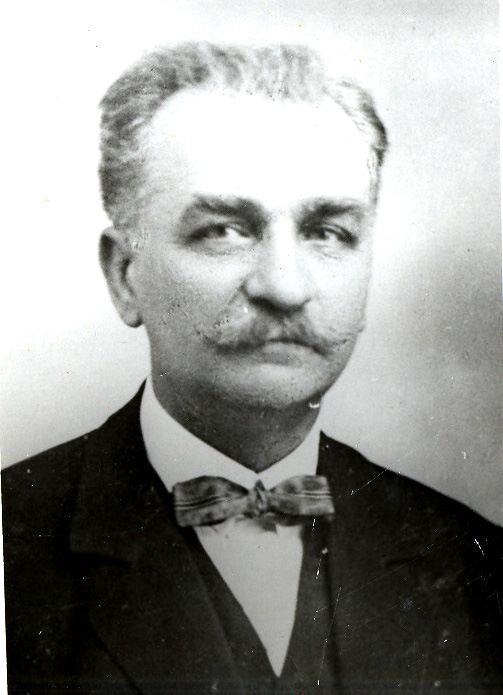
Ilie Bărbulescu

Ilie Bărbulescu (December 3, 1873 – June 5, 1945) was a Romanian linguist and philologist who specialized in the Slavic languages, also noted as a political journalist and Conservative Party cadre. Academically trained in his native country and the Kingdom of Croatia-Slavonia, he investigated in particular the Slavic influence on Romanian and the origins of Romanian literature, with additional interests in Old East Slavic and Russian literature. He was a corresponding member of the Romanian and Serbian Academies, and helped establish a Slavic studies department at the University of Iași. Bărbulescu was nevertheless a controversial figure, deeply involved in academic rivalries, and taking up unpopular political stances—especially during World War I, when, contrary to his background in Slavistics, he took up "Germanophilia", rooting for the Central Powers.

Published by Viața Romînească and Seara, Bărbulescu's political essays caused public outrage by questioning the motives of Romanian nationalists. He was largely silent after Romania declared war on the Central Powers, but returned to prominence after her surrender in April 1918. With a Germanophile triumph apparent, he was elected dean, became editor of the newspaper Iașiul, and served for several months as a Conservative in the Senate of Romania. He was demoted, and narrowly escaped being laid off, following the Armistice of November. Bărbulescu returned to his research, for which he was rewarded with a membership in the Czech Society; he was nevertheless defeated in his bid to become a full member of the Romanian Academy, attributing this failure to political resentments and a Masonic conspiracy.

== Biography ==
=== Early decades ===
Born in Bucharest, Bărbulescu attended Cantemir Vodă Gymnasium and Saint Sava National College in his native city. After graduating in 1891, Bărbulescu entered the University of Bucharest, earning a degree in history in 1895. He completed his studies of history and philology at the universities of Zagreb, Prague, Leipzig, Berlin and Vienna. He took a doctorate from Zagreb in 1899, with a specialty in Slavic languages. From 1900 to 1905, he was deputy director of the State Archives in Bucharest, publishing a number of studies, including: Cercetări istorico-filologice ("Historical and Philological Research", 1900), Studii privitoare la limba și istoria românilor ("Research into Romanian Language and History", 1902), Vechile relații ale Principatelor Române cu Croația ("Ancient Relations between the Romanian Principalities and Croatia", 1903). These were followed in 1904 by Fonetica alfabetului cirilic în textele române din sec. al XVI-lea și al XVII-lea ("Phonetics of Romanian Cyrillic in 15th- and 16th-century Texts", an expanded version of his doctoral thesis), and in 1906 by Problemele capitale ale slavisticei la români ("Key Issues in Romanian Slavistics"). Some of his voluminous essays were also taken up by the magazine Convorbiri Literare.

In 1905, he played an important role in the creation of a Slavic languages department at the University of Iași. As seen by historian Radu Mârza, he was ambitious and vain, desirous of academic promotion, and determined to eclipse his former professor, Ioan Bogdan, who held a similar post at Bucharest. (The latter always denied he competed with his former student.) Bărbulescu's objective was to secure a far more prestigious job than the one he held at the archive. He had failed to obtain a position teaching old Romanian literature at Bucharest, and Bogdan had not offered his assistance. Bărbulescu then turned his attention to Iași, probably having been informed that a discussion about a new department was underway. Around that time, as a distinguished member of the local Conservative club, he also replaced the defunct Spiru Prasin at the helm of Evenimentul newspaper. Being overwhelmed by his scholarly work, he failed to maintain its profile, and he was later replaced by Emil Severin, who in turn replaced by Rudolf Șuțu.

Following administrative procedures, Bărbulescu was named substitute professor in the new department as of October 1905. His courses, noted for their systematic approach and clarity, focused on Old East Slavic and the history of Medieval Bulgarian literature and Russian literature. He also lectured on the past and present culture of the Slavic peoples, the origin and geographic distribution of their languages. On this basis, he took a Serbophile position on the issue of Greater Bulgaria, arguing that Macedonians were the same as Serbs. In his 1905 brochure, Românii față de sârbi și Bulgari, mai ales cu privire la chestie macedo-română ("The Romanians vis-à-vis the Serbs and Bulgarians, with Special Reference to the Macedo-Romanian Issue"), he suggested that Bulgarian propaganda was working "shrewdly" against the Kingdom of Serbia—Bulgaria, he assessed, made claims that did not hold, and confounded Westerners regarding the opportunistic nature of her intentions in Macedonia.

Bărbulescu rose to full professor in November 1909, the first such professor of Slavistics at Iași. He taught in the department, part of the literature faculty, for the remainder of his career. In 1908, he was elected a corresponding member of the Romanian Academy. He had been given honorary membership in the Hellenic-Latin Society of Rome (1902), and was also enlisted by Serbia's Press Association (1909). In 1914, he became a corresponding member of the Royal Serbian Academy. The invitation to join, signed by Stojan Novaković, Ljubomir Stojanović and Aleksandar Belić, was sent to him and Bogdan in January, with the stipulation that they return an autobiography. Bărbulescu quickly did so, while Bogdan delayed until the outbreak of World War I intervened.

=== Germanophile triumph and defeat ===
Despite his high status in Serbia, at home Bărbulescu sided with the "Germanophiles", opposing Romania's entry into the war. As early as July 1914, Iași's Viața Romînească hosted an essay supporting the policies of Austria-Hungary: Greșelile curentului politic anti-austriac de la români ("Mistakes of the Anti-Austrian Current among the Romanians"); it argued that Austria was predatory, and that the Romanians from the Duchy of Bukovina lived under the comparatively liberal regime. On September 15, Bărbulescu appeared alongside Constantin Stere and Paul Bujor at a university rally which hoped to gather support for the Entente Powers. Bărbulescu sabotaged this endeavor, discussing the Central Powers as a bulwark against the "Slavic peril".

Impressed with his work, the Germanophile editors of Seara employed him as a regular contributor to 1916, and he also published, more selectively, in Bukarester Tagblatt. These contributions, written in a characteristically pedantic style, show him as a believer in the survival of Austria's ruling house, who advised Bukovinians and Transylvania to seek autonomy rather than unification with Romania; a war against the Central Powers, he argued, would mean destruction for the Romanian state. "Entirely tactless", Bărbulescu also stated the contentious claim that Austrian citizens studying in Romania were "cowards" who had fled active service and were seeking to "grow fat" in the still-neutral country. The enraged members of this community protested against him at the university.

Bărbulescu was absent from political life as Romania rallied with the Entente, and remained silent for almost the remainder of World War I. In March 1918, with Bucharest under occupation and Iași as a provisional capital, history seemed to be confirming his worries. On March 1, as most of the pro-Entente staff had left the city, the Germanophiles elected him dean of the Faculty of Letters. In April, ahead of the Romanian surrender, and with the rump country headed by Alexandru Marghiloman, Bărbulescu and Constantin Meissner were editing the Conservative newspaper Iașiul. Their assistant and art director was the draftsman Nicolae Tonitza, who complained that Bărbulescu was a disciplinarian, impossible to work with.

Bărbulescu remained there until June, during which interval he also ran as a Conservative in the legislative elections. He took a seat in Senate (Iași County Second College), and used his speaking time to attack the Ententist policies of past governments. He also caused an enduring controversy by depicting the Battle of Transylvania as an undignified way to wage war. According to his Ententist colleague Nicolae Iorga, he "simply made himself look like a fool." In October 1918, although the Entente had resumed its offensive, Germanophile Alexandru Philippide unrealistically proposed that Bărbulescu be made a full member of the academy. The same month, as he toured Bessarabia, he was reportedly "beaten to a pulp" by the Transylvanian refugees he found there.

He served as dean into 1919, by which time the Central Powers had been defeated. By March, the pro-Entente camp, led by Orest Tafrali, had resumed control of the Faculty, and was reviewing Bărbulescu's activities, to ascertain whether or not they constituted treason. Bărbulescu appeared before the review board to apologize for his remarks in Senate, and the university considered the matter settled. With Philippide, Dimitrie Gusti, Traian Bratu, Garabet Ibrăileanu and Ion Petrovici, he signed a letter of protest against attempts to curb freedom of thought, and warned about the dangers of "anarchy". Nevertheless, Constantin Angelescu, the Education Minister, asked King Ferdinand to use his prerogative, and, on March 19, Bărbulescu lost his deanship, which went to Gusti. The decree asserting this referred to his "anti-national sentiments". Tafrali then focused on getting Bărbulescu banned from teaching, but his attempts were blocked by other academics, including the moderate Germanophiles (Gusti, Philippide, Bratu, Ibrăileanu). The matter was left undecided, then forgotten.

=== Later life ===
Bărbulescu returned to his research soon after that scandal, publishing Curentele literare la români în perioada slavismului cultural ("Literary Currents among the Romanians in the Era of Cultural Slavism", 1928), Individualitatea limbii române și elementele slave vechi ("The Individual Character of the Romanian Language and Old Slavic Elements", 1929), as well as university-level courses on Slavic languages, Romanian Cyrillic, the grammar of Old Bulgarian, the history of early Bulgarian language and literature, and the history of modern Russian literature. From 1921 to 1940, when it ceased publication, Bărbulescu headed Arhiva, the journal of Iași's historical and philological society, which had been established by A. D. Xenopol. There, he published studies, articles, reviews and notes on history and philology, defended his ideas and published articles written by young colleagues from Iași. As noted by the memorist Ioan Dafin, Bărbulescu was again unable to build on his predecessors' work, turning Arhiva into his "personal review", albeit one of "cultural prestige". He also contributed to Revista pentru Istorie, Arheologie și Filologie, an academic journal which only survived to 1922.

During the early 1920s, Bărbulescu and Petrovici reconciled with Tafrali and broke with Gusti, who was now the leader of a left-wing cell in academia; they were especially focused on blocking the academic advancement of Gusti's favorite, Garabet Aslan. In 1930, Bărbulescu was unanimously voted in to serve his second term as a dean, indicating that the teaching staff no longer considered him "anti-national", nor cared about his 1918 politics. However, he revisited and defended his wartime activity in the 1932 polemic Câteva pagini de istorie contemporană ("A Few Pages of Contemporary History")—as noted by historian Lucian Boia, this "detailed and erudite" text only cemented his colleagues' enmity toward him. In the mid-1920s, with the Conservative Party dissolved, he had joined the People's Party. Alongside Petre P. Negulescu, he was one of its prominent cadres recruited from academia, and remained so until 1938.

A member of the Czech Society of Sciences (1929), and correspondent of the Slavic Institute in Prague (1931), he was proposed again for full membership of the academy in 1936, this time by Ștefan Ciobanu. The motion was defeated with opposition from Mihail Sadoveanu—Bărbulescu later claimed that this was a personal quarrel, between Sadoveanu and other Freemasons, on one hand, and himself, on the other. He retired from teaching in 1938, officially because he had reached the age limit, but in fact due to maneuvers by a group of professors centered around Sadoveanu's associate Iorgu Iordan. Bărbulescu was a wealthy man: he resided in a lavish house in Iași and had received a comfortable hotel in Sinaia as part of his wife's dowry. He spent vacations there, and derived considerable financial gain from the enterprise. He died in 1945, having spent some two years bedridden due to a long illness.
