= Lumea =

Lumea (Romanian: The World) was a monthly magazine on international politics published in Bucharest, Romania, between 1963 and 1993.

== History and profile ==
Lumea was established by George Ivascu in 1963. It is the successor of Timpuri Noi and modeled on Western magazines. At the beginning the magazine attempted to provide an alternative perspective about international politics. However, later it became a mainstream publication, being compliant to the communist regime. In 1993 the magazine folded.
