= Cerțești =

- Commune
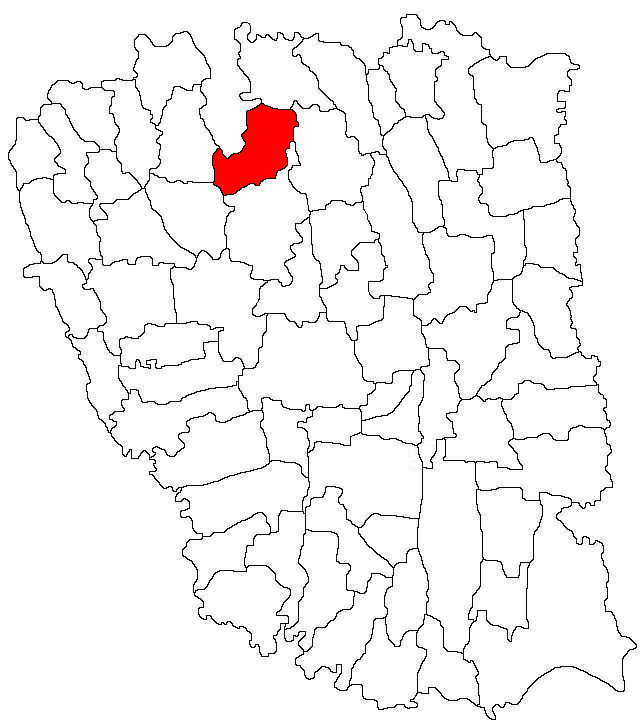
- Location in Galați County

- Location in Romania
- Coordinates: 46°1′N 27°37′E
- Country: Romania
- County: Galați

Government
  - Mayor (2024–2028): Emil Duda (PSD)
- Area: 63.72 km^{2} (24.60 sq mi)
- Elevation: 165 m (541 ft)
- Population (2021-12-01): 1,942
  - Density: 30.48/km^{2} (78.94/sq mi)
- Time zone: UTC+02:00 (EET)
  - Summer (DST): UTC+03:00 (EEST)
- Postal code: 807070
- Area code: (+40) 0236
- Vehicle reg.: GL
- Website: www.primariacertesti.ro

Cerțești is a commune in Galați County, Western Moldavia, Romania. It is composed of three villages: Cârlomănești, Cerțești, and Cotoroaia.

Historical population
Year	Pop.	±%
2002	2,547	—
2011	2,209	−13.3%
2021	1,942	−12.1%
Source: Census data

At the 2021 census, the commune had a population of 1,942; of those, 88.16% were Romanians.

== Natives ==
- George Ivașcu (1911–1988), journalist, literary critic, and communist militant
