= Traian Bratu =

Romanian philologist

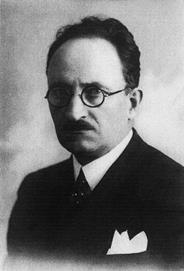
Traian Bratu

Traian Bratu (October 25, 1875 – July 21, 1940) was an Austro-Hungarian-born Romanian scholar of German language and literature. A native of the Mărginimea Sibiului region in present-day Sibiu County, southern Transylvania, he left for the Romanian Old Kingdom, where he attended university, followed up by a doctorate at the University of Berlin.

In 1907, he became a professor at the University of Iași, where he taught until his death; over time, his research interests gradually shifted from literature to linguistics. Meanwhile, he fought in World War I and twice led his university in the postwar period: in the early 1920s and during the 1930s. A left-leaning member of the National Peasants' Party, he served as president of the Romanian Senate between 1928 and 1931. He actively opposed the far-right, clashing with the followers of A. C. Cuza and with the Iron Guard; the latter organization made two unsuccessful attempts on his life.

== Biography ==
=== Origins and academic pursuits ===
Born in Rășinari, Sibiu County, in the Mărginimea Sibiului area of Transylvania, at the time part of Austria-Hungary, he grew up in a peasant family. He attended primary school in his native village, followed by the Hungarian-language state high school in Sibiu. Right after finishing high school in 1894, Bratu left for the Romanian Old Kingdom, without emigration papers. There, he studied literature at the University of Bucharest and graduated in 1898. He then taught German at a gymnasium and a seminary in Râmnicu Vâlcea between 1900 and 1902.

Bratu's presence was attested in the village of Voineasa, where, in September 1906, he became honorary president of a Reading Club, with publications that encouraged peasants to take an active part in political life. After the peasants' revolt of February–March 1907, the authorities clamped down on such activities, and the club was outlawed. He finally moved to the National College in Iași. There, his subjects were German and Latin, and he remained on the faculty until 1916. Subsequently, Bratu specialized in German studies at the University of Berlin from 1902 to 1907, earning a doctorate on the lyric poetry of Friedrich de la Motte Fouqué. In October 1907, he was hired as a professor of Germanistics at the University of Iași in Western Moldavia; he would hold this post until his death. Initially a lecturer, he rose to associate professor in 1913 and full professor in 1916. In 1909, he married Gertrud Schmidt, who was German.

At first, his academic interest tended toward literature; a volume on German language and literature in Romanian universities appeared in 1908. He was very active over the next few years, publishing a study of classical German poetry in 1909 and an analysis of Ernst Zahn's work in 1912. Moreover, in 1905, he had written a study of Friedrich Schiller's fragmentary play about Perkin Warbeck. He sent a work on the reception of popular German books to a conference at Leipzig University; this would appear in volume form in 1936. Later, his interests shifted toward linguistics. He finished a study of word order in Low German in 1934, published in Beiträge zur Geschichte der deutschen Sprache und Literatur in mid-1938. Karl Kurt Klein, a Transylvanian Saxon, was a collaborator of his at Iași from 1923; together, the two devised a new method for teaching German.

=== Wartime service and university administration ===
Although an avowed admirer of Germany, Bratu was a second lieutenant in the Romanian Land Forces, and when his country entered World War I on the side of the Allies in 1916, he served with distinction on the front. He initially saw action in August in Dobruja, after which he was advanced to the rank of lieutenant. He then fought in Moldavia, at Oituz and on the Trotuș River valley. He was demobilized in May 1918, and looked with scorn upon his pro-Allied colleagues Ioan Ursu, Orest Tafrali, and Ion Găvănescu, who spent the war in Paris advocating on Romania's behalf. After their return from France, he would clash with the latter two, who pushed for dismissing Ilie Bărbulescu from the faculty due to his "unpatriotic attitude". Together with faculty colleagues Garabet Ibrăileanu, Dimitrie Gusti, and Ion Petrovici, Bratu displayed left-wing tendencies in the war's aftermath.

Following the creation of Greater Romania in 1918, he advocated a melting pot approach toward the country's ethnic minorities, which would respect their civic rights and ensure their loyalty. This position brought him into conflict with A. C. Cuza and his disciples. He became dean of the Iași literature faculty in October 1920, and served as university rector twice: from October 1921 to December 1922 and from December 1932 to June 1938. His first term as rector ended with his resignation: an anti-Semitic student movement had gripped the university, and when protesters continued to block Jewish students from entering its buildings, he quit in protest at government inaction. His interim successor, as the most senior dean, was his nemesis Cuza.

=== Political involvement and later years ===
Bratu was a member of the National Peasants' Party (PNȚ) from March 1928. He represented his university in the Senate of Romania, serving as the body's president from 1928 to 1931. He held this office following the landslide PNȚ victory in the 1928 election, which produced the first Parliament led by that party. In 1932, he was again elected senator, this time representing Baia County. He opposed political extremism, particularly as embodied by the Iron Guard. This led to two attempts on his life, in 1936 and 1937; the latter attack left him with an earlobe cut off.

He died of lung cancer in Bucharest, although official historiography under the communist regime would assert his demise was brought on by the Guardist attacks.

== Notes ==
- Lucian Boia, "Germanofilii". Elita intelectuală românească în anii Primului Război Mondial, Humanitas, Bucharest, 2010. ISBN 978-973-50-2635-6
- (in Romanian) Cătălin Botoșineanu, "Recrutarea corpului profesoral al universității din Iași la începutul epocii interbelice. Cazul Petre Andrei", in Anuarul Institutului de Istorie "G. Barițiu" din Cluj-Napoca, tom. XLVII, 2008, pp. 219–235
- Ovidiu Bozgan, "Traiectorii universitare: de la stânga interbelică la comunism", in Lucian Boia, ed., Miturile comunismului românesc, Editura Nemira, Bucharest, 1998, pp. 309–335, ISBN 978-973-56-9209-4
- Ovidiu Buruiană, "Partidul Național Liberal în alegerile parlamentare din anul 1928", in Analele Științifice ale Universității Al. I. Cuza din Iași (serie nouă). Istorie, tomul LI, 2005, pp. 267–294
- Armand Goșu, Despre Holocaust și comunism, in Anuarul Institutului Român de Istorie Recentă, vol. I, Editura Polirom, Bucharest, 2003, 978-973-68-1205-7
- Dinu C. Giurescu, Dicționar biografic de istorie a României, Editura Meronia, 2008, ISBN 978-973-78-3939-8
- Ioan Hudiță (ed. Dan Berindei), Jurnal politic: 1 ianuarie 1940–6 septembrie 1940, Institutul European, 1998, ISBN 978-973-58-6113-1
- Irina Livezeanu, Cultural Politics in Greater Romania, Cornell University Press, Ithaca, 2000, ISBN 0-8014-8688-2
- Ion Mamina, Monarhia constituțională în România: enciclopedie politică, 1866–1938, Editura Enciclopedică, 2000, ISBN 978-973-45-0315-5
- Lucian Nastasă, Antisemitismul universitar în România (1919–1939), Editura Institutului pentru Studierea Problemelor Minorităților Naționale, Cluj-Napoca, 2011, ISBN 978-6-06-927445-3
- Apostol Stan, Iuliu Maniu, Editura Saeculum I.O., 1997, ISBN 978-973-92-1161-1
