= Iorgu Iordan =

Romanian linguist, philologist, and diplomat

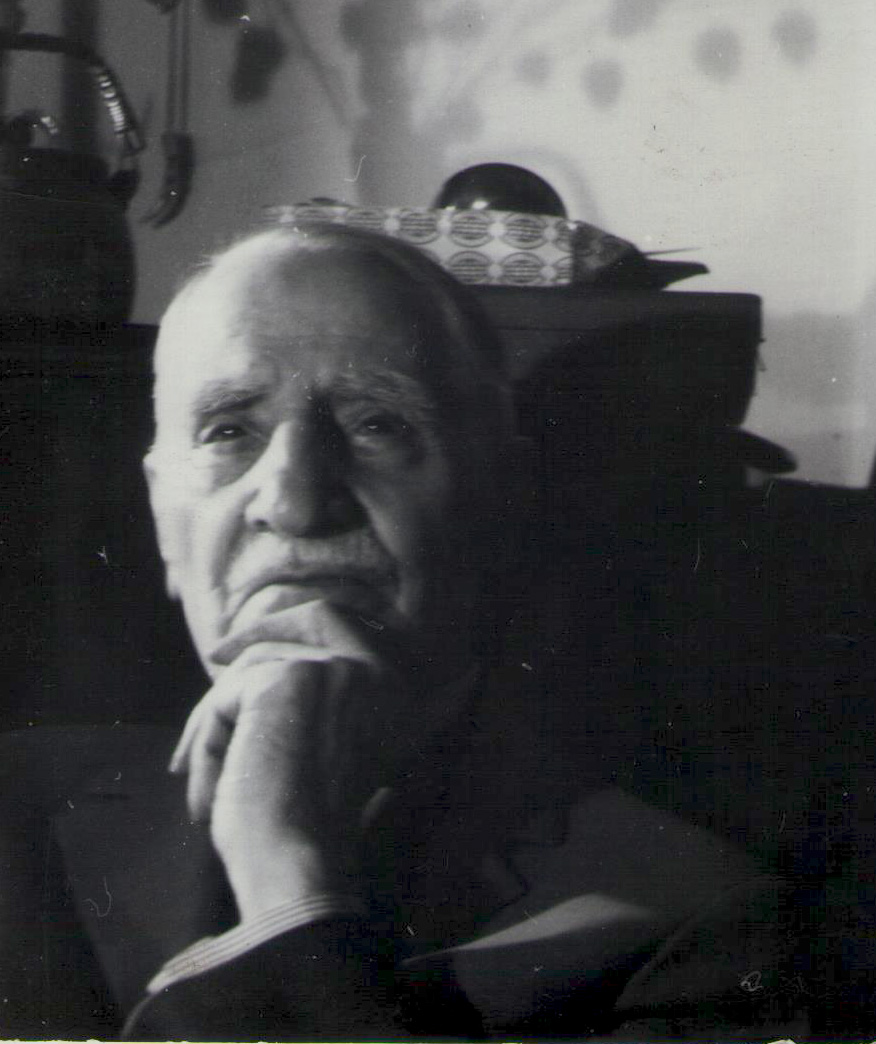
Iordan in 1980

Iorgu Iordan (Romanian pronunciation: [ˈjorɡu jorˈdan]; also known as Jorgu Jordan or Iorgu Jordan; 29 September [O.S. 17 September] 1888 – September 20, 1986) was a Romanian linguist, philologist, diplomat, journalist, and left-wing agrarian, later communist, politician. The author of works on a large variety of topics, most of them dealing with issues of the Romanian language and Romance languages in general, he was elected a full member of the Romanian Academy in 1945. He was head of its Institute of Linguistics (currently named after him and Alexandru Rosetti) between 1949 and his retirement in 1962.

He was the author of several Romanian language instruments, published under the aegis of the Romanian Academy (including Dicționarul limbii române – "Dictionary of the Romanian Language", Micul Dicționar Academic – "Concise Dictionary of the Academy" and Îndreptar ortografic, ortoepic și de punctuație – "Guide to Orthography, Orthoepy and Punctuation").

== Biography ==
Born in Tecuci to a Bulgarian father and a Romanian mother, Iordan graduated from the Costache Negruzzi Boarding High School in Iași in 1908. He completed studies of Letters, Philosophy and Law at the University of Iași in 1911 (where he attended the course on Constitutional law held by Constantin Stere) and had a few months' practice at the University of Berlin later in the same year. After World War I, he took up advanced studies in Letters at the universities of Bonn, Paris, Florence, and Rome, while completing his doctorate (1919). In Paris, he studied under the dialectologist Jules Gilliéron. Iordan also worked as a lyceum teacher in Iași and Galați, before becoming an assistant professor at the University of Iași in 1926 – a titular professor in 1927.

A Poporanist who had joined the circle formed around Viața Românească, Iordan engaged in politics during 1918, and was active, alongside Paul Bujor, Constantin Ion Parhon, Octav Băncilă, Ioan Borcea, and Nicolae Costăchescu, in the short-lived Laborer Party (Partidul Muncitor). Iordan followed it into the merger with the Peasants' Party (PȚ), and, after 1926, sat on the Left of the National Peasants' Party (PNȚ, created as the union between the PȚ and the Romanian National Party).

Four years later, he quit the PNȚ for unknown reasons, and was subsequently active in marginal anti-fascist political groupings connected with the Romanian Communist Party (PCR), encouraged by the Comintern as an effect of the Popular Front doctrine. He contributed to the leftist press, took part, alongside Petre Constantinescu-Iași and Ion Niculi, in forming the Amicii URSS ("Friends of the Soviet Union") society, and was believed by the far right to be a communist. In 1933, he was engaged in the transformation of the Teachers' Association into a trade union (during a congress in Chișinău).

He was a staunch adversary of the fascist Iron Guard, and supported Rector Traian Bratu in his confrontation with the latter. When the Guard came to power in 1940 (see National Legionary State), Iordan was subject to an inquiry, which decided in favor of his early retirement; he was reinstated in 1941, when the government was replaced at the end of the Legionary Rebellion, and, despite later claims that he was an active opponent, kept a low profile during Ion Antonescu's dictatorship (see Romania during World War II).

After Romania's withdrawal from the Axis camp and the start of Soviet occupation in late 1944, he joined the Romanian Social Democratic Party (PSD), which was falling under PCR control. He supported the eventual merger of the PSD and the PCR, and was a member of the latter after 1947, and affiliated with the Romanian Society for Friendship with the Soviet Union.

Iordan was appointed ambassador to the Soviet Union in August 1945 – during a period when left-leaning intellectuals became the predilect candidates for the diplomatic corps. He resigned in 1947, a gesture which coincided with moves by the PCR to have diplomatic offices placed under tighter political control.

Before his appointment to Moscow, Iordan was placed at the head of committees which were overseeing the purging of real or alleged pro-Nazis from educational institutions; although he faced criticism over his initial PSD affiliation (which was attributed to "his low ideological level at the time"), following the establishment of a communist regime in 1947–1948, he was engaged in a campaign to uncover and take measures against political opponents and critics of totalitarianism.

In 1946, he moved to Bucharest, and was dean of the University of Bucharest's Faculty of Letters and Philosophy (1947–1948; 1956–1957), as well as rector (1957–1958). His appointment in the capital, together with those of Andrei Oțetea and Constantin Balmuș, was in itself a measure to combat the presence of anti-communist dissidents inside the university's structure. At the same time, Iordan's admission to the academy (like those of Gala Galaction, Victor Eftimiu, Alexandru Rosetti, and Ion Agârbiceanu) was compensation for the massive purge inside the institution.

Among those whose career was affected a result of Iordan's verdicts was the writer Paul Goma (expelled from the Literature Institute for, among others, having questioned the scientific value of Moldovenism and the status of Russian as the foreign language of choice in Romanian schools). After briefly serving as head of the National Theater Iași (in 1945, during the time when it had taken refuge in Sibiu), Iordan was also present on the board of Editura Cartea Rusă, which published works of Russian literature.

In 1955, following Ion Nestor and Eugenia Zaharia's thesis regarding the Romanian specificity of the 9th–11th century Dridu culture (see Origin of the Romanians), he was appointed head of Comisia pentru studierea formării poporului român ("Committee for the Study of the Romanian People's Formation"), which signified an early move against the Stalinist rhetoric encouraged during the previous years, and an official rejection of Mihail Roller's views on the role of the Slavs in Romanian ethnogenesis. Iordan himself supported the view that Romanians had been formed both north and south of the Danube.

Iordan is buried at Bellu Cemetery, in Bucharest.

== Published works ==
- Rumanische Toponomastik, Bonn & Leipzig, Kurt Schroeder Verlag, 1924.
- Istoria literaturii italiene, Iași, Universitatea din Iași, 1928.
- Introducere în studiul limbilor romanice. Evoluția și starea actuală a lingvisticii romanice, Iași, Institutul de Filologie Română, 1932.
- Gramatica limbii române, Bucharest, 1937 (2 nd ed. 1946).
- Limba română actuală. O gramatică a „greșelilor” , Iași, Institutul de Arte Grafice „Alexandru A. Terek”, 1943 (2 nd ed. 1947).
- Stilistica limbii române, Bucharest, Institutul de Linguistică Română, 1944 (2 nd ed. 1975).
- Lingvistica romanică. Evoluție. Curente. Metode, Bucharest, Editura Academiei, 1962 (2 nd ed. 1970).
- Toponimia românească, Bucharest, Editura Academiei, 1963.
- Istoria limbii literare spaniole, Bucharest, Editura Didactică și Pedagogică, 1963.
- Introducere în lingvistica romanică, Bucharest, Editura Didactică și Pedagogică, 1965 (in collaboration with Maria Manoliu).
- Structura morfologică a limbii române contemporane, Bucharest, Editura Științifică, 1967 (in collaboration with Valeria Guțu Romalo, Alexandru Niculescu).
- Scrieri alese, Bucharest, Editura Academiei, 1968.
- Alexandru I. Philippide, Bucharest, Editura Științifică, 1969.
- Crestomație romanică, vol. I-III, Bucharest, Editura Academiei, 1962-1974 (co-ordination).
- Memorii, vol. I-III, Bucharest, Editura Eminescu, 1976–1979.
- Limba română contemporană, Bucharest, Editura Didactică și Pedagogică, 1978 (in collaboration with Vladimir Robu).
- Dicționar al numelor de familie românești, Bucharest, Editura Științifică și Enciclopedică, 1983.
- Istoria limbii române (Pe-nțelesul tuturora), Bucharest, Editura Științifică și Enciclopedică, 1983.
- Manual de linguistica romanica, Madrid, Gredos, 1989 (in collaboration with Maria Manoliu, Manuel Alvar).
