= Lucian Boia =

Romanian historian (born 1944)

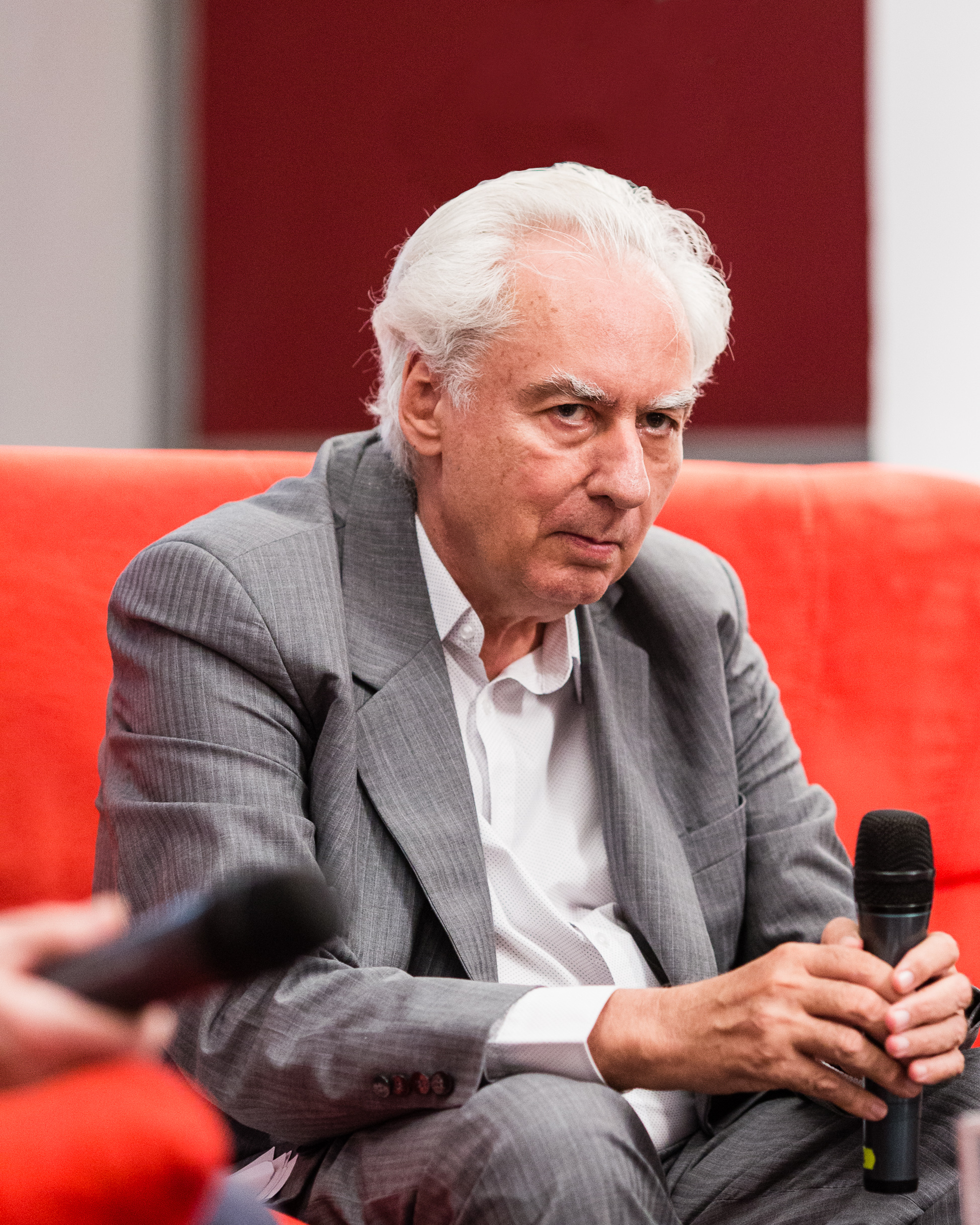
- Boia, 2019
- Born: February 1, 1944 (age 82); Bucharest, Kingdom of Romania
- Education: University of Bucharest
- Occupation: Writer
- Writing career
- Notable awards: Order of Merit of the Federal Republic of Germany; Order of Merit of the Republic of Hungary; Legion of Honour

Lucian Boia (born 1 February 1944) is a Romanian historian. He is mostly known for his debunking of historical myths about Romania, for purging mainstream Romanian history of deformations arising from ideological propaganda, and as a fighter against pseudohistory.

== Biography ==
Boia was born and raised in the Cotroceni neighborhood of Bucharest. In 1967 he graduated from the Faculty of History at the University of Bucharest, after which he was a teaching assistant and then assistant professor at his alma mater. Since 1990, he has been a professor at the Faculty of History at the University of Bucharest. He lives in the Militari district of Bucharest.

== Awards ==
- 2018 – Order of Merit of the Federal Republic of Germany, Knight rank
- 2020 – Knight's Cross of the Order of Merit of the Republic of Hungary
- 2021 – Knight of the French Legion of Honour

== Works ==
- Eugen Brote: (1850–1912) Litera, 1974
- Relationships between Romanians, Czechs and Slovaks 1848–1914, translated by Sanda Mihăilescu, Academy of the Socialist Republic of Romania Press, 1977
- L'exploration imaginaire de l'espace ['The imaginary exploration of space'], La Découverte, 1987 ISBN 2707117269
- La fin du monde ['The end of the world'], La Découverte, 1989
  - Sfîrşit ['End'], translated by Walter Fotescu, Humanitas, Bucharest, 1999
- Great Historians from Antiquity to 1800: An International Dictionary (editor-in-chief), Greenwood Press, 1989 ISBN 0-313-24517-7
- Great Historians of the Modern Age: An International Dictionary (editor-in-chief), Greenwood Press, 1991
- Mituri istorice româneşti ['Romanian historical myths'], Bucharest University Press, 1995
- Entre l'ange et la bête. Le mythe de l'homme différent de l'Antiquité a nos jours ['Between angel and beast: the myth of the different human from antiquity until today'], Plon, Paris, 1995
  - Între înger şi fiară: mitul omului diferit din Antichitate pînă astăzi, translated by Brînduşa Prelipceanu and Lucian Boia, Humanitas, Bucharest, 2004
  - Entre el ángel y la bestia, Andres Bello, 1997, ISBN 84-89691-08-8
- Miturile comunismului românesc ['The myths of Romanian communism'], Editura Universităţii din București, 1995, 1997; Nemira 1998
- Istorie şi mit în conştiinţa românească ['History and myth in Romanian conscience'], Humanitas, Bucharest, 1997, 2000, 2002
  - Történelem és mítosz a román köztudatban, translated to Hungarian by András János, Kriterion, Bucharest & Cluj, 1999
- Pour une histoire de l'imaginaire ['For a history of the imaginary'], Les Belles Lettres, Paris, 1998
  - Pentru o istorie a imaginarului, translated to Romanian by Tatiana Mochi, Humanitas, Bucharest, 2000, 2006
- Jocul cu trecutul: istoria între adevăr și ficțiune ['The past as a game: history between truth and fiction'], Humanitas, Bucharest, 1998, 2002
- Două secole de mitologie naţională ['Two centuries of national mythology'], Humanitas, Bucharest, 1999, 2002, 2005
- La mythologie scientifique du communisme ['The scientific mythology of communism'], Belles Lettres, Paris, 2000
  - Mitologia științifică a comunismului, Romanian translation, Humanitas, Bucharest, 1999, 2005
- România, țară de frontieră a Europei Humanitas, Bucharest, 2002, 2005
  - Romania: Borderland of Europe, translated by James Christian Brown; Reaktion Books, London, 2001
  - La Roumanie: un pays à la frontière de l'Europe, translated by Laurent Rossion, Les Belles Lettres, Paris, 2003
  - Rumunsko — krajina na hranici Európy, translated into Slovak by Hildegard Bunčáková, Kalligram, Bratislava, 2012
- Le mythe de la démocratie ['The myth of democracy'], Les Belles Lettres, Paris, 2002
  - Mitul democrației, Romanian translation, Humanitas, Bucharest, 2003
- Quand les centenaires seront jeunes : l'imaginaire de la longétivité de l'Antiquité à nos jours, Les Belles Lettres, Paris, 2006
  - Mitul longevității: cum să trăim două sute de ani, translated to Romanian by Walter Fotescu, Humanitas, Bucharest, 1999
  - Forever Young: A Cultural History of Longevity, translated by Trista Selous, Hushion House, 2004
- Jules Verne : les paradoxes d'un mythe ['Jules Verne: the paradoxes of a myth'], Les Belles Lettres, Paris, 2005
  - Jules Verne: paradoxurile unui mit, Humanitas, Bucharest, 2005
- L'homme face au climat : l'imaginaire de la pluie et du beau temps, Les Belles Lettres, Paris, 2004
  - Omul și clima: teorii, scenarii, psihoze, translated by Valentina Nicolaie, Humanitas, Bucharest, 2005
  - The Weather in the Imagination, Reaktion Books, 2005
- De ce este Romania altfel? ['Why is Romania different?'], Humanitas, Bucharest, 2012 ISBN 9735038382
  - Miért más Románia?, translated to Hungarian by István Rostás-Péter, Koinónia, Cluj, 2013
- Primul Razboi Mondial: controverse, paradoxuri, reinterpretari ['The First World War: controversies, paradoxes, reinterpretations'], Humanitas, Bucharest, 2014, ISBN 978-973-50-4416-9
  - Први светски рат. Контроверзе, парадокси, измењена тумачења, Belgrade, 2015, ISBN 978-86-515-1023-9
  - Der Erste Weltkrieg: Kontroversen, Paradoxa, Neudeutungen, Schiller, Bonn, 2016 ISBN 978-3-944529-78-3
- Cum s-a românizat România ['How Romania became Romanianised?'], Humanitas, Bucharest, 2015

== See also ==
- Dacianism
