= Duiliu Zamfirescu =

Romanian writer and politician (1858–1922)

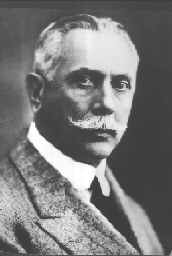
- Born: 30 October 1858; Dumbrăveni, Vrancea County
- Died: 3 June 1922 (aged 63); Agapia, Neamț County
- Resting place: Focșani cemetery
- Education: University of Bucharest
- Occupations: novelist, poet, short story writer, journalist, memoirist, politician, diplomat, lawyer, schoolteacher
- Spouse: Henrietta Allievi (died 1920)
- Writing career
- Pen name: Don Padil
- Period: 1877–1920
- Genres: fiction, lyric poetry, autobiography
- Movements: Neoclassicism, Parnassianism, Realism, Romanticism, Literatorul, Junimea

55th Minister of Foreign Affairs of Romania
- In office 13 March 1920 – 12 June 1920
- Prime Minister: Alexandru Averescu
- Preceded by: Alexandru Vaida-Voevod
- Succeeded by: Take Ionescu

34th President of the Assembly of Deputies
- In office 30 June 1920 – 22 January 1922
- Monarch: Ferdinand I
- Preceded by: Nicolae Iorga
- Succeeded by: Mihail Orleanu

Personal details
- Party: People's Party

Duiliu Zamfirescu (Romanian pronunciation: [duˈilju zamfiˈresku]; 30 October 1858 – 3 June 1922) was a Romanian novelist, poet, short story writer, lawyer, nationalist politician, journalist, diplomat and memoirist. In 1909, he was elected a member of the Romanian Academy, and, for a while in 1920, he was Foreign Minister of Romania. Zamfirescu is best remembered for his Comăneștenilor literary cycle, comprising his novels Viața la țară, Tănase Scatiu, În război, Îndreptări, and Anna.

== Biography ==
Born in Plăinești, Râmnicu Sărat County (present-day Dumbrăveni, Vrancea County), he attended elementary school and then gymnasium in Focșani. He later studied at the Matei Basarab High School in Bucharest (1873–1876), before entering the University of Bucharest's Faculty of Law. He graduated in 1880.

Zamfirescu made his debut with a series of poems in Ghimpele review (1877), and, later in the same year, became an enthusiastic supporter of the Romanian war effort during the Independence War, an experience which placed its mark on his later works and choice of subjects. Three years later, he became associated with Alexandru Macedonski's Literatorul, a circle of Symbolist writers, publishing a Romantic poem titled Levante și Kalavryta ("Levante and Kalavryta"). At the time, his work was under the influence of Macedonski's Parnassianism.

In 1880, he was appointed public prosecutor in the Northern Dobrujan town of Hârșova, while being employed, until 1884, as literary columnist for România Liberă. At the time, the editorial staff also included the writers Barbu Ștefănescu Delavrancea, Alexandru Vlahuță, and D. D. Racoviță-Sphinx. Zamfirescu contributed articles in which he declared his dislike for naturalism, as well as distancing himself from the Realism of his contemporaries Ion Luca Caragiale and Ioan Slavici (despite common perception, he claimed he had "nothing in common" with the latter two). At the time, he also contributed political articles under the pen name Don Padil.

In 1882, after briefly serving as a prosecutor in Târgoviște and resigning, Duiliu Zamfirescu moved back to Focșani, where he practiced law and was a French language substitute teacher. Later in the same year, he settled in Bucharest and joined România Liberă's editorial staff, publishing his first volume of prose and poems, Fără titlu ("Untitled"), in 1883. Zamfirescu authored his debut novel, În fața vieții ("Facing Life") in 1884—the work was noted for the chapter "Pesimistul de la Soleni" ("The Pessimist of Soleni"), a satire of the Russian-born socialist thinker Constantin Dobrogeanu-Gherea.

In 1885, he came out first in an examination for the office of legation Attaché, and was consequently employed by the Ministry of Foreign Affairs, while at the same time teaching the Romanian language at the Sf. Gheorghe High School. He also began associating with the Junimea circle and began writing for its magazine, Convorbiri Literare, bringing his writings to the attention of Titu Maiorescu, while becoming a regular in the literary circle formed around the restaurant Casa Capșa. He was part of a small group of literary figures who oscillated between Literatorul and Maiorescu's circle—others to do so were Vasile Alecsandri, Veronica Micle and Matilda Cugler-Poni. The first of his poems to be published with Maiorescu's approval was titled Iarna ("Winter")—printed in June 1884. Zamfirescu is considered one of the most important writers to have been associated with Junimea during the final stage of its existence. He nonetheless maintained some distance to the society, and reportedly irritated Titu Maiorescu by collaborating with the newly established anti-Junimist magazines Literatură și Artă Română (edited by N. Petrașcu, on whom Zamfirescu was to be an influence, and Dimitrie C. Ollănescu-Ascanio).

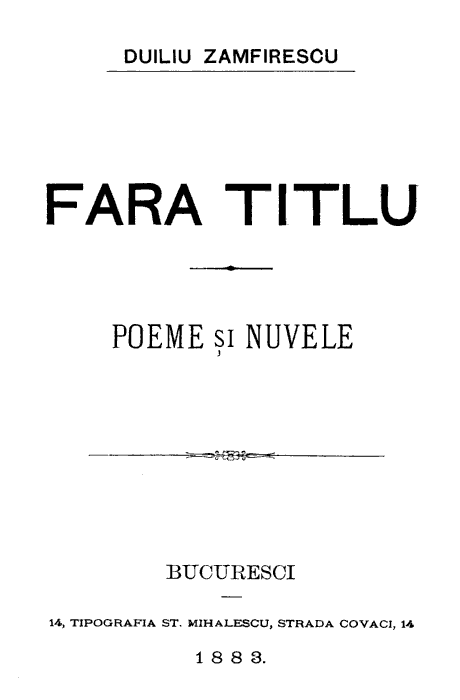
First page of Fără titlu, poeme și nuvele, 1883

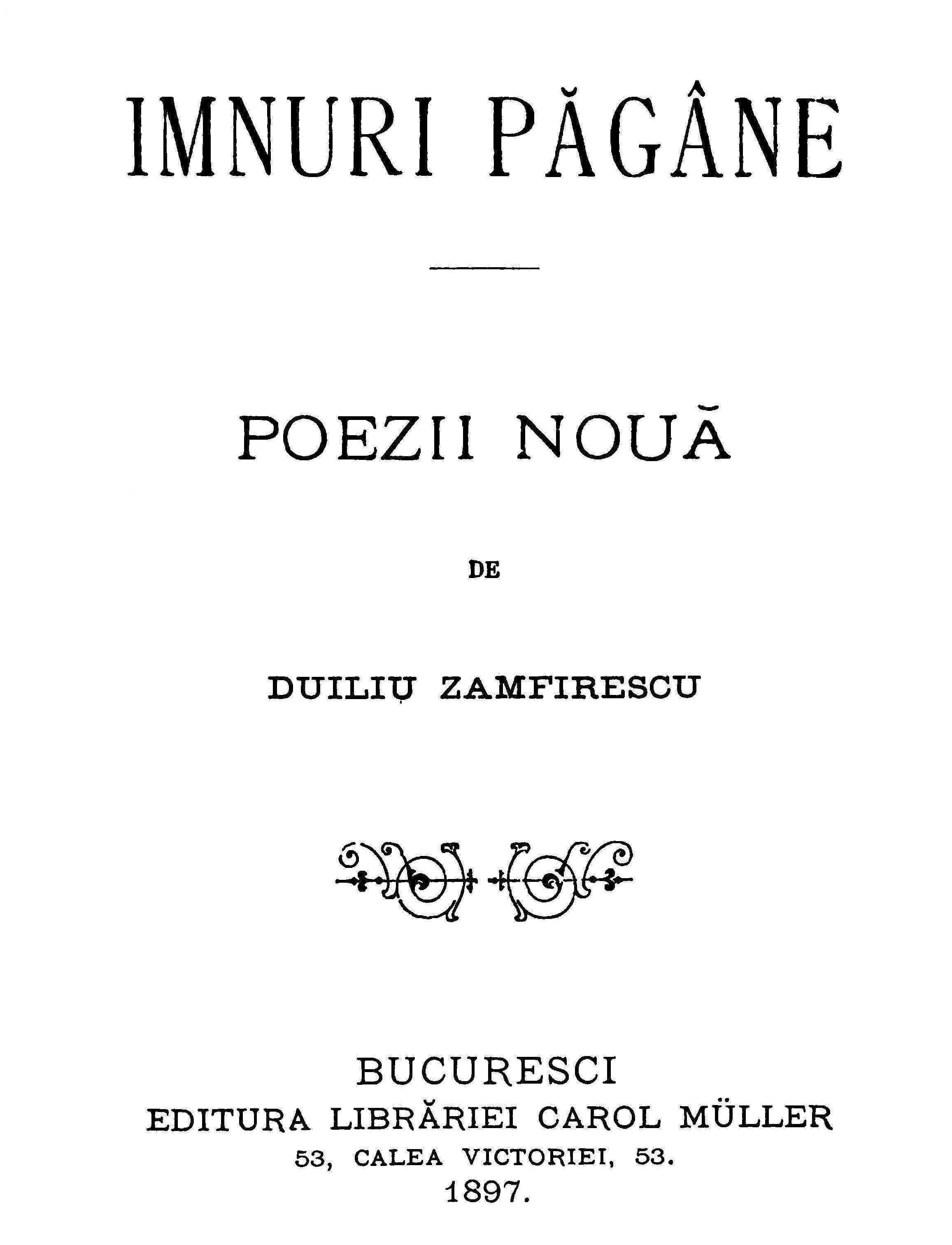
First page of Imnuri păgâne, poezii nouă, 1897

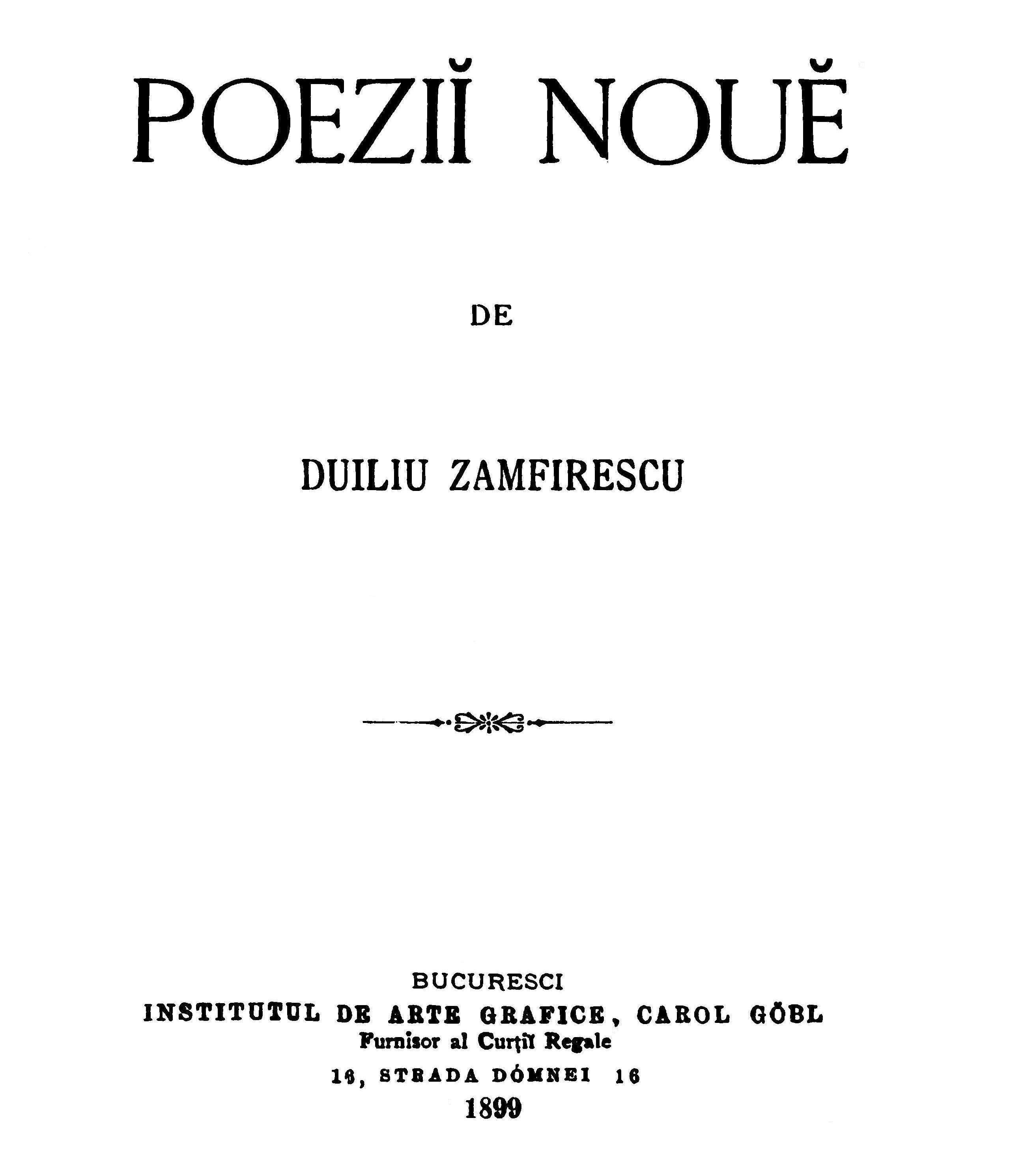
First page of Poezii nouă, 1899

Ultimately, in May 1885, Zamfirescu was dispatched to Italy, as legation secretary in Rome, a position which he filled until 1906, with a hiatus (1892–1894) during which he was assigned to Greece and later Belgium. He was a colleague of Dimitrie Ghyka, and remembered for welcoming the ethnic Romanian Transylvanian activist Badea Cârțan during the latter's celebrated trip to the Italian capital (1896). Zamfirescu married an Italian woman, Henrietta Allievi, who died in 1920.

An enthusiastic admirer of Leo Tolstoy's writings, he began work on a monograph entirely dedicated to the latter (excerpts of which were first published in 1892 issues of Convorbiri Literare). With his 1894 volume of poetry Alte orizonturi ("Other Horizons"), Zamfirescu entered a prolific phase of his literary career: in 1894–1895, Convorbiri Literare serialized his novel Viața la țară ("Life in the Country"), followed in 1895–1896 by Tănase Scatiu, and, in 1897–1898, În război ("At War"); in 1895, he also published his collected novellas (Nuvele romane, "Roman Novellas"), followed by the poetry volumes Imnuri păgâne ("Pagan Hymns", 1897), and Poezii nouă ("New Poems", 1899).

His relations with Dobrogeanu-Gherea was tense, but, in 1890, Zamfirescu approved of the decision taken by the Theodor Rosetti cabinet to award the Romanian citizenship to the philosopher (at a time when his Jewish ethnicity would have made it extremely hard to obtain). The same year, Dobrogeanu-Gherea published a study of Zamfirescu's works. The two opposed each other over economic ideas and Dobrogeanu-Gherea's application of Marxism to the Romanian society—examining the works of Achille Loria, Zamfirescu collected Marxist-inspired notions that, he believed, contradicted Dobrogeanu-Gherea from inside his own camp. When Maiorescu and the Romanian Marxists were engaged in a lengthy polemic, he added his own arguments in support of the former.

In 1899, Zamfirescu wrote a poem about Bukovina that was inspired by Mihai Eminescu's Doina. Between 1901 and 1902, his novel Îndreptări ("Betterments") was serialized by the magazine Literatură și Artă Română, which was a sign of cooling relations between Zamfirescu and his mentor Maiorescu (nevertheless, Convorbiri Literare continued to publish Zamfirescu's novel Anna in 1906). He apparently sought to include in his work both major tendencies of 19th century Romanian literature—"art for art's sake" as preached by Maiorescu and the "tendentious art" notably advocated by Dobrogeanu-Gherea. Around 1905, through the articles of Simion Mehedinți, his work came to be criticized by the traditionalist magazine Sămănătorul, who coupled a rejection of modernism with an appreciation of for folklore.

In 1909, Zamfirescu was accepted to the Academy, and delivered a much-discussed speech on the influence of Poporanism and traditionalism in literature, showing his disapproval for both currents. It stated:

"I do not go as far as to state that the peasants' soul is not at all interesting to literature; that is because for me, all of nature is interesting. Despite this, the greatest critics and the greatest creators of human characters do not deal with simple souls, because they are as uneventful as nothingness itself."

Zamfirescu thus attacked the use of folklore for direct inspiration, which saw Maiorescu, among others, defending folk literature and its supporters. Maiorescu had by then ceased most contacts with his former protégé. There were also notable tensions between Zamfirescu and the Transylvanian poet Octavian Goga, whose work was hailed as an example by both Maiorescu and Sămănătorul.

The same year, Zamfirescu was named a Minister Plenipotentiary and the Romanian Kingdom's envoy to the Danube Commission. His Furfanțo volume of short stories and his novel Lydda were both printed in 1911. He was relieved of his diplomatic post in 1913, at a time when Maiorescu became Premier of a Conservative Party cabinet—this came after a Romanian Army officer reported statements made by Zamfirescu, which he alleged were unpatriotic. Reportedly, Maiorescu never gave Zamfirescu a chance to explain himself.

During World War I, following the occupation of southern Romania by the Central Powers, Zamfirescu followed Romanian authorities in their Iași refuge. By late 1918, he became a founding member of the People's Party, led by General Alexandru Averescu, and edited the Iași-based voice of the movement, Îndreptarea. Under the second Averescu cabinet, Zamfirescu served as Foreign Minister in March–June 1920, and then as President of the Chamber of Deputies.

His short term in office was noted for the establishment of Romanian relations with the Holy See (see Roman Catholicism in Romania). In 1919, Vladimir Ghika had been appointed Romanian representative to the Papacy by the National Romanian Council, an institution which campaigned for the recognition of Greater Romania at the Paris Peace Conference. When Ghika's term expired, he was replaced by Zamfirescu with Dimitrie Pennescu, who was Romania's first Ambassador to the Vatican. The Apostolic Nunciature in Romania was set up as a result of this, and first held by Archbishop Francesco Marmaggi.

Duiliu Zamfirescu's last published works were his poetry volume Pe Marea Neagră ("On the Black Sea", 1919) and a collection of autobiographical pieces and short stories, O muză ("A Muse", 1920). In July 1921, he was involved in projects to crown King Ferdinand I as "King of Greater Romania". He died at Agapia in 1922, and was buried in Focșani's southern cemetery.

== Style, assessments, and legacy ==
Zamfirescu's creations were original in style, blending a series of contrasting influences. One of the most enduring of these was the prose of Nicolae Gane. After parting with Parnassianism and Romanticism, Duiliu Zamfirescu adopted some of Gane's themes (including his compassionate perspective on the decay of low-ranking boyars as a social class) and, in part, his storytelling techniques. The writer was also known for the frequent comparisons he drew between his novels and those of Leo Tolstoy. Most of his later works bear the imprint of Neoclassicism.

The impact of Junimea guidelines in his writings is a disputed subject. An opponent of both strict Realism and rural traditionalism, Zamfirescu ridiculed the works of Junimist novelist Ioan Slavici as "sentimental mawkishness". Such contradictions have literary historians such as Tudor Vianu to leave him out of their essays on Junimism. It was also proposed that Zamfirescu associated with both Literatorul and Junimea due to one of their very few common traits, which was political in nature: the two groups shared Zamfirescu's conservatism and his interest in preserving a Romanian aristocracy on the boyar model. Although his similarities with Junimea were extended after he adopted Neoclassical guidelines, Zamfirescu strongly disagreed with Maiorescu and his disciples on the issue of peasant themes and folklore in novels, arguing that the new literature was supposed to draw inspiration from the urban environment and the rural upper class. In one instance, he is known to have referred to Junimea's theory on the peasant novel using the French expression c'est bourgeois et plat ("it is bourgeois and plain").

In many ways, however, Zamfirescu was a Realist, notably using the guidelines imposed by Junimea as a means to give an accurate portrayal of his characters' speech. Researcher Zigu Ornea argued that the main disagreement between him and the literary society was over Maiorescu's view that the national values of Romania were mostly embodied by the peasants, with Zamfirescu arguing that these had also been preserved by the cultured groups of low-ranking boyars. As noted by Ornea, Zamfirescu's focus on the latter group and his nationalism came to contrast with his aesthetic guidelines, and, paradoxically, led to virtually all of his novels having a rural background and displaying a strong sympathy for the peasantry.

Thus, Zamfirescu's positive characters lash out at boyars of foreign origins, to whom they refer as "Phanariotes", and tolerate the unscrupulous Tănase Scatiu in their company only because he is from the countryside. In parallel, Scatiu is also disliked for being a Greek and a profiteering estate leaseholder—indicative of Zamfirescu's own social and national views. Zamfirescu believed in a strong and natural connection between the landowners and their property, as well as between the landowners and their community—this theme was found with many conservatives of his day, including the Junimists Petre P. Carp and Constantin Rădulescu-Motru, and announced a similar theory constructed by historian Nicolae Iorga. In his fictional world, peasants make brief appearances as secondary characters, noted for their deep respect for the traditional owners, as well as for their dislike of all change. In parallel, Zamfirescu introduced socialist agitators as negative characters, and, in Lume nouă și lume veche ("New World and Old World"), one of his less known novels, gave them the central stage as a means to satirize them.

Duiliu Zamfirescu remained a maverick throughout his life, and his publicized outbursts against various trends has probably contributed to the decline in interests among his public and critics. Ornea described him as "immeasurably arrogant, petulant and a snob", noting that these traits had led to "unjust" treatment of his work. During the interwar period, Zamfirescu's views were defended by the modernist critic Eugen Lovinescu, whose arguments were later rejected by his colleague George Călinescu—the latter argued that Lovinescu had failed to prove Zamfirescu's aesthetic value. Criticism of Zamfirescu was especially acute after his 1909 speech, when both competing traditionalist currents, Poporanism and Sămănătorul, attacked his work in its entirety. However, according to Ornea, Zamfirescu's novels serve as a bridge between Junimea and 20th century traditionalism.

Critics have traditionally held a more favorable view of Zamfirescu's correspondence, which was only published after 1937. Offering a glimpse into his lengthy investigation of artistic styles and tenets, they have won acclaim for their refinement.

High schools in Dragalina and Odobești and gymnasiums in Dumbrăveni and Focșani bear his name. Streets in Bucharest, Constanța, Deva, and Târgoviște are also named after him. The Cișmigiu Gardens in Bucharest feature a circular alley (the "Writers' Rotunda"), which has stone busts of twelve important Romanian writers, including one of Duiliu Zamfirescu.
