= N. Petrașcu =

Romanian journalist, essayist, literary critic, novelist and memoirist (1859 - 1944)

Nicolae Petrașcu
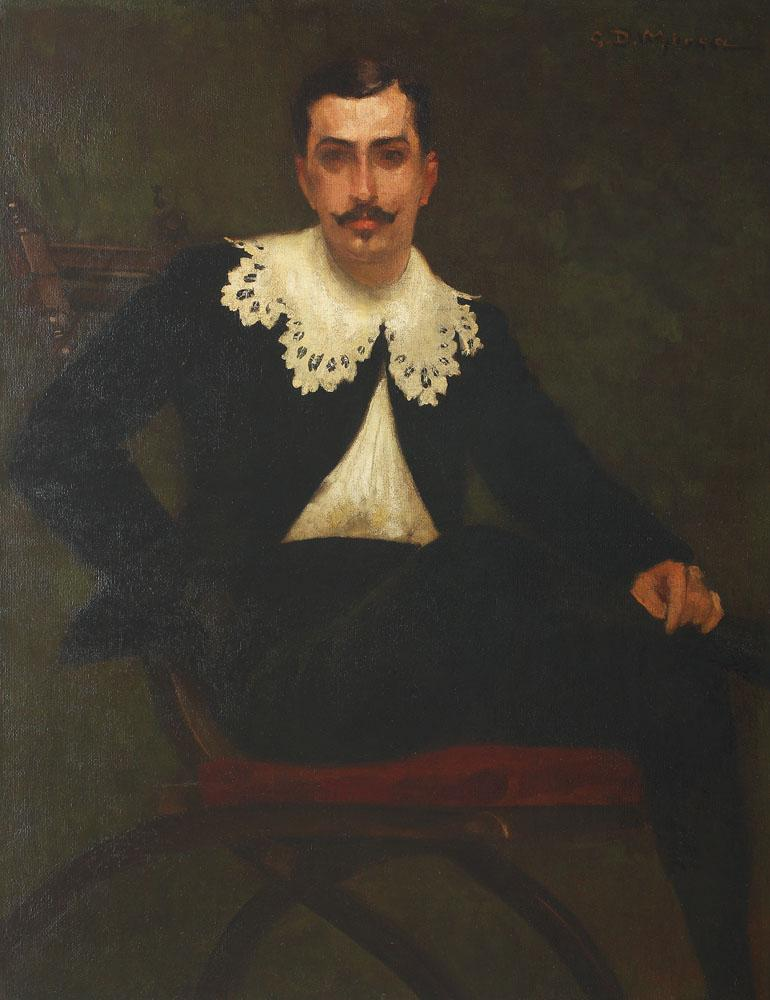
- Portrait of Nicolae Petrașcu by George Demetrescu Mirea
- Born: Nicolae Petrovici; December 5, 1859; Tecuci, United Principalities of Moldavia and Wallachia
- Died: May 24, 1944 (aged 84)
- Occupations: Journalist, essayist, literary critic, novelist, memoirist
- Writing career
- Pen name: N. Petrașcu, Pĕtrașcu
- Notable work: Marin Gelea
- Movements: Realism, Naturalism, Sociological positivism, Determinism

Nicolae Petrovici (Romanian pronunciation: [nikoˈla.e ˈpetrovitʃʲ]; December 5, 1859 – May 24, 1944), known as Nicolae Petrașcu (pronounced [peˈtraʃku, pəˈ-]) and commonly rendered as N. Petrașcu or Pĕtrașcu, was a Romanian journalist, essayist, literary critic, novelist, and memoirist. The author of monographs on major figures in Romanian literature, Petrașcu was originally affiliated with the conservative literary society Junimea, but did not embrace all its tenets. Like his friend, novelist Duiliu Zamfirescu, he parted with the group and, together with Dimitrie C. Ollănescu-Ascanio, established a new circle around the magazine Literatură și Artă Română ("Romanian Literature and Art").

During the 1890s, his group carried an extended polemic with Junimea, and Petrașcu developed his own tenets, which took Historicism, Sociological positivism, and Determinism as its main sources of inspiration. He was also noted for endorsing the views of Western European thinkers such as Hippolyte Taine and Émile Hennequin. In this context, he engaged in public debates with the Junimist intellectuals Titu Maiorescu, P. P. Negulescu, and Mihail Dragomirescu. Alongside Ollănescu-Ascanio and Zamfirescu, his circle came to include, among others, poet Alexandru Vlahuță, novelist Gala Galaction, and architect Ion Mincu. N. Petrașcu was the brother of Gheorghe Petrașcu, a renowned painter.

Petrașcu authored a single novel, titled Marin Gelea. The work deals with the status of geniuses in the late 19th century Romanian Kingdom, and contains several references to important cultural figures of the day.

== Biography ==
=== Early life and career ===
Born in Tecuci as the son of Costache Petrovici-Rusciucliu and Elena Bița, he had his surname changed to Petrașin—according to literary historian George Călinescu, this was on the initiative of Gheorghe and Nicolae's cousin. Also according to Călinescu, it was Nicolae who later changed the family name to Petrașcu, which, the researcher argued, was a "voivodal" variant (akin to the names of medieval Wallachian figures such as Prince Pătrașcu cel Bun).

Before the 1890s, N. Petrașcu attended Junimea sessions and was an admirer of its main figure, the thinker and Conservative Party politician Titu Maiorescu. His other literary idol inside Junimea was Mihai Eminescu (later recognized as Romania's national poet): Petrașcu was one of the young and aspiring authors who had discovered Eminescu's work just before the poet went mad and isolated himself, a generation subsequently classified as "Eminescian". Beginning in 1887, Petrașcu sporadically contributed to the Junimist mouthpiece Convorbiri Literare, sending literary essays which he usually signed with the pen name A. Costin.

At the time, Petrașcu published a series of studies on Romanian writers, including the Romantic Dimitrie Bolintineanu and the Junimist figures Eminescu and Vasile Alecsandri (both of whom successively affiliated with Romanticism and Junimea). Some of his other essays were noted for their polemic tone: among these was his earliest, a piece on short story writer Barbu Ștefănescu-Delavrancea, and an 1888 text on Constantin Mille and his only novel, Dinu Millian.

His work for the Convorbiri Literare journal included a study of Eminescu's work. It was published as a series between 1890 and 1891 (that is, in the two years following Eminescu's death), but carried the title Mihail Eminescu, studiu critic 1892 ("Mihail Eminescu, Critical Study 1892") [sic]. In 1893, Maiorescu publicly praised the Eminescu monograph, and awarded it a prize. Petrașcu later admitted that the writing was actually "an admiring recollection of the great poet".

The essay was also at the center of a polemic with the anti-Junimist figure and Marxist philosopher Constantin Dobrogeanu-Gherea, on topics surrounding the pessimistic nature evident in some of Eminescu's best-known poems. While Dobrogeanu-Gherea spoke of social causes behind the poet's attitudes, Petrașcu attributed these to "a change in the fundamental forces of the contemporary soul, that is to say in the relation between intelligence, will, and faith". Dobrogeanu-Gherea chose not to reply to these points. The study was nevertheless acknowledged decades later by Dobrogeanu-Gherea's disciple, literary historian Garabet Ibrăileanu, who noted its biographical research. Investigating the circumstances of Eminescu's illness and the impact it had on the poet's work, Ibrăileanu used assessments made by Petrașcu (and, separately, the testimonies of poet Mite Kremnitz), to conclude that Eminescu had been incapable of producing any more poems after the full onset of his symptoms.

In May of the same year, his various pieces were reunited under the title Figuri literare contemporane ("Contemporary Literary Figures"), which opened with a study on Titu Maiorescu.

=== Transition ===
Nevertheless, his views were often shaped by outside influences. According to literary historian Z. Ornea, Maiorescu's rejection of most new literary trends may have been resented from early on by several young Junimists: alongside Petrașcu, these included the radical politicians George Panu and Nicolae Xenopol.

He clarified his position in time, through polemics, and, during an April 1892 lecture he gave at the Romanian Athenaeum, confessed that he impressed by Positivism following an 1890 trip to Paris. On the same occasion, he claimed that science had the power to "remove" Idealism, metaphysics, and faith itself. His lecture showed similarities with that of left-wing anti-Junimists such as Dobrogeanu-Gherea, as well as with the ideals expressed by Nicolae Xenopol.

In contrast to both Junimea and the Romantic writer Bogdan Petriceicu Hasdeu, Petrașcu showed that he accepted Realist and Naturalism. At the time, the two innovative currents stood accused of having been generated locally through "imitation", and of not being connected with the cultural environment. The speaker, who stated that "the spirit of imitation" was normal and "the strongest [one] on which the world's progress rests", nonetheless took distance from Dobrogeanu-Gherea and the socialist press in arguing against the Naturalist perception of society as a decaying body.

=== Polemic with Junimea ===
His definitive split with Junimea came in 1896, and saw the creation of Literatură și Artă Română as a magazine headed by Dimitrie C. Ollănescu-Ascanio. This coincided with a noted decline in Junimist influence, and was one of several departures—other prominent Junimists to adopt independent and distinct positions around the same date were Constantin Rădulescu-Motru and Mihail Dragomirescu.

The journal soon enlisted contributions from other adversaries of Junimea, including Zamfirescu, Dimitrie Anghel, Ștefan Octavian Iosif, George Coșbuc, Alexandru Vlahuță, G. Dem. Teodorescu, and Ștefan Petică. The group spoke out against Junimea's strict aesthetic guidelines, and advocated instead an art with a patriotic message and a return to "national specificity". Petrașcu himself hailed the French theorist Hippolyte Taine for the emphasis he placed on race, milieu, and moment, arguing that its "organic" character could serve to renew art and literature in Romania. In parallel, he was interested in Émile Hennequin's Positivism, with its notion of "scientific criticism". Among other influences he cited were Charles Augustin Sainte-Beuve, Francesco de Sanctis, Bonaventura Zumbini, and Ferdinand Brunetière.

N. Petrașcu's articles of the time show him to be speaking out against the "destructive criticism" of Maiorescu and his supporters, arguing that Junimea had sought to marginalize all other voices. He condemned Maiorescu for his belief that a Romanian work could only expect to impose itself if it was of equal value to its foreign counterparts. For Petrașcu, this guideline, known as "autonomy of the aesthetics", was equivalent to cosmopolitanism, and unrealistic in its expectations (he thought Romanian literature was "at a primitive phase"). As the author himself recorded in his memoirs, he had first expressed moderate criticism of Maiorescu's positions in his 1893 study. According to Petrașcu, the elder critic replied saying: "My opinion is that this [new school of criticism], toward which I see you are inclined, can only be a passing trend, since it only deals with secondary issues, such as the social environment." N. Petrașcu expanded on this difference of opinions: "I realized, for instance, that [Maiorescu's opinion] about talent being one and the same, be it born in the forest, be it born in Paris or Berlin, be it living in our time, be it living during the Renaissance, was not an allowable opinion. Just as well, and even more so, the idea that the literary work resides in the beauty of shapes and that the substance, that is to say the thoughts it comprises, has no importance, was also an unjust opinion."

Like Vlahuță, he called on Junimea to tone down its "violent" discourse and adopt an "honest, helpful and proper criticism". Such arguments mirrored those of Dobrogeanu-Gherea, which had first surfaced during an earlier and longer polemic between him and Maiorescu, but were generally harsher in tone.

Convorbiri Literare answered through this attack through the intervention of its editor, the philosopher P. P. Negulescu. Negulescu pointed out that, in accusing Junimea of having failed to support young writers, Petrașcu had overlooked the encouragements Maiorescu had given to Eminescu, Coșbuc, and Samson Bodnărescu; he also argued that the society had not awarded any form of special treatment to its own affiliates. Additionally, Negulescu contradicted Petrașcu's historicist views on national specificity, assessing that the idea was not confirmed by science, and that it was itself a new and foreign concept (stating that Taine was "hard to take into consideration as an authority on the matter"). However, in his analysis, Negulescu refrained from refuting the theories themselves, and instead argued in favor of a middle path between them and Junimism. In 1895, further criticism of N. Petrașcu was voiced by Mihail Dragomirescu, who was still a supporter of the literary group: Dragomirescu indirectly assimilated both Dobrogeanu-Gherea and Petrașcu with various known detractors of Eminescu, such as Aron Densușianu and Alexandru Grama (in his review of the article, Ornea indicated that this was done "abusively").

=== Later years ===
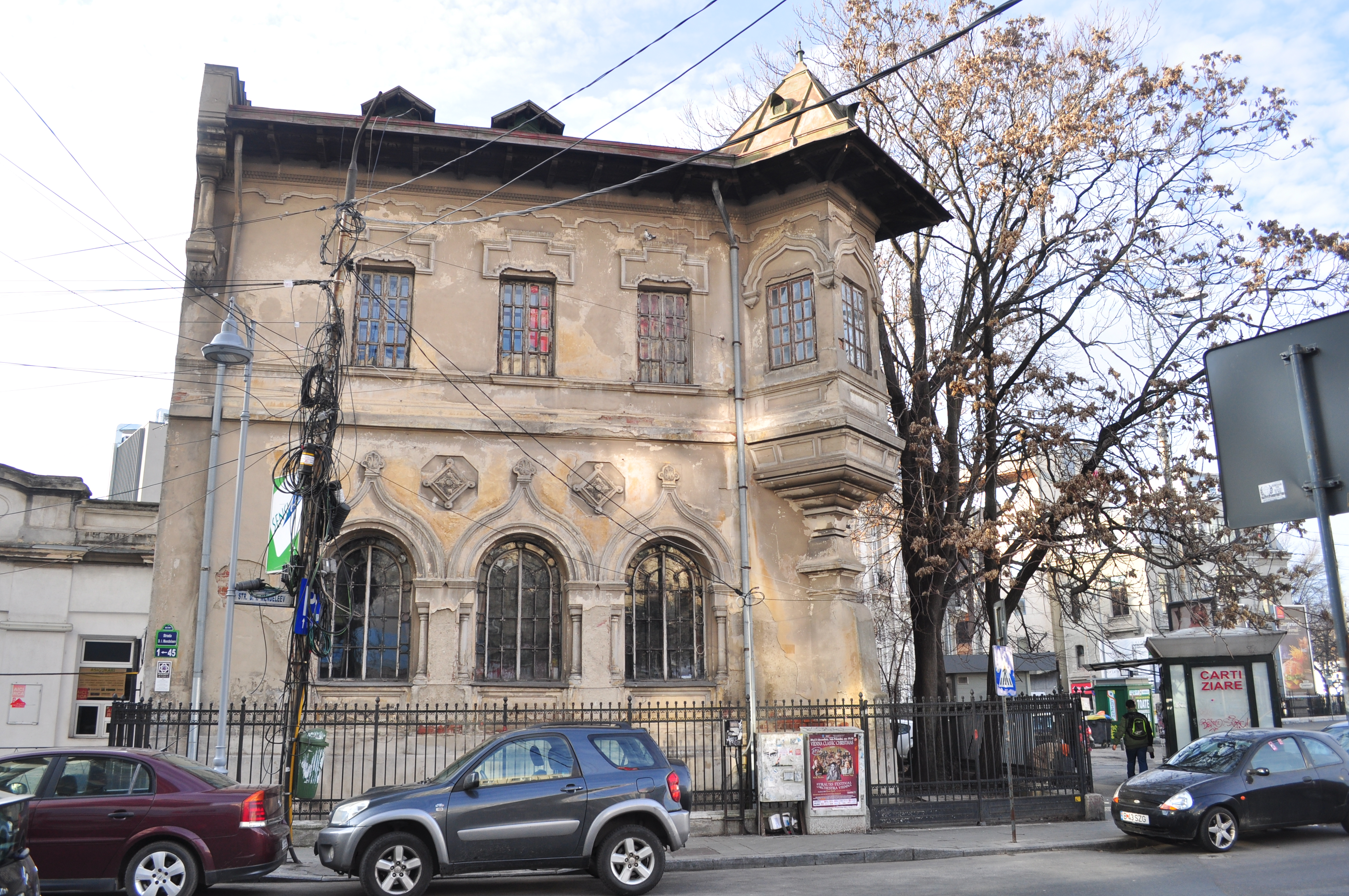
2014 photo of Petrașcu's house in Bucharest, Piața Romană, nr. 1, designed by Ion Mincu

Several years after his polemic with Negulescu, Petrașcu acknowledged the importance of Junimea, and, in 1899, his magazine defined Maiorescu as "a superior man from several points of view". He also spoke of the critic as an inspiration, which, he argued, was still evident despite "the different road" adopted by Literatură și Artă Română. On the occasion of Maiorescu's 60th year of activity, Petrașcu cited him, Dobrogeanu-Gherea and his friend Anghel Demetriescu as the main representatives of Romanian literary criticism. He was nonetheless still critical of Maiorescu's "autonomy of the aesthetics" and his inflexibility in relation to "scientific criticism".

Demetriescu and N. Petrașcu were hosts to an intellectual circle which also included the architect Ion Mincu, the physician Constantin Istrati, the writer Barbu Ștefănescu-Delavrancea, and the physicist Ștefan Hepites. For a while before 1902, they were probably joined by Demetriescu's young pupil Mateiu Caragiale, the son of dramatist Ion Luca Caragiale and himself a future novelist. Among his collaborators at Literatură și Artă Română was Gala Galaction, a writer and Romanian Orthodox theologian, whose lengthy correspondence with Petrașcu was uncovered and analyzed by the literary critic I. E. Torouțiu (who also published and commented Petrașcu's autobiography).

Among N. Petrașcu's final works was his essay on the life and work of Anghel Demetriescu (published by Tipografia Bucovina company and undated), where he notably provides quotes on his friend's old age nostalgia and eccentric projects. In 1929, Petrașcu also authored a monograph on Duiliu Zamfirescu. Literary critic Perpessicius argued that the work had "volubility", "sense of the picturesque" and "critical intuition".

== Marin Gelea ==
Building on his sociological theories, Petrașcu postulated that there was a contrast between the men of genius and the expectations of the local public. He believed that "All the Romanian talents have been deviated or defeated by our society, most of them in the flower of their youth and manhood, when they did not yet have time to lend their power to full measure". Among the creative people he cited where Mincu, Eminescu, Zamfirescu, Dobrogeanu-Gherea, Ștefănescu-Delavrancea, Ion Luca Caragiale, Vlahuță, as well as the writer Ioan Slavici and the visual artists Nicolae Grigorescu and Ion Georgescu.

This theme is a characteristic trait in Marin Gelea, where the eponymous hero, an architect, faces the moods of his public and ultimately fails to adjust to local culture. George Călinescu proposed that the protagonist was actually Petrașcu's good friend Mincu, and noted that the name used in the book may have been based on that of a real-life participant in the 1907 Peasants' Revolt. The critic also argued that the novel had been heavily influenced by Zamfirescu, and noted that the two authors shared "a moralizing and patriotic attitude", a sympathy for the landowners and peasants, and a distaste for the middle class and people of foreign origin ("the superposed stratum", depicted as corrupting). Unlike Zamfirescu, Călinescu suggested, N. Petrașcu had little sympathy for high society, seeing as "lacking in national sentiment and any contact with the country's tradition".

Gelea, who completes his studies abroad, returns to Romania "imbued with all talents and all virtues, having his will set on raising the artistic level of his country", and ready to react against all things he perceives as frivolous. He falls in love with "the young widow Olga Lari" and then with "the daughter of a country boyar, innocent but ailing". He marries the latter, and she heals with support from Gelea. In the process, as Călinescu puts it, the architect becomes "a jaded person, one would say a failure". A particularly important episode involves Marin Gelea's participation in a contest to design the Romanian Metropolitan Palace, and his subsequent rejection by the jury.

George Călinescu was highly critical of the novel and of Petrașcu's techniques, accusing the writer of lacking in "creative force", and his character of "analytical plainness" which resulted in "interminable speeches". Călinescu notably proposed that the author had failed to profit from the more interesting circumstances of his novel, and, instead of depicting "the universal snobbery" of his lifetime, resorted to an "excessively idealist criticism". Călinescu also commented on the artistic ideals expressed by Gelea (and, through him, by the author), indicating that, to a "cultured reader", these could only signify "platitudes". To illustrate this, he cited two of Gelea's monologues. One showed the character commenting on an "ideal" poem, "filled with the promises of a serene and mighty future [...], alive and powerful, and branding with a hot iron the weaknesses and miseries of this day and of life in these times." The other showed Gelea outraged that young women actors had agreed to partake in a vulgar theater production, and commenting on the nature and role of female beauty and behavior: "[...] the treasure of virginal beauty which bestows something angelic upon women, the modesty, the chastity, the shyness, were all blown away in a single evening".

Reviewing Gelea's fictional designs for the Metropolitan Palace and his subsequent frustration, Călinescu argued that Petrașcu had in fact expanded on a "false theme"—in his view, if Gelea is a person of genius, he ought to have seen past such impediments. He concluded that the novel's only value resided in its "historical interest". Among the covert references to various cultural figures of the day, Marin Gelea includes a portrayal of Ion Luca Caragiale, one of the first in literature (see also Ion Luca Caragiale's cultural legacy).
