= Nicolae Petrașcu =

Nicolae Petrașcu may refer to several people:

- Nicolae Pătrașcu (c. 1584–1627), outcast Prince of Wallachia
- N. Petrașcu (1859–1944), Romanian critic
- Nicolae Petrașcu (Iron Guard) (1907–1968), Iron Guard militant

== See also ==
- Nicolae Petrescu
- Petrașcu
