= Petre P. Negulescu =

Romanian philosopher and conservative politician

Petre Paul Negulescu (October 18, 1870 – September 28, 1951) was a Romanian philosopher and conservative politician, known as a disciple and continuator of Titu Maiorescu. Affiliated with Maiorescu's Junimea society from his early twenties, he debuted as a positivist and monist, attempting to reconcile art for art's sake with an evolutionist philosophy of culture. He was a lecturer and tenured professor at the University of Iași, where he promoted the Junimist lobby against left-wing competitors, and formalized his links with the Conservative Party in 1901. From 1910, he taught at the University of Bucharest, publishing works on Renaissance philosophy and other historical retrospectives.

After World War I, Negulescu was an affiliate (later president) of the radical-conservative People's Party, and an advocate of labor and education reform. Serving several terms in Parliament, he was twice the Public Education Minister in the 1920s, but failed to enact his project for vocational-centered schooling.

By 1934, as an adversary of the nationalist far-right, he wrote tracts rejecting biological determinism of all sorts, and scientific racism in particular. Pushed in the minority by supporters of statism, Negulescu supported meritocracy within the framework of classical liberalism. He was sidelined by right-wing totalitarian regimes after 1940, and ultimately banned, shortly before his death, by the communist regime.

== Biography ==
=== Early years and debut ===
Petre Negulescu is widely believed to have been born in Ploiești in October 1872. However, his early papers give his birth date as October 18, 1870, a date he probably concealed and replaced for vanity reasons. As a youth, he attended Saints Peter and Paul High School in his native city, and subsequently enrolled in the sciences faculty of the University of Bucharest, being especially interested in mathematics. After hearing several lectures on the history of philosophy delivered by Titu Maiorescu, he transferred to the literature and philosophy faculty, graduating in 1892. In March 1891, by that time a student of Maiorescu's, he began attending meetings of Junimea literary society, where he met Simion Mehedinți and Mihail Dragomirescu.

From his student days, Negulescu supported the patriotic activism of Romanians in Austro-Hungarian-ruled Transylvania. In 1890, together with Mehedinți, he edited Memoriul studenților universitari români privitor la situația românilor din Transilvania și Ungaria ("A Memorandum of Romanian University Students Regarding the Situation of Romanians in Transylvania and Hungary"), a document that also appeared in French and was meant to draw European public attention to the Magyarization policy of the Budapest government. He belonged to the leadership committee of the Cultural League for the Unity of All Romanians, founded in Bucharest the same year.

Encouraged by his mentor, he completed his theoretical preparation at the universities of Berlin, Leipzig and Paris. He became an associate professor in 1894, aged 22, in the history of modern philosophy and logic department of the University of Iași. Both Negulescu and Teohari Antonescu, the archaeologist, were moved there in a bid to ensure Junimea control over the university, and to consolidate the conservative circles of Iași, against a rising tide of socialist influence. Although he found the city "repulsive" and a "place of exile", Negulescu accepted his appointment as a political and cultural mission. He was soon disappointed by the local Junimea branch and its president, N. Volenti, asking Maiorescu to send them better cultural material. In these early years, Negulescu was heavily indebted to Maiorescu's influence, down to oratory: he was known (and ridiculed) for copying Maiorescu's speech mannerisms. Also like Maiorescu, he was an atheist and a positivist, who read religion in functionalist terms.

Negulescu's publishing debut came in 1892, with a metaphysical essay, Critica apriorismului și a empirismului ("A Critique of Apriorism and Empiricism"), earning him the Romanian Academy award in philosophy. The title indicates the two main philosophical currents rejected by Negulescu, who sought a middle road between transcendental idealism and resurgent anti-realism, finalism, and theism. He found it in "realistic empiricism", a brand of monism, evolutionism and scientism that quoted heavily from Herbert Spencer. His monistic outlook fell short of classical positivism and historical materialism, since it rehabilitated metaphysical inquiry as a legitimate pursuit. Various authors have regretfully noted that Negulescu never truly developed his tentative metaphysical system, which appeared to them inconclusive.

=== Against didacticism and historicism ===
Negulescu followed up with works of aesthetics, including: Psihologia stilului ("The Psychology of Style", 1892), Impersonalitatea și morala în artă ("Impersonality and Morality in Art", 1893), Religiunea și arta ("Religion and Art", 1894), Socialismul și arta ("Socialism and Art", 1895). Later, he published works of applied philosophy: Filosofia în viața practică ("Philosophy in Practical Life", 1896), and Rolul ideilor în progresul social ("The Role of Ideas in Social Progress", 1900). The latter works, of which Psihologia stilului was serialized in Maiorescu's Convorbiri Literare journal, were also attacks against the socialist literary critic, Constantin Dobrogeanu-Gherea, who had tackled Junimea's art for art's sake ideology with calls for didacticism.

Dragomirescu and Negulescu remained the only two Maiorescu disciples who carried on his work in pure aesthetics; others, such as Alexandru Philippide and Constantin Rădulescu-Motru, began as aestheticists, but later veered into more applied science. According to historian Z. Ornea, Negulescu stood further apart from Maiorescu not just because he questioned the more detailed aspects of his agenda, but also because he was a moderate, whereas Dragomirescu was a man of "rigid convictions" and "systematic dogmatism".

His polemic with the socialists, inaugurated in Psihologia stilului, was largely tributary to the theories of Spencer, Frédéric Paulhan, and Jean-Marie Guyau, trying to show that Junimism was more in tune with modern literary criticism. The implicit target was Dobrogeanu-Gherea, depicted by Negulescu as a pale imitator of Pierre-Joseph Proudhon and his "social destination" of art. However, with Religiunea și arta, Negulescu went beyond Maiorescu's theories, and closer to Dobrogeanu-Gherea's, proposing that poetic art was not just a luxury of advanced societies, but also a functional entity that contributed to social progress. He also proposed interpreting style and tastefulness as variables emerging from objective psychological criteria, such as the "economy of attention" and "nervous excitement". On this basis, he proposed a general hierarchy of art by appeal and subject matter, ranking old Egyptian murals below Italian Renaissance painting, but above the minor art of medieval goldsmiths. He believed that art and religion served similar purposes in stirring up vital emotions, and amended the art for art's sake theory with his ideas on "impersonality", implying objectivity for the artist, but also a subjective, self-absorbed, relevancy for his artistic creation.

Negulescu spent those years traveling extensively in Europe, cementing his friendship with Maiorescu and with fellow Junimists. In 1894, he and Dumitru Evolceanu were in Gräfenberg, where the latter was curing his "sexual neurasthenia". It was in that context that Negulescu discovered and promoted Evolceanu as a storyteller, the literary hope of Junimea. Later, Maiorescu took Negulescu along on vacations to Abbázia. In Romania and abroad, Negulescu spent much time with Antonescu, who left notes about Negulescu's eccentric habits, including his asceticism, complete sexual abstinence, and social awkwardness.

In 1894, Maiorescu wrote confidently that the stage now belonged to "the second-generation Junimea", comprising Negulescu, Evolceanu, Antonescu, and Dragomirescu. While preparing for print Religiunea și arta, Negulescu found himself caught in a conflict with Nicolae Basilescu and other non-orthodox Junimists, who rejected his theories from a historicist perspective. In resisting Basilescu, he reaffirmed his purist reading of Maiorescu's credo, namely that "truth" was the universal artistic criterion, and formal perfection an objective trait. He restated these tenets in an extended polemic with the anti-Junimist ideologue N. Petrașcu, the bulk of which became a standalone essay, Lucruri vechi ("Old Things", 1898). However, by then, he himself had embraced some of Basilescu's historicist views about art as an expression of civilization, trying to bring them into agreement with arguments picked up from Hippolyte Taine. Negulescu still argued that subjectivity was the main driver of cultural accomplishment, citing extreme (and, according to Ornea, flawed) examples of artists and intellectuals who withstood all immersion in contemporary life, from Galilei to Ingres.

=== Rise to prominence ===
Negulescu rose to full professor in 1896, in spite of not having a doctorate; he benefited from Maiorescu's influence and intrigues. Maiorescu preferred him over Rădulescu-Motru, who had parted with mainline Junimism. Counteracting the anti-Junimists, Negulescu and Antonescu gave full support to Dragomirescu, when the latter presented his candidature for a professorship in Bucharest. Meanwhile, Negulescu had a personal conflict with philologist Ilie Bărbulescu, intervening to have him denied employment at Iași. His teaching and research were supplemented by articles he wrote for various magazines, including Convorbiri Literare (of which he became an editor in 1895), Arhiva Societății Științifice și Literare, and Revista Română Politică și Literară. The latter review was largely under his control, and marked his distancing from the Cultural League, publishing critical articles by Ovid Densusianu.

According to biographer Eugen Lovinescu, Negulescu was a monotonous intellectual, among the handful of students who lived up to Maiorescu's demand for "absolute fidelity" and "moral servitude". Eventually, Maiorescu even persuaded his pupil to consider marrying into a better-off family, and to renounce his "sickly romanticism". For a while in 1898, he was engaged to Mariette Dabija, the owner of a large country estate. Abandoning such plans, Negulescu remained a recluse and "pedantic" teetotaler, also noted for his aversion to smoking. Ultimately, in September 1909, aged almost 39, he married the 19-year-old Elisabeta Zoe-Julia Mandrea in Sinaia. The daughter of a wealthy industrialist and property owner, it is likely that the Maiorescus introduced the couple, especially as her uncle Nicolae was a founding member of Junimea, close friends with Petre P. Carp and Maiorescu. Six months earlier, she had been engaged to marry the engineer son of another wealthy businessman. Her dowry included two properties in Dâmbovița County: an estate in Bolovani and ten hectares in Braniștea, along with a villa in Sinaia, jewelry, objets d’art, silverware, porcelain, crystal, furniture and a trousseau.

Negulescu entered politics in 1901, as a member of Maiorescu's Conservative Party. He was seen by Maiorescu as a good minister in training, but, in his own account, he only rallied because his teacher had asked him to; overall, he resented political life and disliked the political class. In effect, he followed the Junimist or "constitutionalist" inner-Conservative faction, which was quasi-independent from the main party. The year 1902 also marked his split with the Cultural League, after the latter no longer invited him and other Junimea men to attend its congresses.

According to a note by their former student Ioan Lupu, before 1910 Antonescu and Negulescu were the most popular professors at Iași, their courses attended by more people than the halls could fit. In December 1910, upon Maiorescu's retirement, Negulescu was finally transferred to the history and encyclopedia of philosophy department at Bucharest; his professorship in Iași was assigned in 1915 to another Junimea favorite, Ion Petrovici. In Bucharest, his assistant was a docent, Mircea Florian, for whom Negulescu created a lecture-master's position in 1924. Negulescu became Florian's friend and godfather, but blocked his academic advancement, refusing to award him a full professorship. Reportedly, this was because he feared that Petrovici, whom he deeply resented, would use the opportunity and place a claim on a Bucharest chair.

Negulescu returned to philosophy with a two volumes of Filosofia Renașterii ("Renaissance Philosophy"), respectively published in 1910 and 1914. He continued to maneuver in support of Junimea favorites, working to find Mihai Ralea a professor's chair in Iași, and supporting Dimitrie Gusti, Vasile Pârvan and Ion A. Rădulescu-Pogoneanu when they placed similar bids in Bucharest. He also tried (and failed) to rebuild trust between Maiorescu and the former Junimist playwright Ion Luca Caragiale. During that stage of his career, Negulescu exercised his influence on a new generation of philosophers, including Eugeniu Sperantia, Camil Petrescu, and Tudor Vianu. Petrescu was reportedly his favorite, considered an intellectual equal. Although better known as a novelist, Petrescu always credited Negulescu as an influence on his own work in philosophy and political theory.

=== World War I and People's Party ===
Negulescu was elected a corresponding member of the Romanian Academy in 1915. A year later, Romania entered World War I, and suffered a German invasion. Negulescu fled occupied Bucharest, and in early 1917, took refuge in the Russian Republic, at Odessa. It was there that he came up with the idea of creating a new party "of National Renaissance", to challenge both the dominant National Liberal Party (PNL) and the pro-German Conservatives, and to promote a functional electoral democracy. Over the following months, he co-opted members of the old establishment: the Junimist Gusti, the Conservative Constantin Argetoianu, and the PNL's Constantin Angelescu.

In April 1918, he entered the Alexandru Averescu-led People's League upon its establishment in Iași; in 1920, this would become the People's Party (PP), for a while the main opposition force to the PNL. Its mission, according to Negulescu, was to give legal expression to the revolutionary anti-PNL grievances. In November 1918, right after the Armistice with Germany and at the height of European revolutions, Negulescu's Bucharest home hosted negotiations between the radicalized PP and the Socialist Party of Romania (PS), during which it was proposed to turn Romania into a republic, in exchange for socialist participation in government.

Early in 1919, Negulescu presided over a Bucharest faculty of philosophy "review commission", tasked with investigating colleagues accused of having collaborated with the occupation authorities—such cases included Florian, Rădulescu-Motru, and Rădulescu-Pogoneanu. Negulescu was unenthusiastic about this assignment, and the investigations were cut short when he fell ill (or feigned illness), then resigned. This was the era of Transylvania's union with Romania, which Negulescu fully endorsed, signing at least one petition addressed to the Paris Peace Conference, pleading for the union's recognition.

Negulescu continued to take up anti-establishment causes, and, against Argetoianu's advice, convinced the People's League to abstain in protest from participating in the November 1919 election. Although the negotiations of 1918 had failed, Negulescu supported a rapprochement with the PS. After the latter's leadership was arrested for its role in the general strike of 1920, he appeared as a defense witness, arguing that striking was a legitimate tool within capitalist competition.

Elected to the Senate in 1920, he won a seat for Prahova in the Assembly of Deputies in 1926. After successfully competing with Petrovici for the position, he was twice Public Education Minister under Averescu: March–December 1921 and March–June 1926. His first term saw tensions inside the PP: Negulescu claimed to have exposed embezzlement by his Transylvanian subordinate, Ioan Lupaș, but that such finds were covered by up on Averescu's order.

During his first term, Negulescu tried to implement a law on reforming education in Romania, that would undercut the PNL's project. However, as noted at the time by Gheorghe Vlădescu-Răcoasa, "everything stood in his way". Writing at the time, social theorist Ștefan Zeletin suggested that Negulescu's plan was daring and innovative, if heavily indebted to Germanic models and not fully responsive to actual social needs. Concluding that intellectualism had failed, Negulescu favored an 11-year pre-university education, with the introduction of unitary vocational education, the upgrading of normal schools, and the development of secondary education around "citizen schools". Another part of his program, on which he could agree with the PNL shadow minister, Angelescu, was the Romanianization of Transylvanian schools, particularly those catering to Hungarians, and the secularization of faith schools. Negulescu wrote that he considered the measure imperative, because of the schools' alleged role in spreading Hungarian irredentism. However, he was lenient toward expressions of Hungarian resentment, vetoing a government clampdown on Hungarian nationalist protesters, and speaking out in Senate in favor of political tolerance; he suggested that Hungarians had reason to view the Treaty of Trianon as a collective shock.

His party was ousted from power before he could enact the reform, and Angelescu overturned his conservative policies. His second term cut short by the political power shifts, Negulescu was appointed President of the Assembly, serving from July 1926, when Petrovici took over as Education Minister, and being reelected on November 14, before ultimately stepping down in June 1927. This period was one of political uncertainty: Negulescu's term coincided with revelations that King Ferdinand I was terminally ill with cancer, which renewed calls for a national unity government. His time in office also saw the adoption of labor legislation in April 1927. He remained a vocal critic of Angelescu, noting the "dizzying" and "chaotic" opening of new schools under his mandate, arguing that the whole effort was low-quality and therefore deceptive.

=== Against racism ===
Over those years, Negulescu focused his research on the history of philosophy, as well as one practical and political issues. As noted by Traian Herseni, this new interest was "related", albeit not in fact identical, to the sociology of culture. Such works include: Reforma învățământului ("Education Reform", 1922), Partidele politice ("The Political Parties", 1926), Geneza formelor culturii ("The Genesis of Cultural Forms", 1934), Academia platonică din Florența ("The Platonic Academy in Florence", 1936), Nicolaus Cusanus (1937) and Destinul Omenirii ("The Destiny of Mankind", Vol. I, 1938; Vol. II, 1939). With his new work in aesthetics, Negulescu expanded his system into psychological determinism, from personality types; he also proposed that art history was a continuous dialogue between "critical analysis" and "imagination", which succeeded and tempered each other. Scholar Dan Grigorescu views Geneza formelor culturii as Negulescu's masterpiece, but notes that its system of references, comprising Georges Dumas, Joseph Jastrow, Ernst Kretschmer, Theodor Lipps and Paulin Malapert, was quickly outdated. At core, Grigorescu proposes, Geneza was a Renaissance idea, but also similar to contemporary musings by Albert Einstein and Leslie White.

At the university, Negulescu held a series of courses that were later also published: Enciclopedia filosofiei ("The Encyclopedia of Philosophy", 1924–1926), Istoria filosofiei. Pozitivismul francez contemporan ("A History of Philosophy. Contemporary French Positivism", 1924–1925), Problema ontologică ("The Ontological Issue", 1927–1928), Problema epistemologiei ("The Epistemological Issue", 1930–1932) and Enciclopedia filosofiei. Problema cosmologică ("The Encyclopedia of Philosophy. The Cosmological Issue", 1935–1937). His work was carried in interwar newspapers and magazines, primarily the PP's Îndreptarea, Ideea Europeană, and Revista de Filosofie.

Negulescu advanced to the rank of titular member of the Romanian Academy in 1936. By then, he was an increasingly isolated critic of the prevailing cultural and political tendencies. Against the protectionism favored by the intellectual class, who felt threatened by the Great Depression, he developed a meritocratic and classically liberal scheme, outlined in Destinul Omenirii. He suggested that intellectuals were clients of the state, who expected secure jobs in the bureaucracy, but who took no personal responsibility for their fate; he favored deregulation and saw the crisis as an opportunity for advancement. Such ideas were expressly rejected by the young right-wing radicals Mircea Eliade and Mihail Polihroniade, who noted that, in his day, Negulescu had had an irreplicable chance at social advancement. Criticism also came in from the left: the communist philosopher Lucrețiu Pătrășcanu argued that Destinul Omenirii was no longer in keeping with Negulescu's earlier materialistic monism, but "finalistic" and borderline "mystical".

Geneza formelor culturii, which sought to discover the natural preconditions of individual philosophical stances, was primarily a critique of popular biological determinism, including degeneration theory and psychoanalytic theory. To these, he opposed a combination of functionalism, mutationism, and environmental determinism. In Geneza, but also in his public pronouncements, Negulescu stood out as a vocal antifascist and a critic of scientific racism. He had a polemic with the staff of the far-right Gândirea, arguing against them that neither biology, nor the Romanian Orthodox ethos, made for concrete realities in grounding national identity and a "national philosophy"; in his view, "nation" was a social construct with no biological basis. Moreover, Negulescu separated "peaceful and productive" liberal nationalism from its ethnic counterpart. Implicitly and explicitly, Negulescu also took a stand against the radically fascist and antisemitic Iron Guard.

His work upheld the notion that miscegenation was inescapable and observable in Romanian ethnogenesis, and expressed skepticism toward racial serology studies, taken up locally by Sabin Manuilă. Such observations may have contributed to curbing the influence of Nazi racialism on Romanian eugenicists such as Ovidiu Comșia. However, Nichifor Crainic of Gândirea restated the racialist argument in 1934, in a brochure which referred to Negulescu as an "old philosopher shaped by the ideological school of the bygone century".

Although celebrated at an official level, Negulescu was losing the respect of his students, who visited him in his salon and heard him speak for hours. One of them, the diarist Jeni Acterian, complained that the Negulescu home was "sinister". The professor himself, she argued, was "smart" but "dry to the bone", his voice "raucous and monotonous". By his own standards, Negulescu insisted that a professor's job was not primarily about transmitting information, but about "advancing the science." Also a student of his, Eliade recalled him as an "honest" man of great "self-discipline", but generally "colorless". The target of his jibes against metaphysics, he argued that Negulescu's scientism was most of all shaped by popular science. They quarreled most bitterly about Eliade's study of Indian philosophy, which Negulescu refused to allow in his university.

=== Persecution and final years ===
While speaking out against fascism, Negulescu was also critical of the authoritarian King Carol II who, from 1934, used the state of emergency against both the Iron Guard and liberal democrats. In March 1935, alongside envoys from other groups, he participated in negotiations with Grigore Filipescu's new Conservative Party, seeking a common platform against censorship and repression. Shortly before the start of World War II, Negulescu and Filipescu's political vision was defeated by the rise of successive fascist regimes. The first of these was the National Renaissance Front (FRN), established by Carol. As noted by scholar Maria Bucur, it formalized the clientele system that Negulescu had spoken out against. In February 1938, Averescu resigned the PP presidency and joined the king's supporters; Negulescu replaced him as the head of the moribund party, which survived until the authoritarian constitution came into force later that year, and possibly dissolved itself voluntarily.

In 1940, aged 70, Negulescu was forced to retire by the Iron Guard's National Legionary State regime, the onset of a political purge. Partly recovered by the regime of Ion Antonescu, in March 1941 he worked with Gusti, Mihai Ciucă, Radu R. Rosetti, and Liviu Rebreanu on an Academy reform project. It called for increased national propaganda in the Romanian rump state, to compensate for the losses of Bessarabia and Northern Transylvania during the previous year. His inaugural speech at the Academy, held that May, dealt with generational conflict and the factor of progress. In 1942, during Petrovici's term as Education Minister, Vasile Netea of Vremea magazine interviewed him on the topic of education policies.

Negulescu had a brief return to cultural prominence in 1945, during a democratic interlude that came after the fall of Antonescu. His political stances were probed by Ion Biberi, in an interview that was published in Democrația weekly. In June 1948, the new communist regime stripped him of membership in the Academy. In his late years, he was persecuted and branded a "decadent" philosopher by the official ideologist, Constantin Ionescu Gulian.

Negulescu died in obscurity, aged 80, and was buried in Plot 92 of Bellu cemetery. In the 1960s, communist censorship of his work became more lenient, and, by 1979, he was effectively rehabilitated. From 1969 to 1977, volumes of his unpublished works (including university lectures) were put out by the Academy, under the care of Al. Posescu and N. Gogoneață.
