= Teohari Antonescu =

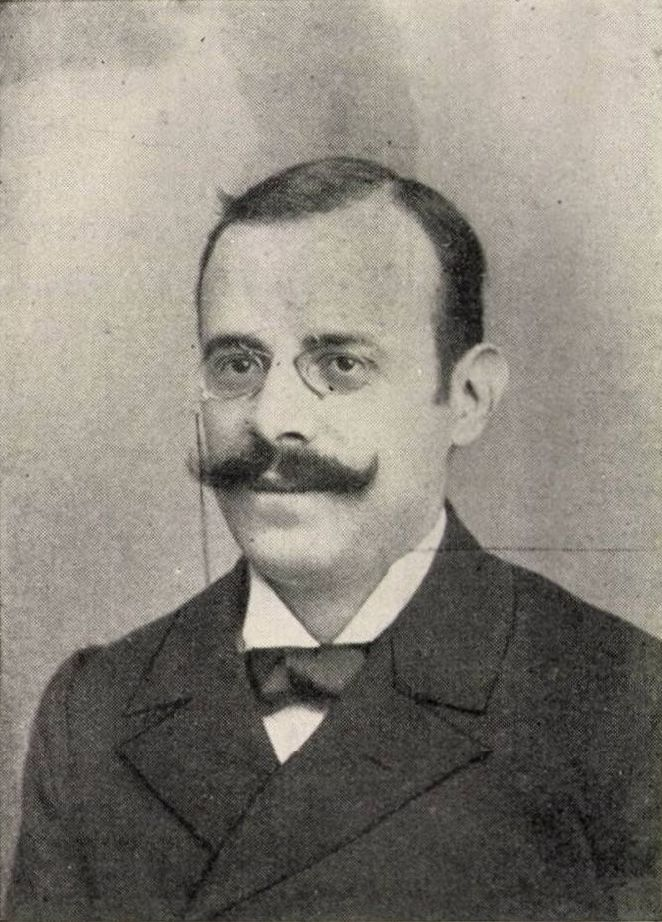
Teohari Antonescu

Teohari or Teochari Antonescu (c. 1865/1867 – January 11, 1910) was a Romanian archaeologist and historian of antiquity. He was born in either Bucharest or Giurgiu, possibly out of wedlock, and had a destitute childhood; he compensated with his scholastic achievements, emerging as a disciple and imitator of Alexandru Odobescu. Like Odobescu, he pioneered Dacology—his acclaimed graduation paper from the University of Bucharest (1889) was focused on the Cabeiri cult in Roman Dacia. He was also discovered as both an intellectual and political ally by political philosopher Titu Maiorescu, who inducted him into Junimea society. With Odobescu and Maiorescu's support, Antonescu was able to study abroad, then to return home to teaching posts at Saint Sava National College, and then at the University of Iași. From Iași, he directed the effort to revive Junimist activities. For a while, he mainly expressed himself through Convorbiri Literare, a Junimist review of which he was also editor; it hosted his numerous essays on ancient art and history, going as far back as the origin and evolution of mankind.

Antonescu impressed his contemporaries with his modern teaching methods and his familiarity with developments in archaeology. He was also commended for his incidental contributions to Oriental studies, which included his sample translations from Vedic Sanskrit and Sumerian. He nevertheless generated controversy by directly attacking older historians such as Grigore Tocilescu and A. D. Xenopol, and by presenting dissenting views on ancient monuments and complexes, from Tropaeum Traiani to Ulpia Traiana Sarmizegetusa. Antonescu was also at times vocal in his support for political Junimism: like the faction itself, he joined, quit, then rejoined the Conservative Party, becoming the focus of scrutiny with his violent rhetoric. He was similarly active within the Cultural League for the Unity of All Romanians, which he used as a venue for his practical-minded, conservative, version of Romanian nationalism. Antonescu's diverse public involvements were always secondary to his scholarly work; they were also interrupted by his neglected cancer, which killed him in 1910, when he was in his early forties. Posterity rediscovered him as a political diarist.

== Biography ==
=== Mysterious origin and early life ===
Antonescu’s precise origins are uncertain, and no birth certificate has been found. His obituary note in Opinia daily informs that he was born in Bucharest, capital of the Principality of Romania, on September 1, 1866. Two encyclopedias state the same date and place, while a third gives 1867. Historian Lucian Nastasă gives the earlier date, saying his father was a minor trader, Petru Antonescu, but that the latter's date of death (December 1, 1865) raises serious doubts about his paternity. Antonescu's disciple Ioan Andrieșescu knew him to have been born in 1866, but at Giurgiu. Researchers Valeriu and Sanda Râpeanu also advance "1866" as the birth year, while Antonescu's fellow historian, Nicolae Iorga, ambiguously refers to him as "a Bucharester from Giurgiu". In 1992, museologist Emil Păunescu proposed that Antonescu was born at Giurgiu "in winter 1866 or in spring of the following year". Several 21st-century books also give Giurgiu as the birthplace, while favoring 1867 as the year.

Writing in 1936, scholar Constantin Rădulescu-Motru recalled that Antonescu was raised in a poor household by a Greek monk, Antonie, relaying a rumor that he was the monk's illegitimate son. The name Teohari ("gift of God"), and the surname that may be linked to the monk's first name, lend credence to this notion. His mother Alexandrina (Lucșița) was very poor, washing clothes for the wealthy families of Giurgiu. Following the death of Petru Antonescu (in the event he was Teohari's father), she remarried, taking the name Petrescu. As recalled by Teohari’s daughter Adriana (Adina), Lucșița was an unfriendly, uncouth woman, ill-suited to city life; he brought her to Iași during several winters. He always avoided discussions about his parents, finding them embarrassing. It is possible that one of the rich men whose clothes his mother washed granted the boy a scholarship, helping cover his expenses while at the Higher Normal School in Bucharest. In addition to keeping silent on his paternity and social status, he was sensitive about his appearance. He believed that the cut on the right side of his jaw, and particularly his sunken eyes, would mean that no woman would love him for disinterested reasons.

The first records of Antonescu's education date to 1878–1879, when he attended the Giurgiu gymnasium, today Ion Maiorescu National College. As classes were suspended around the time of his admission due to the Romanian War of Independence, there is no school record of his birthdate, although the information points to 1867. He finished his first year in fourth place, out of 35 students; in his second, he had the same rank, but only 20 remained. He started his third year in 1880 but withdrew, attending school in Bucharest for the next eight years, no record of which survives. The version provided by Opinia has him as an alumnus of Saint Sava National College. The same paper notes his stints as a clerk at the Ministry of Internal Affairs (1885–1886) and as a substitute teacher of French in Ploiești (1888–1889).

A subject of the newly formed Romanian Kingdom, Antonescu attended the University of Bucharest, graduating in October 1889 with a thesis on the Cabeiri. According to Andrieșescu, it was "ampler and more innovative than most that came out in that period". Among the early reviewers, antiquarian George Ionescu-Gion was much impressed, suggesting that the research was "precious" and fulfilling "all the requirements of science." As observed by Păunescu, it was the work of a "brilliant student", and still cited as mandatory reading 100 years after its first print. Antonescu's paper was directed and heavily influenced by Alexandru Odobescu, who effectively introduced him to archaeology. Antonescu himself wrote that it was only a matter of serendipity that he was ever coached by Odobescu, who then helped advance his career. More precisely, he happened to take unsolicited advice from historian Bogdan Petriceicu Hasdeu, who told him that his original adviser, Gian-Luigi Frollo, was not well-liked in the community.

=== Academic rise and Junimea relaunch ===
Antonescu's other mentor was Titu Maiorescu, who taught him logic, and whom he regarded as "the greatest man ever born in this Romanian land of ours". He also attended Grigore Tocilescu's course on ancient history, and V. A. Urechia also taught him. Upon Maiorescu's intervention, and with direct support from Odobescu, he received a generous scholarship for specialized studies in Western Europe; the former hoped he would become a scholar of archaeology and ancient history. The young man took courses at the Friedrich Wilhelm University of Berlin, Heidelberg University, the Ludwig-Maximilians-Universität München, the University of Paris, and the University of London, also undertaking study visits to the Technische Hochschule Dresden and the University of Vienna, later to Italy and Greece. While in Paris, he registered for the École des hautes études, between 1890 and 1892; his professors included archaeologist Maxime Collignon and historians Bernard Haussoullier and Théophile Homolle. In Paris, Antonescu was roommates with Iorga. Iorga remembers Antonescu as "haughty" from the praise of Odobescu and Maiorescu; in his account, Antonescu also appears as a moralizer, who once stepped into the Latin Quarter and humiliated a Romanian student whom he found to be gambling. He and Iorga, while never close, exchanged career advice in a series of letters. Antonescu privately referred to Iorga as "that annoying creature".

Antonescu's primary focus at this time was the study of ancient art. At Athens, he received lectures from Wilhelm Dörpfeld, while Homolle showed him Delphi. Overall, he disliked modern Greece, describing it as engulfed by the "filthy Orient"—and only finding solace on the Acropolis, "the world's most attractive spot". Andrieșescu notes that his training came just as classical scholars, primarily Adolf Furtwängler and his school, were discovering prehistoric ages—which Antonescu also became interested in doing.

In 1894, upon his return to Romania, Antonescu was named Greek teacher at Saint Sava—his supposed alma mater. Two months later, he was appointed associate professor at the University of Iași, joining there his university colleague, Petre P. Negulescu. During late 1894, Antonescu still networked with Odobescu, recording information on the latter's family history in 1840s Wallachia. Like Negulescu and Rădulescu-Motru, Antonescu was also a faithful disciple of Maiorescu, joining a new wave of inductees into Maiorescu's own Junimea literary-and-political society. However, by his own account, he only came in contact with the club when it was declining rapidly: Maiorescu and others were settled in Bucharest just as he was at Iași, where a local chapter was barely surviving through meetings held by Anton Naum. Maiorescu's letters to N. Volenti reveal that he had personally arranged for Antonescu and Negulescu to be working from Iași, since they was suited for reviving Junimea in its original location. Antonescu's first self-recorded presence at Junimea came in January 1895. The session was held in the Volenti home, and involved various figures—ranging from Miron Pompiliu (rated by Antonescu as "perhaps the quickest-witted" in that room) to "one very fat guy whose name I never learned".

=== Dacian studies and orientalism ===
Starting in 1893, Antonescu contributed specialty articles to various publications, in particular the Junimist tribune Convorbiri Literare. The latter became the main venue of his scholarship, including his introduction to Troy as a "homeland of the Aryan peoples" (1901) and his courses about the origin of Man (1906–1907). He was also part of Convorbiri's editorial staff, following a modernization effort in 1894 (when Iacob Negruzzi was forced to resign for his alleged incompetence), and down to 1900. For a while in 1895, Antonescu was deputy headmaster of the Iași Normal School. In 1896, he became provisional professor in the department of archaeology and antiquities, acquiring permanent status in 1899. In June 1899, he was serving as Iași treasurer of the Cultural League for the Unity of All Romanians—serving the cause of Romanian nationalism. However, he and Nicolae Culianu effectively produced a schism within the League, by refusing to recognize its elected leadership. He resigned shortly after due to widespread disapproval.

The influence of his Western education was apparent in his synthesis of archaeology and history, and in his use of the most up-to-date scholarship. Antonescu's early works in book form include Lumi uitate (1901), a collection of groundbreaking literary and archaeological studies about Dacia and the Ancient Middle East. It also hosted his overview of archaeological research. Andrieșescu reports that, although dedicated to Maiorescu, this particular tract was mostly focused on validating and avenging Odobescu; it was also remarkable in that "nothing is missing", and as such comparable to Adolf Michaelis' more famous contributions, which it technically preceded.

Antonescu was also an incidental contributor to Oriental studies, after he had to replace his colleague Petre Râșcanu, who was unavailable. As Andrieșescu observes, he managed to expand the field of research, with monographs on the Egyptians' origin (1897), "Izdubar" (1898), the Upanishads as a philosophical corpus (1899), and Buddhism (1903). As part of this effort (partly sampled in Lumi uitate), he came up with original translations from the Epic of Gilgamesh, using on classical meter. In an 1899 comparatist essay, Antonescu similarly offered his rendition of lines from the Rigveda. He thus showed them to match poetic images expressed by the one-time Junimist poet, Mihai Eminescu—correctly guessing that Eminescu had been very familiar with Vedic Sanskrit literature. More private notations describe Maiorescu's claims about Eminescu terminal illness. As observed by literary historian Liviu Papuc, they feature unflattering detail, likely to spark "ample debates", about Eminescu's aquaphobia and economic materialism, both of which had allegedly shown up during his final years.

=== Career apex ===
Iorga appreciated that, while heavily influenced by Junimism, Antonescu never slavishly copied Maiorescu. Following Odobescu’s example, he exposed his students to practical applications, holding courses that were seen as lively and original. Museums were an early interest of his; he was particularly enthralled by the Skulpturensammlung in Dresden, also admiring certain works at the Kunsthistorisches Museum and bringing back plaster casts from Greece as a reward for touring the Acropolis with a consul's daughter. Dismayed by the lack of a university museum in Iași, he made strenuous efforts to obtain funds and organize a collection, but the work was still in its early stages at the time of his death.

Antonescu was again received into the Cultural League's regional executive board around May 1900. Though he admitted that the body itself was less enthusiastically backed by the public than in previous decades, he insisted that it was also more professional and persistent in reaching its goals. The section had effectively seceded from the national group, which had declared it dissolved; also that month, Culianu sent Antonescu and A. C. Cuza to Bucharest, as a means of discussing reunification. According to Nastasă, he was "somewhat charming and capable of provoking enthusiasm, but always reserved and in his place, too little active in the cultural or political fields". As Iorga notes, he "lived aesthetically in a world that was his own, dominated by a cold ideal of eternal beauty." He married Eugenia, the only daughter of Junimea-affiliated critic Ștefan Vârgolici. Their only child married philologist Teodor Naum.

Antonescu's 1905 book, Monumentul de la Adamclisi, referred to the Tropaeum Traiani. It was largely a venue for his polemics with Tocilescu, proposing a new arrangement for the detached metopes. Towards the end of his relatively brief academic career, Antonescu produced Cetatea Sarmizegetusa reconstruită, about Ulpia Traiana Sarmizegetusa. It came with a mockup of the citadel, done in collaboration with several artists and shown at the Romanian Jubilee Exhibit of 1906, where Antonescu was also a member of the jury. The work arose controversy, especially since Sarmizegetusa, located in Austria-Hungary, had been neglected—making viewers unaware of its past splendors. Antonescu also published illustrated textbooks on ancient art, including one entirely about Greek pottery (1907).

Antonescu entered politics just as Maiorescu's followers had split with the Conservative Party, and were trying to establish themselves as a national third party. By early 1902, he was reportedly supporting Theodor Rosetti and Nicolae Filipescu, who openly claimed that the Junimist core had made the Conservatives into an ideologically coherent movement. In February 1905, Antonescu was present for negotiations between the Junimists and the National Liberal Party, and spoke at the latter group's congress. The event was covered by the Conservative newspaper, Evenimentul, in unceremonious terms: an "illustrious nobody on our political scene", Antonescu had depicted the anti-Conservative alliance as one prompted by the need for rejuvenation; as Evenimentul noted, the rejuvenators, on the Junimea side, included people in their seventies. During July, Antonescu and Cuza sided with a "Conservative dissidence", which presented its own lists of candidates for the local council elections. The contemporary press cited him as having previously had Conservative affiliations.

=== Final work, illness, and death ===
Antonescu participated in the Junimist (or "Opposition Conservative") congress, held in Bucharest in February 1906. All speakers targeted the Second Cantacuzino cabinet, whom Antonescu himself accused of having presided over "moral dissolution in the very bosom of our society". He claimed that his university had been forced to crerate entire new departments just to accommodate Conservative favorites of unsatisfactory qualifications. The left-wing commentators at Adevărul viewed the affair as a "political academy" dominated by Iorga, observing that the group had no real-life influence.

In early 1907, the pro-Junimist daily, Epoca, hosted Antonescu's political essay, Lupta și credința noastră ("Our Combat and Credo"). The piece was ridiculed in Iași's Conservative press by Lascăr Antoniu, who argued that its "pompous" verbiage clashed badly with the Junimist cultivation of brevity and clarity. Antoniu also noted that Antonescu had a history of insulting fellow scholars, from Tocilescu to A. D. Xenopol. The words he used against Xenopol were reportedly harsh enough as to be condemned by Matei B. Cantacuzino on behalf of Junimea. In November 1908, Antonescu tried to prevent leftist Garabet Ibrăileanu from being re-appointed provisional head of the university's Romanian Literature Department, observing that Ibrăileanu did not yet hold a PhD.

Junimea was eventually reattached to the mainline Conservatives. During his final years, Antonescu was regularly featured in the consolidated group's political newspapers. He was additionally working on a large-scale monograph: Columna lui Traian, studiată din punct de vedere arheologic, geografic și artistic. It used Trajan's Column as a basis for discussing Roman influence on the Lower Danube region, and was the first such monograph in Romanian scholarship. The effort went in tandem with serious health problems, revealed in Opinia as a combination of cancer and kidney disease. As claimed by his Convorbiri colleague Alexandru Tzigara-Samurcaș, he ignored medical advice and all other "matters of the flesh."

The steady decline saw Antonescu finally transported to Berlin for specialized treatment. He was soon after sent back as untreatable, slipping into a coma early on January 11, 1910. He died at 3 PM at his home on Sfântul Atanasie Street. The Romanian Orthodox service was performed at Saint Spyridon. Orations were delivered there by linguist Ilie Bărbulescu, by philosopher Ion Petrovici, and, on behalf of the Conservative Party, by Leon Cosmovici; Petrovici's words, which described Antonescu's return to the earth as a relic, where seen by Andrieșescu as particularly poignant. The body was driven throughout Iași in a hearse, with hundreds of students forming its cortege, and afterwards buried in Eternitatea Cemetery. As reported by Opinia, his only civilian award was the Order of the Crown of Romania, of unspecified rank.

== Legacy ==
The first Columna volume came out later in 1910, with a mournful preface by his former rival, Xenopol. Tzigara-Samurcaș believed that it would avenge its author, cementing his "posthumous glory". Convorbiri also hosted Antonescu's final article—a put-down of philologist George Murnu, whose work he regarded as unoriginal, poorly researched, and partly plagiarized. Păunescu argues that most of Antonescu's own contributions were unfairly forgotten; if he remained at all influential, it was through admirers such as Iorga and students such as Andrieșescu and Vasile Bogrea. On hearing about his colleague's death, Iorga penned an obituary, to which he added: "with him, part of my own youth was vanishing".

Andrieșescu's homage to Antonescu, prepared for his 25th commemoration in 1935, was read on Radio Bucharest in November 1934. Therein, he was praised for his "courageous and romantic" Sarmizegetusa project, which had contributed to awakening national sentiment as the prelude to World War I campaigns. The site had since come under Romanian rule, and research by Constantin Daicoviciu had at least partly confirmed his hypotheses. The scholar also left fragmentary diaries, with some portions hosted by Convorbiri during most of World War II. The entire work was only collected as a volume in 2005, by Năstasă—with the preface provided by Alexandru Zub. Upon reading it, Liviu Papuc recommended it as one of the Junimist "gospels". A more definitive Năstasă edition appeared in 2019; according to literary scholar Marius Chelaru, it was largely ignored by reviewers.

The Giurgiu County Museum and its journal have been named after Antonescu since their creation in the 1930s. The name was preserved during and after communist rule. However, in a 2010 interview oocassioned by Antonescu's centennial commemoration, Păunescu observed that the namesake had been largely forgotten. In some context, the institution was mistakenly believed to have been named after Teohari Georgescu, a communist leader and suspected mass murderer of the 1950s. Antonescu's daughter was still alive in late 1983, when she donated her husband's books, as well as two marble statuettes from her father's Acropolis collection, to the Iași Museum of Literature. In her eighties, she offered encouragement to Păunescu, who was making efforts to complete a biography of her father.
