= Constantin Rădulescu-Motru =

Romanian academic and politician (1868–1957)

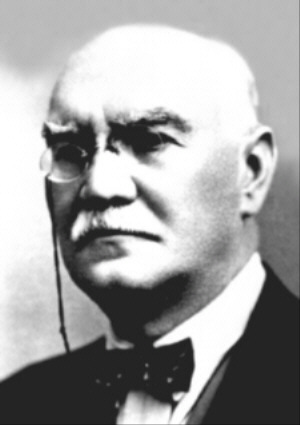
Constantin Rădulescu-Motru

Constantin Rădulescu-Motru (Romanian pronunciation: [konstanˈtin rəduˈlesku ˈmotru]; born Constantin Rădulescu, he added the surname Motru in 1892; February 15, 1868 – March 6, 1957) was a Romanian philosopher, psychologist, sociologist, logician, academic, dramatist, as well as left-nationalist politician. A member of the Romanian Academy after 1923, he was its vice president in 1935–1938, 1941–1944, and its president between 1938 and 1941.

== Early life ==
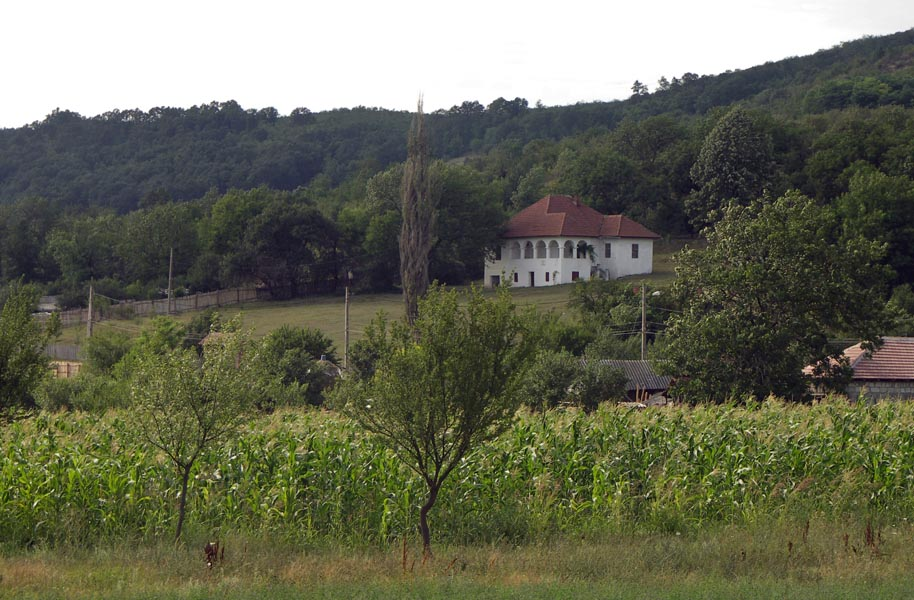
The Rădulescu-Motru memorial house in Butoiești

Born in Butoiești, Mehedinți County, he was the son of Radu Poppescu, whose natural father was Eufrosin Poteca, and Judita Butoi. His mother died during childbirth, and Radu Poppescu married Ecaterina Cernăianu, who gave birth to Constantin's nine half-siblings.

During his childhood, Constantin fell ill with malaria. He also fractured a leg, resulting in a permanent physical impediment.

Radu Poppescu, who worked as a secretary for Poteca for part of his life, inherited a certain sum after the death of his employer and father; this was to take the form of a scholarship for Constantin Rădulescu. He ultimately refused to make use of it, indicating that he would use instead revenue from his estate in Butoiești; the scholarship was eventually awarded to Gheorghe Țițeica, the renowned mathematician.

In 1885, he graduated from Carol I High School in Craiova, and subsequently entered the University of Bucharest, applying to both its Faculty of Law and Faculty of Letters. He was taught by Titu Maiorescu, who was to become his mentor, and attended lectures by Constantin Dimitrescu-Iași, V. A. Urechia, Grigore Tocilescu, and Bogdan Petriceicu Hasdeu. He was part of the last generation of intellectuals to participate in the activities of the Junimea literary society (where Maiorescu had endured as the major influence).

Rădulescu-Motru was awarded a law degree magna cum laude in 1888, and passed his philosophy exam the following year.

== Studies abroad ==
In the summer of 1889, he accompanied Maiorescu on a trip to Austria-Hungary, Germany, and Switzerland, notably visiting the University of Vienna and the Ludwig-Maximilians-Universität München, establishing contacts with German academics. This brought his inclusion into the last stage of a program initiated by Maiorescu as the Kingdom of Romania's Minister of Education: alongside other important cultural and scientific figures (such as Alexandru A. Philippide, Ștefan Zeletin, Ion Rădulescu-Pogoneanu, Iorgu Iordan, Simion Mehedinți, Nicolae Bănescu, P. P. Negulescu, Teohari Antonescu, and Constantin Litzica), he was given official assistance in order complete his education abroad (in order to provide Romania with a new generation of academics). Initially, he directed his interest towards studies in France, attending Henry Beaunis' lectures in psychology at the University of Paris during the fall of 1899.

Between 1890 and 1893, Rădulescu settled in Germany – he lived in Munich and studied at the university for one semester (as a student of Carl Stumpf), and then moved to Leipzig, where he began working in the laboratory of Wilhelm Wundt at the local university. While completing his training with Wundt, he attended classes in physics, physiology, chemistry, psychiatry, and mathematics, as well as Gustav Weigand's lectures in Romanian philology. He married a German woman, who later refused to accompany him back to Romania; they eventually divorced. He took his doctorate in 1893, with a thesis on Immanuel Kant's philosophy (Zur Entwickelung von Kant's Theorie der Naturkausalität), one notably quoted by Henri Bergson in his Introduction à la Métaphysique.

== Academic and political career ==
After 1897, he served on the editorial board of Spiru Haret's Albina popular science magazine. On January 1, 1900, he also founded and edited Noua Revistă Română (which published articles by, among others, Nicolae Iorga, Ion Luca Caragiale, George Coşbuc, Lazăr Şăineanu, Ioan Nădejde, Ovid Densusianu, H. Sanielevici, and Garabet Ibrăileanu). Appointed to the chair of Philosophy at the University of Bucharest in 1906 (after three years of employment at the cultural foundation created by King Carol I), he was also the founder of the review Studii filosofice (later renamed Revista de filosofie), and, in 1918, became head of the National Theatre Bucharest.

In 1923, Rădulescu-Motru joined Virgil Madgearu, Constantin Costa-Foru, Victor Eftimiu, Grigore Iunian, Radu D. Rosetti, Dem I. Dobrescu, and the socialists Constantin Titel Petrescu, Nicolae L. Lupu, and Constantin Mille, in creating Liga Drepturilor Omului (the League for Human Rights), protesting against measures taken by the National Liberal cabinet of Ion I. C. Brătianu in dealing with left-wing opposition forces. In 1925, Rădulescu-Motru, Nicolae Basilescu, and Traian Bratu were part of a government-appointed committee investigating the roles of A. C. Cuza and Corneliu Șumuleanu in the anti-Semitic violence having occurred at the University of Iași in 1923–1925.

Initially a conservative, he became active inside the newly created National Peasants' Party towards the end of the 1920s, and adapted the group's advocacy of a peasant state that would favour small-scale agricultural property (an echo of Poporanism), while taking a more centrist stand than his friend Madgearu. A member of the party's Study Circle, he took part in drafting a new party program (a 1935 initiative taken by Ion Mihalache and Mihai Ralea, it also involved the left-wingers Ernest Ene, Mihail Ghelmegeanu, and Petre Andrei).

It was at this time that his ideas on ethnicity (Romanianism) came to be debated by various figures on the Right, and were the subject of virulent criticism from intellectuals sympathetic to the fascist Iron Guard, who notably rejected his commitment to secularism and Maiorescu's Junimea tradition (Mircea Vulcănescu spoke against "his hostile attitude, shared by his Junimist colleagues, against the penetration of a new, religious spirit, inside the University [of Bucharest]"), as well as from the nationalist modernist Lucian Blaga. According to a later assessment of his work by Vulcănescu, who had since become influenced by the centrist National Peasants' Party member Dimitrie Gusti, the latter's outlook on sociology was also in disagreement with Rădulescu-Motru's adherence to Junimist guidelines.

Toward the end of the 1930s, Rădulescu-Motru was involved in a dispute with the far right philosopher Nae Ionescu, who, although appointed his assistant at the Philosophy department, had begun to criticize his views in the pro-Iron Guard journal Cuvântul; writing to Mircea Eliade in 1938, he accused Ionescu of various unacademic practices, including using lectures on Logic to promote "a sort of dilettante mysticism".

The President of the academy at the moment when Carol II assumed dictatorial powers, he chose to support the new National Renaissance Front (FRN) regime, and moved away from party politics. He remained in office after Carol's fall from power and the establishment of the Iron Guard's National Legionary State government; in the autumn of 1940, as Madgearu and Nicolae Iorga, who had been assassinated by the Guard's armed groups, were being buried, he led the delegation of academy members who defied the policies of Horia Sima by attending the funeral. During World War II, he was supportive of the dictatorship of Ion Antonescu and Romania's alliance with Nazi Germany against the Soviet Union. As late as 1944 he abhorred the attempts of the Romanian opposition to negotiate the country's switch to the camp of the United Nations. Even after the war, in his personal journals he continued to adopt a position sympathetic to the Romanian and Nazi war criminals, dismissing the Nuremberg Trials and the People's Tribunals.

== Communist persecution ==
Critical of Romania's exit from the Axis powers during World War II (see Romania during World War II), he was alarmed by the Soviet advances and the eventual occupation; in his private notes, he deplored the fact that Romania failed to adopt the Marshall Plan. In June 1948, six months after the establishment of a communist regime, Rădulescu-Motru was among the members of the academy purged by the new authorities (he was reinstated post-mortem in 1990). Despite his protests, his entire work was dismissed by official Stalinist rhetoric as "idealism".

He was denied employment in his field of expertise, until two years before his death, when he was admitted to the minor post of researcher at the Psychology Institute; according to his biographer N. Bagdasar, his final years were marked by extreme poverty. Granted assistance following the interventions of Miron Constantinescu and Constantin Ion Parhon, Rădulescu-Motru was hospitalized in a Bucharest clinic for much of his final years. He died while in there, and was buried in Bellu cemetery.

== Philosophy and politics ==
=== Outlook ===
Influenced by Wilhelm Wundt's theories on introspection, Rădulescu-Motru moved away from Kantian philosophy and its tenet regarding the impossibility of transcending reality as perceived through the senses. He considered metaphysics to be open to objective scrutiny, and placed their knowledge at the summit of philosophical approaches.

Stating that there was, in effect, a unity between person and material nature, Rădulescu-Motru developed his own version of Personalism, which thought of the human being and its personality as the goal of evolution in nature – a theory he called Energetic Personalism. He recognized the influence of Georg Wilhelm Friedrich Hegel's views on the relation between being and the whole, arguing that his idealist concept of externalization ("the belief that the world is being led by our ideal", which he deemed "transitory Personalism") had been the driving force behind all modern ideologies, from Socialism and Anarchism to Liberalism (see Right Hegelians and Left Hegelians).

Owing to Wundt's Völkerpsychologie, Rădulescu-Motru dedicated much of his work to assessing and defining nationalism in Romanian social context. Concentrating his analysis on the impact of modernization and Westernization, he argued for a need to adapt forms to the Romanian ethnicity (which he defined through heredity), and represented as the true social fundament (the "community of spirit"). He supported the existence of human races and differences among them, as well as eugenics, even after the defeat of Nazi Germany led to the abandonment of such theories in the mainstream scientific world.

=== Views on modernization ===
In his Cultura română şi politicianismul ("Romanian culture and petty politics"), he devised a hierarchy of cultures, placing Western civilization at the top of the scale, and the Far East at its bottom; he later confessed to Mircea Eliade his reticence in dealing with Hindu philosophy (conversations between the two centered instead on Indian nationalism in general and Satyagraha in particular). The system placed Romania in the margin of European progress, still subject to adopting cultural forms from Western societies:

"Nowhere have bourgeois institutions stemmed out of natural spiritual needs of the peoples, but rather out of the needs of capitalism; the complete harmonizing of these institutions with the popular psyche was a gradual, difficult enterprise, the more so in our country, where the dazzling development of capitalism has left the spiritual evolution, always more laborious, far behind."

Elsewhere, he argued that, despite a traditional pattern of individualism, Romanians lacked "initiative in economic and social life, the two characteristics traits of individualism as experienced by the cultured Western peoples and constituting bourgeois spirit"; according to him, the common folk relied on collective work, which had ensured the survival of village communities during "cursed centuries" (maintaining the mobility of villages "from plain to mountains", but preventing their actual breakup during the medieval period).

In his chapters on the universal suffrage, the parliamentary system, and the Romanian Constitution of 1923, Rădulescu-Motru expanded on this fundamentally conservative thesis, arguing that such reforms had come too soon to be properly integrated. The main danger he saw in the process was the appearance of "petty politics" (politicianism), which, he argued, had a potential of destroying natural developments inside the nation.

Taking in view the characteristics of this evolution towards petty politics, he vehemently rejected Mihai Eminescu's theory on the almost exclusively foreign origin of the bourgeoisie inside the post-Phanariote Old Kingdom. Instead, Rădulescu-Motru expanded on Titu Maiorescu's criticism of "forms without fundament" (in reference to the discrepancy between the Westernized facade and the underdeveloped economic and social setting), viewing the class of low-ranking boyars, increasingly attracted to Liberal currents during the 19th century, as the main agents of incoherent change – this attracted him the criticism of the Poporanist Garabet Ibrăileanu, who argued that Junimea was an exclusivist school of criticism that "has never said [of foreign models] what, how much, and when should be imported". In this context, Ibrăileanu emphasized the gestures of boyars before and during the Organic Regulation government, as indicative of a skeptical nationalist mood (rather than of a cosmopolitan ideology).

=== Romanianism and secularism ===
With Învăţământul filosofic în România ("Philosophical education in Romania"), his 1931 essay first published in Convorbiri Literare, Rădulescu-Motru introduced a polemic that was to mark numerous other writings of his during the following period: reacting to the growth in appeal of far right magazines that claimed to follow a Romanian Orthodox philosophy – Cuvântul and Gândirea –, he made a difference between a "belletristic" trend in higher learning and a "scientific" one, arguing in favour of the latter, and presenting the former as the objective source of anti-intellectualist attitudes he observed inside the new political phenomenon (which emphasized the "human need for mystery"). In essence, the secularist Rădulescu-Motru followed the Junimea tradition of rejecting mysticism, viewing it as the unwanted characteristic of a working class mentality.

He questioned the subjective approaches of Lucian Blaga, Nichifor Crainic, and Nae Ionescu: developing his Romanianism, Rădulescu-Motru stated his support for cultural and national dialogue ("and not the isolation of each people in its own ethnicity"), and for the ultimate integration of Romanian culture in the highest section of European culture. He even argued that principles supported by the Right in defining Romanian specificity were in fact being shared with other cultures (answering Blaga's emphasis on Romanian folklore, he pointed out that its themes were commonplace in neighbouring Balkan cultures; replying to Ionescu's views on allegedly particular tendencies toward theology and metaphysics inside national culture, he stated his belief that "the prestige of the metaphor, the attraction towards mystery and the ontology of the ethnos [...] only show themselves from the second quarter of the 20th century onwards, [and are under the influence of] foreign university circles [...]"; he also rejected Crainic's views on Orthodoxy as the source for specificity, arguing for Christian universalism in detriment of "nationalist spirituality" – an idea nevertheless interpreted by Crainic as evidence of "militant philosophical atheism").

=== Peasant doctrine ===
After joining the National Peasants' Party, Rădulescu-Motru maintained a particular approach towards the group's doctrines and policies after 1935: adapting his criticism of individualism (a trait he associated with the National Liberals) to the Poporanist doctrine of the "peasant state", he defined the latter as necessarily "totalitarian":

"[It] differs from other totalitarian states in that it sets among its norms, first and foremost, the preeminence of the permanent interests of the peasant population. Unlike the Fascist, the National-Socialist, and the Soviet states, it believes that it can serve the totality of the population it is supposed to govern, not on the basis of a glorious imperialist tradition, or through the cultivation of a race relation, or through industrial structuring on the basis of a dictatorial plan, but through the creation of a healthy, moral, and labouring peasantry, ready to defend the country's borders as the geographical and historical conditions demand it."

A pro-authoritarian critic soon reproached that such an ideal, despite its aim to compete with purely nationalist trends, was in fact social class-based, and its "numerical, that is to say democratic" definition (around the argument that peasants formed the majority in Romania) was leading to "peasant anarchy".

Rădulescu-Motru came to support Carol II's National Renaissance Front (FRN) and the one-party system in 1938, speaking out in favour of the kings' initiative to introduce uniforms for members of the academy (clashing over the matter with his fellow academic Nicolae Iorga, in February 1939).

== Works ==
- F. W. Nietzsche. Viața și filosofia sa ("F. W. Nietzsche. His life and philosophy"), 1897
- Problemele psihologiei ("Issues in psychology"), 1898
- Știință și energie ("Science and energy"), 1902
- Cultura română și politicianismul ("Romanian culture and petty politics"), 1904
- Psihologia martorului ("The psychology of the witness"), 1906
- Psihologia industriașului ("The psychology of the industrialist"), 1907
- Puterea sufletească ("Power of the spirit"), 1908
- Psihologia ciocoismului ("The psychology of boyars"), 1908
- Poporanismul politic și democrația conservatoare ("Political Poporanism and Conservative democracy), 1909
- Naționalismul cum se înțelege. Cum trebuie să se înțeleagă ("Nationalism as it is being understood. How it should be understood"), 1909
- Sufletul neamului nostru. Calități bune și defecte ("The spirit of our nation. Its good qualities and its flaws"), 1910
- Din psihologia revoluționarului ("From the psychology of the revolutionary"), 1919
- Rasa, cultura și naționalitatea în filosofia istoriei ("Race, culture and nationality in the philosophy of history"), 1922
- Curs de psihologie ("Lectures in psychology"), 1923
- Personalismul energetic ("The Energetic Personalism"), 1927
- Țărănismul. Un suflet și o politică ("Peasant doctrine. A spirit and a policy"), 1927
- Elemente de metafizică pe baza filosofiei kantiene ("Elements of metaphysics on the basis of Kantian philosophy"), 1928
- Învățământul filosofic în România ("Philosophical education in Romania"), 1931
- Centenarul lui Hegel ("Hegel's centennial"), 1931
- Psihologie practică ("Practical psychology"), 1931
- Vocația, factor hotărâtor în cultura popoarelor ("Vocation – a determining factor in peoples' culture"), 1932
- Ideologia statului român ("The ideology of the Romanian state"), 1934
- Românismul. Catehismul unei noi spiritualități ("Romanianism. The Catechism of a new spirituality"), 1936
- Psihologia poporului român ("Psychology of the Romanian people"), 1937
- Timp și destin ("Time and destiny"), 1940
- Etnicul românesc. Comunitate de origine, limbă și destin ("The Romanian ethnos. A community of origins, language, and destiny"), 1942
