= Petrașcu =

Petrașcu is a Romanian surname. Notable people with the surname include:

- Gheorghe Petrașcu (1872–1949), Romanian painter
- Milița Petrașcu (1892–1976), Romanian portrait artist and sculptor
- Nicolae Pătrașcu (ca. 1584–1627), outcast Prince of Wallachia
- N. Petrașcu (1859–1944), Romanian critic
- Nicolae Petrașcu (1907–1968), Iron Guard militant
