= Nicolae Petrescu =

Nicolae Petrescu may refer to:

- Nicolae Petrescu Găină (1871–1931), cartoonist
- Nicolae Petrescu-Comnen (1881–1958), diplomat, politician, and humanitarian
- Nicolae Petrescu (footballer) (1913–1991), Romanian footballer and manager

== See also ==
- Nicolae Petrașcu
