= Samson Bodnărescu =

Romanian poet (1840–1902)

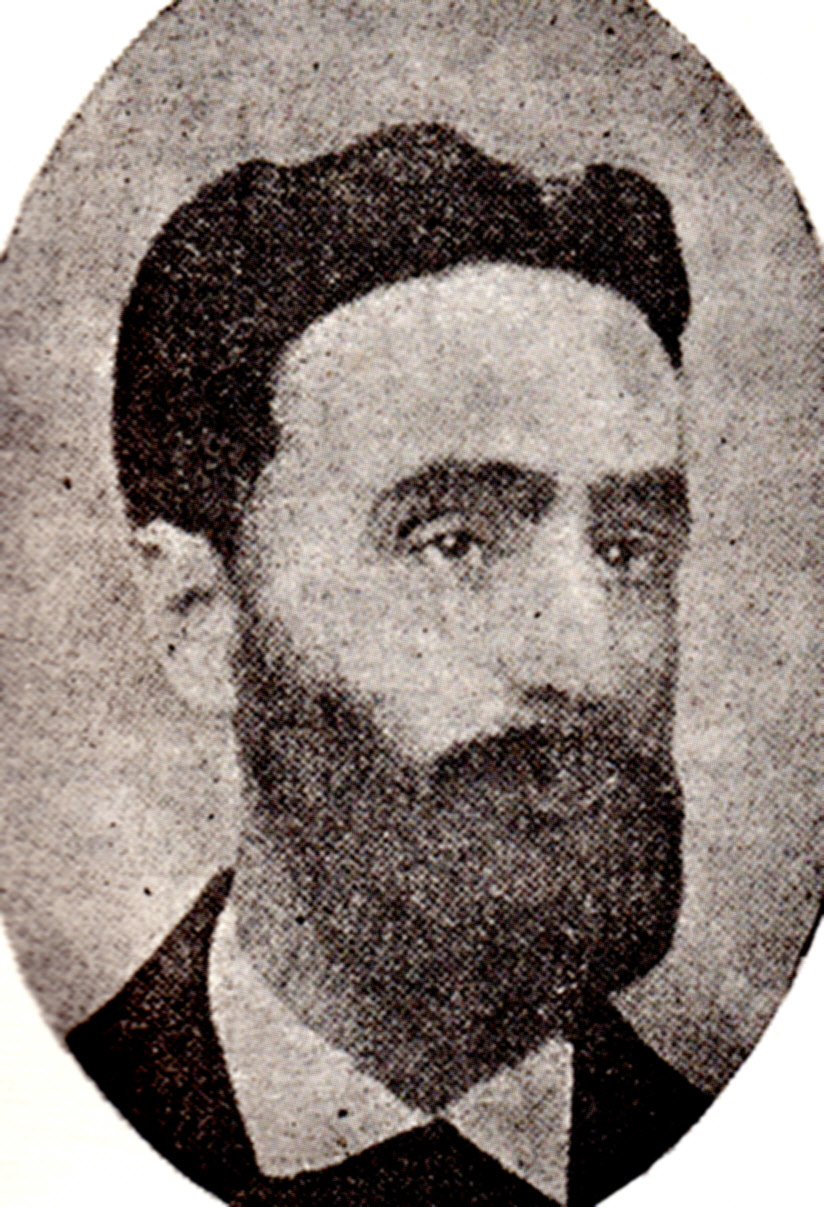

Samson L. Bodnărescu (Romanian pronunciation: [samˈson bodnəˈresku]; June 27, 1840 – 1902) was a Romanian poet.

He was a member of the cultural society Junimea and his poetry often reflected his idealistic philosophical views. This was demonstrated in the tragedy Rienzi, (1868) which was inspired by Edward Bulwer-Lytton, and later Lăpușneanu-vodă (1878–1879),

== Bibliography ==
- Academia Republicii Popular Române, Dicționar Enciclopedic Român, Editura Politică, București, 1962–1964
