= Dimitrie C. Ollănescu-Ascanio =

Wallachian and later Romanian poet, prose writer and playwright

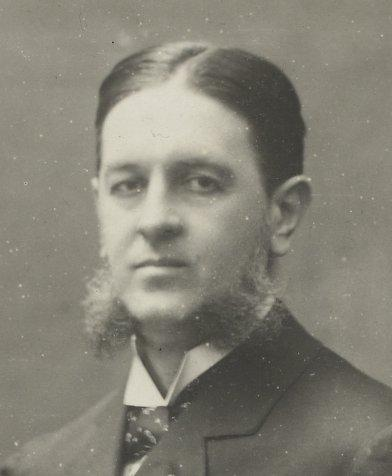
Ollănescu-Ascanio in 1900

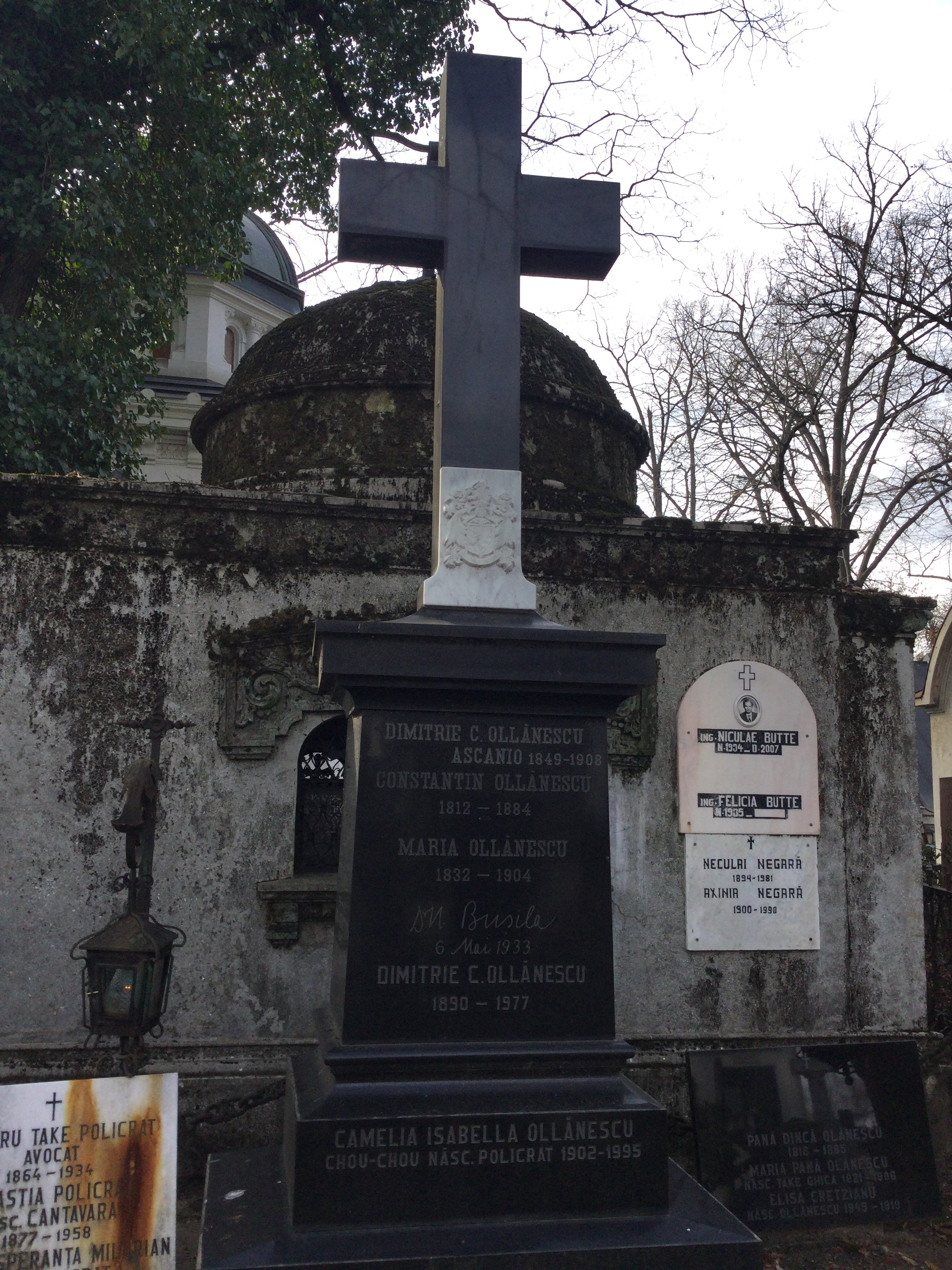
Grave at Bellu Cemetery

Dimitrie C. Ollănescu-Ascanio (March 21, 1849 – January 20, 1908) was a Wallachian, later Romanian poet, prose writer and playwright.

Born in Focșani, his parents were Constantin Ollănescu, an army captain who later became a magistrate, and his wife Maria (née Caloian). He attended high school at Bucharest's Saint Sava High School and at the private Institutul Academic in Iași. He then studied at the universities of Paris and Brussels, earning his doctorate in law, administrative and political science from the latter institution in 1873. He worked as a magistrate in Tecuci, becoming the town's mayor. In 1876, he entered the diplomatic field, serving as chargé d'affaires at Constantinople, Vienna and Athens. He was elected a titular member of the Romanian Academy in 1893, and was vice president of its literary section. He belonged to Junimea society until 1895.

His published debut came about in 1870 in Foaia Societății "Românismul”, with a selection of doina lyrics. He also contributed to Convorbiri Literare and Literatură și artă română magazines, as well as to Voința națională and România Liberă newspapers. He translated Victor Hugo's Ruy Blas and Odes, Epodes, Epistles, the two Satires and Ars Poetica by Horace, earning the academy's Năsturel Herescu prize in 1892 for his work on the Roman poet. Ollănescu-Ascanio's main books published during his lifetime are Pe malul gârlei (1879), Teatru (1893), Vasile Alecsandri (1894), Satire (1896), Teatrul la români (I-II, 1897–1898), Poezii (1901) and Satire. Pe malul gârlei (1908). According to literary historian Georgeta Antonescu, he was "an elevated and elegant poet, but without particular depth; a short story writer not without talent; a capable playwright, but one who did not take on very difficult challenges; and a competent and intelligent theatre reviewer". His Teatrul la români was the first serious history of the theatre of Romania, meticulously documented and displaying a ready capacity to convey impressions and local color.
