= Convorbiri Literare =

Romanian literary magazine

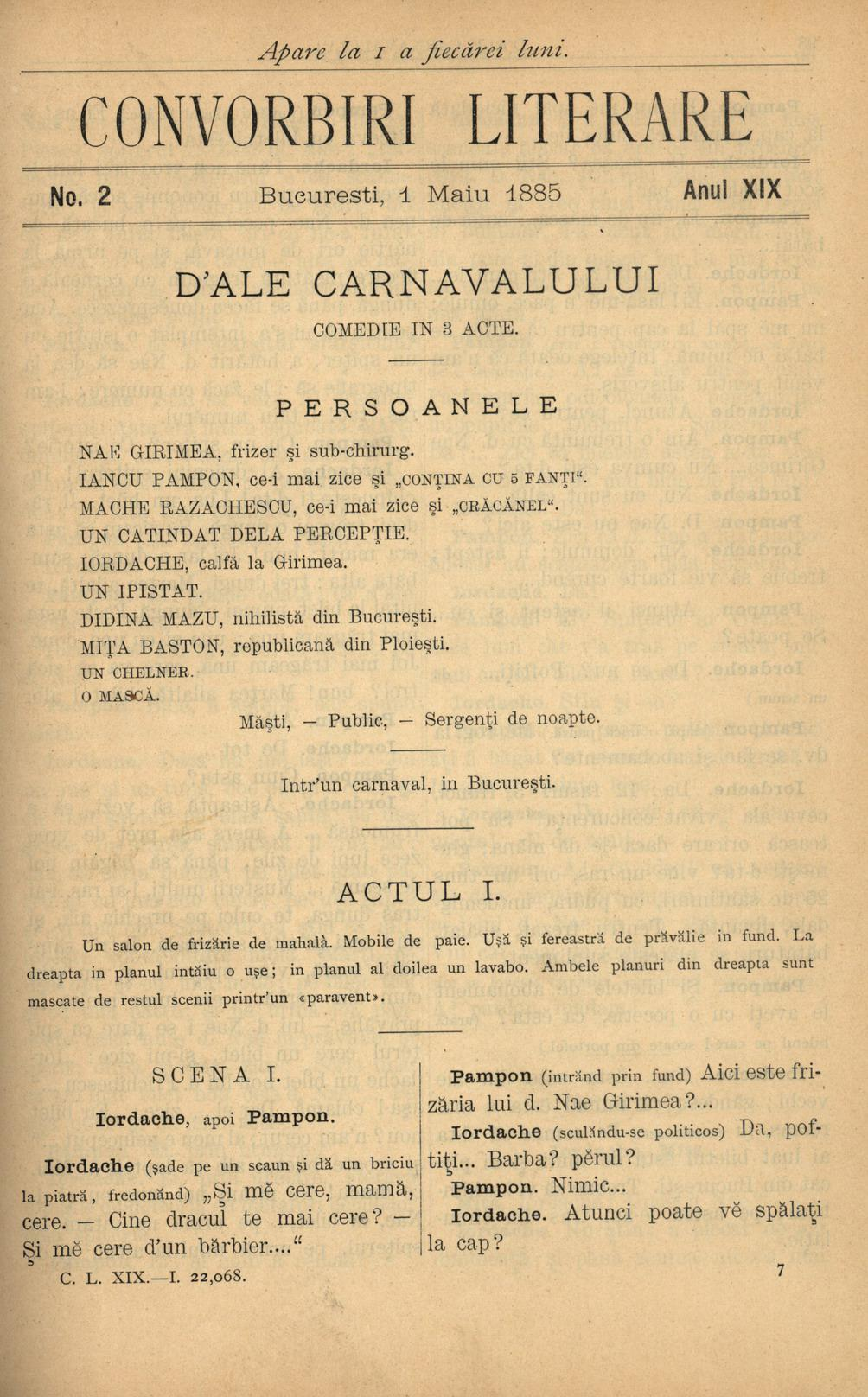
- First page, 1 May 1885
- Categories: Art magazine
- Frequency: Monthly
- Publisher: Convorbiri Literare publishing house
- Founder: Titu Maiorescu
- Founded: 1867; 158 years ago
- Based in: Iaşi; Bucharest
- Language: Romanian
- Website: convorbiri-literare.ro
- ISSN: 1841-7647
- OCLC: 503856097

Convorbiri Literare (lit. 'Literary Talks') is a Romanian literary magazine published in Romania. It is among the most important journals of the nineteenth-century Romania.

== History and profile ==
Convorbiri Literare was founded by Titu Maiorescu in 1867. The magazine was the organ of the Junimea group, a literary society which was established in 1864. The group included aristocratic Moldovans except for Titu Maiorescu. The magazine was first headquartered in Iaşi and later moved to Bucharest.

Convorbiri Literare is published monthly by Convorbiri Literare publishing house. The magazine covered art reviews and translations of literary work. From 1906 the magazine also featured articles on plastic arts. The contributors included Alexandru Tzigara-Samurcaș and Apcar Baltazar among others. The other significant contributors were Mihai Eminescu, Ion Creangă and Ion Luca Caragiale.

Convorbiri Literare has a conservative stance, and its literary rival was socialist Contemporanul during the communist regime in Romania.
