= Junimea =

Romanian literary society

Junimea was a Romanian literary society founded in Iași in 1863, through the initiative of several foreign-educated personalities led by Titu Maiorescu, Petre P. Carp, Vasile Pogor, Theodor Rosetti and Iacob Negruzzi. The foremost personality and mentor of the society was Maiorescu, who, through the means of scientific papers and essays, helped establish the basis of the modern Romanian culture. Junimea was the most influential intellectual and political association from Romania in the 19th century.

== Beginnings ==
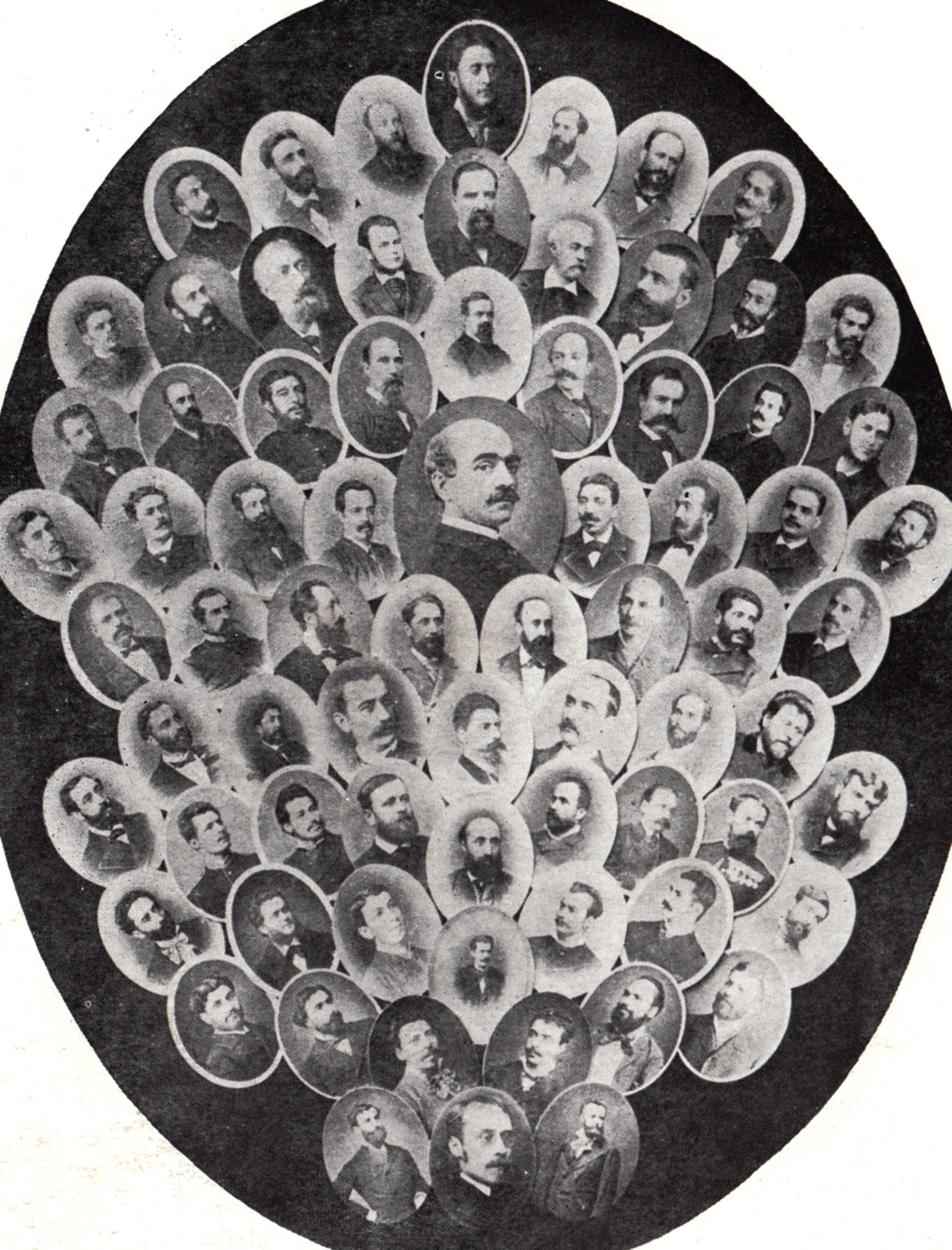
Collective portrait of Junimea, 1883

In 1863, four years after the unification of Moldavia and Wallachia (see: United Principalities), and after the moving of the capital to Bucharest, five enthusiastic young people who had just returned from their studies abroad created in Iaşi a society which wanted to stimulate the cultural life in the city. They chose the name "Junimea", a slightly antiquated Romanian word for "Youth".

It is notable that four of the founders were part of the Romanian elite, the boyar class (Theodor Rosetti was the brother-in-law of Domnitor Alexandru Ioan Cuza, Carp and Pogor were sons of boyars, and Iacob Negruzzi was the son of Costache Negruzzi), while Titu Maiorescu was the only one born in a family of city elite, his father Ioan Maiorescu having been a professor at the National College in Craiova and a representative of the Wallachian government to the Frankfurt Parliament during the 1848 Wallachian Revolution.

== The literary association ==
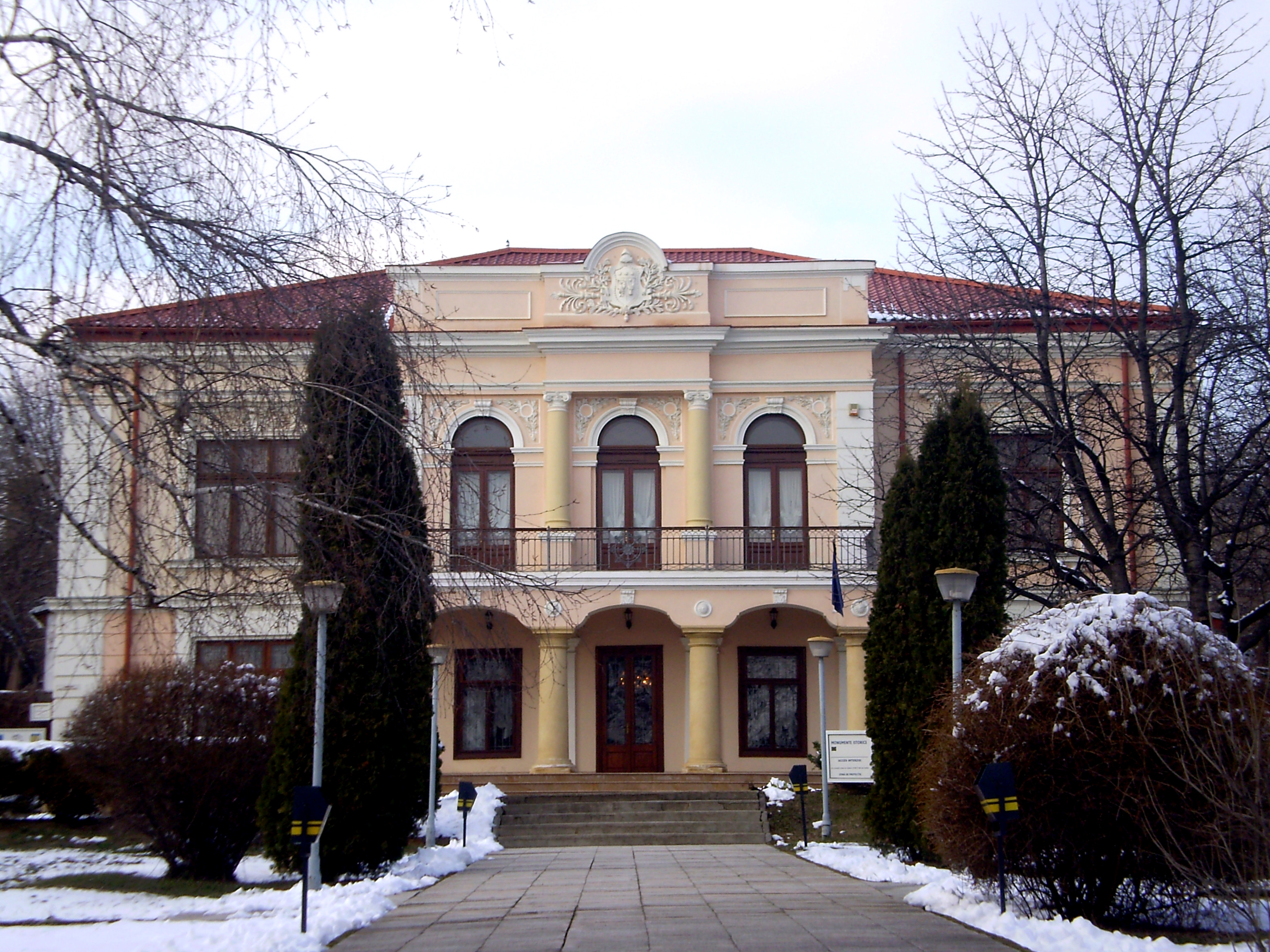
Pogor House in Iași, the headquarters of Junimea; nowadays, The Romanian Literature Museum

The earliest literary gathering was one year after Junimea's founding, in 1864, when members gathered to hear a translation of Macbeth. Soon afterwards, it became common that they would meet each Sunday in order to discuss the problems of the day and review the newest literary works. Also, there were annual lectures on broad themes, such as Psychological Researches (1868 and 1869), Man and Nature (1873) or The Germans (1875). Their audience was formed of the Iaşi intellectuals, students, lawyers, professors, government officials, etc.

In 1867 Junimea started publishing its own literary review, Convorbiri Literare. It was to become one of the most important publications in the history of Romanian literature and added a new, modern vision to the whole Romanian culture.

Between 1874 and 1885, when the society was frequented by the Romanian literature classics – Mihai Eminescu, Ion Creangă, Ion Luca Caragiale, Ioan Slavici – and many other important cultural personalities, it occupied the central spot of cultural life in Romania.

== Theory ==
=== "Forms without substance" ===
After the Treaty of Adrianople of 1829, the Danubian Principalities (Moldavia and Wallachia) were allowed to engage in trade with other countries than those under Ottoman rule and with this came a great opening toward the European economy and culture (see Westernization). However, the Junimists argued, through their theory of "Forms Without Substance" (Teoria Formelor Fără Fond) that Romanian culture and society were merely imitating Western culture, rapidly adopting forms while disregarding the need to select and adapt them to the Romanian context – and thus "lacked a foundation". Maiorescu argued that, while it seemed Romania possessed all the institutions of a modern nation, all were, in fact, shallow elements of fashion:

Before we had any village teachers, we created village schools, and before we had any professors, we opened universities, and [thus] we falsified public instruction. Before we had a culture outside of the schools, we created the Romanian Atheneum and cultural associations, and we despised the spirit of the literary societies. Before we had even a shade of original scientific activity, we created the Romanian Academic Society, with philological, historical-archaeological, natural sciences departments, and we falsified the idea of an Academy. Before we had any notable artists, we created the Music Conservatory; before we had a single worthy painter, we created the fine art schools; before we had a single valuable play, we founded the National Theatre, and we devalued and falsified all these forms of culture.

Moreover, Maiorescu argued that Romania only had an appearance of a complex modern society, and in fact harbored only two social classes: peasants, which comprised up to 90% of Romanians, and the landlords. He denied the existence of a Romanian bourgeoisie, and presented Romanian society as one still fundamentally patriarchal. The National Liberal Party (founded in 1875) was dubbed as useless since it had no class to represent. Also, socialism was thought to be the product of an advanced society in Western Europe, and argued to have yet no reason of existence in Romania, where the proletariat made up a small part of the population – Junimea saw socialism in the context of Romania as an "exotic plant", and Maiorescu engaged in a polemic with Marxist thinker Constantin Dobrogeanu-Gherea.

While this criticism was indeed similar to political conservatism, Junimea's purposes were actually connected with gradual modernization that was meant to lead to a Romanian culture and society able to sustain a dialogue with their European counterparts. Unlike the mainstream Conservative Party, which sought to best represent landowners, the politically active Junimists opposed excessive reliance on agriculture, and could even champion a peasant ethos. Maiorescu wrote:

The only true social class is the Romanian peasant, and his [daily] reality is suffering. His sighs are caused by the fantasies of the upper classes, for it is out of his daily sweat, that the material means to support this fictitious structure we call Romanian culture are taken. And we force him to hand out the very last measure of himself "obolus" in order to pay for our painters and musicians, the Academy and Atheneum members, and the literary and scientific awards wherever they are handed out. And we do not have, at the very least, the gratitude to produce a single artistic work that would for a moment raise his spirits and make him forget his daily misery.

=== Influence ===
The cultural life in Romania was since the 1830s influenced by France, and Junimea brought a new wave of German influence, especially German philosophy, accommodating a new wave of Romanticism – while also advocating and ultimately introducing Realism into local literature. As a regular visitor of the Iaşi club, Vasile Alecsandri was one of the few literary figures to represent both Junimea and its French-influenced predecessors.

The society also encouraged an accurate use of the Romanian language, and Maiorescu repeatedly argued for a common version of the rendition of words in Romanian, favoring a phonetic transcription over the several versions in circulation after the discarding of the Romanian Cyrillic alphabet. Maiorescu entered a polemic with the main advocates of a spelling that was reflecting pure Latin etymology rather than the spoken language, the Transylvanian group around August Treboniu Laurian:

There is but a single purpose for speaking and writing: sharing thought. The faster and more accurately thought is shared, the better the language. One of the living sources for the euphonic law of peoples, aside from the elements of physiology, ethnicity etc., is the increasing speed of ideas and the need for a speedier sharing.

At the same time, Maiorescu exercised influence through his attack on what he viewed as excessive innovative trends in writing and speaking Romanian:

Neologisms have come to be a real literary affliction with [the Romanian people]. The starting point has been with the tendency to remove Slavic words from the language, replacing these with Latin ones, but, using this pretext, most of our writers would, without selection, use new Latin and French words even where we have our own Romance-origin ones, and would discard those Slavic words that have grown only too deep roots in our language for us to be able to remove them. Both the starting point and its development are equally wrong, and originate yet again with the empty formalism of theory, to which the real language of the people has never attached itself.

Accordingly, Junimea heavily criticized Romanian Romantic nationalism for condoning excesses (especially in the problematic theses connected to the origin of Romanians). In the words of Maiorescu:

In 1812, Petru Maior (...) wrote his The History of the Romanian Beginnings in Dacia. In his tendency to prove that we [Romanians] are un-corrupted descendants of the Romans, Maior maintains, in the fourth paragraph, that Dacians were entirely exterminated by the Romans, and there was thus no mixing of these two peoples. In order to prove such an unnatural hypothesis, our historian relies on a dubious passage in Eutropius and a passage in Julian, to which he gives an interpretation that no sane mind could admit, and thus begins the demonstration of our Romance identity through history – with a falsification of history. (...) that which surprises and saddens concerning these creations is not their error itself, since this can be explained and at times justified through the circumstances of the period, but rather the error of our assessment of them nowadays, the haughtiness and self-satisfaction with which they are defended by the Romanian intelligentsia as if true acts of science, the blindness that provides for a failure to see that building a Romanian national awareness cannot rely on a basis that would enclose a lie.

Using the same logic, Junimea (and especially Carp) entered a polemic with the National-Liberal historian Bogdan Petriceicu-Hasdeu over the latter's version of Dacian Protochronism.

The society encouraged a move towards professionalism in the writing of history, as well as intensified research; Maiorescu, who served as Minister of Education in several late-19th century cabinets, supported the creation of new opportunities in the field (including the granting of scholarships, especially in areas that had previously been neglected – amounting to the creation of one of the most influential Romanian generation of historians, that of Nicolae Iorga, Dimitrie Onciul, and Ioan Bogdan).

Although Junimea never imposed a single view on the matter, some of its prominent figures (Maiorescu, Carp, and Junimea associate Ion Luca Caragiale) notoriously opposed the prevalent anti-Jewish sentiment of the political establishment (while the initially Junimist intellectuals A. C. Cuza, A. D. Xenopol, and Ioan Slavici became well-known antisemites).

== Moving to Bucharest ==
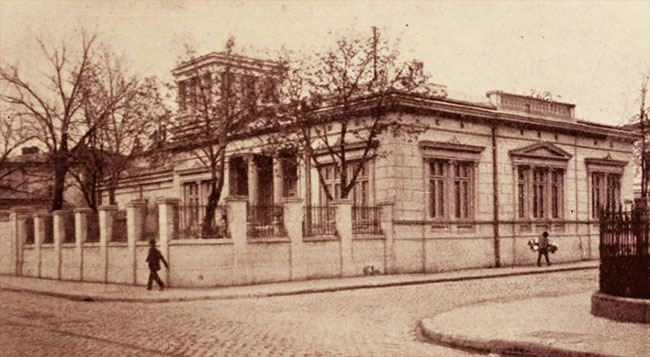
Titu Maiorescu House on Strada Mercur (known today as Strada Arthur Verona), where the meetings of Junimea were held, Bucharest, c.1870, unknown architect. The house was demolished at the end of the 1950s or in the early 1960s, and now in that place is a playground behind the Eva apartment building

In 1885, the society moved to Bucharest, and, through his University of Bucharest professorship, Titu Maiorescu contributed to the creation of a new Junimist generation. However, Junimea ceased to dominate the intellectual life of Romania.

This roughly coincided with the partial transformation of prominent Junimists into politicians, after leaders such as Maiorescu and Carp joined the Conservative Party. Initially a separate wing with a moderately conservative political agenda (and, as the Partidul Constituţional, "Constitutional Party", an independent political group between 1891 and 1907), Junimea representatives moved to the Party's forefront in the first years of the 20th century – both Carp and Maiorescu led the Conservatives in the 1910s.

Its cultural interests moved to historical research, philosophy (the theory of Positivism), as well as the two greatest political problems – the peasant question (see the 1907 Romanian Peasants' Revolt), and the issue of ethnic Romanians in Transylvania (a region which was part of Austria-Hungary). It ceased to exist around 1916, after becoming engulfed in the conflict over Romania's participation in World War I; leading Junimists (Carp first and foremost) had supported continuing Romania's alliance with the Central Powers, and clashed over the issue with pro-French and anti-Austrian politicians.

== Criticism of Junimea's guidelines ==
The first major review of Junimism came with the rise of Romanian populism (Poporanism), which partly shared the group's weariness in the face of rapid development, but relied instead on distinguishing and increasing the role of peasants as the root of Romanian culture. The populist Garabet Ibrăileanu argued that Junimea's conservatism was the result of a conjectural alliance between low and high Moldavian boyars against a Liberal-encouraged bourgeoisie, one reflected in the "pessimism of the Eminescu generation". He invested in the image of low boyars, the Romanticist agents of the 1848 Moldavian revolution, as a tradition which, if partly blended into Junimea, had kept a separate voice the literary society itself, and had more in common with Poporanism than Maiorescu's moderate conservatism:

The old school is Poporanist and traditional, for the old critics have been Romanticists and defenders of the originality of Romanian language and spirit. Being Romanticists, they took inspiration from the people's literature, which contains Romanticist elements, and from the past, as all Romanticists did; that is why the Romanticist Eminescu resembles the old school of criticism in this respect. Being democrats, it was natural that they would turn towards "the people". And as defenders of the originality of language and literature, it was also the people (...) and history (...) that they needed to take inspiration from. Eminescu resembles the old school of criticism in this respect as well. (...) Instead, Mr. Maiorescu was neither a Romanticist, nor a democrat, and neither did he fight as much (...) for maintaining originality in language and literature: as such, Mr. Maiorescu did not look into the Poporanist current, and treated with a certain disdain or, in any case, with indifference the traditional current.

The officially sanctioned criticism of Junimea during the Socialist Republic of Romania found its voice with George Călinescu, in his late work, the Communist-inspired Compendium of his earlier Istoria literaturii române ("The History of Romanian Literature"). While arguing that Junimea had created a bridge between peasants and boyars, Călinescu criticised Maiorescu's strict commitment to art for art's sake and the ideas of Arthur Schopenhauer, as signs of rigidity. He downplayed Junimea's literature, arguing that many Junimists had not reached their own goals (for example, he rejected Carp's criticism of Bogdan Petriceicu Hasdeu and others as "little and unprofessional"), but looked favorably upon the major figures connected with the society (Eminescu, Caragiale, Creangă etc.) and secondary Junimists such as the materialist philosopher Vasile Conta.
