= List of members of the Romanian Academy =

This is a list of members of the Romanian Academy.

Name	Birth/death years	Occupation	Membership	Date of membership
Gheorghe Adamescu	1869 – 1942	literary historian, bibliographer, publicist	corresponding member	1921
Gheorghe Adrian	1820 – 1889	general, military theoretician	honorary member	1875
Ion Agârbiceanu	1882 – 1963	writer	titular member	1955
Ion I. Agârbiceanu	1907 – 1971	physicist	corresponding member	1963
Lucian Liviu Albu	1951 –	economist	corresponding member	2009
Vasile Alecsandri	1821 – 1890	writer, politician	founding member	1867
Theodor Aman	1831 – 1891	painter, illustrator	posthumous member	1991
Bartolomeu-Valeriu Anania	1921 – 2011	writer, poet, cleric	honorary member	2010
Constantin Anastasatu	1917 – 1995	physician	titular member	1990
Nicolae A. Anastasiu	1940 –	geologist	corresponding member	2001
Ion Andreescu	1850 – 1882	painter	posthumous member	1948
Petre Andrei	1891 – 1940	sociologist, philosopher, politician	posthumous member	1991
Cabiria Andreian Cazacu	1928 –2018	mathematician	honorary member	2006
Mihail Andricu	1894 – 1974	composer	corresponding member	1948
Ioan Andrieșescu	1888 – 1944	archeologist	corresponding member	1928
Marius Andruh	1954 –	chemist	titular member	2009
Constantin I. Angelescu	1869 – 1948	physician, politician	honorary member	1934
Eugen I. Angelescu	1896 – 1968	chemist	titular member	1963
Theodor Angheluță	1882 – 1964	mathematician	honorary member	1948
Grigore Antipa	1867 – 1944	biologist	titular member	1910
Ioan M. Anton	1924 – 2011	engineer	titular member	1974
Petre Antonescu	1873 – 1965	architect	titular member	1945
Ion S. Antoniu	1905 – 1987	engineer	corresponding member	1963
Iacov Antonovici	1856 – 1931	bishop	honorary member	1919
Marian Aprodu	1970 –	mathematician	corresponding member	2022
Constantin I. Aramă	1919 – 2003	engineer	titular member	1991
Teoctist Arăpașu	1915 – 2007	patriarch	honorary member	1999
Ilie Ardelean	1906 – 1972	physician	corresponding member	1948
Tudor Arghezi	1880 – 1967	writer	titular member	1955
Constantin C. Arion	1855 – 1923	politician	honorary member	1912
Constantin N. Arseni	1912 – 1994	physician	titular member	1991
Neculai Asandei	1928 – 1999	chemical engineer	corresponding member	1991
Ana Aslan	1897 – 1988	physician	titular member	1974
George Assaky	1855 – 1899	physician	corresponding member	1890
Gheorghe Atanasiu	1893 – 1972	physicist, geophysicist	titular member	1963
Ion Atanasiu	1892 – 1949	geologist	corresponding member	1940
Ioan Athanasiu	1868 – 1926	veterinary	corresponding member	1911
Sava Athanasiu	1861 – 1946	geologist, paleontologist	honorary member	1945
Petre S. Aurelian	1833 – 1909	economist, agronomist, politician	titular member	1871
Alexandru Averescu	1859 – 1938	maresal	honorary member	1923
Constantin Avram	1911–1987	engineer	corresponding member	1963
Andrei Avram	1930 -2018	linguist	corresponding member	2010
Aurel A. Avramescu	1903–1985	engineer	titular member	1963
Victor Axenciuc	1928 -	economist	honorary member	2011
Corneliu Baba	1906–1997	painter	titular member	1990
Victor Babeș	1854–1926	physician, bacteriologist	titular member	1893
Vincențiu Babeș	1821–1907	publicist, jurist, politician	founding member	1866
Emanoil Bacaloglu	1830–1891	physicist, chemist, mathematician	titular member	1879
Mihai C. Băcescu	1908–1999	zoologist	titular member	1990
Ion R. Baciu	1921–2004	physician	titular member	1993
Dan Bădărău	1893–1968	philosopher	corresponding member	1963
Eugen Bădărău	1887–1975	physicist	titular member	1948
Mihail Viorel Bădescu	1953 -	engineer	corresponding member	2011
Victor Bădulescu	1892–1954	economist	corresponding member	1945
Dumitru Bagdasar	1893–1946	physician	posthumous member	1948
Nicolae Bagdasar	1896–1971	philosopher	corresponding member	1943
Alexandru T. Balaban	1931 -	chemical engineer	titular member	1990
Constantin Bălăceanu-Stolnici	1923 – 2023	physician	honorary member	1992
Alexandru Balaci	1916–2002	historian, literary critic	titular member	1994
Nicolae Bălan	1882–1955	metropolitan	honorary member	1920
Ștefan Bălan	1913–1991	engineer	titular member	1963
Mihai Bălănescu	1922 -2018	physicist	honorary member	2011
Constantin Balmuș	1898–1957	philologist	titular member	1948
Gheorghe Balș	1868–1934	engineer, art historian	titular member	1923
Ștefan Balș-Lupu	1902–1994	architect	honorary member	1993
Dan Bălteanu	1943 -	geographer	titular member	2009
Dorel Banabic	1956 -	mechanical engineer	titular member	2015
Petre-Mihai Bănărescu	1921–2009	zoologist, biogeographer	titular member	2000
Ion N. Băncilă	1901–2001	geologist	titular member	1991
Axente Banciu	1875–1959	professor, publicist	honorary member	1948
Mircea Desideriu Banciu	1941–2005	chemical engineer	titular member	2000
Nicolae Bănescu	1878–1971	historian	titular member	1936
Constantin Bănică	1942–1991	mathematician	corresponding member	1991
Ion Banu	1913–1993	philosopher	corresponding member	1991
Ladislau Banyai	1907–1981	historian	corresponding member	1974
George S. Bărănescu	1919–2001	engineer	corresponding member	1963
Eugen A. Barasch	1906–1987	jurist	corresponding member	1963
Constantin Baraschi	1902–1966	sculptor	corresponding member	1955
Dan Barbilian (Ion Barbu)	1895–1961	mathematician, poet	posthumous member	1991
Eugen Barbu	1924–1993	writer	corresponding member	1974
Viorel P. Barbu	1941 –	mathematician	titular member	1993
Constantin Bărbulescu	1927–2010	economist	corresponding member	1993
Ilie Bărbulescu	1873–1945	linguist, philologist	corresponding member	1908
Mihai Bărbulescu	1947 -	historian, archeologist	corresponding member	2010
Sava Barcianu-Popovici	1814–1879	professor, politician	corresponding member	1869
Aurel Barglazan	1905–1960	engineer	corresponding member	1955
George Barițiu	1812–1893	publicist, historian, politician	founding member	1866
Alexandru Bârlădeanu	1911–1997	economist, politician	titular member	1955
Ion Barnea	1913–2004	historian, archeologist	honorary member	1999
Constantin Barozzi	1833–1921	general, geodesist, cartographer	honorary member	1905
Stefan Bârsanescu	1895–1984	educator	corresponding member	1963
Andrei Bârseanu	1858–1922	poet, folklorist	titular member	1908
Jean Bart (Eugeniu P. Botez)	1874–1933	writer	corresponding member	1922
Ioan A. Bassarabescu	1870–1952	writer	corresponding member	1909
Romeo Ștefan Belea	1932 -	architect	corresponding member	2010
Aurel A. Beleș	1891–1976	engineer	titular member	1963
Radu Beligan	1918-2016	actor	honorary member	2004
Grigore Alexandru Benetato	1905–1972	physician, fiziolog	titular member	1955
Gheorghe Benga	1944 -	physician	titular member	2015
Gheorghe Bengescu	1848–1921	diplomat, publicist	titular member	1921
Mihai Beniuc	1907–1988	writer	titular member	1955
Ștefan Berceanu	1914–1990	physician, dramaturg	posthumous member	1991
Dumitru Berciu	1907–1998	historian, archeologist	honorary member	1997
Martin Bercovici	1902–1971	engineer	titular member	1963
Ștefan Berdechi	1888–1958	philologist	corresponding member	1945
Wilhelm Georg Berger	1929–1993	composer, musicologist	corresponding member	1991
Dan Berindei	1923-2021	historian	titular member	1992
Mihai Berza	1907–1978	historian	corresponding member	1963
Marcu Beza	1882–1949	writer, diplomat	corresponding member	1923
Ioan Bianu	1856–1935	philologist	titular member	1902
Mircea Dragoș Biji	1913–1992	statistician	corresponding member	1965
Emilian Birdaș	1921–1996	bishop	honorary member	1992
Lucian Blaga	1895–1961	philosopher, poet, dramaturg, essayist	titular member	1936
Alexandru Boboc	1930 -2020	philosopher	corresponding member	2012
Cornel Bodea	1903–1985	chemical engineer	corresponding member	1963
Cornelia Bodea	1916–2010	historian	titular member	1992
Alexandru Bogdan	1941 -	veterinary	corresponding member	1991
Ioan Bogdan	1864–1919	historian, philologist	titular member	1903
Petru Bogdan	1873–1944	chemist	titular member	1926
Gheorghe Bogdan-Duică	1866–1934	literary historian	titular member	1919
Vasile Bogrea	1881–1926	philologist, linguist	corresponding member	1920
Geo Bogza	1908–1993	writer	titular member	1955
Zaharia Boiu	1834–1903	poet, publicist	corresponding member	1877
Ion Gheorghe Boldea	1945 -	engineer	corresponding member	2011
Ioan Borcea	1879–1936	zoologist	corresponding member	1919
Teodor Bordeianu	1902–1969	engineer agronomist, pomicultor	titular member	1963
Alexandru Borza	1887–1971	botanist	posthumous member	1990
Nicolae Boșcaiu	1925–2008	biologist	titular member	1991
Constantin Bosianu	1815–1882	jurist, politician	honorary member	1879
Demostene Botez	1893–1973	writer, publicist	corresponding member	1963
Eugen C. Botezat	1871–1964	zoologist	corresponding member	1913
Radu Botezatu	1921–1988	geophysicist	corresponding member	1974
Nicolae Botnariuc	1915–2011	zoologist, biologist	titular member	1990
Marcu Botzan	1913 -2011	engineer agronomist	titular member	1993
Constantin Brăiloiu	1893–1958	ethnomusicologist, composer	corresponding member	1946
Grigore Brâncuș	1929 - 2022	linguist	titular member	2011
Constantin Brâncuși	1876–1957	sculptor	posthumous member	1990
Dimitrie Brândză	1846–1895	physician, naturalist	titular member	1879
Valeriu Braniște	1869–1928	publicist, politician	honorary member	1919
Pius Brânzeu	1911–2002	physician	titular member	1990
Constantin I. Brătescu	1882–1945	geographer	corresponding member	1919
Ioan Alexandru Brătescu-Voinești	1868–1946	writer	titular member	1918
Constantin I. Brătianu	1844–1910	general, geodesist, topographer	corresponding member	1899
Gheorghe I. Brătianu	1898–1953	historian	titular member	1942
Ion I. C. Brătianu	1864–1927	politician	honorary member	1923
Ion C. Brătianu	1821–1891	politician	honorary member	1885
Vintilă I. C. Brătianu	1867–1930	politician, economist	honorary member	1928
Emilian Bratu	1904–1991	chemical engineer	titular member	1974
Nicolae Breban	1934 -	writer	titular member	2009
Tiberiu Brediceanu	1877–1968	composer, folklorist	corresponding member	1937
Maria Brezeanu	1924–2005	chemist	titular member	1993
Petru Broșteanu	1838–1920	publicist	corresponding member	1889
Ion Emil Bruckner	1912–1980	physician	titular member	1974
Ioan I. Bucur	1951 -	geologist	corresponding member	2010
Emanoil Bucuța	1887–1946	writer, bibliolog	corresponding member	1941
Constantin Budeanu	1886–1959	engineer	titular member	1955
Tudor Bugnariu	1909–1988	sociologist, publicist	corresponding member	1955
Paul Bujor	1862–1952	zoologist	honorary member	1948
Augustin Bunea	1857–1909	historian	titular member	1909
Victor Bunea	1903–1995	engineer	honorary member	1993
Teodor T. Burada	1839–1923	folklorist, ethnographer, musicologist	corresponding member	1887
Theodor Burghele	1905–1977	physician	titular member	1963
Emil Burzo	1935 -	physicist	titular member	2009
Theodor Bușniță	1900–1977	hidrobiologist, ihtiolog, histolog	corresponding member	1955
Gheorghe Buzdugan	1916–2012	engineer	titular member	1990
Gheorghe Buzdugan	1867–1929	politician	honorary member	1929
Augustin Buzura	1938 -2017	writer	titular member	1992
Nicolae Cajal	1919–2004	physician	titular member	1990
George Călinescu	1899–1965	critic, literary historian, writer, publicist	titular member	1948
Dimitrie Călugăreanu	1868–1937	physician, naturalist	corresponding member	1920
Gheorghe Călugăreanu	1902–1976	mathematician	titular member	1963
Eusebiu Camilar	1910–1965	writer	corresponding member	1955
Petru M. Câmpeanu	1809–1893	philologist, translator	honorary member	1871
Mircea C. Cancicov	1884–1959	economist, politician	honorary member	1937
Romulus Cândea	1886–1973	historian	corresponding member	1929
Virgil Cândea	1927–2007	cultural historian	titular member	1993
Ioan Cantacuzino	1863–1934	physician, bacteriolog	titular member	1925
Theodor Capidan	1879–1953	linguist	titular member	1935
Ioan Caproșu	1934 -	historian	honorary member	2012
Dumitru Caracostea	1879–1964	literary historian, folklorist	titular member	1938
Aristide Caradja	1861–1955	entomologist	honorary member	1930
Elie Carafoli	1901–1983	engineer	titular member	1948
Boris Caragea	1906–1982	sculptor	corresponding member	1955
Ion Luca Caragiale	1852–1912	writer	posthumous member	1948
Ioan D. Caragiani	1841–1921	folklorist, translator	founding member	1866
Petru Caraman	1898–1980	folklorist, philologist	posthumous member	1991
Nicolae Caranfil	1893–1978	engineer	corresponding member	1940
Carol I de Hohenzollern-Sigmaringen	1839–1914	domnitor, king	honorary member	1867
Carol II de Hohenzollern-Sigmaringen	1893–1953	king	honorary member	1921
Gheorghe Cartianu-Popescu	1907–1982	engineer	corresponding member	1963
Nicolae Cartojan	1883–1944	literary historian	titular member	1941
Boris Cazacu	1919–1987	linguist, philologist	corresponding member	1963
Nichifor Ceapoiu	1911–1994	engineer agronomist	titular member	1974
Radu Cernătescu	1894–1958	chemist	titular member	1948
Mihail M. Cernea	1931 -	sociologist	corresponding member	2012
Costin Cernescu	1940 -	physician	corresponding member	2001
Nicolae Cernescu	1904–1967	chemist, pedologist	titular member	1963
Alexandrina Cernov	1943–2024	academic, literary historian and philologist	honorary member	1992
Paul Cernovodeanu	1927–2006	historian	honorary member	1999
Ioan Ceterchi	1926–1992	jurist	corresponding member	1974
Sergiu I. Chiriacescu	1940–2010	engineer	corresponding member	1999
Constantin D. Chiriță	1902–1993	pedolog	titular member	1990
Gheorghe Chițu	1828–1897	publicist, politician	titular member	1879
Gheorghe Chivu	1947 -	philologist	corresponding member	2010
Alexandru Cihac	1825–1887	philologist	honorary member	1872
Iacob Cristian Stanislau Cihac	1800–1888	physician, naturalist	honorary member	1872
Stefan Ciobanu	1883–1950	historian	titular member	1918
Daniel Ciobotea	1951 -	patriarch	honorary member	2007
Șerban Cioculescu	1902–1988	critic, literary historian	titular member	1974
Constantin Ciopraga	1916–2009	critic, literary historian	honorary member	1993
Ecaterina Ciorănescu-Nenițescu	1909–2000	chemist	titular member	1974
Florin Ciorăscu	1914–1977	physicist	corresponding member	1963
Roman Ciorogariu	1852–1936	bishop	honorary member	1921
Dimitrie N. Ciotori	1885 - 1965	politician	honorary member	1936
Timotei Cipariu	1805–1887	philologist, linguist	founding member	1866
Alexandru Cisman	1897–1967	physicist	corresponding member	1963
Alexandru Ciucă	1880–1972	veterinary	corresponding member	1946
Mihai Ciucă	1883–1969	physician	titular member	1938
George Ciucu	1927–1990	mathematician	corresponding member	1974
Alexandru Ciucurencu	1903–1977	painter	corresponding member	1963
Gheorghe Ciuhandu	1875–1947	priest, publicist	honorary member	1946
Liviu Ciulei	1923–2011	director, scenographer, actor, architect	corresponding member	1992
Ioan Ciurea	1878–1943	veterinary	corresponding member	1927
Constantin Climescu	1844–1926	mathematician	corresponding member	1892
Henri Coandă	1886–1972	inventor, engineer	titular member	1970
Grigore Cobălcescu	1831–1892	geologist, paleontologist	titular member	1886
Vasile Cocheci	1922–1996	chemical engineer	corresponding member	1991
Alexandru Codarcea	1900–1974	geologist	titular member	1955
Mihai Codreanu	1876–1957	poet	corresponding member	1942
Radu Codreanu	1904–1987	biologist, citolog	titular member	1974
Theodor Codrescu	1819–1894	historian, publicist, philologist	corresponding member	1886
Horia Colan	1926-2017	engineer	titular member	2010
Nicolae Colan	1893–1967	metropolitan	titular member	1942
Mihnea Colțoiu	1954 -	mathematician	corresponding member	2006
Dumitru Combiescu	1887–1961	physician	titular member	1955
Sorin Comoroșan	1927 -	biochemist, physicist	honorary member	1992
Dimitrie Comșa	1846–1931	agronomist, professor, politician	honorary member	1926
Grigorie Comșa	1889–1935	bishop	honorary member	1934
Nicolae M. Condiescu	1880–1939	general, writer	honorary member	1938
Emil Condurachi	1912–1987	historian, archeologist	titular member	1955
George (Gogu) Constantinescu	1881–1965	inventor, engineer	titular member	1965
Gherasim Constantinescu	1902–1979	oenologist	titular member	1963
Liviu Constantinescu	1914–1997	geophysicist	titular member	1990
Miron Constantinescu	1917–1974	sociologist, historian, politician	titular member	1974
Nicolae N. Constantinescu	1920–2000	economist	titular member	1990
Paul Constantinescu	1909–1963	composer	corresponding member	1963
Virgiliu Niculae G. Constantinescu	1931–2009	engineer	titular member	1991
Petre Constantinescu-Iași	1892–1977	historian, politician	titular member	1948
Florin Constantiniu	1933–2012	historian	titular member	2006
Aretin Corciovei	1930–1992	physicist	corresponding member	1974
Constantin Corduneanu	1928-2018	mathematician	titular member	2015
Nicolae Corneanu	1923-2014	metropolitan	honorary member	1992
George Coșbuc	1866–1918	poet	titular member	1916
Octavian Lazăr Cosma	1933 -	musicologist	corresponding member	2011
Leon C. Cosmovici	1857–1921	zoologist, fiziolog	corresponding member	1893
Paul Mircea Cosmovici	1921–2006	jurist	titular member	1995
Mihai Costăchescu	1884–1953	historian, folklorist	corresponding member	1939
Neculai Costăchescu	1876–1939	chemist, politician	honorary member	1936
Teodor D. Costescu	1864–1939	professor, politician	honorary member	1934
Alexandru Costin	1880–1948	jurist	titular member	1948
Valeriu D. Cotea	1926 -2016	oenologist	titular member	1993
Ion Coteanu	1920–1997	linguist	titular member	1974
Dimitrie Cozacovici	1790–1868	historian, philologist	founding member	1866
Emil C. Crăciun	1896–1976	physician	corresponding member	1963
Nichifor Crainic	1889–1972	writer, diarist, politician	titular member	1940
Grigore Crăiniceanu	1852–1935	general	titular member	1911
Ion Creangă	1839–1889	writer	posthumous member	1948
George Crețianu	1829–1887	poet, publicist	honorary member	1882
Miron Cristea	1868–1939	patriarch	honorary member	1919
Paul Dan Cristea	1941–2013	electronics engineer, physicist	titular member	2011
Nicolae Dan Cristescu	1929 -2020	mathematician	titular member	1992
Romulus Cristescu	1928 -2021	mathematician	titular member	1990
Gheorghe Cuciureanu	1814–1886	physician, politician	honorary member	1871
Ioan Cuculescu	1936 -2023	mathematician	corresponding member	2001
Neculai Culianu	1832–1915	mathematician, astronomer	corresponding member	1889
Alexandru C. Cuza	1857–1947	professor, politician	titular member	1936
Daniel Dăianu	1952 -	economist	corresponding member	2001
Constantin Daicoviciu	1898–1973	historian, archeologist	titular member	1955
Dimitrie Dan	1856–1927	folklorist, historian	corresponding member	1904
Leon Dănăilă	1933 -	physician	titular member	2004
Negoiță Dănăilă	1878–1953	chemist	honorary member	1939
Wilhelm Dancă	1959 -	philosopher, theologist	corresponding member	2013
Leon Silviu Daniello	1898–1970	physician	corresponding member	1965
Daniel Danielopolu	1884–1955	fiziolog, clinician, farmacolog	honorary member	1938
Dan Dascălu	1942-2021	engineer	titular member	1993
Nicolae Dașcovici	1888–1969	jurist, historian, publicist	corresponding member	1948
Mihail D. David	1886–1954	geographer, geologist	corresponding member	1935
David Davidescu	1916–2004	engineer agronomist	titular member	1990
Barbu Ștefănescu Delavrancea	1858–1918	writer	titular member	1912
Dan Eugen Demco	1942 -	physicist	corresponding member	2011
Crișan Demetrescu	1940 -	physicist	corresponding member	2006
Gheorghe Demetrescu	1885–1969	astronomer, seismologist	titular member	1955
Anghel Demetriescu	1847–1903	theoretician, literary critic	corresponding member	1902
Aron Densușianu	1837–1900	literary historian, poet, folklorist	corresponding member	1877
Nicolae Densusianu	1846–1911	historian, folklorist	corresponding member	1880
Ovid Densusianu	1873–1938	philologist, linguist, folklorist, literary historian	titular member	1918
Emanuel Diaconescu	1944–2011	engineer	corresponding member	1990
Alexandru Dima	1905–1979	critic, literary historian	corresponding member	1963
Gheorghe Dima	1847–1925	composer, conductor	honorary member	1919
Teodor Dima	1939 -2019	philosopher, logician	titular member	2011
Radu Alexandru Dimitrescu	1926-2013	geologist	titular member	1996
Florica Dimitrescu-Niculescu	1928 -	linguist	honorary member	2011
Mircia Dimitrescu	1941 -	artist plastic, illustrator	corresponding member	2013
Ambrosiu Dimitrovici	1838–1866	publicist	founding member	1866
Paul Gh. Dimo	1905–1990	engineer	titular member	1990
Constantin N. Dinculescu	1898–1990	engineer	titular member	1990
Gabriela Pană Dindelegan	1942 -	linguist	corresponding member	2004
Mircea Djuvara	1886–1945	philosopher, jurist	corresponding member	1936
Dumitru Dobrescu	1927-2020	farmacolog	corresponding member	1992
Emilian Dobrescu	1933 -	economist	titular member	1990
Nicolae Dobrescu	1874–1914	historian	corresponding member	1911
Constantin Dobrogeanu-Gherea	1855–1920	critic, theoretician literar	posthumous member	1948
Nicolae Docan	1874–1933	historian	corresponding member	1915
Ion Dogaru	1935–2018	jurist	corresponding member	2001
Octav Doicescu	1902–1981	architect	titular member	1974
Ștefan Augustin Doinaș	1922–2002	writer	titular member	1992
Gheorghe Dolgu	1929–2017	economist	honorary member	2010
Vintila Dongoroz	1893–1983	jurist	corresponding member	1948
Nicolae N. Donici	1874–1956	astronomer	honorary member	1922
Toma Dordea	1921–2015	engineer	titular member	1994
Gleb Drăgan	1920–2014	engineer	titular member	2004
Mihai Corneliu Drăgănescu	1929–2010	engineer	titular member	1990
Nicolae Drăganu	1884–1939	philologist, linguist, lexicographer, literary historian	titular member	1939
Matei Drăghiceanu	1844–1939	engineer, geologist	honorary member	1933
Virgil N. Drăghiceanu	1879–1964	historian	corresponding member	1926
Sabin V. Drăgoi	1894–1968	composer, folklorist	corresponding member	1955
Silviu Dragomir	1888–1962	historian, politician	titular member	1928
Mihail Dragomirescu	1868–1942	esthetician, literary critic	honorary member	1938
Lazăr Dragoș	1930–2009	mathematician	titular member	1992
Coriolan Drăgulescu	1907–1977	chemist	titular member	1963
Constantin Drâmbă	1907–1997	astronomer, mathematician	titular member	1990
Dan Dubină	1950 –	engineer	titular member	2015
Ioan Dumitrache	1940 –	engineer energetician	titular member	2017
Dumitru Dumitrescu	1904–1984	engineer	titular member	1963
Geo (Gheorghe) V. Dumitrescu	1920–2004	writer	corresponding member	1993
Sorin Dumitrescu	1946 –	painter	corresponding member	2006
Zoe Dumitrescu-Bușulenga	1920–2006	philologist	titular member	1990
Nicolae Edroiu	1939 –2018	historian	corresponding member	1999
Victor Eftimiu	1889–1972	writer	titular member	1948
Mircea Eliade	1907–1986	philosopher, essayist, romancier	posthumous member	1990
Pompiliu Eliade	1869–1914	literary historian	corresponding member	1912
Alexandru Elian	1910–1998	historian	titular member	1993
Jacques H. Elias	1844–1923	banker	posthumous member	1993
Grigore Eliescu	1898–1975	entomology	corresponding member	1948
Elisabeta (Paula Ottilia Elisa) (Carmen Sylva) de Neuwied	1843–1916	queen, writer	honorary member	1881
Mihai Eminescu	1850–1889	writer	posthumous member	1948
David Emmanuel	1854–1941	mathematician	honorary member	1936
George Enescu	1881–1955	composer, violinist, pianist, conductor, educator	titular member	1932
Ioan Enescu	1884–1972	physician	titular member	1955
Dumitru Enescu	1930-2012	physicist	honorary member	2011
Constantin Erbiceanu	1838–1913	historian	titular member	1899
Vespasian Erbiceanu	1863–1943	jurist	corresponding member	1932
Constantin Esarcu	1836–1898	naturalist, physician, politician	corresponding member	1884
Ion Făgărășanu	1900–1987	physician	titular member	1963
Ștefan Fălcoianu	1835–1905	general, mathematician, historian	titular member	1876
Anastasie Fătu	1816–1886	physician, botanist	titular member	1871
Iacob Felix	1832–1905	physician	titular member	1879
Ferdinand (Victor Adalbert Meinard) de Hohenzollern-Sigmaringen	1865–1927	king	honorary member	1890
Florin Gheorghe Filip	1947 –	engineer	titular member	1999
Gheorghe Em. Filipescu	1885–1937	engineer	corresponding member	1936
Ion P. Filipescu	1927–2002	jurist	titular member	1993
Miltiade Filipescu	1901–1993	geologist, paleontologist	titular member	1963
Ioan Constantin Filitti	1879–1945	historian, jurist, diplomat	corresponding member	1915
Mircea Flonta	1932 –	philosopher	corresponding member	1992
Maria Luiza Flonta	1944 –	biologist	corresponding member	2011
Mihail Florescu	1912–2000	chemical engineer	corresponding member	1974
Mircea Florian	1888–1960	philosopher	posthumous member	1990
Ciprian Foias	1933–2020	mathematician	honorary member	1994
Octavian Fodor	1913–1976	physician	titular member	1974
Gheorghe Marin Fontanin	1825–1886	professor	titular member	1870
George Fotino	1896–1969	jurist, historian	corresponding member	1945
Petre T. Frangopol	1933-2020	chemist	honorary member	2012
Iustin Ștefan Frățiman	1870–1927	historian	corresponding member	1919
Erwin M. Friedländer	1925–2004	physicist	honorary member	2003
Gábor Gaál	1891–1954	publicist, esthetician, literary critic	titular member	1948
Gala Galaction	1879–1961	writer	titular member	1947
Ernő Gáll	1917–2000	philosopher	corresponding member	1974
Nicolae Gane	1838–1916	writer	titular member	1908
Zeno Gârban	1939 -	chemist	corresponding member	2011
Moses Gaster	1856–1939	philologist, literary historian, folklorist	honorary member	1929
Iulian P. Gavăț	1900–1978	engineer, geologist	corresponding member	1955
Mihai Gavrilă	1929 -	physicist	corresponding member	1974
Constantin C. Georgescu	1898–1968	engineer silvic, zooentomolog, fitopatolog	corresponding member	1948
George Georgescu	1887–1964	conductor	corresponding member	1963
Pimen Georgescu	1853–1934	metropolitan	honorary member	1918
Valentin Al. Georgescu	1908–1995	jurist, legal historian	titular member	1992
Dionisie Germani (Ghermani)	1877–1948	engineer	honorary member	1945
Dimitrie Gerota	1867–1939	physician	corresponding member	1916
Iosif Gheorghian	1829–1909	metropolitan	honorary member	1901
Constantin V. Gheorghiu	1894–1956	chemist	corresponding member	1955
Ion (Alin) Gheorghiu	1929–2001	painter	titular member	1999
Ion S. Gheorghiu	1885–1968	engineer	titular member	1952
Mihnea Gheorghiu	1919–2011	writer, translator, cineast	titular member	1996
Traian Gheorghiu	1887–1968	physicist	corresponding member	1948
Valentin Gheorghiu	1928–2023	pianist and composer	corresponding member	2014
Vasile Gheorghiu	1872–1959	professor theologist	honorary member	1938
Leonida Gherasim	1929–	physician	honorary member	2001
Vasile Gheție	1903–1990	veterinary	titular member	1990
Gheorghe Ghibănescu	1864–1936	historian, philologist	corresponding member	1905
Onisifor Ghibu	1883–1972	educator, politician	corresponding member	1919
Alexandru Ghica	1902–1964	mathematician	titular member	1963
Ion Ghica	1816–1897	writer, economist, politician	titular member	1874
Nicolae Ghica-Budești	1869–1943	architect	honorary member	1937
Ștefan Ghika-Budești	1904–1959	geologist	corresponding member	1955
Nicolae Ghilezan	1938 -	physician	corresponding member	2000
Vasile Gionea	1914–1999	jurist	honorary member	1993
Nicolae Giosan	1921–1990	engineer agronomist	titular member	1974
George Giuglea	1884–1967	linguist	corresponding member	1936
Constantin C. Giurescu	1901–1977	historian	titular member	1974
Constantin Giurescu	1875–1918	historian	titular member	1914
Dinu C. Giurescu	1927-2018	historian	titular member	2001
Margareta Giurgea	1915–1912	physicist	titular member	1992
Victor Giurgiu	1930 -	engineer silvic	titular member	2009
Dan Giușcă	1904–1988	geologist	titular member	1974
Răzvan Givulescu	1920–2007	geologist, paleobotanist	honorary member	1993
Virgil Gligor	1918–1977	veterinary	corresponding member	1963
Octavian Goga	1881–1938	poet, publicist, politician	titular member	1919
Constantin Gogu	1854–1897	mathematician, astronomer	corresponding member	1889
Iosif Goldiș	1836–1902	bishop	corresponding member	1882
Vasile Goldiș	1862–1934	politician	honorary member	1919
Marian Traian Gomoiu	1936-2021	biologist, oceanologist	titular member	2015
Ștefan Gonata	1838–1896	agronomist, politician	founding member	1867
Paul Gore	1875–1927	historian	honorary member	1919
Arthur Gorovei	1864–1951	folklorist, ethnographer	honorary member	1940
Grigore Grădișteanu	1816–1892	translator, politician	honorary member	1879
Petru Grădișteanu	1839–1921	publicist, politician	honorary member	1883
Alexandru Graur	1900–1988	linguist	titular member	1955
Dimitrie Grecescu	1841–1910	botanist, physician	titular member	1907
Ștefan Dimitrie Grecianu	1825–1908	historian	honorary member	1905
Vasile Grecu	1885–1972	philologist	corresponding member	1936
Dan Grigorescu	1931–2008	critic, art historian	titular member	2004
Lucian Grigorescu	1894–1965	painter	corresponding member	1948
Nicolae Grigorescu	1838–1907	painter	honorary member	1899
Radu Grigorovici	1911–2008	physicist	titular member	1990
Constantin I. Gulian	1914–2011	philosopher	titular member	1955
Marius Guran	1936 -2019	engineer	honorary member	2011
Dimitrie Gusti	1880–1955	sociologist, philosopher, esthetician	titular member	1919
Mihail Gușuleac	1887–1960	botanist	corresponding member	1937
Valeria Guțu Romalo	1928 -	linguist	honorary member	2006
Ionel Haiduc	1937 -	chemist	titular member	1991
Mendel Haimovici	1906–1973	mathematician	titular member	1963
Pantelimon (Pan) Halippa	1883–1979	publicist, politician	corresponding member	1918
Constantin N. Hamangiu	1869–1932	jurist	honorary member	1930
Nicolae Dragoș Hâncu	1940 -	physician	honorary member	2011
Peter Hänggi	1950 -	physicist	honorary member	2015
Spiru Haret	1851–1912	mathematician, sociologist, educator, politician	titular member	1892
Constantin N. Hârjeu	1856–1928	general, engineer	corresponding member	1909
Bogdan Petriceicu Hasdeu	1838–1907	philologist, writer, folklorist, historian, publicist	titular member	1877
Alexandru Hasdeu (Hâjdeu)	1811–1872	writer, professor	founding member	1866
Cornel Hațegan	1940 -	physicist	corresponding member	1992
Emil Hațieganu	1878–1959	jurist	honorary member	1945
Iuliu Hațieganu	1885–1959	physician	titular member	1955
Dan Hăulică	1932-2014	essayist literar, art critic	corresponding member	1993
Ioan D. Haulica	1924-2010	physician	titular member	1994
Ștefan Hepites	1851–1922	physicist, meteorologist	titular member	1902
Cristian Ioan D. Hera	1933 -	engineer	titular member	2004
Keith Hitchins	1931–2020	historian	honorary member	1991
Enea Hodoș	1858–1945	folklorist, writer	corresponding member	1904
Iosif Hodoș	1829–1880	historian, politician	founding member	1866
Maria Holban	1901–1991	historian	corresponding member	1990
Nicolae Hortolomei	1885–1961	physician	titular member	1948
Iuliu Hossu	1885–1970	bishop	honorary member	1945
Ioan Huber-Panu	1904–1974	engineer geologist	corresponding member	1955
Horia Hulubei	1896–1972	physicist	titular member	1946
Alexandru Hurmuzachi	1823–1871	publicist, politician	founding member	1866
Constantin N. Hurmuzachi	1863–1937	entomology	honorary member	1919
Eudoxiu Hurmuzachi	1812–1874	historian	titular member	1872
Nicolae Hurmuzachi	1826–1909	politician	honorary member	1883
Dragomir Hurmuzescu	1865–1954	physicist	corresponding member	1916
Caius Iacob	1912–1992	mathematician	titular member	1963
Simion Iagnov	1892–1958	physician	corresponding member	1948
Aurel Gh. Iancu	1928 -	economist	titular member	2001
Ion Ianoși	1928-2016	philosopher	honorary member	2001
Virgil Ianovici	1900–1990	geologist	titular member	1990
Garabet Ibrăileanu	1871–1936	critic, literary historian	posthumous member	1948
Dorin Ieșan	1941 -	mathematician	corresponding member	2001
Constantin C. Iliescu	1892–1978	physician	titular member	1965
Ion Inculeț	1884–1940	politician	titular member	1918
Grigore L. Ioachim	1906–1979	engineer	corresponding member	1963
George Ioanid	1800–1888	professor	honorary member	1871
Traian Ionascu	1897–1981	jurist	titular member	1974
Constantin N. Ionescu	1905–1956	chemist, pharmacist	corresponding member	1948
Grigore Ionescu	1904–1992	architect	titular member	1992
Ion Bizet Ionescu	1870–1946	engineer, mathematician	corresponding member	1919
Mihail Andrei Ionescu	1900–1988	entomologist	corresponding member	1955
Mircea Ionescu	1896–1980	chemist	corresponding member	1963
Nicolae Ionescu	1820–1905	publicist, politician	founding member	1867
Theodor D. Ionescu	1898–1990	chemical engineer	corresponding member	1963
Theodor V. Ionescu	1899–1988	physicist	titular member	1963
Thoma Ionescu	1860–1926	physician	honorary member	1925
Vlad Ionescu	1938–2000	engineer	corresponding member	1996
Ion Ionescu (de la Brad)	1818–1891	agronomist, economist, writer	honorary member	1884
Ioan Ionescu-Dolj	1875–1947	jurist	corresponding member	1928
George Ionescu-Gion	1857–1904	historian, publicist	corresponding member	1889
Constantin Ionescu-Mihăești	1883–1962	physician	titular member	1945
Gheorghe Ionescu-Sisești	1885–1967	agronomist	titular member	1936
Nicolae Ionescu-Șișești	1888–1954	physician	corresponding member	1939
Constantin Ionescu-Târgoviște	1937 -	physician	corresponding member	2003
Liviu Ionesi	1925–2006	geologist	titular member	2003
Constantin Ionete	1922–2011	economist	honorary member	1993
Iorgu Iordan	1888–1986	linguist, philologist	titular member	1945
Nicolae Iorga	1871–1940	historian, publicist, writer, politician	titular member	1910
Marius Iosifescu	1936 -2020	mathematician	titular member	2000
Ion Irimescu	1903–2005	sculptor	honorary member	1992
Emil Isac	1886–1954	poet	corresponding member	1948
Dumitru A. Isăcescu	1904–1977	chemist	corresponding member	1955
Mugur Constantin Isărescu	1949 -	economist	titular member	2006
Iosif Iser	1881–1958	painter, illustrator	titular member	1955
Sabina Cornelia Ispas	1941 -	etnolog	titular member	2009
Constantin I. Istrati	1850–1918	chemist, physician	titular member	1899
Nicolae Ivan	1855–1936	bishop	honorary member	1934
Gheorghe Ivănescu	1912–1987	linguist	corresponding member	1965
Eugeniu Ivanov	1933 -	physicist	corresponding member	1996
Zsigmond (Sigismund) Jakó Pal	1916–2008	historian	honorary member	1996
Ion Jalea	1887–1983	sculptor	titular member	1963
Eugen Jebeleanu	1911–1991	poet, translator, publicist	titular member	1974
Vasile Petre Jitariu	1905–1989	biologist	titular member	1974
Athanase Joja	1904–1972	philosopher, logician	titular member	1955
Mihail Jora	1891–1971	composer, conductor	titular member	1955
Ioan Jak Rene Juvara	1913–1996	physician	honorary member	1992
Ioan Kalinderu	1840–1913	jurist, publicist	titular member	1893
Nicolae Kalinderu	1835–1902	physician	corresponding member	1890
August Kanitz	1843–1896	botanist	corresponding member	1882
Constantin Karadja	1889–1950	historian, bibliographer, bibliofil	honorary member	1946
Wilhelm Karl W. Knechtel	1884–1967	entomologist	titular member	1955
Gheorghe T. Kirileanu	1872–1960	folklorist	honorary member	1948
Costin Kirițescu	1908–2002	economist	titular member	1992
Gustav-Oswald Kisch	1889–1938	pastor, philologist	honorary member	1933
Mihail Kogălniceanu	1817–1891	historian, writer, publicist, politician	titular member	1868
Arthur Kreindler	1900–1988	physician	titular member	1948
Constantin A. Kretzulescu	1809–1884	politician	honorary member	1871
Nicolae Kretzulescu	1812–1900	physician, politician	titular member	1871
Constantin Lacea	1875–1950	philologist, linguist	honorary member	1939
Gheorghe I. Lahovary	1838–1909	engineer, writer	honorary member	1901
Traian Lalescu	1882–1929	mathematician	posthumous member	1991
Scarlat Lambrino	1891–1964	historian	corresponding member	1934
Alexandru Lambrior	1845–1883	philologist, folklorist	corresponding member	1882
Alexandru Lapedatu	1876–1950	historian, politician	titular member	1918
Ion Lapedatu	1876–1951	economist, politician	honorary member	1936
Aladár Lászlóffy	1937–2009	poet, writer	corresponding member	2003
August Treboniu Laurian	1810–1881	philologist, historian, publicist, politician	founding member	1867
Dimitrie August Laurian	1846–1906	ziarist, literary critic	corresponding member	1877
Barbu Lăzăreanu	1881–1957	literary historian, publicist	titular member	1948
Constantin Levaditi	1874–1953	inframicrobiologist	honorary member	1926
Dinu Lipatti	1917–1950	pianist, composer, educator	posthumous member	1997
Jean Livescu	1906–1996	literary historian	corresponding member	1965
Scarlat Longhin	1899–1979	general physician	corresponding member	1963
Gheorghe Gh. Longinescu	1869–1939	chemist	honorary member	1936
Stefan Gh. Longinescu	1865–1931	jurist	corresponding member	1910
Eugen Lovinescu	1881–1943	critic, literary historian, writer	posthumous member	1991
Ștefan Luchian	1868–1916	painter	posthumous member	1948
Ioan Lupaș	1880–1967	historian, politician	titular member	1916
Gheorghe O. Lupașcu	1908–1979	parazitolog	corresponding member	1948
Ștefan Lupașcu (Lupasco)	1900–1988	philosopher	posthumous member	1991
Voicu Lupei	1938 -	physicist	corresponding member	2009
Nicolae Gh. Lupu	1884–1966	physician	titular member	1948
Constantin Macarovici	1902–1984	chemist	corresponding member	1955
Neculai Macarovici	1901–1979	geologist, paleontologist	corresponding member	1974
Vasile Maciu	1904–1981	historian	corresponding member	1963
Gheorghe Macovei	1880–1969	geologist	titular member	1939
Eugen Macovschi	1906–1985	biochemist, biologist	titular member	1948
Dimitrie Macrea	1907–1988	linguist	corresponding member	1965
Virgil Traian Madgearu	1887–1940	economist, sociologist, politician	posthumous member	1990
Titu Liviu Maiorescu	1840–1917	literary critic, esthetician, politician	founding member	1867
Ovidiu Maitec	1925–2007	sculptor	titular member	1999
Ileana (Elena) Mălăncioiu	1940 -	poet	corresponding member	2013
Vasile Malinschi	1912–1992	economist	titular member	1955
Mircea Malița	1927-2018	mathematician, diplomat, essayist	titular member	1991
Rodica Mănăilă	1935–2002	physicist	corresponding member	1992
Gheorghe Manea	1904–1978	engineer	corresponding member	1963
Dimitrie Ioan Mangeron	1906–1991	mathematician	corresponding member	1990
Simeon Mangiuca	1831–1890	folklorist	honorary member	1890
Vasile Mangra	1850–1918	metropolitan	titular member	1909
Adrian Maniu	1891–1968	writer	corresponding member	1933
Iuliu Maniu	1873–1953	politician	honorary member	1919
Vasile Maniu	1824–1901	publicist, historian, writer	titular member	1876
Constantin Manolache	1906–1977	entomology	corresponding member	1955
Nicolae I. Manolescu	1907–1993	engineer	corresponding member	1991
Nicolae M. Manolescu	1936 -	veterinary	corresponding member	1992
Nicolae Manolescu	1939 - 2024	critic, literary historian, essayist, writer	titular member	2013
Sabin Manuilă	1894–1964	physician, demographer, statistician	corresponding member	1938
Alexandru Marcu	1894–1955	professor	corresponding member	1940
Duiliu Marcu	1885–1966	architect	titular member	1955
Solomon Marcus	1925 – 2016	mathematician	titular member	2001
Apostol Mărgărit	1836–1903	educator	corresponding member	1889
Viorel Mărginean	1933 -2022	painter	honorary member	2006
Maria Alexandra Victoria de Saxa Coburg	1875–1938	queen	honorary member	1915
Simeon Florea Marian	1847–1907	folklorist, ethnographer	titular member	1881
Atanasie Marian Marienescu	1830–1914	folklorist, ethnographer, writer	titular member	1881
Constantin Marinescu	1891–1982	historian	corresponding member	1928
Gheorghe Marinescu	1919–1987	mathematician	titular member	1974
Gheorghe Marinescu	1863–1938	physician	titular member	1905
Matei G. Marinescu	1903–1983	engineer	corresponding member	1948
Voinea Marinescu	1915–1973	physician	corresponding member	1963
Matilda Caragiu Marioțeanu	1927–2009	linguist	titular member	2004
Vasile Mârza	1902–1995	physician, biologist	titular member	1948
Ion C. Massimu	1825–1877	linguist	founding member	1867
Cristea Mateescu	1894–1979	engineer	titular member	1974
Dan Mateescu	1911–2008	engineer	titular member	1974
Ilie Matei	1895–1969	chemist	corresponding member	1955
Ion Gheorghe Maurer	1902–2000	jurist, politician	titular member	1955
Constantin Maximilian	1928–1997	physician	corresponding member	1992
Octav Mayer	1895–1966	mathematician	titular member	1955
Dan Horea Mazilu	1943–2008	literary historian	corresponding member	2001
Panaite C. Mazilu	1915-2015	engineer	honorary member	1993
Cornel Medrea	1889–1964	sculptor	corresponding member	1955
Simion Mehedinți	1868–1962	geographer	titular member	1915
Constantin Meissner	1854–1942	educator, politician	honorary member	1934
Jószef Meliusz	1909–1995	writer	corresponding member	1974
Benedict M. Menkes	1904–1987	physician, biologist	corresponding member	1952
Victor Mercea	1924–1987	physicist	corresponding member	1963
Ioan G. Meșotă	1837–1878	professor	corresponding member	1877
Stefan Metes	1887–1977	historian	corresponding member	1919
Corneliu Micloși	1887–1963	engineer	titular member	1955
Haralambie Mihăescu	1907–1985	linguist, philologist	corresponding member	1965
Michael I of Romania	1921 -2017	king	honorary member	2007
Gheorghe Mihăilă	1930–2011	linguist, literary historian	titular member	2004
Mihai N. Mihăilă	1948 -	engineer	corresponding member	1999
Vintilă M. Mihăilescu	1890–1978	geographer	titular member	1974
Ioan Mihaly (de Apsa)	1844–1914	historian	corresponding member	1901
Victor Mihaly (de Apsa)	1841–1918	metropolitan	honorary member	1894
Gheorghe Mihoc	1906–1981	mathematician	titular member	1963
Ștefan-Marius Milcu	1903–1997	physician, biologist, anthropologist	titular member	1948
Ștefan Minovici	1867–1935	chemist	corresponding member	1925
Radu Miron	1927 -2022	mathematician	titular member	1993
Athanasie Mironescu	1856–1931	metropolitan	honorary member	1909
Petru Th. Missir	1856–1929	jurist, literary critic, publicist	honorary member	1926
Petru Mocanu	1931 – 2016	mathematician	titular member	2009
Andrei Mocioni	1812–1880	jurist	founding member	1866
Aurel Moga	1903–1977	physician	titular member	1955
Constantin Moisil	1876–1958	historian	honorary member	1948
Grigore Moisil	1906–1973	mathematician	titular member	1948
Iuliu Moisil	1859–1947	publicist	honorary member	1943
Iuliu Moldovan	1882–1966	physician	corresponding member	1920
Roman Moldovan	1911–1996	economist, sociologist	titular member	1990
Ioan (Micu) Moldovanu	1833–1915	theologist, historian, folklorist, philologist, educator	titular member	1894
Tiberiu I. Morariu	1905–1982	geographer	corresponding member	1955
Ioan Moraru	1927–1989	physician	posthumous member	1990
Alexandru Mihail Morega	1955 -	engineer	corresponding member	2012
George G. Moronescu	1874–1949	jurist, politician	honorary member	1939
Constantin Motaș	1891–1980	zoologist	titular member	1948
Mircea D. Moțoc	1916–2006	engineer agronomist	titular member	1990
Ludovic Mrazec	1867–1944	geologist, petrographer	titular member	1905
Basil Munteanu	1897–1972	literary historian, comparatist	corresponding member	1939
Dan Munteanu	1937 -	biologist	corresponding member	1999
Gavriil Munteanu	1812–1869	scholar, translator	founding member	1866
Ion Munteanu	1938 -	physician, obstetrician	honorary member	2004
Nicodim Munteanu	1864–1948	patriarch	honorary member	1918
Sterian Munteanu	1918–1990	silvicultor	corresponding member	1974
Gheorghe Munteanu-Murgoci	1872–1925	geologist, geographer, pedolog	corresponding member	1923
Dumitru Murariu	1940 -	biologist	corresponding member	2006
Lucian Mureșan	1931 -	cardinal, arhibishop	honorary member	2012
Camil Bujor Mureșanu	1927-2015	historian	titular member	2000
Iacob Mureșianu	1812–1887	publicist, poet, politician	honorary member	1877
Gheorghe Murgeanu	1901–1984	geologist	titular member	1955
Costin Murgescu	1919–1989	economist	corresponding member	1963
Ilie G. Murgulescu	1902–1991	chemist	titular member	1952
George Murnu	1868–1957	writer, historian	titular member	1923
Geavit Musa	1931–2010	physicist	corresponding member	2009
Ion Muslea	1899–1966	folklorist	corresponding member	1947
Alexandru Myller	1879–1965	mathematician	honorary member	1938
Ștefan Nădășan	1901–1967	engineer	titular member	1963
István Nagy	1904–1977	writer	titular member	1974
Iosif Naniescu	1820–1902	metropolitan, scholar	honorary member	1888
Marius Nasta	1890–1965	physician	titular member	1955
Constantin Năstasescu	1943 -	mathematician	corresponding member	1993
Anton Naum	1829–1917	poet	titular member	1893
Fănuș Neagu	1932–2011	writer	titular member	2001
Theodor Anton Neagu	1932 -2017	paleontologist	titular member	2001
Olga Necrasov	1910–2000	anthropologist	titular member	1990
Anton Alexandru Necșulea	1908–1993	engineer	honorary member	1993
Dumitru Theodor Neculuță	1859–1904	poet	posthumous member	1948
Dimitrie Negreanu	1858–1908	physicist	corresponding member	1893
Traian Negrescu	1900–1960	engineer	titular member	1955
Emil Alexandru Negruțiu	1911–1988	engineer agronomist	corresponding member	1974
Costache (Constantin) Negruzzi	1808–1868	writer	founding member	1867
Iacob C. Negruzzi	1842–1932	writer	titular member	1881
Paul Negulescu	1874–1946	jurist	honorary member	1936
Petre P. Negulescu	1872–1951	philosopher, politician	titular member	1936
Costin D. Nenițescu	1902–1970	chemist	titular member	1955
Ioan S. Nenițescu	1854–1901	poet	corresponding member	1896
Ion Nestor	1905–1974	historian, archeologist	corresponding member	1955
Nicolae Nestorescu	1901–1969	physician	corresponding member	1963
Nicolae de Hohenzollern-Sigmaringen	1903–1978	principe	honorary member	1929
Constantin S. Nicolaescu-Plopșor	1900–1968	archeologist, historian, ethnographer, folklorist, anthropologist, geographer	corresponding member	1963
Constantin T. Nicolau	1897–1973	physician	corresponding member	1963
Gheorghe Nicolau	1886–1950	engineer	titular member	1948
Ion Nicolau	1885–1963	physician	corresponding member	1955
Ștefan Gh. Nicolau	1874–1970	physician	honorary member	1948
Ștefan S. Nicolau	1896–1967	physician	titular member	1948
Mariana Nicolesco	1948 -	artist liric	honorary member	1993
Miron Nicolescu	1903–1975	mathematician	titular member	1955
Gheorghe Niculescu	1923–1995	general-locotenent, physician	honorary member	1992
Ion T. Niculescu	1895–1957	physician	corresponding member	1955
Oscar Niculescu	1860–1939	jurist	honorary member	1934
Ștefan Niculescu	1927–2008	composer, musicologist	titular member	1996
Paul Helmut Niedermaier	1937 -	historian, architect	corresponding member	2001
Ion I. Nistor	1876–1962	historian, politician	titular member	1915
Iuliu Nițulescu	1895–1975	physician	titular member	1955
Constantin Noica	1909–1987	philosopher	posthumous member	1990
Valeriu Novacu	1909–1992	physicist	corresponding member	1948
Erasmus Julius Nyárády	1881–1966	botanist	titular member	1948
Dumitru Oancea	1941 -	chemist	corresponding member	2009
Mihail (Gheorghiad) Obedenaru	1839–1885	physician, publicist, diplomat	corresponding member	1871
Hermann Oberth	1894–1980	physicist, mathematician, inventor	posthumous member	1991
Grigore Obrejanu	1911–1992	pedolog	titular member	1963
Alexandru Odobescu	1834–1895	writer, historian	titular member	1870
Ștefan Odobleja	1902–1978	physician	posthumous member	1990
Simion Oeriu	1902–1976	biochemist	corresponding member	1948
Gheorghe A. Olănescu	1905–1986	physician	corresponding member	1963
Dumitru C. Ollanescu-Ascanio	1849–1908	writer	titular member	1893
Mircea Olteanu	1926–2011	physician	honorary member	1992
Dimitrie Onciul	1856–1923	historian	titular member	1905
Octav Onicescu	1892–1983	mathematician	titular member	1965
Virgil Onițiu	1864–1915	writer	corresponding member	1902
George Oprescu	1881–1969	historian, critic, collector	honorary member	1948
Constantin C. Orghidan	1874–1944	engineer, collector	honorary member	1942
Teodor Oroveanu	1920–2005	engineer	corresponding member	1991
Giorgio Ugo Augosto Ostrogovich	1904–1984	chemist	corresponding member	1974
Andrei Oțetea	1894–1977	historian	titular member	1955
Ion Paun Otiman	1942 -	engineer, agronomist, economist	titular member	1999
Ion Pacea	1924–1999	painter	honorary member	1993
Zenobie Pâclișanu	1886–1958	theologistist, historian	corresponding member	1919
Mircea Păcurariu	1932 -2021	theology professor, historian	corresponding member	1997
Doru Pamfil	1953 -	engineer agronomist	corresponding member	2009
Petre P. Panaitescu	1900–1967	historian, philologist	corresponding member	1934
Scarlat Panaitescu	1867–1938	general	corresponding member	1919
Dimitrie S. Panaitescu-Perpessicius	1891–1971	critic, literary historian, poet	titular member	1955
Nicolae Panin	1938 -	engineer geologist	titular member	2015
Emanoil Pantazi	1870–1942	jurist	honorary member	1929
Cezar Papacostea	1886–1936	writer, translator	corresponding member	1935
Șerban Papacostea	1928-2018	historian	corresponding member	1990
Alexandru Papadopol-Calimah	1833–1898	historian, publicist, politician	titular member	1876
Pericle Papahagi	1872–1943	philologist, linguist, folklorist	corresponding member	1916
Alexandru Papiu-Ilarian	1828–1877	historian, philologist	titular member	1868
Ioan P. Papp	1878–1959	jurist	honorary member	1946
Constantin I. Parhon	1874–1969	physician	titular member	1939
Vasile Pârvan	1882–1927	archeologist, historian	titular member	1913
Ilie Pârvu	1941 -	philosopher	corresponding member	1992
Constantin Pârvulescu	1890–1945	astronomer	posthumous member	1991
Ștefan Pașca	1901–1957	linguist, philologist	corresponding member	1955
Ștefan Pascu	1914–1998	historian	titular member	1974
Nicolae N. Patraulea	1916–2007	engineer	titular member	1990
Nicolae Paulescu	1869–1931	physician	posthumous member	1990
Gheorghe Păun	1950 -	mathematician	corresponding member	2012
Ion Păun-Pincio	1868–1894	writer	posthumous member	1948
Ionel S. Pavel	1897–1991	physician	titular member	1990
Vasile Pavelcu	1900–1991	psiholog	titular member	1974
Marius Sabin Peculea	1926-2023	engineer	titular member	1993
Vespasian V. Pella	1897–1960	jurist, diplomat	corresponding member	1941
Corneliu I. Penescu	1919 - 1982	engineer	corresponding member	1963
Laurentiu-Stefan Peterfi	1937 -	biologist-botanist	corresponding member	2003
Stefan Péterfi	1906–1978	botanist	titular member	1963
Gheorghe Petrașcu	1872–1949	painter	titular member	1936
Camil Petrescu	1894–1957	writer	titular member	1948
Cezar Petrescu	1892–1961	writer	titular member	1955
Nicolae Petrescu	1886–1954	philosopher, sociologist	corresponding member	1945
Paul C. Petrescu	1915–1977	physicist	titular member	1974
Zaharia Petrescu	1841–1901	general, physician	corresponding member	1885
Mircea Stelian Petrescu	1933 -2020	engineer	honorary member	2006
Mircea Petrescu-Dîmbovita	1915-2013	historian, archeologist	titular member	1996
Dimitrie Petrino	1838–1878	poet	corresponding member	1877
Emil Petrovici	1899–1968	linguist, folklorist	titular member	1948
Ion Petrovici	1882–1972	philosopher, writer, politician	titular member	1934
Nicolae S. Petrulian	1902–1983	geologist	titular member	1963
Alexandru A. Philippide	1900–1979	writer, translator	titular member	1963
Alexandru Philippide	1859–1933	linguist, philologist	titular member	1900
Ion Pillat	1891–1945	poet, translator	corresponding member	1936
Dionisie M. Pippidi	1905–1993	archeologist, epigrapher, historian	titular member	1990
Andrei Nicolae Pippidi	1948 -	historian	corresponding member	2012
Antonie Plămădeală	1926–2005	metropolitan	honorary member	1992
Gheorghe Platon	1926–2006	historian	titular member	1993
George Plopu	1857–1940	jurist	honorary member	1934
Petrache Poenaru	1799–1875	engineer, mathematician, inventor, educator	titular member	1870
Gheorghe A. Polizu	1819–1886	physician	honorary member	1871
Dimitrie D. Pompeiu	1873–1954	mathematician	titular member	1934
Petru Poni	1841–1925	chemist, mineralogy	titular member	1879
Emil Pop	1897–1974	botanist	titular member	1955
Gavriil Pop	1818–1883	priest, historian	corresponding member	1871
Ioan-Aurel Pop	1955 -	historian	titular member	2010
Mihai Pop	1907–2000	folklorist, etnolog	honorary member	2000
Traian Pop	1885–1960	jurist	honorary member	1948
Constantin Popa	1938 -	physician	titular member	2003
Grigore T. Popa	1892–1948	physician	corresponding member	1936
Irineu Popa	1957 -	archbishop, metropolitan	honorary member	2010
Gheorghe Popa-Lisseanu	1866–1945	historian	corresponding member	1919
Nicolae Popea	1826–1908	bishop, historian, scholar	titular member	1899
Alexe Popescu	1927–1974	chemical engineer	corresponding member	1974
Dumitru Popescu	1929–2010	priest, professor	honorary member	2001
Dumitru-Radu Popescu	1935 -2023	writer	titular member	2006
Ioan Popescu	1832–1892	educator	corresponding member	1877
Ioan-Ioviț Popescu	1932 -	physicist	titular member	1990
Laurențiu Mircea Popescu	1944 -	physician	titular member	2001
Nicolae Popescu	1937–2010	mathematician	corresponding member	1997
Niculae M. Popescu	1881–1963	priest, historian	titular member	1923
Octavian Popescu	1951 -	biologist	titular member	2010
Ștefan Popescu	1872–1948	painter, desenator	honorary member	1936
Tudor R. Popescu	1913–2004	jurist	honorary member	1993
Valerian C. Popescu	1912 -2013	physician	corresponding member	1963
Emilian Popescu	1928-2020	historian	honorary member	2006
Ion Gh. Popescu-Zeletin	1907–1974	engineer silvic	corresponding member	1955
Lucia-Doina Popov	1943 -	biochemist	titular member	2011
Vasile-Mihai Popov	1928 -	engineer	corresponding member	1963
Călin Popovici	1910–1977	astronomer, astrophysicist, geodesist	posthumous member	1990
Constantin C. Popovici	1878–1956	mathematician, astronomer	honorary member	1946
Eusebiu Popovici	1838–1922	priest, professor	honorary member	1908
Gheorghe Popovici	1863–1905	historian	corresponding member	1905
Gheorghe Popovici	1862–1927	priest	corresponding member	1909
Ilie T. Popovici	1902–1982	veterinary	corresponding member	1955
Titus Popovici	1930–1994	writer	corresponding member	1974
Tiberiu Popoviciu	1906–1975	mathematician	titular member	1963
Eugen A. Pora	1909–1981	zoologist, ecophysiologist, oceanographer	titular member	1963
Florian Porcius	1816–1906	botanist	titular member	1882
Marius Porumb	1943 -	art historian	titular member	2009
Tudorel Postolache	1932 -2020	economist	titular member	1990
Marin Preda	1922–1980	writer	corresponding member	1974
Victor Preda	1912–1982	biologist	titular member	1974
Constantin Prezan	1861–1943	maresal	honorary member	1923
Alexandru Priadcencu	1902–1981	engineer agronomist	corresponding member	1952
Alexandru Proca	1897–1955	physicist	posthumous member	1990
Eugeniu Gh. Proca	1927–2004	physician	honorary member	1992
Ștefan Procopiu	1890–1972	physicist	titular member	1955
Alexe Procopovici	1884–1946	linguist, philologist	corresponding member	1919
David Prodan	1902–1992	historian	titular member	1955
Iuliu Prodan	1875–1959	botanist	corresponding member	1955
Nicolae Profiri	1886–1967	engineer	titular member	1948
Dumitru Protase	1926-2022	historian	honorary member	2003
Dumitru-Dorin Prunariu	1952 -	engineer	honorary member	2011
Ilarion Pușcariu	1842–1922	educator, historian	honorary member	1916
Ioan Pușcariu	1824–1911	historian, writer	titular member	1900
Sextil Pușcariu	1877–1948	linguist, philologist	titular member	1914
Nicolae Ch. Quintescu	1841–1913	literary critic, philologist, translator	titular member	1877
Ion Rachmuth	1911–1990	economist	corresponding member	1955
Emil Racoviță	1868–1947	biologist	titular member	1920
Lothar Rădăceanu	1899–1955	politician	titular member	1955
Elie Radu	1853–1931	engineer	honorary member	1926
Vasile Gh. Radu	1903–1982	zoologist	corresponding member	1948
Ion Răducanu	1884–1964	economist, politician	corresponding member	1936
Alexandru D. Rădulescu	1886–1979	physician, writer	titular member	1955
Andrei Rădulescu	1880–1959	jurist, historian	titular member	1920
Constantin (Costin) Rădulescu	1932–2002	speleologist, paleontologist	corresponding member	1993
Dan P. Rădulescu	1928 -	geologist	titular member	1993
Eugen H. Rădulescu	1904–1993	engineer agronomist	titular member	1963
Gheorghe Aurelian Rădulescu	1907–2002	chemical engineer	honorary member	1992
Ion Heliade Rădulescu	1802–1872	writer, philologist, politician	founding member	1867
Nicolae Al. Rădulescu	1905–1989	geographer	corresponding member	1948
Constantin Rădulescu-Motru	1868–1957	philosopher, psiholog	titular member	1923
Ion A. Rădulescu-Pogoneanu	1870–1945	educator	corresponding member	1919
Remus Răduleț	1904–1984	engineer	titular member	1963
Francisc Rainer	1874–1944	physician, anthropologist	honorary member	1943
Mihai Ralea	1896–1964	sociologist, psychologist, essayist, politician	titular member	1948
Grigore Râmniceanu	1845–1915	physician	corresponding member	1890
Mihail M. Râmniceanu	1854–1915	engineer	corresponding member	1904
Victor Râmniceanu	1856–1933	jurist	honorary member	1923
Vasile Rășcanu	1885–1980	physician, fiziolog	titular member	1955
Alexandru Rău	1900–1993	engineer	honorary member	1993
Liviu Rebreanu	1885–1944	writer	titular member	1939
Vladimir, cavaler de Repta	1842–1926	metropolitan	honorary member	1919
Camil Ressu	1880–1962	painter	titular member	1955
Emanoil Riegler	1854–1929	physician, farmacolog	corresponding member	1904
Raluca Ripan	1894–1975	chemist	titular member	1948
Constantin F. Robescu	1839–1920	engineer agronomist	corresponding member	1871
Ioan Robu	1944 -	arhibishop	honorary member	2001
Mihai Roller	1908–1958	politician, historian	titular member	1948
Alexandru Roman	1826–1897	îndrumator cultural, publicist	founding member	1866
Visarion Roman	1833–1885	publicist, politician	corresponding member	1877
Dionisie Romano	1806–1873	bishop, scholar, translator	honorary member	1868
Alexandru Roșca	1906–1996	psiholog	titular member	1991
Dumitru D. Roșca	1895–1980	philosopher	titular member	1974
Mose David (Moses) Rosen	1912–1994	rabbi	honorary member	1992
Alexandru Rosetti	1895–1990	linguist, philologist	titular member	1948
Constantin A. Rosetti	1816–1885	writer, publicist, politician	founding member	1867
Radu R. Rosetti	1877–1949	general, historian	titular member	1934
Theodor G. Rosetti	1837–1923	publicist, politician	honorary member	1891
Viktor Roth	1874–1936	priest, historian	honorary member	1926
Ludovic Iosif Urban Rudescu	1908–1992	biologist	corresponding member	1963
Demostene Russo	1869–1938	philologist, historian	corresponding member	1919
Adrian Rusu	1946–2012	engineer	corresponding member	1994
Dragos Rusu	1910–1994	jurist	honorary member	1993
Mihail Sadoveanu	1880–1961	writer	titular member	1921
Oscar Sager	1894–1981	physician	titular member	1963
Andrei Șaguna	1808–1873	metropolitan	honorary member	1871
Alexandru Sahia	1908–1937	writer	posthumous member	1948
Victor Emanuel Sahini	1927-2017	chemist	titular member	1990
Marius Sala	1932 - 2018	linguist	titular member	2001
Traian Lorin Sălăgean	1929–1993	engineer	titular member	1990
Nicolae Sălăgeanu	1907–1988	botanist	titular member	1963
Alfons Oscar Saligny	1853–1903	chemist	corresponding member	1902
Anghel Saligny	1854–1925	engineer	titular member	1897
Ion Sălișteanu	1929–2011	painter	corresponding member	2006
Constantin Sandu-Aldea	1874–1927	engineer agronomist, writer	corresponding member	1919
Constantin A. Sandu-Ville	1897–1969	engineer agronomist	corresponding member	1955
Aureliu Emil Săndulescu	1932-2019	physicist	titular member	1992
Mircea Ioan Valentin Săndulescu	1933 -	engineer geologist	titular member	1994
Alexandru S. Sanielevici	1899–1969	physicist	corresponding member	1955
Simion Sanielevici	1870–1963	mathematician	honorary member	1948
Nicolae Saramandu	1941 –	linguist and philologist	corresponding member	2018
Theofil Sauciuc-Saveanu	1884–1971	historian	corresponding member	1945
Emilia Săulea	1904–1998	geologist	honorary member	1993
Nicolae N. Săulescu	1939 -	engineer	titular member	2009
Mircea Ion Savul	1895–1964	geologist, geochemist	titular member	1963
Alice Săvulescu	1905–1970	botanist	titular member	1963
Traian Săvulescu	1889–1963	botanist	titular member	1936
Ion G. Sbiera	1836–1916	folklorist, literary historian	founding member	1866
Horia Scutaru-Ungureanu	1943 -2014	physicist	titular member	1995
Eugen Segal	1933 -2013	chemist	titular member	2009
Mihail Șerban	1930–2004	biochemist	titular member	2001
Theodor Șerbănescu	1839–1901	poet	corresponding member	1894
Petre Sergescu	1893–1954	mathematician	corresponding member	1937
Ioan Silaghi-Dumitrescu	1950–2009	chemist	corresponding member	2006
Andrei P. Silard	1944–1993	engineer	corresponding member	1993
Gheorghe Silas	1914–2001	engineer	corresponding member	1991
Grigore Silasi	1836–1897	philologist, folklorist	honorary member	1877
Ion Alexandru Silberg	1937–2006	chemist	corresponding member	1996
Cristian Sorin Silvestru	1955 -	chemist	corresponding member	2009
Anca Volumnia Sima	1952 -	biophysicist	corresponding member	2004
Ioan Eugen Simion	1933 -	critic, literary historian	titular member	1992
Bogdan C. Simionescu	1948 -	chemist	titular member	2009
Cristofor I. Simionescu	1920–2007	chemical engineer	titular member	1963
Ion Th. Simionescu	1873–1944	geologist, paleontologist	titular member	1911
Maya Simionescu	1937 -	biologist	titular member	1991
Nicolae Simionescu	1926–1995	physician	titular member	1991
Marin Simionescu-Râmniceanu	1883–1964	critic, literary historian, writer	corresponding member	1919
Zeno Virgil Gheorghe Simon	1935 -2015	chemist	corresponding member	1997
Dan Simonescu	1902–1993	literary historian, bibliographer	honorary member	1992
Anastase Simu	1854–1935	art collector	honorary member	1933
Gheorghe Sin	1942 -2021	agronomist	corresponding member	2006
Ioanel Sinescu	1951 -	physician	titular member	2011
Ivan Singer	1929-2020	mathematician	titular member	2009
Gheorghe Sion	1822–1892	writer	titular member	1868
Tudor Sireteanu	1943 -	mathematician	corresponding member	2012
Victor Slăvescu	1891–1977	economist, politician	titular member	1939
Ioan Slavici	1848–1925	writer	corresponding member	1882
Nichita P. Smochina	1894–1980	jurist, historian, ethnographer, folklorist, politician	honorary member	1942
Mircea Socolescu	1902–1993	geologist, geophysicist	honorary member	1993
Matei Socor	1908–1980	composer, conductor	corresponding member	1952
Șerban C. Solacolu	1905–1980	chemical engineer	corresponding member	1963
Mihai Șora	1916–2023	philosopher, essayist	honorary member	2012
Marin Sorescu	1936–1996	writer	titular member	1992
Eugenia D. Soru	1901–1988	chemist	corresponding member	1955
Virgil Șotropa	1867–1954	professor	honorary member	1943
Gheorghe Spacu	1883–1955	chemist	titular member	1936
Petru George Spacu	1906–1995	chemist	titular member	1990
Petre Spânul	1894–1962	veterinary	corresponding member	1955
Tiberiu Spârchez	1899–1977	physician	corresponding member	1963
Theodor Dimitrie Speranția	1856–1929	writer, folklorist	corresponding member	1891
Victor Spinei	1943 -	historian, archeologist	titular member	2015
Henri H. Stahl	1901–1991	sociologist, jurist, historian	titular member	1990
Irimie Staicu	1905–1989	engineer agronomist, agrotechnician	corresponding member	1963
Constantin (Costache) Stamati	1786–1869	writer, translator	founding member	1866
Aurelian Stan	1910–2003	engineer	honorary member	1993
Ștefan Stâncă	1865–1897	physician	posthumous member	1948
Carol Stanciu	1937 -	physician, gastroenterologist	honorary member	2004
Dimitrie D. Stancu	1927–2014	mathematician	honorary member	1999
Zaharia Stancu	1902–1974	writer	titular member	1955
Nichita Stănescu	1933–1983	writer	posthumous member	1990
Vasile Stănescu	1925-2019	economist, jurist	honorary member	1999
Dumitru Stăniloae	1903–1993	priest, philosopher	titular member	1991
Gheorghe Ștefan	1899–1980	historian, archeologist	corresponding member	1952
Gheorghe Ștefan	1948 -	engineer electronist	corresponding member	2011
Teodor V. Ștefanelli	1849–1920	historian, writer	titular member	1910
Grigoriu Ștefănescu	1836–1911	geologist, paleontologist	titular member	1876
Melchisedec Ștefănescu	1823–1892	bishop, historian	titular member	1870
Sabba Ștefănescu	1857–1931	geologist, paleontologist	corresponding member	1893
Sabba S. Ștefănescu	1902–1994	geologist	titular member	1963
Stefan Ștefănescu	1929 -	historian	titular member	1992
Florian Ștefănescu-Goangă	1881–1958	psychologist	corresponding member	1937
Jean Alexandru Steriade	1880–1956	painter, illustrator	honorary member	1948
Barbu Știrbei	1872–1946	politician	honorary member	1929
Stanciu Stoian	1900–1984	educator	corresponding member	1963
Peter Stoica	1949 -	engineer	honorary member	1999
Constantin C. Stoicescu	1881–1944	jurist	corresponding member	1936
Nicolae Stoicescu	1924–1999	historian	honorary member	1993
Simion Stoilow	1887–1961	mathematician	titular member	1945
Ioan Strajescu	1833–1873	politician	founding member	1866
Gavril Ștrempel	1926-2020	cultural historian	honorary member	1993
Vasile Stroescu	1845–1926	politician	honorary member	1910
Șerban Sturdza	1947 -	architect	corresponding member	2010
Dimitrie A. Sturdza-Miclausanu	1833–1914	historian, politician	titular member	1871
Dimitrie C. Sturdza-Scheianu	1839–1920	historian, politician	honorary member	1907
Marius Sturza	1876–1954	physician	honorary member	1938
Gheorghe Claudiu Suciu	1905–1990	chemist	titular member	1990
Vasile Suciu	1873–1935	metropolitan	honorary member	1919
Alexandru Surdu	1938 -2020	philosopher	titular member	1993
Ion C. Suruceanu	1851–1897	historian	honorary member	1888
Alexandru A. Suțu	1837–1919	physician	corresponding member	1888
Mihail C. Suțu	1841–1933	historian	titular member	1909
Iosif Szabo	1803 - 1874	botanist, pharmacist	honorary member	1872
Orest Tafrali	1876–1937	historian	corresponding member	1936
Cătălin Tănase	1962 -	mycologist, botanist	corresponding member	2018
Florin-Teodor Tănăsescu	1932-	engineer	honorary member	2021
Ion Tănăsescu	1892–1959	chemist	titular member	1955
Tudor A. Tănăsescu	1901–1961	engineer	corresponding member	1952
Ioan Tanoviceanu	1858–1917	jurist	corresponding member	1897
Cornel Țăranu	1934–2023	composer	corresponding member	2012
Gheorghe Tașcă	1875–1964	economist	corresponding member	1926
Gheorghe Tătărescu	1886–1957	politician	honorary member	1937
Grigore Tăușan	1874–1952	philosopher	honorary member	1939
Nicolae Teclu	1839–1916	chemist	titular member	1879
Gheorghe Tecuci	1954 -	engineer	titular member	1993
Pompiliu Teodor	1930–2001	historian	corresponding member	1990
Nicolae Teodoreanu	1889–1977	veterinary	corresponding member	1952
Anibal Teodorescu	1881–1971	jurist	corresponding member	1945
Emanoil C. Teodorescu	1866–1949	botanist	titular member	1945
Horia-Nicolai Teodorescu	1951 -	engineer	corresponding member	1993
Nicolae-Victor Teodorescu	1908–2000	mathematician	titular member	1963
Paul Teodorescu	1888–1981	general	corresponding member	1938
Virgil Teodorescu	1909–1987	writer	corresponding member	1974
Gabriel Țepelea	1916–2012	literary historian, writer, politician	honorary member	1993
Friedrich Teutsch	1852–1933	bishop, historian	honorary member	1919
Basil Theodorescu	1891–1967	physician	titular member	1965
Răzvan Theodorescu	1939 -2023	cultural historian, art historian	titular member	2000
Alexandru Timotin	1925–2007	engineer	titular member	1999
Nicolae Tipei	1913–1999	engineer	corresponding member	1963
Gheorghe Țițeica	1873–1939	mathematician	titular member	1913
Serban Țițeica	1908–1986	physicist	titular member	1955
Nicolae Titulescu	1882–1941	diplomat, politician	titular member	1935
Grigore Tocilescu	1850–1909	historian, archeologist, epigraphist, folklorist	titular member	1890
Alexandru Todea	1912–2002	cardinal	honorary member	1992
Sigismund Toduță	1908–1991	composer, musicologist	corresponding member	1991
Alexandru Toma	1875–1954	writer	titular member	1948
Constantin I. Toma	1935 -	botanist-morphologist	corresponding member	2012
Victor Toma	1922–2008	engineer	honorary member	1993
Ioan Tomescu	1942 -	mathematician	corresponding member	2000
Vasile Tonoiu	1941 -	philosopher	titular member	2003
Vladimir Țopa	1929–2006	physicist	corresponding member	1993
George Topîrceanu	1886–1937	writer	corresponding member	1936
Ilie E. Torouțiu	1888–1953	critic, literary historian, folklorist, translator	corresponding member	1936
Vladimir Trebici	1916–1999	demographer, sociologist	titular member	1992
Radu Z. Tudose	1928–2008	chemical engineer	corresponding member	1991
Victor Tufescu	1908–2000	geographer	titular member	1992
Dan Tufiș	1954 -	engineer	titular member	2011
Andrei Țugulea	1928-2017	engineer	titular member	1999
Ion Țurai	1907–1970	physician	corresponding member	1955
Alexandru Tzigara-Samurcas	1872–1952	art historian	corresponding member	1938
George N. Udrischi	1867–1958	veterinary	honorary member	1946
Gheorghe Udubașa	1938 -	geologist	corresponding member	1996
Alexandru Ungureanu	1941 -	geographer	corresponding member	1995
Vasile Urechia-Alexandrescu	1834–1901	historian, writer, politician	founding member	1867
Ioan Ursu	1928–2007	physicist	titular member	1974
Ioan Ursu	1875–1925	historian	titular member	1910
Neculai Alexandru Ursu	1926 – 2016	philologist	corresponding member	2013
Iulian Văcărel	1928-2019	economist	titular member	1994
Victor Vâlcovici	1885–1970	mathematician	titular member	1965
George Vâlsan	1885–1935	geographer	titular member	1920
Augustin Vancea	1892–1973	geologist	corresponding member	1963
Petre Vancea	1902–1986	physician	corresponding member	1963
Ștefan Vârgolici	1843–1897	literary critic, translator, publicist	corresponding member	1887
Pavel Vasici-Ungureanu	1806–1881	physician, writer	titular member	1879
Nicolae Vasilescu-Karpen	1870–1964	engineer	titular member	1923
Amilcar P. Vasiliu	1900–1994	engineer agronomist	titular member	1963
Emanuel Vasiliu	1929–2001	linguist	titular member	1992
Haralambie Vasiliu	1880–1953	agrichemist	posthumous member	1990
Dumitru Vatamaniuc	1920 -2018	critic, literary historian	honorary member	2001
Virgil I. Vătășianu	1902–1993	art historian	titular member	1974
Ladislau Vekas	1945 -	physicist	corresponding member	2012
Vasile N. Velican	1904–1984	engineer, agronomist	corresponding member	1963
Stefan Vencov	1899–1955	physicist	corresponding member	1948
Tudor Vianu	1897–1964	esthetician, historian, literary critic, essayist, writer	titular member	1955
Gheza Vida	1913–1980	sculptor	corresponding member	1974
Grigore Vieru	1935–2009	writer	corresponding member	1993
Marius Petre Visarion	1929–2006	engineer geophysicist	corresponding member	1991
Alexandru M. Vitzu	1852–1902	zoologist	corresponding member	1897
Ionel Valentin Vlad	1943–2017	engineer, physicist	titular member	2009
Radu I. Vlădescu	1886–1963	veterinary, biochemist	titular member	1955
Gheorghe Vlăduțescu	1937 -	philosopher	titular member	1999
Alexandru Vlahuță	1858–1919	writer	posthumous member	1948
Aurel Vlaicu	1882–1913	engineer, pilot	posthumous member	1948
Mihail Voicu	1943 -	engineer	corresponding member	2006
Victor A. Voicu	1939 -	general physician, farmacolog	titular member	2001
Marin Gh. Voiculescu	1913–1991	physician	titular member	1990
Vasile Voiculescu	1884–1963	physician, writer	posthumous member	1993
Vlad Voiculescu	1913–2001	physician	titular member	1991
Radu P. Voinea	1923–2010	engineer	titular member	1974
Dimitrie Voinov	1867–1951	zoologist, histolog, citolog	titular member	1927
Stefan Voitec	1900–1984	politician	titular member	1980
Nestor Vornicescu	1927–2000	metropolitan	honorary member	1992
Gheorghe Vrânceanu	1900–1979	mathematician	titular member	1955
Alexandru Viorel Vrânceanu	1927 -2014	sylvicultor	honorary member	2011
Traian Vuia	1872–1950	engineer, inventor	honorary member	1946
Iosif Vulcan	1841–1907	publicist, animator cultural, writer	titular member	1891
Romulus Vulcănescu	1912–1999	etnolog, writer	honorary member	1993
Alexandru Vulpe	1931 – 2016	historian, archeologist	titular member	2009
Alexandru D. Xenopol	1847–1920	historian, economist, sociologist	titular member	1893
Mircea Zaciu	1928–2000	critic, literary historian	honorary member	1997
Barbu Zaharescu	1906–2000	economist	corresponding member	1955
Maria Zaharescu	1938 -	chemist	titular member	2015
Gheorghe Zaman	1942 -2021	economist	corresponding member	2001
Krikor H. Zambaccian	1889–1962	critic, art collector	corresponding member	1948
Catalin Zamfir	1941 -	sociologist	corresponding member	1991
Nicolae Victor Zamfir	1952 -	physicist	corresponding member	2006
Duiliu Zamfirescu	1858–1922	writer	titular member	1908
Tudor Zamfirescu	1944 -	mathematician	honorary member	2010
Gheorghe Zane	1897–1978	economist, historian	titular member	1974
George Zarnea	1920–2012	physician, biologist	titular member	1994
Sever I. Zotta	1874–1943	historian	corresponding member	1919
Alexandru Zub	1934 -	historian	titular member	2004
Dorel Zugrăvescu	1930–2019	engineer geophysicist	corresponding member	1991
Ioan Zugrăvescu	1910–1989	chemist	corresponding member	1963
Aurel Iancu	1928–	economist	titular member	1993
