= Marius Nasta =

Romanian physician and scientist

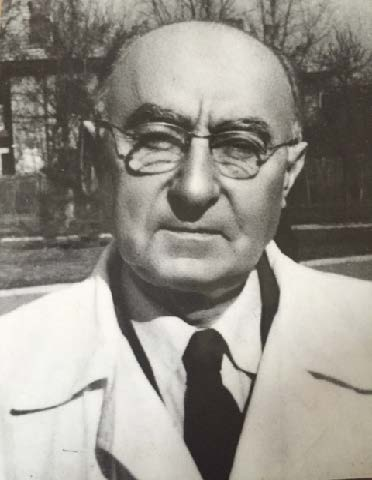
- Born: 4 December 1890; Bucharest, Kingdom of Romania
- Died: 6 April 1965 (aged 74); Bucharest, Romanian People's Republic
- Education: Institute of Medicine and Pharmacy of Bucharest; Pasteur Institute
- Awards: Order of the Crown of Romania; Medal for Manhood and Faith; Health Merit Cross; Legion of Honour; Médaille d’Honneur et des Épidémies
- Scientific career
- Fields: Physician, professor of medicine, member of the Romanian Academy
- Workplaces: Carol Davila University of Medicine and Pharmacy

Marius Nasta (4 December 1890 – 6 April 1965) was a Romanian physician and scientist renowned for his work in the field of tuberculosis. He was a titular member of the Romanian Academy and President of the Union of Societies of Medical Sciences.

He reduced mortality from tuberculosis in Romania and played a leading role in the development of a national strategy involving the research, prophylaxis and treatment of tuberculosis, as well as the establishment of a network of sanatoria and clinics for the treatment of pulmonary diseases in Romania. Nasta laid the foundations for the teaching of modern epidemiology of tuberculosis, set up the first Chair of Phthisiology at the Bucharest Faculty of Medicine and fostered research in the field of bacteriology. Romania's Stalinist rulers put him in charge of a leading hospital and research center in the field of respiratory medicine called Institutul de Ftiziologie. In 1959, they "exposed" Marius Nasta for his "cosmopolitan behavior". After the fall of communism in Romania in 1989, the institute was renamed Institutul de Pneumoftiziologie Marius Nasta in his honour. He is regarded as "one of the fathers of the care, treatment, and study of tuberculosis of the lung in Romania".

== Early life and education ==
Marius Nasta was born in Bucharest in 1890. He was the third of four children born to Alexandru and Irene Nasta. Alexandru Nasta, a bank clerk turned factory manager, had Aromanians origins.

Alexandru's wife Irene (born Constantinidis), descended from a Greek family which counted linguists, writers and diplomats among its members. The early death of Alexandru Nasta in 1898, caused the family to fall on hard times and forced Irene to teach piano lessons in order to support and raise her four children. His mother's hardship, left a powerful impression on the young Marius whose hard work and modesty were to become hallmarks of his life. After attending primary school in Bucharest between 1896 and 1900, Nasta entered Gheorghe Lazăr High School, then one of the Romanian capital's leading secondary schools, from where he graduated in 1908. That same year, he enrolled as a medical student at the Faculty of Medicine of the University of Bucharest.

== Ioan Cantacuzino and the "Cantacuzino School" ==
At the Bucharest Faculty of Medicine, Nasta was taught by Ioan Cantacuzino who took him under his wing and who had a major influence on his early professional career and personal life. An outgoing and complex personality, Cantacuzino combined outstanding teaching with a passion for rigorous scientific research, a vast clinical experience, and wider interests which included music and the etchings of baroque French printmakers. Inspired by Élie Metchnikoff (on whose staff he had served for several years at the Pasteur Institute), Cantacuzino's courses explored new areas of experimental medicine and offered his students the opportunity to carry out cutting edge fundamental scientific research in a laboratory that he set up in 1901 within the confines of the Bucharest-based Institute of Pathology and Bacteriology. As early as 1904, Cantacuzino's laboratory engaged in the production of the anti-streptococcal serum followed, in 1906, by the production of the Anti-Dysentery (Shiga) serum as well as the production of other vaccines to combat diseases such as cholera and typhus.

By integrating Cantacuzino's team, Nasta joined a group whose members left an indelebile mark on the Romanian scientific and medical world. Also known as "Cantacuzino School" or "Cantacuziniști", early members of the school included Alexandru Slătineanu (Cantacuzino's deputy), Ștefan Irimescu (regarded as the founder of Romanian pneumo-phthisiology and a member of the Romanian Academy) and Mihai Ciucă (a leading bacteriologist of his time and member of the Romanian Academy and of the Royal Society). They were followed by other distinguished personalities such as Constantin Ionescu-Mihăești (a leading bacteriologist and immunologist, a member of the Romanian Academy), Alexandru Ciucă (a veterinary physician, member of the Romanian Academy), Daniel Danielopolu (a leading physiologist, clinician and pharmacologist, member of the Romanian Academy), Dumitru Combiescu, Gheorghe Zotta, Ion Bălteanu, Ion Nicolau, and Nicolae Gh. Lupu.

== Early career ==
During his medical studies, Nasta worked as a medical extern at the Eforia Spitalelor Civile between 1911 and 1913 and as a medical intern at the "Brâncoveanu" hospital in Bucharest between 1913 and 1918. His internship was interrupted by the Second Balkan War and by World War I (see Military service section). After graduating from the Faculty of Medicine with top marks in 1918, Nasta worked and studied at the Pasteur Institute between 1918 and 1920. His work in France earned him several French medals including the Legion of Honour (see Orders and Medals section) and on his return in 1921, he took up the position of assistant researcher at the Institute for Serum and Vaccines, renamed that year Cantacuzino Institute. The latter was now state funded and its work was considered critical for the Romanian health service. It combined scientific research in fields such as microbiology, experimental pathology, epidemiology and hygiene with the production of vaccines to protect against a number of human diseases such as intestinal infections, polio, diphtheria, tetanus, typhus, and malaria. In 1926, Marius Nasta was appointed head of the newly created tuberculosis section at the Cantacuzino Institute. That same year, he spent several months in Paris, working at the Laennec Hospital and in the laboratory of Albert Calmette. In 1927, a grant from the Rockefeller Foundation enabled him to travel to the United States where he visited and worked in several treatment centers including at the Saranac Lake center for the treatment of pulmonary tuberculosis. Between 1928 and 1934, Nasta continued his scientific research at the Cantacuzino Institute and practiced as a physician specialised in pulmonary diseases at the Casa Asigurărilor Sociale.

== Later career ==
After Cantacuzino's death in 1934, Nasta left the Cantacuzino Institute to head a department specialising in the treatment of various forms of tuberculosis and in the surgery of other heavy pulmonary diseases at Pantelimon Hospital in Bucharest. Alongside his clinical practice at Pantelimon Hospital, Nasta worked assiduously on behalf of the "League for the combat against tuberculosis" (see 1920–1939 section), taught at the Faculty of Medicine (see Academic career section), and carried out outpatient consultations at Filaret Hospital and in his own private practice. In 1944, he moved from Pantelimon Hospital to Filaret Hospital where he taught and practiced as head of clinic until 1949. That year, he founded the "Institutul de Ftiziologie" and served as its director until his forced retirement in 1959.

== Academic career ==
Nasta's academic career started in 1927 when he was appointed assistant lecturer to Ioan Cantacuzino at the Chair of Experimental Medicine of the University of Bucharest's Faculty of Medicine. Promoted to lecturer in 1930, he set up the chair of phthisiology at the Faculty of Medicine in 1943, when he became an associate professor. He was appointed a full professor in 1946.

Nasta lectured both in and outside Romania. He was a regular speaker at various TB conferences organised by the Union against Tuberculosis and Lung Disease in Western and Eastern Europe (France, Italy, Switzerland, Hungary, Poland, and Czechoslovakia), the Soviet Union, and India. In the 1950s, he spent several months lecturing at various universities in China at the invitation of the Chinese Academy of Sciences.

== Research ==
Nasta's research, carried out either by himself or in teams, covered the most important fields of phthisiology such as bacteriology, immunology and the physiophathology of respiratory diseases. In the field of tuberculosis, his research focused on the immunology of the disease, mycobacterium tuberculosis, vaccines (Bacillus Calmette Guerin vaccine or BCG) as well as on the detection, chemotherapy, pathology of pulmonary and extra-pulmonary tuberculosis. Nasta's research on experimental chemoprophylaxis and immuno-prophylaxis of tuberculosis was cutting edge. It enabled the introduction of specific and practical methods for the prevention of the disease throughout Romania. He also studied tuberculosis and bronchopathy in specific living and working environments and established a link between such environments and the proliferation of these diseases.

== Role in campaigns against tuberculosis ==
=== 1920–1939 ===
Until the late 1920s, the campaign to combat tuberculosis in Romania was carried out mainly through non governmental organisations such as the "Society for the prophylaxis of tuberculosis and the aid of poor tuberculosis patients" and the "Society for the combat of tuberculosis in children" which relied on private financial contributions to provide care. In 1926, Ioan Cantacuzino appointed Marius Nasta as the head of a new section within the Cantacuzino Institute in charge of developing anti-tuberculosis vaccines (see Early career section). That same year, working in close partnership with Albert Calmette's laboratory in Paris, the Cantacuzino team was responsible for the introduction of the BCG vaccine in Romania. As a result of that significant development and within a few years, Romania had the second highest number of vaccinated children in Europe (170,000 in 1930, second only to France with 600,000 vaccinated children). Nasta became a champion for compulsory BCG vaccination of children in Romania. In 1930, Professor Cantacuzino appointed him as the Secretary General of the Society for the Study of Tuberculosis. The latter organised the first national conferences on the subject of tuberculosis and published the "Bulletin of the Society for the Study of Tuberculosis" between 1930 and 1948.

At the Society for the Study of Tuberculosis conferences in 1931 and 1933, Cantacuzino pleaded for the establishment of a "League for the combat against tuberculosis" (the "League") which would pool all the main existing structures (both governmental and non-governmental ) through which tuberculosis was being treated. In 1934, the year of Ioan Cantacuzino's death, the League was established by law and received significant funding from the Romanian state as well as from the private sector. Its patron was Romania's King Carol II. Together with Ion Costinescu (President of the League) and Ṣtefan Irimescu (Secretary of the League), Nasta played an important role in the activities of the League. The latter was responsible for building state of the art sanatoria and dispensaries throughout the country (at Balotesti, Moroeni, Dobriṭa, Marila, Vorniceni, Valea Iasului, Alexandria and the Regina Elisabeta dispensary in Bucharest), for launching major tuberculosis awareness programs (through advertising campaigns, lecture programs and radio broadcasts), and for championing the introduction of special medical insurance cover against tuberculosis. A further contribution of the League consisted in an expansion of existing prophylactic and treatment techniques to combat tuberculosis and other pulmonary diseases (e.g. mass civilian screenings with mobile X ray machines were conducted among young pupils in schools throughout Bucharest) as well as the establishment of a tuberculosis focused education and training center within the Filaret Hospital. As a direct result of the League's work, hospital beds dedicated to the treatment of tuberculosis in Romania increased from 1925 to 6743 between 1934 and 1939.

=== 1946–1959 ===
In the aftermath of World War II, the League was renamed the "Direction of Tuberculosis" ("DT") and became a department of the Ministry of Health under the newly installed communist regime. The DT's task was to bring TB under control. With the support of the Ministry of Health, Nasta set up the Institutul de Ftiziologie (the "IF") in 1949. The IF operated alongside the Filaret Hospital and had a branch in Cluj (headed by Leon Daniello) and one in Iasi (headed by Nicolae Bumbacescu). It included several departments and sections: research department, clinical unit for patient care, teaching department for post-graduate medical students and a section dedicated to the launch of TB awareness campaigns and to the liaison with other medical units throughout the country.

In 1950, the IF launched the "National Program for the Control of TB" (the "Program"). The implementation of the Program during that decade resulted in a significant increase in the number of trained pulmonary surgeons from 70 (in the 1940s) to over 1300 (by 1960) as well as in an increase in the number of TB clinics in the country (these increased fivefold). Radiography services to detect TB were also introduced in clinics and hospitals throughout the country. By the end of the 1950s and in less than ten years, mortality due to tuberculosis went down from 180 to 35 per 100,000 inhabitants and the incidence of the disease went down from over 800 to 330 per 100,000 inhabitants.

In recognition for his contributions to medicine, Marius Nasta was elected President of the Union of the Societies of Medical Sciences in 1950. In 1953, Nasta was elected a corresponding member of the Romanian Academy. He became a titular member in 1955.

== Personal life ==
Nasta married Lucia "Loulou" Băicoianu in 1922. Lucia's father was Constantin Băicoianu, a leading Romanian economist and banker and her maternal grandfather was Petre Aurelian, a former Romanian Prime Minister who also served as a minister in several governments after the country's independence in 1877. The marriage produced four children including Mihai Nasta, the distinguished classical philologist. Nasta formed lifelong friendships with other members of the "Cantacuzino School" (see Ioan Cantacuzino and the "Cantacuzino School" section). Some, like him, were full-time residents at the Cantacuzino Institute and raised families within its confines. Nasta's life was further enriched by artists and writers who socialised with members of the Cantacuzino School. He and his wife Lucia, counted among their friends the painters Jean Steriadi, Theodor Pallady, and Dumitru Ghiață, the sculptors Milița Petrașcu and Ion Jalea, the musician Vasile Jianu, the philosopher Dimitrie Cuclin, and the literary critic Alice Voinescu. The writer Panait Istrati, who has TB, became a friend of the Nasta family after receiving much needed medical assistance from Marius at the Filaret hospital in the final years of his life. In 1913, Nasta befriended Vladimir Ghika, then a volunteer streatcher-bearer in the Zimnicea pest house (see Military service section). Ghika's faith (he converted from orthodoxy to Catholicism and, after his death in a communist prison, was declared a martyr of the Catholic Church and beatified by Pope Francis) had a profound impact on the Nasta family and led to Lucia Nasta's conversion to Catholicism. Many of these friends and their close families perished in communist prisons or were, like the Nastas, subjected to various forms of persecution by the new regime.

On a spiritual level, Nasta developed a set of beliefs based on his lifelong experiences treating patients and on the inspiration that he drew from the writings of two of his favorite authors: Michel de Montaigne and Sir Thomas Browne. Faith, hope and charity, as described in Browne's Religio Medici, defined Nasta's attitude towards his patients. Michel de Montaigne's goal, as stated in his "Essays", of describing himself with utter frankness and honesty ("bonne foi") guided Nasta in his continuous quest for self-improvement and in his desire for living "with a purpose".

== Military service ==
Nasta served in the Second Balkan War (1913), in World War I (1916) and its immediate aftermath (1919), as well as in World War II (1944).

At the end of the Second Balkan War during the summer of 1913, hundreds of Romanian combatants died due to a sudden outbreak of cholera. Victor Babeș (the Romanian physician, academician and professor, considered as one of the founders of microbiology) and Ioan Cantacuzino were tasked by the Romanian Government with taking immediate measures to stop the cholera epidemic from spreading to the rest of the Romanian armed forces and to the civilian population. Cantacuzino and his deputies (Constantin Ionescu-Mihăesti, Mihai Ciucă, and Alexandru Slătineanu) were instrumental in setting up several mobile hospitals and pest houses which were used to treat patients and vaccinate the entire IVth Romanian army corps. Nasta served as a first sergeant physician in the pest house at Zimnicea. Known as the "Zimnicea team", Nasta and his young colleagues saved countless lives and earned several military medals for their service and bravery (see "Personal life" and "Orders and Medals").

In 1916, during World War I, Cantacuzino's laboratory was converted into the Institute of Serums and Vaccines of the Romanian Army. Its staff, including Nasta, was responsible for the production of cholera, typhus, and TB vaccines distributed to the Romanian, Russian, and Allied Mission in the Balkans.

In the immediate aftermath of World War I during 1919, Cantacuzino (now the head of the Romanian Red Cross) was asked by the French government to rescue members of the Romanian Legion of Italy who were placed at the Casale di Altamura camp in Puglia, Italy. An outbreak of cholera struck the camp and killed over 600 of its members. Cantacuzino, then head of the Romanian Red Cross, dispatched a team led by Nasta who arrived at the camp in May 1919. Their intervention achieved its purpose and, as in 1913, earned Nasta several medals (see "Orders and Medals"). While at the camp, Nasta was joined by Camillo Artom who had been sent by the Italian authorities to help with treating those suffering from cholera. Artom was to become one of the leading microbiologists of his generation. Nasta and Artom carried out important research while at the camp relating in particular to the aetiology and pathogenesis of exanthematic typhus. Nasta's findings were published that same year in an article co-authored with Cantacuzino, Bulla and Ionescu-Mihaiesti.

During World War II, between 1941 and 1944, Nasta was enrolled as a Major in the Romanian Army Medical Corps. In 1944, he led the Romanian capital's first aid teams during the aerial bombardments by the Nazis and the Allied Forces.

== Persecution by the communist regime and death ==
Given the success of the "National Program for the Control of TB", the communist regime was keen to showcase its results outside Romania. Nasta was permitted to travel on lecture tours outside Romania (see Academic career section). He was convinced of the importance of microbial genetics in his field and increasingly critical of some of the influential Romanian scientists who favored Trofim Lysenko's pseudo scientific ideas. He was also appalled by the abuses perpetrated by the regime on geneticists who were followers of Mendelian genetics. Nasta favored the introduction of new methods for the detection of TB based on chemo-prophylaxis, and became increasingly concerned about the excessive use of outdated X ray machines which had damaging side effects on patients. This brought him in direct conflict with Voinea Marinescu, the communist Minister of Health, who viewed such concerns as criticisms. Although supported by the communist regime in his professional endeavors, Nasta was regarded with suspicion as he remained politically unaffiliated (unlike some of his distinguished peers, he refused to join the ranks of the Romanian Communist Party) and was married to someone whom the communists regarded as a former member of the "landowning class".

By the end of the 1950s, Romania's Stalinist rulers felt increasingly threatened by the changes in leadership in the Soviet Union and by possible internal unrest following the Hungarian Revolution of 1956. A new terror wave followed in Romania and included reprisals aimed at those who were suspected of criticism against the regime. In this context, Nasta's scientific views, his personal profile, his circle of friends (see Personal life section) and his frequent travels on scientific missions outside Romania were used against him by the communists. In 1958, the Romanian Department of State Security (the "Securitate") opened a secret investigation on Nasta who was suspected of being an agent of the British Secret Intelligence Service recruited in Switzerland during a lecture tour earlier that year. Close surveillance of both him and his immediate family for several years found no evidence to support the Securitate's suspicion. In April 1959, Nasta and his wife were publicly shamed and "exposed" during one of the leading show trials of the decade. The accusations leveled against them consisted in "making disparaging comments against the popular-democratic regime and against socialism, listening to imperialist radio stations, and spreading rumors and insults against the foreign policy of the Soviet Union". The "sentence" applied following the "trial", consisted in him being stripped of all his teaching and managerial positions. Deeply affected by the persecutions both him and his family were subjected to, Nasta developed terminal cancer in 1963 and died in Bucharest in April 1965.

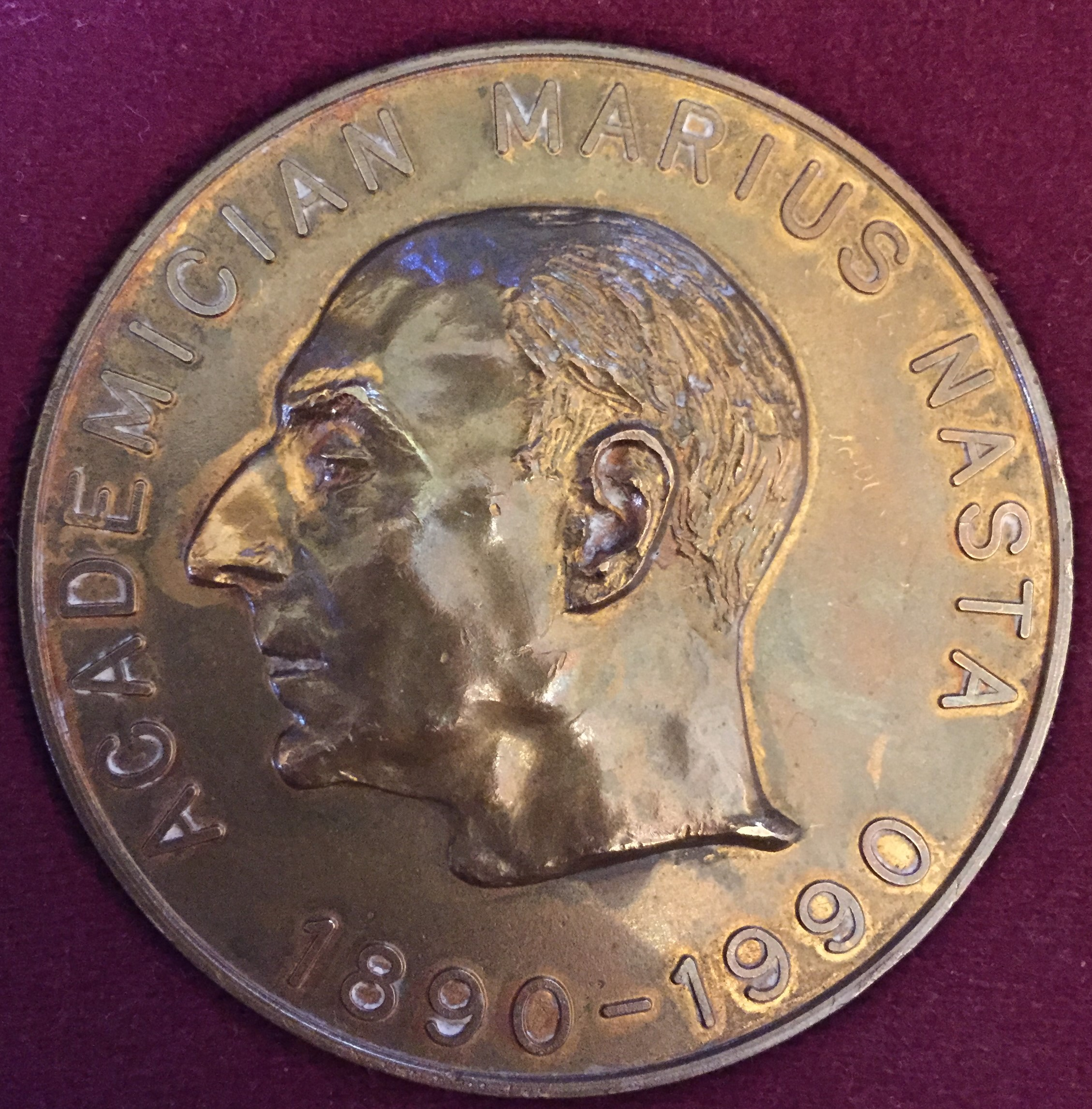
Commemorative Medal issued in 1990, on the centenary of the birth of Marius Nasta

== Rehabilitation and legacy ==
At the time of Nasta's death in 1965, Romania boasted a school of phthisiology of international renown. At its centre was the Institute of Phthisiology (the "Institute"). Thousands of doctors taught and trained by Nasta and his team over several decades, now worked in hospitals and clinics throughout Romania in cities such as Cluj, Iași, Târgu Mureș, and Timișoara, where over 30,000 beds (compared to only 3,500 in 1945) were reserved for patients with pulmonary and extra-pulmonary TB.

One of Marius Nasta's other major contributions was the establishment in 1951 of the "Phthisiology Section" of the Society for Medical Sciences. The Phthisiology Section evolved into the "Society of Phthisiology" part of the "Union of the Society of Medical Sciences" (today's "Romanian Medical Association"). The Society of Phthisiology continued to pursue the aims of the Society for the Study of Tuberculosis set up by Professor Cantacuzino in the 1930s: raising the standards of clinicians and researchers alike, the development of prophylaxis to combat TB and all other pulmonary diseases, publication of an authoritative journal in the field.

The fall of communism in Romania in 1989 enabled the Romanian scientific and medical community to acknowledge Marius Nasta as "the founder of modern Romanian phthisiology". The centenary of his birth in 1990 was marked in Bucharest by the renaming of the "Institute of Phthisiology" as the "Marius Nasta Institute of Pneumophthisiology". The Institute remains to this day a leading hospital, teaching and research centre in the field of pulmonary diseases, which includes the Pneumology Clinic of the Carol Davila University of Medicine and Pharmacy. Current and former staff of the Institute include Constantin Anastasatu (a physician, member of the Romanian Academy and former head of the "Marius Nasta Institute"), Cornel Cărpinișan (a thoracic surgeon considered the founder of Romanian thoracic surgery), Al. Bulla, I.P. Stoicescu, Miron Bogdan (a physician and member of the Romanian Academcy of Medical Sciences), Florin Mihălțan, Ștefan Rujinski, and Claudia Toma to name but a few.

The Society of Phthisiology set up by Nasta is now called the "Romanian Society of Pneumology" ("RSP"). It includes over half of Romania's pneumologists and works closely with international bodies such as the European Respiratory Society. The RSP's journal continues to be published to this day under the name "Pneumologia".

== Main publications ==
Nasta's research was published both in and outside Romania in over 300 scientific articles which he wrote or co-wrote with his collaborators.

He authored several courses on phthisiology which he taught at the Faculty of Medicine. He wrote several biographical studies as well as several studies setting out an overview of the state of research of TB at particular points in time. Nasta also directed several academic journals such as the "Bulletin of the Society for the Study of Tuberculosis" and the "Journal of the Romanian Society of Pneumology".

=== Monographic studies ===
- "The Chemotherapy of Tuberculosis"
- "Treaty on Tuberculosis" (vol. 1 and 2)
- "Bronchopulmonary tumours"
- "Morphopathology of tuberculosis"

=== Biographical studies ===
- "Robert Koch and the tuberculosis bacillus"
- "René Laennec"
- "Victor Babeș"

=== Academic courses ===
- "Phthisiology Course"
- "Phthisiology Manual"

=== Other works ===
- "TB in the industrial environment"
- "TB in the rural environment"
- "The combat against TB in Romania"

== Orders and medals ==
For his actions both in and outside the theaters of war, Nasta received numerous medals and awards. Set out below is a list of the most important ones:

- Ordinul Coroana României (Order of the Crown); Romania
- Medalia pentru bărbăție și credință (Medal for Manhood and Faith); Romania
- Ordinul Virtutea Militară (Order of Military Virtue); Romania
- Crucea "Meritul Sanitar" (Health Merit Cross); Romania
- Légion d'honneur; France
- Médaille d'honneur des épidémies (Medal of Honour of the Outbreaks); France
- Medalia Om de Știință Emerit (Distinguished scientist medal); Romania
- Ordinul Muncii (Order of Work); Romania
- Premiul de Stat (Prize of the Romanian State); Romania
