= Ștefan Nicolau =

Ștefan Nicolau may refer to:

- Ștefan Gh. Nicolau (1874–1970), Romanian physician
- Ștefan S. Nicolau (1896–1967), Romanian physician
