= Dan Giușcă =

Romanian geologist

- Born: 14 July 1904
- Died: 10 August 1988 (aged 84)
- Citizenship: Romanian
- Education: University of Bucharest, University of Cluj, ETH Zurich
- Scientific career
- Fields: geology, petrology
- Workplaces: Cluj-Napoca, Bucharest
- Thesis: (1927)

Dan Giușcă (14 July 1904 – 10 August 1988) was a Romanian geologist and a member of the Romanian Academy.

== Biography ==
In 1927, Giușcă received his PhD in chemistry from the University of Cluj, having his theses on the morphotropic effect of closing of spiranic cycles. After finishing his degree, he was hired by Ludovic Mrazec at the Geologic Institute and at the University of Bucharest's Department of Mineralogy. In 1929, Giușcă obtained a scholarship at the Swiss Federal Institute of Technology in Zurich, after which he worked in Germany at the laboratories of Paul Niggli and Wilhelm Eitel.

After returning to Romania in 1931, he taught at the University of Bucharest and conducted research at the Geologic Institute. At the age of 33, he became a lecturer (conferențiar) and at the age of 44, he became a professor. Dan Giușcă was elected a corresponding member of the Romanian Academy in 1963 and a titular member in 1974. Throughout his career he published over 130 scientific articles and books.

== Work ==
After returning to Bucharest, Giușcă began studying at the Institute of Geology magmatic and metamorphic rocks. He studied the chemical structure of Nagyágite, contact metamorphism at Băița Bihorului and discovered a new of deposit zeolites. In the Hinghiș Mountains, he studied granitic rocks, while in the Vlădeasa Massif he studied volcanic phenomena and the associated hydrothermal metamorphism. Giușcă studied the granitic rocks of the Pricopan Ridge in Northern Dobruja, arguing for a magmatic origin of the epidote.

During the 1950s, Giușcă began studying a new field: neogene volcanism and old metamorphism in the Carpathians. His studies included the neogene vulcanites of the Gutâi Mountains. He continued studying mesozoic magmatism through the study of banatites and ophiolites in the Apuseni Mountains.
