= Străjescu =

Străjescu is a family and place name in Romania and Moldova.

- Ioan Străjescu (1833–1873), Romanian politician and founding member of the Romanian Academy
- Mihai Străjescu, an MP elected in the 1990 Moldavian Supreme Soviet election
- Străjescu, a village in Garoafa Commune, Vrancea County, Romania
