= Ioan Ciurea =

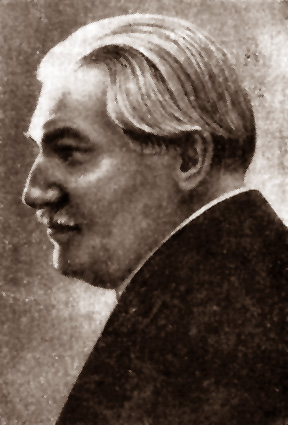

Ioan Ciurea (April 26 [O.S. April 13] 1878–March 20, 1944) was a Romanian veterinarian and parasitologist.

Born in Fălticeni, he graduated from Bucharest’s Higher School of Veterinary Medicine in 1902. He worked as a veterinarian for Căile Ferate Române in Craiova, then at the Piatra Neamț slaughterhouse from 1905. During this period, he discovered the cysticercus of Taenia saginata in veal. From 1910 to 1912, he pursued specialized studies at Berlin and Königsberg Universities. In 1919, he established the department of parasitology and food inspection at the veterinary medicine faculty of the University of Bucharest, becoming a full professor there in 1922. In June 1927, he was elected a corresponding member of the Romanian Academy. In 1929, he became a titular member of the Romanian Medical Academy, and in 1939 joined the German National Academy of Sciences Leopoldina. He entered the Helminthological Society of Washington in 1922.

Ciurea noted the presence of Trichinella spiralis in cats and of Physocephalus sexalatus in pigs, and found a new pig Echinostoma species. He described the lifecycle of a series of Trematoda and a number of new species from this class. He published studies in the Annals of Tropical Medicine & Parasitology of the Liverpool School of Tropical Medicine. He helped systematize parasite nomenclature internationally. He founded an ichthyology museum, collaborating with Grigore Antipa for nearly three decades. He died in Bucharest. A primary school in Fălticeni bears his name.
