= Constantin Ionescu =

Constantin Ionescu may refer to:

- Constantin Ionescu (politician), Romanian politician, mayor of Chişinău
- Constantin Ionescu (chess player) (1958–2024), Romanian chess player

== See also ==
- Constantin Ionescu-Mihăești, Romanian physician
