= Victor Mercea =

Romanian nuclear physicist

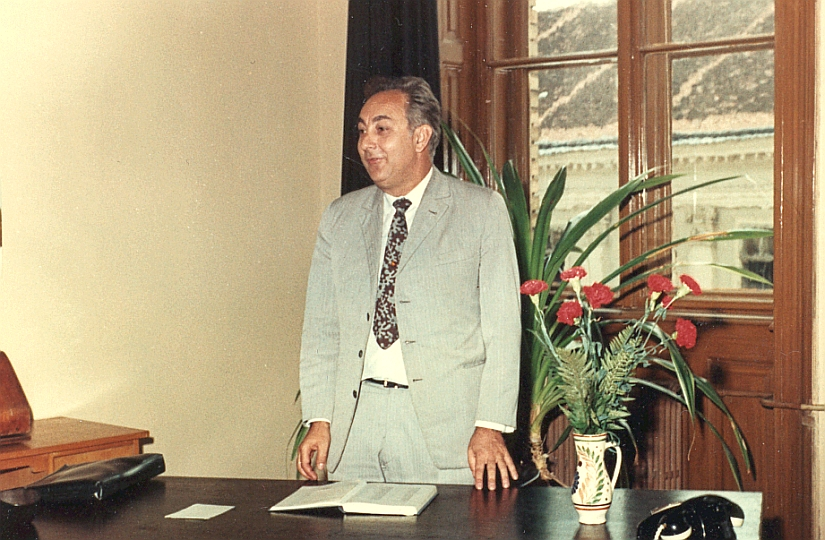
- Born: 2 January 1924
- Died: 29 June 1987 (aged 63)
- Occupation: Nuclear physicist

Victor Mercea (2 January 1924 – 29 June 1987) was a Romanian nuclear physicist. His most notable scientific contributions were in the production of heavy water. He authored more than 200 scientific publications. He served as the head of the Institute of Isotopic and Molecular Technologies (ITIM, Cluj-Napoca) from 1970 to 1987 and was a Professor of Solid-State Physics, Magnetism and Electronics at Babeș-Bolyai University. He also served as Dean of the Faculty of Physics from 1981 to 1984 and was a corresponding member of the Romanian Academy since1963.
