= Nicolae Simionescu =

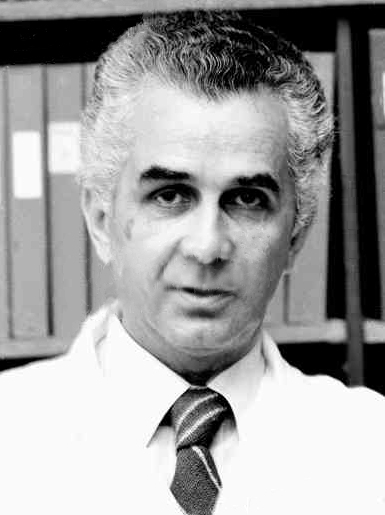
Nicolae Simionescu in 1980

Nicolae Simionescu (27 June 1926 – 6 February 1995) was a Romanian physician.

Born in Bucharest, he attended Dimitrie Cantemir and then Saint Andrew High School, graduating in 1944. He then enrolled in the medical faculty of the University of Bucharest, which he completed in 1950, earning his doctorate in 1966. From 1946 to 1970, he was on the staff of the same institution, rising from junior teaching assistant to teaching assistant to associate professor and department chairman. Meanwhile, he improved his skills as a surgeon until 1957, when he transferred to the Bucharest Endocrinology Institute. Working there until 1970, he conducted experimental and clinical research, functioning as head researcher in the morphology section. Relocating to the United States in 1970, he worked under George Emil Palade, first at The Rockefeller University (1970–73) and then at Yale University (1973–74).

While abroad and following his return, he focused on the cellular and molecular biopathology of the cardiovascular system, with a focus on endothelin and atherosclerosis. In 1979, he founded the Institute of Cellular Biology and Pathology, which bears his name since his death. His output includes over 600 articles, monographs, chapters and lectures delivered at international congresses. Two years after the revolution and fall of the communist regime, he became a titular member of the Romanian Academy in 1991, and died from an unknown cause in 1995.

His wife Maya Simionescu was a close scientific collaborator.
