= N. V. Zamfir =

Romanian nuclear physicist

Nicolae Victor Zamfir (born March 24, 1952) is a Romanian nuclear physicist.

== Early life and education ==
Zamfir was born in Orașul Stalin (Brașov), Romania, on March 24, 1952. He was educated at the University of Bucharest from 1971 to 1976. He received his Ph.D. in nuclear physics from the Central Institute of Physics in Bucharest.

== Awards and honors ==
Zamfir was awarded the Hurmuzescu Award of the Romanian Academy in 1984. He was elected to become a member of the academy in 2006.
