= Theodor Anton Neagu =

- Born: September 20, 1932; Giurgiu
- Died: March 5, 2017 (aged 84); Bucharest
- Known for: micropaleontology
- Scientific career
- Fields: paleontology

Theodor Anton Neagu (September 20, 1932 – March 5, 2017) was a Romanian micropaleontologist, stratigrapher, and, since 2001, titular member of the Romanian Academy. Neagu specialized in Upper Cretaceous foraminifera found in strata of the Carpathian Mountains.
