= Nicolae Docan =

Romanian civil servant and historian

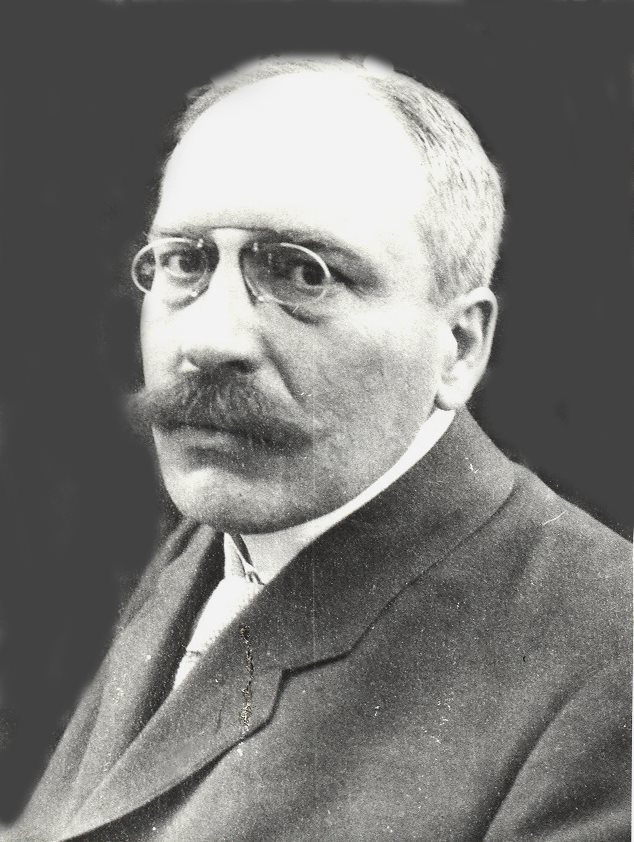
Nicolae Docan

Nicolae Docan (June 24, 1874–April 25, 1933) was a Romanian civil servant and historian.

Born in Bârlad, he attended secondary school in Galați, followed by the University of Paris, where he earned a degree in 1896. After several years as a magistrate and lawyer, he entered the Foreign Ministry. There, he gradually advanced through the ranks, attaining plenipotentiary status in 1918. He served as secretary general of the ministry from that September until June 1920. In November 1917, he joined the superior court of maritime prizes, remaining there until his death. For his work as a historian, Docan was elected a corresponding member of the Romanian Academy in 1915.
