= Pavel Vasici-Ungureanu =

Austro-Hungarian ethnic Romanian physician

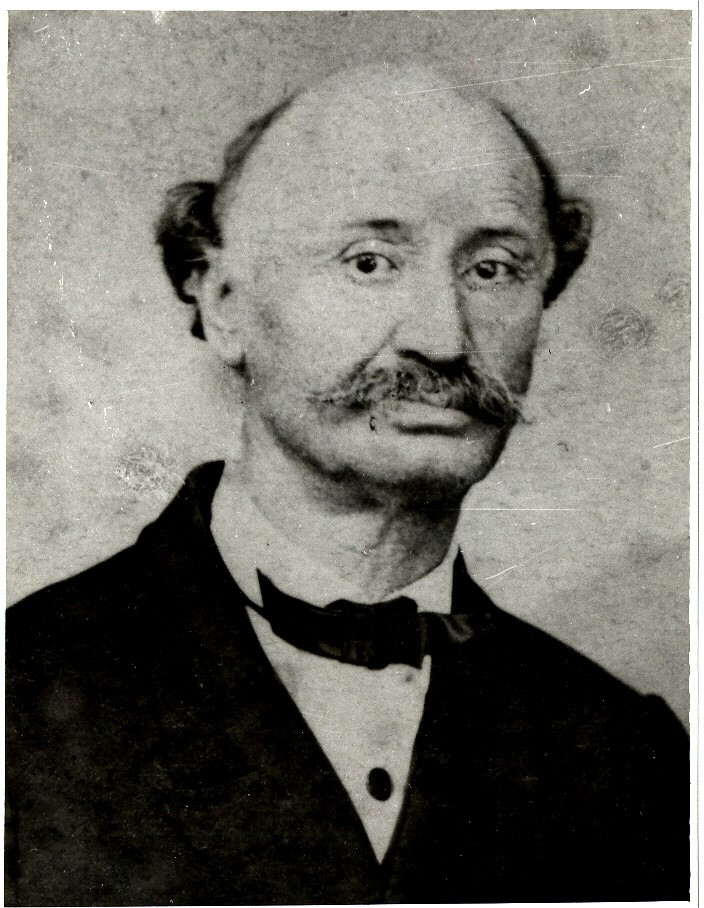
Pavel Vasici-Ungureanu

Pavel Vasici-Ungureanu (April 18, 1806–July 3, 1881) was an Austro-Hungarian ethnic Romanian medical doctor.

== Biography ==
=== Origins and education ===
He was born into a poor family in Timișoara, then part of the Austrian Empire. He was the second son of Vasile Ungureanu, a pandur from the Lower Alba area stationed in the Banat; and of Ana, who was of peasant origin. After completing the primary grades at the Romanian school in the Maiere district, he attended the city's gymnasium from 1819 to 1824 and proved a gifted student. After remaining an orphan, he received support from his older brother, who encouraged him to study philosophy at Szeged and Oradea. Attracted by medicine, he entered the University of Pest in 1827.

At the time, the Hungarian capital was home to a number of activist Romanian students who promoted revolutionary Enlightenment notions. In this atmosphere, Vasici absorbed the science and culture of the day and began to strive for the uplift of his people. His first two publications were medical textbooks: Antropologia (1830) and Dietetica (1831). He completed university courses in 1831 and later that year had his first direct contact with the struggling peasantry, being sent to assist with a cholera epidemic in Maramureș. He took care of the sick for ten weeks, gaining prestige from the devotion he showed.

=== Career and revolutionary involvement ===
Vasici then returned to Pest, defending his thesis in August 1832. Titled Disertatio inauguralis medica de peste orientali, it dealt with epidemic typhus. Later that month, he returned to Timișoara as a doctor in medicine, obstetrics and surgery, and began to practice medicine. His devotion to the poor led some to ask that he be named chief physician of the city, but he met opposition from certain members of the non-Romanian middle class. Thus, he sought to become head of the quarantine station in Jupalnic village in the Iron Gates area, and was hired in March 1834. Two years later, he was transferred to Timiș, in the Brașov area.

He knew German, Hungarian, Serbian and Latin; Nicolae Iorga later imagined him as "a man with a poetic bent, an open mind able to group originally his wide knowledge from different areas, and also endowed with the gift and wish to write nice, delicate, flowery prose that his fellow Romanians could understand, and whom he wished to benefit". He assisted George Bariț in educating the Romanian peasantry, contributing regularly to Foaia pentru minte, inimă și literatură from the time it was founded; and to Gazeta Transilvaniei from 1843.

Influenced by the intellectual ferment in Brașov, where revolutionaries from the Danubian Principalities took refuge, he sought to strengthen links with these Romanian-speaking areas and advocated for national unity during the Transylvanian Revolution of 1848. He continued to publish in the two periodicals after the revolution was crushed, but was particularly active at the Sibiu-based Telegraful Român. There, he was editor-in-chief from 1853 to 1856 and interim editor from 1861 to 1862. As adviser and later inspector of Romanian Orthodox schools, he made diligent efforts to improve Romanian-language education in Transylvania.

=== Politics and later years ===
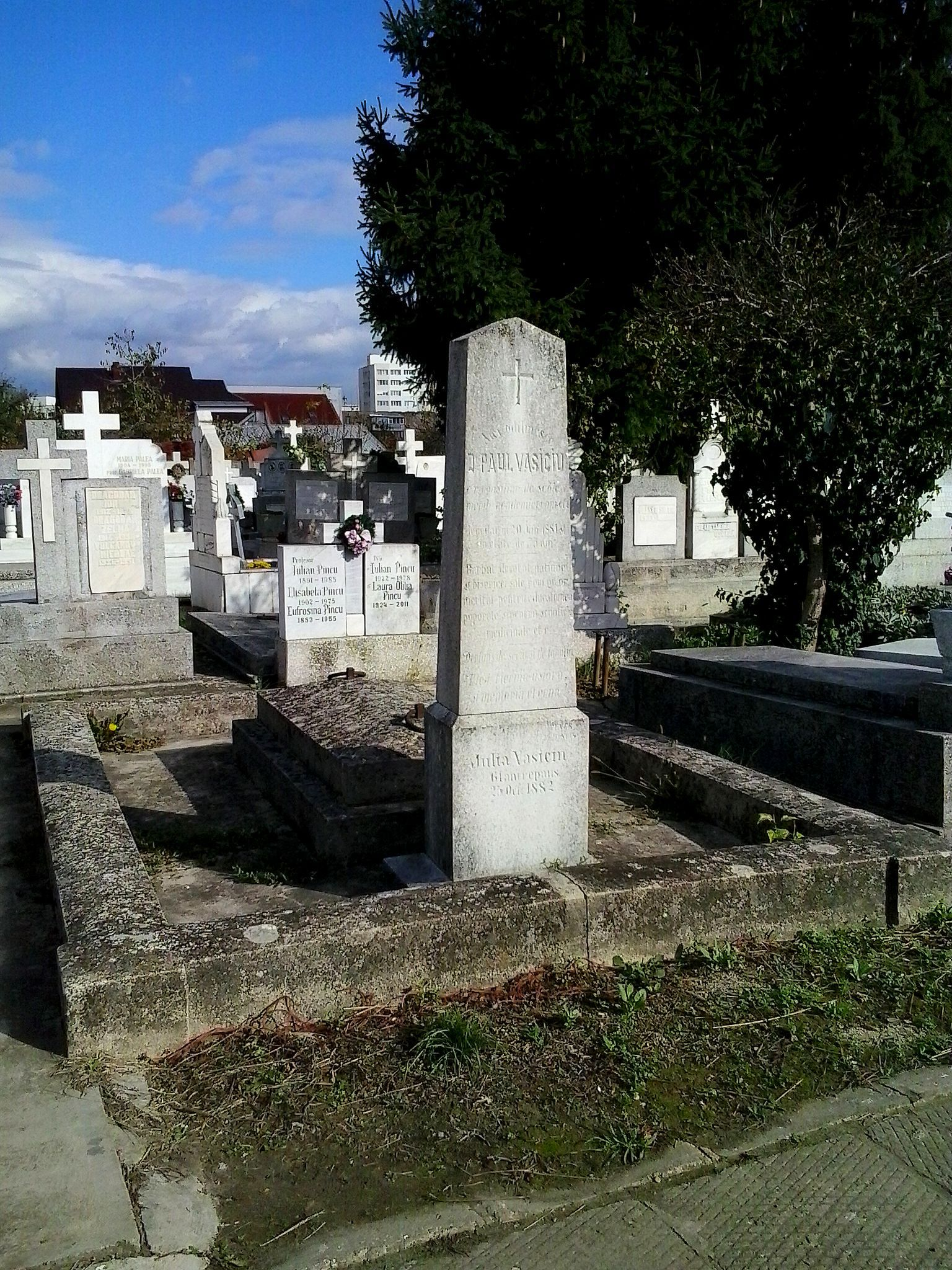
Grave in Timișoara

He was a participant in provincial politics, taking part in a January 1861 congress that elected him to a leadership role. In 1863 to 1864, he was a prominent member at the Transylvanian Diet in Sibiu that approved equal rights for Romanians. In December 1865, together with 28 other leaders, he openly refused to recognize the right of the Cluj Diet to join Transylvania to Hungary proper, on the basis that the Unio Trium Nationum did not recognize the Romanian nation.

Living at Cluj from 1865 to 1869, Vasici was profoundly disappointed by the Austro-Hungarian Compromise approved during this period. He retired in May 1869 and returned to Timișoara. Seeing that the political realm was largely closed to action, he dedicated the rest of his life to medical, hygienic and pedagogical education. In June 1879, he was elected a titular member of the Romanian Academy. He left for Bucharest, capital of the Romanian Old Kingdom, and was overjoyed to at last set foot in independent Romania. He died two years later.
