= Ștefan Gh. Nicolau =

Romanian physician, dermato-venerologist

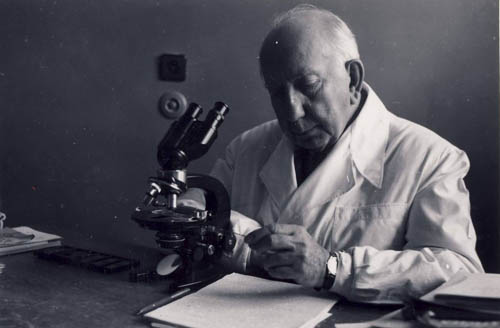
Ștefan Gh. Nicolau

Ștefan Gheorghe Nicolau (1874 in Ploiești – 1970 in Bucharest ) was a Romanian physician, dermato-venerologist. In 1948, he was elected an honorary member of the Romanian Academy.
