= Wilhelm Eitel =

German-American mineralogist

Wilhelm Hermann Julius Eitel (6 May 1891, Frankfurt am Main – 20 July 1979, United States) was a German-American scientist.

== Education ==
In Frankfurt am Main, Wilhelm Eitel completed his pre-academical training at the Wöhler-Gymnasium in 1909; after that he studied at the universities of Tübingen (1 semester) and Heidelberg (5 semesters), where, on 23 July 1912, he obtained his Ph.D. in "Mineralchemie" (mineralogical chemistry) from his promotor Professor Theodor Curtius.

== Research and Positions ==
In 1920 and 1921 Wilhelm Eitel was assistant professor in mineralogy at the university of Leipzig; from 1921 to 1926 professor at the University of Königsberg, and from 1926 to 1945 full professor in mineralogy at the Technische Hochschule in Charlottenburg (now Technische Universität Berlin) From 1926 to 1945 Professor Wilhelm Eitel also held the office of director of the "Kaiser-Wilhelm-Institut für Silicatforschung" (KWI) in Berlin (now: Fraunhofer-Institut für Silicatforschung). In this function Eitel is known to have provided ample employment for women scientists.

In December 1945 Eitel became one of the 1,500 German scientists transferred by the Office of Strategic Services to the United States during Operation Paperclip. From 1945 to 1952 Wilhelm Eitel worked for the US Navy; and from 1952 to 1961 Dr. W. Eitel held the post of director of the Silicate Research Institute at the University of Toledo, Ohio.

Dr. Eitel is the author of a multitude of scientific papers and books; he had just completed volume 8 of his monograph series "Physical Chemistry of Silicates", when he died. Wilhelm Eitel received an honorary law degree from the University of Toledo; he had been guest professor at the University of Bologna (Italy) and the Technische Hochschule Aachen.

Professor Wilhelm Eitel was a member of many professional societies, among which the British Society of Glass Technology, the American Association for the Advancement of Science, the American Ceramic Society and the Division of Engineering and Industrial Research of the National Research Council.

A wide variety of scientific problems were being studied at the KWI, including the manufacture of "Panzerglass" (bullet-proof glass) from local German raw materials and the hydrothermal synthesis of the mineral muscovite. Notably the latter research was of such great value to the Office of Strategic Services, that attention was focused on the person of Wilhelm Eitel (see: Lasby, 1971; Macrakis, 1993). One of the first tasks for Eitel in the USA was found in the "Synthetic Mica Program" at the Electronical Laboratory of the United States Bureau of Mines in Norris, Tennessee. Synthetic mica was of strategic interest to the United States, because it would have to provide an alternative for natural muscovite for use in electronic equipment.

== Nazi Involvement ==
Eitel had become a member of Hitler's NSDAP in May 1933, and remained a staunch supporter of the Nazi Party until his unsolicited transfer to the US in 1945. According to Stoff (2007) Link Wilhelm Eitel was a controversial person, the more so because he was very active within the NSDAP. In this Nazi organisation Eitel controlled the party cells inside the whole of the Kaiser-Wilhelm-Gesellschaft. Throughout World War 2 Dr. Wilhelm Eitel kept working as the Director of the Kaiser-Wilhelm-Institut of Berlin. Eitel's contributions to the German war economy consisted mainly of research on building materials such as cement and concrete to be used in building Reichsautobahnen and the bunkers of the Organisation Todt.
