= Dimitrie Cozacovici =

Romanian historian

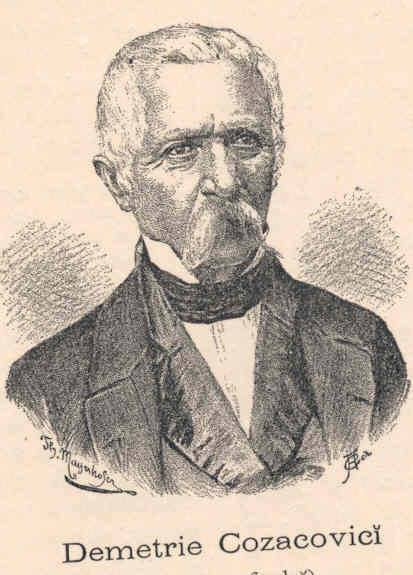
Dimitrie Cozacovici

Dimitrie Cozacovici (1790 – 31 August 1868) was a Romanian historian. He was one of the founding members of the Romanian Academy. Cozacovici was an Aromanian from Metsovo (Aromanian: Aminciu) and one of the main figures of the early Aromanian national movement. He migrated to Wallachia out of national pride feelings and became an officer in the Wallachian army in 1834. His efforts led to the establishment of an Aromanian committee in Bucharest. His surname is sometimes spelled Cosacovici or Cazacovici.
