= Ambrosiu Dimitrovici =

Romanian publisher

Ambrosiu Dimitrovici (July 20, 1838 in Chernivtsi, Austrian Empire – July 3/15, 1866 in Chernivtsi) was a publisher from the Austrian Empire of Romanian ethnicity. He was one of the founding members of the Romanian Academy.
