= Ștefan Gonata =

Romanian politician and agronomist

Ştefan Gonata (February 1, 1838, in Trifăneşti – September 18, 1896, in Chişinău) was a politician and agronomist from the Russian Empire. He was one of the founding members of the Romanian Academy.

== Biography ==
Ștefan Gonata was born on February 1, 1838, in Trifăneşti, Bessarabia. He was six years old when he lost three brothers one after the other, then his mother also died. In 1856, he graduated from the regional high school in Chisinau and went to Odesa, to the Richelieu college, which he left in the third year.

He continues his studies in Paris, where he studies philosophy and viticulture. Returning to the country, he was elected deputy for the distribution of rural tasks (1863 –1865), then deputy of the nobility in different counties.
