= Gavriil Munteanu =

Romanian scientist and translator

Gavriil Munteanu

Gavriil Munteanu (February 1812 – December 17/29, 1869) was a Romanian scientist and translator. He was one of the founding members of the Romanian Academy.

He was born in Vingard, Principality of Transylvania, and studied philosophy and law at the University of Cluj. Starting in 1835 he was a professor at Saint Sava College in Bucharest. He later taught at the seminaries in Buzău and Râmnicu Sărat. In 1851 he became the first principal of the gymnasium in Brașov.

Munteanu was co-author of an extensive German–Romanian dictionary (using preliminary work by Andreas Isser) and author of a Romanian grammar. He translated Tacitus, Suetonius, and Goethe's The Sorrows of Young Werther into Romanian.

He died in Brașov in 1869, and is buried in the city’s Groaveri cemetery.
