= Physocephalus =

Scientific classification
- Kingdom: Animalia
- Phylum: Nematoda
- Class: Chromadorea
- Order: Rhabditida
- Family: Spirocercidae
- Genus: Physocephalus; Diesing, 1861

Genus of roundworms

Physocephalus is a genus of nematodes belonging to the family Spirocercidae.

The genus has cosmopolitan distribution.

Species:

- Physocephalus meridionalis
- Physocephalus nitidulans
- Physocephalus sexalatus (Molin, 1860)
