= Constantin Ionescu-Mihăești =

Romanian physician

Constantin Ionescu-Mihăești (1883-1962) was a Romanian physician who specialized in microbiology and anatomical pathology. He became a titular member of the Romanian Academy in 1945.
