= Ioan Străjescu =

Romanian politician

Ioan Străjescu (1833–1873) was a Romanian politician. He was one of the founding members of the Romanian Academy.
