= Romanian Academy =

Academy of science

Academia Română
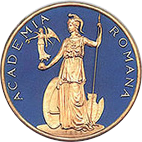

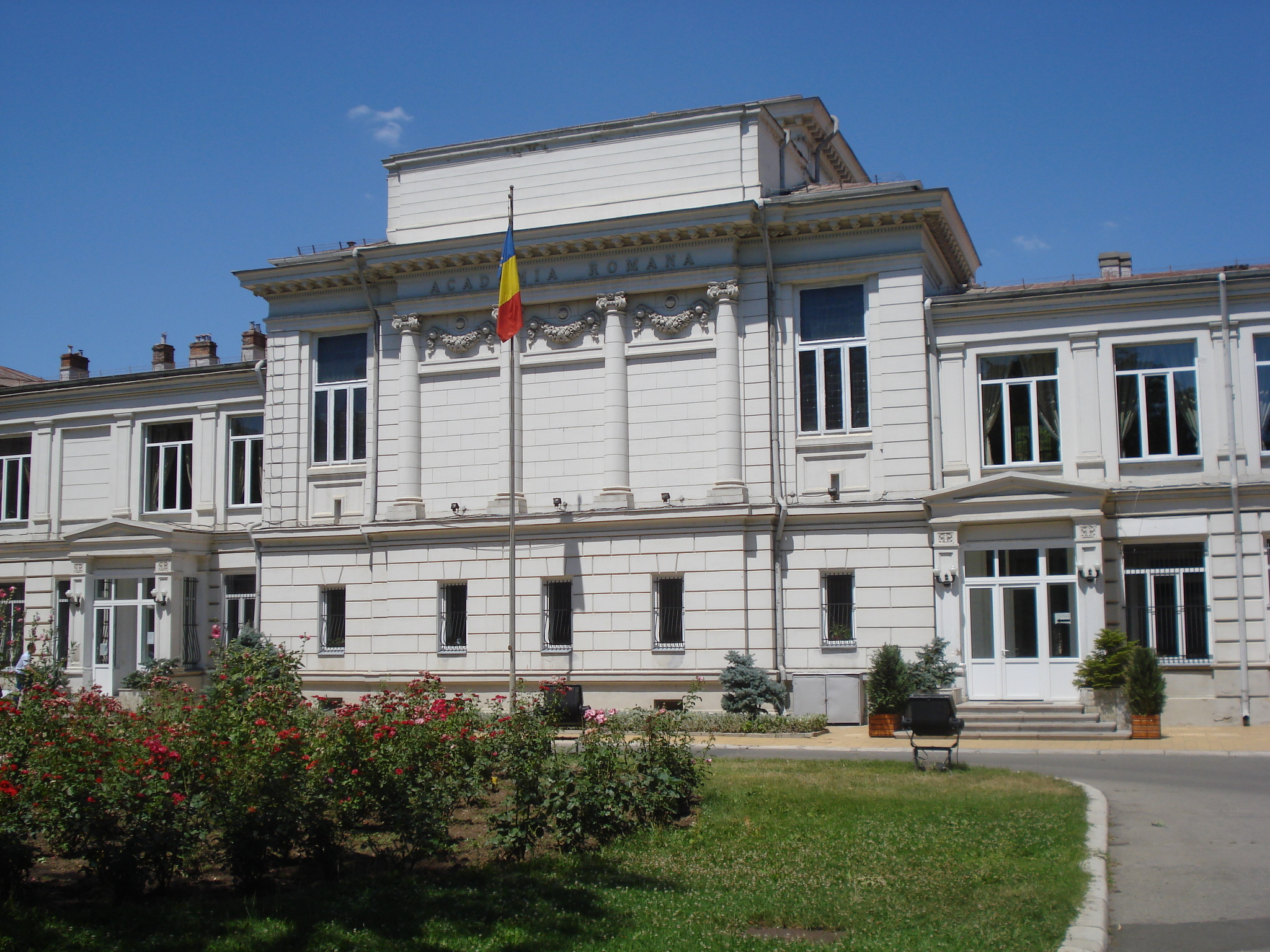
- Founded: April 1, 1866; 160 years ago
- Location: Calea Victoriei, Bucharest, Romania
- Coordinates: 44°26′46.83″N 26°5′24.02″E
- President: Ioan-Aurel Pop
- Vice presidents: Marius Andruh; Mircea Dumitru; Dumitru Murariu; Nicolae-Victor Zamfir
- General Secretary: I. Dumitrache
- Website: acad.ro

The Romanian Academy (Romanian: Academia Română [akadeˈmi.a roˈmɨnə]) is a cultural forum founded in Bucharest, Romania, in 1866. It covers the scientific, artistic and literary domains. The academy has 181 active members who are elected for life.

According to its bylaws, the academy's main goals are the cultivation of Romanian language and Romanian literature, the study of the national history of Romania and research into major scientific domains. Some of the academy's fundamental projects are the Romanian language dictionary (Dicționarul explicativ al limbii române), the dictionary of Romanian literature, and the treatise on the history of the Romanian people.

== History ==
On the initiative of C. A. Rosetti, the Academy was founded on April 1, 1866, as Societatea Literară Română. The founding members were illustrious members of the Romanian society of the age.

The name changed to Societatea Academică Romînă in 1867, and finally to Academia Română in 1879, during the reign of Carol I.

The founding members of the Academy:

Number	Name	Born	Province	Age at founding	Died	Member for	Notes
1	Vasile Alecsandri	21 July 1821	Moldavia	44 years, 254 days	22 August 1890	24 years, 143 days	
2	Vincențiu Babeș	21 January 1821	Banat	45 years, 70 days	22 January 1907	40 years, 296 days	
3	George Barițiu	4 June 1812	Transylvania	53 years, 301 days	2 May 1893	27 years, 31 days	
4	Ioan D. Caragiani	11 February 1841	Macedonia	25 years, 49 days	13 January 1921	54 years, 287 days	Aromanian
5	Timotei Cipariu	21 February 1805	Transylvania	61 years, 39 days	3 September 1887	21 years, 155 days	
6	Dimitrie Cozacovici	1790	Macedonia	76 years, 90 days	31 August 1868	2 years, 152 days	Unknown date of birth Aromanian
7	Ambrosiu Dimitrovici	20 July 1838	Bucovina	27 years, 255 days	3 July 1866	93 days	
8	Ștefan Gonata	1 February 1838	Basarabia	28 years, 59 days	18 September 1896	30 years, 170 days	
9	Alexandru Hâjdeu	30 November 1811	Basarabia	54 years, 122 days	9 November 1872	6 years, 222 days	
10	Ion Heliade Rădulescu	6 January 1802	Țara Românească	64 years, 85 days	27 April 1872	6 years, 26 days	First President of the Academy
11	Iosif Hodoș	20 October 1829	Transylvania	36 years, 163 days	28 November 1880	14 years, 241 days	
12	Alexandru Hurmuzaki	16 August 1823	Bucovina	42 years, 228 days	8 March 1871	4 years, 341 days	
13	Nicolae Ionescu	1820	Moldavia	46 years, 90 days	24 January 1905	38 years, 298 days	
14	August Treboniu Laurian	17 July 1810	Transylvania	55 years, 258 days	25 February 1881	14 years, 330 days	
15	Titu Maiorescu	15 February 1840	Țara Românească	26 years, 45 days	18 June 1917	51 years, 78 days	
16	I. C. Massim	1825	Țara Românească	41 years, 90 days	1877	10 years, 275 days	No known date of birth/death
17	Andrei Mocioni	27 June 1812	Banat	53 years, 278 days	23 April 1880	14 years, 22 days	
18	Gavriil Munteanu	February 1812	Transylvania	54 years, 59 days	17 December 1869	3 years, 260 days	
19	Costache Negruzzi	1808	Moldavia	58 years, 90 days	24 August 1868	2 years, 145 days	
20	Alexandru Roman	26 November 1826	Transylvania	39 years, 126 days	15 September 1897	31 years, 167 days	
21	C. A. Rosetti	2 June 1816	Țara Românească	49 years, 303 days	8 April 1885	19 years, 7 days	
22	Ion G. Sbiera	1 November 1835	Bucovina	30 years, 151 days	22 October 1916	50 years, 204 days	
23	Constantin Stamati	1786	Basarabia	80 years, 90 days	12 September 1869	3 years, 164 days	
24	Ioan Străjescu	1833	Basarabia	33 years, 90 days	1873	6 years, 275 days	No known date of birth/death
25	Vasile Urechea-Alexandrescu	15 February 1834	Moldavia	32 years, 45 days	21 November 1901	35 years, 234 days	

The Presidents of the Academy:

Number	Name	Term began	Term ended	Notes
1	Ion Heliade Rădulescu	1867	1870	
2	August Treboniu Laurian	1870	1872	first term
3	Nicolae Kretzulescu	1872	1873	first term
4	August Treboniu Laurian	1873	1876	second term
5	Ion Ghica	1876	1882	first term
6	Dimitrie A. Sturdza	1882	1884	
7	Ion Ghica	1884	1887	second term
8	Mihail Kogălniceanu	1887	1890	
9	Ion Ghica	1890	1893	third term
10	George Bariț	5 April 1893	2 May 1893	died in office
11	Iacob C. Negruzzi	1893	1894	first term
12	Ion Ghica	1894	1895	fourth term
13	Nicolae Kretzulescu	1895	1898	second term
14	Petru Poni	1898	1901	first term
15	Petre S. Aurelian	1901	1904	
16	Ioan Kalinderu	1904	1907	
17	Anghel Saligny	1907	1910	
18	Iacob C. Negruzzi	1910	1913	second term
19	Constantin I. Istrati	1913	1916	
20	Petru Poni	1916	1920	second term
21	Dimitrie Onciul	1920	1923	
22	Iacob C. Negruzzi	1923	1926	third term
23	Emil Racoviță	1926	1929	
24	Ioan Bianu	1929	1932	
25	Ludovic Mrazek	1932	1935	
26	Alexandru Lapedatu	1935	1938	
27	Constantin Rădulescu-Motru	1938	1941	
28	Ion Th. Simionescu	1941	1944	
29	Dimitrie Gusti	1944	1946	
30	Andrei Rădulescu	1946	12 August 1948	
31	Traian Săvulescu	12 August 1948	23 December 1959	
32	Athanase Joja	1959	1963	
33	Ilie G. Murgulescu	1963	1966	
34	Miron Nicolescu	8 April 1966	30 June 1975	died in office
	Șerban Țițeica	1975	1976	acting
35	Theodor Burghele	1976	3 June 1977	died in office
	Cristofor Simionescu	3 June 1977	19 March 1980	acting
36	Gheorghe Mihoc	19 March 1980	25 December 1981	died in office
	Ioan Anton	25 December 1981	13 November 1984	acting
37	Radu Voinea	13 November 1984	2 February 1990	
38	Mihai Drăgănescu	2 February 1990	18 January 1994	
39	Virgiliu N. G. Constantinescu	1994	1998	
40	Eugen Simion	16 January 1998	20 April 2006	
41	Ionel Haiduc	20 April 2006	8 April 2014	
42	Ionel Valentin Vlad	8 April 2014	24 December 2017	died in office
	Cristian Hera	5 January 2018	5 April 2018	acting
43	Ioan-Aurel Pop	5 April 2018	present	

== Library ==
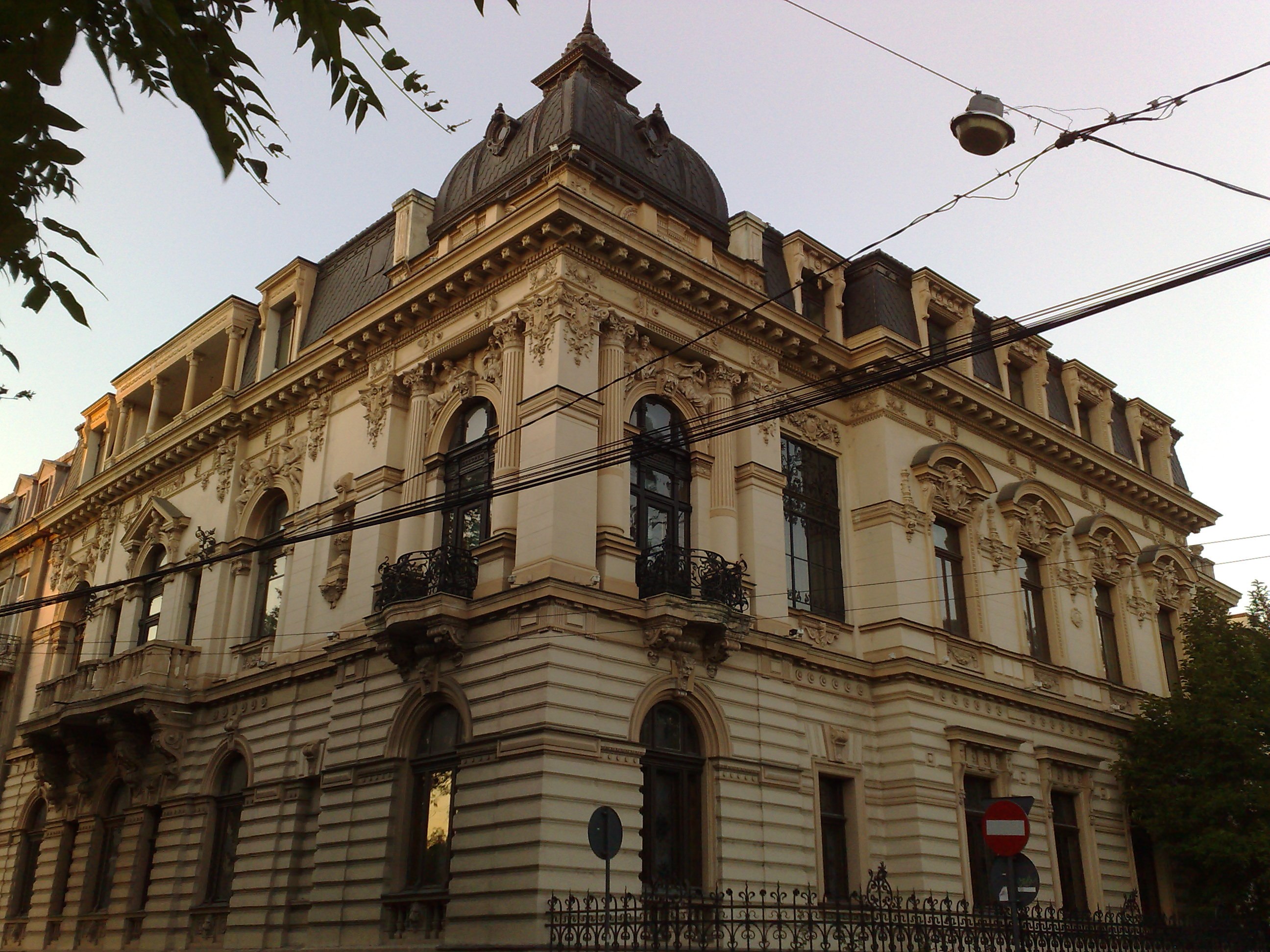
The Romanian Academy Library building

Established in 1867, the Bibilioteca Academiei Române has a collection of over seven million books and collections of drawings, engravings, maps, and coins. The Academy also operates its own publishing house.

== See also ==
- List of members of the Romanian Academy
- List of purged members of the Romanian Academy
- Romanian Academy of Sciences
