= Hațieganu =

Hațieganu is a Romanian surname. Notable people with the surname include:

- Emil Hațieganu (1878–1959), Romanian politician and jurist
- Iuliu Hațieganu, brother of Emil
  - Iuliu Hațieganu University of Medicine and Pharmacy
