= Florian Ștefănescu-Goangă =

Romanian psychologist (1881–1958)

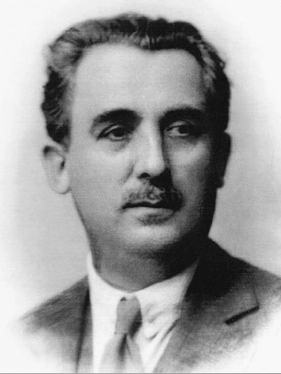
Florian Ștefănescu-Goangă

Florian Ștefănescu-Goangă (born Florian Ștefănescu;^{[a]} 5 April 1881 – 26 March 1958) was a Romanian psychologist. The son of a peasant family from Curtea de Argeș, he attended the University of Bucharest, followed by doctoral studies in psychology at Leipzig University under Wilhelm Wundt. Following World War I, he became a professor at the newly founded University of Cluj, emerging as a pioneer in experimental psychology in Romania over the ensuing decades. He led the university between 1932 and 1940, also serving in government for a time. An assassination attempt against him in 1938 precipitated the killing of Iron Guard leader Corneliu Zelea Codreanu. After 1945, he initially worked with the new communist government, but his insistence on an apolitical teaching environment ultimately saw him held at Sighet prison from 1950 to 1955, and he died three years after his release.

== Biography ==
=== Education and research ===
Born in Curtea de Argeș, his parents Ion and Maria were landed peasants (moșneni) who owned a mill and an apiary. He attended primary school in his native town, followed by Matei Basarab High School in the national capital Bucharest. After graduation in 1899, he entered the University of Bucharest, where he studied literature and philosophy, earning a degree in 1904. For the next several years, he taught Romanian language and philosophy at high schools in Craiova and then Galați. In 1908, he married Elena Papadopol, the daughter of a very wealthy family of Greek descent from the latter city. The same year, with his wife's money and accompanied by her, he left for Leipzig University to pursue a doctorate. He specialized in experimental psychology and studied under Wilhelm Wundt, who endorsed his doctorate in 1911. This work dealt with color and affective response.

In 1919, he became a professor at the newly established Romanian University of Cluj, situated in the capital of Transylvania, which had recently united with Romania at the close of World War I. His favorite students would be Liviu Rusu and Nicolae Mărgineanu. In 1927, he established an experimental psychology laboratory, which became a separate institute the following year, the first of its kind in Romania. In 1929, he founded a publishing house for the institute, which brought out 34 monographs, mainly doctoral theses defended at the institute. In 1931, he laid the foundation for a psychology society divided into four sections: educational psychology, behavioral economics, legal psychology and medical psychology.

Thanks to him, the journal Revista de psihologie teoretică și aplicată appeared between 1938 and 1949. He helped introduce psychological records for pupils in schools throughout the country, to set up a psychological service for Căile Ferate Române railway carrier, and to found psycho-technical institutes at Cluj and Bucharest, as well as professional development offices at Arad, Brașov and Cluj. Among his more noteworthy books are Selecțiunea capacităților și orientarea profesională ("Ability Selection and Professional Orientation"; 1929), Instabilitatea emotivă ("Emotional Instability"; 1936), Constituție biopsihică și criminalitate ("Biophysical Makeup and Criminality"; 1938), Adaptarea socială ("Social Adaptation"; 1938), Educația copiilor inferior și superior dotați ("The Education of Poorly and Richly Gifted Children"; 1939) and Măsurarea inteligenței ("The Measure of Intelligence"; 1940). A eugenicist, he was a prominent advocate of selecting students and curricula based on class identity, which he asserted was tied to mental development.

=== University administrator and government official ===
He served as rector of Cluj University between 1932 and 1940. As such, he played a prominent role in the building of an Academic College. More broadly, his rectorial term coincided with the Great Depression and a serious shortfall in university funding, so that he consistently used his position to call for budgetary increases. As early as 1924, when Sextil Pușcariu proposed inviting Lucian Blaga to teach at Cluj, he stood in opposition due to a wish to bring in one of his own students. Antipathies toward Blaga's literary style and philosophical outlook among the faculty, led by Gheorghe Bogdan-Duică and seconded by Ștefănescu-Goangă, continued for years. By 1935, a press campaign was calling on Blaga to be admitted as a professor, but Ștefănescu-Goangă was rumored to be holding the position for his student Rusu. He finally relented in 1938, when Blaga was hired to lecture on the philosophy of culture. Meanwhile, a special department of modern Romanian culture had been created for Octavian Goga in 1936.

A member of the National Liberal Party (PNL), he was undersecretary of state at the Education Ministry between 1936 and 1937, serving under Gheorghe Tătărescu. According to his own account, he was brought into government in order to restore order into a university system that was plagued by disturbances and terror from the Iron Guard. For acting against the group, its leadership decided he should die. In November 1938, a wave of Guardist terrorism led the Cluj police chief to order round-the-clock protection for Ștefănescu-Goangă. In response to the consequent arrest of over forty members, the Guard activated its plan to eliminate him. On the afternoon of 28 November, while he was walking to class, a group of five assassins fired five shots at him. Three hit the professor, who survived but lay bedridden for four months. The policeman who was accompanying him was killed on the spot. The shooting was used by King Carol II as a pretext to retaliate against the Guard. Two days later, fourteen of its most prominent members, including its leader Corneliu Zelea Codreanu, were taken from their prison and shot dead on a deserted road. When the university had to withdraw to Sibiu in 1940 as a result of the Second Vienna Award, he organized its orderly transition to another city, although himself settled in Bucharest, working at a government ministry. When the university moved back to Cluj in 1945, he resumed teaching there, to the acclaim of students and faculty.

=== Postwar course ===
In spite of his anti-communist reflexes, he sided with Salvator Cupcea and Alexandru Roșca in pushing for Mărgineanu's dismissal from the faculty, hoping to save his own position and initially gaining favor with the Romanian Communist Party. In his memoirs, Mărgineanu noted he had concealed from his mentor the presence of Roșca among his would-be assassins, and the involvement of both men, while Guard members, in the campaign against him. Ștefănescu-Goangă was very active in the Cluj Romanian Society for Friendship with the Soviet Union chapter. He insisted on hosting the founding meeting in his own home (his wife's property), later putting up a plaque reminding viewers of Romania's struggle alongside the USSR in the closing period of World War II. He defected from the PNL to the Communist-allied National Liberal Party–Tătărescu, and headed the candidate list for Giurgiu in the 1946 election, winning a seat in the Assembly of Deputies.

However, as an opponent of politicizing higher education, he eventually drew the anger of the communist press. Elected a corresponding member of the Romanian Academy in May 1937, he was stripped of his membership by the new communist regime in 1948, but posthumously restored in July 1990, after the Romanian Revolution. Due to the fact that he had served under a "bourgeois" government, he was held at Sighet prison between 1950 and 1955. His books, manuscripts and letters were burned, his Cluj house expropriated, his personal property seized. He died in 1958, three years after being released from prison. Of his four children, one daughter studied literature and philosophy, with the rest opting for the polytechnic or architecture.

The cognomen Goangă was adopted later in life.

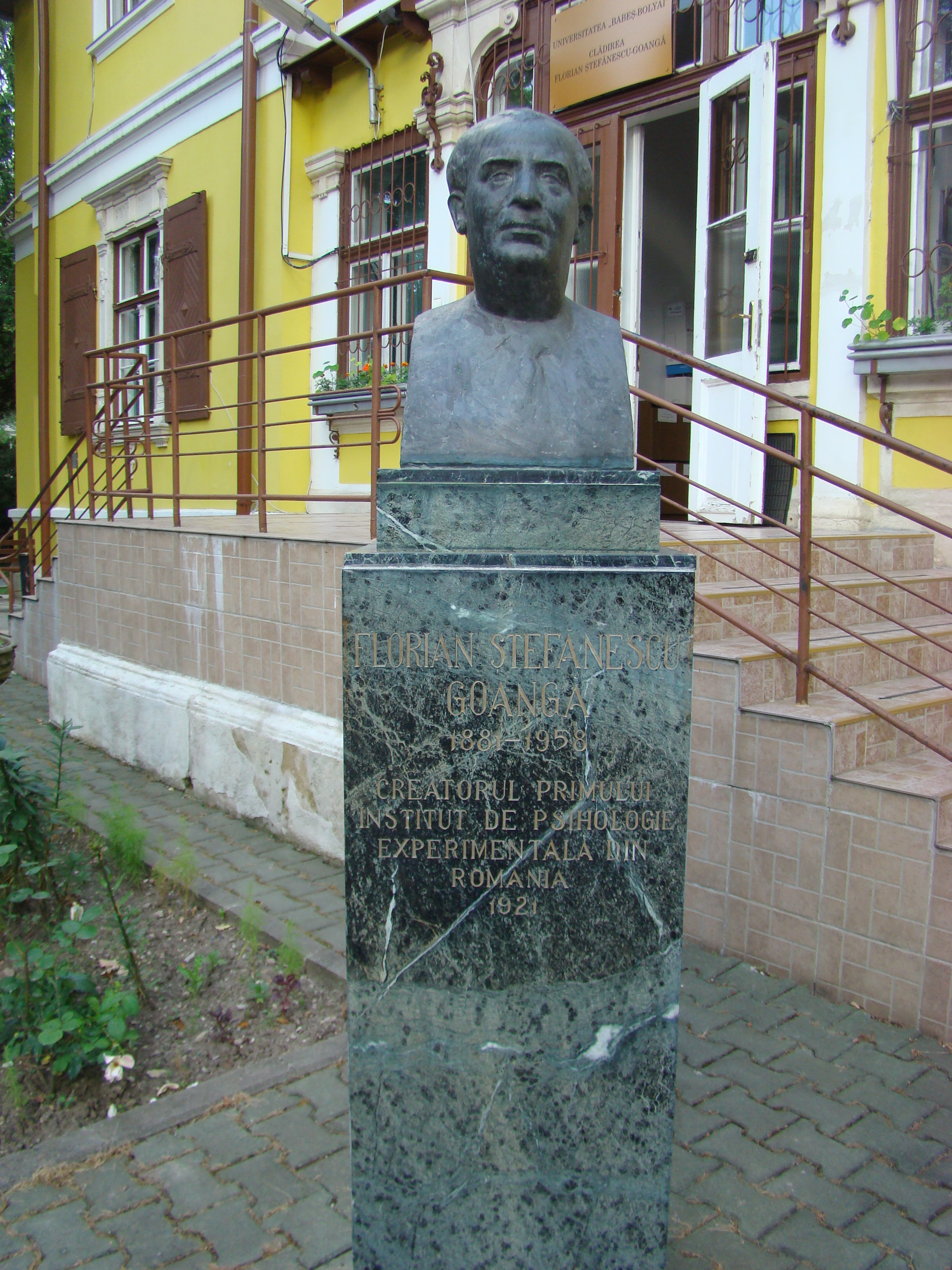
Bust in Cluj

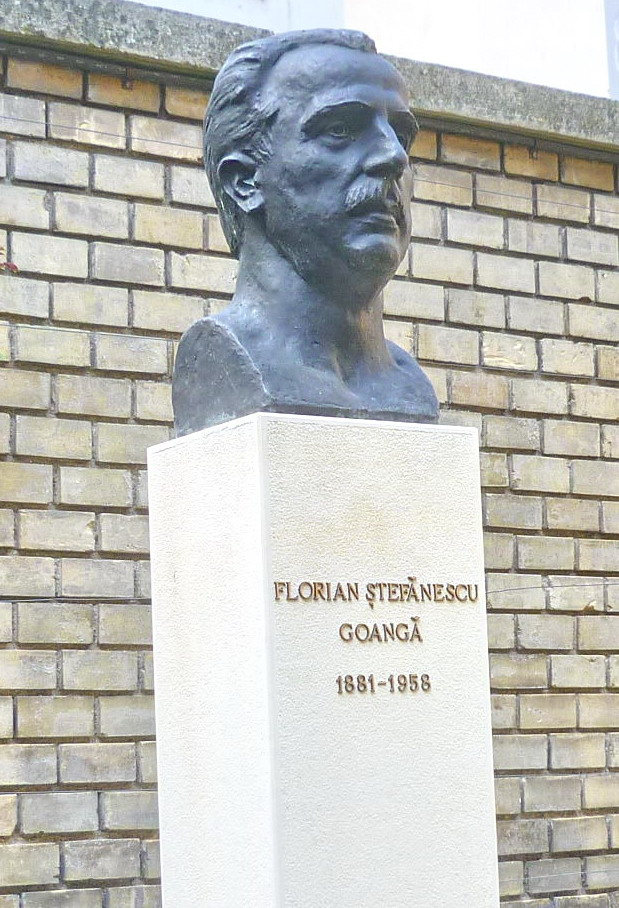
Bust in Cluj

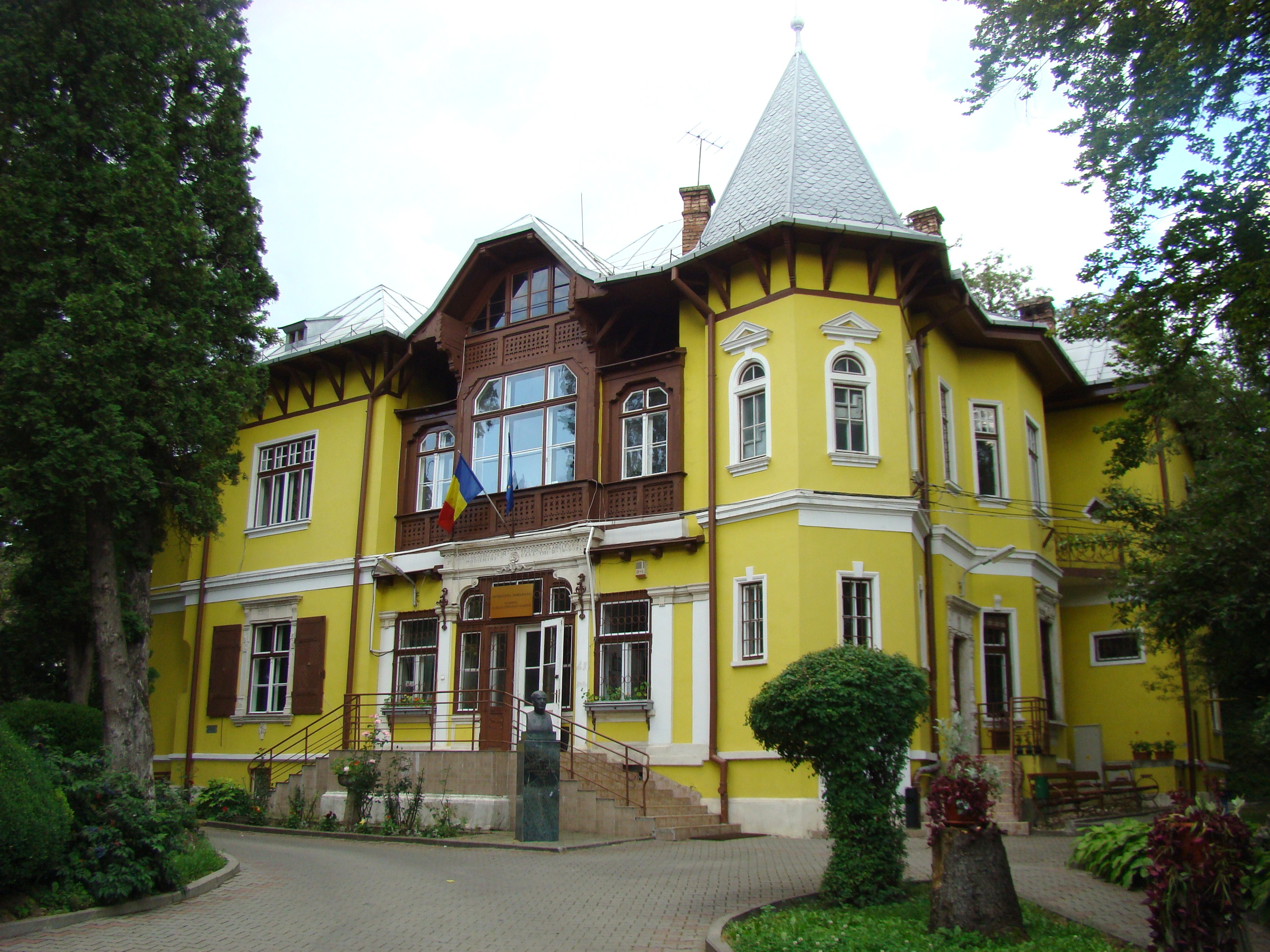
Ștefănescu-Goangă's Cluj home, now the psychological institute
