= Salvator Cupcea =

Romanian psychiatrist (1908–1958)

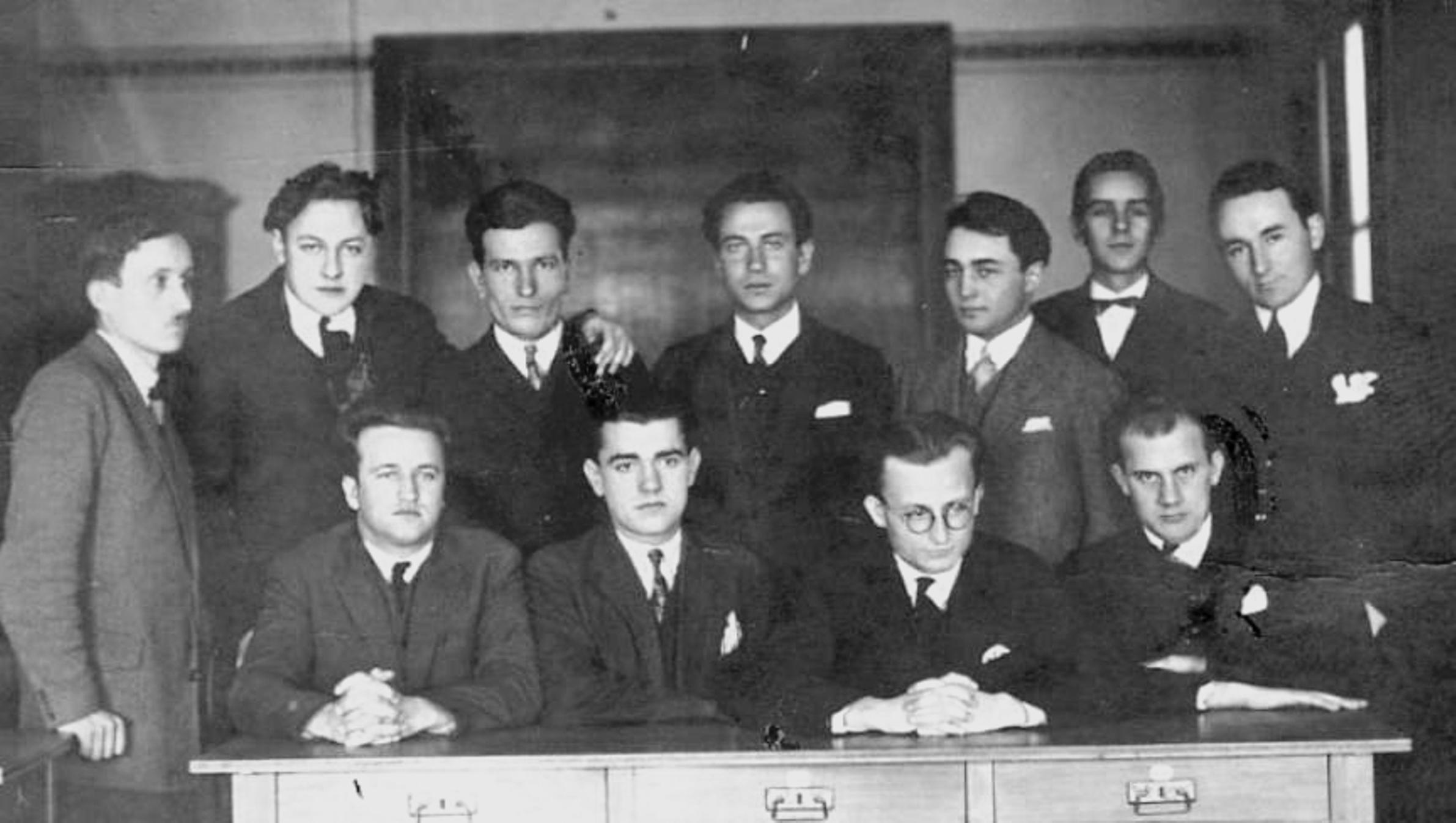
Cupcea (standing, second from the left), with Alexandru Roșca, Lucian Bologa, Nicolae Mărgineanu, Liviu Rusu, Teodor Bugnariu and various others, at the Psychology Institute, in or around 1928

Salvator P. Cupcea (also known as Salvador Cupcea; August 8, 1908 – 1958) was a Romanian psychologist, physician, and political figure. From beginnings as a researcher for the Victor Babeș University of Cluj, alongside his friend Alexandru Roșca, he became noted as a pioneer of experimental psychology and psychoanalysis, studying in particular the social marginals. He later immersed himself in the social hygiene and eugenics movement, also specializing in genetic medicine, biological anthropology, and criminology. A collaborator of Iuliu Moldovan, he taught classes at the latter's Institute for much of World War II, when he focused on studying the intelligence of various body types.

During those years, Cupcea flirted with fascism, and endorsed a biopolitical "national hygiene" program. In 1944, he reemerged as a supporter of the Romanian Communist Party and liberal eugenics, serving as Health Minister and representative to the World Health Organization. A founder of the Cluj Medical University and administrator of its Psychiatric Clinic, his final work was in human ecology, food science, and cardiology.

== Biography ==
=== Origins and family ===
Salvator was born in Carei (Nagykároly), Szatmár County, at the time part of Austria-Hungary. His was a family of importance in the Romanian Eastern Catholic community of Crișana region. His father, Petru Cupcea (1875–1940), was a priest, later the Protopope of Supur and honorary Archdeacon, who was active in the Romanian National Party from 1909. Although ethnically Romanian, his paternal and maternal ancestors, the Cupceas and the Rednics, had been received into the Hungarian nobility of Partium, tracing their aristocratic titles to 1609 and 1349 respectively. Petru's wife, Augusta, was the distant descendant of peasants from Tiream, and daughter of George Pteancu. A Romanian educator and honorary citizen of Carei, Pteancu was also leader of the Marian Congregation branch in Năsăud. Augusta's brother, Alexandru Coriolan Pteancu (1878–1956), was a theologian, antiquarian, schoolteacher, political figure, and honorary Protopope.

The couple, who moved frequently in keeping up with Father Cupcea's successive assignments, had six children born in various localities, of whom Salvator and three sisters reached maturity. The eldest, Maria (1903–1980), was an educator, composer, and celebrated stage and film actress. She was for a while married one of Salvator's physician colleagues, Victor Munteanu, and had a son by him, Dan Munteanu, who became a noted biologist. Another sister, Lucia, became the wife of Leontin Ghergariu (1897–1980), a philologist, adult educator, museum curator and sports enthusiast. The youngest of the Cupcea siblings, Emilia, taught at the Biological Institute of Cluj.

Cupcea's early childhood saw the dissolution of Austria-Hungary and the region's incorporation with Romania. Directly involved in the process, Alexandru Pteancu was appointed chief inspector of secondary schools by the Romanian-led Regional Directorate. There followed an interlude of Hungarian Soviet rule, during which Inspector Pteancu narrowly escaped execution. Father Cupcea, who had pledged Carei's support for the Great Assembly, was also targeted, being kidnapped and sent to Debrecen, where he was reportedly tortured. Rescued by his coreligionists, he made his way to Oradea, which fell to the Romanians in the military operations of 1919.

=== Early career ===
In 1925, when Crișana had been secured for Greater Romania, Salvator graduated from Carei's Lucaciu High School, where he had become best friends with his schoolmate, Alexandru Roșca. They both had a keen interest in psychology, and were urged on by their schoolteachers to pursue studies in the field. Enlisting at the University of Cluj (known back then as "Upper Dacia University"), they attended the Faculty of Letters and Philosophy, specializing under Professor Florian Ștefănescu-Goangă at the Cluj Institute of Psychology. Together, they worked on Ștefănescu-Goangă's applied psychology teams, alongside various other young men who became figures of importance on the scientific, political, and literary scene: Nicolae Mărgineanu, Mihai Beniuc, Liviu Rusu, Lucian Bologa, and Teodor Bugnariu.

Taking a degree in Psychology, Pedagogy and Aesthetics (February 1931), Cupcea also attended the Faculty of Medicine, where he earned a diploma in psychiatry, after which he took a position on the staff of the Mental Hospital in Sibiu. In early 1935, he was among the founders of the Romanian Psychoanalytic Circle and an editor of its magazine, Revista Română de Psihanaliză, with which he sought to promote a more complete understanding of Sigmund Freud and his work. Together with fellow Freudians Ioan I. Popescu-Sibiu, G. Preda, and Anastase Dosios, he worked on Cercetări de psihologie experimentală la alienați ("Studies in Experimental Psychology among the Insane").

In 1938, Cupcea became a contributor to Ștefănescu-Goangă's academic journal, Revista de Psihologie, where he wrote an introduction to psychological evaluation techniques. Also that year, together with Ștefănescu-Goangă and Roșca, he published a study on Adaptarea socială ("Social Adaptation"), which looked into the social careers of misfits: 3,300 criminals, 9,636 victims of suicide, and 434 mental patients. The authors found that maladaptation was critical among women and Székelys, that most homicides occurred in Oltenia, southern Moldavia and Ciuc, and that most suicides were reported in Transylvania. With Mihai Kernbach and Vasile Hurghișiu, he co-authored other work in medical jurisprudence, presenting his findings at the 21 Congress of Legal Medicine, in Bonn. Cupcea ultimately became a Doctor of Medicine in March 1939.

=== Moldovan's aide ===
While Bugnariu affiliated with the underground Romanian Communist Party (PCdR), Cupcea and Roșca were drawn into fascist politics. As noted by author Nicolae Balotă, who was also an employee of the Psychology Institute, they "contributed discreetly (and, what is more, prudently)" to the Iron Guard. Cupcea's father, meanwhile, was a leader of the mainstream National Peasants' Party in Sălaj County and a figure of importance in local democratic circles, especially active in the propaganda effort against Hungarian irredentism.

In 1940, at the height of World War II, Northern Transylvania, including Cluj, was ceded by Romania to Hungary following the Second Vienna Award. The entire university and its logistics moved to Sibiu. Cupcea remained in contact with his colleagues, publishing in Revista de Psihologie: in 1941, Constituția morfologică la bolnavii mintal ("The Morphological Built of the Mentally Ill"); in 1944, Încercarea unui sistem de psihopatologie constituțională evolutiv ("Sketching a System of Progressive Bodily Psychopathology"). He based these studies on the impact of health on intelligence, and the theories of Ernst Kretschmer, by examining the body types of university students, industrial workers and mental patients in relation to their intelligence quotient and state of mind, describing various correlations. A disciple of physician and eugenicist Iuliu Moldovan, he frequented ASTRA Society and published in its paper the 1941 tract Ce este Eugenia ("What Eugenics Is"). It discussed "the improvement of the genetic dowry" through both positive and negative measures. Quoting Moldovan and Francis Galton, Cupcea tried to delimit his field of interest from Nazi racial science (too radical) and euthenics (too mild), preferring Moldovan's term "hygiene of the nation". At the time, he expressed himself as a supporter of strict biological determinism, and demanded the universal introduction of prenuptial examinations to filter out the dysgenics.

Cupcea later became editor of Revista de Psihologie, also serving on the staffs of Medicina Românească review and the Romanian Psychiatric Society. Described by his friends as a "gentleman of imposing stature" and a fine public speaker, he was attracted into teaching. From 1942, he hosted a seminar of "mental hygiene" and medical genetics, under Moldovan's guidance. In 1943, the university assigned him a lecturer's position in his alma mater, the Faculty of Medicine, where his oratorical skill drew in crowds. Cupcea also affiliated with Moldovan's Institute of Hygiene and Biopolitics, as a researcher, and, taking a diploma in Public Health and Hygiene in 1944, as a section leader. His studies merged psychiatry and criminology, investigating the role of emotional instability disorder as a gateway to other psychiatric conditions in the general population, and its supposed presence as "impulsiveness" among the criminal population.

In August 1944, King Michael's Coup aligned Romania with the Allies, while also ushering in a Soviet occupation. Discarding fascism, Cupcea and Roșca sought a rapprochement with the PCdR, passing themselves off as committed communists. ASTRA published Cupcea's introduction to Biologia teoretică şi aplicată în U.R.S.S. ("Theoretical and Applied Biology in the USSR"), which was a condemnation of scientific racism and social Darwinism, as well as a tentative defense of non-racial eugenics. The article announced that the era of eugenics as a separate discipline was coming to an end, as eugenics had infused the work values of Soviet biologists, especially those at the Maxim Gorky Medico-Biological Research Institute. In one of his eugenic tracts for that year, he circulated the notion that genes "do not produce characteristics per se, but rather provide certain evolutionary guidelines", which suggested to his readers that pedagogy had a major role in cultivating innate qualities.

=== Ministerial post and later life ===
In 1945, Cupcea joined the Health Ministry staff as a general secretary, under Premier Petru Groza and Minister Dumitru Bagdasar. On April 11, 1946, preparing for his retirement, Bagdasar delegated to Cupcea "all the rights that come with the office of minister [...], excepting those that are strictly reserved for the minister as head of his department and cannot therefore be delegated." Following Bagdasar's resignation and death, Cupcea effectively became the acting minister.

In August 1946, he spoke at the national conference on people's health, where he presented a report on the dire conditions facing "today's democratic government": "One million syphilitics, one and a half million gonorrhea victims, 600,000 tuberculosis victims, an 18 per cent infant mortality—that is the legacy of our past, the legacy of historical regimes". In parallel, Cupcea was assigned the Chair of Mental Hygiene and Medical Genetics at the Cluj Hygiene Institute in September. On May 9, 1947, he was created a Commander of the Star of Romania.

Later that year, he resigned from his political posts and became manager of the Cluj University Psychiatric Clinic, taking over from Iuliu Hațieganu, who had been purged by the communists. In 1948, when, with his help, the Faculty of medicine became a Medical University, he was made a full professor of hygiene, and soon after served as Dean. In parallel, he worked on a regional medical task-force formed by the Romanian Academy, while presiding over the Hygiene Institute, the Cluj clinics, and the local Medical Society. In 1948, he was one of three Romanian representatives to the founding congress of the World Health Organization, where he proposed the creation of a Mental Hygiene Committee and concrete backing for national research programs. For a while, he also headed a Cluj section of the Romanian–Soviet Institute. During those years, with Ștefănescu-Goangă and Roșca, he became involved in a cabal against their former colleague Mărgineanu, whom they denounced to the Securitate.

With Leon Daniello, Leon Prodan, and 11 other researchers, he contributed the monograph Silicoza și silicotuberculoza ("Silicosis and Silicotuberculosis"), which earned him the State Prize for 1952. He also worked alongside Aurel Moga in investigating cardiovascular disease, making significant predictions about the contributing role of cholesterol intake, and exploring connections between human ecology and biological anthropology. Later, Cupcea pioneered the study of ionization as an air pollution indicator. He died suddenly in 1958, at Cluj.
