= Neural organoid =

3D in vitro tissue culture system

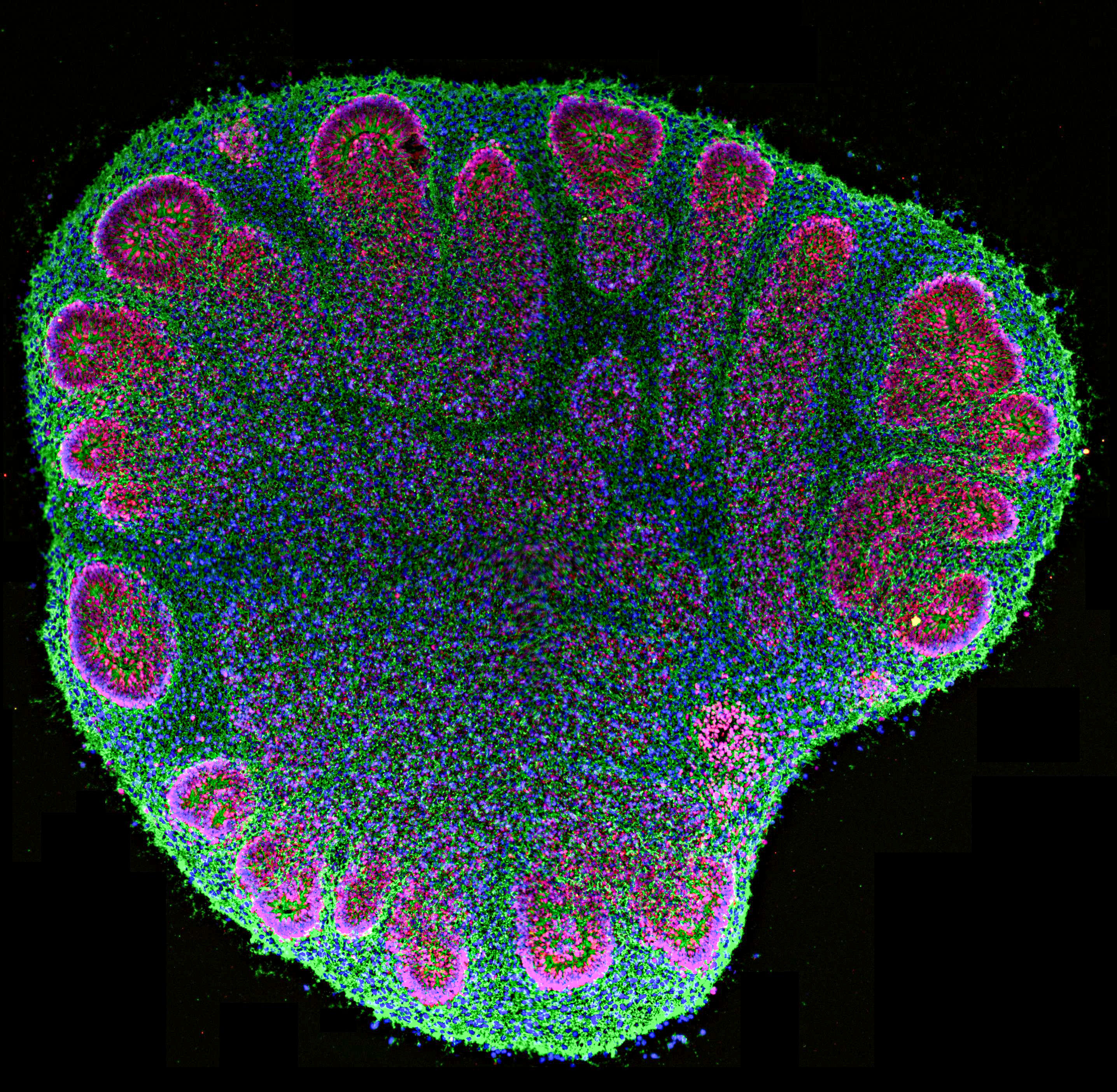
Cross-section of a two-month-old Neural organoid.

A neural organoid (or nervous system organoid) is a 3D in vitro tissue culture system used to model regions of the nervous system. They are typically derived from pluripotent stem cells. As an umbrella term, neural organoids encompasses various models including cerebral organoids, spinal organoids, and retinal organoids. Neural organoid models are used as tools in developmental biology, drug discovery, and the study of neurological disease. They provide cellular environments more similar to in vivo than traditional 2D cultures.

The field emerged in the early 21st century through the work of Yoshiki Sasai and was significantly expanded by the laboratories of Jürgen Knoblich (notably with Madeline Lancaster) and Sergiu P. Pașca, who developed protocols for "unguided" whole-brain models and "guided" region-specific models, respectively. In 2022, a consortium of leading researchers established a formal nomenclature to standardize the classification of these tissues and their fused derivatives, known as assembloids.

== Types ==
Neural organoids can be categorised into multiple subtypes based on the differentiation strategy used. Cerebral organoids are typical examples of unguided models that rely on intrinsic signaling to produce a complex combination of neural tissue types. Regionalised organoids are guided models where extrinsic signaling is used to guide cells towards more specific fates. Regionalised models can include: Cortical, Thalamic, Retinal, and Spinal organoids. The most recent category in the field is the Neural Assembloid, which are fusions of different types of guided models or guided models with specific cell types, allowing for more complexity while still controlling the underlying specificity of cell types involved.

== Nomenclature ==
The terminology for neural organoids varies based on the differentiation strategy used:

- Unguided: Organoids generated through intrinsic self-organisation and endogenous signalling, leading to a diversity of cell types. This method typically produces complex tissues containing multiple brain regions and non-neuronal cell types (e.g. choroid plexus, meninges). The original Cerebral organoid is the primary example of this category.
- Guided: Organoids generated using specific exogenous factors (such as small molecules or morphogens) to direct differentiation toward highly specific cell identities (e.g., dorsal cortex only). This term is preferred over "directed". These are often referred to as spheroids/regionalised organoids.
- Regionalised: Organoids that have been restricted to represent a single, highly specific neural region (e.g., spinal cord, midbrain, or retina), usually achieved through guided differentiation protocols.
- Selected: Neural organoids generated from cells that have been isolated via FACS sorting or dissection prior to 3D culture to ensure lineage purity.
- Assembloid: A structure formed by physically fusing an organoid/spheroid with other organoids/spheroids or distinct cell types (e.g., fusing a cortical spheroid with a striatal spheroid).

== History ==
The development of neural organoids emerged from early experiments in stem cell biology and tissue engineering, shifting from 2D neural cultures to three-dimensional (self-organising) tissues.

=== Early self-organisation ===
Yoshiki Sasai and colleagues established the foundational technology for neural organoids at the RIKEN Centre for Developmental Biology in the early 21st century. In 2008, Sasai's group developed the SFEBq (serum-free floating culture of embryoid body-like aggregates with quick reaggregation) method. This technique demonstrated that pluripotent stem cells could intrinsically self-organise into polarised cortical tissues without the support of external scaffolds. This work was later expanded in 2011 to generate self-organising optic cups (retina), proving that complex neural structures could form purely through intrinsic cellular programs. Sasai's SFEBq method established the principles of intrinsic self-organisation that underpin both modern unguided protocols (Lancaster) and guided cortical induction methods (Pașca).

=== Divergence of protocols (2013–2017) ===
Following Sasai's pioneering work, the field diverged into two primary methodologies:

==== Whole-brain modelling (unguided) ====
In 2013, the work of Madeline Lancaster and Jürgen Knoblich developed the Cerebral organoid protocol. By embedding neuroepithelial tissues in Matrigel droplets and culturing them in spinning bioreactors, they improved nutrient absorption and enabled the tissues to grow larger with increased complexity. This method promoted unguided differentiation, resulting in "whole brain" organoids that contain multiple brain regions (forebrain, midbrain, hindbrain) as well as non-neuronal structures such as the choroid plexus.

==== Region-specific modelling (guided) ====
From 2015, researchers developed methods to restrict differentiation to specific neural lineages using small molecules (guided differentiation). The lab of Sergiu Pașca established the cortical spheroid protocol, which uses dual SMAD inhibition to direct cells toward a dorsal forebrain fate.

In 2017, Jürgen Knoblich's group (Bagley et al.) further expanded guided methodologies to generate ventral forebrain (subpallial) organoids using specific morphogens. By treating tissues with WNT inhibitors and SHH agonists, they successfully patterned organoids to represent the medial ganglionic eminence (MGE). These guided protocols also enable the generation of highly reproducible, region-specific tissues that can be subsequently fused to study neural circuits.

=== Neural assembloids ===
Assembloids are 3D organoid systems generated by fusing different organoid/spheroid/cell-types to produce a functional integrated system. The first assembloid types were neural, but have since expanded to other tissue models.

Guided protocols generate specific cell types, often reflecting cell populations from discrete regions. These protocols can make it difficult to understand how tissues interact. For example, whole-brain function or the interactions between different cell types or brain regions. To overcome this limitation, researchers can combine these organoids/spheroids/cell-types to generate more complex systems.

In 2017, three labs published protocols for fusing regionalised organoids: "Assembled Spheroids" (Pașca), "Fused Organoids" (Knoblich), and "Fused MGE-cortical Organoids" (Park). Due to the close timeline of these publications, they are generally considered simultaneous discovery.

==== Terminology ====
Initial publications in 2017 referred to these structures as 'Assembled Spheroids' (Pașca) or 'Fused Organoids' (Knoblich, Park). The specific term Assembloid was not used in the original 2017 literature; it was first introduced by Pașca in a 2018 interview and later formalised in a 2019 review.

=== Consensus ===
In 2022, a consortium of leading researchers published a consensus statement establishing "Neural organoid" (or "Nervous system organoid") as the primary umbrella term encompassing all 3D neural models, including cerebral organoids, retinal organoids, and assembloids. They also agreed that all of the "fused" and "assembled" organoids would go by the term Assembloid in the future. The term "Neural organoid" can also be used as a generic term for Neural organoids that comprise multiple neural cell types from across multiple neural tissues.
