= Sidonia =

- Gender: Female (typically) or male

Origin
- Origin: Ancient Roman
- Meaning: "of Sidon"

Other names
- See also: Sidonie, Sidonija, Sidoniya, Sydonia, Szidónia, Sida, Sido, Szidi, Donya, Donka, Sodka, Sidonius

Sidonia or Sidonie is a feminine given name which may refer to:

== People ==
- Sidonie of Bavaria (1488–1505), eldest daughter of Duke Albert IV of Bavaria-Munich, wife of the Elector Palatine Louis V
- Sidonie of Poděbrady (1449–1510), daughter of the King of Bohemia
- Sidonie of Saxony (1518–1575), Duchess of Brunswick-Lüneburg and Princess of Calenberg-Göttingen
- Sidonia von Borcke (1548–1620), Pomeranian noblewoman tried and executed for witchcraft
- Sidonie Dumas (born 1967), French film producer
- Sidonia Făgărășan, Romanian biological scientist
- Sidonie Goossens (1899–2004), English harpist
- Sidonie Grünwald-Zerkowitz (1852–1907), Austro-Hungarian writer, translator and fashion designer
- Sidonia Jędrzejewska (born 1975), Polish politician and Member of the European Parliament
- Sidonia Hedwig Zäunemann (1711–1740), German poet

== Fictional characters ==
- Sidonia, a legendary Jewish priest's daughter - see Abiathar and Sidonia
- Sidonia of Brittany, heroine of the medieval roman Pontus and Sidonia
- Sidonie, in the 1874 French novel Fromont and Risler, also titled Sidonie
- Sidonie, in the 1686 opera Armide by Jean-Baptiste Lully
- Sidonie, in the 1777 opera Armide by Christoph Willibald Gluck, using the libretto of the earlier opera
- Sidonia, in Benjamin D'Israeli's novel Coningsby
- Tante Sidonia, in Willy Vandersteen's comics series Spike and Suzy
- Sidonia, heroine of Radclyffe Hall's novel A Saturday Life
- Sidonie, a key character in the films The Bitter Tears of Petra von Kant (Germany, 1972) and Peter Von Kant (France, 2022).
- Sidonie "Sid" Baker, an MI5 field operative assigned to Slough House in Mick Herron's novel series.

== See also ==
- Sidonius (disambiguation)
- Sidonie-Gabrielle Colette (1873–1954), French novelist and performer
