= Alexandru Roșca =

Alexandru Roșca may refer to:

- Alexandru Roșca (psychologist)
- Alexandru Roșca (footballer)
