= Ioan Stefan Florian =

Romanian neurosurgeon and academic (born 1961)

Ioan Ștefan Florian
- Born: March 24, 1961 (age 65)
- Citizenship: Romanian
- Education: Iuliu Hațieganu University of Medicine and Pharmacy
- Occupations: Neurosurgeon, academic
- Employer: Iuliu Hațieganu University of Medicine and Pharmacy
- Known for: Neurosurgery
- Title: Professor dr. MD

Ioan Ștefan Florian (born 24 March 1961) is a Romanian neurosurgeon and academi who is a professor of neurosurgery at the Iuliu Hațieganu University of Medicine and Pharmacy in Cluj-Napoca and Head of the Clinical Neurosurgery Department at the Cluj County Emergency Clinical Hospital. In 2017, Florian was elected Vice-President for Eastern Europe of the World Federation of Neurosurgical Societies (WFNS). In 2025, he served as President of the Romanian Society of Neurosurgery. His editorial work includes a specialist volume in neurosurgery published by Springer.

== Education ==
Ioan Florian was born on 24 March 1961. He graduated from the Iuliu Hațieganu Institute of Medicine and Pharmacy in Cluj-Napoca in 1986. In 2001, he received a PhD in medicine from the Iuliu Hațieganu University of Medicine and Pharmacy with a dissertation on the neurosurgical treatment of pituitary adenomas. His doctoral research was later published as the monograph Tratamentul neurochirurgical al adenoamelor hipofizare ("Neurosurgical Treatment of Pituitary Adenomas") in 2007.

== Career ==
Florian has led the Department of Neurosurgery at the Iuliu Hațieganu University of Medicine and Pharmacy. At the Cluj County Emergency Clinical Hospital, he has served as senior consultant neurosurgeon, professor, and Head of the Clinical Neurosurgery Department. His clinical activity includes over 17,600 surgical procedures. His areas of expertise include neuro-oncology, neurovascular disorders, pediatric neurosurgery, and skull base surgery. Between 2006 and 2012, Florian served as Vice-Dean of the Iuliu Hațieganu University of Medicine and Pharmacy, and from 2012 to 2020 he was President of the University Senate. He became a member of the Romanian Academy of Medical Sciences in 2008 and a full member in 2022.

== Research ==
In 2020, Florian co-edited Pineal Region Lesions: Management Strategies and Controversial Issues with Alexandru Vlad Ciurea and Frank A. Acosta, published by Springer. The volume addresses pineal region lesions from anatomical, pathological, imaging, and therapeutic perspectives.

Florian also coordinated, together with Ion Poeată, the neurosurgery volume of Tratat de chirurgie ("Treatise of Surgery"), second edition, published by the Romanian Academy Publishing House in 2014.

== Professional associations ==
In 2017, Florian was elected to the leadership of the World Federation of Neurosurgical Societies during the organization's congress in Istanbul, serving as Vice-President for Eastern Europe. The same year, he was listed among the federation's officers under the title "2nd Vice-President (at large-East Europe)". He has held several positions within the Romanian Society of Neurosurgery, including president and vice-president. He has also been involved in international professional organizations such as the WFNS, Euroacademia Multidisciplinaria Neurotraumatologica, and the Southeast European Neurosurgical Society.

== Awards and honours ==
- Order of Sanitary Merit, rank of Commander (2004)
- "Ion Chiricuță" Prize of the Iuliu Hațieganu University of Medicine and Pharmacy (2007)
- "Carol Davila" Prize for Medical Sciences (2011)
- "Surgeon of the Year" Award (2012)
- "Excellence in Healthcare" Award (2015)
- "Iuliu Hațieganu" Grand Prize (2018)
