= Sidonius =

Sidonius is a Roman cognomen literally meaning "man from Sidon" Later it was used as a given name, after the saint Sidonius Apollinaris.

Notable people with this name include:

- Sidonius of Aix (1st Century), protobishop of Augusta Tricastinorum, saint and reputed witness of Jesus' ministry
- Sidonius Apollinaris (c. 430 – c. 489), Gallo-Roman poet, diplomat, bishop and saint
- Sidonius (Irish saint) (c. 620 – c. 690)
- Sidonius, Bishop of Passau (fl. 754–764)

== See also ==
- Sidonia
