= Nicolae Mărgineanu (psychologist) =

Romanian psychologist (1905–1980)

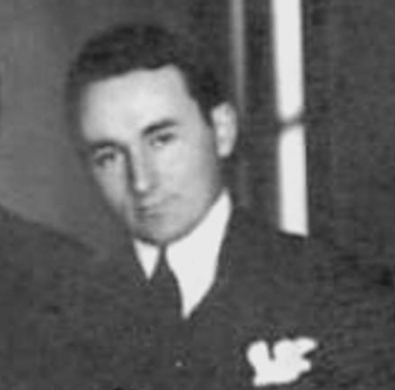
- Mărgineanu, c. 1928
- Born: June 22, 1905; Obreja, Alsó-Fehér County, Austria-Hungary
- Died: June 13, 1980 (aged 74); Cluj-Napoca, Socialist Republic of Romania
- Education: University of Cluj
- Children: Dana Țăranu Mărgineanu; Nicolae Mărgineanu
- Scientific career
- Fields: Psychology
- Workplaces: University of Cluj
- Thesis: (1929)
- Website: margineanu.ro

Nicolae Mărgineanu (June 22, 1905 – June 13, 1980) was a Romanian psychologist. In his publications, he incorporated concepts from philosophy, literature, science and logic. A key work, Psihologia persoanei (1940), focuses on the uniqueness of the individual and his development.

== Early life and education ==
He was born on June 22, 1905 in Obreja, Alsó-Fehér County (now in Alba County), in the Transylvania region of Austria-Hungary. Mărgineanu attended high school in nearby Blaj and in Orăștie. He graduated from the psychology faculty of the University of Cluj in 1927, followed by a doctorate in 1929. In 1931 he became a docent of psychology. He attended training in Leipzig, Berlin, and Hamburg (1929), at the Sorbonne (1935) and in London (1935). He obtained a Rockefeller Foundation fellowship (the first Romanian to hold such a fellowship), which allowed him to conduct research at Harvard, Yale, Columbia, Chicago, and Duke Universities (1932–1934). He was instructor (1926–1928), teaching assistant (1928–1936), head of research at the Cluj Psychology Institute (1936–1938), and associate professor (1938–1947). From 1938 to 1942, he was substitute professor of psychology and director of the institute. In 1941–1943 he headed the psycho-technical laboratory in Cluj, under temporary Hungarian administration.

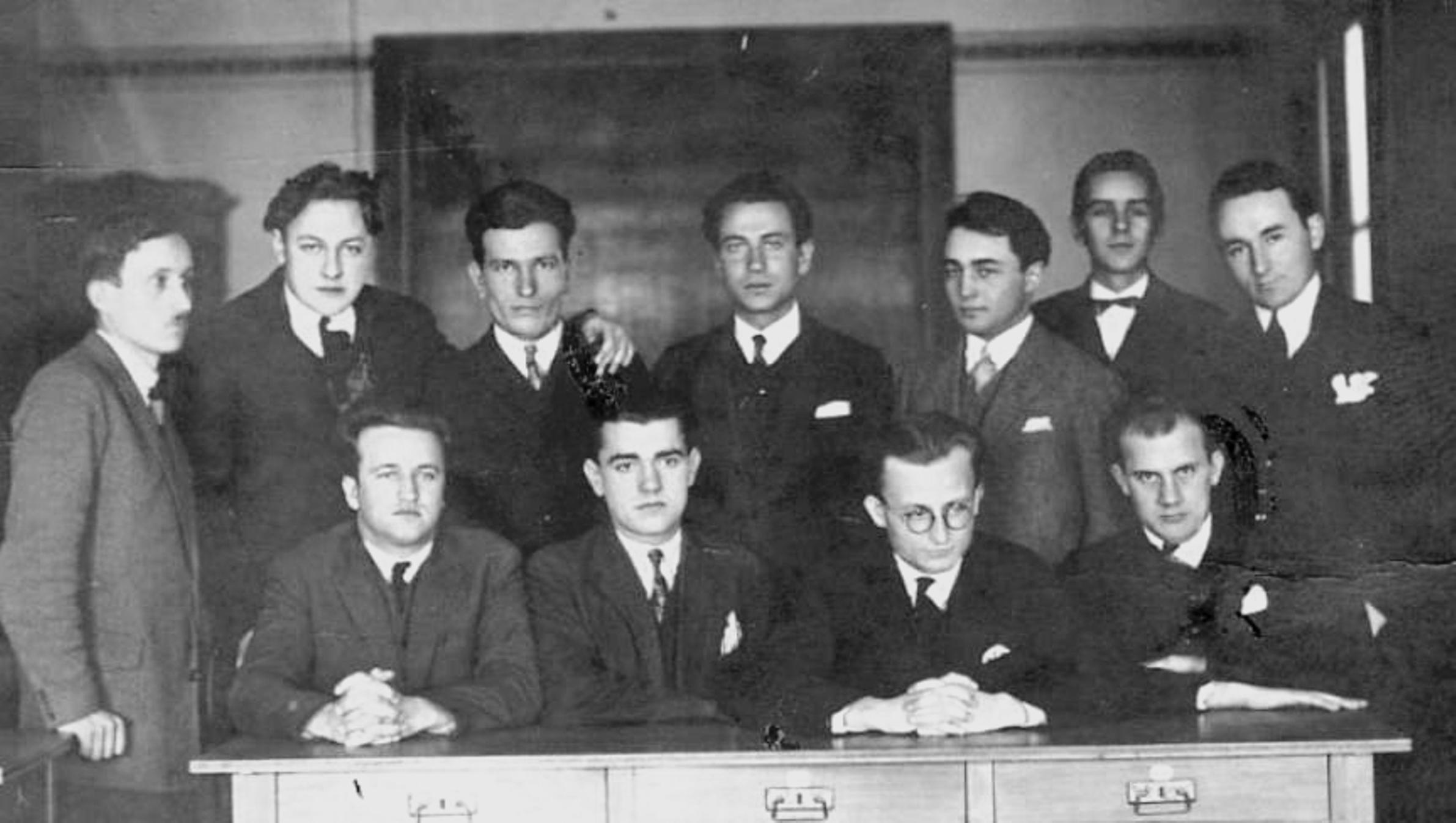
Mărgineanu (standing, to the right), with Alexandru Roșca, Salvator Cupcea, Lucian Bologa, Liviu Rusu, Teodor Bugnariu and various others, at the Psychology Institute, c. 1928

Towards the end of World War II, being close to the United States consul Burton Y. Berry, he militated for the retrocession of Northern Transylvania (ceded by Romania to Hungary in 1940 as a result of the Second Vienna Award). When Petru Groza became Prime Minister in March 1945, Mărgineanu was offered the post of Romanian ambassador to the United States, but he turned down the offer. Between 1945 and 1947, he was the vice-president of the Romanian-American Friendship Association and gave lectures praising the United States as a bastion of democracy and praising its contributions to the defeat of the Axis powers, at a time when many intellectuals joined ARLUS (the Romanian Association for Strengthening Ties with the USSR). Following a denunciation by a colleague from the University of Cluj, he was arrested on March 26, 1948 and accused of espionage and treason, based on his alleged membership in an anti-communist resistance movement. After an investigation that lasted for half a year, during which time he was beaten and tortured by the Securitate, he was sentenced to twenty-five years of forced labor by the new communist regime. Mărgineanu served sixteen years (1948–1964), being incarcerated at the notorious Văcărești, Jilava, Gherla, Dej, Pitești, and Aiud prisons. In December 1951, together with Mircea Vulcănescu (who was detained with him at Aiud), he planned a mass escape of the prisoners, so that, once they were free, they would contact the anti-communist resistance in the mountains. However, not all the detainees agreed, and in the end only three of them (aviators Tudor Greceanu and Gheorghe Spulbatu, and journalist Valeriu Șirianu) managed to escape. After being liberated in 1964, he returned to work, but was not fully rehabilitated. From 1969 to 1971, he was a researcher at the Institute of Pedagogical Sciences. Until his death, Mărgineanu was a substitute professor of psychology at what was now Babeș-Bolyai University. He was an invited professor at the Universities of Bonn (1971) and Hamburg (1972), and again a Rockefeller invitee in the United States (1979–1980). While in the US, he was diagnosed with cancer; he returned home and died in Cluj-Napoca on June 13, 1980.

He had two children: a daughter, Oana, and a son, also called Nicolae Mărgineanu, who is a film director. In 2012, he was posthumously elected a member of the Romanian Academy. A street in Cluj-Napoca is named after him.
