= Panticeu =

- Commune
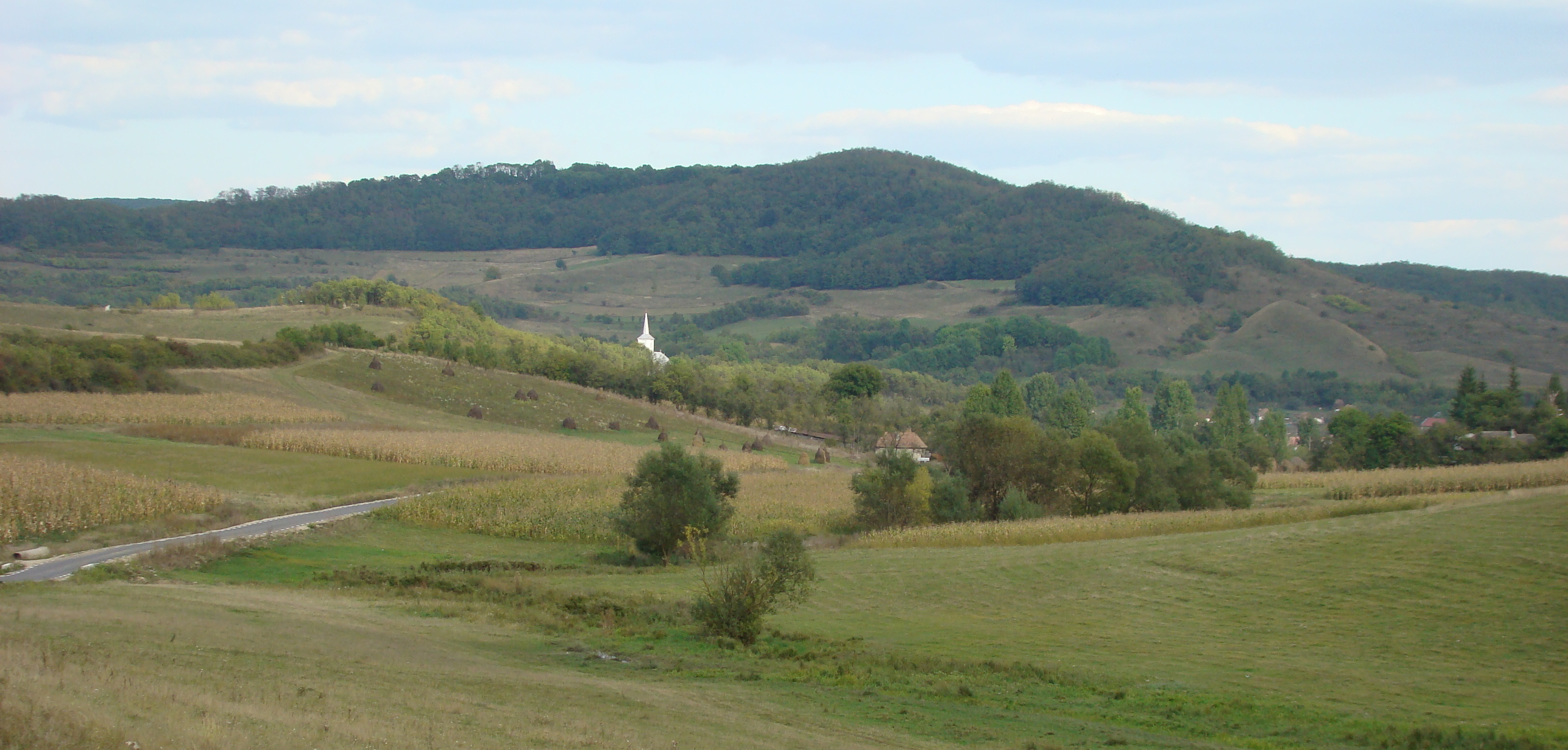
- Road from Panticeu to Cubleșu Someșan

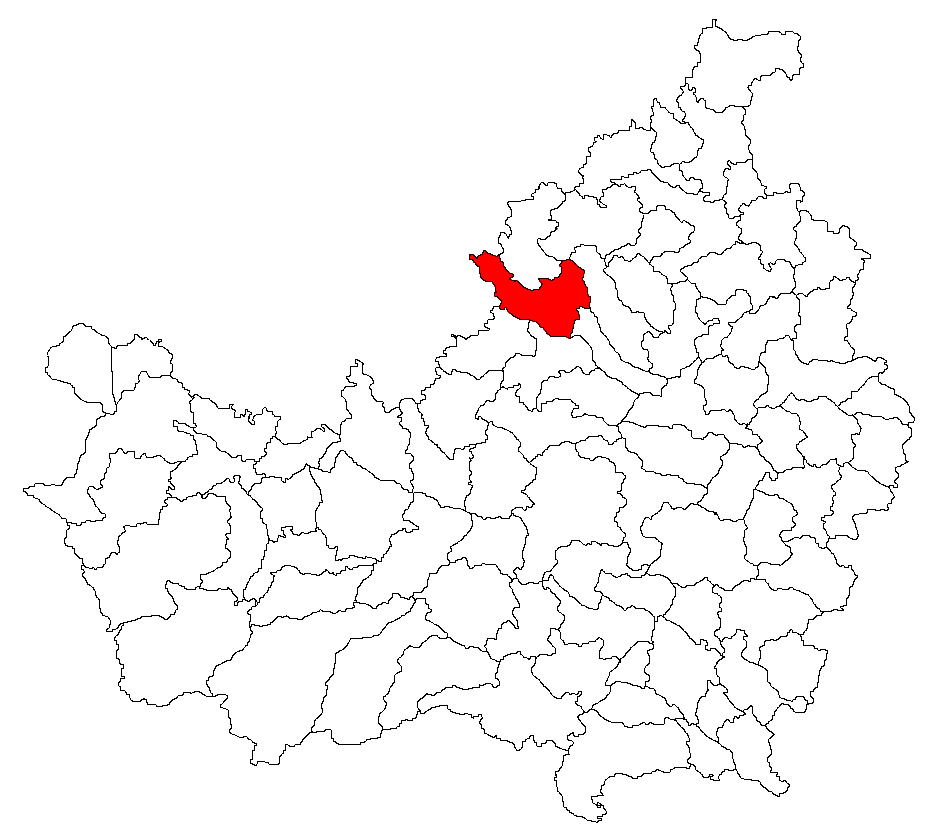
- Location in Cluj County

- Location in Romania
- Coordinates: 47°2′39″N 23°33′31″E
- Country: Romania
- County: Cluj
- Subdivisions: Cătălina, Cubleșu Someșan, Dârja, Panticeu, Sărata

Government
  - Mayor (2020–2024): Răzvan Butuza (USR PLUS)
- Area: 90.3 km^{2} (34.9 sq mi)
- Elevation: 370 m (1,210 ft)
- Population (2021-12-01): 1,717
  - Density: 19.0/km^{2} (49.2/sq mi)
- Time zone: UTC+02:00 (EET)
  - Summer (DST): UTC+03:00 (EEST)
- Postal code: 407445
- Area code: +(40) 264
- Vehicle reg.: CJ
- Website: www.primaria-panticeu.ro

Panticeu (Hungarian: Páncélcseh; German: Böhmischhofen) is a commune in the northern part of Cluj County, Transylvania, Romania. It is composed of five villages: Cătălina (Szentkatolnadorna), Cubleșu Someșan (Magyarköblös), Dârja (Magyarderzse), Panticeu, and Sărata (Szótelke).

== Demographics ==
According to the census from 2002 there was a total population of 2,001 people living in this commune, of which 85.25% were ethnic Romanians, 10.49% ethnic Roma, and 4.19% Hungarians. At the 2011 census, there were 1,844 inhabitants; of those, 77.01% were Romanians, 13.12% Roma, and 3.69% Hungarians. At the 2021 census, Panticeu had a population of 1,717, including 72.57% Romanians, 17.12% Roma, and 2.15% Hungarians.

== Natives ==
- Iuliu Hațieganu (1885 – 1959), internist doctor and member of the Romanian Academy
