= Laura Poantă =

Romanian physician, writer and artist

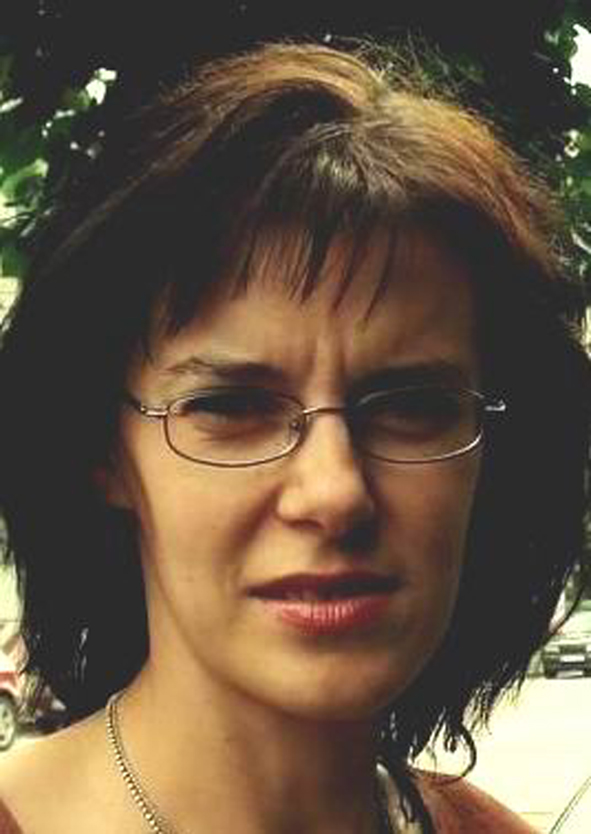
- Poantă in 2012
- Born: March 10, 1971 (age 55); Agnita, Sibiu County, Romania
- Education: Iuliu Hațieganu University of Medicine and Pharmacy
- Occupations: physician, translator, painter
- Writing career
- Period: since 1999
- Medical career
- Profession: Professor
- Field: Internal medicine
- Institutions: Iuliu Hațieganu University of Medicine and Pharmacy

Laura Poantă (born March 10, 1971) is a Romanian physician, medical scientist, author, translator, and painter.

== Education and career ==
She was born Agnita, Sibiu County, the daughter of writers Petru Poantă and Irina Petraș. She graduated from the “Romul Ladea” Fine Arts College in Cluj-Napoca in 1989, with a degree in drawing, graphic design and decoration, and next, from the Iuliu Hațieganu University of Medicine and Pharmacy also in Cluj-Napoca, with a licence in general medicine (1995). In 2002 she became an instructor, then lecturer (in 2009) at the Iuliu Hațieganu University of Medicine and Pharmacy, and since 2004/2005, PhD and senior internal medicine physician. Since 2010, she has been the president of the Doctor – Artists Society of Cluj.

== Publishing activity ==
She debuted in 1999, with a translation from Italian into Romanian of Lift, by Edmondo de Amicis, and with the medical volume Abecedarul vieții sexuale/ABC of sexual life. She also translated, from English and Italian to Romanian, works of Oscar Wilde, Edgar Allan Poe, Katherine Mansfield, Mark Twain, Luigi Pirandello, and David Greig. She collaborated to the magazines Viața medicală, Ziarul financiar, Clujul medical, Revista română de bioetică, Romanian Journal of Internal Medicine, European Journal of Internal Medicine, Acta Diabetologica, Medical Ultrasonography, Medical Update, and other publications. She realized the presentation of the art reproduction on the cover of JAMA (Romanian painting) in four consecutive issues, and many other book covers. She edited and devised, between 2007 and 2012, the Physician Winter Exhibition’s catalogues, dedicated to the works of artist physicians, organized within the UMF “Iuliu Hatieganu” Days, that are in her custody since 2008. She is peer reviewer for European Journal of Internal Medicine and Dove Press journals. She wrote in collective volumes, published by Writers Union – Cluj Department: Cartea mea fermecată / My charmed book (2009), Invitaţie la vers / Invitation to rhyme (2010), Varză à la Cluj / Cabbage à la Cluj (2010), Promenada scriitorilor / Writers promenade (2012), Marea scriitorilor. De la Olimp la zidul puterii / Writers’ Sea. From Olymp to Power’s Wall (2012).

== Art work ==
Poantă has been present in a considerable number of solo exhibitions (University Library Lucian Blaga), in the paintings salons of physicians in Cluj, on the covers of over 150 volumes published by editors such as Dacia, Libra, House Science books, Pallas Athena, Clusium, The Didactic and Pedagogical Publishing House etc.

== Works ==
=== Translations from world literature (written in English and Italian) into Romanian ===
- Edmondo De Amicis, Lift / Lift, Bilingual collection Bufnița, Pitești, Editura Paralela 45, 1999 (reprinted in 2008, 2010, 2011, 2012);
- Oscar Wilde, The Happy Prince / Prințul fericit; The Devoted Friend / Prietenul cel bun, Bilingual collection Bufnița, Pitești, Editura Paralela 45, 2003 (reprinted in 2008, 2010, 2011, 2014);
- Edgar Allan Poe, Ms. Found in A Bottle / Manuscris găsit într-o sticlă; The Tell-tale Heart / Inima povestitoare, Bilingual collection Bufnița, Pitești, Editura Paralela 45, 2003 (reprinted in 2009, 2011);
- Katherine Mansfield, The Fly / Musca; Bliss / Fericire, Bilingual collection Bufniţa, Pitești, Editura Paralela 45, 2003 (reprinted in 2009, 2010, 2011);
- Oscar Wilde, Poems in Prose / Poeme în proză; The Model Millionaire / Milionarul model; The Selfish Giant / Uriașul cel egoist, Bilingual collection Bufnița, Pitești, Editura Paralela 45, 2004 (reprinted in 2007, 2009);
- Oscar Wilde, The Canterville Ghost/Fantoma din Canterville, Bilingual collection Bufnița, Pitești, Editura Paralela 45, 2004 (reprinted in 2009, 2010, 2011);
- Saki, The Seven Cream Jugs and Other Short Stories / Cele șapte boluri pentru frișcă și alte povestiri, Bilingual collection Bufnița, Pitești, Editura Paralela 45, 2005 (reprinted in 2009, 2011);
- Mark Twain, How To Tell A Story / Cum să spui o poveste; Luck / Noroc, Bilingual collection Bufnița, Pitești, Editura Paralela 45, 2005 (reprinted in 2009, 2010, 2011);
- Luigi Pirandello, Rău de lună și alte povestiri, Cluj-Napoca, Casa Cărții de Știință, 2009;
- David Greig, Ultimul mesaj al cosmonautului către femeia pe care a iubit-o cândva în fosta Uniune Sovietică, a play translated for the National Theatre “Lucian Blaga” from Cluj-Napoca, premiere: October 2010 (director: Radu Afrim);
- Gerald Graff, Cathy Birkenstein, Manual de scriere academică. Ei spun /eu spun, Pitești, Editura Paralela 45, 2015;
- Patrick Skene Catling, Povestea băiatului care transformă în ciocolată tot ce atinge, Pitești, Editura Paralela 45, 2016;
- Anne Fine, Întoarcerea pisicii asasine, 2016; Rochia lui Bill, Editura Paralela 45, 2016;
- Mary Pope Osborne, Portalul magic, patru povestiri, Editura Paralela 45, 2017.

=== Volumes of specialized studies (in the field of medicine) ===
- Abecedarul vieții sexuale, Cluj-Napoca, Casa Cărții de Știință, 1999;
- Abecedarul sănătății, Cluj-Napoca, Casa Cărții de Știință, 2001;
- Actualități în patologia biochimică a bolilor cardiovasculare, Mircea Cucuianu, Dumitru Zdrenghea (Eds.), Cluj-Napoca, Casa Cărții de Știință, 2004 (co-author);
- Stresul profesional și riscul cardiovascular la muncitorii feroviari, in collaboration with D. Zdrenghea, Cluj-Napoca, Casa Cărții de Știință, 2005;
- Mic dicționar etimologic de termeni medicali, Cluj-Napoca, Casa Cărții de Știință, 2005;
- Electrocardiografie. Cazuri clinice, Cluj-Napoca, Casa Cărții de Știință, 2006; second edition, 2008; third edition, 2010 (co-author);
- Semiologie medicală în 100 de imagini, Cluj-Napoca, Casa Cărții de Știință, 2007 (co-author);
- Medicii și stresul ocupațional, Cluj-Napoca, Casa Cărții de Știință, 2007;
- Recuperare și prevenție cardiovasculară, Cluj-Napoca, Clusium, 2008 (co-author);
- Termeni medicali cu nume propriu. Dicționar de semne, simptome, sindroame, Cluj-Napoca, Casa Cărții de Știință, 2008;
- Viața sexuală. Mic dicționar de termeni medicali, Cluj-Napoca, Casa Cărții de Știință, 2009;
- Tulburările funcționale intestinale, Dan L. Dumitrașcu (Eds.), Cluj-Napoca, Casa Cărții de Știință, 2009 (co-author);
- Scenarii clinice. Cardiologie, Cluj-Napoca, Casa Cărții de Știință, 2012 (co-author);
- Semiologie. Teste, quizuri, scenarii, Cluj-Napoca, Editura Școala Ardeleană, 2015 (co-author);
- Termeni medicali. Semne, simptome, sindroame cu nume propriu. Mic dicționar etimologic, Editura Școala Ardeleană, 2017.
- Stresul, boala mileniului trei?, Editura Școala Ardeleană, 2021;
- Doctorul de povești. medicină și literatură, 2021
- Omniscop. Medicină și societate, 2023

== Exhibitions of graphics (personal and collective) ==
- Central University Library “Lucian Blaga”, Cluj-Napoca;
- The Physicians Winter Salon, National Art Museum of Cluj-Napoca;
- The Spring Salon of the Writers.

== Affiliations ==
- Member of The Writers’ Union of Romania
- Member of Societății Române de Medicină Internă; a Societății Române de Semiologie; American Society of Echocardiography; American Psychosomatic Society; European Association of Echocardiography
