= Gheorghe Benga =

Romanian physician and molecular biologist

Gheorghe Benga (born January 26, 1944, in Timișoara, Romania) is a Romanian physician and molecular biologist. He is professor and chairman in the Department of Cell and Molecular Biology of the Iuliu Hațieganu University of Medicine and Pharmacy in Cluj-Napoca, Romania, and a titular member of the Romanian Academy.

== Biography ==
Benga did his studies in Cluj-Napoca, earning an M.D. from the University of Medicine and Pharmacy in 1967, and an M.Sc. in Chemistry from Babeș-Bolyai University in 1973.

In 1986, together with collaborators Octavian Popescu and Victor I. Pop, Benga showed the existence of a protein water channel in the red blood cell membrane. Two years later, in 1988, Peter Agre independently isolated the protein and demonstrated it was a ubiquitously expressed water transport protein, naming it aquaporin. In 2003 Agre would receive the Nobel Prize in Chemistry for his work. Benga and his collaborators would appeal this award before the Nobel Committee, to no avail, though he would receive recognition with a Gold Medal at the Third Science Congress held in Constanța.
