= Academic College (Cluj-Napoca) =

Coordinates: 46°46′04″N 23°35′33″E

- Colegiul Academic
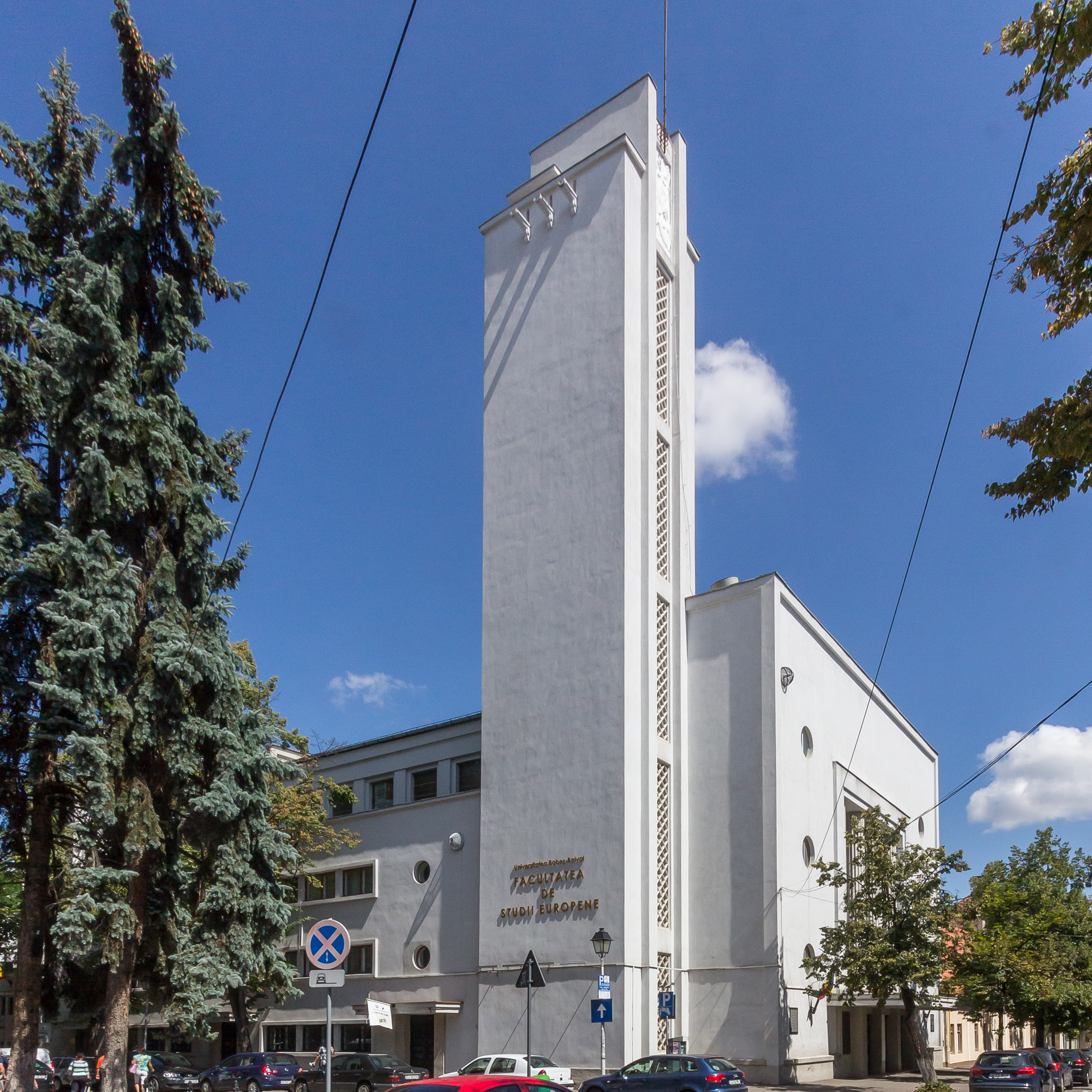
- Front view
- Interactive map of the Academic College area

General information
- Architectural style: Art Deco
- Location: Strada Emmanuel de Martonne, Nr. 1 Cluj-Napoca, Romania
- Construction started: 1934
- Completed: 1937

Design and construction
- Architect: George Cristinel

Other information
- Seating capacity: Auditorium Maximum: 854 seats Small Hall: 300 seats

The Academic College (Romanian: Colegiul Academic) is an Art Deco building in Cluj-Napoca, Romania, belonging to Babeș-Bolyai University and located at 1 Emmanuel de Martonne Street.

== History ==
Soon after the 1918 union of Transylvania with Romania and the subsequent establishment of a Romanian-language university in Cluj, the idea of a building for use by teaching staff came into being. The planned site were the land and building occupied by the old Hungarian theatre, which was in an advanced state of degradation and had come under the university's ownership. In 1926, upon the suggestion of Emil Racoviță, the university senate discussed the matter, hiring an architect who drew up plans and a cost estimate. With total expenditures coming to some 24 million lei, beyond the university's possibilities at the time, the project was temporarily dropped. In 1932, the university's new rector, Florian Ștefănescu-Goangă, revived the idea. Due to his prestige and political connections, he was able to persuade Prime Minister Gheorghe Tătărescu to come to Cluj. At a joint session of the Romanian Cabinet and the university senate held in May 1934, the university obtained a commitment for 44 million lei from the government, to cover the planned building and improvements to extant facilities. The rector had three main purposes in mind for the college: as a place where Cluj university professors could meet professors from other Romanian cities and abroad, scientists from other institutions and students; as a place for organizing university events and cultural performances; as a place for students to meet and hold activities pertaining to student life, such as student societies, a cafeteria and dances.

Construction began in the autumn of 1934, following demolition of the old theatre. Under the supervision of a Bucharest architect, building lasted until November 1936, with the cost reaching 30 million lei. The college was inaugurated in June 1937, in the presence of King Carol II, cabinet members and other local and national officials. On this occasion, the king was conferred an honorary doctorate, and the building was styled "Carol II Academic College". The new building had a large, 1000-seat auditorium for conferences, balls and concerts; a small auditorium with 300 seats; a cafeteria that could fit 500; offices for student societies, rooms for housing foreign visitors, and a recreation area for professors with a conference room, a library and a billiard table. Between 1940 and 1945, as a result of the Second Vienna Award's grant of Northern Transylvania to Hungary, it was named after Matthias Corvinus. Under the communist regime, it was called Casa Universitarilor ("University House"), regaining its old name in the 2000s.

The building is listed as a historic monument by Romania's Culture Ministry. In 2014, a memorial plaque was unveiled on the college, featuring the names of King Carol, Tătărescu and Ștefănescu-Goangă.

== Gallery ==
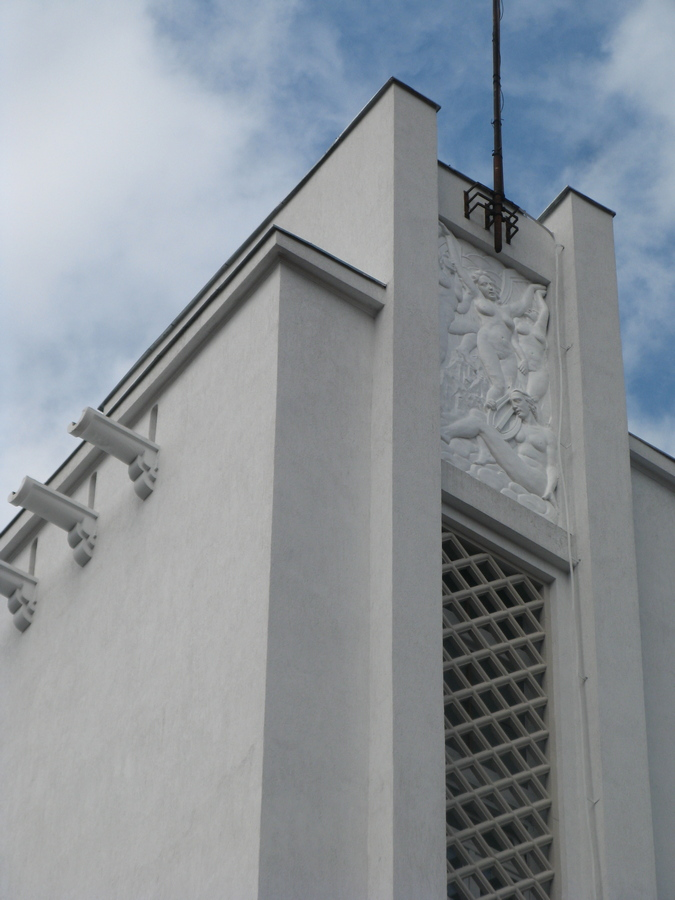
Detail on the tower of the Academic College.

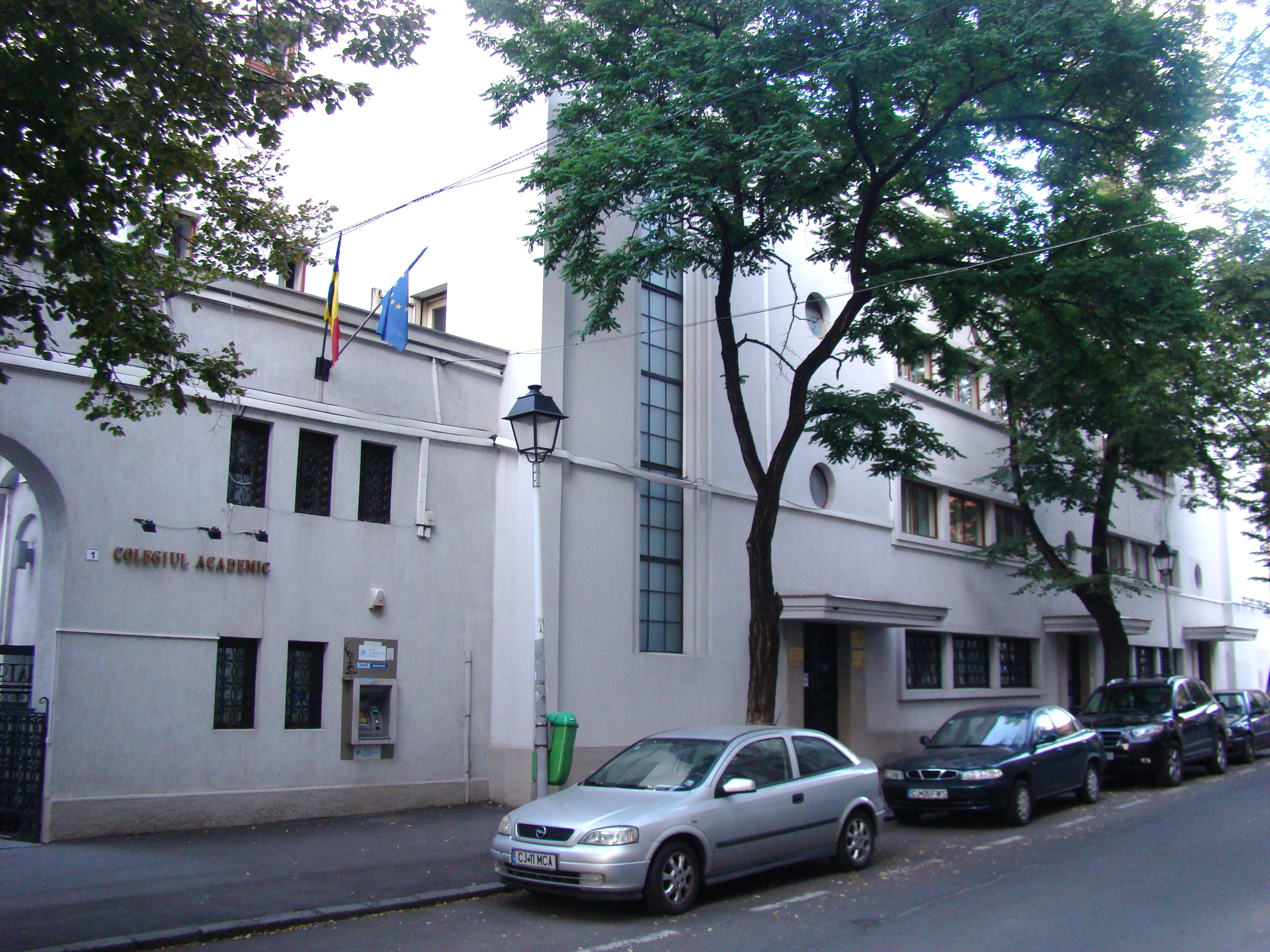
Side of the building.

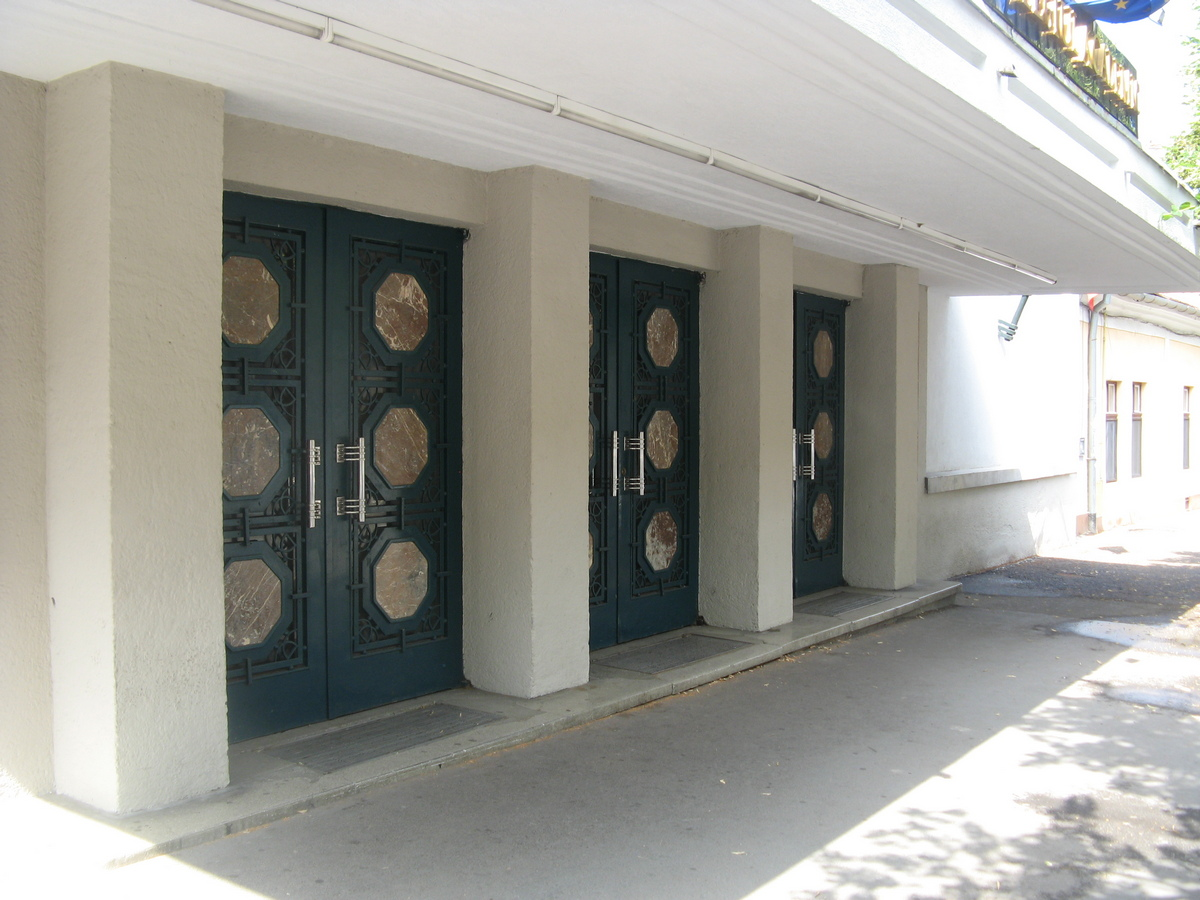
Detailed doors on the front entrance of the Academic College.

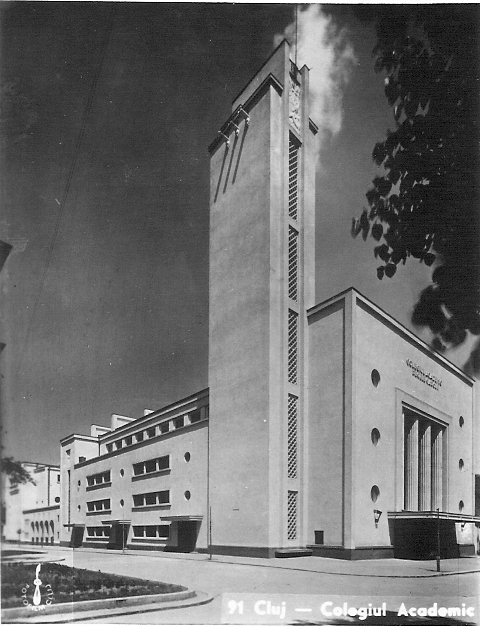
Academic College in 1939.
