= Sergiu P. Pașca =

Romanian-American scientist

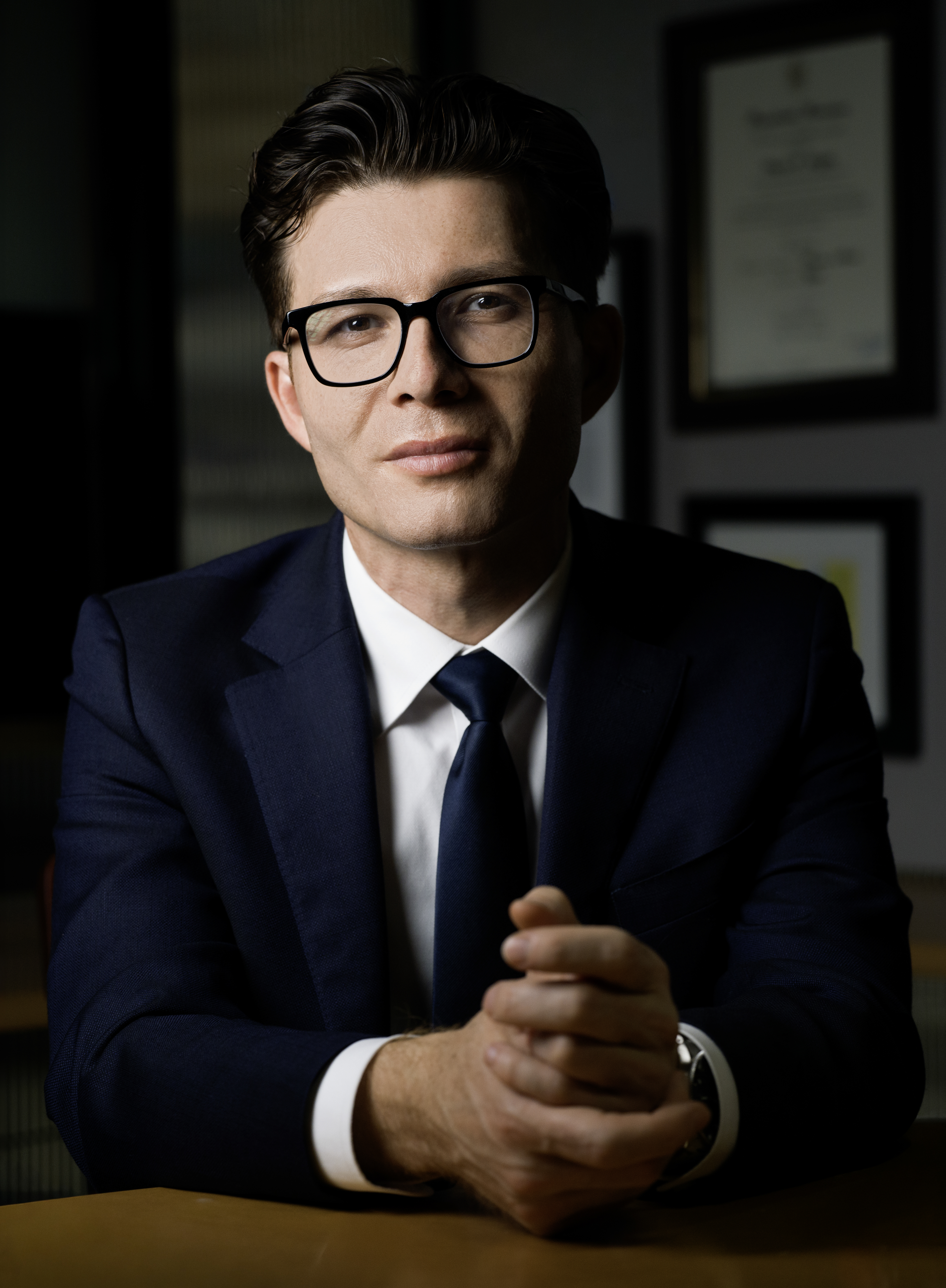
- Pașca in 2025
- Born: January 30, 1982 (age 44); Cluj-Napoca, Romania
- Education: Iuliu Hațieganu University of Medicine and Pharmacy
- Scientific career
- Fields: Neuroscience, Biology, Stem Cell
- Workplaces: Stanford University, Hoover Institution
- Academic advisors: Ricardo Dolmetsch
- Website: www.med.stanford.edu/pascalab.html

Sergiu P. Pașca (born January 30, 1982) is a Romanian-American scientist and physician at Stanford University in California. He is renowned for his groundbreaking work creating and applying stem cell-based models of the human brain to gain insights into neuropsychiatric disease. Pașca's work has helped establish human neural organoids and assembloids as experimental platforms for studying human brain development, circuit assembly, and disease mechanisms, and for enabling therapeutic discovery directly in human cellular systems.

== Overview ==
Pașca is a neuroscientist and stem cell biologist. He holds the Kenneth T. Norris Endowed Professorship in Psychiatry and Behavioral Sciences at Stanford University. He is a Senior Fellow at the Hoover Institution. He founded and leads the Stanford Brain Organogenesis Program as the Bonnie Uytengsu and Family Founding Director. He is a member of the Stanford Neurosciences Institute, Stanford Bio-X and he is a fellow of the ChEM-H Institute at Stanford. Through this work, Pașca has contributed to the emergence of human stem cell–based circuit neuroscience and to the use of human cellular systems for therapeutic discovery in neuropsychiatric disease.

His lab was the first to develop and name assembloids: multi-unit self-organizing structures created in 3D cultures that allow for the study of human neural circuit and systems functions in vitro. Pașca's lab generated and published human cortico-striatal and cortico-motor assembloids in 2020. Combining regionalized neural organoids pioneered in the lab and studies with human forebrain assembloids and transplantation, in 2024, Pașca developed a therapeutic for a severe genetic disorder called Timothy Syndrome, which was published on the cover of Nature.

Pașca was listed among New York Times Visionaries in Medicine and Sciences, he is the recipient of the 2018 Vilcek Award for Creative Biomedical Promise from the Vlicek Foundation, and the 2022 IBRO-Kemali Neuroscience Prize, and he holds a Doctor Honoris Causa. In 2022, he gave a TED talk on reverse engineering the human brain in the laboratory and in 2023 he became a Knight of the Order of Merit of Romania.

== Early life and education ==
Pașca was born in Cluj-Napoca, in the region of Transylvania in Romania. He was raised in a modest family nearby Aiud. Pașca showed early on an interest in chemistry. He set up his first science lab at the age of 11, in the basement of his parents' house. In the final year of high school, he won a prize in the national chemistry Olympiad, earning a scholarship to attend the university of his choice in Romania. In 2001, Pașca enrolled in the Iuliu Hațieganu University of Medicine and Pharmacy at Cluj-Napoca, being the first in his family to attend college. As a medical student, he worked with Professor Maria Dronca to explore biochemical defects in autism spectrum disorders. At the same time, he studied electrophysiology at the Max Planck Institute for Brain Research in Frankfurt in Germany under Dr Danko Nikolic. After obtaining his M.D. in 2007, Pașca went to Stanford University in early 2009 as a postdoctoral fellow with Professor Ricardo Dolmetsch. At Stanford, he developed methods to derive neurons from induced pluripotent stem cells (iPSC) and used these neural cultures to identify cellular phenotypes associated with brain disorders, including Timothy syndrome and Dravet syndrome.

In 2014, he was recruited as a tenure-track Assistant Professor at Stanford University and opened his own laboratory. He became a tenured Associate Professor in 2020 and full Professor in 2022. He was soon after named an Endowed Professor at Stanford University. In 2023, he received a Doctor Honoris Causa (D.H.C.) from Iuliu Hatieganu Medical School in Cluj-Napoca, Romania.

His personal trajectory was described in a Quanta profile by the American journalist Claudia Dreyfus and in a profile by Tracie White. In 2025 he was featured as a Hero of the National Academies.

== Research ==
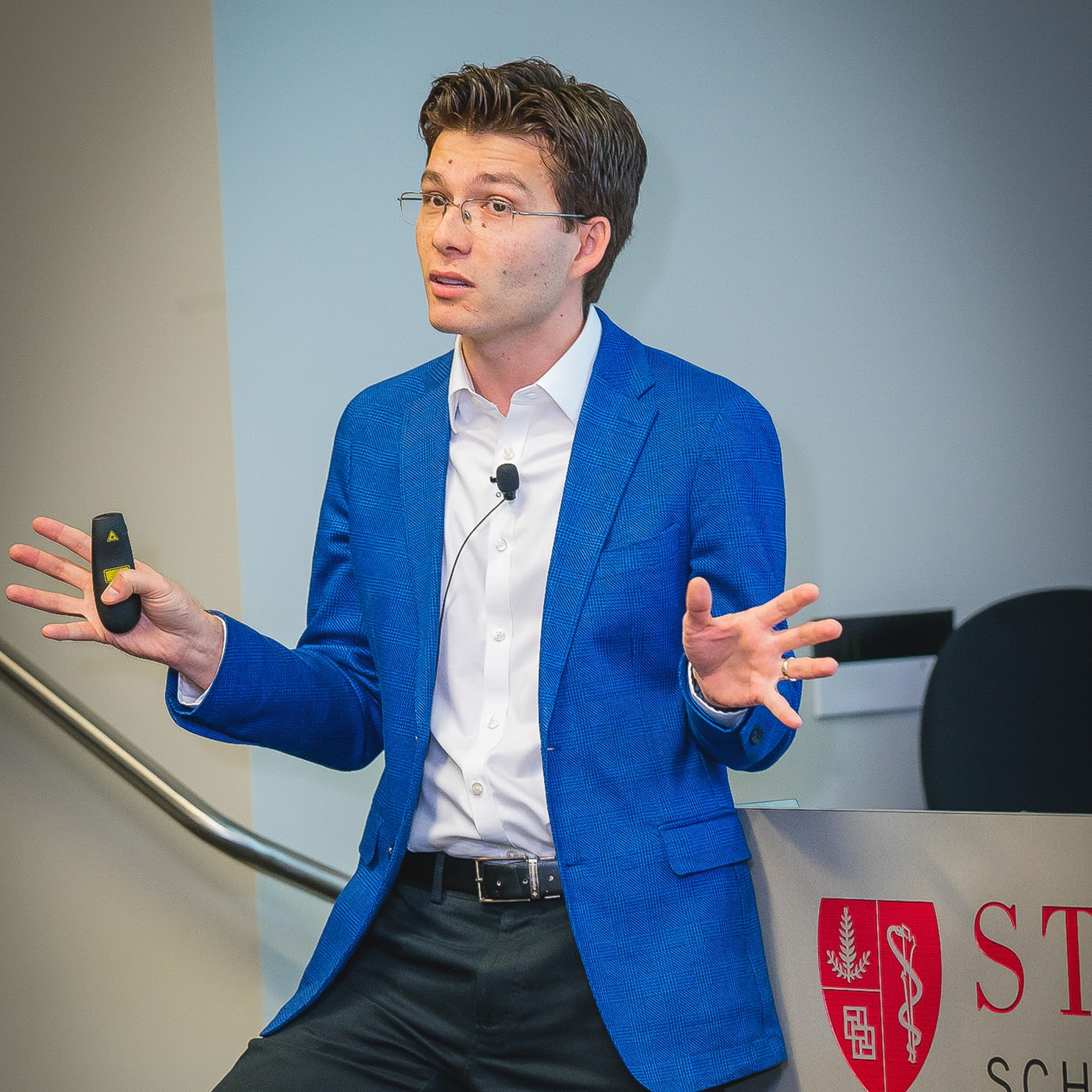
Pașca in 2018

Pașca's laboratory at Stanford University explores the biological mechanisms of neurodevelopmental disorders, such as autism spectrum disorders, epilepsy and schizophrenia, using cellular models of the human brain.

Early in his career, Pașca developed some of the first patient-specific, in vitro models of neurodevelopmental disease by deriving neurons from skin cells obtained from individuals with genetic forms of autism and related conditions, shortly after the introduction of human induced pluripotent stem cell technology by Shinya Yamanaka. These patient-derived neurons—initially studied in two-dimensional cultures and later in 3D neural organoids and assembloids developed in his laboratory—enabled the systematic investigation of disease-associated cellular phenotypes and developmental mechanisms. This work demonstrated the potential of human stem cell–based systems for modeling neuropsychiatric disease.

In 2024, his lab reported in a Nature cover article a therapeutic developed exclusively with human stem cell-based models.

=== Neural organoids ===
In his laboratory, Pașca introduced the use of instructive signals to develop lab-grown self-assembling 3D structures called regionalized neural spheroids or organoids. This was inspired by Yoshiki Sasai's work on self-organization in stem cell systems.Through application of various guidance molecules, Pașca's lab has developed many distinct neural organoids representing different brain areas, including the cerebral cortex, ventral forebrain, striatum, spinal cord, thalamus and others. This method was listed among the Key Advances in hiPSC Disease Modeling of the Last Decade by the journal Cell Stem Cell, and Organoids were named Methods of the Year in 2017 by Nature Methods. These 3D brain tissue resemble specific regions of the nervous system and he has now developed protocols to reliably derive dozens of regions of the human nervous system, including using unbiased, multiplexed morphogen screens.

His laboratory demonstrated that these organoids undergo prolonged maturation over extended periods in culture, following intrinsic developmental timelines that parallel aspects of human brain development, including glial maturation. More specifically, his group maintained cultures for over 1000 days in vitro and in a series of articles demonstrated advanced cell maturation, including of astrocytes, into postnatal stages according to an intrinsic "brain clock" or "timer". His work on astrocytes was inspired by the late Stanford neurobiologist Ben Barres.

=== Assembloids ===
Pașca has demonstrated that brain-region specific organoids can be functionally integrated to form brain assembloids, which spontaneously integrate and demonstrate emergent properties. He has employed this preparation to study the cross-talk between cells in the developing human brain and to mimic human brain circuits in a dish. Pașca coined the term assembloids in 2018 referring to the first forebrain assembloids reported in early 2017. This work was listed among the Top Research Advances of 2017 by the National Institutes of Health. His lab has subsequently developed cortico-striatal and three-part cortico-spinal-muscle assembloids where muscle contraction can be triggered by stimulation of cortical neurons. By combining assembloids with CRISPR screening, Pașca lab mapped hundreds of autism-related genes to interneuron development stages, which also revealed an unknown role of the endoplasmic reticulum in migration.

In 2024, his lab reported the first four-part assembloids that model the somatosensory pathway, enabling activity monitoring of the entire circuit and response to noxious stimuli and to study genetic pain syndromes. Subsequently, his group reported the ‘loop’ assembloids to study activity in recurrent circuits of the cortico-striato-midbrian-thalamic pathways and model disease and midline assembloids to study axonal crossing.

Assembloids developed in his laboratory have been used to study neuronal migration, circuit integration, recurrent network activity, and interactions between multiple regions of the human nervous system.

The concept of assembloids has been applied to other systems and organs. Assembloids are now widely used to model complex cell-cell interactions in other systems and organs, including the gut, immune system, cancer, kidney, lung, genitourinary system. The first conference on assembloids took place at Cold Spring Harbor Laboratory (CSHL) in December 2025.

=== Transplantation of organoids ===
In 2022, his group demonstrated the successful integration of human cortical organoids into the developing rat cerebral cortex. Human neurons displayed advanced maturation in vivo, responded to whisker stimulation and were capable of influencing the behavior of the rat in a reward task.

This work was extensively covered by the press. Pașca discussed the ethical implications of his work with the ethicist Insoo Hyun in a video material filmed at the Boston Science Museum. Pașca acknowledged that organoid transplantation offers great promise for characterizing human cellular processes in vivo but encourages caution and ethical consideration in pursuing these experiments.

=== Disease modeling and translation ===
Pașca’s laboratory has used human neural cultures, organoids, and assembloids to study a range of neurodevelopmental and neuropsychiatric disorders, including Timothy syndrome, autism spectrum disorders, epilepsy, and schizophrenia.

Neurons from Timothy syndrome patients were some of the first hiPSC-derived neurons to be derived. Through iterative modeling across 2D, 3D, and transplanted systems, his group identified disease mechanisms that informed the development of a therapeutic strategy for Timothy syndrome, representing an example of therapeutic discovery driven primarily by human cellular models. This intervention– an ASO identified in a screen, biases expression away from the mutated Cav1.2 channel towards a developmentally regulated isoform.

Beyond Timothy syndrome, Pașca’s organoid and assembloid systems have exposed cellular vulnerabilities and candidate interventions in early hypoxic brain injury, 22q11.2 deletion syndrome, Phelan-McDermid syndrome, CACNA1G-related disease, LNPK encephalopathy, and sensory-pain biology, underscoring the platform’s translational potential.

=== Stanford Brain Organogenesis Center ===
In 2019, Pașca founded the Stanford Brain Organogenesis Program, which is a university wide effort to leverage technologies developed at Stanford to advance humanity's understanding of human brain development and circuit assembly. The program includes Karl Deisseroth, Zhenan Bao, Bianxiao Cui, Michael Lin, Sarah Heilshorn and Hank Greely. Pașca serves as the Bonnie Uytengsu and Family Endowed Director. The program is also broadly sharing organoid and assembloids technologies through a free, hands-on course, promoting students to travel and learn at Stanford.

=== Teaching and public engagement ===
At Stanford, Pașca teaches neural development and principles of drug discovery in neuroscience. Pașca has also been the co-director of the CSHL Workshop on autism spectrum disorders.

In 2022, he gave a TED talk at the Vancouver event describing the potential of human cellular models to understand disease.

=== Field building and dissemination ===
Pașca has contributed to multiple international, collaborative efforts aimed at establishing consensus on the nomenclature and classification of neural organoids and assembloids, defining quality and reproducibility standards, and outlining ethical considerations for research using human stem cell-based neuro-models. These initiatives helped provide a shared conceptual and methodological framework for a rapidly expanding field.

He also helped establish the primary international conference focused on human neural development and 3D brain modeling, held at CSHL and co-organized with Guo-Li Ming. The meeting serves as a central forum for researchers working on human neural development, organoids, and assembloids.

Through the Stanford Brain Organogenesis Center, Pașca has supported the broad dissemination of organoid and assembloid technologies by organizing free, hands-on training courses that attract students and researchers from around the world. Through close scientific interactions, laboratory visits, and open training initiatives, the Center has enabled hundreds of laboratories internationally to implement and adapt methods developed in his laboratory.

== Honors and awards ==
Pașca is a Chan Zuckerberg Initiative Ben Barres Investigator and a CZ BioHub Investigator. He was a New York Stem Cell Foundation Roberston Stem Cell Investigator. His researched activity gained him several awards:

- Sir Wilfrid Le Gros Clark Prize, Oxford University (2026)
- NIH Method to Extend Research Time (MERIT) Award (2025)
- Eva King Killam Research Award, American College of Neuropsychopharmacology (2024)
- Schaller Prize for Translational Neuroscience (2024)
- ISSCR Momentum Award, International Society for Stem Cell Research (2024)
- Knight of the Order of Merit, The Chancery of Orders (2023)
- Sumitomo/Sunovion Prize, International College of Neuropsychopharmacology (2023)
- Doctor Honoris Causa (D.H.C.), Hatieganu Medical School (2023)
- IBRO Dargut and Milena Kemali International Prize for Basic and Clinical Neurosciences (2022)
- Judson Daland Prize for Outstanding Achievement in Clinical Investigation, American Society of Philosophy (2021)
- Joseph Altman Award in Developmental Neuroscience (2021)
- Schizophrenia Basic Research Award (2021)
- C.J. Herrick Award in Neuroanatomy (2020)
- A.E.Bennett Award, Society of Biological Psychiatry (2018)
- Daniel H. Efron Award, American College of Neuropsychopharmacology (2018)
- Günter Blobel Award, American Society of Cell Biology (2018)
- New York Times Visionaries in Science and Medicine (2018)
- Vilcek Award for Creative Biomedical Promise (2018)
- Jordi Folch-Pi Award, American Society for Neurochemistry (2017)
- NARSAD Independent Investigator Award (2017)
- NIMH Director's BRAINS Award (2015)
- MQ Fellow Award for Transforming Mental Health (2014)
- Sammy Kuo Award (2012)
- IBRO Outstanding Research Fellow (2009)

In Romania, he was recognized as the Best Romanian student studying abroad in 2012 and was listed among Top 100 Romanians.
