= Emil Hațieganu =

Romanian politician and jurist

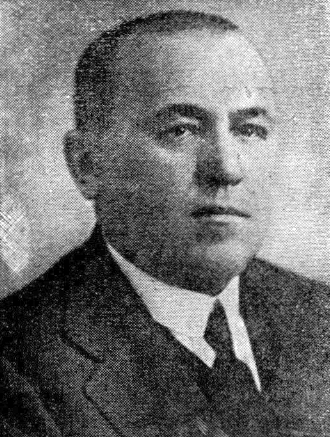

Minister of Labour, Health, and Social Security
- In office 10 October 1930 – 17 April 1931
- Prime Minister: Gheorghe Mironescu
- Preceded by: Pantelimon Halippa
- Succeeded by: Ioan Cantacuzino

Minister of State
- In office 29 April 1931 – 14 July 1931
- Prime Minister: Nicolae Iorga
- In office 6 June 1932 – 19 October 1932
- Prime Minister: Alexandru Vaida-Voevod
- In office 14 January 1933 – 13 November 1933
- Prime Minister: Alexandru Vaida-Voevod

Minister Secretary of State
- In office 7 January 1946 – 30 November 1946
- Prime Minister: Petru Groza

Personal details
- Born: December 9, 1878 Tritenii de Jos, Austria-Hungary
- Died: May 13, 1959 (aged 80) Cluj, Romanian People's Republic
- Party: Romanian National Party; National Peasants' Party
- Parent: Ioan Hațeganu (father)
- Relatives: Iuliu, Eugen, Simion, Ioan (brothers)
- Education: Franz Joseph University
- Profession: Jurist
- Awards: Honorary member of the Romanian Academy

Emil Hațieganu (December 9, 1878—May 13, 1959) was a Romanian politician and jurist, a prominent member of the Romanian National Party (PNR) and of its successor, the National Peasants' Party (PNȚ); he was physician Iuliu Hațieganu's brother. Before his arrest, he was an honorary member of the Romanian Academy.

He was born in Tritenii de Jos, Transylvania (inside the Kingdom of Hungary in Austria-Hungary at the time, now in Cluj County, Romania), the son of Ioan Hațeganu, a Greek Catholic priest. He attended gymnasium and high school in Blaj and Cluj, and then studied Law at Franz Joseph University in Cluj, graduating in 1901. Afterwards, he practiced Law and was a judge in Huedin, Ileanda, and Cluj.

Hațieganu later became a professor at the University of Cluj, and served as its rector in 1929–1930. Following World War I and the Aster Revolution in Hungary, he was present with PNR leaders at the Alba Iulia assembly that called for the union of Transylvania with Romania, and served on the Directory Council designated by the participants.

A Minister of Labour and Social Security in the Iuliu Maniu cabinets in Bucharest, he was kept in the Gheorghe Mironescu government (that brought about the return of Carol II as King of Romania). Hațieganu also held the office of Minister of State for Transylvania. In 1940, he became noted for his vocal protest against the cession of Northern Transylvania to Hungary (the signing of the Second Vienna Award).

Retreated from political life during World War II, he returned to the forefront of illegal opposition before the fall of the Ion Antonescu pro-Nazi dictatorship (see Romania during World War II). After the start of Soviet military occupation in Romania, Hațieganu held the position of PNȚ Minister without Portfolio in the first Petru Groza Romanian Communist Party-dominated cabinet; his appointment, like that of the National Liberal Mihail Romniceanu, followed pressures on Groza to open executive structures to politicians from outside the Communist-led National Democratic Front alliance — both mandates were ended by the 1946 general election.

In front of mounting Communist influence, Hațieganu approached Iuliu Maniu with a proposal to establish direct contacts with the Western Allies by having Ion Mihalache evade the country (July 1947); the attempt, known as the Tămădău Affair, eventually led to the prosecution of the PNȚ leadership during a show trial and to an official ban on all party activities.

Arrested in Sibiu by the authorities of Communist Romania, he was investigated by the notorious Securitate officer Gheorghe Crăciun. Hațieganu was prosecuted and sentenced on November 6, 1948 to three years in prison for "PNȚ activism" and "sabotage". He was incarcerated at Cluj, Sighet, Jilava, Văcărești, and Ocnele Mari. In 1951, the term of his imprisonment in the infamous Sighet Prison was increased by another 60 months. He was released on June 15, 1955, and died in Cluj four years later.
