= Madeline Lancaster =

American developmental biologist

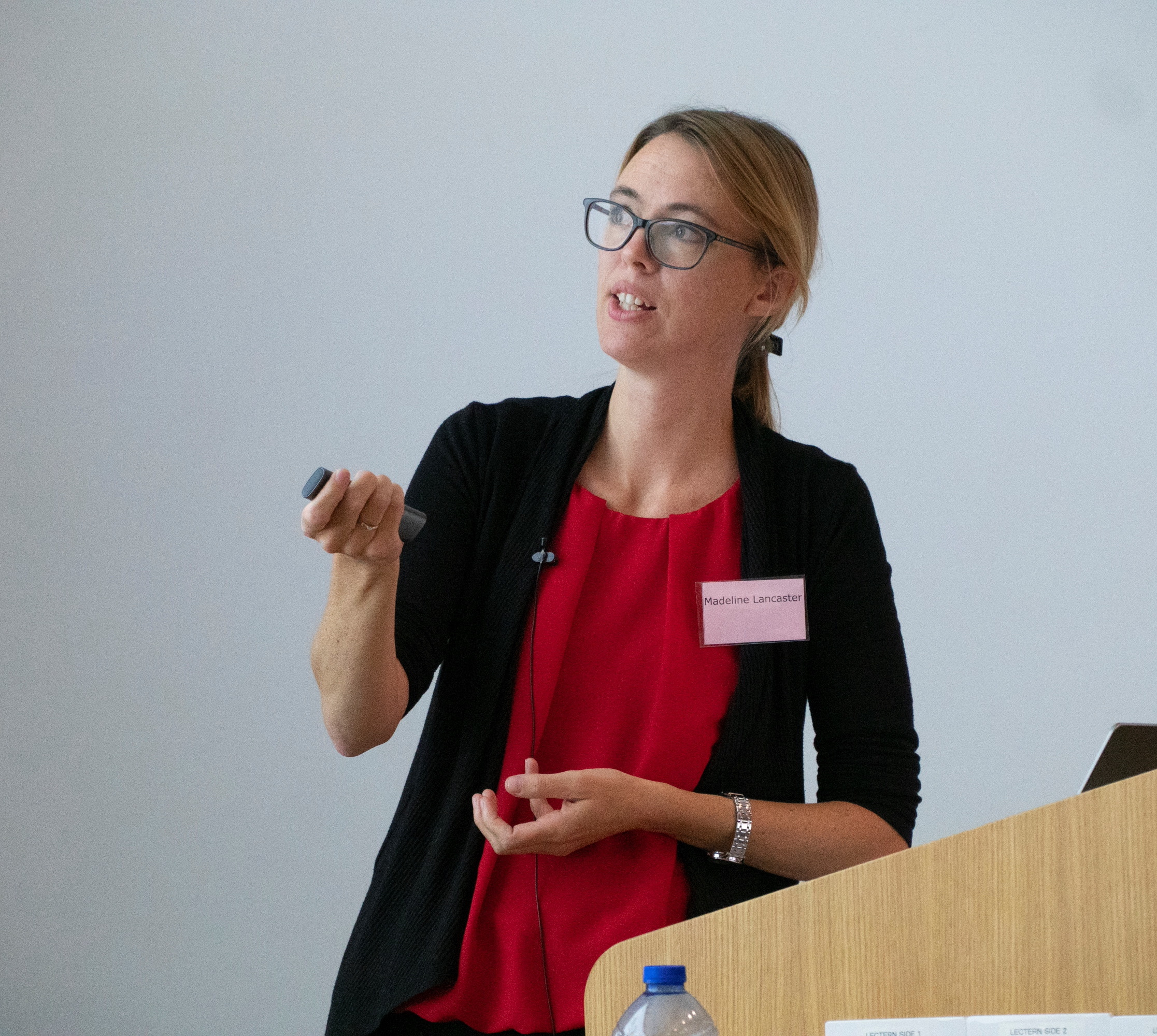
Lancaster speaking at "Ahead of the Curve: Women Scientists at the LMB" symposium at the MRC Laboratory of Molecular Biology in November 2022.

Madeline Lancaster is an American developmental biologist studying neurological development and diseases of the brain. Lancaster is a group leader at the Medical Research Council (MRC) Laboratory of Molecular Biology (LMB) in Cambridge, UK. Since October 2025, Lancaster has served as Joint Head of the LMB's Cell Biology Division.

== Education ==
Lancaster was an undergraduate student at Occidental College in Los Angeles from 2000 to 2004 where she studied biochemistry. She then went on to complete a PhD with Joseph Gleeson at the University of California, San Diego in 2010.

== Career and research ==
Lancaster conducted her post-doctoral work in the lab of Jürgen Knoblich at the Institute of Molecular Biotechnology in Vienna, Austria. This work was supported by fellowships from EMBO, the Helen Hay Whitney Foundation and Marie Sklodowska-Curie Actions. During this time Lancaster developed the technology of cerebral organoids, or brain organoids, and used them to demonstrate the first disease model from induced pluripotent stem cell-derived organoids, an approach that is now widely adopted by labs interested in human neurological disorders.

In 2015 Lancaster joined the Cell Biology division at the LMB, where she currently leads a research group studying the biological processes of human brain evolution. The lab uses the cerebral organoid system to study how genes impact on brain development in a range of species. Recent findings of the Lancaster lab have revealed a key difference in timing of early neuroepithelial decisions in human compared with other apes that leads to an expansion in the founder stem cell pool and thus expansion of cerebral cortical neuron production. Her research also focuses on neurological disorders e.g. microencephaly and macroencephaly.

In addition to using organoids to uncover new biological insight, Lancaster has also improved and developed new organoid methods. These include neural organoids with improved reproducibility, long-term culture using a specialized air-liquid interface to enable functional maturation, the development of new ways of imaging organoids with electron cryo-tomography, and the establishment of organoids that produce cerebrospinal fluid (CSF) and model a selective brain barrier. These new methods were used to investigate infection by SARS-CoV-2, the virus causing COVID-19, revealing infection primarily of the CSF-producing tissue that led to barrier breakdown. Later post-mortem studies confirmed susceptibility of this tissue to the SARS-CoV-2 virus in human COVID-19 patients.

== Awards and honours ==
Lancaster is an MRC Investigator at the Laboratory of Molecular Biology (LMB), affiliated professor of the School of Clinical Medicine, University of Cambridge, affiliated PI at the Cambridge Stem Cell Institute, and a fellow of Clare Hall, Cambridge. Lancaster's achievements have been recognised by numerous awards including:

- Eppendorf Award for Young Investigators in 2014
- 3Rs Prize from the NC3Rs in 2015
- Invited to deliver a TED talk in 2015 entitled 'Growing mini brains to discover what makes us human'
- Named Cell Scientist to watch by the Journal of Cell Science in 2017
- Named an EMBO Young Investigator in 2019
- ISSCR Dr. Susan Lim Award for Outstanding Young Investigator in 2021
- Vallee Scholar in 2021
- UK Life Sciences Laureate, Blavatnik Awards for Young Scientists in the UK in 2022
- Elected as an EMBO member in 2022
- Cheryll Tickle Medal, British Society for Developmental Biology in 2023
- Honorary doctorate, BioMed, Hasselt University, Belgium in 2024
