= Assembloid =

Biological model of 2 or more cell types

An assembloid is a self-organizing three-dimensional system formed by the functional integration of multiple organoids or by combining organoids with specialized cell types or primary tissue explants. They are typically derived from induced pluripotent stem cells. Assembloids have been used to study cell migration, neural circuit assembly, neuro-immune interactions, metastasis, and other complex tissue processes. The method for fusing organoids was a simultaneous discovery in 2017 by three labs. The term assembloid was later coined to standardize terminology.

== History ==
Assembloids were simultaneously discovered three times in 2017 by Pașca, Knoblich, and Park. With Pașca going on to coin the term. These early assembloids joined together regionalised neural organoids to model interneuron migration and circuit formation. Fusions of dorsal and ventral forebrain organoids were used to study the migration of GABAergic interneurons from the ventral to the dorsal forebrain. Both Dorsal-ventral fusions and fusions of medial ganglionic eminence (MGE) and cortical organoids demonstrated integration of migrating interneurons into functional networks.

Assembloids have subsequently been generated to model projections between brain regions, such as cortico-striatal, cortico-spinal, or retino-thalamic. Methods such as Cre recombination combined with G-deleted rabies tracing can be used to identify cells projecting within assembloids; additionally, optogenetic stimulation can demonstrate the assembly of functional neural circuits in vitro.

== Generation of assembloids ==
Assembloid formation starts with the generation of organoids. Initially, human induced pluripotent stem (hiPS) cells are aggregated to generate regionalized organoids through directed differentiation. There are multiple ways in which organoids can be assembled. Regionalized organoids can be put in close proximity resulting in their fusion to generate multi-region assembloids. Alternatively, organoids can be assembled by co-culture with other cell lineages, such as microglia or endothelial cells, or with tissue samples from animal dissection, leading to multi-lineage assembloids. Lastly, organoids can be assembled with morphogenic or organizer-like cells, thus generating polarized assembloids.

The assembloid type depends on the scientific question and the accessibility of cell types required. Major biological fields utilizing the assembloid technique include cancer, gastroenterology, cardiology, and neuroscience. For instance, there are liver assembloids, kidney assembloids, pericytes assembloids to study SARS-COVID2, endometrium assembloids, stomach and colon assembloids, and bladder assembloids.

== Types ==
Assembloids are composed of at least two organoids and/or cells derived from stem cells or primary tissue. They can be assembled to form multi-region or multi-lineage assembloids, as described above.

A. Multi-region assembloids of the nervous system There are techniques to guide organoid differentiation into specific regions of the nervous system. For example, fusion of thalamic and cortical neural organoids models thalamo-cortical projections of ascending sensory input while cortico-striatal assembloids generate the initial projections of motor planning circuits. Forebrain assembloids model interneuron migration into the cerebral cortex. Cortico-motor assembloids can reconstitute aspects of the cortico-spinal-muscle circuit in vitro. Finally, retinal organoids can be combined with thalamic and cortical organoids to model aspects of the ascending visual pathway.

B. Multi-lineage assembloids of the nervous system Some cell types of interest are challenging to differentiate within organoids but can be isolated from tissue explants or derived in monolayer culture. These tissue samples or enriched cell populations can then be integrated with organoid(s) of interest to study their interaction. For example, one current limitation of organoids and assembloids is their lack of functional vasculature, which hinders the supply of nutrients and trophic factors. In a technical advancement, researchers have been able to achieve vascularization by combining neural organoids with endothelial organoids and mesenchymal cells or human embryonic stem cell-derived vascular organoids. Next, microglia-like cells derived from hiPS cells can be introduced into midbrain neural organoids to model neuro-immune interactions. Similarly, oligodendrocytes can be generated in neural organoids and then migrate from the ventral forebrain to the dorsal forebrain. Lastly, combining hiPS cell-derived intestinal organoids with neural crest cells can derive assembloids of the enteric nervous system.

Additionally, assembloids can be categorized as inter-individual or inter-species, depending on whether the organoids are combined from different stem cell lines (e.g., control with disease-associated lines) or different species, respectively. These combinations help determine what aspects of development are cell-autonomous.

== Disease models and applications ==
Assembloids help determine the complex pathophysiology of developmental disorders. For example, Timothy syndrome, which affects L-type calcium channels, was modeled in neural assembloid experiments. When dorsal and ventral forebrain organoids were integrated into an assembloid, interneurons migrated into the dorsal cortical neurons. Timothy syndrome-derived interneurons showed impaired migration. The resulting assembloids developed hypersynchronous neuronal activity, hypothesized to be due to abnormal interneuron integration into circuits. Next, Phelan-McDermid syndrome, also known as 22q13.3 deletion syndrome, is a neurodevelopmental disorder with a high risk of autism spectrum disorder that was modeled in assembloids containing cortical and striatal organoids. This research demonstrated increased striatal medium spiny neuron activity in Phelan-McDermid-derived assembloids after fusion of striatal and cortical organoids but not in isolated striatal organoids. Rett syndrome-derived assembloids displayed hypersynchronous activity perhaps due to an increase in calretinin interneurons. Alzheimer's disease risk allele APOE4, which increases the risk of dementia, has been modeled in assembloids. APOE4-derived assembloids of neural organoids combined with microglia demonstrated increased amyloid-beta-42 secretion, a known Alzheimer biomarker. APOE4 microglia in assembloids had a more complex morphology than in two-dimensional culture and had limited amyloid-beta-42 clearance.

== Limitations ==
Despite the research benefits of assembloids, as for any model system, they have limitations. First, assembloids, like organoids, lack vascularisation, which impairs nutrient diffusion to the surface and eventually leads to necrosis in the core, thus limiting their growth. One way to address this limitation is through transplantation. Grafting cortical organoids into the brains of laboratory rats leads to improved growth and neural development.Another critique of both assembloids and organoids is the lack of sensory input, which is important for the maturation and shaping of circuits during embryonic development. Assembloids and organoids do not currently have a blood brain barrier or immune cells, limiting the biological validity for drug screening or disease modeling.There is a temporal limitation on the investigation of clinically relevant pathophysiology; organoids most closely model initial developmental stages corresponding to fetal and infant neurodevelopment and thus may not accurately model later-onset psychiatric disorders or degenerative conditions. Future directions to address this limitation include studies to understand and accelerate developmental clocks.Next, organoids and assembloids have batch-to-batch variability. Guided differentiation methods reduce variability significantly, yet reproducibility still requires optimization. Finally, the derivation and maintenance of organoids and assembloids require expertise and can be time-intensive and expensive.

== See also ==
- Organoid
- Myelinoid
- Scaffold-free 3D cell culture
- Induced pluripotent stem cells
