= Sidonia Făgărășan =

Romanian biological scientist

- Born: Romania
- Education: Iuliu Hațieganu University of Medicine and Pharmacy; Kyoto University
- Scientific career
- Workplaces: RIKEN
- Academic advisors: Tasuku Honjo

Sidonia Făgărășan is a Romanian biological scientist who is a professor at the Riken Institute in Japan. Her research considers the molecular mechanisms that underpin processes in gut microbioata and the mucosal barrier. In 2020, she was awarded the Kobayashi Foundation Award.

== Early life and career ==
Făgărășan completed training in clinical medicine at Iuliu Hațieganu University of Medicine and Pharmacy. She was a medical resident in Cluj-Napoca, where she completed various training positions and was eventually made assistant professor. During her early career she became interested in the molecular mechanisms that underpin immune homeostasis. In 1998 she moved to Japan as a Visiting Researcher at Kyoto University, and remained there to complete a doctorate.

== Research ==
Făgărășan contributed to the discovery of Activated Induced Deaminase, and went on to short the role of AID in gut homeostasis. In 2002, Făgărășan was appointed leader of the Riken Laboratory for Mucosal Immunity at the Research Centre for Allergy and Immunology.

Făgărășan looks to understand the mechanisms between the microbiota and the immune system at the mucosal barrier. She looks to understand how the gut immune system contributes to the diversity, balance and metabolic functions of microbes. She showed that T-cells, the immune systems that protect the body from infections, change the body's metabolism.

== Awards and honours ==
- 2005 Ministry of Education, Culture, Sports, Science and Technology Young Scientist Award
- 2013 MEXT NISTEP Award
- 2020 Kobayashi Award

== Selected publications ==
- Michelle Linterman; Wim Pierson; Sau K Lee; et al. (24 July 2011). "Foxp3+ follicular regulatory T cells control the germinal center response". Nature medicine. 17 (8): 975–982. doi:10.1038/nm.2425. ISSN 1078-8956. PMC 3182542. PMID 21785433. Wikidata Q35239023.
- Laurence Macia; Jian K Tan; Angélica T Vieira; et al. (1 April 2015). "Metabolite-sensing receptors GPR43 and GPR109A facilitate dietary fibre-induced gut homeostasis through regulation of the inflammasome". Nature Communications. 6 (1): 6734. Bibcode:2015NatCo...6.6734M. doi:10.1038/ncomms7734. ISSN 2041-1723. PMID 25828455. Wikidata Q35591373.
- Sidonia Fagarasan; Masamichi Muramatsu; Keiichiro Suzuki; Hitoshi Nagaoka; Hiroshi Hiai; Tasuku Honjo (1 November 2002). "Critical roles of activation-induced cytidine deaminase in the homeostasis of gut flora". Science. 298 (5597): 1424–1427. doi:10.1126/science.1077336. ISSN 0036-8075. PMID 12434060. Wikidata Q44218058.
