= Iuliu Hațieganu =

Romanian physician

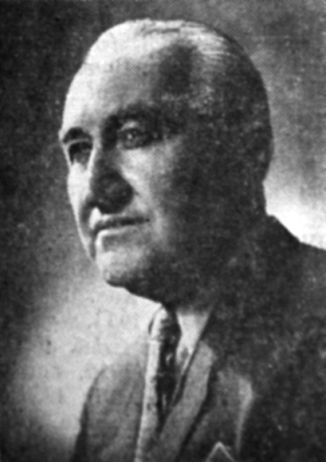
- Born: April 14, 1885; Magyarderzse, Austria-Hungary (now Dârja, Romania)
- Died: September 4, 1959 (aged 74); Cluj, Romanian People's Republic
- Resting place: Hajongard cemetery
- Education: Franz Joseph University
- Occupations: Physician, teacher
- Known for: Research into tuberculosis
- Relatives: Emil Hațieganu (brother)

Iuliu Hațieganu (April 14, 1885 – September 4, 1959) was a Romanian internist doctor particularly recognized for research done in the field of tuberculosis. He founded in Cluj a valuable school of internal medicine. Today, Cluj University of Medicine and Pharmacy bears his name. He was a member of the Romanian Academy and brother of politician Emil Hațieganu. He was also an architect, and his work was part of the architecture event in the art competition at the 1936 Summer Olympics.

== Early life and studies ==
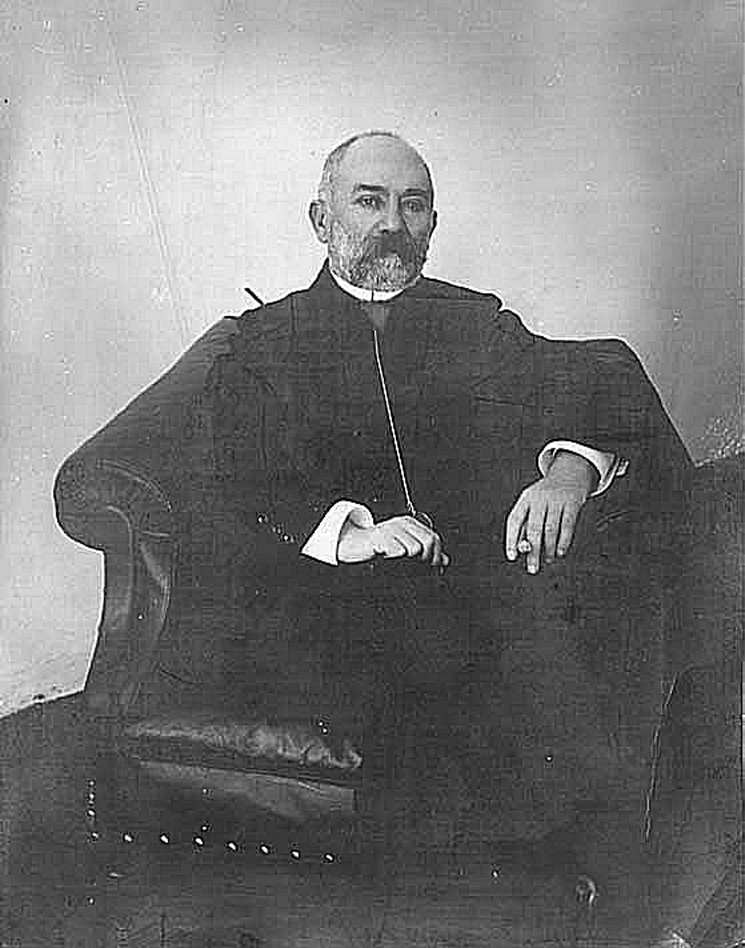
Zsigmond Purjesz promoted Iuliu Hațieganu as physician, while Iuliu was his university assistant between 1910 and 1918.

Iuliu Hațieganu was born on April 14, 1885, in the village of Magyarderzse, Kingdom of Hungary (today Dârja, Romania) in the Someș Valley, the fifth of 13 children of the Romanian Greek Catholic priest Hațieganu. He began studying at Balázsfalva (today Blaj, Romania), where he had as colleague the future bishop Iuliu Hossu, then studied at the Faculty of Medicine of Franz Joseph University. After completing his doctorate in 1910, he became assistant to professor Zsigmond Puryesz. Since 1914 he was known for performing a study on alimentary galactosury. In 1918, during the Great Union of December 1, Iuliu took part in the Great National Assembly of Alba Iulia, where he has urged his colleagues to hold a congress of Transylvanian Romanian doctors. The event was chaired by young doctor on January 29, 1919, in Sibiu.

His outstanding merits and Puryesz's vision helped Iuliu Hațieganu to become professor of medical clinic at the University of Cluj and first dean of the Faculty of Medicine between 1919 and 1920. In 1929, Professor Iuliu Hațieganu took over the Cluj branch of Transylvanian Association for Romanian Literature and Romanian People (ASTRA).

In the early '30s, he became rector of the University of Cluj, focusing his activity on the importance of a special role of physical education in institutions of higher education. His belief was so strong that in order to attract young people to embrace this bold idea, he organized thematic conferences, published a journal of education, built a sports park in Cluj, hired four physical education teachers. In 1935, Professor Hațieganu wrote: It turned out that physical education is the best method of education, that synergically contribute to strengthening of body and soul, to character building...

Hațieganu was very interested in medical research and humans, and to assist all, such that he provided patients free consultations and advice. He was so interested and experienced, that he could establish the diagnosis of a patient only if he saw how he moves and how he looks. Along with one of his students, Professor Ion Goia, Hațieganu developed pathological model theory of peasants and workers, these patients being hospitalized preferentially because they claim better teaching.

He was inspired by Hippocrates and Pasteur, and was appointed by Tudor Arghezi as "professor of the Romanian medicine".

Iuliu Hațieganu founded the University of Medicine and Pharmacy in Cluj, that exists today, and bears his name since 1993, and was a member of the Romanian Academy. He was well known for interest in the physical education, human health, the creation of the sports parks, but also because of research he has done on tuberculosis.

== Establishing a Transylvanian Medical School and Tradition ==
His first notable medical paper (on food intake-related galactosuria) appeared in the "Medical Journal" in Budapest (1914). He was one of the delegates to the Great National Assembly in Alba Iulia where he represented the young Faculty and pleaded with the Ruling Council of Transylvania for the establishment of the University of Cluj. Subsequently, he would chair the first Congress of Physicians, where his friend, military doctor Iuliu Moldovan, appointed by the Ruling Council as secretary for Public Health, would report on the health status of the population in Transylvania, and make a strong argument for the establishment of the Faculty of Medicine in Cluj, where Hațieganu was appointed a professor.

Aged 34, he delivered the first university lecture in Romanian in Transylvania, on "The Catarrhal Jaundice Problem", and effectively laid the foundations of medical higher education in Cluj. During the period between the two World Wars, along with Ion Goia, Iuliu Hațieganu gathered around him a group of outstanding specialists such as Victor Papilian, Titu Vasiliu, Iacob Iacobovici, Constantin Ureche, Victor Babeș, Constantin Levaditi or Emil Racoviță. Following the Second Vienna Award, the Cluj University Hospital had to be moved to Sibiu. Hațieganu thus established a prominent and prestigious medical school, which is still extant, and which now bears his name.

In Cluj Hațieganu established and funded between 1930 and 1932 a youth sports park, the Iuliu Hațieganu Sports Park, on the shore of Someș River with an area of 25 ha. It was dedicated to the memory of his only child, who died at only 8 years of age.

== The communist period and involvement in politics ==
With the establishment of communism, the new political situation affected both Hațieganu and his collaborators, many being dismissed under the pretext of so-called "popular judgments". Between April 29 and July 14, 1931, Iuliu Hațieganu was named Minister of State in Iorga Government. He was also appointed Minister of Health, but early resigned, inasmuch as it was rejected proposal to establish a portfolio of Physical Education.
