= Iuliu Hațieganu University of Medicine and Pharmacy =

Medical education institution in Cluj-Napoca, Romania

Coordinates: 46.762061°N 23.5836°E

- Universitatea de Medicină și Farmacie „Iuliu Hațieganu"
- Former names: Institute of Medicine and Pharmacy of Cluj-Napoca (1948–1990)
- Type: State university
- Established: 1919; 107 years ago - Faculty of Medicine of Cluj
- Academic affiliations: International Association of Universities, Banco Santander, S.A., Agence universitaire de la Francophonie European University Association
- Rector: Anca Dana Buzoianu
- Academic staff: 885
- Students: 8,029 (2019–2020)
- Undergraduates: 7,153
- Postgraduates: 876
- Location: Strada Victor Babeş 8, Cluj-Napoca, Romania
- Language: Romanian, French, English
- Colours: Blue and white
- Nickname: UMF Cluj
- Website: www.umfcluj.ro

Iuliu Hațieganu University of Medicine and Pharmacy (Romanian: Universitatea de Medicină și Farmacie „Iuliu Hațieganu", or UMF Cluj) in Cluj-Napoca, Romania, is the oldest medical education institution in Transylvania, a continuation of the Faculty of Medicine which was founded in 1919, as a part of the Superior Dacia University. The university has over 6,000 national and international students, 2,400 resident physicians, as well as over 1,100 teachers and researchers. It was named in honor of the scientist Iuliu Hațieganu. The university is classified as an "advanced research and education university" by the Ministry of Education.

== History ==
Higher education in Cluj dates from 1581. University life gradually developed, outlining various fields and specialties of study. Among them, medicine has played an essential part. Thus, the Medical-Surgical School was established in Cluj in 1775. Here the teacher was the well-known oculist Ioan Piuariu-Molnar, who was also the first titrated Romanian doctor. In 1816, the medical-surgical school was transformed in the Medical-Surgical High School.

The Hungarian Faculty of Medicine was founded at the very beginning of the existence of Franz Joseph University in Cluj in 1872. Between 1888 and 1901 the clinics and institutes of the Faculty were built on Mikó Street ( known today as Clinics Street).

Soon after the Union of Transylvania with Romania, medical and pharmaceutical education witnessed a major transformation. In 1919, the Romanian Faculty of Medicine was established as part of Superior Dacia University. The first dean and organizer of the Faculty was Iuliu Hațieganu, who was subsequently made rector magnificus of this university. Due to his initiative, new disciplines were created, including medical semiology, radiology, stomatology and history of medicine, which were firsts for medical education in Romania. At the same time, Professor Gheorghe Bilașcu founded at Cluj the first discipline of stomatology in Romania. Between 1919 and 1934, the Faculty of Medicine included an important department of pharmacy, founded and chaired by Professor Gheorghe Pamfil. Four years later, the Palace of University Clinics was inaugurated in 1938.

A turning point in medical and pharmaceutical education was achieved in 1948, when the Medico-Pharmaceutical Institute became independent, organized into five different faculties: General Medicine, Pediatrics, Stomatology, Pharmacy and Hygiene – the latter being active only for a single decade. The Faculty of Medicine had the largest share.

Since 1990, medical and pharmaceutical education at Cluj-Napoca evolved at a rapid pace. The same year, the Medico-Pharmaceutical Institute changed its name to the University of Medicine and Pharmacy. The iconic Iuliu Hațieganu became the university's namesake in 1992.

Celebrating 90 years of Romanian medical education in Cluj, UMF Cluj inaugurated in 2009 the Valeriu Bologa Museum of the History of Medicine and Pharmacy in Cluj, located on Avram Iancu Street 31.

== Faculties ==
=== Faculty of Medicine ===
After the dramatic political, economical, and social changes that took place in Romania in 1989, the university has undergone significant changes in its image and organization. The spiritual life has become more dynamic, the logistic support a lot more substantial, and the methods have been improved and modernized. Each member of the teaching staff has benefited by participation in international conventions and trainings in new techniques in either a Western European country or the United States.

Owing to a large degree to the great raise in admissions of foreign students, the Faculty of Medicine of the Cluj-Napoca University of Medicine and Pharmacy has become an international institution, with a significant increase in the number of students registering in a post-graduate program.

Preexisting education spaces have been modernized and several others have been built. Students of the Faculty of Medicine have the opportunity to study under the most modern conditions, as well as to participate at courses that are held in well-equipped lecture rooms.

The Faculty of Medicine offers study programs at bachelor, master, doctoral and residency degree, as well as continuing medical training. The four programs of study at undergraduate level are:

- Medicine – university studies lasting six years
- Nursing – university studies lasting four years
- Radiology and Medical Imaging – university studies lasting three years
- Balneophysiokinetotherapy and Recovery – university studies lasting three years

Within the Faculty of Medicine are 13 master's programs with courses of study lasting one or two years.

The Faculty of Medicine is divided into 12 departments and 69 disciplines:

- Morphological sciences
- Functional sciences
- Molecular sciences
- Community medicine
- Internal medicine
- Medical specialties
- Surgery
- Surgical specialties
- Mother and child
- Neuroscience
- Oncology
- Medical education

=== Faculty of Dentistry ===
The Faculty of Dentistry has the largest tradition of the faculties, as it was the first department of medical education that was established in the country.

The Faculty of Dentistry is divided into four departments and 13 disciplines:

- Maxillofacial surgery and radiology
- Conservative odontology
- Oral rehabilitation
- Prosthetics and dental materials

=== Faculty of Pharmacy ===
The Faculty of Pharmacy has been the second faculty intended for higher medical education which has been founded in Cluj, following the Great Union. It is known for its positive dynamic constancy, that has been created due to the remarkable increase of Romanian and foreign students, as well as the rich diversity of the education methods.

The Faculty of Pharmacy is divided into four departments and 21 disciplines:

- Fundamental sciences with pharmaceutical direction
- Biology and natural products
- Medicine action and analysis
- Medicine preparation and legislation

== Conferences ==
=== Medicalis ===
Medicalis is the annual conference for medical students and young doctors organized by the Medical Students' Organization and the Faculty of Medicine. Medicalis, which attracts over 800 national and international participants each year, focuses in medical sciences of all fields. The conference, which includes five sections for oral presentations, a section for poster presentations, workshops and lectures by experienced speakers, as well as a pleasant social program, has been one of the most popular conferences for medical students and young doctors in Romania.

== Research ==
Scientific research represents one of the missions assumed through UMF Cluj. Research activities are run in all disciplines and departments of the university, and financial support is ensured by grants and research contracts. The effort of teaching staff collectives and the institutional framework was improved by the creation of the Department for Research and Development. UMF Cluj has two excellence centers and seven research centers in the university.

== Publications ==
The Clujul Medical magazine (official website here) publishes four issues every year, with original articles, articles regarding clinical or fundamental research, literature synthesis, papers on standardization, tutorials, letters to the editor, book reviews, advertisements for professional events, as well as other materials that are left to the editorial board's discretion. Clujul Medical was founded in February 1920, as the journal of the Medical School in Cluj, and appeared almost without interruption.

Iuliu Hațieganu's own publishing house, established in 1998, has released over 400 titles of professional books and eight new titles of medical journals.

== Library ==
Valeriu Bologa, the library of UMF Cluj established in 1949, is a member of the European Association for Health Information and Libraries. It has over 300,000 books and journals in Romanian, English and French and over 6,000 subscribed members. The director of the library is Andrei Achimaș.

== Alumni ==
- Raed Arafat (1964–), Secretary of State for Health
- Gheorghe Benga (1944–), physician, biologist, and professor
- Gheorghe Bilașcu (1863–1926), stomatologist
- Lucian Valeriu Bologa (1892–1971), physician and historian of medicine
- Augustin Buzura (1938–2017), novelist and short story writer
- Salvator Cupcea (1908–1958), psychologist, physician, and politician
- Horia Demian (1942–1989), basketball player
- Sidonia Făgărășan, biological scientist
- Octavian Fodor (1913–1976), physician
- Iacob Iacobovici (1879–1959), surgeon and professor
- Iuliu Hațieganu (1885–1959), physician
- Iuliu Moldovan (1882–1966), physician and discoverer of reticulin
- Anamaria Nesteriuc (1993–), athlete
- Mihai Netea (1968–), physician and professor
- Victor Papilian (1888–1956), physician, writer, and professor
- Sergiu P. Pașca (1982–), neuroscientist
- Laura Poantă (1971–), physician, translator, painter, and professor
- Emil Racoviță (1868–1947), savant, explorer, speleologist, biologist, and founder of biospeleology
