= Alexandru Roșca (psychologist) =

Romanian psychologist and professor

Doctor Alexandru Roșca
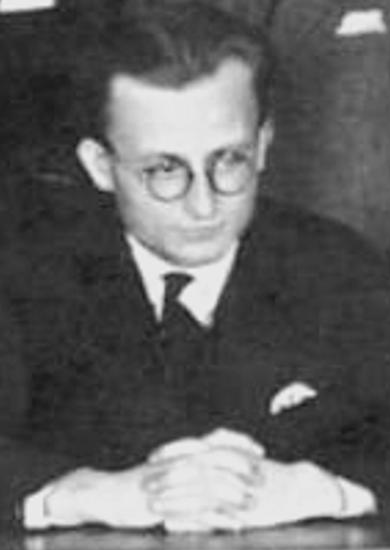
- Roșca (circa 1928)
- Born: August 23, 1906; Nagykalota, Austria-Hungary (now Călata, Cluj County, Romania)
- Died: February 17, 1996 (aged 89); Cluj-Napoca, Romania
- Education: Babeș-Bolyai University
- Scientific career
- Fields: Psychologist
- Workplaces: Babeș-Bolyai University

Alexandru Roșca (23 August 1906 – 17 February 1996) was a Romanian psychologist and professor. In 1991, he was elected a titular member of the Romanian Academy.

== Works ==
- Psihopatologia deviaților morali (1931)
- Adaptarea socială (1938)
- Motivele acțiunii umane (1943)
- Tehnica psihologiei experimentale și practice (1947)
- Tratat de psihologie experimentală (1963)
- Psihologia muncii industriale (1967)
- Metodologie și tehnici experimentale în psihologie (1971)
- Psihologie generală (1976)
- Sinteze de psihologie contemporană (1980)
