= List of rail accidents in Romania =

This is an incomplete chronological list of railway crashes and incidents in Romania (including parts of modern Moldova and former parts of the Kingdom of Hungary).

== 19th century ==
- 16 August, 1869 – A fatal traffic accident occurred at the Timișoara horse-drawn railway near the city fortress wall when the last tram to the Fabric district struck a presumably intoxicated pedestrian.
- October 14, 1884 – The boiler of the locomotive C.F.R. 146 - RUCĂRU (later renumbered C.F.R. 539) exploded at the Azuga station. The engineer and the fireman lost their lives.
- June 3, 1894 - The passenger train traveling on the Cluj - Teiuș route derailed, due to exceeding the maximum permitted speed. When passing over the station entrance switches, the two locomotives pulling the train derailed and broke away from the rest of the train, causing the derailment of all the wagons they were towing. In the overturned wagons, 7 passengers lost their lives and 60 other people were injured.

== 20th century ==
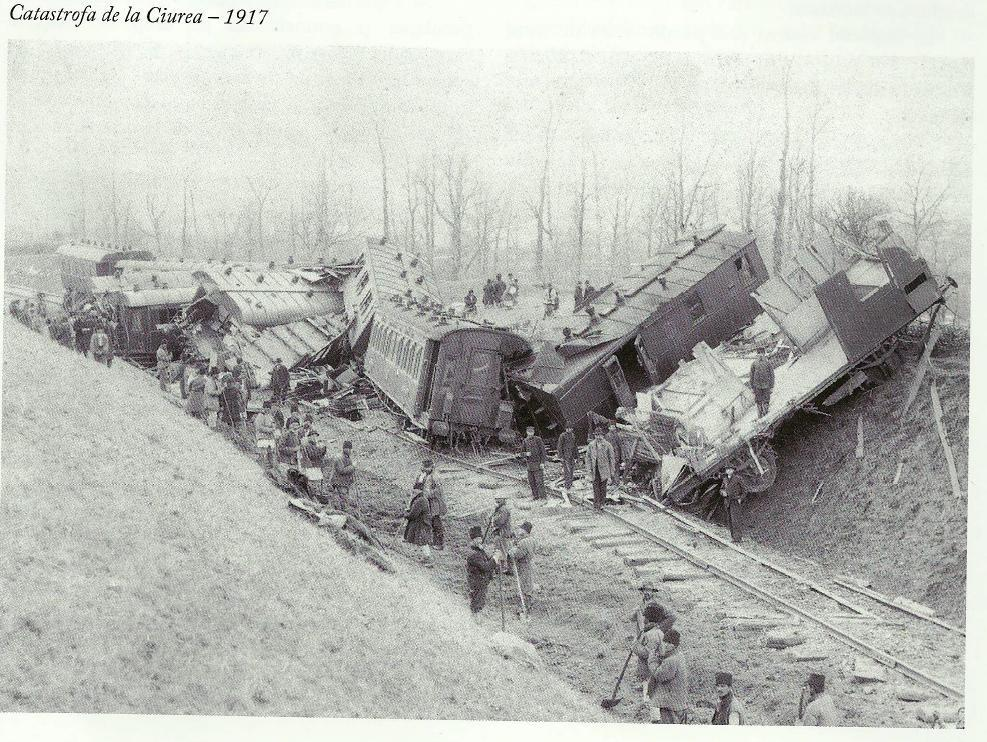
Ciurea rail disaster, January 13, 1917

Rail accident near Craiova, 11 October 1918 (Illustrierte Kronen Zeitung, 1918)

Railway disaster near Bucharest, c. 15 March 1925 (Das interessante Blatt, 1925)

=== 1900s ===
- August 10, 1907 – Dynamite explosive plant was set under the rails near Feldioara station, close to Brașov and exploded under the incoming train. No one was injuded and after half an hour the train continued to the Brașov railway station.

=== 1910s ===
- December 6, 1913 – One hundred people were killed by a collision at Costești.
- January 13, 1917 – Ciurea rail disaster: A passenger train overloaded with soldiers and refugees runs away down a bank between Bârnova and Ciurea, derailing at Ciurea station after being diverted onto a loop line. Between 600 and 1,000 killed in the derailment and subsequent fire.
- June 29(?), 1918 – An express passenger train collides with a goods train between Mircești and Roman, killing 45.
- October 11, 1918 – Due to heavy rains a part of track embankment collapsed under the passing passenger train about 7 km west from Craiova station causing its derailment. At least 25 people died during the crash.

=== 1920s ===
- October 27, 1920 – At Lufany, an inexperienced railwayman's error cause two passenger trains to collide, killing about 50 and injuring 200 or more.
- July 13, 1922 – Bridge collapse near the Valea Largă station at the Ploieşti-Predeal railway threw part of the passing passenger train to the river.
- 19 September 1922 – Bridge collapse on the Ploieşti-Predeal railway.
- July 2, 1923 – Vintileanca rail accident: At Vintileanca, Buzău, between Ploești and Bezeu (now Ploiești and Buzău), a shunter's error diverts a mail train from Bucharest to Iași into a siding where it crashes into a stationary goods train killing 63 people and injuring 100 injured.
- c. 15 March 1925 – Due to a human factor mistake the freight train coming from Constanța collided with the military train at the outskirts of Bucharest. From forty of reservists onboard 14 were killed during the crash and eighteen more seriously injured.
- October 26, 1928 – At Reșca, a fast train to Bucharest is incorrectly diverted onto a track occupied by the Simplon Orient Express. Two cars of the diverted train telescope and almost everyone in them is killed; 34 were killed altogether. In the aftermath there were complaints that the station staff were so unhelpful that the passengers had to telegraph for rescue. Several railwaymen are punished by firing or suspension.

=== 1930s ===
- July 16, 1930 – The collision of a passenger and a freight train between Petrova and Vișeu Bistra results in the deaths of 22 people.
- December 24, 1938 – At Etulia (present-day Moldova), two passenger trains collide head-on on single track due to a misunderstanding between stationmasters. One is a local; the other is carrying soldiers going on leave. Altogether 93 people are killed, including a general and two colonels, and 147 are injured.

=== 1940s ===
- November 2 1944 – A military train and goods train collide at Craiova, killing 60 and injuring 100.

=== 1960s ===
- July 22, 1962 – A passenger train derailed between Bucharest and Mogoșoaia due to excess speed, killing 32 people.
- May 31 1966 – Soon after starting from Bucharest, an express to Galați collided with a local train; 38 people were killed and 65 were injured. The country's railways minister was fired.
- October 7, 1968 – Bucerdea rail accident: A fast passenger train collided head-on with a local train at Bucerdea Grânoasă, killing 22 people and injuring 72.

=== 1990s ===
- August 21, 1990 – Collision of the Rapid 24 express train with a freight locomotive near Ormeniș caused death of two members of locomotive staff, while 13 were injured.

== 21st century ==
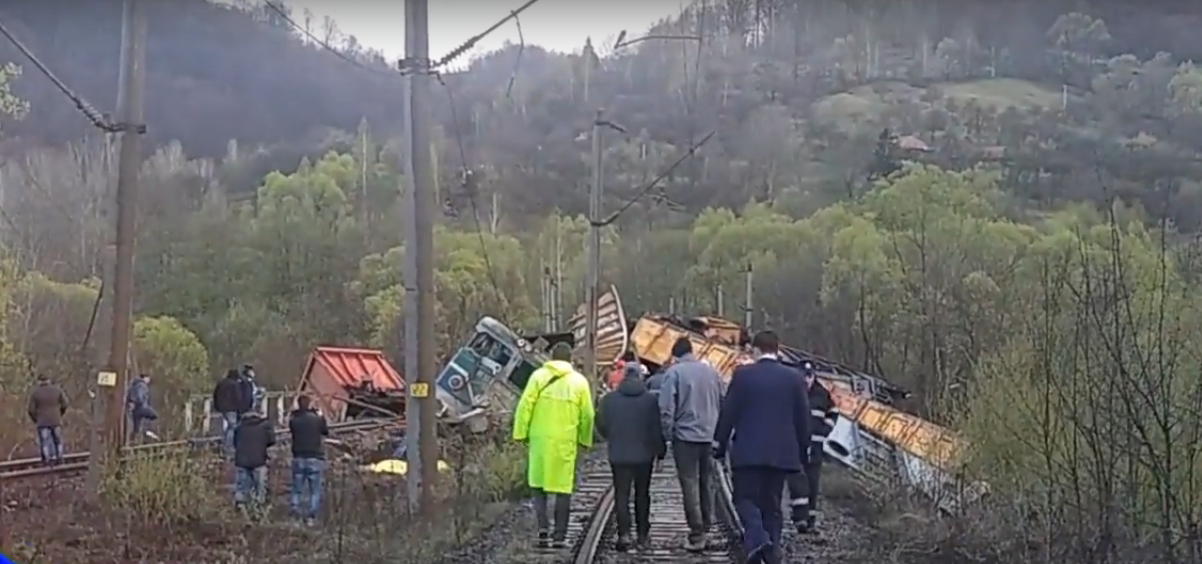
Merișor derailment, April 8, 2017

=== 2000s ===
- May 10, 2008 – The locomotive and three cars of Romanian National Railway Company (CFR) passenger train No 1661 going from Bucharest to Iași derailed at a defective switch near Valea Calugareasca station in Prahova County. A 17-year-old girl was killed and four others were injured.
- August 14, 2009 – Scânteia train accident: at least 14 people were killed in a collision between a minibus and a train in Scânteia, Iași County.

=== 2010s ===
- May 10, 2012 – More than 92 people were injured in a crash involving three trams in western Bucharest.
- November 29, 2016 – A collision between two trains in Gorj County left one dead and another in critical condition.
- April 8, 2017 – Merișor derailment: train crash on the Târgu Jiu to Simeria line caused death of the both crew members on board.

=== 2020s ===
- March 25, 2023 – In Galați, a locomotive ran into a car at high speed, killing one and injuring three.
- February 19, 2025 – In Olt County, two freight trains collided, killing a conductor.

== See also ==
- Classification of railway accidents
- Rail transport in Romania
- List of rail accidents
- List of rail accidents by country
- List of accidents and disasters by death toll#Rail accidents and disasters

== Biography ==
- Radu, Bellu (2012). Catastrofe Si Sabotaje Feroviare in Romania (1860-1980) (in Romanian). ISBN 1-85260-323-2.
- Semmens, Peter (1994). Railway Disasters of the World: Principal Passenger Train Accidents of the 20th Century. Patrick Stephens Ltd. ISBN 1-85260-323-2.
