= Curături =

Curături may refer to several villages in Romania:

- Curături, a village in Roşia Montană Commune, Alba County
- Curături, a village in Ciurea Commune, Iaşi County
