= George Giuglea =

George Giuglea (January 29, 1884 – April 7, 1967) was an Austro-Hungarian-born Romanian linguist and philologist.

== Biography ==
=== Origins and education ===
He was born in Satulung, a village that today is incorporated into Săcele city, close to Brașov in southeast Transylvania. The family were shepherds, and Giuglea's childhood was divided between his native village and Roseți, Călărași County, in the Romanian Old Kingdom. Like other local shepherds, his parents would leave their mountainous home and cross the border, taking their sheep to spend the winter on the plains, in a warmer climate, close to the Danube. Giuglea attended Andrei Șaguna High School in Brașov, followed by the literature and philosophy faculty of the University of Bucharest in the Romanian capital. His professors included Titu Maiorescu, Nicolae Iorga, Ioan Bianu, Dimitrie Onciul and Simion Mehedinți. Ovid Densusianu was particularly influential for the student, who would compose an evocative obituary for him in 1938.

After taking his degree in Romanian and Romance philology, he worked as a clerk at the Romanian Academy and then as a high-school teacher. While teaching at Târgoviște, Densusianu, who admired his qualities, suggested that Giuglea go to Paris for specialized study. Without a scholarship and lacking his own means, he was about to abandon the idea. However, he was in Paris at the end of 1912, and between 1913 and 1914 lectured on Romanian language and literature at the Sorbonne, in the department created in 1912 for Mario Roques. He left France upon the outbreak of World War I; once back home, he volunteered for service in a vânători de munte regiment, seeing action upon Romania's entry into the war in 1916. In 1919, following the end of the war and the union of Transylvania with Romania, Sextil Pușcariu invited him to the new University of Cluj, where he chaired the Romance department until retiring. In 1920, he defended his thesis at Cluj with Pușcariu and not, as he had intended, at Bucharest with Densusianu.

=== Career at Cluj ===
Giuglea completed his Romance studies in Italy from 1920 to 1921, with Matteo Bartoli at the University of Turin and Ernesto Giacomo Parodi at the University of Florence. The former initiated him into the principles and methods underpinning the new field of linguistic geography, while the latter deepened his knowledge of Vulgar Latin and Italian dialects. After returning from Italy, he began holding courses and seminars on Romance philology in Cluj, while attending the weekly meetings of Pușcariu's Museum of the Romanian Language circle, where he presented the results of his own research. He was a constant contributor to Dacoromania.

Although he did not actually work on the major project that was Atlasul lingvistic român, he did take part in the meetings were problems related to its composition were debated. One of the most thorny questions revolved around the phonetical transcription of responses to interviews for the atlas; the International Phonetic Alphabet was discarded because it did not encompass all sounds of the Romanian language. After lengthy discussions, Giuglea's proposal was adopted: the normal Romanian orthography would be supplemented by necessary diacritics in order to render faithfully the speech recorded. Thus, the atlas became more readily accessible not only to linguists but also to historians, geographers, and folklorists. In 1930 and 1937, he took study trips to Spain in order to deepen his understanding of Romance philology. For the rest of his life, he remained attracted by the Spanish language and fascinated by its literature. Concerned with the development of Hispanic studies at Cluj, he founded a Spanish lectureship within the Romance philology department, with the position assigned to an academic from Spain.

He was elected a corresponding member of the Romanian Academy in 1936. In 1940, after the Second Vienna Award assigned Northern Transylvania to Hungary, he withdrew to Sibiu, together with the university and the museum. He returned to Cluj in 1945, continuing as a professor until 1947, when he reached the retirement age. He was stripped of Academy membership by the new communist regime in 1948. However, his scientific activity continued: he took part in sessions of the Museum (which became the Linguistics Institute in 1948), and organized the gathering of toponymic and anthroponymic material, surrounding himself with younger collaborators from Cluj but also Timișoara and Pitești. He died in Bucharest in 1967 and, in accordance with his wishes, was buried in Cluj.

== Research ==
Giuglea began publishing in Densusianu's Buletinul Societății Filologice while still a student, submitting a study of the Săcele speech in 1907 and one on pastoral terminology in 1908. He would continue to focus on the terminology associated with sheepherding for the rest of his career. Also as a student, he participated in a project to collect dialectal texts from around the Romanian-speaking areas. Assigned the Moldavia and Bukovina regions, he published an article on the Bukovina variety of Romanian in 1907. Interested in folklore and ethnography from a young age, he and geographer George Vâlsan traveled to Serbia in 1910 and 1911, publishing two works on the Romanians of Serbia. He continued to publish studies of folklore, including one in 1918 about Bessarabia.

Nevertheless, his research interests shifted toward a historic and etymological study of the Romanian lexis and a determination of the language's relationship to its Romance counterparts. Giuglea's first published foray into this domain was a 1909 work on Latin elements in Romanian, devoting special attention to pastoral and agricultural vocabulary. His study of etymology aimed to support the Daco-Romanian continuity thesis of the origin of the Romanians through linguistic arguments. To this end, he assembled a list of some 400 words of Latin origin found in Romanian but not in the Aromanian language. He continued to emphasize Latinity in the early communist period, when the emphasis was on exaggerating the Slavic influence.

At the same time, he was deeply interested in exploring the pre-Roman Eastern Romance substratum. However, his attempts to demonstrate Germanic influence from passing Goths and Gepids, as well as old Greek elements, proved less convincing. Toponymy was another of his preoccupations. As a Romance scholar, he was interested in lexical and semantic parallels between Romanian and, in particular, the Iberian Romance languages. After retiring, he remained in Cluj although his family lived in Bucharest, and despite advancing blindness, published a significant number of articles in his later years.
