= George Vâlsan =

Romanian geographer and writer

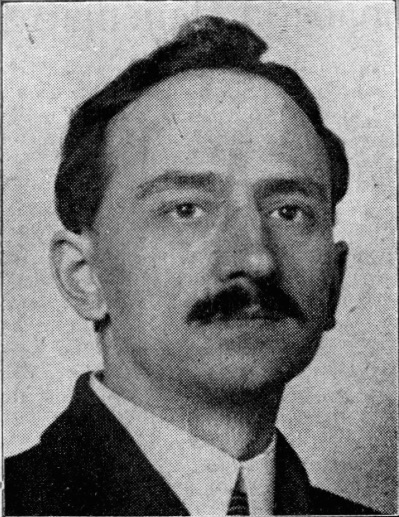
George Vâlsan

George Vâlsan (January 22, 1885 – August 6, 1935) was a Romanian geographer and writer.

== Biography ==
=== Education and career ===
Born in Bucharest, he attended primary school in Iași and Craiova, and began high school in Pitești. He completed secondary education at the Gheorghe Lazăr High School in Bucharest, graduating in 1904. He then attended the Faculty of Letters and Philosophy at the University of Bucharest, obtaining his diploma in 1908. Encouraged by Titu Maiorescu and Simion Mehedinți, he continued his studies of geography in Berlin and, under Emmanuel de Martonne, in Paris.

After returning home, Vâlsan taught high school in Târgu Jiu and Bucharest from 1909 to 1915. In 1916 he obtained a doctorate from the University of Bucharest; his was the first Ph.D. in Geography awarded in Romania. He was then assistant professor at the University of Iași, where he taught geography. In January 1917 he was seriously injured in the Ciurea rail disaster, which left him crippled. In 1920, he was made professor of physical geography at the new University of Cluj. There, he set up an institute of geography, endowing it with numerous modern maps, tools, books and magazines, both Romanian and foreign. He also published an affiliated journal, Lucrările Institutului de Geografie al Universității din Cluj.

In 1929, Vâlsan was hired as a professor in the new department of physical geography at the University of Bucharest, remaining there until his death. His clear, flowing, well-explained lectures were noted for their effectiveness, in part due to his having taught pedagogy in the early 1910s. Elected a titular member of the Romanian Academy in 1920, he was also a librarian and active member at the Romanian Geographic Society. During the last year of his life, he removed the volumes of the library, scattered in the basement of the Romanian Athenaeum, and set it up on iron shelves in a reading room.

=== Scientific activity ===
A foremost authority on physical geography within Romania, he published in Anuarul de Geografie și Antropogeografie (1910–1915), Buletinul Societății Regale Române de Geografie (from 1912), Buletinul Institutului Geologic and Analele Academiei Române (from 1915). His most significant scientific contribution was the 1916 article "Câmpia Română", a study of the Wallachian Plain. In 1926, he published "Coasta de Argint", which combined literary prose and scientific analysis in its examination of the Balcic area along the Black Sea coast in Southern Dobruja. The work spurred enthusiasm for the region and led to the founding of a society named after the article. "Valea superioară a Prahovei" (1924) was a similarly poetic look at the Bucegi Mountains. Other articles included "Asupra trecerii Dunării prin Porțile de Fier" (1916) and "Văile, origina și evoluția lor" (1919). These publications brought him international repute, and he was part of geographic study committees at congresses held in Paris, London, and Warsaw.

His interests extended to ethnography and folklore. Research he conducted in 1910 with George Giuglea resulted in published work on the Romanians of Serbia. His brochure, O nouă Știință, Etnografia, appeared in 1927. His 1913 study, "România și popoarele balcanice", was used for a fresh work in 1918 by Orest Tafrali to press Romanian claims on Serbia. A pair of conferences was published as "Carpații în România de azi" (1924) and "Influențele mediului fizic asupra capitalului biologic național" (1927), while "Basarabia" appeared in 1924. His "Opera Geografică a Prințului D. Cantemir" (1924–1925) used previously unavailable documents and maps to argue that Dimitrie Cantemir was a precursor to the modern science of geography. In "Geografie și Poezie" (1931) he summarized his view of the close relationship between science and poetry, as found in nature.

=== Literature ===
Vâlsan was also a writer of literature, and his first published work, "Valea Prahovei", appeared in Ziarul Călătoriilor in 1900, when he was 15. He continued to write for Sămănătorul, Convorbiri Literare, Convorbiri Critice, Neamul roomânesc, Drum drept, and Ramuri. His two books were Povestea unei tinereți, a 1924 prose book; and Grădina părăsită (1925). The latter is a collection of over 40 poems, mainly published in 1904 in Sămănătorul and Convorbiri Literare. They tend to be subtle portraits of nature, infused with sunlight. Although Vâlsan suffered much during his life, he attempted to conceal this in his writing.

A solitary, even misanthropic figure, Vâlsan found politics repugnant. However, he was a lifelong friend of Nicolae Iorga's, although it was not the latter's political side that attracted him. During World War I, he was an adviser to the cabinet, sending weekly reports about the various areas inhabited by ethnic Romanians in preparation for claims to be made during the eventual peace conference. While in Cluj, he presided over the geographic section of Astra. There, he started a geographic and ethnographic library and published a series of popular brochures. Vâlsan's health began to deteriorate during World War I. In the summer of 1935, he canceled a planned study trip to the Apuseni Mountains, instead heading to Dobruja to receive a large group of Polish tourists. He took advantage of several days' rest at the children's tuberculosis sanatorium in Carmen-Sylva, where he had good relations, and died there.

== Legacy ==
Streets in the Crângași neighborhood of Bucharest and in Craiova are named after Vâlsan. A high school in Făurei and a gymnasium in Amara also bear his name.
