= Sextil Pușcariu =

Romanian diplomat and academic (1877–1948)

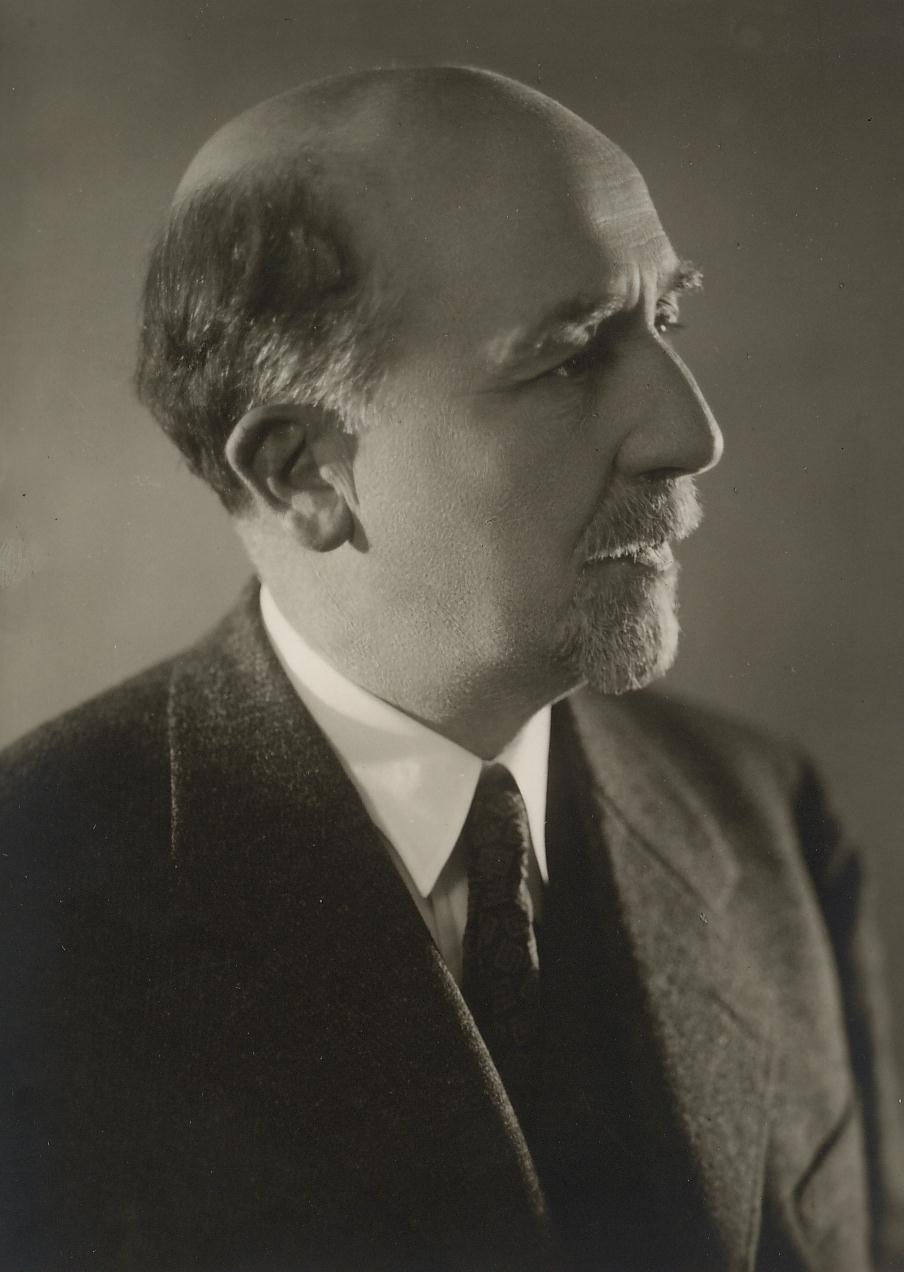
- Born: 4 January 1877; Brassó (Brașov), Austria-Hungary
- Died: 5 May 1948 (aged 71); Bran, Romanian People's Republic

Academic background
- Education: University of Paris; Leipzig University; University of Vienna
- Influences: Matteo Bartoli, Jules Gilliéron, Nicolae Iorga, Simion Mehedinți, Wilhelm Meyer-Lübke, Gaston Paris, Vasile Pârvan, Romulus Vuia, Gustav Weigand

Academic work
- Era: 20th century
- School or tradition: Positivism
- Main interests: lexicography, sociolinguistics, dialectology, cultural sociology, ethography, phonoaesthetics, onomastics, literary criticism, literature of Romania
- Influenced: Theodor Capidan, Silviu Dragomir, George Giuglea, Alphonse Juilland, Constantin Lacea, Dumitru Macrea, Ion Mușlea, Emil Petrovici, Sever Pop, Romulus Todoran

Signature
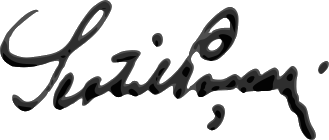

Sextil Iosif Pușcariu (4 January 1877 – 5 May 1948) was an Austro-Hungarian-born Romanian linguist and philologist, also known for his involvement in administrative and party politics. A native of Brașov educated in France and Germany, he was active in Transylvania's cultural life and worked as a Romanian-language professor at Czernowitz in the Duchy of Bukovina. He began his scholarly career in 1906, when he was tasked with compiling a general dictionary of the Romanian language. Interested in a variety of disciplines, Pușcariu published widely and brought new ideas into Romania, as well as overseeing two monumental projects related to the language: advancing his dictionary to the letter "L", and creating an atlas of the language.

As a soldier in the Austro-Hungarian Army during World War I, Pușcariu embraced the creation of Greater Romania at its conclusion, heading the department of foreign affairs in the provisional government representing Bukovina Romanians. He was also the founder of Glasul Bucovinei, a newspaper which helped channel Romanian nationalism in that region, and, with Ion Nistor, oversaw Bukovina's union with Romania in November 1918. Under Romanian rule, he led efforts to create a new university in Cluj, where he also set up a research institute in the same city dedicated to the study of his native language. He promoted interdisciplinary approaches, primarily by attaching a sociological focus to his studies on linguistics.

Though committed to ethnic nationalism and cultural conservatism, Pușcariu embraced Europeanism during his stint at the International Committee on Intellectual Cooperation. He radicalized himself during the 1920s and '30s, first by seeking to impose a Jewish quota at his university, and then by more openly supporting fascist politics. Throughout much of the interval, he chaired the Romanian Orthodox Fraternity, which identified with the mainstream church and sometimes clashed with Transylvanian Greek Catholics. With the onset of World War II, he moved to Berlin, where he led a propaganda institute meant to promote Romanian culture in the German Reich, as well as counter Hungary's justifications for absorbing Northern Transylvania in the wake of the Second Vienna Award in 1940.

Pușcariu raised suspicion from his government employers, who disliked his lavish spending and his continued involvement with the rebellious Iron Guard. He was ultimately pushed to resign in 1943. After his return home, his health deteriorated while the authorities of the new Communist regime initiated legal proceedings. He refused to escape Romania and died at Bran, before he could be sentenced. Pușcariu's work was largely shunned for two decades, and his scholarly legacy was fully revived following the collapse of the regime in 1989.

== Biography ==
=== Origins and early life ===
According to Pușcariu's own research, the family originated in Maramureș, spending time in Moldavia before ending up in southern Transylvania. Named Iuga in Maramureș, their surname was then Pușcașu, reportedly an occupational surname marking their hunting skills (from pușcaș, meaning "shooter"), before the final form was selected at the suggestion of Bishop Ioan Lemeni (served 1833–1850). In the latter part of the 18th century, one Iuga Pușcașu left Țara Făgărașului and arrived at Sohodol village near Bran; it was from two of his sons that the prominent family was descended. Sextil's grandfather Ioan Pușcașu, a priest from Sohodol, had five sons and five daughters, providing all of them a rigorous education. One son was Ioan Pușcariu, who became a noted jurist and historian, while another, Ilarion, left his mark as a theologian. Sextil's cousins included Emil, a surgeon, who married a sister of the literary historian Ovid Densusianu.

Sextil's father Iosif (1835–1923) studied at the Transylvanian Saxon high school in Brașov (known then as Brassó and Kronstadt) before being sent to learn Theology in Sibiu. Metropolitan Andrei Șaguna observed that Iosif lacked a priestly vocation and gave him permission to leave the seminary in order to study Law. After graduating from the Saxon Law Academy, where he published a humor newsletter, the elder Pușcariu served as a judge in Zărnești from 1848 to 1867, running his courtroom in Romanian. Upon marrying Eufrosina Ciurcu, who came from a merchant family, he moved to Brașov to work as a lawyer. Applying his literary talent, he founded Cocoșul Roșu, a humor magazine, editing it between 1874 and 1878 and in 1881.

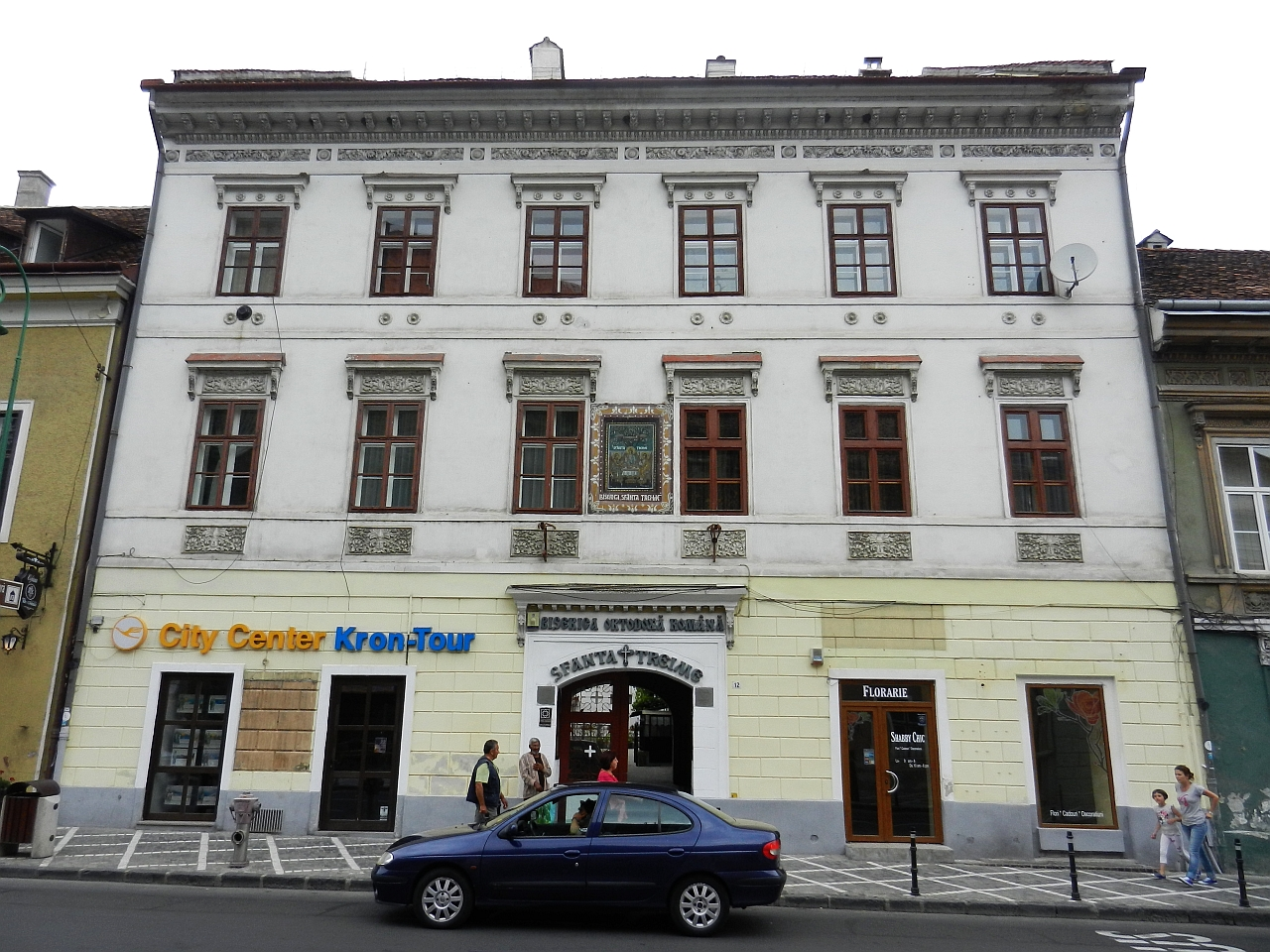
Pușcariu's Brașov house

Born in Brașov as Iosif and Eufosina's sixth son, Sextil Iosif Pușcariu would later have two more brothers and a sister. He attended the Romanian high school in his native city, where he picked up Latin and history from teacher Vasile Goldiș, before going to Germany and France for his undergraduate and doctoral degrees. Trained in the spirit of Positivism, he was one of the first Romanian scholars to make a transition from philology to methodical linguistics. At the University of Paris, between 1899 and 1901, he studied under Gaston Paris, while his doctoral adviser at Leipzig University was Gustav Weigand. Weigand introduced him to a Dutch female student of Romanian, whom Pușcariu would later describe as his first love. He also studied at the University of Vienna, teaching there in 1904.

As a political journalist, Pușcariu joined the informal group, formed around Octavian Goga, Octavian Codru Tăslăuanu, and Ghiță Pop, and known as tinerii oțeliți ("inuered youth"). The main focus of their criticism was the more conservative Romanian National Party (PNR). Through 1901, Pușcariu's writings regularly appeared in Gazeta de Transilvania. He also made important contributions to Luceafărul, headed by Tăslăuanu (whom he had befriended as a schoolmate in Brașov), while it appeared both in Budapest and, after 1906, in Sibiu. In 1902, he was elected a corresponding member of ASTRA's literary section. During the remainder of his life, he undertook activities related to the society, although at varying paces: active that decade in its philological efforts, he found himself largely overtaken by other activities in the 1910s, only to organize a series of conferences starting in the mid-1920s in Transylvania's towns, both large and small.

=== Debut in academia and World War I experience ===
Pușcariu made frequent crossings into the Kingdom of Romania (the "Old Kingdom", in later reference). He was elected a corresponding member of the Romanian Academy in 1906, becoming a titular member in 1914. He also became one of several Transylvanian affiliates of Sămănătorul, the Romanian traditionalist and ethnic nationalist review in Bucharest, finding his ideas on linguistics and history challenged by Densusianu and Ion Aurel Candrea. Pușcariu's scholarly work was featured in the mainstream review Convorbiri Literare, signaling the latter's own transition toward Sămănătorist nationalism.

While at Leipzig, he came into contact with Wilhelm Meyer-Lübke, under whom he began his university career and who offered him a post at the University of Fribourg. Pușcariu declined, citing a wish to be closer to the Romanian lands. In 1903 Pușcariu began courting Leonora Maria Dima. In keeping up with the Pușcariu family tradition, which favored consanguine marriage, she was his mother's grandniece. Leonora had studied music in Brașov; her father, a mathematics teacher at Pușcariu's high school, was the elder brother of composer Gheorghe Dima. They were married on 5 September 1905, selecting academics Ion Bianu and Virgil Cioflec as their godfathers. Leonora's dowry included a villa in Bran, which became Sextil's favorite residence. The Pușcarius went on to have three children. At various later junctions, Sextil looked back on his conjugal life as having greatly improved his life, for being a "perfect union of souls".

In 1906, following earlier attempts by August Treboniu Laurian, I. C. Massim, Bogdan Petriceicu Hasdeu, and Alexandru Philippide, the Romanian Academy assigned Pușcariu the task of writing a Dictionary of the Romanian Language, with the latter two personally giving him their notes. Pușcariu took on the challenge at a difficult time: Romania's aging King, Carol I, had asked Philippide to remove all entries for neologisms, causing the latter to resign in protest. Pușcariu taught Romanian language and literature at Czernowitz University in the Duchy of Bukovina from 1906. He replaced the retiring Ion G. Sbiera, and eventually rose to become dean of the Literature and Philosophy Faculty. This period saw him forming a close bond with philologist Alexe Procopovici and historian Ion Nistor. In September 1911, he visited the University of Iași, in Romania, alongside Mathias Friedwagner; he forged a friendship with A. C. Cuza, the jurist and anti-Semitic doctrinaire.

While in Czernowitz (Romanian name: Cernăuți), Pușcariu refused the chance to teach at Vienna, as he would not have been able to lecture in Romanian, at the same time declaring his adherence to Pan-Germanism. The outbreak of World War I caught Pușcariu in Techirghiol, Romania. A reserve officer in the Austro-Hungarian Army, and overall an Austrian patriot, he rushed back to be mobilized in Brașov, and was later ordered to Cisnădie. In September 1914, after a liturgical music concert in the Sibiu Lutheran Cathedral, he met Onisifor Ghibu, whom he had known since 1905, and who records the deep concern the ongoing conflict was causing Pușcariu. Subsequently, Pușcariu was stationed on the Italian Front. There, his sentiments of loyalty toward the Empire conflicted with the Italophilia he felt toward a country whose inhabitants he saw as the natural allies of the Romanians, a fellow Latin people. Czernowitz, the site of his residence, where he kept his manuscripts and materials, fell to the Imperial Russian Army in the first half of the war. From February to June 1916, he was intermittently hospitalized for eye problems, first at Trieste, where he met Iuliu Maniu, and later at Innsbruck, followed by Brașov.

When the Romanian Kingdom entered the war in August 1916, on the side of the Triple Entente, he was either at home on leave or at the front, but in either case continued his research. Nevertheless, the situation forced him to interrupt work on the Dictionary of the Romanian Language he had started in 1906. The following January, he began keeping a diary, writing fairly regular entries until his wife's death in 1944. While on the front in early 1918 dealing with military accounting and supplies, he worked on a glossary of the Istro-Romanian language. His older brother, engineer Anton Pușcariu, escaped Austria-Hungary and joined the Romanian Army, dying of typhus at the garrison of Bacău in 1917.

=== Bukovina's unification ===
Dispute over the Duchy of Bukovina in 1918. In blue, territories claimed by the West Ukrainian People's Republic, and partly held by the Ukrainian Galician Army. Red line shows territories initially claimed by the Kingdom of Romania in 1916; arrows mark the route taken by Iacob Zadig's expeditionary force

By October 1918, Pușcariu had regained Bukovina, joining the Romanian nationalist caucus forming in that region. As reported by eyewitness Teodor Bălan, his presence there was a "great fortune" for Romanian groups, since Pușcariu indicated the "straight path ahead" for his conationals. On 12 October, he founded the newspaper Glasul Bucovinei, which had as its limited initial goal the protection of rights for the province's Romanians, who formed an overall minority of the local population. However, Glasul also preserved a hidden agenda, namely: "to shatter the respect and fear inspired by the Austrian Empire and to militate for the ideal of pan-Romanian unification." Events quickly evolved, and Pușcariu served as a vice president of the Romanian National Council (CNR) that worked for the union of Bukovina with Romania. This initiative pitted Pușcariu against the loyalist Aurel Onciul, who vetoed all projects for Bukovina's merger with Romania.

Pușcariu was also co-opted by the General Congress of Bukovina, a CNR body which claimed to be the provisional parliament of Bukovina, in opposition to the Ukrainian assembly; from 27 October 1918, he served on its foreign policy committee, alongside Alexandru Hurmuzachi and Gheorghe Grigorovici. On 9 November, he helped Ilie Lazăr organize armed resistance to the Ukrainian Galician Army, which had occupied Czernowitz. These irregulars held their ground until the arrival of Romanian regulars under Iacob Zadig on 11 November. One day later, Pușcariu, who relinquished his General Congress seat, was sworn in as secretary of state for foreign affairs, under President Iancu Flondor, serving in this capacity to 18 December, when the cabinet transferred powers to a regular Romanian administration. On 17 November, he left on official mission to Iași, addressing thanks for Zadig's intervention. It was here that, on 22 November, he resumed contacts with Nistor, head of the Romanian Mission in Bukovina, with whom he reached an agreement on the recognition of the union. He networked with Romanian nationalists in both Transylvania and the Moldavian Democratic Republic (or Bessarabia). He advised the former "never to reach a compromise with the Hungarians", while announcing the latter that Bukovina had become a Romanian province.

Pușcariu also met Romanian Premier Ion I. C. Brătianu, who advised him to push ahead with the union, noting that unification needed to be demanded and enacted without waiting on international arbitration. Pușcariu reports that all of Brătianu's decisions on this issue were pre-approved by a bedridden Alexandru C. Constantinescu. Pușcariu and Nistor traveled back to Czernowitz, then known as Cernăuți, where Nistor joined the CNR and drafted the act of union. This document was in fact co-written by Duca and Constantinescu and Ion G. Duca—as Duca himself testified in his memoirs.

During his absence, Glasul Bucovinei was reorganized into an official daily of the CNR, with Pușcariu as manager. After this recognition, he worked very closely with Nistor, helping him organize the radically nationalistic Democratic Unionist group from a base of Glasul intellectuals. However, he was himself inactive politically, and later stated that he had grown disillusioned with politics. He remained more involved in literary matters. In January 1919, writing in Glasul, Pușcariu penned a strongly positive review of Poemele luminii, the debut volume by Transylvania's Lucian Blaga, helping launch his career. Transylvania united with Romania on 1 December 1918, but Pușcariu was unable to attend the festivities at Alba Iulia, being sick in bed with a case of influenza he had caught at Iași. Disease had also prevented him from welcoming in Cernăuți a Bessarabian unionist delegation on 28 November.

=== University administrator and antisemitic campaign ===
Following these events, which marked the culmination of Greater Romania's creation, Pușcariu could return to Transylvania, being named as the first rector of the Superior Dacia University in Cluj. A Franz Joseph University already existed in the city, but its Hungarian faculty departed as a bloc and an entirely new professorial corps and administrative structure were required. The revamped university had two founders, the idealistic Ghibu and the more practical Pușcariu. Chosen by the Directing Council, Transylvania's provisional government, the latter headed a twenty-man committee charged with the seemingly insurmountable task of setting up four faculties (Literature and Philosophy, Medicine, Science, Law) and recruiting professors within a few months. As a native Transylvanian, Pușcariu was familiar with the Austro-Hungarian milieu; he also had relations with academics in Western Europe and was close to a number of figures in the Old Kingdom, especially Nicolae Iorga. Set up in July 1919, the committee included twelve professors from the Universities of Iași and Bucharest, and eight Transylvanians.

At the time, Pușcariu recommended that intellectuals in Bukovina and Transylvania steer away from any involvement in the Old Kingdom's party politics. Despite pressures from the PNR, he announced a strictly apolitical hiring process, only making an exception for Maniu's brother Cassiu, a law professor he found "slightly ridiculous, but friendly and discreet". The new professors were mainly young, but also included a contingent of established Old Kingdom academics and Romanians working abroad, as well as foreign scholars. Pușcariu had insisted his formal appointment come from within the university rather than the government, which allowed him to deny Iași and Bucharest a greater say in the proceedings. He also advocated against extending to Cluj the same set of laws that governed the Old Kingdom institutions, as he found them unsatisfactory; the laws were not applied uniformly until 1925. Notably, Pușcariu hired Gheorghe Bogdan-Duică over Eugen Lovinescu; the former was, in addition to being a Transylvanian and a scholar of some local renown, Iorga's brother-in-law. It was Pușcariu's idea to bring in foreign academics, mainly from France, including geographer Emmanuel de Martonne, who drew Romania's expanded borders at the Paris Peace Conference; and Jules Guyart of the University of Lyon, who became the medical faculty's first head. Courses began in November 1919, with a grand opening held the following February. Cluj had suddenly become a visible European academic center. Pușcariu left the rectorate in 1920.

Although he had joined the Freemasonry, Pușcariu remained committed to his identity as a member of the Romanian Orthodox Church; he stood out among his generation for fusing the national and religious identity into a culturally conservative mold. In his Romanian literature history tract of 1921 (Istoria literaturii române. Epoca veche), he concluded that "our Orthodoxism was the most significant event when it came to our cultural development". This, he noted at the time, had both positive and negative effects: Romanians were absent from the Renaissance, but were also free to develop their own culture, one of "measure and harmony". The work was critical of monasticism, especially as embodied in the Catholic Church, alleging that "monasteries have always fostered internationalism". Istoria literaturii..., "very popular with students and men of culture", and heavily influenced by Iorga, made a point of discovering or reclaiming early contributions to fine writing in the medieval principalities. According to literary historian Eugen Negrici, this effort was unconvincing: "The aesthetic gamble is a meek one, and [Pușcariu's] critical insights and interpretative newness are both frail. [...] However, the imposing illustrations and the openness [...] toward other forms of ancient art (architecture, painting, embroidery, miniatures, etc.) are not without consequences. Such rich and motley environs become a resonance box for the hardly perceptible sound of an actual literature. We may now fool ourselves that this literature is one of force and consistency".

An antisemitic campaign swept Romanian universities in the wake of World War I. In this context, at the time the 1920–1921 school year opened, Pușcariu expressed his concern that Jews were disproportionately represented in the Medicine and Law faculties. He suggested they congregated toward those subjects because of surer and more profitable career prospects, given the lack of doctors, administrators and magistrates in Romania's newly acquired provinces. A Jewish quota was enacted in the Kingdom of Hungary in September 1920, leading to a surge in Hungarian Jewish enrollment at Cluj. Prompted by the medical faculty's leadership, the university senate discussed introduction of a similar policy. In early 1921, students, later joined by cultural figures, began demanding that sociologist Eugen Ehrlich be fired from his professorship at Cernăuți. Ehrlich was a Jew who had converted to Catholicism, but the primary motivating factor in his firing appears to have been a campaign to fill teaching posts with ethnic Romanians. Ehrlich, who was rector in 1906–1907, had been instrumental in Pușcariu's being hired at the university. However, no one intervened on his behalf; not even Pușcariu tried to stop his benefactor's dismissal.

By 1922–1923, as a nationalist, anti-democratic and antisemitic student movement centered around Corneliu Zelea Codreanu gained ascendancy, he was not at the forefront of its radical promoters, but rather figured among a group of moderate, respectable academic supporters who countenanced the agitators and lent them an air of general acceptance. In March 1923, he wrote an article applauding the 15,000 student movement participants; praising the cohesion they showed, rare for Romania, he claimed they represented "a healthy and spontaneous reaction of the national preservation instinct". Addressing students from Bukovina, he called the Jewish quota something all those who wished the country well would endorse, for "in our country [which we] gained with so many sacrifices, we no longer have air to breathe; the invasion of the foreign element stifles us, chokes us".

=== Museum of the Romanian Language ===
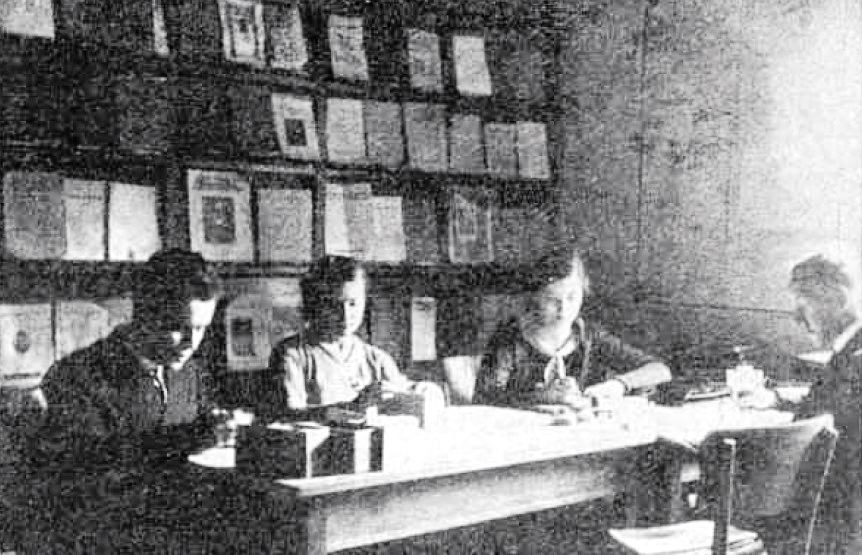
Students working at the Museum of the Romanian Language, 1930

Between 1922 and 1926, Pușcariu served as part of Romania's delegation to the League of Nations. This allowed him to leave the country regularly, and also cemented his friendship with diplomat Nicolae Titulescu, whom Pușcariu called "charming". Together, they defended the Romanian cause against property claims made in Transylvania by Hungarian citizens. In 1923, Pușcariu also helped art historian George Oprescu take office art the International Committee on Intellectual Cooperation, of which he himself was a member. The following year, Pușcariu put out Cultura magazine from Cluj. It enshrined his affiliation to Europeanism and support for the League of Nations.

From around 1922, Pușcariu approached various intellectuals and politicians with the goal of creating new institutions for the preservation of cultural identity. With Vintilă Brătianu and Nistor, he set up the Brătianu Foundation, which financed a network of summer schools for adult education. With Iorga's assistance, Pușcariu established the Museum of the Romanian Language, a research institute he had conceived in early 1917, while on the front. The large group of collaborators and students who advanced the language as an academic discipline came to be known as the Cluj School of linguistics. Rather than confine himself to a narrow field, Pușcariu incorporated linguistics, history, sociology and even literature into his studies, constantly referring to research in other disciplines. For instance, in 1927 he penned articles recording how the Romanian War of Independence impacted Transylvanian society, as well as an overview of Hungarian borrowings in Romanian, which saw print in Pásztortűz.

Pușcariu introduced Romanian linguistics to the theories of Meyer-Lübke, particularly as they related to the form of Latin that underpins the language; to Matteo Bartoli's ideas about the isolated and peripheral position of the language; and to Jules Gilliéron's dialectological notions. In terms of Romanian scholars, he incorporated the archaeological findings of Vasile Pârvan, as well as the sociological and folkloric studies of Simion Mehedinți and Romulus Vuia. His respect for their opinions led him to draw upon the work of Densusianu, Candrea, Constantin C. Giurescu, Iorgu Iordan, Alexandru Rosetti, Alexandru Graur, and others. He had over eight hundred articles and numerous books to his name. In 1930, he helped organize a Folklore Archive within the museum building; led by Ion Mușlea, this was the country's first institution dedicated exclusively to the study of its folklore tradition.

The museum, associated with the University of Cluj (soon renamed after King Ferdinand I), had as its goals the spread of popular interest in studying and cultivating the Romanian language, the training of Romanian philologists and the publication of monographs, special dictionaries, glossaries and bibliographies. The museum ended up being the nerve center of the great dictionary project, resumed from the 1906 attempts; this project was headed by Constantin Lacea and Theodor Capidan, who in turn were assisted by numerous other linguists in different stages. Lexical and etymological notes were presented in weekly meetings and later published in the museum's Dacoromania magazine, and in this way, practically all active members of the museum contributed to the Dictionary. Pușcariu and his team worked for 43 years, until 1948, completing some 60,000 definitions across over 3,000 pages covering up to the letter "L".

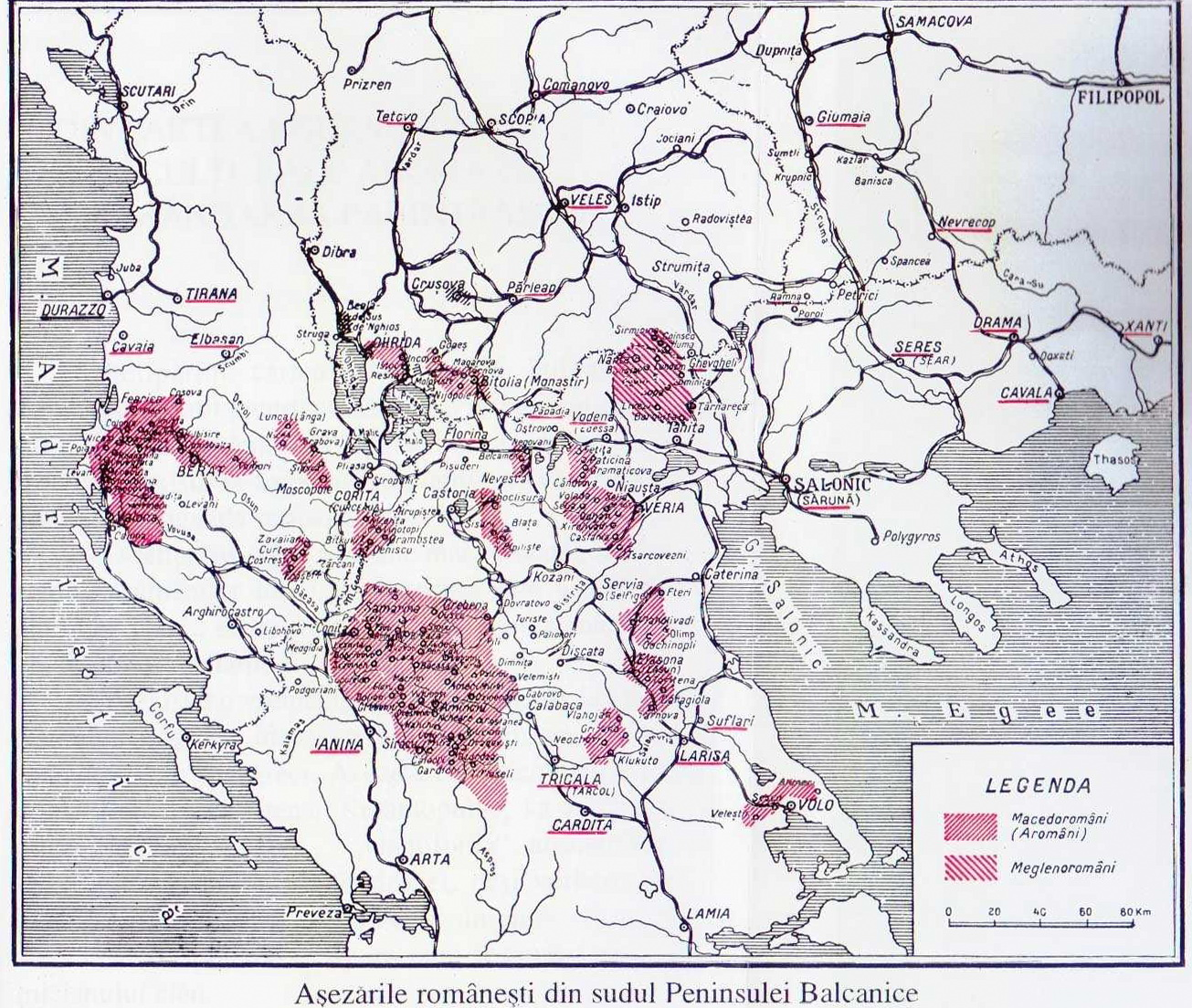
Map from the Romanian Linguistic Atlas, showing Aromanian and Megleno-Romanian communities in Greece and Albania

The museum's second great project was a Romanian Linguistic Atlas, conceived and led by Pușcariu but principally executed by two of his associates, Sever Pop and Emil Petrovici. The pair prepared fieldwork in 398 localities, undertook the work between 1930 and 1938, thereafter drawing the maps. By 1943, there had appeared four volumes encompassing Pop's research and three from Petrovici, as well as a volume on dialect texts. Finally, Dacoromania appeared from 1921 to 1948, in eleven enormous volumes totaling some 9,000 pages. The magazine contained studies, articles, notes and reviews, mainly on linguistics (lexicology, dialectology, linguistic geography, language history, onomastics, general linguistics, grammar, phonetics and phonology) and philology, as well as research on history and literary criticism, cultural history and folklore. Each edition included a bibliography that systematically recorded writings on linguistics, philology, folklore, ethnography and literature, connected to Romanian language, culture and literature, both domestically and abroad.

Three generations of scholars worked on the magazine, with most articles presented at weekly meetings. Pușcariu, in an obituary for Nicolae Drăganu, commented on these sessions' usefulness, noting how the members would benefit from constructive criticism, "sometimes pointed, mainly intelligent, but never bitter, for the critical spirit never originated from a pleasure to destroy, but from a desire to complete, while the joy in another's discovery was always greater than the temptation to persist in a mistake". Despite remaining "enthralled by Latin elements" in onomastics, Pușcariu announced in Dacoromania his conclusion that no Romanian surname had been traced back to a Roman source, contradicting Philippide in this respect. More controversially, the journal segregated its contributors into income classes: while most received fees of 150 lei, Iorga's articles would fetch some 1,000 per page. The institution also provided stable employment to Pușcariu family members, including daughter Lia, daughter-in-law Maria, and nephew Vasile Bologa.

=== FOR and Iron Guard ===
By 1931, Lia Pușcariu had married Grigore Manoilescu, brother of the influential ideologue, Mihail Manoilescu. Encouraged by his Manoilescu in-laws, Pușcariu was briefly a sympathizer of Iorga's Democratic Nationalist Party, and spent some time as director of its regional mouthpiece, Drumul Nou. He is also credited as the newspaper's founder, while schoolteacher Ioan Costea was its editor. The circle he created around him was noted for enthusiastically supporting Romania's authoritarian King, Carol II. Pușcariu also attempted to go into national politics as a university representative in the Senate of Romania. He presented himself in the June 1931 election, but lost to the more popular Nicolae Bănescu; this conflict prolonged itself into a local scandal, with Pușcariu accusing Bănescu of opportunism. Pușcariu had another row with historian Alexandru Lapedatu, whom he challenged to a duel with swords in October 1931. That outcome was eventually averted when they agreed to reconcile. In tandem, Pușcariu was becoming critical of Iorga's behavior—already in 1923, he complained that his former mentor was "dictatorial".

In keeping with his Orthodoxist agenda, Pușcariu also helped Nicolae Ivan set up the Romanian Orthodox Fraternity (FOR), which, as noted by historian Lucian Nastasă, was under the influence of far-right groups. It existed as a counterpart and rival of AGRU, a lay organization for the Transylvanian Greek Catholic Church. Allegedly, in 1934 he gave orders to boycott public ceremonies marking AGRU's anniversary, though he allowed his colleagues to attend those events where Carol II was also present. Pușcariu served as FOR president from March 1933 to 1939, and hosting its celebratory Congress in October 1935. Around that date, the FOR intervened in trilateral negotiations between Romania, Hungary, and the Holy See, asking for the Concordat of 1932 to be annulled, and demanding that Hungary immediately hand over Emanoil Gojdu's estate. At another Congress, in 1937, he repeated the claim that "our Orthodoxy is our only criterion for differentiation, for we are the only Latin people of the Orthodox faith". His anti-Catholic rhetoric was particularly strong, forcing government to apologize for tolerating the display.

Immersing himself in the cultural politics of Transylvania, Pușcariu resumed his links with ASTRA, attending its most notorious congress, held in September 1934 at Târgu Mureș. It was here that he presented his paper on "literary perspectives of the era". While his work again took him away from ASTRA in the 1940s, it was to its Brașov chapter's president that he sent the manuscript of his history of the city in 1947. In March 1933, Pușcariu's work was being assessed by government officials in Fascist Italy. This followed suggestions made by historian Francesco Salata, who wanted Pușcariu to receive an Italian state decoration, and who noted that Bartoli had been similarly honored in Romania. The proposal was dropped when it became clear that Pușcariu was opposing Hungarian revisionism, while Italy condoned it.

During the mid 1930s, Pușcariu became a manifest supporter of Codreanu's semi-legal fascist movement, the Iron Guard (or "Legionary Movement"). Records tend to show that he did not formally register with the Guard itself, although his name appears among the card-carrying members of the Guard's political front, the "Everything for the Country" party. He also signed his name to a list of intellectuals who "believed in Legionary victory". On the occasion, he noted that the Guard had been the surest way of countering a "Jewish movement" at university, but also professed his admiration for Codreanu's "sincere religiosity" and "virtue". Pușcariu was additionally noted for his eulogy upon the deaths of Ion Moța and Vasile Marin, Guardist volunteers among the Spanish Nationalists. He depicted himself as a pious and old supplicant at their grave, and expressed gratitude that a "new spirit sweeps over our country." A contributor to the Guardist magazine, Buna Vestire, he added his voice to the campaign against modernist literature and "Jewish influence" in Romanian letters. The Nazi German consul in Cluj noted that Pușcariu's "decidedly right-wing orientation" may have prevented his obtaining the rectorate or even a post in the academic senate at the latest university elections.

Under the authoritarian regime established by Carol as the "National Renaissance Front", Romania felt the mounting pressure of Hungarian revisionism. During the FOR rally in November 1937, Pușcariu praised the king for building a chain of forts in Bihor County, on Romania's border with Hungary. At the time, he argued that the Diocese of Oradea was similarly serving as bulwark against foreign infiltration. At the next congress, in November 1938, Pușcariu ordered a toning-down of anti-Catholicism. In a resolution adopted by the group, reference was made to "racial cohesion" between the Greek Catholics and the Orthodox, while still calling on the former to embrace Orthodoxy.

=== Berlin institute ===
A year into World War II, Hungarian territorial demands received backing from Germany, limiting Romania's choices. In August 1940, Pușcariu attended a crisis meeting of Transylvanian notabilities. He took a conciliatory position, supporting a voluntary exchange of territories with Hungary. Following the Nazi-mediated Second Vienna Award, a large area, defined as "Northern Transylvania", was re-annexed by Hungary. The political crisis originating from this event also had the unlikely consequence of bringing the Iron Guard to power, producing the "National Legionary State". Slightly earlier, in August 1940, Pușcariu had proposed the founding of the Berlin-headquartered Romanian Institute in Germany, becoming its first president and serving until 1943. The purpose of this body was to counter Hungarian propaganda, particularly as related to Northern Transylvania.

Pușcariu, who made generous financial contributions to the Guard's coffers, based his hiring at the institute on whether applicants belonged to the movement, and according to one of his employees there, was a member of the Guard's senate. Grigore Manoilescu, who had returned to politics as an Iron Guard figure, became the institute's director; Maximilian Hacman, former rector at Cernăuți, was an old friend; among the younger hires was Constantin Noica. The order for establishing the institute came on 16 August—still during the National Renaissance Front regime—from the Foreign Ministry, led by Mihail Manoilescu. Meanwhile, Pușcariu, as a symbol of continuity, was offered a renewed mandate as rector of the University of Cluj, which had moved to Sibiu due to the Vienna Award; he accepted and took office in October. Upon relocating to Berlin, he delegated his powers to his ally Procopovici, and later to Iuliu Hațieganu.

Pușcariu's institute was headquartered in a 26-room building in western Berlin, endowed with furniture of the highest quality ordered by Pușcariu and hosting large receptions attended by politicians and cultural figures. For instance, Education Minister Bernhard Rust paid a visit lasting over six hours in July 1942. Pușcariu held forth on the topic of Romanians' continuous presence in the Danubian space, particularly in Transylvania, and according to an internal memorandum, the visit ended with "exceptionally cordial" remarks toward his country. Pușcariu, in writings and interviews, made flattering remarks about the Nazi regime, calling it "a new chapter in world history" and "a new world, a new era in the life of the German state". Nazi Party figures were invited to receptions, including one in 1941 to commemorate Moța and Marin.

Meanwhile, Pușcariu undertook to spread knowledge of Romania and its culture in Germany. The institute was subordinate to the Romanian Propaganda Ministry, and as early as 1931, Pușcariu had written an article expressing his concern at the fact that Romania's external propaganda was much weaker than that of its neighbors. He sought to have Romanian works staged in Germany, succeeding, for instance, in having Sabin Drăgoi's opera Năpasta and George Ciprian's play The Man and His Mule presented in Elbing in late 1942. In 1940, it was known that Romania did not enjoy a very positive image in Germany, with the country's consul in Cologne noting that its inhabitants were seen as "gypsies or at best Balkan people, with very primitive habits". Pușcariu attempted to change this through numerous articles appearing in speciality publications that he was able to have printed due to his connections in Germany. The propaganda books and articles that came out under Pușcariu's supervision intended to show Germans that Romanians were an Aryan people, that Romania deserved to win back its lost territories thanks to its alliance with Germany, that Russians were a communist people desiring to use Bessarabia as a beachhead to attack the rest of Europe, while Romanians had been anti-communist since the Hungarian–Romanian War began in 1918 and viewed the disputed province as a line of defense.

He made similar arguments in Basarabia, an ample 1941 article in Revista Fundațiilor Regale journal that chronicled the province's history from antiquity until its return to Romania during Operation Barbarossa. Expounding on what he saw as Imperial Russian neglect and contempt for the Bessarabia Governorate, he contrasted this with "the land rendered arable by the hard-working arms" of Romanians. Pușcariu also brought up the 271 AD withdrawal of the Roman army into Dacia Ripensis, which left the agricultural population of Roman Dacia vulnerable to barbarian attack, comparing it with the previous year's departure of the Romanian Army from Bessarabia and subsequent Soviet occupation. He suggested that the 3rd century barbarians were "surely not more inhuman than the Bolsheviks who overran Bessarabia in 1940". As an old adherent of Sămănătorism, Pușcariu strongly promoted the peasant as a symbol of Romanianism. He disseminated photographs of ordinary people from Bukovina, made unrealized plans for books on Romanian art and investigated the possibility of founding or reactivating Romanian language programs at a number of leading German universities. For his activities, he was awarded the Order of the German Eagle.

By 1940, Pușcariu's public offices and various job benefits afforded him a comfortable lifestyle; he collected some 62,000 lei in regular payments from his work in Romania, and an "undisclosed" salary for his activities abroad. However, his work there soon became the focus of investigation, particularly after the Legionnaires' rebellion, which resulted in the Iron Guard's removal from power in early 1941. As early as October 1940, the Education and Culture Ministries had noted Pușcariu's "dictatorial" powers in hiring personnel, but were overruled by General Ion Antonescu, the country's Conducător, in December. The following February, financial issues appeared, with an investigation sought by Mihai Antonescu into the reportedly exorbitant sums being spent by the institute. Pușcariu ended up losing his rector's position at Sibiu and was accused of carrying on a months' long campaign against Ion Antonescu following the Guard's ouster. He often expressed the view that Heinrich Himmler would install the Guard back in power, and that the latter would then depose Antonescu.

After an audit in 1941–1942, the institute received just over a third of the 15 million lei budgeted; a half for 1942–1943; but zero of the 10 million in 1943. These moves were due not only to Pușcariu's Guard background, but also to his political maneuvers that raised the question of the institute being shut down. The budget cuts were a signal for him to resign and return to Romania. Although for a time he was able to finance the institute out of his salary at the University of Berlin, as well as—it appears—another, unknown source, he did ultimately depart in mid-1943. Nevertheless, Pușcariu gave formal approval to Antonescu's core policies, including Romania's war on the Eastern Front.

=== Final years ===
A member of the Permanent Committee of Linguists, Pușcariu was admitted to the Saxonian Academy of Sciences and Humanities in 1936 and in 1939 became the second Romanian, after Dimitrie Cantemir, to join the Prussian Academy of Sciences. In addition to his activity as a propagandist, he worked on his definitive tract of sociolinguistics, Limba română ("The Romanian Language"), put out by Editura Fundațiilor Regale. According to philologist Pompiliu Constantinescu, the work exceeded "the narrow bounds of specialization", turning the historical development of language and into the ethnographic "mirror" of Romanian culture and civilization. Limba română, which saw print in 1940, investigated proto-Romanian (designated by Pușcariu under the name of străromână), and spoke of a large Sprachbund comprising all Eastern Romance languages; his theory identifying Istro-Romanian as a Western variety of the language was since corrected by his pupil Petrovici. His views on the topic were also being challenged from 1941 by Alexandru Rosetti, who noted that Aromanian was highly distinct from its point of origin. Other parts of the book broke ground in the professional study of the Romanian lexis, with a phonaesthetic retrospective on the national poet Mihai Eminescu and a sociological analysis of neologisms. It also featured Pușcariu's newer musings on onomastics, recording the influence of popular novels on baptismal names for Romanian girls.

Fleeing aerial bombardments, Pușcariu spent 1944 with his daughter and in-laws in Bran. In August, he heard news of the 1944 Romanian coup d'état and the country's changeover to the Allies. As noted by Maria Pușcariu, the entire family was silent and worried about the future, whereas people in the streets celebrated. In September, the left-leaning Romanian Writers' Society expelled Sextil from its ranks, thus signaling his marginalization. In October, a decree compelled Pușcariu to retire, including from the Museum he had led for a quarter century. The same month, the Communist Party press began targeting Pușcariu for his political affiliations: România Liberă published an article denouncing him as a traitor, while Contemporanul included him on a list of "war criminals not yet on trial", a category also including Ion Petrovici and Gheorghe I. Brătianu. This opened the way to further attacks in the Communist press, where terms such as "fascist" and "enemy of the people" were used to target the linguist.

In September, Leonora died, reportedly of shock from witnessing the arrival of Soviet occupiers and the deportation of German civilians. Deeply affected by this loss, Sextil remained isolated in Bran. In late December, he had a stroke that left him unable to use his right hand and forced him to learn to type with his left. He still found protection from Princess Ileana, who befriended his son Radu. As Ileana recalls in her memoirs, she and surgeon Cornel Cărpinișan managed to exaggerate Pușcariu's medical condition, which prevented the authorities from arresting him; Cărpinișan also obtained a reprieve from a personal friend, the Communist potentate Ion Gheorghe Maurer.

During his remaining three years, Pușcariu continued to be active in writing his memoirs and working on the dictionary project. In January 1948, as the Romanian royal family prepared to leave the country permanently, following the establishment of a Communist regime, he was sent an invitation to leave his residence in Bran and join them in exile. However, he refused, stating he wished to remain in his native country. He had been placed on trial by the new regime but not yet sentenced when he died in Bran on 5 May 1948, of heart failure. Two days later, he was buried in Brașov's Groaveri Cemetery. No special honors were on show, though Lapedatu attended and spoke on behalf of the Academy.

Later that year, Lapedatu was allowed to praising Pușcariu's memory at the Academy's general meeting. The vacant seat was taken up by literary historian George Călinescu, in May 1948. However, in June, Pușcariu was posthumously stripped of his Academy membership, as part of a larger purge of living anti-communists. In November, the self-exiled writer Mircea Eliade still eulogized the deceased, noting: "Almost all the work done in Romanian philology over the last twenty-five years is thanks to him. He organized the University of Cluj, with its admirable Museum of the Romanian Language; he founded Daco-Romania magazine and strove to establish the Folklore Archive. Sextil Pușcariu believed, as did Lucian Blaga's generation, in a major destiny for Romanian spirituality".

== Legacy ==
For the first two decades after his death, linguists largely avoided using Pușcariu's work in their publications. Dumitru Macrea cited him as early as 1956, followed by Romulus Todoran and, later, Emil Petrovici. Challenging Communist censorship, Petrovici also attempted to obtain for the second volume of Limba română to be released for print, and earned endorsement from Alexandru Graur and Iorgu Iordan. At the time, the manuscript had been handed back to the Pușcariu family. Other collaborators, many of them facing their own difficulties with the regime, did not bring up their former mentor; these included Capidan and Lacea, as well as George Giuglea and Silviu Dragomir. In 1959, the latter made oblique references to Pușcariu's treatment of Eastern Romance as a single dialect, highlighting yet again that Aromanian was more distantly related to Romanian.

Work on the dictionary was moved to Bucharest, while the museum and Dacoromania were disbanded. There was a colloquium held about Pușcariu's life at the Brașov County Museum in 1977, to mark the centenary of his birth. His reputation did not fully revive until after the Romanian Revolution of 1989, with his rehabilitation embodied by an international conference held at Cluj-Napoca in 1998. For the community of Romanians living in exile from the communist regime, Pușcariu served as a symbol of refusal to serve the new authorities, and in this spirit, Alphonse Juilland published a series of Cahiers Sextil Pușcariu in Western Europe and in the United States.

Sextil's son Radu (1906–1978) was a noted surgeon; his wife Maria lived to 1999. Lia Pușcariu Manoilescu continued to work as a linguist until her death in 1965, as did her daughter by Manoilescu, Magdalena Vulpe (1936–2003). Vulpe, drawing on manuscripts left in the family vault at Bran, published four volumes of his memoirs: Călare pe două veacuri (1968), Brașovul de altădată (1977), Memorii (1978) and Sextil Pușcariu. Spița unui neam din Ardeal (1998). The Museum of the Romanian Language ultimately evolved into the Romanian Academy's Sextil Pușcariu Institute of Linguistics and Literary History, which has borne his name since 1990. In 2008, some 19 years after the anti-communist uprising, author Gabriel Vasiliu reestablished the Romanian Orthodox Fraternity. There are streets named after Pușcariu in Bran, Cluj-Napoca, Oradea, and Timișoara, as well as a high school in Bran, and his former home in the village center is preserved as a museum.

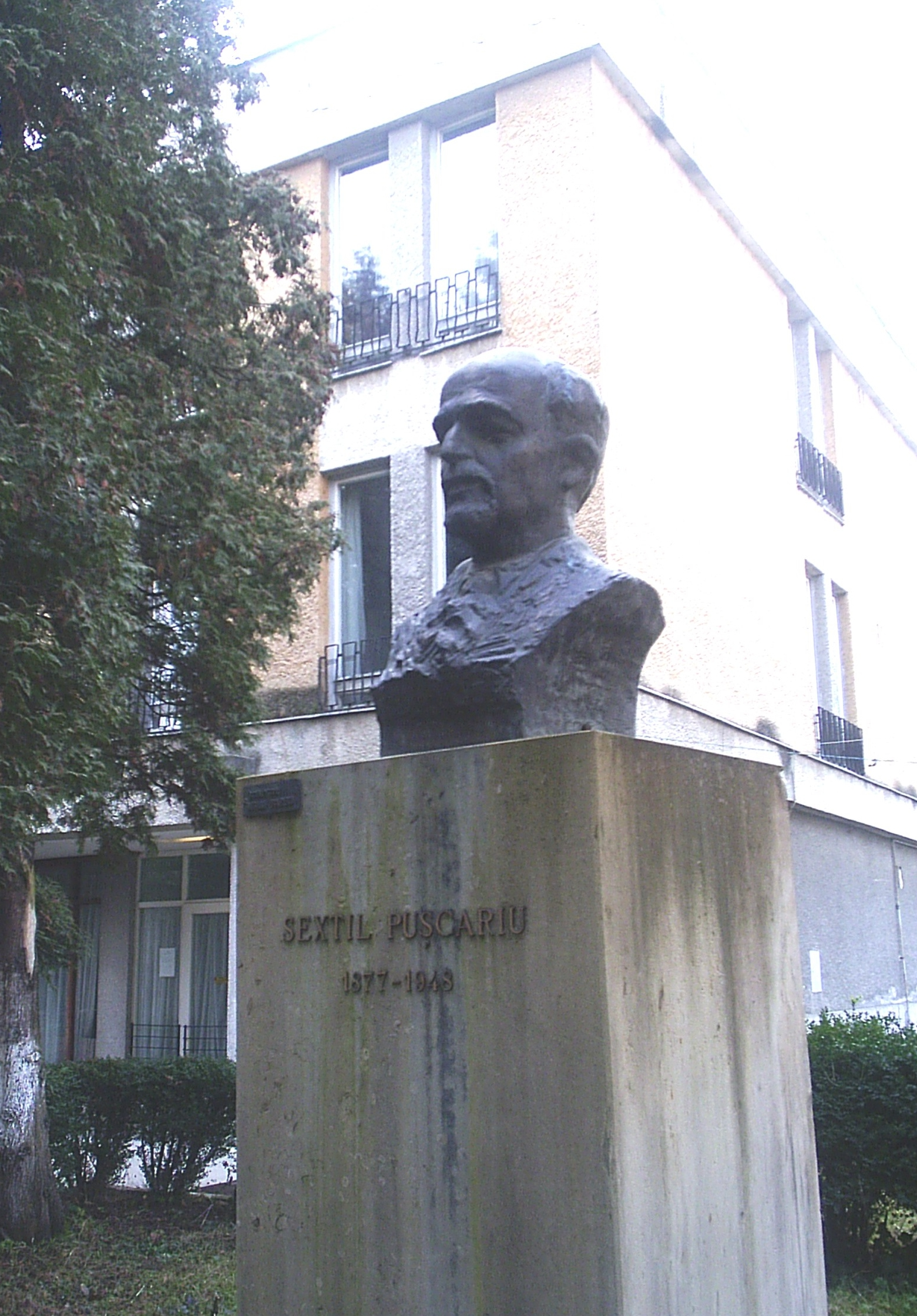
Bust in Cluj-Napoca, on the grounds of the institute he founded

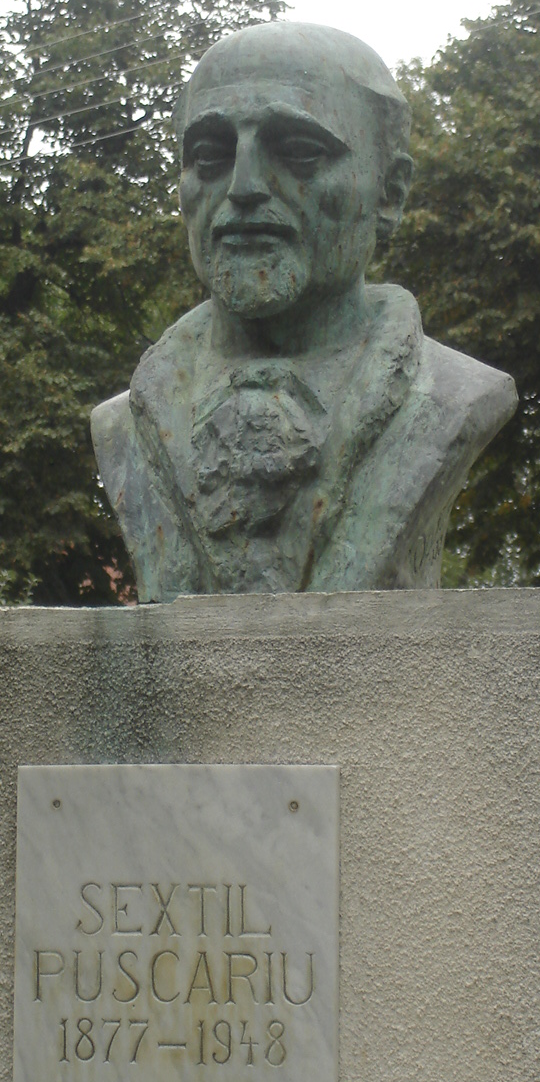
Bust in Bran

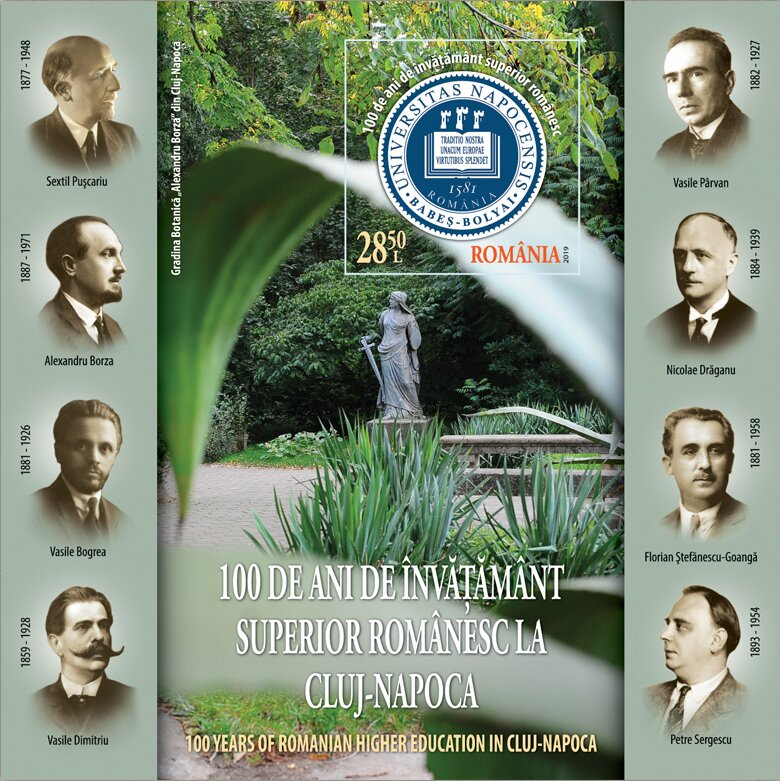
Pușcariu (top left) on a 2019 stamp sheet of Romania
