= Bănița =

- Commune
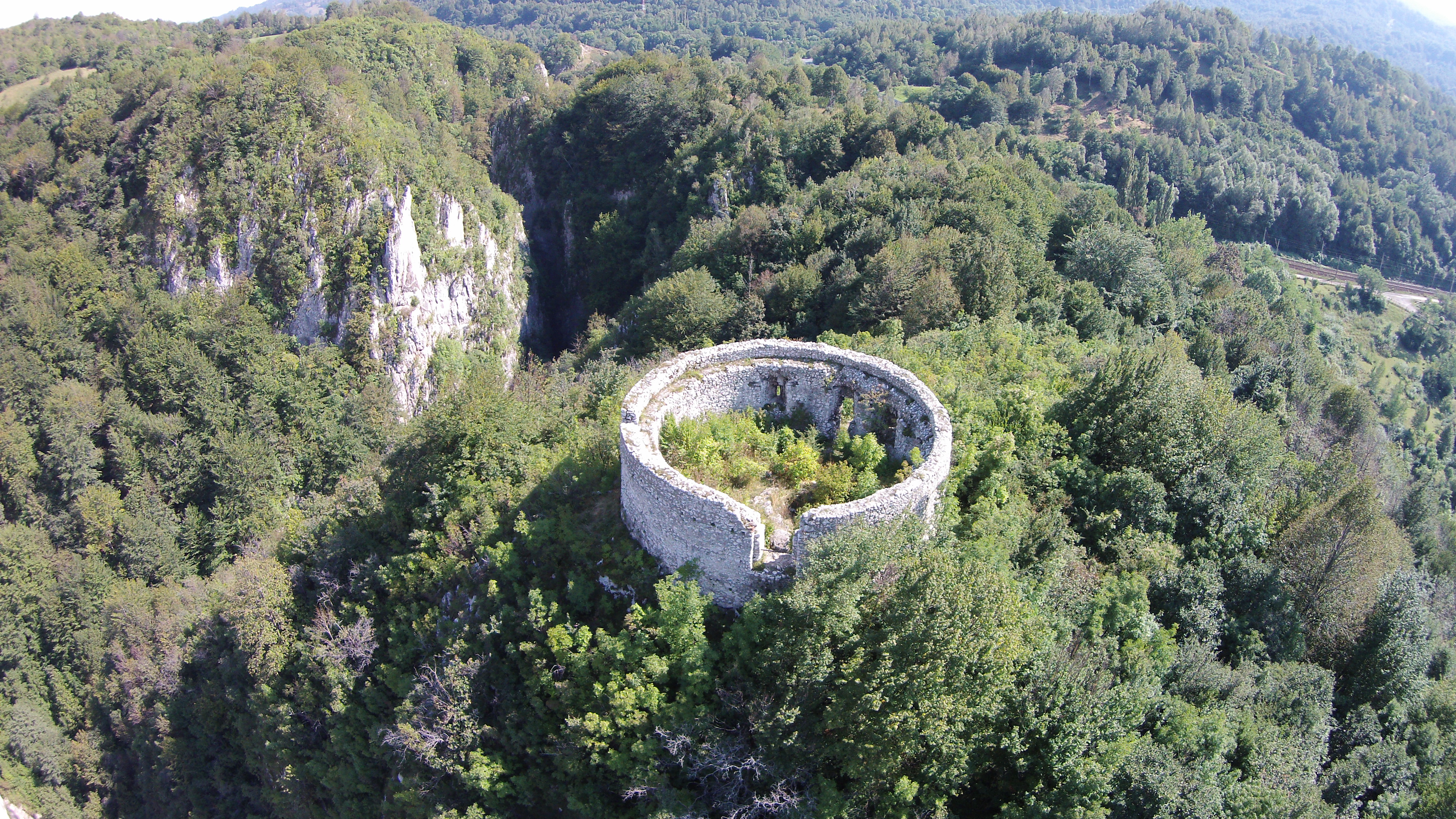
- Ruins of the Crivadia Tower

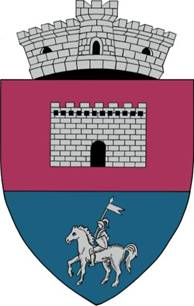
- Coat of arms

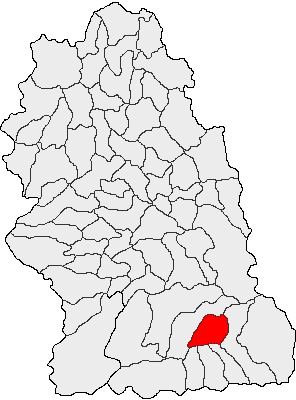
- Location in Hunedoara County

- Location in Romania
- Coordinates: 45°27′N 23°16′E
- Country: Romania
- County: Hunedoara

Government
  - Mayor (2024–2028): Petru Dorin Marc (PRO)
- Area: 78.61 km^{2} (30.35 sq mi)
- Elevation: 731 m (2,398 ft)
- Population (2021-12-01): 1,092
  - Density: 13.89/km^{2} (35.98/sq mi)
- Time zone: UTC+02:00 (EET)
  - Summer (DST): UTC+03:00 (EEST)
- Postal code: 337065
- Area code: (+40) 02 54
- Vehicle reg.: HD
- Website: banita.ro

Bănița (Hungarian: Banica, German: Bansdorf) is a commune in Hunedoara County, Transylvania, Romania. It is composed of three villages: Bănița, Crivadia (Krivádia), and Merișor (Merisor).

The Grădiștea Muncelului-Cioclovina Natural Park is partly located on the territory of the commune.

Historical population
Year	Pop.	±%
1850	1,044	—
1966	2,013	+92.8%
2002	1,363	−32.3%
2011	1,211	−11.2%
2021	1,092	−9.8%
Source: Census data

At the 2021 census, the commune had a population of 1,092, of which 94.51% were Romanians.

== Natives ==
- Zoltán Kemény (1907–1965), sculptor

== See also ==
- Crivadiatherium
- Dacian fortress of Bănița
- Merișor derailment
