= Zoltán Kemény =

Hungarian sculptor

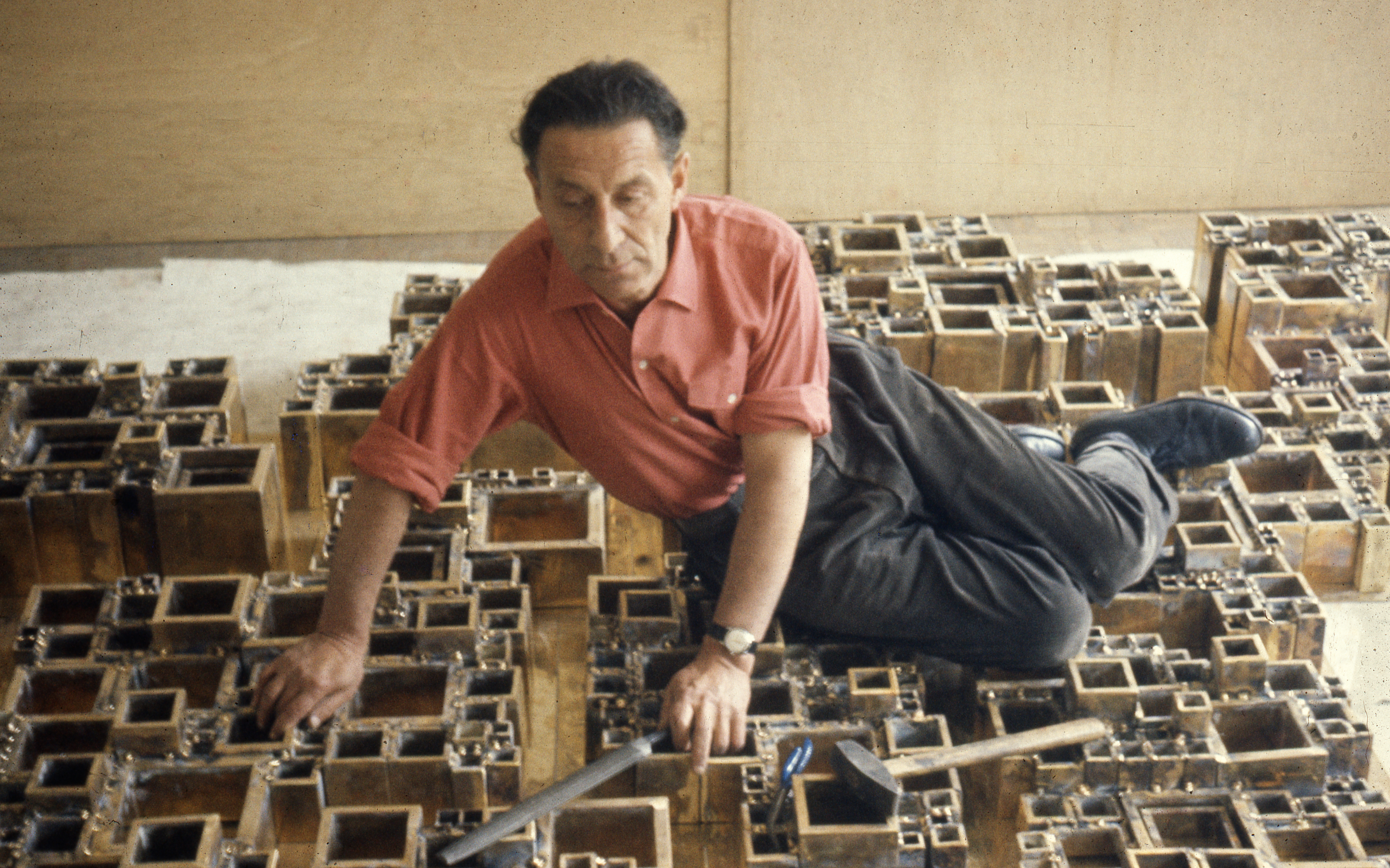
- Born: 21 March 1907; Bănița, Austria-Hungary (now Romania)
- Died: 14 June 1965 (aged 58); Zürich, Switzerland
- Known for: Sculpture

Zoltán Kemény (21 March 1907 – 14 June 1965) was a Hungarian sculptor.

== Biography ==
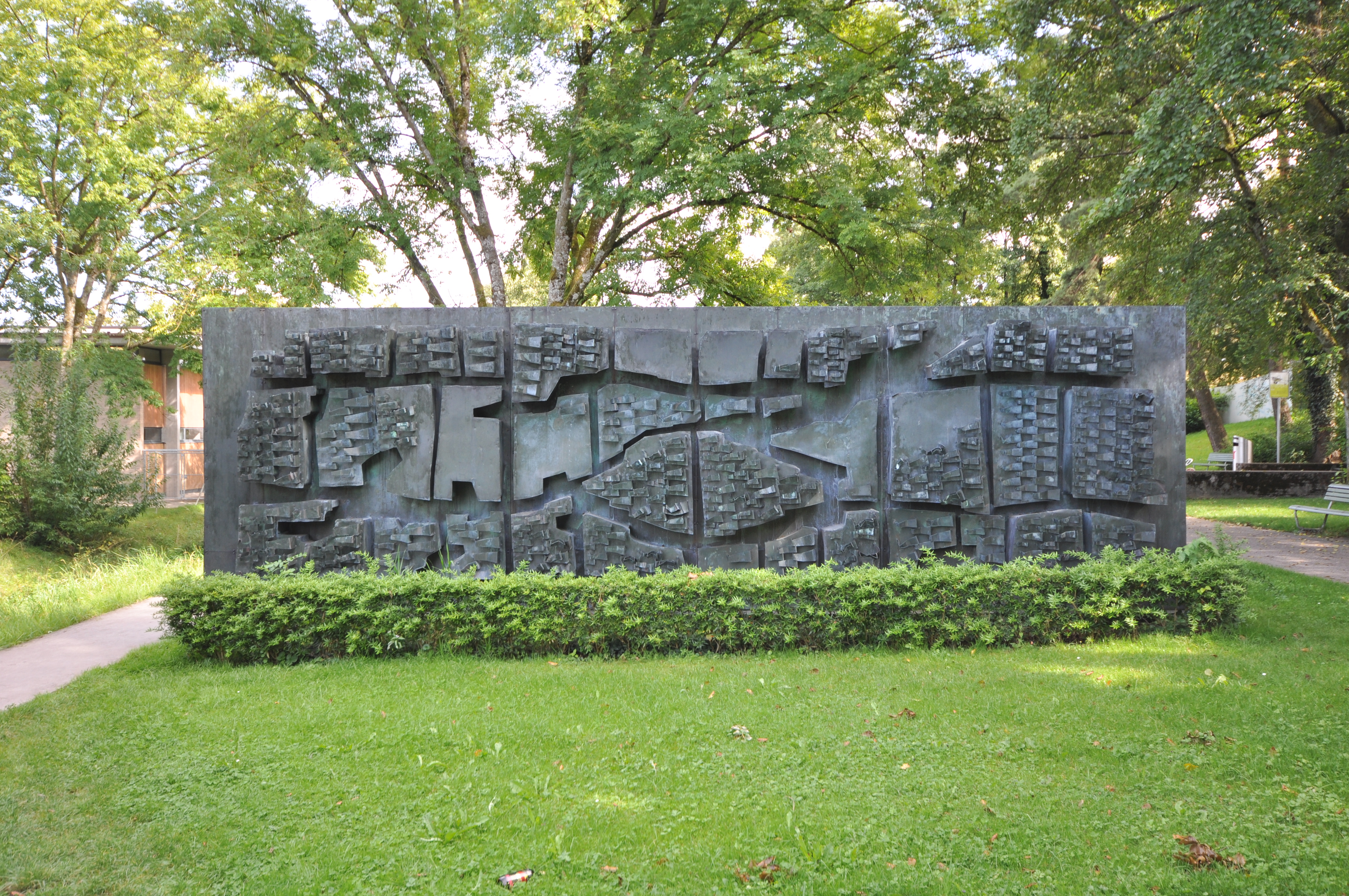
Mauer Nr. 3 von Zoltan Kemeny, 1963–1965

Kemény was born in Bănița, Austria-Hungary (present-day Romania). He was the only Hungarian to win a prize at the Venice Biennale. He died in Zürich, Switzerland, aged 58.

== See also ==
- List of sculptors
