= Alexe Procopovici =

Romanian businessman (1884–1946)

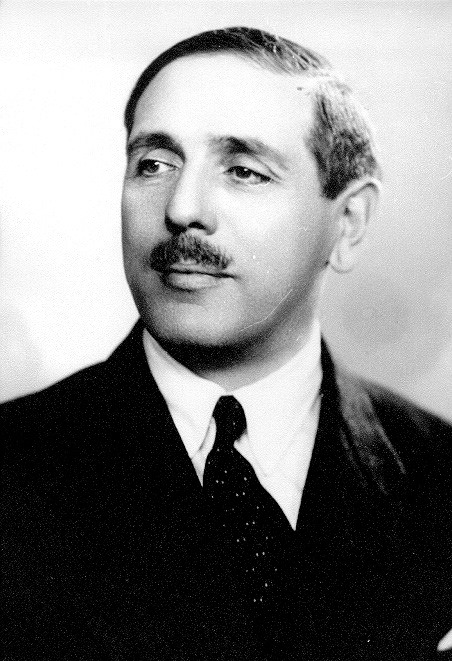
Alexe Procopovici

Alexe Procopovici (March 14, 1884 – June 22, 1946) was an Austro-Hungarian-born Romanian linguist and philologist.

== Biography ==
Born in Cernăuți, in the Duchy of Bukovina, his father was the Orthodox priest Ioan Procopovici. After graduating from the state gymnasium in his native city in 1902, he studied at the philosophy faculty of Czernowitz University, where one of his professors was Sextil Pușcariu. He specialized in classical philology and Romanian phonetics. His 1908 PhD thesis dealt with nasalization and rhotacism. He taught at a Cernăuți gymnasium from 1906 to 1919, and at a similar institution in Siret from 1909 to 1910. In late 1918, he helped found Glasul Bucovinei newspaper, joined the Romanian National Council and voted at the congress that endorsed the union of Bukovina with Romania. In the months that followed, he was intensely active at his newspaper. In June 1919, he was elected a corresponding member of the Romanian Academy; Sextil Pușcariu, who considered him Bukovina’s pre-eminent philologist, proposed the nomination, which greatly irritated Eugen Lovinescu and others. In September, he joined the Democratic Union Party, which merged into the National Liberal Party in 1923.

From 1922 to 1938, Procopovici was a full professor at Cernăuți University, serving as dean in 1924–1925. In 1927, he became an adviser to the Education Ministry on secondary schools in Bukovina. In 1933, he was elected to the Assembly of Deputies, where he represented Câmpulung Moldovenesc for the National Liberal Party–Brătianu. He founded Revista filologică (1927-1928). He contributed to Dacoromania, Arhiva (Bucharest) and Făt-Frumos (Cernăuți) magazines. He transferred to Cluj University in 1938, and in 1940 took over Pușcariu's professorship and his leadership of the Museum of the Romanian Language. From February to June 1941, he was acting rector of the university. This occurred after Pușcariu was fired due to his Iron Guard affiliation (in the wake of a failed rebellion by the organization) and before Iuliu Hațieganu was appointed on a permanent basis. At the time, the university was temporarily located in Sibiu due to the Second Vienna Award. His studies focused on early writings in Romanian and on old Romanian literature. He contributed to the academy's encyclopedic dictionary. He edited old texts such as Coresi’s sermon (1914) or Ion Neculce’s chronicle (1932). Arrested after the Romanian Communist Party came to power in 1945, he was held at the Târgu Jiu internment camp, where he became seriously ill. Once released, he returned to teaching; his final course was on the philosophy of the phrase. He died in Cluj. He was a knight of the Order of Michael the Brave.
