= Zanea =

Village in Ciurea, Romania

Zanea or Zanya (Romanian: Zanea, Vlax Romani: Zanya) is a neighborhood/village in the commune of Ciurea, Iași County, Romania. It is on the eastern side of the Ciurea train station and is inhabited by Roma from the Churari and Kalderash castes (on the western side there is the main village, inhabited by Romanians and Romanian-speaking Roma).

== History ==
Before World War II, Zanea was a Romanian village populated by peaceful peasants. They were working in their small farms as well as in a private estate (Moșie), owned by a Jewish family.

Due to antisemitic laws, the estate was confiscated. At the end of the war, it was returned to the original owners, who proceeded to renovate and repair the place. As Romania was taken over by a Soviet-backed communist administration, the estate was again confiscated in 1948 by the authorities. The estate was established as "commune property" and broke down.

In the early 1950s, 5 Roma families (gypsies) settled in the village. The neighborhood appeared in the decades 1950s–1960s as a result of the forced settlement of Roma nomads by the communist authorities (similar Kalderash and/or Churari communities in the geographical proximity are in Grajduri and in the northern side of Vaslui). These communities were already hard hit by the Porajmos (the Holocaust of the Romani people); in 1942–1944 they were deported in Transnistria, where many of them died.

Additionally to the forced settlement, the savings (in gold, as is traditionally among Roma) were confiscated by the authorities. Combined with the fact that the Communist system forbade any private business (all the economy was nationalized), thus being impeded to profess the crafts that supported their livelihood, these Roma became poorer during those decades.

After the 1989 Revolution that brought democracy in Romania, it became again legal to profess the crafts. The confiscated gold was partly returned and with that capital in the 1990s businesses were started, mostly with metals. During those years, they began to build roomy houses (with more floors, for the traditional extended Romani families), having a very different architecture from that usually employed in Romania, soon dubbed by the local mass-media as palate țigănești ("Gypsy palaces" in Romanian).

Their different style is usually presented by this media and most of the non-Romani population as expressing lack of culture, while (lacking yet a public Romani point of view about this issue) some architects point out to their spontaneity and freedom of style. Mostly the old-generation non-Roma dislike them, while the younger people and those from outside Romania (without the anti-Romani prejudices from the local context) appreciate their vitality. Acad. Constantin Bălăceanu-Stolnici, a reputed anthropologist from Romania, declared that their different style is explained since in fact they are similar to the architectural style from North India, expressing the survival of the Desi cultural archetypes even after centuries of nomadism.
