= Eugen Grigore case =

Revenge attack in Romania in July 1974

- Location: 47°4′N 27°35′E; Ciurea, Iași County, Romania
- Date: July 1974
- Attack type: Vehicle-ramming attack
- Weapon: Cargo truck
- Deaths: 24
- Injuries: 50+
- Assailant: Eugen Grigore
- Motive: Revenge

In July 1974, Romanian truck driver Eugen Grigore drove his cargo truck into a group of tents belonging to Romani nomads, killing 24 people and injuring 50 others. Grigore served approximately 27 years in prison. The case was not publicized at the time due to suppression by the Romanian state.

== Background ==
In May 1974, Eugen Grigore was a 27-year-old truck driver who worked about 14 hours a day in order to provide for his family. He had a wife, three children and a house in the Copou neighborhood from Iași. One day, the director from his workplace told him to go home, because his house was on fire. Author Traian Tandin claims that a group of Gypsy women and minors, belonging to the nomadic Gypsy tribe that was settled near Ciurea, thought that nobody was home, so they entered it in order to rob. But Grigore's wife and three children were in the backyard. According to Tandin they heard noises in the house, entered it and allegedly got immobilized by the gypsies who set the house on fire, a fire that killed the woman and all three children. The miliția's investigations were supposedly blocked because Grigore's neighbors did not want to collaborate as witnesses, as they feared retaliation by the gypsies.

== Attack ==
After two months, convinced of the helplessness of the authorities, and reportedly threatened by the gypsies who promised to take revenge if he did not give up his complaint, Grigore decided to take revenge. One day in July 1974 at noon, after drinking half a litre of cognac, he rammed his truck into the Romani tents and killed 24 people and injured about 50.

== Aftermath ==
The Communist regime did not allow the press to write anything about the incident, in order to avoid an ethnic conflict between Romanians and Gypsies. The Gypsy nomads were moved from Iași to Botoșani. Eugen Grigore was sentenced to life in prison, but in 1990 his sentence was reduced to 28 years in prison. In 1995 he was transferred to the Neuropsychiatry Hospital from Botoșani. In 2001 he was released and lived on the streets. Grigore died in July 2009 when he was hit by a truck in Iași.

== In popular culture ==
In 2008, a former police officer who became a writer, Traian Tandin, wrote about the Eugen Grigore case in his book called Cei mai odioși 100 criminali români (The 100 most hateful Romanian criminals).

In 2012 the "Eugen Grigore" case received nationwide attention, because during a Steaua București – Rapid București match, Steaua's fans showed a banner that said "Respect Eugen Grigore". This was shown as a form of disrespect towards Rapid. The incident also gained reactions from UEFA's president Michel Platini and from the European Commission against Racism and Intolerance.

== See also ==
- List of massacres in Romania
- List of rampage killers (vehicular homicide)
