= Ciurea rail disaster =

1917 Romanian fatal incident

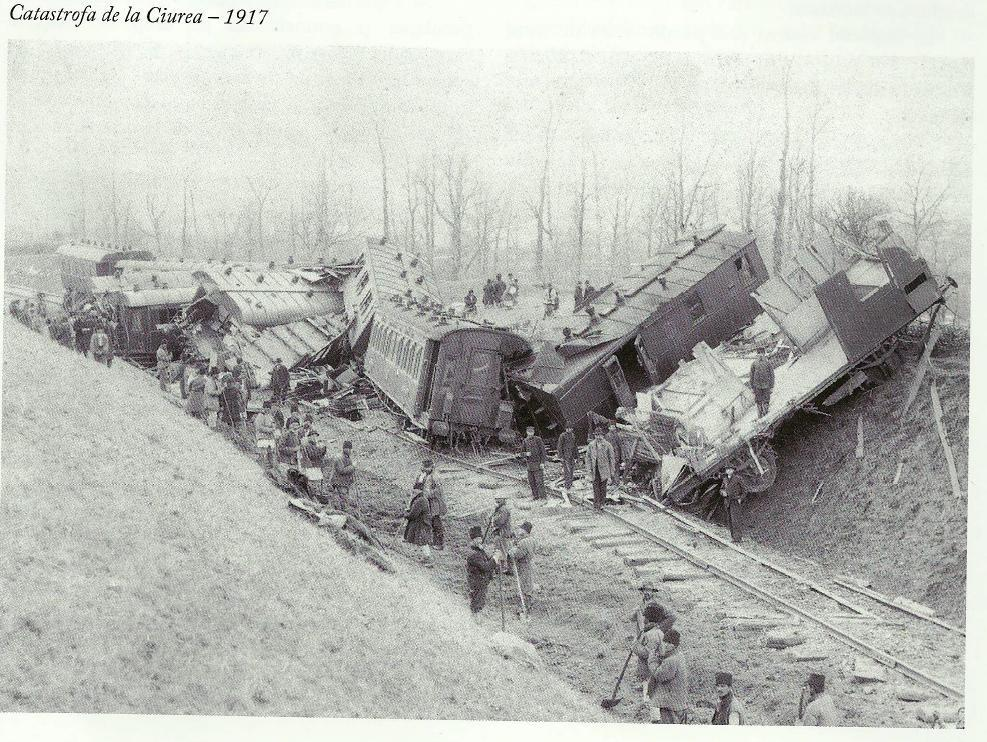
- Purported wreckage of the train

- Ciurea Station

Details
- Date: 13 January 1917 [O.S. 31 December 1916] 1 a.m.
- Location: Ciurea Station; 10 km (6.2 mi) S from Iași
- Coordinates: 46°53′17″N 27°11′12″E
- Country: Kingdom of Romania
- Line: Bârlad–Iași
- Operator: CFR
- Incident type: Derailment
- Cause: Brake failure

Statistics
- Trains: 1
- Deaths: 800–1,000

The Ciurea rail disaster, known in Romania as the Ciurea catastrophe (Romanian: Catastrofa de la Ciurea), occurred on 13 January 1917, during World War I, when a passenger train derailed and collided with a stationary train on another track. It occurred at Ciurea Station, in Iași County, a train station with a passing loop, located on the railway line from Iași to Bârlad. Two commissions of inquiry were held, one military and one technical; the report of the technical commission of the CFR, dated 24 January 1917, attributed the derailment to a failure of the Westinghouse brake caused by the severe overcrowding of the train, and found no fault on the part of the railway's staff. The death toll is also uncertain, with most sources indicating between 800 and 1,000 deaths. With these estimates, the Ciurea rail disaster is the second deadliest train wreck in history after the 2004 Sri Lanka tsunami train wreck, and the deadliest in Europe.

== The wreck ==
Train E-1, nicknamed "The Courier", consisting of 26 cars, left Galați for Iași on Friday, 11 January 1917 [O.S. 29 December 1916]. It was running several hours late as the station had been bombed by German airplanes and its locomotive had been hit by bombs and had to be replaced. The train included residents of Muntenia, who felt threatened by German bombs falling in nearby Galați, as well as the occupation of Brăila by the German Army. They were joined on the train by students and soldiers on leave. As well as Romanians, the train's passengers included Russian officers and soldiers, and members of the French military mission. Among the best-known travellers were Emil Costinescu, a former Minister of Finance, Yvonne Blondel, daughter of a former French ambassador to Bucharest, geographer George Vâlsan, and a French official, the Marquis de Belloy. The train quickly became overcrowded, and more cars were added as the train proceeded along its route, with the train sometimes waiting for hours as hundreds of travellers tried to find space.

Travel conditions were terrible: the wagons, many of them boxcars, illuminated by gas lamps, were cold; the windows had no glass, instead having planks that could not keep out the cold air. Travellers sitting on the roofs of the wagons died from the cold temperatures. "To our horror, a man and a 10-year-old boy were taken down frozen. Other shadows that were staggering, hardened by cold, recounted that, at some curves, many people – men and women – had been thrown off the train," Yvonne Blondel wrote.

The train stopped overnight in Bârlad after heavy snowfall had blocked the line, despite the efforts of soldiers and railwaymen to clear it. The next day, on 12 January, the convoy continued towards Iași, traveling 120 km (75 mi). It reached Ciurea around one o'clock the next morning, when the wreck occurred.

After the last stop at Bârnova, the train reached Ciurea station, just a few kilometers from Iași. When the crew members tried to reduce speed, they realised that the brakes, despite having been checked at Bălteni station, were not functioning. According to the newspaper "Mișcarea", the compressed air brake system functioned only for the first two wagons, the valve being accidentally closed at the third wagon. The train derailed and collided with a locomotive standing on another line. The locomotive's speedometer needle was found stuck at 95 km/h (59 mph), — the probable speed of the train at the moment of the wreck. A survivor commented: "I sensed perfectly how the train jumped off the rails like a monstrous reptile of iron and steel, pulling all its travelers to mutilation or on the great journey to beyond... I had the feeling that I was thrown into the bottom of a pit, a rain of objects sliding around my body... How long did this torment last? A few minutes, but to me it seemed interminable...".

Receiving signals sent by the engineers of the stricken locomotives, Ciurea railway station employees activated a switch so that the train would enter line 2 and avoid collision with wagons filled with tar that were stopped on line 1. Because of the high speed and sharp angle, however, only the locomotive and one wagon managed to enter line 2; all but two of the other cars derailed. It seems that at least one of the wagons collided with some fuel tanks, triggering an explosion and a huge fire. The train burned in less than two hours. Yvonne Blondel was rescued by two soldiers of the French military mission, who pulled her out of the train wreck exactly when her clothes were ablaze. Other passengers died in the fire or were killed by the impact of the derailment. Those traveling on the roofs of the wagons were either thrown under the train cars and crushed, or thrown into the snow. The same French survivor describes the scenes of the tragedy, including the emergence of looters, who robbed the travellers. Teams of rescuers arrived soon after – soldiers of the ammunition depot near the train station, railway workers, two companies of Romanian soldiers, and two companies of Russian soldiers. The survivors were transported to the Iași railway station, where they were given first aid.

== Investigation ==
Two commissions were appointed after the disaster. A military commission, charged with identifying the dead and the injured and with inventorying their belongings, was made up of major Paul Zotta, commander of the Iași gendarme detachment, lieutenant Eugeniu Herovan, royal commissar at the court martial of the IV Army Corps, and captain Ioan Jugureanu, delegate of the Iași garrison command. A second commission, of CFR specialists, was charged with investigating the causes of the accident, and was made up of chief engineer Teodor Burghele, sub-inspector Traian Pătârlăgeanu and chief engineer Vasile Carp.

The technical commission's report, five pages long and dated 24 January 1917, concluded that the cause of the accident was the closing of the tap on the air pipe of the Westinghouse brake, behind the luggage van. The commission reasoned that the brake shoes of that van were found welded to the wheel tyres and burnt, while on the rest of the train they stood clear of them, and that the brake had worked normally until the train's stop at Bârnova; it concluded that the closing could only have been caused by one of the soldiers riding on the couplings between the carriages, who had struck the tap with his foot without realising it. The report found that the drivers had taken every measure prescribed in such a case, applying counter-pressure and sand without appreciable effect, and that no blame attached to the company's staff.

The report also addressed the claim, reported in the Iași press at the time, that the locomotive's speedometer needle had been found jammed at 95 km/h (59 mph): it recorded that nothing could be established on that point, the instrument on the leading engine, no. 460, being defective and the rear engine carrying none.

Questioned by the commission, the station masters, the train chief and the drivers stated that seven additional wagons not fitted with the Westinghouse brake had been attached to the train on the authority of the Romanian General Headquarters, and that nine additional staff, specially instructed for the purpose, had been posted to work those wagons' hand brakes from Bârnova on account of the gradient ahead; the train chief's statement concluded that "the precaution was not sufficient". The acting station master at Ciurea, newly arrived in the post after being evacuated from Prahova county, stated that train E-1 could not be taken on line 1 because a munitions train of fifty wagons stood there, the other lines being occupied as well, and that in his view the accident could not have been avoided. Railway staff also described being unable to prevent passengers, most of them soldiers, from riding on the roofs, buffers, steps and couplings of the carriages; one driver stated that a Russian soldier had threatened him with a rifle when he tried to stop him climbing onto the engine.

The report attributed the fire that followed the derailment to the stoves heating some of the carriages, among them the sleeping car and the Russian car, and its sudden spread to the blau-gas with which some of the carriages were lit, no fire pumps being at hand. The flames later reached two wagons of munitions and a third-class carriage standing on line 1 as part of train no. 2653, which could not be drawn out of the station because derailed carriages lay across the track.

== Lack of information ==
The lack of information on the wreck is due primarily to the exceptional situation in which the Romanian state found itself at the time. The Kingdom of Romania was at war with the Central Powers, and the government, the military, and most citizens took refuge in Moldavia, while Muntenia, including its capital Bucharest, and Dobruja were occupied. Given the national crisis, few newspapers reported the wreck. The records of the inquiry are held by the National Archives of Romania, in the fond Departament CFR – Direcția Contencios, and were described in detail in 2025. Primary sources of information are limited to the testimony of survivors, memoirs, press, and interwar publications that have addressed the issue.

Likewise, doubts have been cast on whether the photo of the wreck circulated by the media was authentic and depicted the actual derailment at Ciurea. Taken, as stated, on 19 January [O.S. 6 January] 1917, it shows no trace of snow, although two distinct memoirs mention passengers surviving because they were thrown off the train into banks of snow. As such, this photo is not dated correctly. It is known that Ciurea was the site of several train wrecks during the early twentieth century, with one known incident taking place in 1925. The photo may well have been taken on one of those other occasions.

== Aftermath ==
In the first hours after the wreck, several officials arrived at the scene – Dimitrie Greceanu, Minister of Public Works, the prosecutor general, the prefect of Iași, but also security agents who began to question witnesses. By the morning, the news of the train wreck had spread throughout the city. Daylight revealed the magnitude of the tragedy: "Passing through Ciurea I looked the disaster: wagons crushed, burned and teams of workers drew more dead from under the wreck. Behind the station the dead were lined up in four rows ... several hundreds. With eyes removed, heads broken, arms detached, hands, legs, burned bodies. Women, officers, soldiers...". Another notes: "A whole string of wagons burnt, not even with their the metal skeletion, soaked like wax by the fire that consumed it... around the station everything seemed ruins and grave...".

Hundreds of bodies were found among the twisted metal remnants of the train cars. The victims were laid out near the station and countless calls were made to people to help identify them. Very few of the bodies were ever identified. They were buried in mass graves on the field behind the Ciurea station, for the victims identified by then – 374 people.

Among the dead were lieutenant Vasile Cantacuzino, son of eminent jurist and politician Matei B. Cantacuzino, and commander Alexandru Cătuneanu, author of the first navigation map of the Black Sea. The historian Vasile Pârvan was injured in the wreck, and so was the geographer George Vâlsan.

Over the next several days, provisional lists of names of the identified dead were announced. Rumours soon began to spread: there were discussions about fortunes destroyed in the fire or looted by thieves, the death toll was amplified, and famous names were fraudulently added to the lists of victims. In German-occupied Muntenia, a memoirist wrote about reports of the wreck, noting with malicious joy "the death of Take Ionescu, Cantacuzino (Minister of Justice), Costinescu (Minister of Finance)".

== Memorials ==
In January 2017, a wayside cross (troiță) was erected by the Ciurea town hall near the train station in memory of the unidentified victims of the 1917 disaster. Next to the cross, the Romanian Maritime Hydrographic Directorate installed a commemorative plaque for commander Alexandru Cătuneanu.
