= Lujerului tram accident =

2012 tram crash in Bucharest, Romania

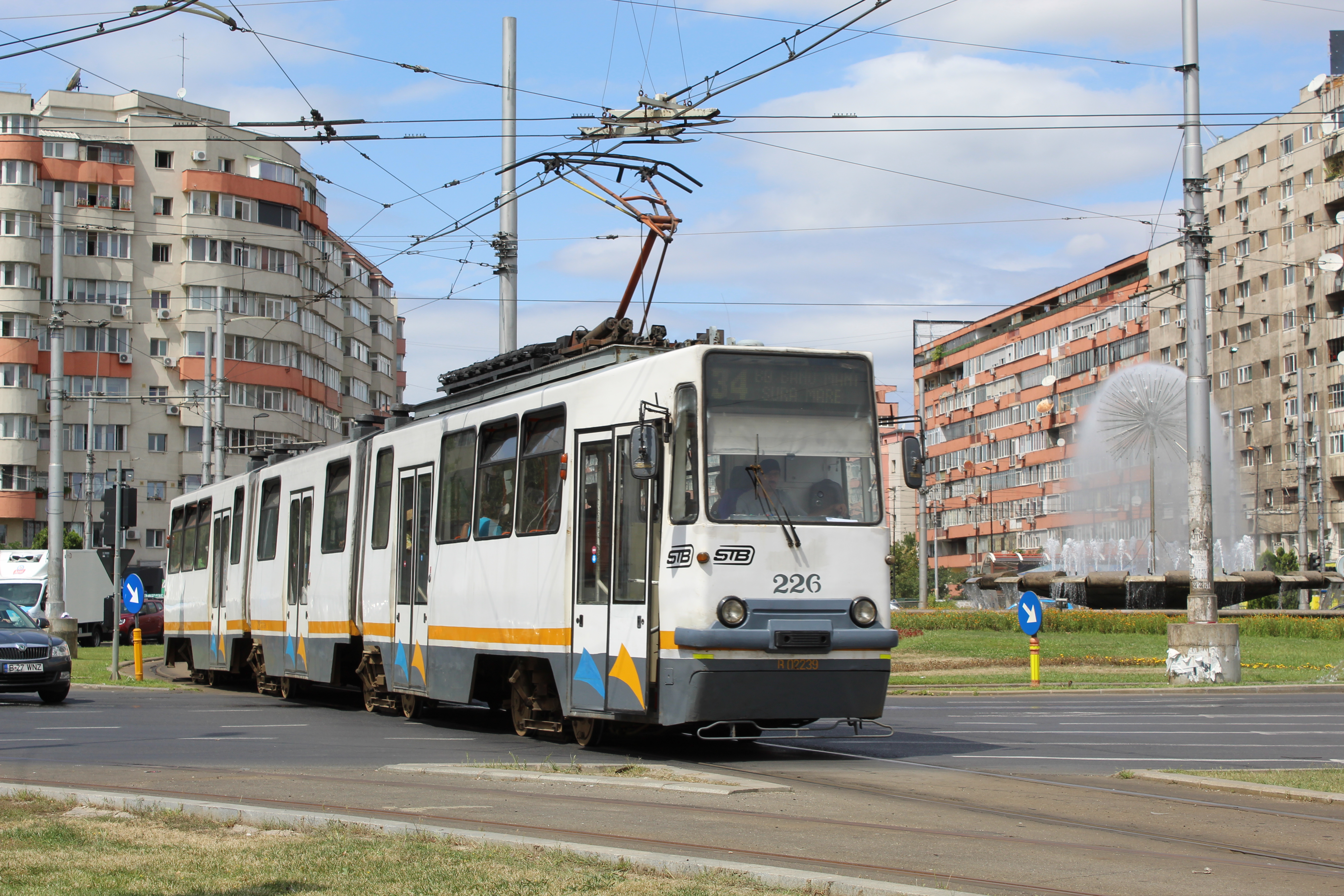
- Three RATB V3A trams, identical to this one were involved in the accident

Details
- Date: 10 May 2012; 7:11 AM
- Location: Lujerului Underpass
- Country: Romania
- Line: 41
- Operator: RATB
- Incident type: collision
- Cause: human error

Statistics
- Trains: 3
- Vehicles: V3A trams 110, 296 and 300
- Passengers: over 200
- Deaths: 0
- Injured: ~100
- Damage: see below

The Lujerului tram crash took place on 10 May 2012 in Militari, a neighborhood in Bucharest, Romania. During rush hour, a tram broke down and the driver of a third tram failed to stop, hitting a second tram that had stopped.

This was one of the two tram accidents that took place in Bucharest in the same year. Later on 18 July 2012, another less-serious accident took place in at the Rahova-Ferentari intersection.

== Background ==
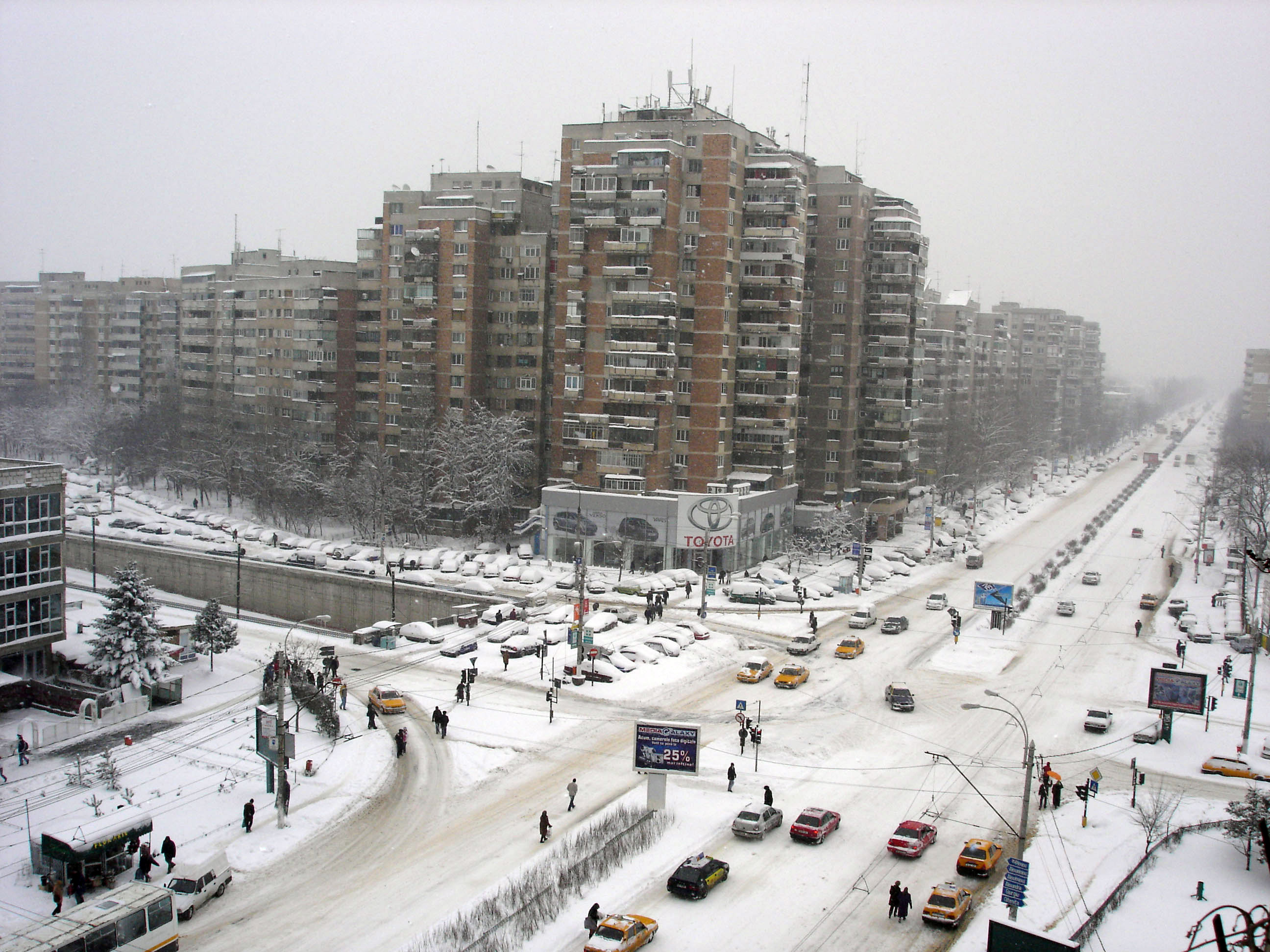
Lujerului Underpass area in the winter of 2005-2006. The accident happened below the square in this photo.

=== The tram line ===
The tram line 41 is one of the most important and most busy tram lines in Bucharest. It began operation in 1984 and was completed in 1987, and was finally converted to a light rail line in 2002. Starting from Ghencea and going through Drumul Taberei, Militari, Crângași, Domenii towards the House of the Free Press, the important corridor serves people who go to the North of the city for work or people who often visit important markets along the line. Due to its status, trams often have to follow tight schedules, going at an average speed of 40 km/h (maximum allowed speeds are 55 km/h, in the underpass the limit would normally be 30 km/h), and during rush hour there is one tram per two minutes. When circulation on the line is disrupted due to various reasons, a replacement line (641) is made on the same route, using buses, which was the case after the crash, however it has a lower efficiency due to the traffic on the route, compared to the 41, which is (almost) fully grade-separated.

=== The trams ===
Line 41 of the tram network in Bucharest uses the V3A of the Bucharest Articulated Tramcar family, like most tram routes in the city. Served by the Bucureștii-Noi and Alexandria depots, it uses the 1993, FAUR, CH-PPC and M2000 variants. The last one was specifically made for the line - a subtype of the 1993 model, it features high-speed pantographs, plastic bumpers, round headlights and various other modifications for the line, being used mostly on line 41. Sometimes it is also used by lines 20 (which ceased to exist in 2015), 24, 42 and 45, served by the Bucureștii-Noi depot where they are stabled.

- 110 was made in 1976 as a V3A-71 tram, and modernized in 1997 to a V3A-93 tram. At the time of the accident, it had a RT1 (every 5000 km) revision on 30 April 2012, and with the last major repair in 2004.
- 300 was made in 1980 as a V3A-71 tram, and modernized in 2002 to a V3A-93 tram, subtype M2000. At the time of the accident, it had a RT1 revision on 4 May 2012, and was released from its last major repair on 2 April 2012. It had been involved in an accident just prior to its modernization, when it split into half at Piața Sudului in 2000.
- 296 was made in 1980 as a V3A-71 tram, and modernized in 1999 to a V3A-93 tram. At the time of the accident, it had a RT2 (every 20.000 km) revision on 8 May 2012, and with the last major repair in 2004.

All trams belonged to the Bucureștii-Noi depot, 110 has been since transferred to the Dudești depot.

== Sequence of events ==
The accident took place at the beginning of the rush hour. Sometime between 7:05 and 7:08 in the morning, tram 110, heading from Ghencea to House of the Free Press left the "Bulevardul Timișoara" stop in Drumul Taberei. Heading into the Lujerului Underpass, it suffered a failure and was forced to stop in the underpass.

At 7:09, tram 300 approached the overpass and the driver noticed 110 stopped near the exit and approached the broken down tram carefully, before stopping behind it. Passengers in both of the trams remained inside, despite the nearby avenue being lightly circulated at the time, as the policy of the RATB states that "when a vehicle is declared officially broken down, only then the passengers can leave it and board other vehicles". Even so, the walk to the nearest stop (which is beyond the underpass) would take place in rather unsuitable conditions, since there are only roadways and the concrete-foundations tram track in the middle.

One minute later, tram 296 left Drumul Taberei heading towards House of the Free Press, and entered the underpass at 7:11 at 50 km/h. The driver was able to notice 300 in front of him, but he was not able to brake in time to stop behind it, and slammed into it at 7:11:09 AM. The impact resulted in the last carriage of 300 and the first carriage of 296 ending up with bent frames, and shattered windows. The rear end of 300 (where the shunting controls are located) was destroyed and pushed inside, whilst the front of 296 was crushed and the destination display fell from its hinges. The impact was so strong it derailed the two trams involved in the crash and pushed 300 into the back of 110, damaging its rear lights and causing a few dents to its last carriage, even leaving a square mark from a bumper from the front of 300. Remarkably, the windows on the doors were not shattered. A fourth tram, 218, managed to stop in time, before the wreckage, in the tunnel.

As the incident took place during rush hour, the people, packed inside the trams were thrown around and injured from hitting various objects (handrails, hard seats, the floor) and glass shards. The final figure of the crash stood at 92 injured, with 23 seriously injured, among them 3 of them treated for brain trauma, requiring surgery. At the University Hospital of Bucharest alone, there were 34 injured.

== Aftermath ==
Shortly after the accident, chaos ensued. Initially people attempted to escape through the shattered windows, and a few seconds later the doors opened by themselves, meaning that the driver and tram could still operate some controls. Minutes later all traffic ground to a halt. Roughly half an hour later, emergency vehicles showed up and a bus line was introduced. By 13:15, the line was cleared and at 14:00 the tram line resumed its operation.

The driver of the third tram was arrested by the Romanian Police, during questioning he pleaded guilty to bodily harm charges, however he was released due to the lack of criminal charges against him. During his arrest he said that he was guilty of the accident, but he could do nothing to prevent it.

Tram 110 was the first one to be put back into service after the investigation of the crash, due to its small amount of damage. Trams 296 and 300 were out of order for months after the investigation was completed, but all returned to service by April 2013. As of April 2019, they are still active in the STB (former RATB) roster.
