= Merișor derailment =

2017 railway incident in Romania

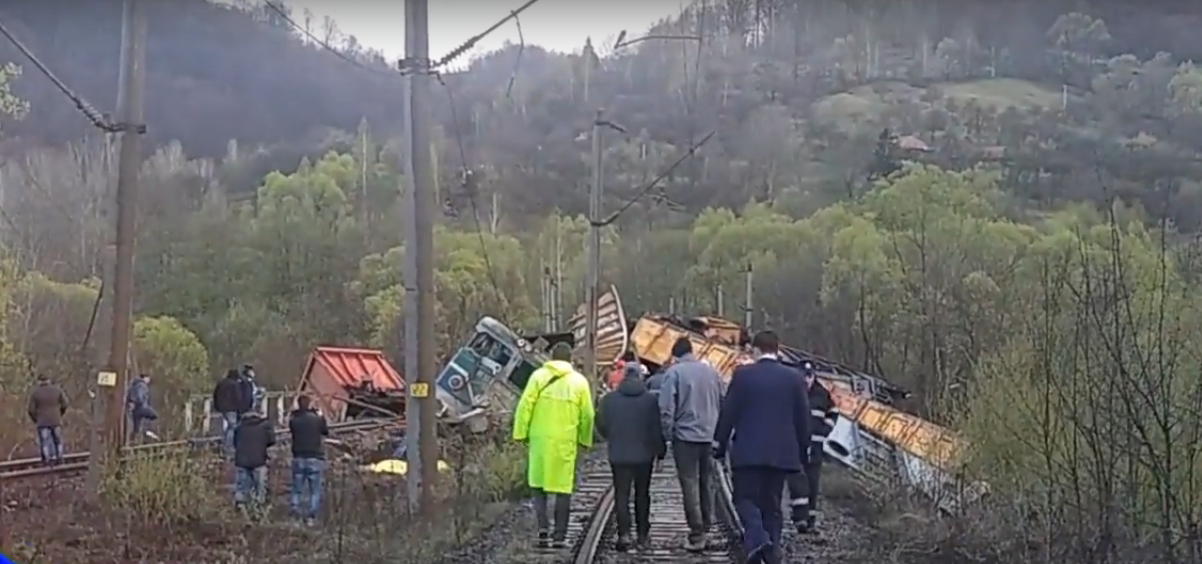
- Aftermath of the derailment

- Location within Romania

Details
- Date: 8 April 2017
- Location: Merișor, Bănița, Hunedoara County, Romania
- Coordinates: 45°26′44.07″N 23°14′7.00″E
- Country: Romania
- Incident type: Derailment
- Cause: Brake failure

Statistics
- Trains: 1
- Passengers: 0
- Crew: 2
- Deaths: 2
- Injured: 0

The Merișor derailment was a railway accident that took place on 8 April 2017 at Merișor, Bănița, Romania, on the Târgu Jiu to Simeria line, killing both crew members on board.

== Background ==
=== The railway line ===
The accident location at Merișor is situated on the line between Filiași and Simeria, commonly known as the "Jiu Valley Line", since it crosses the Carpathian Mountains along the Jiu River, being considered one of the most scenic railway lines in Romania. The exact section at Merișor is situated on the Petroșani to Subcetate segment of the line, known for its steep inclines and twisty sections as its leaving the Petroșani basin trying to cross a hilly area to get to the Hațeg basin. When the line was electrified on 31 October 1973, a neutral section was installed a few hundred meters from the accident location, which soon became known as "the hardest neutral section in Romania" due to the fact that its situated on a steep gradient and that trains cannot go at speeds higher than 30 km/h (19 mph) in the area, due to the poor maintenance of the railway line. The line at the site of the accident was designed to take speeds of 60 km/h (37 mph) at most.

=== The train ===
The train was made out of a CFR Class 40 locomotive, commonly classed as the LE 5100 series made by Electroputere Craiova, and 16 E-type carriages, normally used for carrying gravel, waste iron, logs, etc. The exact locomotive in question was 40-0759-7, it was made at the Electroputere works in 1983, and previously it had serviced in Bulgaria around 2008–2009, being used by "Unitranskom" at Burgas. At the time of the accident, it was refurbished, but it is believed that the compressor failed. Another theory is that the INDA-type throttle installation was jammed in a superior position that would have reduced the efficiency of the braking and failed to reduce the traction motor current intensity. 40-0759-7 was also involved in another incident relating to overspeeding on inclines near Predeal before the accident.

The railway company who owned this locomotive, Unicom Tranzit was apparently involved in multiple train accidents/incidents during the time period before and after this accident, and many safety irregularities have came out after the accident. However the operating licence of this company was not suspended.

== Accident ==
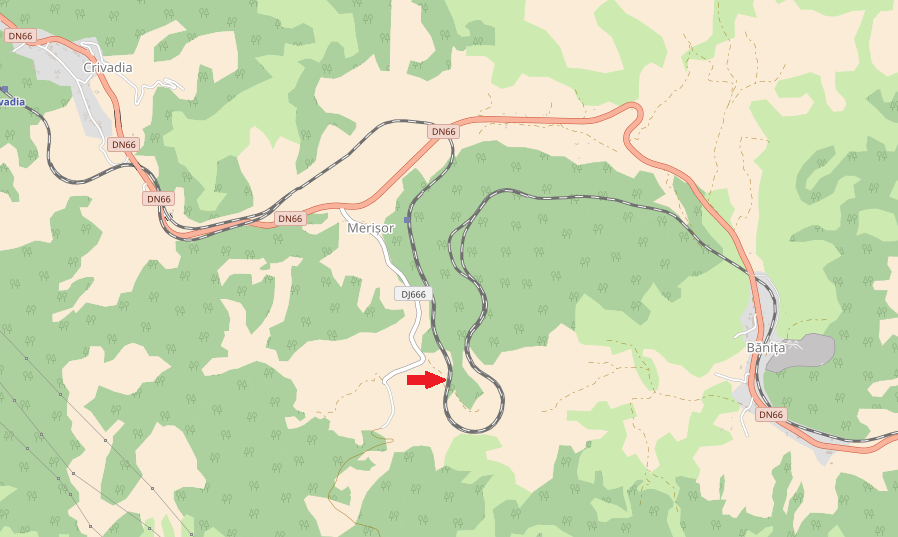
The map of the accident location

When the accident occurred the train was en route from Slatina to Curtici, carrying waste iron. Whilst en route from Petroșani to Subcetate, near the village of Bănița, the train driver and helper noticed that the train was speeding uncontrollably and whilst trying to slow down, the train drivers also noticed the brake systems failed. The runaway train derailed on a bridge in a curve after overspeeding (entering the curve at 95 to 100 kilometres per hour (59 to 62 mph), on a 30 km/h zone), killing both train drivers and destroying most of the consist in the process. The damage was severe. The locomotive was severely damaged whilst most of the freight cars got destroyed, falling into a river ten meters below. The railway line also suffered damage too, with most of the trackside objects and OHLE being destroyed in the process.

Most passenger trains (Semi Fast and Fast trains) were redirected on the Filiași – Orșova – Timișoara – Arad line (CFR Mainline 900) whilst slower stopping services going to Simeria will stop at the nearest rail station, then transported by coaches on the disrupted section, and put back on the train at the nearest station on the other side of the accident.

The Romanian Railways announced that they will bring 4 heavy cranes to clean up the aftermath of the accident.

== Investigation ==
Based on the first investigation, it appears that the train had a problem in the braking system.
