= Ciurea =

- Commune
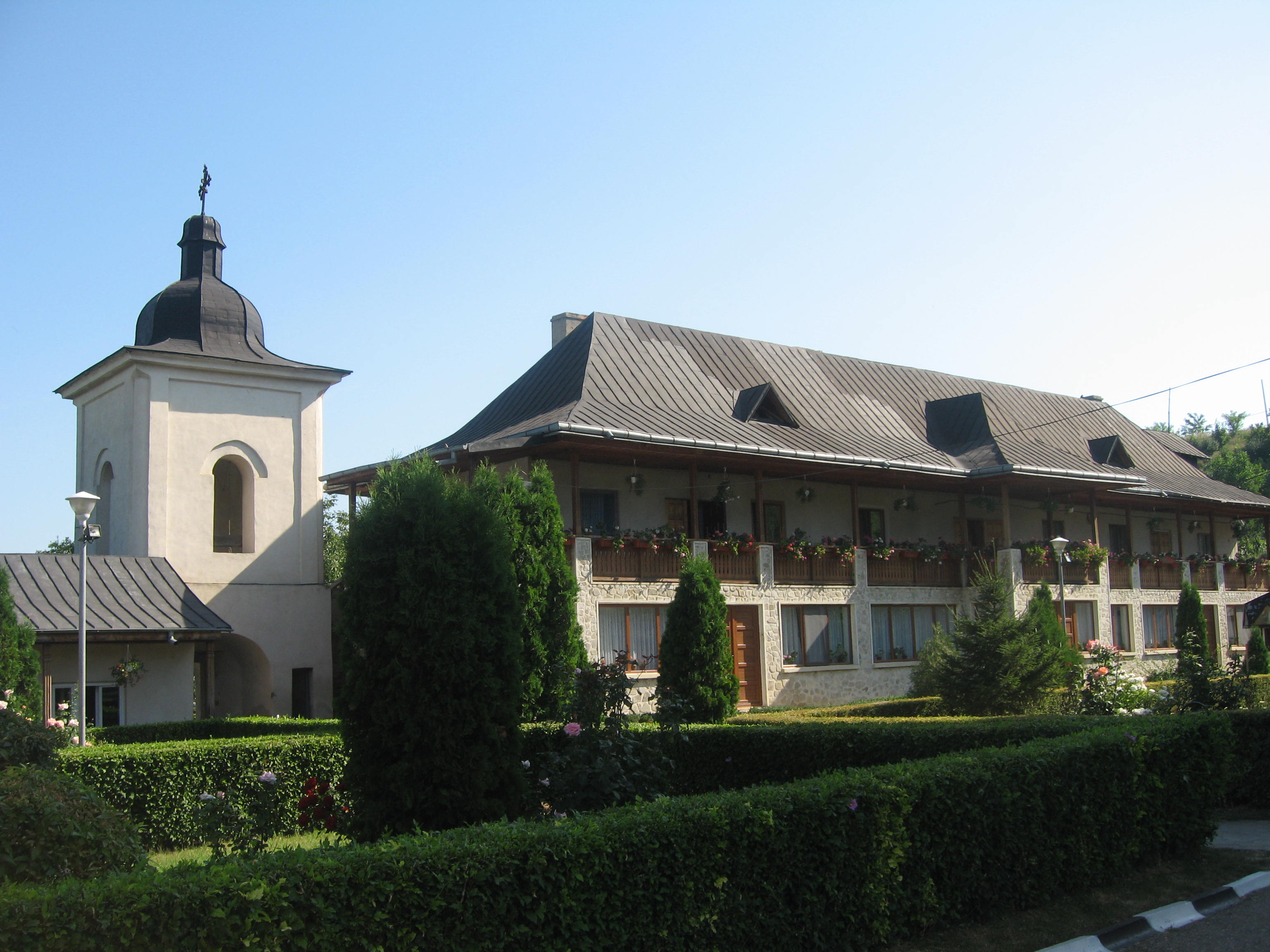
- Hlincea Monastery

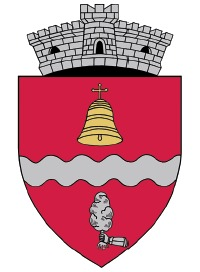
- Coat of arms

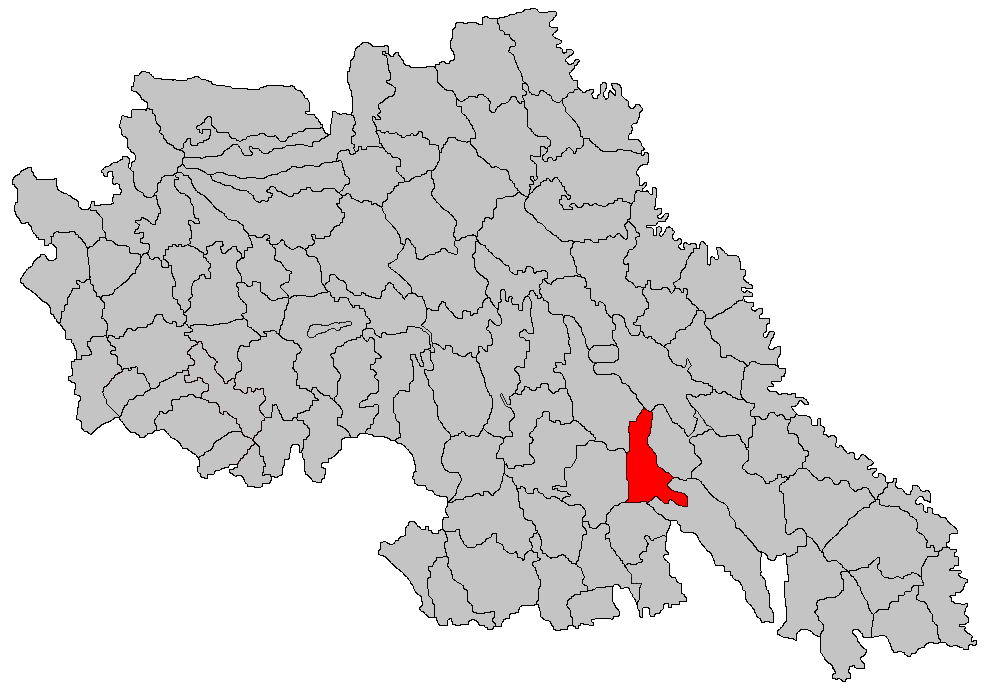
- Location in Iași County

- Location in Romania
- Coordinates: 47°4′N 27°35′E
- Country: Romania
- County: Iași

Government
  - Mayor (2020–2024): Cătălin Lupu (PSD)
- Area: 28.76 km^{2} (11.10 sq mi)
- Elevation: 93 m (305 ft)
- Population (2021-12-01): 17,254
  - Density: 599.9/km^{2} (1,554/sq mi)
- Time zone: UTC+02:00 (EET)
  - Summer (DST): UTC+03:00 (EEST)
- Postal code: 707080
- Area code: +(40) 232
- Vehicle reg.: IS
- Website: comunaciurea.ro

Ciurea is a commune in Iași County, Western Moldavia, Romania, part of the Iași metropolitan area. Situated 7 km (4.3 mi) south from the county seat of Iași, it is composed of seven villages: Ciurea, Curături, Dumbrava, Hlincea, Lunca Cetățuii, Picioru Lupului, and Slobozia. It also includes the majority-Romani neighborhood of Zanea.

== Notable people ==
- Pavel Coruț, a writer, studied gymnasium in Ciurea.

== Notable events ==
- The Ciurea rail disaster happened here on 13 January 1917.
- The Eugen Grigore vehicle-ramming attack occurred here in July 1974.
