= Simion Mehedinți =

Romanian geographer

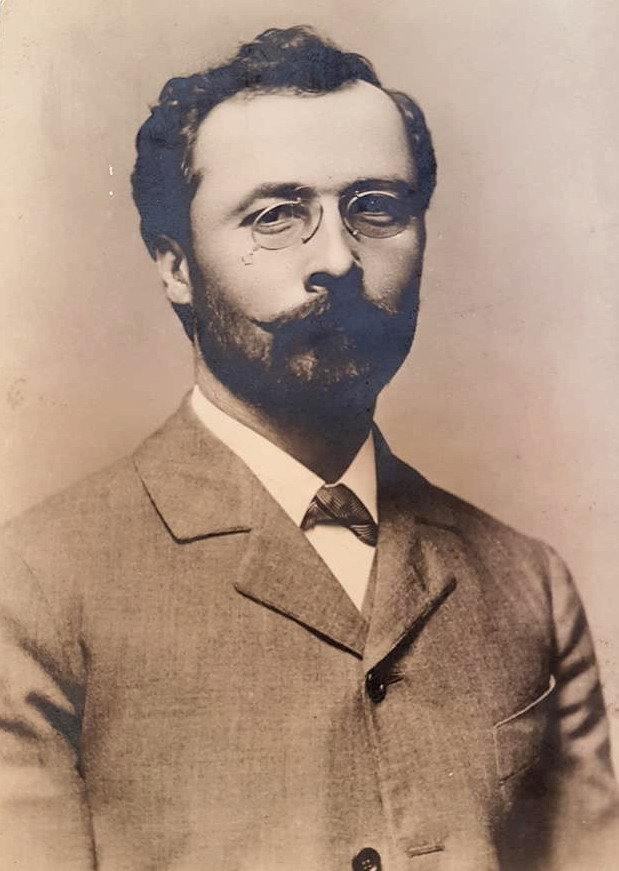
Simion Mehedinți, in 1918

Simion Mehedinți (Romanian pronunciation: [simiˈon meheˈdint͡sʲ]; October 19, 1868 – December 14, 1962) was a Romanian geographer, the founding father of modern Romanian geography, and a titular member of the Romanian Academy. A figure of importance in the Junimea literary club, he was for a while editor of its magazine, Convorbiri Literare, and became a supporter of the fascist Iron Guard.

He was born in Soveja, Vrancea County. After attending primary school in his native village, he went to study theology, first in Focșani, and then in Bucharest, where he graduated from high school in 1888. He then enrolled at the Faculty of Letters of the University of Bucharest, graduating with a B.A. thesis on "J.J. Rousseau’s ideas on education." He then pursued his studies in Paris, with Paul Vidal de la Blache, and at the University of Berlin, with Ferdinand von Richthofen. In 1895, Mehedinți transferred to Leipzig University, where he completed a Ph.D. degree in early 1899, with thesis "Über die Kartographische Induction" written under the direction of Friedrich Ratzel. He then returned to Romania, where he was appointed professor at the University of Bucharest and head of the first geography department at that university. He was a strong proponent of the geomorphology approach to geographic studies; his powerful position enabled him to impose this point of view on Romanian geography.

Mehedinți was elected corresponding member of the Romanian Academy in 1908, and titular member in 1915. The new communist regime purged him from the Academy in 1948.

He died in Bucharest in 1962 and was buried at Bellu Cemetery. Streets in Oradea, Otopeni, Sibiu, and in the Crângași neighborhood of Bucharest are named after him. High schools in Codlea, Galați, and Vidra also bear his name.
