= Lipoveni (disambiguation) =

Lipoveni may refer to:

- Lipovans
- Lipoveni, a commune in Cimișlia District, Moldova
- Lipoveni, a village in Mitocu Dragomirnei Commune, Suceava County, Romania
- Lipoveni, the Romanian name for Lipovany village, Lukivtsi, Vyzhnytsia Raion, Ukraine
