= Vasile Grecu =

Romanian philologist and historian

Vasile Grecu (31 July 1885 – 26/27 May 1972) was an Austro-Hungarian-born Romanian philologist and Byzantinist.

== Early life and education ==
Born in Mitocu Dragomirnei, north of Suceava, his parents were Manole Greciuc and Ana (née Burac). He studied at the Greek-Orthodox Gymnasium in Suceava (1897-1905), followed by the Universities of Vienna (1905-1907) and Czernowitz (1907-1909), where Sextil Pușcariu was his professor.

== Career ==
From 1910 to 1914, Grecu taught Latin and Greek at the state high school in Câmpulung Moldovenesc. After the outbreak of World War I, he took refuge in the Romanian Old Kingdom. There, he was a proofreader at Monitorul Oficial in Bucharest and a substitute teacher at Mircea cel Batrân High School in Constanța until Romania entered the war in August 1916. From that point until autumn 1918, he was in Bessarabia, where he helped develop Romanian-language education.

Returning to Cernăuți, Grecu took part in the Romanian National Council and voted for union with Romania in late November. His doctorate, earned at Cernăuți in 1919, dealt with flora and fauna in Plato’s philosophical system.

Among the first Romanian scholars in the field, Grecu taught Byzantinology at Cernăuți from 1920 to 1938, and at the University of Bucharest from 1938 to 1947. He was dean of the letters and philosophy faculty at Cernăuți (1927-1938) and secretary of the history and linguistics institute. Elected a corresponding member of the Romanian Academy in May 1936, he was purged in 1948 by the new communist regime and posthumously restored in 1990.

Grecu was president of the Romanian Society for Byzantine Studies and vice president of the International Association of Byzantine Studies.

== Notable works and translations ==
Grecu edited Candela and Codrul Cosminului magazines, contributing to Glasul Bucovinei, Byzantinoslavica (Prague), Revista de studii sud-est europene, Visantinskii vreminik (Moscow), Revue des Études Bysantines and Revista Istorică Română. He wrote studies on Byzantine history, literature and painting, as well as on the influence of Byzantium on Romanian history. He translated a collection of teachings by Neagoe Basarab from Greek into Romanian. He discovered and translated the Byzantine source for a book of teachings by Coresi. He prepared critical editions of the works of the Greek historians Doukas, Kritoboulos of Imbros, George Sphrantzes and Constantine Porphyrogenitus.
