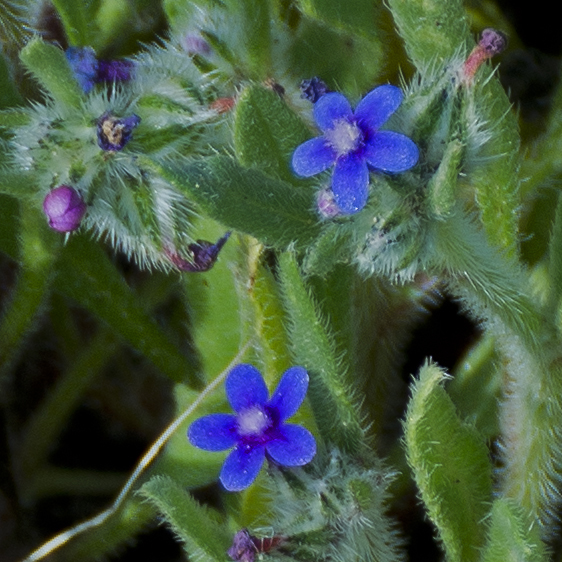
- Flowering in Israel

Scientific classification
- Kingdom: Plantae
- Clade: Tracheophytes
- Clade: Angiosperms
- Clade: Eudicots
- Clade: Asterids
- Order: Boraginales
- Family: Boraginaceae
- Genus: Hormuzakia
- Species: H. aggregata

Binomial name
- Hormuzakia aggregata (Lehm.) Gușul.

Synonyms
- Anchusa aggregata Lehm.; Anchusa aggregata var. pedunculata Parsa; Anchusa axillaris Parsa; Anchusa micrantha Roem. & Schult.; Anchusa parviflora Sm.; Lycopsis glomerata d'Urv.

= Hormuzakia aggregata =

Massed alkanet

Species of plant

Hormuzakia aggregata is a flowering annual plant in the borage family, known by the common names massed alkanet, Arabic: لسان الثور, and Hebrew: לשון-שור מגובבת.

== Description ==
It is a short-lived herbaceous plant with 10 to 50 cm (3.9 to 19.7 in) ascending hispid stems. The entire leaves are alternate, linear-lanceolate. It flowers from January to April, the small flowers are dark blue to violet producing 3 by 4 mm (0.12 by 0.16 in) hemispherical nutlets.

== Taxonomy ==
The species name Hormuzakia derives from Constantin N. Hurmuzachi, a prominent Romanian naturalist. Anchusa derives from the Greek: αγχουσα, a plant used as a rouge. The epithet aggregata, derives from Latin and means to bring together or cluster.

- The standard author abbreviation Lehm. is used to indicate Johann Georg Christian Lehmann (1792 – 1860), a German botanist.
- The standard author abbreviation Gusul. is used to indicate Mihail Gușuleac (1887-1960), a Romanian botanist.

== Distribution and habitat ==
It grows in Mediterranean woodlands, shrublands, shrub-steppes and deserts of Sicily, North East Egypt and the Sinai Peninsula, Libya, Algeria, Turkey, Cyprus, Lebanon, Israel, Rhodes, Saudi Arabia and the East Aegean Islands.

== Uses ==
The roots of Hormuzakia aggregata contain anchusin or alkannin (alkanet red), a red-brown resinoid pigment. Alkannin is an antioxidant and has an antimicrobial effect against Staphylococcus aureus and Staphylococcus epidermidis. It is also known to have wound healing, antitumor, and antithrombotic properties.

Alkannin is also found in the Chinese herbal medicine plant Lithospermum erythrorhizon, the red-root gromwell. The dried root is a Chinese herbal medicine with various antiviral and biological activities, including inhibition of human immunodeficiency virus type 1 (HIV-1).
