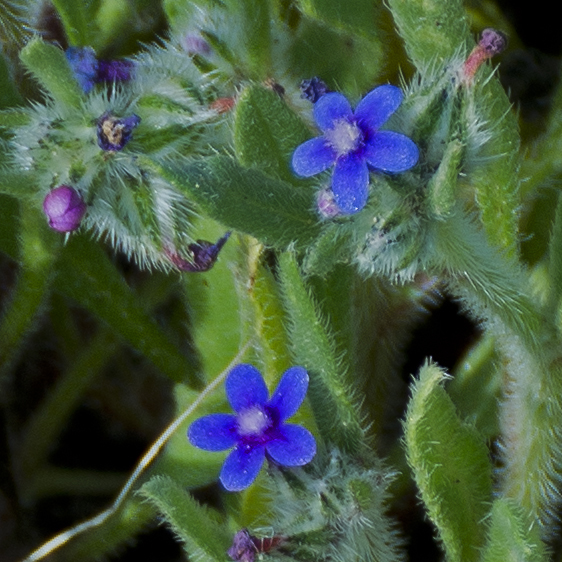
- Hormuzakia aggregata

Scientific classification
- Kingdom: Plantae
- Clade: Tracheophytes
- Clade: Angiosperms
- Clade: Eudicots
- Clade: Asterids
- Order: Boraginales
- Family: Boraginaceae
- Genus: Hormuzakia; Guşul.

Species
- See text.

= Hormuzakia =

Genus of plants

Hormuzakia is a genus of flowering plant in the family Boraginaceae, native to central and eastern Mediterranean. The genus was established by Mihail Gușuleac in 1923.

== Species ==
As of March 2024, Plants of the World Online accepted the following species:

- Hormuzakia aggregata (Lehm.) Guşul.
- Hormuzakia limbata (Boiss.) Guşul.
- Hormuzakia negevensis (Danin) Danin & Hilger
