= Munteni (disambiguation) =

Munteni may refer to several places in Romania:

- Munteni, a commune in Galați County
- Munteni, a village in Bulz Commune, Bihor County
- Munteni, a village in Belcești Commune, Iași County
- Munteni, a village in Văleni Commune, Neamț County
- Munteni, a village in Mihăești Commune, Vâlcea County
- Munteni-Buzău, a commune in Ialomița County
- Muntenii de Jos, a commune in Vaslui County
- Muntenii de Sus, a commune in Vaslui County

and to:

- Munteni, a village in Lipoveni Commune, Cimișlia district, Moldova
