= Dragoș Vodă National College =

Dragoș Vodă National College may refer to one of two high schools in Romania:

- Dragoș Vodă National College (Câmpulung Moldovenesc)
- Dragoș Vodă National College (Sighetu Marmației)
