= Bosanci, Suceava =

Bosanci
- Commune
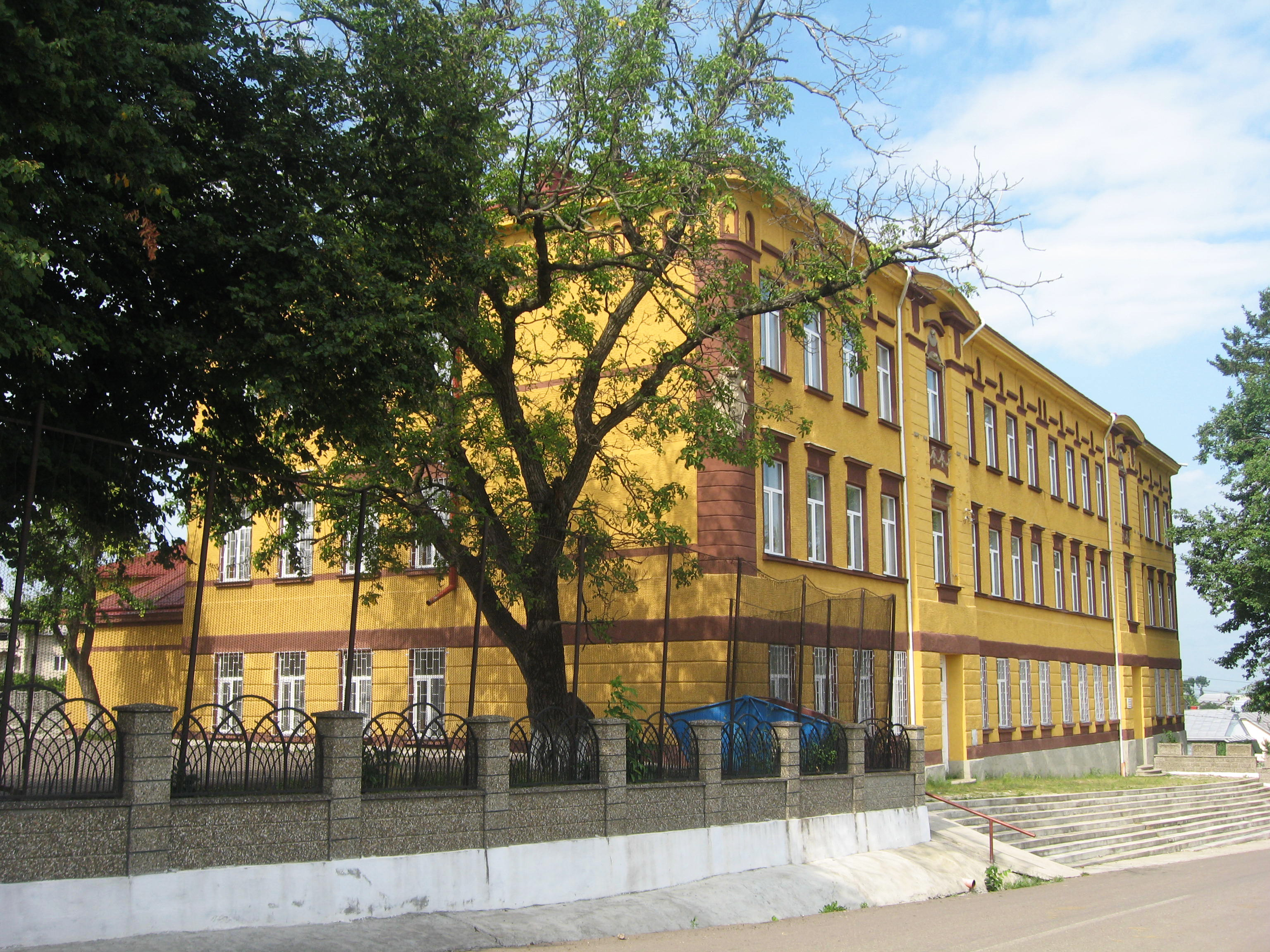
- Bosanci secondary school

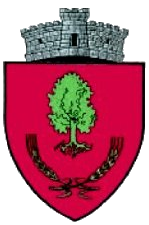
- Coat of arms

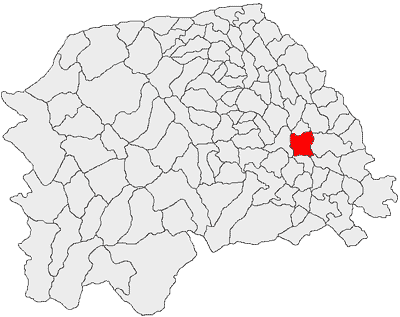
- Location in Suceava County

- Location in Romania
- Coordinates: 47°35′N 26°19′E
- Country: Romania
- County: Suceava

Government
  - Mayor (2020–2024): Neculai Miron (PNL)
- Area: 49.67 km^{2} (19.18 sq mi)
- Elevation: 328 m (1,076 ft)
- Population (2021-12-01): 6,802
  - Density: 136.9/km^{2} (354.7/sq mi)
- Time zone: UTC+02:00 (EET)
  - Summer (DST): UTC+03:00 (EEST)
- Postal code: 727045
- Area code: +(40) 230
- Vehicle reg.: SV
- Website: comunabosanci.ro

Bosanci (Polish: Boszańce, German: Bossancze), previously known as Bosancea, is a commune located in Suceava County, Bukovina, northeastern Romania. It is composed of two villages, Bosanci and Cumpărătura.

== Natives ==
- Teofil Sauciuc-Săveanu (1884 – 1971), epigrapher, archaeologist, and historian
