= Dumitru Caracostea =

Romanian folklorist, literary historian and critic

Dumitru Caracostea (March 10, 1879–June 2, 1964) was a Romanian folklorist, literary historian and critic.

== Biography ==
=== Origins and early career ===
He was born in Slatina, Olt County to Nicolae Caracostea, a magistrate of Aromanian descent, and his wife Eufrosina (née Bichan), a French teacher. His father's family had become wealthy through engaging in commerce, which opened the possibility of higher education for its members. He attended primary school and one year of high school in his native town, completing his secondary education at Saint Sava High School in Bucharest in 1900. That year, he enrolled in the literature and philosophy faculty of the University of Bucharest, which he attended intermittently: in 1902, he was working as a clerk at the court of auditors, abandoning his studies for a time. In 1905, he married Lucia Walter of Iași, which likely further detained him from educational pursuits. She came from an eminently respectable family and was a university graduate in literature; she was some three years his junior, and the couple were classmates. The marriage would result in two children.

Only in 1906 did he return to university, and graduated first in his class in 1908. His professors included Titu Maiorescu, Ioan Bianu, and Ovid Densusianu; their influence on his intellectual development was decisive. In 1909, Caracostea obtained a scholarship for the University of Vienna, where he studied under the direct supervision of Wilhelm Meyer-Lübke. He successfully defended two doctoral theses in 1913: one on philosophy, the other on Romance philology. He returned home upon the outbreak of World War I. From 1914 to 1925, he was a high school teacher. In 1920, he began offering courses at the University of Bucharest, first as associate professor in Bianu's department and, from 1930, as full professor at the department of modern Romanian literature and folklore. Thanks to his efforts, the Institute of Literary History and Folklore was founded in 1933; among other publications, a series of "literary confessions" by contemporary Romanian writers appeared under its aegis.

=== Wartime activity and downfall ===
Caracostea was elected a titular member of the Romanian Academy in 1938, and presided over the forum's literary section for a time. During the summer of 1940, he served as Minister of National Education in two successive cabinets: under Ion Gigurtu from July 4 to September 4, and under Ion Antonescu from September 4 to 14, until the establishment of the National Legionary State. That autumn, the new regime appointed him head of Revista Fundațiilor Regale; as such, he suspended contributions from critics whom he deemed sympathetic toward Jewish literature. From April 1941 to May 1944. three months before the coup against Antonescu, he headed the amalgamated Royal Foundations. His ascendancy under Romania's wartime regimes was not due to politics: he had participated neither in the main parties nor in pro-fascist groups, but remained loyal to the ideas of Nicolae Iorga. Instead, it stemmed from the Germanophilia that had begun during his Vienna days. Caracostea's activity at the magazine was curtailed by the fact that he had to issue a monthly report both to the Anglophile Royal House and to the pro-German Antonescu. Its situation was precarious: circulation had dropped to 800, issues appeared at delayed intervals and mobilization made contributors difficult to find. In 1948, the new communist regime stripped him of Academy membership. Initially tried and sentenced together with other officials who served until 1944, he was arrested in 1950 and held at Sighet prison until 1955, this time without trial. His release certificate does not feature an arrest warrant record or the motive for his detention, an implicit admission that there was no legal basis for his arrest or detention. In June 1964, aged 85, he was at home discussing with a former student about the latter's thesis. Suddenly feeling unwell, he died of an internal hemorrhage after half an hour.

Magazines that published his work include Adevărul literar și artistic, Convorbiri Literare, Drum drept, Flacăra, Gândirea, Langue et littérature, Mitteilungen des Rumänische Instituts und der Universität (Vienna), Revista Fundațiilor Regale, Vieața nouă and Viața Românească. His literary and scientific activity had two main directions: studies of folklore (Miorița în Moldova, Muntenia și Oltenia, 1924) and exegeses of Mihai Eminescu's work (Arta cuvântului la Eminescu, 1938; Creativitatea eminesciană, 1943). His writings on folk ballads (Balada poporană română, 1932–1933) laid the groundwork for geographic-based folklore studies, then a new concept. His commentary on Eminescu was marked by a binary perspective: dynamic (the poems' genesis) and static (the poet's artistic use of language).
