= Vasile Gheorghiu =

Romanian theologian

Vasile Gheorghiu (16 June 1872 – 29 November 1959) was an Austro-Hungarian-born Romanian theologian.

Born in Câmpulung Moldovenesc, then part of Austrian-ruled Bukovina, he attended the Romanian Orthodox high school in Suceava from 1882 to 1890, followed by the theology faculty of Czernowitz University from 1890 to 1984, receiving a doctorate there in 1897. From 1897 to 1899, he attended specialized courses at the Roman Catholic and Protestant theology faculties in Vienna, Bonn, Breslau, and Leipzig. In 1901, he was hired as assistant professor at Czernowitz' Biblical studies and New Testament exegesis department within the theology faculty. Rising to associate professor in 1905 and full professor in 1909, he remained on the faculty until his retirement in 1938. He served as faculty dean on three occasions. Meanwhile, he was ordained a priest in 1896, rising to archpriest in 1908. From 1911 to 1914, and again from 1923 to 1933, he edited and later directed Candela magazine, and also headed the editing committee of Păstorul church newsletter. From 1921 to 1929, he was president of the Bukovina society for the culture and literature of the Romanian people, and also served as president of the Orthodox clergy association of Bukovina.

Elected an honorary member of the Romanian Academy in 1938, he was stripped membership in 1948 by the new communist regime. Gheorghiu was among the leading Romanian New Testament theologians. He wrote detailed works of introduction and exegesis on the subject, also publishing on Biblical chronology and theology. Close to a hundred of his studies, articles, sermons and reviews appeared in Candela, and in two other newsletters late in his life. A series of commentaries on books of the New Testament remains in manuscript, as does his most important work, a critical edition of the entire New Testament. Other manuscripts were lost in 1940, during the Soviet occupation of Northern Bukovina. He died in Cut, Neamț County.

== Selected works ==
- Gheorghiu, Vasile (1901). Der Brief des Judas: einleitung und Commentar. Czernowitz: Heinrich Pardini. OCLC 31247401.
- ——— (1922). Sf. Evangelie după Mateiu: cu comentar. Cernăuți: Editura autorului. OCLC 935615299.
- ——— (1929). Introducerea în Sfintele Cărți ale Testamentului Nou. Cernăuți: Editura autorului & Tipografia Mitropolitul Silvestru. OCLC 935387991.
- ——— (1939). Codex Argenteus Upsaliensis. Academia Româna. Studii și Cercetări. Vol. 39. Bucuresti. OCLC 482237807.
- ——— (1940). Lectionarul evangelic grecesc din Iași "Ms: 194". Academia Româna. Studii și Cercetări. Vol. 41. Bucuresti. OCLC 483077135.
