= Zenovie Pâclișanu =

Austro-Hungarian-born Romanian historian, diplomat and cleric

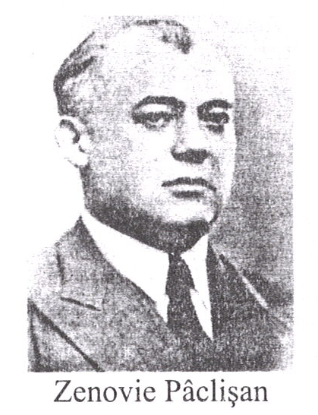

Zenovie Pâclișanu (1 May 1886 – 1957 or 1958) was an Austro-Hungarian-born Romanian historian, diplomat and cleric. A native of Transylvania, he completed a doctorate at Vienna, and during the 1910s was active in the cultural and religious life of Blaj. Following the creation of Greater Romania, which he enthusiastically supported, he became a civil servant, twice taking part in treaty negotiations. After World War II, the new communist regime suppressed his Greek-Catholic Church and threw Pâclișanu in prison, where he died. His work, banned under communism but partly re-edited in the years since, focuses on the history of Transylvania between the 17th and 19th centuries, particularly in the religious sphere.

== Biography ==
=== Origins, education and early activity ===
Born into a family of Greek-Catholic peasants in Straja, Alba County, in the Transylvania region, he attended the Romanian high school in Blaj. Upon graduating in 1906, he enrolled in the theology faculty of Budapest University, which he completed in 1910. In 1912, he defended a doctoral thesis at the University of Vienna's theology faculty. Written in Latin and titled Relatio Rumenorum e terris coronae S[ancti] Stephani ad Reformationem saec[ulis] XVI et XVII, it dealt with interconfessional relations in Transylvania during the Reformation. It was a pioneering work, both due to the archival investigations the author undertook (and which brought to light valuable documents) as well as to the new historiographical and cultural vision of Pâclișanu. The thesis had a decisive impact on his view of history, and he continued using his research for this document in subsequent studies. In 1913, he took a study trip to Switzerland, France and Germany.

Between 1911 and 1920, Pâclișanu taught history and theology at the seminary in Blaj, and was also the first director of the town's central library, working there from 1916 to 1919. By this time an ordained priest, he served at the Holy Trinity Cathedral. For a time, he directed Unirea newspaper. Writing history at a constant pace for Cultura Creștină magazine from its first numbers in 1911–1912, Pâclișanu showed a firm grasp of his material while sharply criticizing both earlier and contemporary historiography. He participated in the province's cultural life, using his oratorical talent to deliver lectures under the aegis of Astra. He also maintained ties to the Romanian Old Kingdom, joining the Cultural League for the Unity of All Romanians and attending the summer courses taught by Nicolae Iorga at Vălenii de Munte. There, his interactions with other historians helped shape his ideas, and he forged a close friendship with Vasile Pârvan.

=== In Greater Romania ===
In 1916, the Austro-Hungarian authorities arrested Pâclișanu on a charge of high treason. They alleged he had spied for Romania, which had recently entered World War I, by offering information to its army. One of twelve Romanian intellectuals arrested in Transylvania, he was freed after five weeks. A committed supporter of the union of Transylvania with Romania, ratified in December 1918 at Alba Iulia, he was present at the occasion as secretary of the Blaj Romanian National Council's executive committee. In 1919, he was elected a corresponding member of the Romanian Academy, becoming one of several Transylvanians admitted that June.

From 1920 to 1922, he headed the Cluj branch of the State Archives. Pâclișanu then worked as a manager at the Education and Religious Affairs Ministry from 1922 to 1948. He helped draft the 1927 Concordat, and in 1929 led a Romanian delegation to the Vatican on a diplomatic mission. For his efforts in improving church-state relations, Pope Pius XI named Pâclișanu a monsignor.

=== World War II activity and communist persecution ===
During the 1930s and '40s, Pâclișanu held a number of other government posts, heading the Education Ministry's arts office (1930), the minorities section of the prime minister's press bureau (1931), the minorities office at the Education Ministry and then the Religious Affairs and Arts Ministry, leaving in March 1942. For the following two years, he directed the studies and documentaries department of the Propaganda Ministry, also heading a section of the Institute of National History. After a ministerial reorganization in the summer of 1944, he and his department were transferred to the Foreign Ministry. There, he was given the title of cultural adviser within the press, propaganda and information cultural directorate. He also headed the minister's office of studies. A member Romanian delegation to the 1946 Paris Peace Conference, he sat on the political-judicial committee. In this capacity, he served as adviser on Transylvanian history; Gheorghe Tătărescu and Gheorghe Gheorghiu-Dej asked him for information that would bolster Romania's claim over the entirety of the region.

In 1948, the new communist regime stripped him of Academy membership. The same year, the Greek-Catholic Church was outlawed, and after the arrest of Tit Liviu Chinezu and Vasile Aftenie, the papal nuncio named him general metropolitan vicar over the church members in Wallachia, Oltenia and Moldavia. Repeatedly arrested, Pâclișanu was brutally tortured by the Securitate secret police in the Interior Ministry building and at Jilava Prison. He was tried and sentenced for clandestine religious activity. During the trial, where he had no lawyer, he retracted the confessions he had made under duress. One account suggests he was beaten to death as a result of his recantation; another indicates that, weakened by torture, he died at Văcărești Prison during his second period of detention. Pâclișanu was initially interred at Jilava; his widow was eventually able to bury the body at Bellu Catholic cemetery. His son, sentenced to death in absentia, managed to flee to the United States, where he became a psychiatrist in Philadelphia. His daughter married a scion of the Wallachian boyar Miclescu family, and the couple settled in France. His widow died in Bucharest.

== Work and legacy ==
Pâclișanu's research interests included ecclesiastical history, the Romanian national movement in Transylvania during the 18th century and the territorial revisionism of national minorities. His work on Transylvanian history from the 17th to the 19th century is important; he was an expert on the local Romanian church during the Reformation, interconfessional relations, the Romanian church hierarchy and the Enlightenment, and the national awakening of Transylvania's Romanians. Pâclișanu sought to move beyond confessional partisanship against the Romanian Orthodox Church, instead treating the history of the Greek-Catholic Church with a new methodology.

His publications include: Biserica și românismul. Studiu istoric (1910), the better known Vechile Mănăstiri Românești din Ardeal (1919), Alegerea Arhiereilor. Notițe istorice (1920), Propaganda catolică între românii din Ardeal și Ungaria înainte de 1500. Studiu istoric (1920), Din istoria bisericească a Românilor ardeleni. "Teologul" vlădicilor uniți (1700–1773). Studiu istoric cu anexe documentare (1923), Luptele politice ale Românilor ardeleni din anii 1790 – 1792. Studiu istoric cu anexe documentare (1923), Corespondența din exil a episcopului Inochentie Micu Klein, 1746 – 1768 (1924), Documente privitoare la istoria școalelor din Blaj (1930), Mișcările revizioniste în Statele europene în cursul anului 1931 (1932), Problema statutului minorităților (1935), Un vechi proces literar (Relațiile lui I. Bob cu S. Klein, Gh. Șincai și P. Maior) (1935), and Istoria creștinismului antic (1937). Following the cession of Northern Transylvania to Hungary imposed by the Second Vienna Award, his writings increased in frequency and virulence. He published works in German, Italian and French regarding Hungarian minority policy. Three late articles published in Revista Istorică Română retain their interest: "In jurul ierarhiei Românilor ardeleni în secolul XV" (1943), "Vechile districte românești de peste munți" (1943) and "Din corespondența doctorului Ioan Rațiu" (1944).

With the onset of the Communist regime, Pâclișanu's work was banned in its entirety, and appeared only in fragmentary form in exile publications, particularly Catholic ones based at Rome. One of his wartime texts was published in the United States in 1985 as Hungary's Struggle to Annihilate its National Minorities. Based on Secret Hungarian Documents. He left in manuscript form the monumental church history Istoria Bisericii Române Unite, published only in 2006, as well as a lengthy series of studies. Although some historians began to cite his writings in more or less subversive manner after the slight cultural thaw in the early years of the Nicolae Ceaușescu era, his work never fully re-entered the academic mainstream. Nevertheless, a systematic attempt to recover his work began after the Romanian Revolution of 1989. Biserica și românismul was republished in 2005, while his doctoral thesis was printed in 2010, both in the Latin original and in a Romanian translation.
