= Teofil Sauciuc-Săveanu =

Austro-Hungarian-born Romanian epigrapher, archaeologist and historian

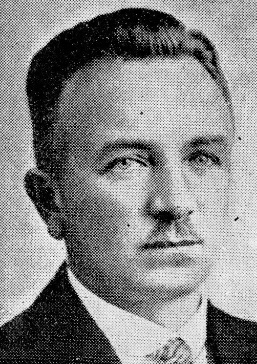
Teofil Sauciuc-Săveanu.

Teofil Sauciuc-Săveanu (October 21, 1884–July 26, 1971) was an Austro-Hungarian-born Romanian epigrapher, archaeologist and historian.

Born in Bosanci, a village south of Suceava in the Duchy of Bukovina, he came from an old Romanian family of the Storojineț area, originally called Sava. His parents were Teofil, an Orthodox priest, and Maria. He attended primary school in Iordănești near Storojineț from 1890 to 1894, followed by a state high school in Cernăuți from 1894 to 1902. He studied philosophy at Czernowitz and Vienna Universities from 1902 to 1906, specializing in classical philology. He was a high school teacher from 1909 to 1919. He took a doctorate in letters and philosophy from Vienna in 1909, and was named Privatdozent at Czernowitz in 1913. The Austrian Archaeological Institute awarded him a scholarship to study abroad; from 1910 to 1912, he was based at the Austrian Archaeological Institute at Athens, during which time he visited Andros, Crete, Asia Minor, Sicily and the Italian peninsula. Upon the outbreak of World War I, he was mobilized into a hussar regiment in the Austro-Hungarian Army. Due to rising nationalist sentiment, family members decided to change their Ukrainized or Polonized name of Sauciuc to the unmistakably Romanian one of Săveanu. The scholar went along, but because eliminating his original name from military records would have posed problems, opted for a double name. In early 1918, in Cernăuți, he married Vera, the daughter of Teodor Tarnavschi.

In 1919, following the union of Bukovina with Romania, he was named substitute professor of ancient history at Cernăuți University. From 1920 to 1940, he was full professor of history and epigraphy within the classical philology department, serving as dean in 1921–1922. From 1924 to 1926, he was substitute professor at the music and dramatic arts conservatory. Following the Soviet occupation of Northern Bukovina, he was a professor at the University of Bucharest from 1940 to 1947. He was head of the ancient history and epigraphy department within the letters and philosophy department, serving as vice dean (1941) and dean (1946). He was director of the National Museum of Antiquities. He authored studies of Dobrudja, including Callatis, the ruins of which he helped discover; and of Athenian history. These appeared in specialty publications domestically and abroad, such as Analele Dobrogei, Viața Românească, Revista istorică română, Buletinul Comisiunii Monumentelor Istorice, Studii și cercetări de istorie veche and Revue des études sud-est européennes. He was known outside Romania as an epigrapher and a historian of Ancient Greece and Rome. He published 77 works about epigraphy, archaeology and history, and six about society and politics. He wrote about Greek and Latin epigraphy, archaeology, history, numismatics, hardstone carving, ancient metrology and heraldry. His monograph on Callatis, totaling 589 typewritten pages, remains in manuscript.

Within the government, he was undersecretary of state (1928-1930, 1932–1933) and ministerial director for Bukovina (1930-1931). From 1926 to 1938, he headed the Bukovina chapter of the National Peasants' Party. He was elected to the Assembly of Deputies in 1926 and 1927, and to the Senate in 1931, 1932 and 1933. In 1928, he was made a commander of the Order of the Crown of Romania, one of several awards he received. He was an honorary member of the Romanian Numismatic Society from 1934, and a corresponding member of the Austrian and German Archaeological Institutes. Elected a corresponding member of the Romanian Academy in May 1945, he was purged in 1948 by the early communist regime and reinstated posthumously in 1990. Due to his political activity, he was incarcerated by the regime at Sighet Prison from 1950, securing release in October 1956. He was held without trial, as was his daughter. He died in Bucharest.
