= Constantin N. Hurmuzachi =

Austro-Hungarian-born Romanian biologist

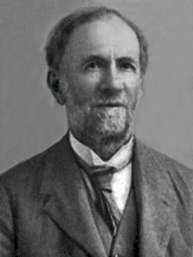
Hurmuzachi in 1930

Constantin Nicolae Hurmuzachi (October 3, 1863–February 22, 1937) was an Austro-Hungarian-born Romanian biologist.

Born in Cernăuți to Natalia and Nicolae Hurmuzachi, he joined the Zoological and Botanical Society of Vienna while still a schoolboy. He graduated high school in his native city in 1881. After studying at the philosophy faculty of Czernowitz University for a year, he transferred to the law faculty, studying there from 1882 to 1885. He left for the University of Vienna that year, taking a law degree in 1886. In 1888, he was hired by the finance office in Cernăuți. He sat in the Diet of Bukovina from 1910 to 1914. He left for Vienna in 1914, working at the Botanical Institute and the Zoological Society, researching fauna. In 1918, he was elected to the National Romanian Council of Bukovina. In 1919, he was elected an honorary member of the Romanian Academy. In 1925, he returned to his native province, by now part of Greater Romania. He divided his estate at Ropcea among the peasants and dedicated himself to studying the flora and fauna of northern Romania.

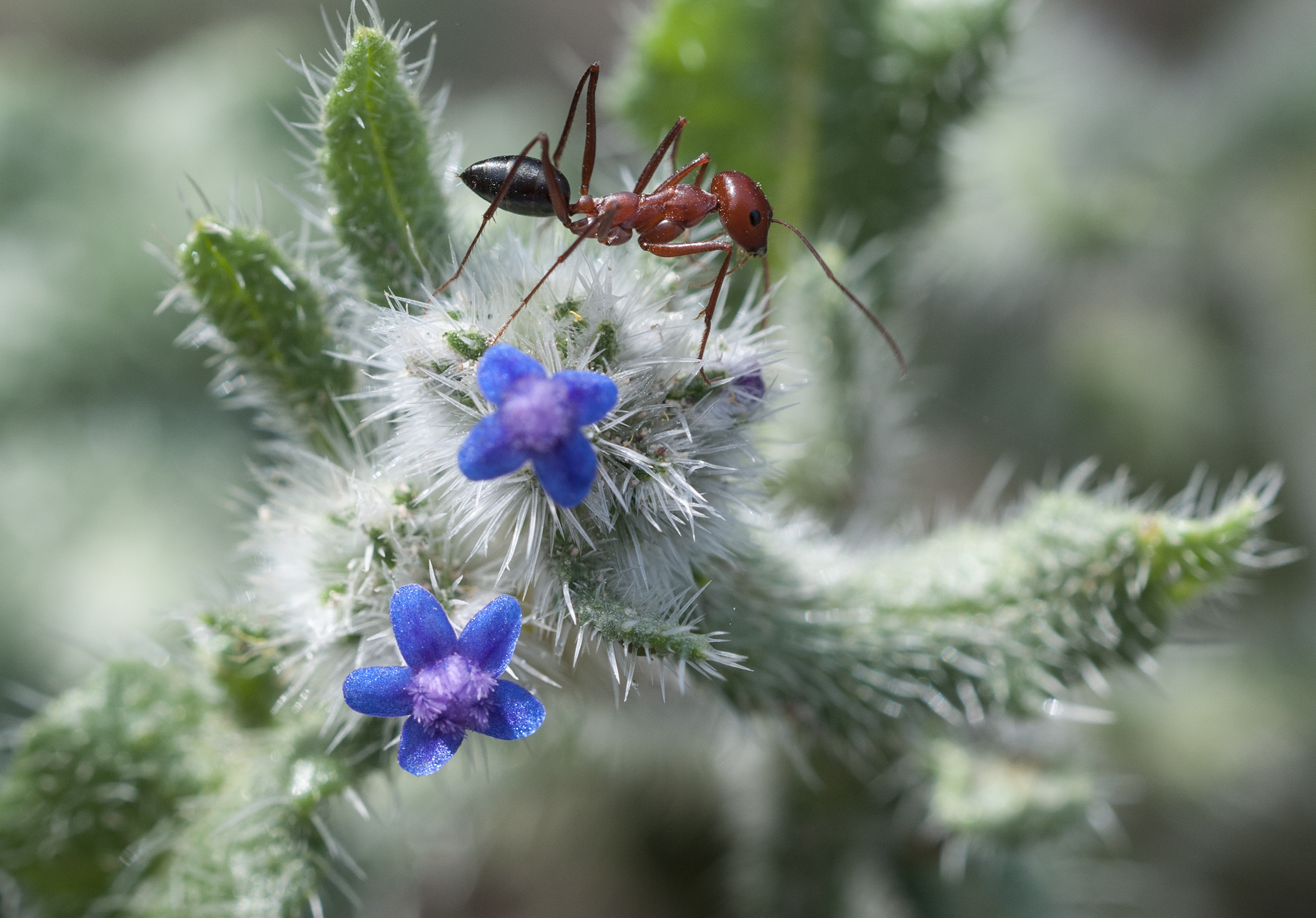
Hormuzakia aggregata is a plant named after Hurmuzachi

His chief interest was in entomology, particularly the Lepidoptera and Coleoptera of Romania. Over fifty years of intense research led Hurmuzachi to publish over ninety studies in German, French, and Romanian, mainly of Lepidoptera. His monographs on the Morphocarabus subgenus and on the Melitaea and Erebia genera broke new ground. He described new species of butterflies from Bukovina. In 1897, he published the first biogeographical map in Romanian, showing the flora, fauna and climate of Bukovina. In 1931, he was named a professor at the science faculty of the University of Cernăuți, where he held Romania's first university-level course on biogeography. He died in Cernăuți.
