= Victor Bădulescu =

Romanian economist (1892–1953)

Victor V. Bădulescu
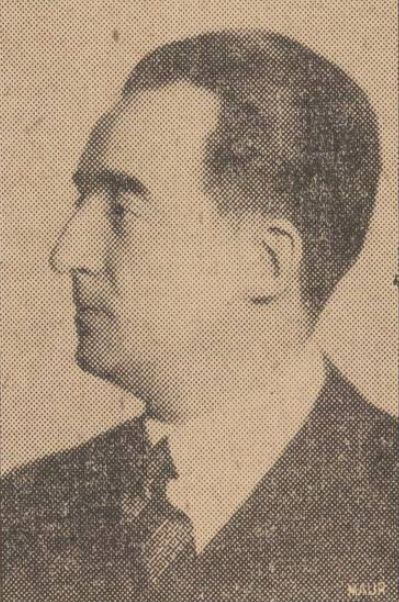
- Victor Bădulescu
- Born: July 28, 1892; Găești, Dâmbovița County, Kingdom of Romania
- Died: December 10, 1953 (aged 61); Sighet Prison, Romanian People's Republic
- Occupations: Economist, lawyer, diplomat

Academic background
- Education: Gheorghe Lazăr High School
- Alma mater: Sciences Po; University of Paris
- Thesis: Les finances publiques en Roumanie (1923)

Academic work
- Institutions: Academy of Higher-level Commercial and Industrial Studies; University of Bucharest

Victor V. Bădulescu (July 28, 1892–December 10, 1953) was a Romanian economist, lawyer, and diplomat who was elected as a corresponding member of the Romanian Academy.

Born in Găești, Bădulescu attended the Gheorghe Lazăr High School in Bucharest, graduating in 1911. He studied at the School of Political Sciences in Paris, obtaining a degree in Economics in 1914, after which he studied Law at the University of Paris. When Romania entered World War I in 1916 on the side of the Allies, he went back to his home country, enlisted in officer school, and participated in the war, being promoted to captain. Upon returning to Paris, he published several studies and obtained in 1923 his doctorate in economic and political sciences from the Faculty of Law, with thesis Les finances publiques en Roumanie. He then taught at the Academy of Higher-level Commercial and Industrial Studies in Bucharest and in 1927 he became a lecturer in the Department of Political Economy and Finance of the Faculty of Law at the University of Bucharest, where he established in 1942 the Department of Economic Policy. From 1928 to 1935 he was also director of the Banca de Credit Român.

After World War I, Bădulescu joined the National Liberal Party. In September 1925, he became a financial expert of the Romanian delegation to the League of Nations and participated in the financial and commercial negotiations carried out within it. In 1926 he was a member of the Romanian delegation in London (headed by Nicolae Titulescu) for the regulation of war reparations. Subsequently, he was appointed a permanent member of the Economic Council of the Little Entente and of the Balkan Pact, and served in the Economic Council of the League of Nations for four years. Between June 1927 and November 1928, he was general secretary of the Ministry of Finance.

From 1934 to 1937, he served in governments headed by Prime Minister Gheorghe Tătărescu. Bădulescu was undersecretary of the Ministry of Finance of Romania from February 7, 1935 to August 29, 1936, when he was appointed undersecretary of the Ministry of Foreign Affairs, a position he held until December 28, 1937. In September 1936, the American chargé d'affaires in Romania, Frederick P. Hibbard, complained to him of the diminishing volume of United States export trade to Romania, "caused by the artificial barriers of clearing agreements exchange restrictions and import quotas"; Bădulescu expressed his regrets for this condition, which he attributed to "the inability of the Romanian government to secure dollars." Two months later, he signed, together with U.S. Ambassador Leland B. Harrison, an extradition treaty between Romania and the United States.

In 1946, after the end of World War II, Bădulescu was part of the Romanian delegation to the Paris Peace Conference as a technical expert. He also participated at the United Nations in the financial and commercial negotiations related to the payment of Romania's debts. On May 24, 1945, he was elected corresponding member of the Romanian Academy, but was expelled in 1948 after the onset of Communist rule. After being arrested by the Communist authorities on the night of May 5–6, 1950, he was sent to Sighet Prison, where he died on December 10, 1953.

== Works ==
- Le prélèvement sur le capital en Autriche (lois des 21 Juillet 1920, 27 Janvier et 8 mars 1921) (in French), Paris: Marcel Giard, 1921, OCLC 953997010
- Le prélèvement extraordinaire sur le capital dans l'Empire allemand (in French), Paris: Marcel Giard, 1922, OCLC 953997010
- Les finances publiques en Roumanie (in French), Paris: Marcel Giard, 1923, OCLC 1103492864
- Situația financiară a căilor ferate (in Romanian), București: Atelierele "Adeverul", 1924, OCLC 38781213
- Probleme monetare internaționale. Vol. 1, Conferința monetară internațională dela Bretton Woods (U.S.A.), Iulie 1944 (in Romanian), Craiova: Scrisul Românesc, 1944, OCLC 1103455230
- Tratat de politică comercială. Comerț exterior și schimburi internaționale (in Romanian), Craiova: Scrisul Românesc, 1945, OCLC 935374885

== See also ==
- List of purged members of the Romanian Academy
