= List of purged members of the Romanian Academy =

In 1948, the new Romanian Communist regime undertook a political purge of the members of the Romanian Academy. In all, 113 members were removed that June, representing over two-thirds of the total membership at the beginning of the year. Fifty-five members of the "old" academy, mainly scientists, were admitted into the "new" one. In 1990 and 1994, following the Romanian Revolution, 97 of the purged members were restored to the academy, post-mortem. This list presents the names of the purged members, along with the names of those who died in prison and those who spent time in prison.

== Purged members (113) ==
=== Titular members (26) ===
==== Literature section (8) ====
| Name | year elected |
|---|---|
| Petre Antonescu | 1945 |
| Lucian Blaga | 1936 |
| Theodor Capidan | 1935 |
| Dumitru Caracostea | 1938 |
| Ștefan Ciobanu | 1918 |
| Nichifor Crainic | 1940 |
| Ion Petrovici | 1934 |
| Constantin Rădulescu-Motru | 1923 |

==== History section (14) ====
| Name | year elected |
|---|---|
| Nicolae Bănescu | 1936 |
| Gheorghe I. Brătianu | 1942 |
| Nicolae Colan | 1942 |
| Alexandru Costin | 1948 |
| Silviu Dragomir | 1928 |
| Dimitrie Gusti | 1919 |
| Alexandru Lapedatu | 1918 |
| Ioan Lupaș | 1916 |
| Simion Mehedinți | 1915 |
| Petre P. Negulescu | 1936 |
| Ion Nistor | 1915 |
| Niculae M. Popescu | 1923 |
| Radu R. Rosetti | 1934 |
| Victor Slăvescu | 1939 |

==== Sciences section (4) ====
| Name | year elected |
|---|---|
| Horia Hulubei | 1946 |
| Gheorghe Ionescu-Sisești | 1936 |
| Constantin Motăș | 1948 |
| Nicolae Vasilescu-Karpen | 1923 |

=== Corresponding members (58) ===
==== Literature section (20) ====
| Name | year elected |
|---|---|
| Ion Agârbiceanu | 1919 |
| Nicolae Bagdasar | 1943 |
| Ioan A. Bassarabescu | 1909 |
| Marcu Beza | 1923 |
| Ștefan Bezdechi | 1945 |
| Constantin Brăiloiu | 1946 |
| Tiberiu Brediceanu | 1937 |
| Mihail Codreanu | 1942 |
| Onisifor Ghibu | 1919 |
| George Giuglea | 1936 |
| Pantelimon Halippa | 1918 |
| Adrian Maniu | 1933 |
| Alexandru Marcu | 1940 |
| Basil Munteanu | 1939 |
| Ion Mușlea | 1947 |
| Marin Simionescu-Râmniceanu | 1919 |
| Florian Ștefănescu-Goangă | 1937 |
| Ilie Torouțiu | 1936 |
| Alexandru Tzigara-Samurcaș | 1938 |
| Tudor Vianu | 1935 |

==== History section (19) ====
| Name | year elected |
|---|---|
| Victor Bădulescu | 1945 |
| Romulus Cândea | 1929 |
| Mihail Costăchescu | 1939 |
| Virgil Drăghiceanu | 1926 |
| George Fotino | 1945 |
| Vasile Grecu | 1936 |
| Scarlat Lambrino | 1934 |
| Sabin Manuilă | 1938 |
| Constantin Marinescu | 1928 |
| Ștefan Meteș | 1919 |
| Petre Panaitescu | 1934 |
| Zenovie Pâclișanu | 1919 |
| Vespasian Pella | 1941 |
| Nicolae Petrescu | 1945 |
| Ion Răducanu | 1936 |
| Nicolae Al. Rădulescu | 1948 |
| Teofil Sauciuc-Săveanu | 1945 |
| Gheorghe Tașcă | 1926 |
| Anibal Teodorescu | 1945 |

==== Sciences section (19) ====
| Name | year elected |
|---|---|
| Ion Atanasiu | 1940 |
| Eugen Botezat | 1913 |
| Nicolae Caranfil | 1940 |
| Alexandru Ciucă | 1946 |
| Dumitru Combiescu | 1946 |
| Gogu Constantinescu | 1920 |
| Mihai David | 1935 |
| Mihail Gușuleac | 1937 |
| Dragomir Hurmuzescu | 1916 |
| Nicolae Ionescu-Sișești | 1939 |
| Vintilă Mihăilescu | 1939 |
| Iuliu Moldovan | 1920 |
| Costin Nenițescu | 1945 |
| Octav Onicescu | 1938 |
| Ștefan Procopiu | 1948 |
| Petre Sergescu | 1937 |
| Sabba Ștefănescu | 1946 |
| Paul Teodorescu | 1938 |
| Victor Vâlcovici | 1936 |

=== Honorary members (29) ===
| Name | year elected |
|---|---|
| Constantin Angelescu | 1934 |
| Theodor Angheluță | 1948 |
| Axente Banciu | 1948 |
| Nicolae Bălan | 1920 |
| Mircea Cancicov | 1937 |
| Dimitrie Ciotori | 1936 |
| Negoiță Dănăilă | 1939 |
| Nicolae Donici | 1922 |
| Dionisie Germani | 1945 |
| Vasile Gheorghiu | 1938 |
| Arthur Gorovei | 1940 |
| Peter Hänggi | 2015 |
| Emil Hațieganu | 1945 |
| Prince Nicholas Hohenzollern | 1929 |
| Iuliu Hossu | 1945 |
| Constantin Karadja | 1946 |
| Constantin Lacea | 1939 |
| Ion Lapedatu | 1936 |
| Iuliu Maniu | 1919 |
| Gheorghe G. Mironescu | 1939 |
| Ioan Papp | 1946 |
| Traian Pop | 1948 |
| Constantin Popovici | 1946 |
| Nichita Smochină | 1942 |
| Marius Sturza | 1938 |
| Virgil Șotropa | 1943 |
| Gheorghe Tătărescu | 1937 |
| Grigore Tăușan | 1939 |
| George Udrischi | 1946 |
| Traian Vuia | 1946 |

== Purged members who died in prison (9) ==
| Name | year elected | class | born | died | prison |
|---|---|---|---|---|---|
| Gheorghe I. Brătianu | 1942 | titular | 1898 | 1953 | Sighet |
| Alexandru I. Lapedatu | 1918 | titular | 1876 | 1950 | Sighet |
| Radu R. Rosetti | 1934 | titular | 1877 | 1949 | Văcărești |
| Victor Bădulescu | 1945 | corresponding | 1892 | 1953 | Sighet |
| Alexandru Marcu | 1940 | corresponding | 1894 | 1955 | Văcărești |
| Zenovie Pâclișanu | 1919 | corresponding | 1886 | 1958 | Jilava |
| Gheorghe Tașcă | 1926 | corresponding | 1875 | 1951 | Sighet |
| Mircea Cancicov | 1937 | honorary | 1884 | 1958 | Râmnicu Sărat |
| Iuliu Maniu | 1919 | honorary | 1873 | 1953 | Sighet |

== Purged members who were incarcerated (30) ==
| Name | year elected | class | arrested | released | prison(s) |
|---|---|---|---|---|---|
| Dumitru Caracostea | 1938 | titular | 1950 | 1955 | Sighet |
| Nichifor Crainic | 1940 | titular | 1946 | 1952 | Jilava, Văcărești, Aiud |
| Silviu Dragomir | 1928 | titular | 1950 | 1955 | Sighet |
| Ioan Lupaș | 1916 | titular | 1950 | 1955 | Sighet |
| Constantin Motâș | 1948 | titular | 1956 | 1956 | Aiud |
| Ion Nistor | 1915 | titular | 1950 | 1955 | Sighet |
| Ion Petrovici | 1934 | titular | 1949 | 1958 | Aiud |
| Constantin Rădulescu-Motru | 1923 | titular | 1949 | 1949 | Turnu Severin |
| Victor Slăvescu | 1939 | titular | 1950 | 1955 | Sighet |
| George Fotino | 1945 | corresponding | 1950 | 1952 | Jilava, Sighet |
| Onisifor Ghibu | 1919 | corresponding | 1945 | 1945 | Caracal |
| Pantelimon Halippa | 1918 | corresponding | 1950 | 1957 | Sighet, Aiud |
| Ștefan Meteș | 1919 | corresponding | 1950 | 1955 | Sighet |
| Iuliu Moldovan | 1920 | corresponding | 1950 | 1955 | Sighet |
| Ion Răducanu | 1936 | corresponding | 1959 | 1963 | Sighet |
| Teofil Sauciuc-Săveanu | 1945 | corresponding | 1950 | 1955 | Sighet |
| Florian Ștefănescu-Goangă | 1937 | corresponding | 1950 | 1955 | Sighet |
| Anibal Teodorescu | 1945 | corresponding | 1950 | 1957 | Jilava |
| Paul Teodorescu | 1938 | corresponding | 1950 | 1954 | Jilava, Aiud |
| Emil Hațieganu | 1945 | honorary | 1950 | 1955 | Gherla, Sighet, Jilava, Văcărești, Ocnele Mari |
| Iuliu Hossu | 1945 | honorary | 1949 | 1955 | Căldărușani, Sighet |
| Gheorghe Tătărescu | 1937 | honorary | 1950 | 1955 | Sighet |
