= Berghin =

- Commune
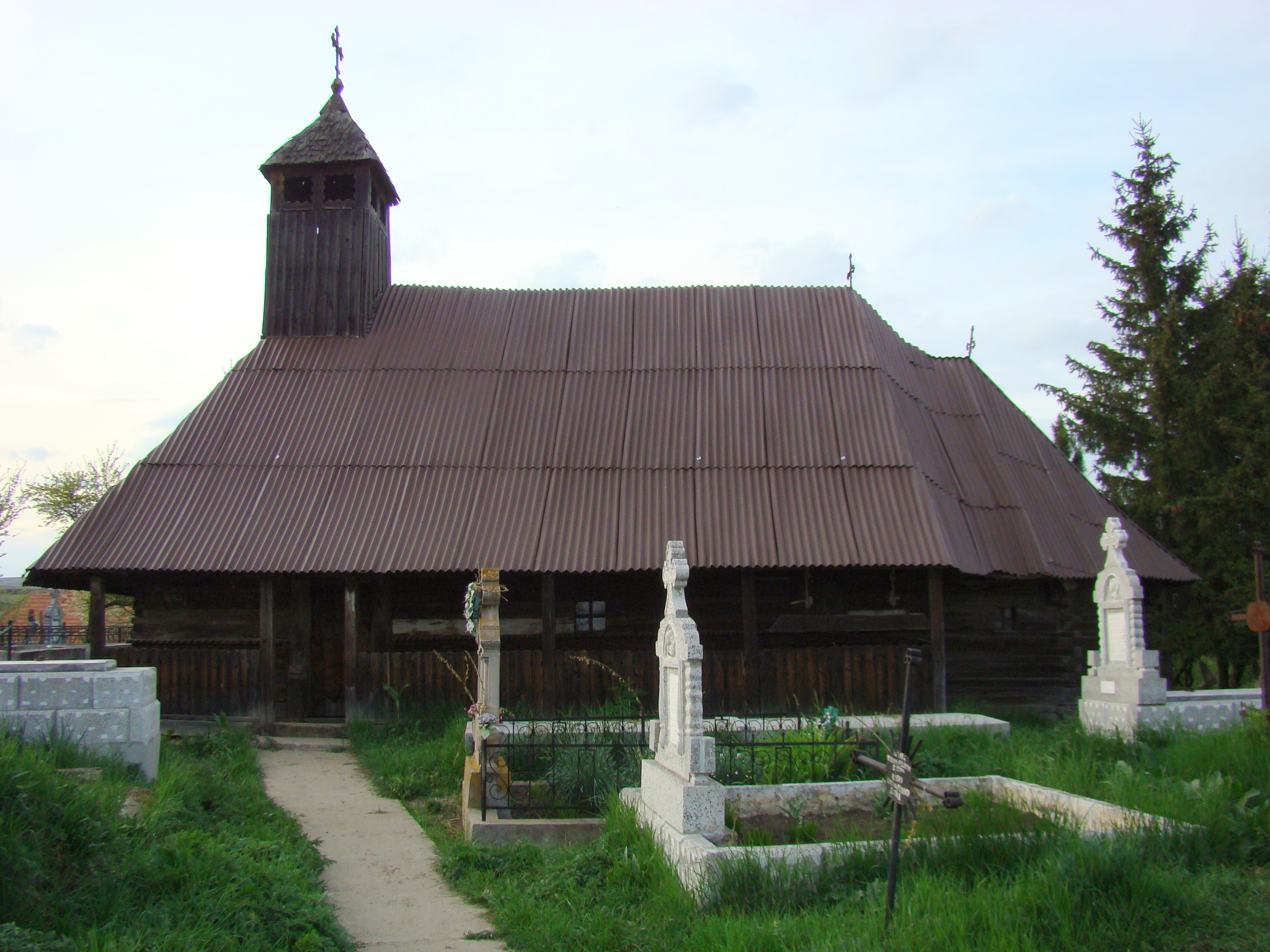
- Wooden church in Ghirbom

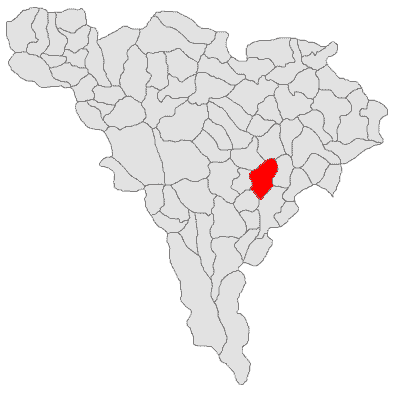
- Location in Alba County

- Location in Romania
- Coordinates: 46°04′N 23°44′E
- Country: Romania
- County: Alba

Government
  - Mayor (2020–2024): Vasile Bica (PDL)
- Area: 75.18 km^{2} (29.03 sq mi)
- Elevation: 382 m (1,253 ft)
- Population (2021-12-01): 1,672
  - Density: 22.24/km^{2} (57.60/sq mi)
- Time zone: UTC+02:00 (EET)
  - Summer (DST): UTC+03:00 (EEST)
- Postal code: 517110
- Area code: +40 x59
- Vehicle reg.: AB
- Website: comunaberghin.ro

Berghin (German: Blutroth; Hungarian: Berve) is a commune located in Alba County, Transylvania, Romania. It has a population of 1,672 (as of 2021) and is composed of four villages: Berghin, Ghirbom (Oláhgorbó), Henig (Henningsdorf; Henningfalva), and Straja (Őregyháza).

The commune is located in the east-central part of the county, on the left side of the Mureș River, about 16 km (10 mi) east of the county seat, Alba Iulia.

Historical population
Year	Pop.	±%
1850	3,817	—
1900	4,995	+30.9%
1930	5,583	+11.8%
1966	3,845	−31.1%
2002	2,169	−43.6%
2011	1,893	−12.7%
2021	1,672	−11.7%
Source: INS, Census data

At the 2021 census, Berghin had a population of 1,672. According to the census from 2011, the commune had a total population of 1,893; of those, 89.75% are ethnic Romanians, 4.28% ethnic Romani, and 1.27% are ethnic Germans.

The Ghirbom wooden church dates from 1688.

== Natives ==
- Zenovie Pâclișanu (1886–1957 or 1958), historian, diplomat, and cleric
