= George Sphrantzes =

15th-century Byzantine historian

George Sphrantzes, also Phrantzes or Phrantza (Greek: Γεώργιος Σφραντζῆς or Φραντζῆς; 30 August 1401 – c. 1478), was a late Byzantine Greek historian and Imperial courtier. He was an attendant to Emperor Manuel II Palaiologos, protovestiarites ("Lord of the Imperial Wardrobe") under John VIII Palaiologos, and a close confidant to Constantine XI Palaiologos, the last Byzantine emperor. He was an eyewitness of the fall of Constantinople in 1453, enslaved by the victorious Ottomans, but ransomed shortly afterwards. Sphrantzes served the surviving members of the Palaiologian family for the next several years until taking monastic vows in 1472. It was while a monk he wrote his history, which ends with the notice of Sultan Mehmed II's attempt to capture Naupaktos, which he dates to the summer of 1477; Sphrantzes is assumed to have died not long after that event.

== Life ==
George was born in Constantinople on 30 August 1401, during the second Ottoman blockade of the city; his godmother was the nun Thomais. In 1418 he was appointed attendant to Emperor Manuel. During his service to the Emperor Manuel, Sphrantzes did many favors for Constantine, developing a strong rapport with the future Emperor for, as he writes, "my uncle had been his tutor and my cousins and I were his companions, friends, and attendants." After the death of Manuel, he became the servant of Constantine and left with him 26 December 1427 when Constantine was appointed Despot of the Morea.

When they arrived in the Morea, Constantine made him governor of Glarentza, and Sphrantzes assisted Constantine in the latter's efforts to conquer the remainder of the Morea, but was captured 26 March 1429 in a skirmish outside of Patras and held prisoner until his relationship to Constantine was recognized, and he was paroled back to the Byzantine side to negotiate surrender of the citadel. While traveling to Epirus as an ambassador, to help arbitrate a peace between Carlo II Tocco and his uncle's illegitimate sons over the succession to rule over Epirus, he was kidnapped by Catalan pirates, along with his retinue, and held at Cephalonia until the pirates took the group back to Glarentza where they were ransomed. Upon returning to Constantinople, he was made protovestiarites and appointed ambassador by the Emperor.

After this point, Sphrantzes was a key supporter of Constantine. He attempted to secure Athens for his master in 1435; he negotiated Constantine's second marriage with Caterina Gattilusio in 1440; he was appointed prefect of Mistras in 1446; and most importantly he was sent on an embassy to Georgia and the Empire of Trebizond in search of a third wife for Emperor Constantine. During these duties he married Helena, the daughter of the imperial secretary Alexios Palaiologos Tzamplakon, and the Emperor Constantine was his best man. He was preparing to take his son John (and the larger part of his portable wealth) to the Morea, then to Cyprus, traveling by land "so that my son could visit the places and learn all those things which would be of use in his life" when the Ottoman sultan Mehmed II began his siege of Constantinople.

Despite being involved in the defense of the city, George Sphrantzes' account of the siege and capture of Constantinople in 1453 lacks much detail. About the death of Emperor Constantine, he writes simply, "in this capture my late master and emperor, Lord Constantine, was killed. I was not at his side at that hour but had been inspecting another part of the City, according to his orders." Sphrantzes was captured and made a slave, but was ransomed 1 September 1453 then made his way to Mistras. There he obtained protection at the court of Thomas Palaiologos, despot of the Morea. He managed to go to Adrianople in 1454, ransom his wife, and return to the Morea, while evading the Sultan Mehmed. He served as an ambassador to Venice on behalf of Thomas Palaiologos in 1455. After the fall of the Morea in 1460, Sphrantzes retired to the monastery of Tarchaneiotes in Corfu.

== Family ==
By Helena, he had five children, of whom two sons died in infancy, a third son Alexios died at the age of 5, while John and his only daughter Thamar lived to adulthood; the Emperor Constantine was godfather to both John and Thamar. Following the capture of Constantinople both children had become slaves of some elderly Turks, along with his wife Helena, and then were sold to the Sultan's Mir Ahor, or Master of Horse. However, before Sphrantzes could ransom them from the Mir Ahor, the Sultan learned of them and bought them. "Thus their wretched mother was left all alone in the company of a single nurse," Sphrantzes writes. Sphrantzes records he learned of his son's death, at the age of 14 years and a day short of eight months, on December 1453. Much later did Sphrantzes learn of his daughter Thamar's death in the Ottoman Imperial Harem in September 1455, aged 14 years and five months.

== Works ==
At the monastery he wrote his Chronicle (Χρονικόν), which details the history of the House of the Palaiologoi from 1401 to 1476. It is a very valuable authority for the events of his own times. The distinctive traits of his work are loyalty to the Palaiologoi -- Sphrantzes often exaggerated their merits and suppressed their defects -- hatred of the Turks, and devotion to Eastern Orthodoxy. Steven Runciman described his work as "honest, vivid and convincing" and that Sphrantzes "wrote good Greek in an easy unpretentious style."

There are editions by I. Bekker (1838) in the Corpus Scriptorum Historiae Byzantinae vol. 39, and in J. P. Migne, Patrologia Graeca vol. 156. The most recent critical edition of Sphrantzes is by Vasile Grecu (Bucharest, 1966), which appeared with a Romanian translation. Sphrantzes was also translated into German in 1954, and into English by Marios Philippides (Amherst, 1980). There is an edition with Italian translation by R. Maisano, Rome 1990 (CFHB 29).

For centuries it was believed that Sphrantzes wrote two works, one the Minor Chronicle and the other the Major Chronicle. The Major Chronicle, which also includes the origins of the Palaiologoi, is more detailed particularly about the siege of Constantinople. But, beginning in 1934, the research of such scholars as J.B. Falier-Papadopoulos, Franz Dölger, and Raymond-Joseph Loenertz demonstrated that the Major Chronicle was written decades later by Makarios Melissenos ("Pseudo-Sphrantzes"), a priest who fled to Naples from a Greek-Venetian island conquered by the Ottomans. Why Melissenos selected Sphrantzes to elaborate and expand upon is not clear.

== In popular culture ==
- Sphrantzes is portrayed in Rise of Empires: Ottoman, season 1, especially in the season finale.
- Hüseyin Isiklar portrayed George Sphrantzes in Mehmed: Sultan of Conquests.

== Bibliography ==
- Sphrantzes, George (1980). The fall of the Byzantine Empire: a chronicle by George Sphrantzes (1401–1477). Translated by Marios Philippides. Internet Archive. University of Massachusetts Press. p. 21. ISBN 978-0-87023-290-9.
