= Vestiaritai =

Byzantine guards and officials

The vestiaritai (Byzantine Greek: βεστιαρῖται, romanized: bestiarîtai, pronounced [ve.sti.aˈri.te]; sg. βεστιαρίτης, bestiarítēs, [ve.sti.aˈri.tis]) were a corps of imperial bodyguards and fiscal officials in the Byzantine Empire, attested from the 11th to the 15th centuries.

== History and functions ==
The vestiaritai appear in the mid-11th century, with the first known vestiarites, John Iberitzes, attested in 1049. As their name indicates, they had a connection to the imperial wardrobe and treasury, the vestiarion, probably initially raised as a guard detachment for it. From circa 1080 on, they were formally distinguished into two groups: the "inner" or "household" vestiaritai (eso or oikeioi vestiaritai), attached to the emperor's private treasury (the eso or oikeiakon vestiarion) under a megas primikerios, and the "outer" (exo vestiaritai) under a primikerios, who were probably under the public or state treasury (basilikon vestiarion). Gradually, they replaced various other groups of armed guards that the Byzantine emperors had employed inside Constantinople itself, such as the manglabitai or the pantheotai, and became the exclusive corps of the emperor's confidential agents. As the princess and historian Anna Komnene writes, they were the courtiers "closest" to the emperor. With the military crisis of the 1070s, they were also formed into a regular palace guard regiment, serving alongside the Varangian Guard in the Komnenian-era army.

The vestiaritai are attested as late as 1387, and likely continued to exist after. In the 13th and 14th centuries, however, their role was chiefly fiscal: they were responsible for levying soldiers and wagons from the provinces, under the control of the domestikos of the themes of the East. The chief of the vestiaritai was called protovestiarites (πρωτοβεστιαρίτης) in the 13th and 14th centuries (not to be confused with the much older and more important office of protovestiarios). The title is attested as late as 1451, when it was held by the historian George Sphrantzes. In the mid-14th century Book of Offices of Pseudo-Kodinos, it ranks nineteenth in the order of precedence, following the logothetes tou genikou. According to the same work, its insignia were: a wooden staff (dikanikion) with gold and red-gold knobs, a skiadion hat with embroidery of the klapoton type, another type of hat called skaranikon of white and gold silk with gold-wire embroidery and images of the emperor in the front and back, and a silk robe of office or kabbadion.

== Sources ==
- Bartusis, Mark C. (1997). The Late Byzantine Army: Arms and Society 1204–1453. Philadelphia, Pennsylvania: University of Pennsylvania Press. ISBN 0-8122-1620-2.
- Guilland, Rodolphe (1967). Recherches sur les institutions byzantines (2 vols.) [Studies on the Byzantine Institutions]. Berliner byzantinische Arbeiten 35 (in French). Berlin and Amsterdam: Akademie-Verlag & Adolf M. Hakkert. OCLC 878894516.
- Kazhdan, Alexander, ed. (1991). The Oxford Dictionary of Byzantium. Oxford and New York: Oxford University Press. ISBN 0-19-504652-8.
- Oikonomides, Nicolas (1976). Travaux et Mémoires 6 (in French). Paris: E. de Boccard.
- Verpeaux, Jean, ed. (1966). Pseudo-Kodinos, Traité des Offices (in French). Paris: Éditions du Centre National de la Recherche Scientifique.
