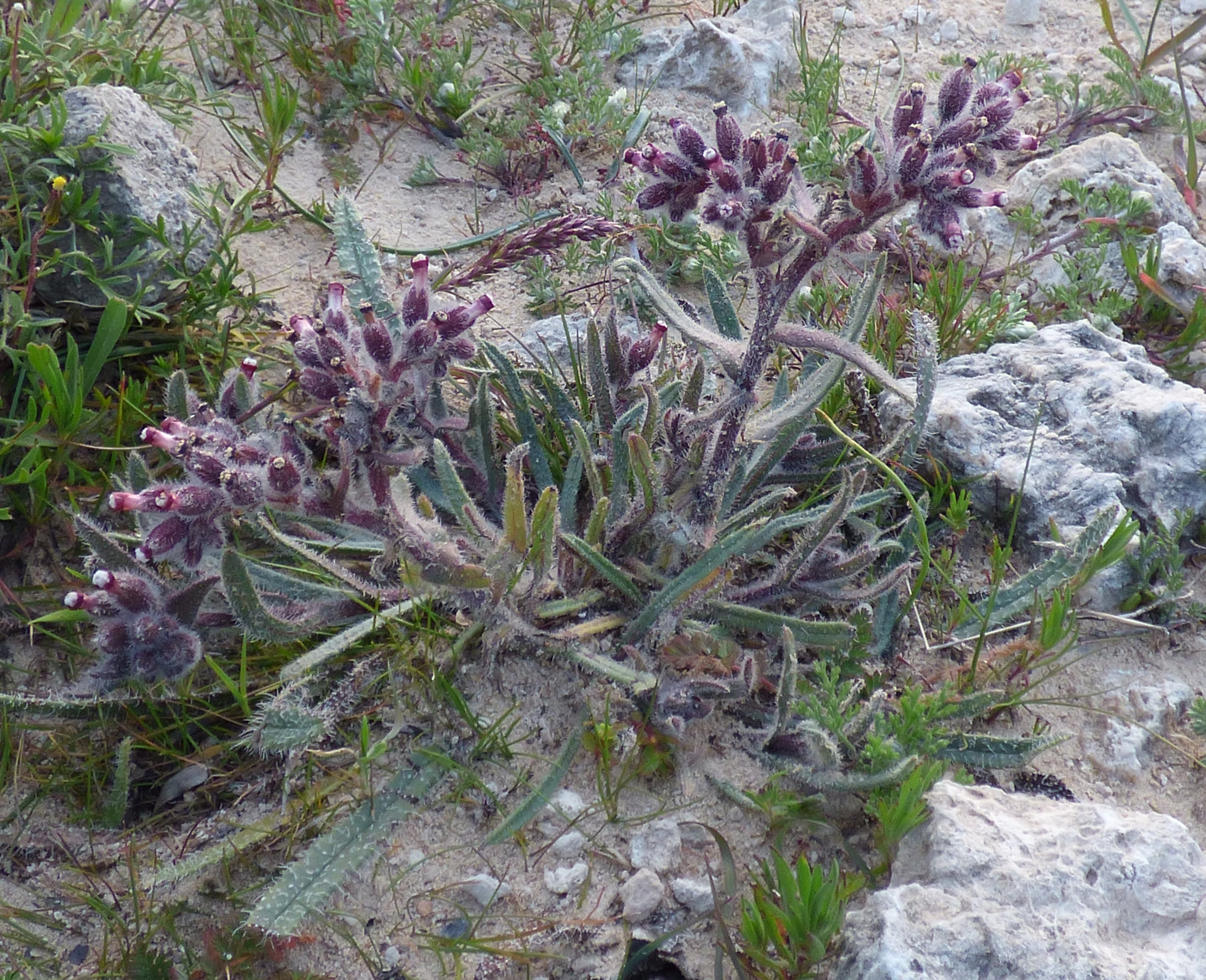
- Example from Varsak (Antalya, Turkey)

Scientific classification
- Kingdom: Plantae
- Clade: Tracheophytes
- Clade: Angiosperms
- Clade: Eudicots
- Clade: Asterids
- Order: Boraginales
- Family: Boraginaceae
- Genus: Hormuzakia
- Species: H. limbata

Binomial name
- Hormuzakia limbata (Boiss.) Guşul

Synonyms
- Anchusa limbata Boiss.

= Hormuzakia limbata =

Species of plant

Hormuzakia limbata is a species of flowering plant in the family Boraginaceae endemic to Antalya in Turkey with the Turkish name "Gövrek".

== Description ==
A distinctive biennial, 5 to 20 cm (2.0 to 7.9 in), hispid, with linear leaves, resembling an Anchusa with red tube-like flowers.

== Range ==
Endemic to Antalya in Turkey.

== Habitat ==
Calcareous hills, under Pinus brutia and Cedrus libani, to 1,300 m (4,300 ft).

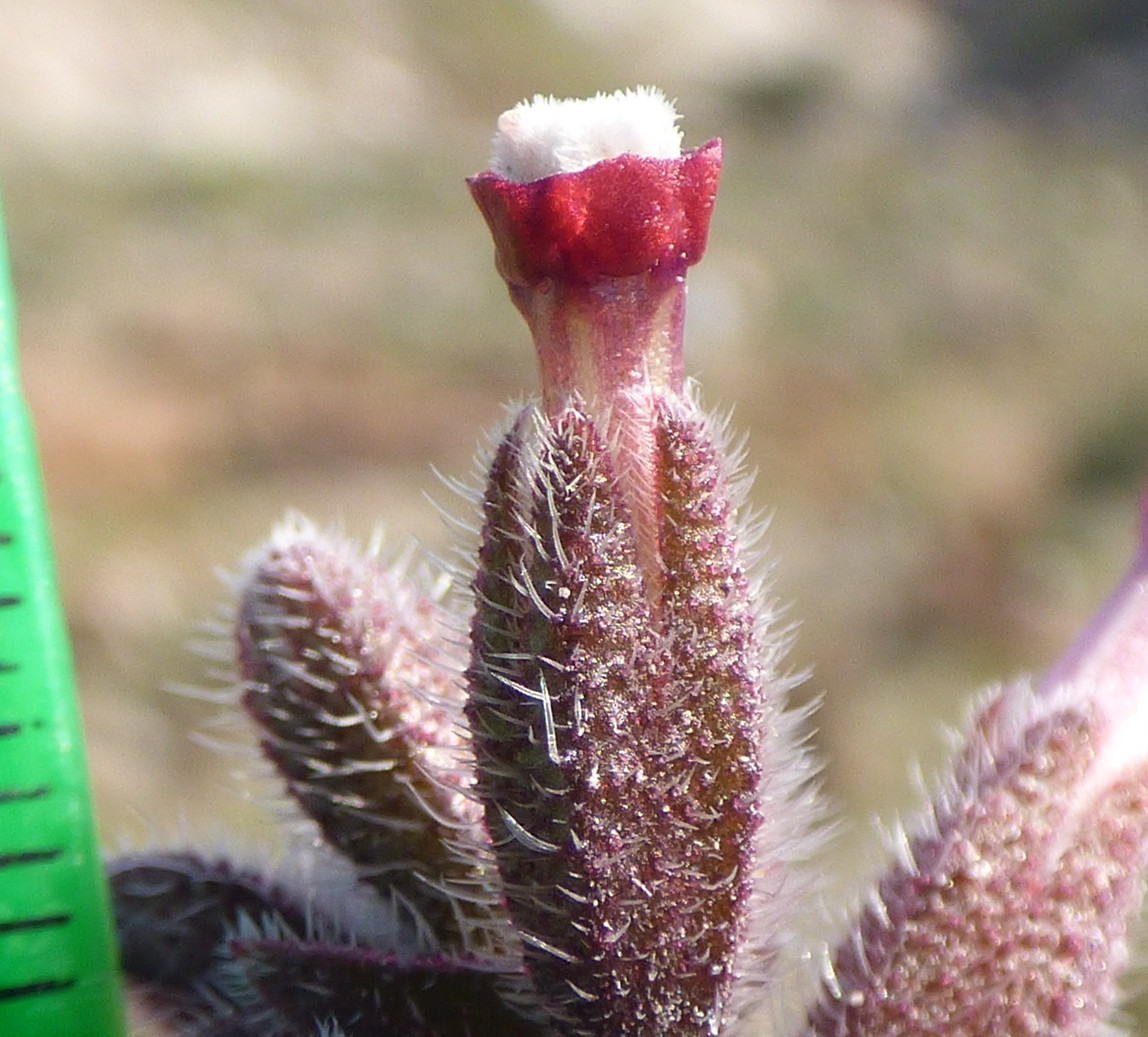
Flower

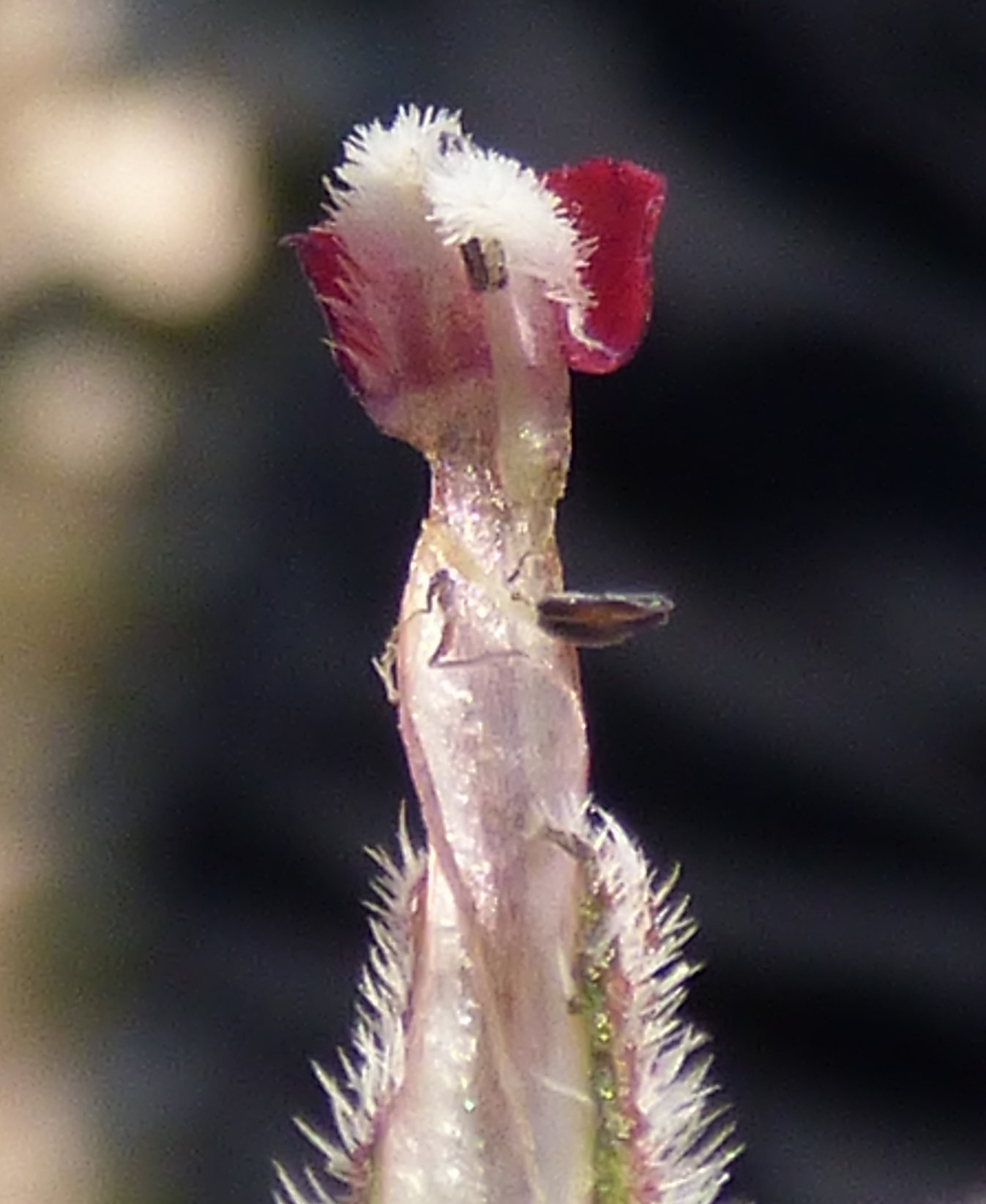
Corolla and scales

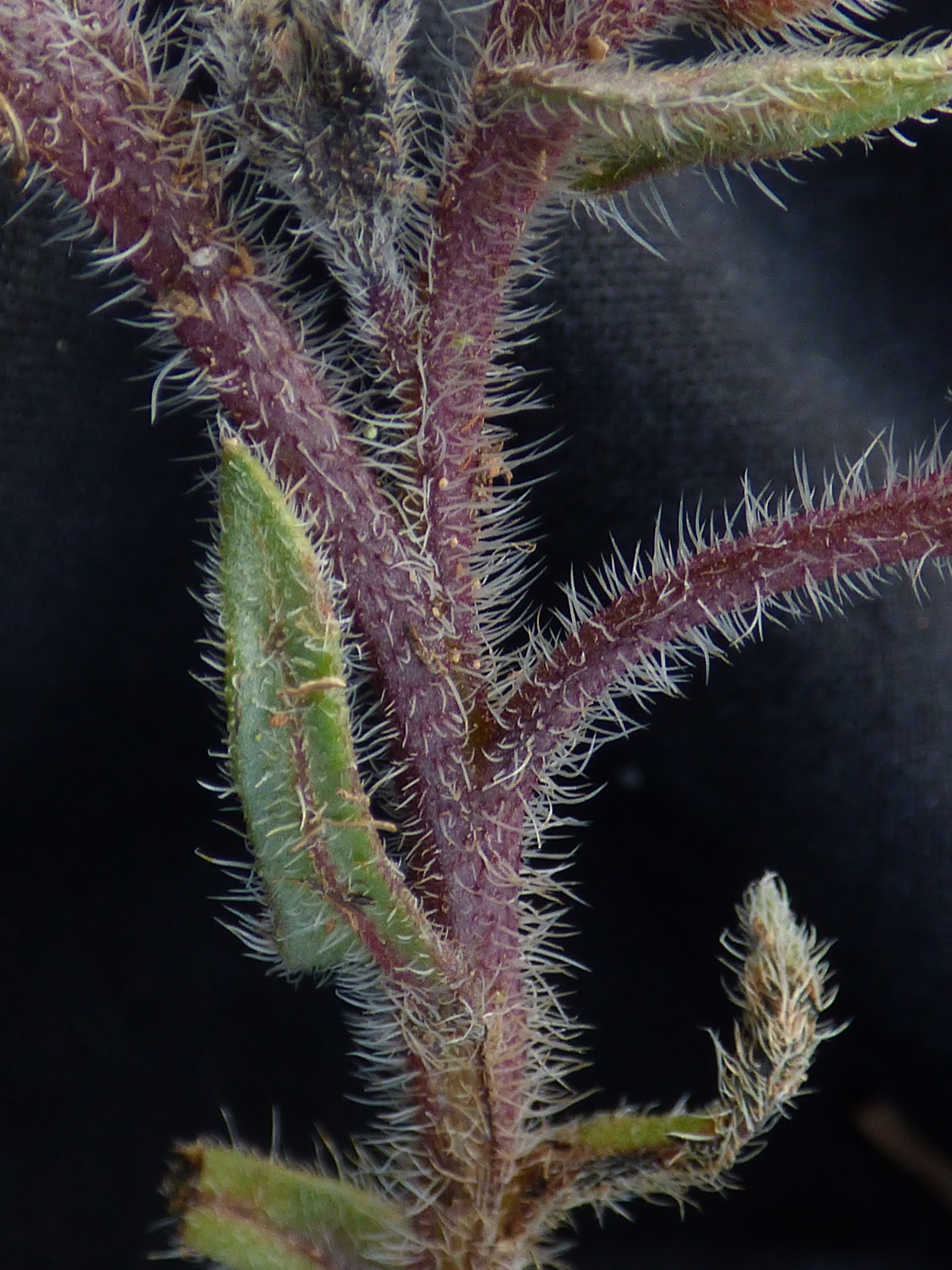
Hairs
