= Lukivtsi =

Village in Chernivtsi Oblast, Ukraine

Coordinates: 48°12′N 25°25′E

Lukivtsi (Ukrainian: Луківці; Romanian: Lucavăț) is a village and rural council in Vyzhnytsia Raion, Chernivtsi Oblast, Ukraine. It belongs to Berehomet settlement hromada, one of the hromadas of Ukraine.

The rural council is composed of five villages: Lipovany (Липовани; Lipoveni), Lukivtsi, Maidan (Майдан; Maidan-Lucavăț), Vakhnivtsi (Вахнівці, Vahnăuți) and Vovchynets (Вовчинець, Volcineț).

== Natives ==
- Mihail Gușuleac (1887–1960), Austro-Hungarian-born Romanian botanist
