= Mihail Gușuleac =

Romanian botanist

Mihail Gușuleac (October 12, 1887–September 11, 1960) was an Austro-Hungarian-born Romanian botanist.

Gușuleac was born in Lucavăț, a village located west of the Duchy of Bukovina’s capital Cernăuți, where he attended high school from 1899 to 1907. He then studied at Czernowitz University from 1907 to 1911, in the natural sciences department of the science faculty. He specialized in marine biology at the zoological station in Trieste, and in systematic morphology and phytogeography at the universities of Vienna, Prague and Halle. His 1926 doctorate from Prague dealt with the structure of the Bromeliaceae stomata. He taught at high schools in Câmpulung Moldovenesc (1917-1919), Prague and Suceava (1912-1915, 1918–1919). He taught botany at Cernăuți University (1921-1939) and was dean of the science faculty (1928-1930). He headed the botanical institute and garden in Cernăuți, and was scientific inspector for Bukovina and Bessarabia. In May 1937, he was elected a corresponding member of the Romanian Academy. In December 1935, he had been named a titular member of the rival Romanian Academy of Sciences. From 1939 to 1951, he was professor of botany at the University of Bucharest.

Gușuleac studied the fundamental principles of plant classification and the problems of phytogenesis. He created a new system and nomenclature for the morphogenetic classification of fruits. He introduced complex methods of research in morphology and anatomy, systematics and experimental genetics. In 1948, the new communist regime purged him from the academy. He later made original contributions to a massive volume on the country's flora. He described two new genera of the Boraginaceae, naming them after Romanian naturalists: Procopiania and Hormuzakia. His contributions appeared in Glasul Bucovinei, Buletinul Facultății de Științe din Cernăuți, Horticultorul român, Buletinul Grădinii Botanice și Muzeului botanic al Univ. din Cluj, Natura, Revue de Biologie de l’Acad. R.P.R. and Studii și cercetări de biologie vegetală. Upon his recommendation, Bukovina's Ponoare flower fields, Todirescu plain and Slătioara old-growth forest were all declared natural reservations. He wrote monographs about several scientists. In 1948, he published a course on the thallophytes. He was decorated with the Order of the Crown of Romania. He died in Bucharest.

The standard author abbreviation Gușul. is used to indicate this person as the author when citing a botanical name.
