= Lipoveni, Cimișlia =

Lipoveni
- Commune
- Location within Moldova
- Country: Moldova
- District: Cimişlia

Government
  - Mayor: Petrache Mihai (PLDM)

Area
  - Total: 2 km^{2} (0.77 sq mi)

Population (2014)
  - Total: 1,761
- Time zone: UTC+2 (EET)
  - Summer (DST): UTC+3 (EEST)
- Postal code: MD-4124

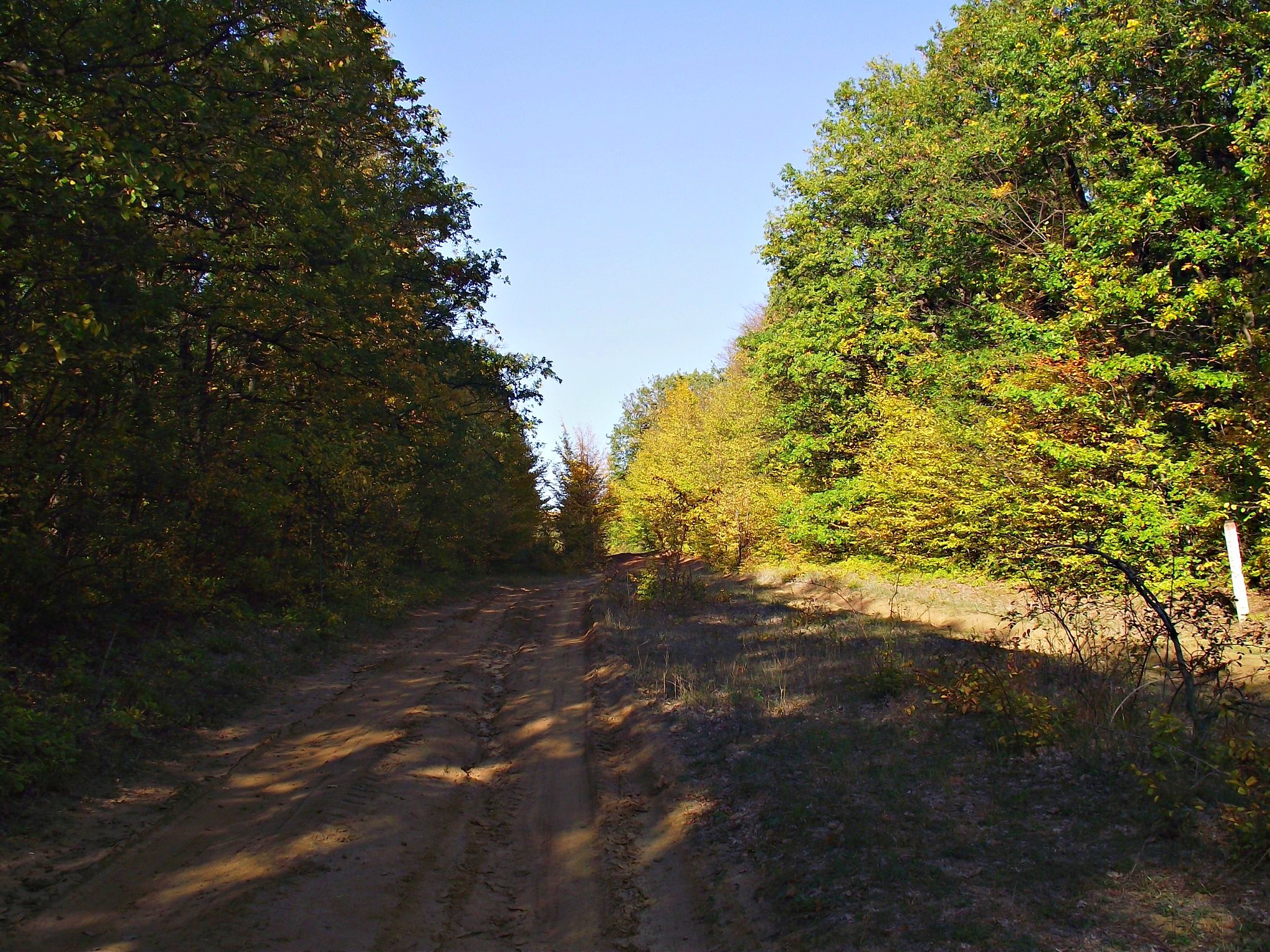
Lipoveni road

Lipoveni is a commune in Cimișlia District, Moldova. It is composed of a three villages: Lipoveni, Munteni and Schinoșica.
