= Dragoș Vodă National College (Câmpulung Moldovenesc) =

Romanian high school

Coordinates: 47°31′45″N 25°33′20″E

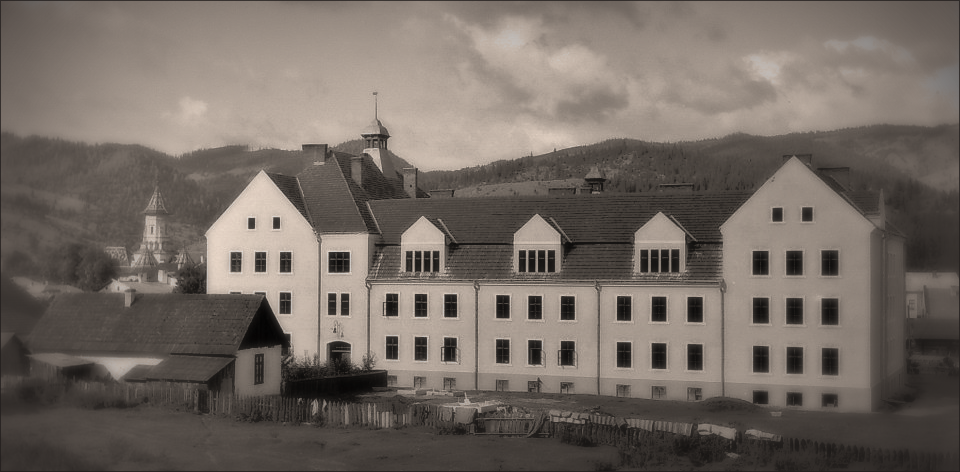
The school in 1915

Dragoș Vodă National College (Romanian: Colegiul Național „Dragoș Vodă”) is a high school located in Câmpulung Moldovenesc, Romania.

At the turn of the 20th century, when the area belonged to the Duchy of Bukovina in Austria-Hungary, the local inhabitants began to request a high school along the lines of the one in Suceava. The town council forwarded the petition to the Austrian government in 1903. The school opened as a gymnasium in 1907. The first director of the gymnasium was Daniil Verenca, who came from Chernivtsi. Among the first teachers of the gymnasium were Modest Cavaler de Sorocean, Dimitrie Logigan and Ion Ștefureac. Initially, it had one class in two sections. More grades were gradually added, so that the full eight grades (5-12) were in place for the 1914-1915 school year. Romanian, Latin, mathematics and Orthodox religion were taught in Romanian, other subjects in German. The faculty consisted of a director and ten teachers.

World War I disrupted school life: teachers were drafted into the Austro-Hungarian Army, while Imperial Russia occupied the area. Starting in 1919, after the union of Bukovina with Romania, all subjects were taught in Romanian from textbooks printed in the Romanian Old Kingdom. The institution became a high school and was named after Dragoș, Voivode of Moldavia. The name was dropped in 1948 by the nascent communist regime, which renamed it “Middle School”. It was once again named after Dragoș for its semicentennial in 1957. In 2000, it received the title of national college.
