= Ionel Fernic =

- Born: Ionel Fernic; May 29, 1901; Târgoviște, Kingdom of Romania
- Died: July 22, 1938 (aged 37) Stulpicani, Kingdom of Romania
- Genres: Easy listening
- Occupations: Composer, aviator, parachutist
- Years active: 1931–1938

Ionel Fernic (Romanian pronunciation: [joˈnel ˈfernik]; May 29, 1901 – July 22, 1938) was a Romanian composer, aviator (civil pilot), writer, and one of the first Romanian parachutists.

== Early life ==
He was born in Târgoviște. His family moved to Galați, where Ionel attended the Vasile Alecsandri High School, and where he met his mentor, the Romanian composer and music teacher Theodor Fuchs, who tutored him in the arts of piano and guitar music. Being a music enthusiast, and passionate about airplanes, Ionel Fernic was guided by his parents to attend a technical faculty but he eventually decided to go to the Academy of Music and Dramatic Art in Bucharest, where he was admitted at the drama section with the highest grade average.

Although he was remarked by his teachers, Ionel did not continue his acting career despite having the opportunity to play alongside many famous Romanian actors like Aristide Demetriade, Ion Manolescu, and Mișu Fotino. He graduated in 1924, and was enrolled in the Reserve Officer School in Ploiești and remained in the city for a few years, the period when he wrote almost all of his works.

Under the guidance of professor Fuchs, Fernic composed in 1919, his last high school year, the ballad Cruce albă de mesteacăn, his first well known work. After settling in Ploiești, having an urge to create successful music, he composed a number of sentimental songs and tangos. His first tango, composed in 1931, was called Minciuna (better known by the name Pe boltă când apare luna), and was an adaptation of a French song proposed by Nicolae Kirițescu.

== Successful composer ==
In just a few years, Fernic wrote over 400 sentimental and other kinds of songs. Many of his songs were hits. Starting in 1927, Fernic published a volume of sketch stories called Misterele din Mizil (written as a feuilleton). In 1928, he published a volume of poems called Prăștii and several children's books. He founded the satirical magazine Să nu te superi că te-njur, and moved to Bucharest in the early 1930s.

== Flying career ==
Fernic graduated from the Pilot School in Băneasa in the spring of 1935, and received a pilot's licence. He also made the first parachute jump in Romania on May 31, 1936, at an aviation meeting held at the Băneasa Airport in Bucharest. His last jump was at an ARPA meeting held in Izmail, Ukraine (then part of Romania) when he jumped from a height of 800 m (2,600 ft) and landed in an unmarked place where he broke his left leg, and had to use a cane for the rest of his life. He was appointed director of the Cernăuți Pilot School, and was decorated by King Carol II with the Virtutea Aeronautică medal.

== Death ==
Fernic lost his life in an aviation accident on July 22, 1938, at the age of 37. Hearing of the death of Queen Marie of Romania in 1938, he desperately wanted to attend her funeral. Therefore, he embarked on a LOT Polish Airlines flight on the Warsaw–Cernăuți–Bucharest–Thessaloniki route, but after half an hour the plane mysteriously broke into two pieces and crashed between Gura Humorului and Câmpulung Moldovenesc, in the Negrileasa Forest, near the Stulpicani commune in Suceava County.

== Musical plays ==
Title of play	Musical genre	Verse	Year	Known interpretations
Cruce albă de mesteacăn	romance	Artur Enășescu, Ion Sân-Giorgiu	1919	Dorel Livianu, Jean Moscopol
Țiganca	romance	Artur Enășescu	1928	Ioana Radu, Doina Badea
La umbra nucului bătrân	romance	Alexandru Dinescu	1930	Ioana Radu
Minciuna (Pe boltă când apare luna)	tango	Aurel Felea	1931	Dorel Livianu, Cristian Vasile, Gică Petrescu
Dar ești la fel (Quand même)	tango	Ionel Fernic (ro.); Nicolae Kirițescu (fr.)	1931	
O dată	tango	Nicolae Kirițescu	1931	
Îți mai aduci aminte, doamnă	romance	Cincinat Pavelescu	1932	Dorel Livianu, Jean Moscopol, Alexandru Giugaru
Iubesc femeia	tango-romance	Ionel Fernic	1933	Cristian Vasile
Mi-a murit norocul	waltz-boston	Nunuța Morțun Fernic	1933	
Inima e o chitară	foxtrot	Ionel Fernic	1933	
La geamul tău luminat	tango	Ionel Fernic	1934	
Pentru tine am făcut nebunii	tango	Ionel Fernic	1934	Cristian Vasile
E primăvară	Argentinian tango	Ionel Fernic	1935	
Dormi, păpușă, noapte bună	foxtrot slow	Ionel Fernic	1935	
Adio, doamnă	tango		unknown	Gheorghe Ionescu Gion, Jean Moscopol
Aprinde o țigară	tango		unknown	Titi Botez, Cristian Vasile, Constantin Florescu
Beau			unknown	Cristian Vasile
Cea din urmă seară	romance	Ionel Fernic	unknown	
Cel din urmă trandafir			unknown	
Dă-mi mâinile să le sărut	romance		unknown	Zavaidoc
De ce mi-ai spus că mă iubești	tango	Ionel Fernic	unknown	Cristian Vasile, Tudor Gheorghe
În ochii tăi fermecători	tango	Robert Storeck	unknown	Cristian Vasile
Iartă-mi	tango	Jurmann	unknown	
Mai spune-mi înc-odată	tango	Ionel Fernic	unknown	Jean Moscopol, Tudor Gheorghe
Mihalache, mamă, dragă	muzică populară	Ionel Fernic	unknown	Zavaidoc
Minte-mă	tango		unknown	Cristian Vasile
Nu cred	tango	Bachicha	unknown	Gion
Nunuțo	tango	Ionel Fernic	unknown	Cristian Vasile
Nu-mi mai spune iar minciuni de amor	tango		unknown	Titi Botez
Romanța celei care minte	romance	Ion Minulescu	unknown	Gică Petrescu, Traian Fortun
Să nu te superi că te-njur	romance		unknown	Zavaidoc
Scrisoare de amor			unknown	Mia Braia
Scrisoare de dor		Aurel Felea	unknown	Margareta Pâslaru
