= Iacob Iacobovici =

Romanian surgeon (1879–1959)

Iacob Melcon Iacobovici (November 18, 1879 – October 9, 1959) was a Romanian surgeon of Armenian descent.

== Biography ==
=== Origins and early career ===
Born in Costești, Botoșani County, his family were peasants of Armenian origin who had arrived in the Moldavia region over a century earlier. His parents Melcon and Roza were poor, which meant that their son struggled materially as he passed through A. T. Laurian High School in Botoșani and the University of Bucharest's medical faculty. He graduated from the latter institution in 1905 with a thesis on fetal arteriology that he defended before professors Paul Petrini, Thoma Ionescu, Dimitrie Gerota, Anastasie Obregia, and Dimitrie Drăghicescu. The work earned him a magna cum laude degree and a letter of commendation from Wilhelm von Waldeyer. While a student, he became an extern in 1901, an intern at Spitalul Brâncovenesc in 1902, and an assistant in the anatomy department the same year.

In 1907, Iacobovici won a competition to become assistant to Ionescu at Colțea Hospital. In 1912, he became consulting physician at the same institution, as well as librarian of the medical faculty. He remained in Bucharest until 1919, taking part as a combat medic in the Second Balkan War and World War I. He wrote numerous scientific publications and proposed several new surgical techniques. In October 1919, following the union of Transylvania with Romania and the establishment of a medical faculty within the new University of Cluj, he was named head of the surgical clinic at Cluj, with the rank of full professor.

=== At Cluj and return to Bucharest ===
The clinic Iacobovici set up included laboratories for biochemistry, urology, endoscopy, morphology and dissection, as well as ambulatory and emergency departments and sections for trauma, orthopedics, urology and chest surgery. In 1922, he edited a textbook on upper abdominal surgery. In 1926, together with several collaborators, he published a propaedeutics of surgery, the first of its kind in Romania. He served as university rector in 1922–1923, and during his term established Cluj University Press, the country's first university press. In May 1923, as he was walking from his bedroom to his dining room one evening, an assailant fired four shots at him from the street, but missed. The police were convinced the deed was the work of a disgruntled anti-Semitic student.

When Iacobovici arrived in Transylvania, there were almost no Romanian surgeons in the province, methods of surgery were obsolete and Romanian-language teaching materials were scarce. Starting under these conditions, he managed to train surgeons who developed departments throughout Transylvania and even in the former Old Kingdom. In 1929, when he had Alexandru Pop appointed lecturer and, implicitly, his successor as clinic head, nearly all the senior physicians quit and went to other cities. In ten years, Iacobovici trained some forty surgeons, who later became department heads and, in some cases, university professors. Among the types of operations in which he innovated were surgery for gastric ulcer, biliary bypass, tuberculosis, lumbar region, neurovegetative features and war wounds; as well as working on thyroid pathology, pulmonary exeresis and renal tumors.

Following the accidental death in 1933 of Ernest Juvara, head of the surgery clinic at Spitalul Brâncovenesc, Iacobovici was named as his replacement. At Bucharest, he continued working for a further fifteen years. He created yet another school of surgeons, founded the country's first emergency hospital in 1934, and in 1935 was a founding member of the Romanian Medical Academy. Taken together, around twenty professors emerged from under his tutelage at Cluj and Bucharest. During the National Legionary State, he was temporarily removed from his post of clinic director. After World War II, he showed increasing signs of Parkinson's disease and cardiac sclerosis. He asked to retire in 1947, and left the clinic for good in 1949. He died in 1959 and, in accordance with his last will, was immediately incinerated at Cenușa Crematorium in a simple ceremony. He donated three buildings in Bucharest and his villa at Târgu Ocna to what was now the Carol Davila University of Medicine and Pharmacy.
