= Victor Gomoiu =

Romanian surgeon, anatomist, folklorist (1882 - 1960)

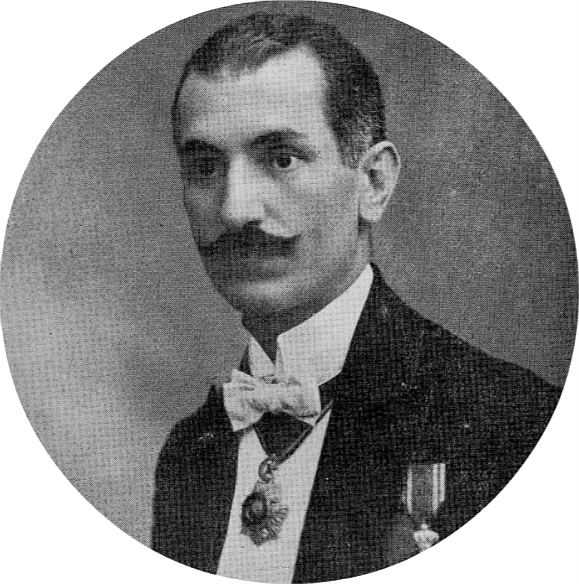
- Gomoiu, ca. 1920
- Born: April 18, 1882; Vânju Mare, Mehedinți County, Kingdom of Romania
- Died: February 6, 1960 (aged 77); Bucharest, People's Republic of Romania
- Resting place: Bellu Cemetery, Bucharest
- Scientific career
- Fields: Anatomy; Pathology; Thalassotherapy; Light therapy; Physical anthropology; Social medicine; History of medicine; Folkloristics; Ethnomedicine
- Workplaces: Colțea Hospital; Filantropia Hospital; Brâncovenesc Hospital; University of Bucharest; Romanian Ministry of Health; International Society for the History of Medicine; League of Nations

Minister of Health
- In office 4 July 1940 – 14 September 1940
- Prime Minister: Ion Gigurtu; Ion Antonescu
- Preceded by: Nicolae Hortolomei
- Succeeded by: Vasile Iașinschi

Personal details
- Party: National Renaissance Front

Victor Gomoiu (April 18, 1882 – February 6, 1960) was a Romanian surgeon, anatomist, folklorist and medical historian, who served as Minister of Health and Social Protection in 1940. Noted before 1910 for his work in descriptive surgery and pathology, focusing on the treatment of tuberculosis, genital diseases and tumors, he soon became one of the main contributors to medical historiography and bibliography. He founded several hospitals and edited medical journals, setting up a collection of medical instruments which became the basis of a national museum in Craiova. He became a professor at the University of Bucharest, an expert for the League of Nations, and, after distinguished service in World War I, a recipient of the Legion of Honor; additionally, he served for 22 years as president of the International Society for the History of Medicine, of which his wife Viorica was also an active member.

A protégé of Queen Helen and administrator of her Brâncovenesc Hospital, Gomoiu fell out with King Carol II, and was arrested in 1934 for protesting against his rule. He returned to serve in two consecutive far-right governments, but, during World War II, emerged as a protector of the Romanian Jews, denouncing the policy of deportations to Transnistria. Despite this stance and his international profile, Gomoiu was arrested by the postwar communist regime, and spent time in confinement at Sighet and Aiud prisons. He had been posthumously rehabilitated by the 1980s, but his work was only fully recovered after the Romanian Revolution of 1989.

== Biography ==
=== Early life and work ===
Born in Vânju Mare, Mehedinți County, he was the first child of Romanian Orthodox priest Gheorghe and his wife Ana. He attended primary school in his native village, followed by Traian High School in Turnu Severin from 1893 to 1900. Between 1900 and 1905, he studied at the medical faculty of the University of Bucharest. Meanwhile, he rose steadily through the hospital ranks, from extern at Colțea Hospital in 1903 to intern there in 1905 to apprentice doctor at Bucharest's central military hospital in 1910. Gomoiu was a disciple of anatomist Thoma Ionescu. Alongside Dimitrie Gerota, Ernest Juvara, and Victor Papilian, he continued Ionescu's work in descriptive anatomy as well as, in some instances, physical anthropology.

In 1906, Gomoiu published in Bucharest the first volume of his Istoricul Societăței Studenților în Medicină ("History of the Medical Students' Society"), with a plate by Ary Murnu; also that year, his study on eye disease among the rural population saw print at Târgu Jiu. Affiliated with the left-wing agrarian current, or Poporanism, he established in that city the literary magazine Șezătórea Săteanului ("Villager's Sitting"), joining an editorial office which also included George Coșbuc and G. Dumitrescu Bumbești-Jiu. It was here that he published some of his first contributions in ethnomedicine. He took his first trip outside the country in 1908, visiting states from Austria-Hungary to Great Britain.

Gomoiu published steadily, and also lectured at the Medical Students' Society and the Surgical Society. Topics included meningoencephalitis, cerebral atrophy, facial nerve paralysis, fibrous tissue neoplasm, lipoma, the anatomy of the endothelium, corneal transplantation, skin grafting, dental implants, hysterectomy, various types of cysts and "rare tumors", and talus bone expulsion. These works were taken up in Eraclie Sterian's magazine, Spitalul, of which Gomoiu was co-editor, or published as brochures. His doctoral thesis, on facial anaplasia, was awarded a magna cum laude in 1909, and published the same year. It was followed in 1910 by Gomoiu's introduction to inguinal hernia surgery, his reviews of surgery as applied to genital tuberculosis, vaginal hydrocele, urethrocele, and varicocele, and a work on the physiological role of cholesterol. A winner of the Manoah Hillel scholarship, that year and the next also saw his first contributions as a medical bibliographer and librarian, with catalogues of entries for the University of Bucharest's graduation papers in medicine. For his service in the Romanian Army, Gomoiu was concentrated in Medgidia.

Gomoiu soon lost his father to pancreatic cancer and found it hard to provide for himself, accepting jobs for which he was overqualified. In March 1911, recommended by Francisc Rainer, he began working as a surgical docent and became director of the Techirghiol tuberculosis sanatorium. He modernized the institution, systematizing records, constructing a laboratory, planting a grove of cluster pines, and furnishing a small facility for the study of regional climatology and radioactivity. He also began experimenting with thalassotherapy, light therapy, and the use of medicinal clay. This inaugurated a ten-year practice at various hospitals, during which Gomoiu patented various new surgical techniques. In November, after a disagreement with medical inspector Gheorghe Proca, who suggested that the sanatorium was unhygienic, Gomoiu handed in his resignation.

In 1913, a second-class surgeon at Filantropia Hospital, Gomoiu published a piece on "the radical treatment of vaginal hydrocele" in the French journal Lyon Chirurgical, and his opening lesson on "small surgery" (Mica chirurgie). That year, he also performed his military obligation by accompanying the ambulatory health service sent to the Ottoman Empire during the Second Balkan War and performing surgery within the unit. In parallel, he studied craniometry, publishing a study of 24 craniums in Revista Științelor Medicale, then as a booklet, and following up in 1915 with Cercetări asupra perimetrului cranian ("Researching the Cranial Perimeter"). The same years saw his many conferences at the Surgical Society printed in several editions, alongside separate studies of skin cancer, the sympathetic nervous system in the abdomen, gas gangrene of the thorax, and gastrostomy techniques. In 1916, he and Ionescu together discovered the link between stellate ganglion removal and sympathectomy.

=== Rise to prominence ===
For his work as a military physician during the Romanian Campaign of World War I, Gomoiu was decorated with the Order of the Crown (1917), the Order of the Star of Romania (1918), and the Queen Marie Cross (1919). He subsequently served terms as head of the Union of Reserve Officers, and, in 1920–1921, was curator (or efor) of Bucharest's civilian hospitals. The author of Hommage a la France et aux médecins français ("A Homage to France and French Physicians", 1918), Gomoiu was made a chevalier of the Legion of Honor in 1922. Between 1919 and 1942, he was a surgeon at the Oradea war hospital and at two hospitals in Bucharest, also working at Brâncovenesc Hospital. Meanwhile, he held various leadership roles in medical societies and administrative bodies, and, in 1921, became a professor at Bucharest University.

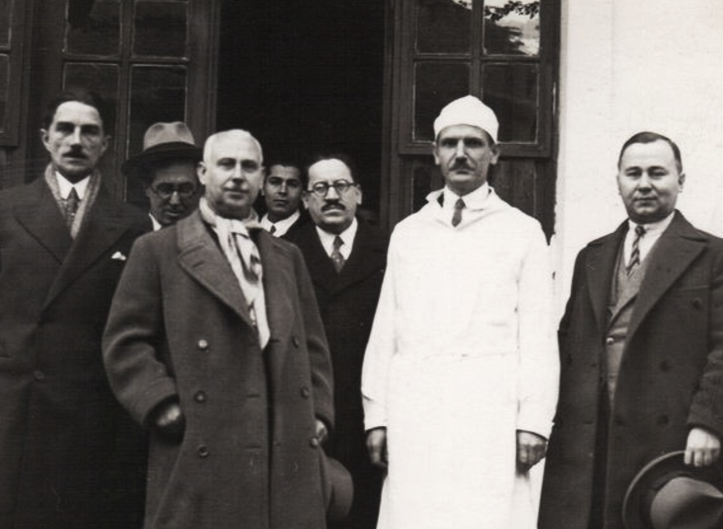
Secretary General Gomoiu (in surgeon's uniform) with staff of the Ministry of Health mechanical workshops, 1930

His work now included tracts in social medicine, the history of medicine and medical education. In 1923, he published the volume Din istoria medicinei și învățământului medical în România ("Briefs on the History of Medicine and Medical History in Romania"), followed in 1927 by Preoțimea în slujba operelor de ocrotire și medicină socială ("Priesthood in Service of Medical Care and Social Medicine"). The former essay, reissued in 1940 as Biserica și medicina ("Church and Medical Science"), showed Gomoiu as a deist, philosophically inspired by Isaac Newton and Giovanni Battista Morgagni. The work, which suggested that priests could work as "doctors of the soul", earned him a special prize from the Ministry of Health, led at the time by the priest Ioan Lupaș.

Gomoiu also issued Istoricul presei medicale din România ("A History of Romania's Medical Press", 1925), and the second volume of Istoricul Societăței Studenților (1926). His first contacts with the International Society for the History of Medicine (ISHM) came in 1927 and 1928, when he sent in presentations on the first physicians active in the Danubian Principalities and the roots of Romanian ethnomedicine. In late 1927, on a visit to northern Europe, Gomoiu was impressed by Danish education. His article covering Danish libraries, and in particular the one Nikolaj Tower, saw print in Cuvântul daily and was also taken up in Școala Noastră.

Gomoiu also became a trusted supporter of King Ferdinand I, managing the charity set up by his daughter, Princess Ileana. He was one of the specialists who assisted Ferdinand during his losing battle with colorectal cancer. In 1927, under Ileana's patronage, he set up the Sfânta Elena Hospital, in the working-class suburb of Bariera Vergului, Bucharest. He personally oversaw the pledge drive, collecting private donations and public money from the National Bank, the Ministry of Health and Căile Ferate Române, offering free medical services to the donors. Gomoiu also designed much of the building, modifying sketches by the architect Gheorghe Șimotta. In the end, the hospital developed into a regional model, being cited as such in League of Nations reports.

Together with his friend Mihai Cănciulescu, Gomoiu edited Acta Medica Romana magazine from 1928 to 1948. There, the two led a sustained campaign for the establishment of a university at Craiova, and also contributed to the establishment of regional hospitals in Vânju Mare, Turnu Severin, and Mangalia. Considered a founder of medical history and museography in Romania, Gomoiu collected old publications, diplomas, decrees, instruments and medical or pharmaceutical apparatus. He founded the ISHN-affiliated Romanian Medical History Society, which held monthly meetings from 1929 to 1948 and was also placed under Princess Ileana's patronage. With his wife Viorica, herself a physician, Gomoiu organized and hosted the ISHM's September 1932 congress in Bucharest.

For a while in 1930, Gomoiu served as secretary general in the Ministry of Health. In this capacity, he attended a conference on social hygiene in the French industrial hub of Tergnier, meeting with the organizer, Raoul Dautry. He also represented Romania on the League of Nations committee for physical education, inspecting the military school at Joinville-le-Pont. After losing his government office, he returned to the ISHM and, in 1933, was elected its vice president.

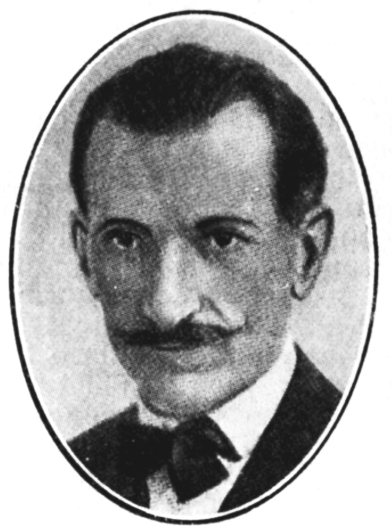
Gomoiu, photographed ca. 1932

Gomoiu also served as private physician to Queen Helen, estranged wife of the new king, Carol II. Around 1933, she also appointed him to lead her charity, Așezămintele Brâncovenești. During this period of his wife, Gomoiu emerged as "one of the best known critics of [Carol's] camarilla". In March–April 1934, Gomoiu created a stir by publishing a manifesto against Carol and his circle of politicians. He was briefly arrested on charges of lèse-majesté, alongside far-right politicians suspected of having conspired with the Iron Guard, which had just assassinated Prime Minister Ion G. Duca.

Gomoiu was also investigated for an alleged plot to assassinate Carol, but he rejected the charges, and insisted that he only wanted Queen Helen to be allowed back in the country. His account was backed by the Union of Reserve Officers, which staged a public protest; its influence, insiders speculated, explained by Gomoiu was treated leniently in court. In May 1936, Gomoiu was called upon by the Iron Guard to be a defense witness for Viorel Trifa, Alecu Cantacuzino, and other Guardista accused of conspiracy against the state.

=== Ministerial office and communist persecution ===
Gomoiu was president of the ISHM from 1936 to 1940, having successfully defeated with Maxime Laignel Lavastine, who became his bitter adversary. He had by then established inside the international body a Cantacuzène Commission, named after (and presided upon by) Ion Cantacuzino. It tasked with researching and inventorying European medical folklore—although this subject was of marginal interest to Cantacuzino himself. Gomoiu also returned to his anatomical research, publishing in 1938 a definitive monograph of the connective tissue (Țesutul conjunctiv), co-authored by his student V. Plătăreanu. Also that year, the two also presented a report on "the cross in Romanian medical folklore" to the ISHM Congress in Zagreb; with Al. Raicovicianu, Gomoiu also published the bibliographic corpus Histoire du folklore médical en Roumanie ("A History of Medical Folklore in Romania").

By that moment in history, Carol had established his National Renaissance Front dictatorship, and, in 1940, appointed Ion Gigurtu to lead a government that included some Iron Guard members. Gomoiu also joined, serving as Gigurtu's Health Minister from July 4 to September 4. In this capacity, and also as a member of the Crown Council, he was marginally involved in the major international crisis which saw the cession of Romanian land to the Soviet Union and the Axis powers. On the night of August 29–30, he was among a majority of ministers who voted to peacefully cede the regions of Northern Transylvania to Regency Hungary. Gomoiu kept his ministerial office during the first government of Ion Antonescu, from September 4 to 14, until the establishment of the National Legionary State and Carol's flight from the country. Reportedly, he resented Antonescu's alliance with the Iron Guard, and avoided politics altogether.

In October 1942, at the height of Antonescu's alliance with Nazi Germany, Gomoiu's friend Barbu Lăzăreanu was arrested with other Jews and scheduled to be deported to Transnistria Governorate, but was spared thanks to Gomoiu's appeal to Queen Helen, who intervened on Lăzăreanu's behalf. As a Swiss journalist reported at the time, Gomoiu, "a man so nice that he could not imagine that the Jews are so persecuted", personally visited the Jewish detainees and convinced himself of their mistreatment, before contacting the queen. The latter insisted that she would leave the country, and endanger Antonescu's legitimacy, if the deportations would continue.

Upon the end of World War II and a 6-year hiatus, Gomoiu was finally replaced as head of the ISHM by Laignel Lavastine. Shortly after the establishment of a communist regime in December 1947, Gomoiu was removed from teaching. He was arrested, together with tens of others former dignitaries, on the night of May 5, 1950, and detained with them in the basement of the Ministry of the Interior, Palace Square. Incarcerated at Sighet prison from 1950 to 1953, where he was held in solitary confinement, he was transported to Bucharest in order to participate in a 1954 international congress on medical history. Released in 1954, he refused a position in the communized Health Ministry offered to him in 1956, viewing it is a form of collaborationism. Although some sources claim that he lived the rest of his days in Aiud prison, he is known to have died in Bucharest in 1960, "almost forgotten by everyone." He was buried in Plot 33 of Bellu Cemetery.

== Main writings ==
- Ibn Sina (Avicenna), Tip. Presa, Braila 1937, pp. 37 [Romanian] + 51 [French]

== Legacy ==
In 1963, Gomoiu's holdings and the minutes of his Medical History Society were donated to the University of Craiova by his widow Viorica, and form the basis for a museum of medical and pharmaceutical history. This was inaugurated within the medical faculty in 1974 and set up in its own building between 1979 and 1982. In recognition of Gomoiu's local contribution, an amphitheater was named after him. The Romanian Post also issued, in 1981, a series of stamps honoring the Medical History Society, with a postmark bearing Gomoiu's portrait. In 1990, following the Romanian Revolution, the institution in Bariera Vergului, now a children's hospital, was renamed in honor of its late founder. Two years later, the high school in Vânju Mare became "Victor Gomoiu Theoretical High School". His memoirs, recovered from the secret archives of the Securitate, were only published in 2006. A street in Craiova is named after him.
