= Nicolae Hortolomei =

Romanian doctor and academic

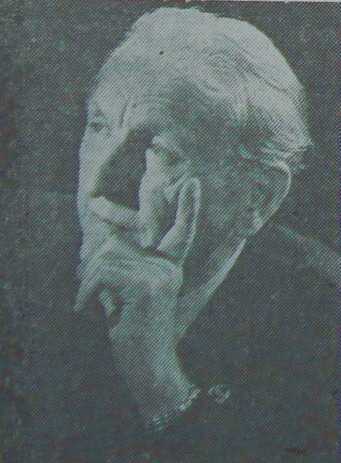
- Born: November 27, 1885; Huși, Kingdom of Romania
- Died: January 3, 1961 (aged 75); Bucharest, Romanian People's Republic
- Resting place: Bellu Cemetery, Bucharest
- Education: University of Iași
- Scientific career
- Fields: Surgery, Urology
- Workplaces: Grigore T. Popa University of Medicine and Pharmacy; Carol Davila University of Medicine and Pharmacy; Saint Spyridon Hospital; Colentina Hospital; Colțea Hospital
- Thesis: Congenital absence of the tibia (1909)
- Doctoral advisor: Ernest Juvara
- Doctoral students: Theodor Burghele

Minister of Health
- In office 24 November 1939 – 3 July 1940
- Prime Minister: Gheorghe Tătărescu
- Preceded by: Nicolae Marinescu
- Succeeded by: Victor Gomoiu

Personal details
- Party: National Renaissance Front

Nicolae Hortolomei (November 27, 1885 – January 3, 1961) was a Romanian surgeon, director of the Surgery and Urology Clinic at Colțea Hospital in Bucharest, professor at the Faculty of Medicine, titular member of the Romanian Academy, and Minister of Health.

== Education and career ==
He was born on November 27, 1885, in Huși, Fălciu County. From 1895 to 1902, he attended the Costache Negruzzi National College in Iași, and then studied at the Faculty of Medicine of the University of Iași. In 1909, he obtained his doctorate in medicine and surgery with thesis Congenital absence of the tibia written under the guidance of Ernest Juvara. After a brief stint as country doctor in Oancea, Galați County, he joined in 1911 the genitourinary diseases service at Saint Spyridon Hospital in Iași, and then was appointed assistant in the surgical clinic directed by Juvara and, later, by Amza Jianu. A few years later Hortolomei went back to Paris for specialization in urology in the clinic of Félix Legueu. During the Romanian campaign of World War I he organized field hospitals in Moldavia, together with Iacob Iacobovici. After the Union of Bessarabia with Romania, he was appointed head of the surgery department at the Gubernial Hospital in Chișinău. In 1920, he became professor of surgery at the Faculty of Medicine of the University of Iași. Among his students there were Vladimir Buțureanu, Gheorghe Chipail, Oscar Franche, and Gheorghe Plăcinteanu.

In 1930, Hortolomei transferred to the Colentina Hospital in Bucharest, while in 1933 he became director of the surgery and urology clinic at Colțea Hospital and professor at the Carol Davila University of Medicine and Pharmacy. His students included Theodor Burghele, Ioan Juvara, Gheorghe Olănescu, and Dan Setlacec.

From 1939 to 1940, Hortolomei served as Minister of Health in the Gheorghe Tătărescu government. He was elected titular member of the Romanian Academy in 1948. He was also a member of the French Académie nationale de chirurgie. In 1956 he was awarded the Order of the Star of the Romanian People's Republic.

He died in Bucharest on January 3, 1961. The coffin was deposited in the hall of the Institute of Medicine and Pharmacy, and the burial took place on January 5, at Bellu Cemetery, with military honors. In Contemporanul, the poet Tudor Arghezi dedicated a tablet to him, in which he wrote: "Hortolomei closed his eyes in the minute when time passes by, at midnight, in the beginning of the year. I would have been told that he was raising his glass to the health of man and mankind."

== Publications ==
- Hortolomei, Nicolae; Buțureanu, Vladimir (1921). Chirurgie de l'ulcère gastrique et duodenal (in French). Paris: Masson et Cie. OCLC 14745922. "Book Review: Chirurgie de l'ulcère gastrique et duodenal". The American Journal of Surgery. 13 (2): 331. 1931-08-01. doi:10.1016/S0002-9610(31)90271-7.
- Hortolomei, Nicolae; Juvara, Ioan; Litarczek, George (1954). Tratamentul Chirurgical Al Hipertireozelor (in Romanian). Editura Academiei Republicii Populare Române. OCLC 250371124.
