= Barbu Lăzăreanu =

Romanian literary historian, bibliographer, and left-wing activist (1881–1957)

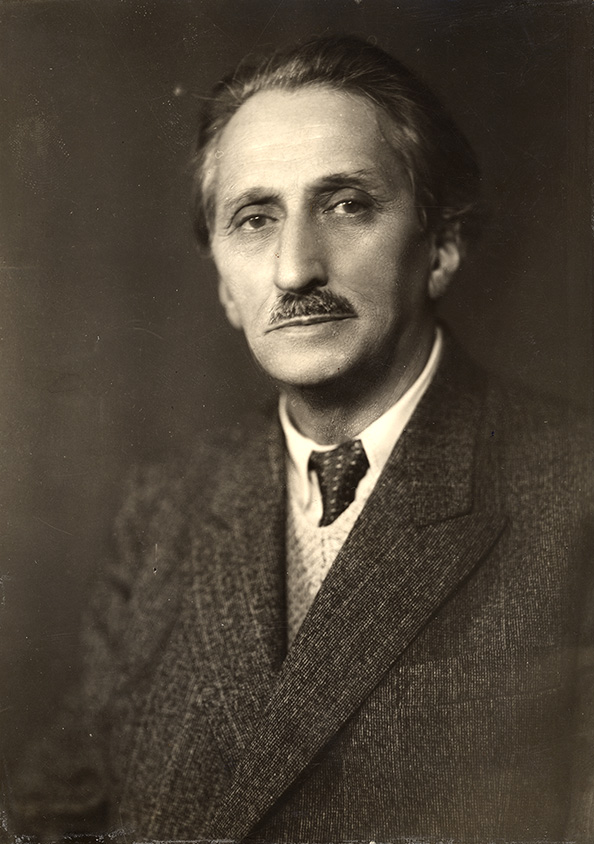
- Portrait of Barbu Lăzăreanu
- Born: Avram "Bubi" Lazarovici, also rendered Bercu Leizerovici; October 5, 1881; Botoșani, Kingdom of Romania
- Died: January 19, 1957 (aged 75); Bucharest, People's Republic of Romania
- Other names: Alex. Bucur, Arald, Barbou Lazareano, Barbu Lăzărescu, Bélé, Mathieu H. Rareșiu, Trubadur, Trubadurul

Academic work
- School or tradition: Marxist historiography Marxist literary criticism
- Main interests: Romanian literature, Romanian folklore, historical linguistics, phonoaesthetics, labor history, history of medicine
- Influenced: Constantin Popovici

Barbu Lăzăreanu (born Avram Lazarovici, or Bercu Leizerovici, also known as Barbou Lazareano or Barbu Lăzărescu; October 5, 1881 – January 19, 1957) was a Romanian literary historian, bibliographer, and left-wing activist. Of Romanian Jewish background, he became noted for both his social criticism and his lyrical pieces while still in high school, subsequently developing as a satirist and printing his own humorous magazine, Țivil-Cazon. Lăzăreanu's youthful sympathies veered toward the anarchist underground, prompting him to associate with Panait Mușoiu. At that stage of his life, he participated in a bakers' strike, and encouraged peasants to resist encroachment by the landowners.

Lăzăreanu's socialist-and-anarchist advocacy also made him a target of the conservative establishment, which expelled him from the country in 1907. He spent five years studying at the École des Hautes Études in Paris, all the while remaining attached to socialist organizations. He returned to Romania as a publicist, columnist, and workers' educator, being welcomed into a mainstream ethnic organization, the Union of Romanian Jews. During World War I, Lăzăreanu drifted leftward alongside the Social Democratic Party, joining the Socialist Party. He also earned the reputation of a highly focused literary researcher and biographer, noted as the editor of works by Ion Luca Caragiale and Constantin Dobrogeanu-Gherea. His series of monographs on Romanian literature was well received and sampled by other literary professionals, who were also impressed by his ability to carry on with his work despite a debilitating battle with tuberculosis; however, his attention for very minute detail, and his political bias, were both ridiculed.

By 1933, Lăzăreanu was a public critic of fascism, a fact which contributed to his persecution by the antisemitic far-right in the 1940s. He still managed to write and publish under the National Renaissance Front, but was afterwards marginalized, his propaganda confined to a word-of-mouth version during the regime established by Ion Antonescu. Having narrowly escaped a deportation to Transnistria and a likely death in 1942, he returned to public life after the 1944 Coup and subsequent democratization. He rose to prominence post-1948, under the Romanian communist regime, first as a rector of Ștefan Gheorghiu Academy, then as a member of the Romanian Academy and its Presidium.

Lăzăreanu spent his final decade as a decorated and lionized writer and political forerunner of the regime. As a librarian, he collected, preserved, and censored works left by Panait Istrati. He was also marginally involved in the orthographic reform. Lăzăreanu's final assignments included a steering position on the Jewish Democratic Committee, which functioned as a platform for anti-Zionism. His political activity was complemented by his son Alexandru, who debuted as a cultural journalist, affiliated with the communists, and held high-ranking positions in the Ministry of Foreign Affairs.

== Biography ==
=== Early life ===
Avram–Barbu, the son of Herschel Lazarovici, was listed in 1946 as a practitioner of the "Mosaic faith". The family had a questionable juridical status in the Kingdom of Romania, which denied citizenship to most Jews. During juridical disputes over this issue, Lăzăreanu argued that both his parents had held Romanian passports, but his documentary evidence was deemed "inconclusive" by competent authorities. The future author, primarily known in his early years as "Bubi" Lazarovici, was born in Botoșani, in a house on Târgul Calicilor Street. As later noted by academician Traian Săvulescu, this was in the southern, destitute part of the town, where Avram grew up "revolted by injustice and with a burning desire to rectify it." Lăzăreanu himself recalled that his image of hajduks and other outlaws as revolutionary heroes and his very interest in history were shaped when, as a child, he began reading popular novels by N. D. Popescu-Popnedea. He later learned to credit professional historians, beginning with Theodor Mommsen, and to appreciate authentic Romanian folklore as rendered by Ion Creangă; however, he still mused that his lifelong "romantic vision" may have been borrowed from Popnedea.

Avram attended primary school and A. T. Laurian High School in his native town, where he was benchmates with another literary man, the translator and critic Constantin Iordăchescu. A disciple of his, the journalist Ion Felea, reports that he paid for his own tuition by helping other students with their homework. It was at this stage that Lazarovici became acquainted with Marxism through his perusing of Contemporanul review and, as noted by his official obituary of 1957, made his reputation as a "propagandist of such ideas." His first contribution to the Romanian labor movement was taking part in a bakers' strike at Botoșani. In March 1899, the Laurian High School expelled Lazarovici for his socialist agitation. Similarly, Felea writes that Avram, "along with some of his colleagues", had felt a calling for the Gorbănești inhabitants, who were "heavily exploited by the landowners". It was only after the backlash that the young author became an enemy of the "bourgeois-landowning regime". Săvulescu, who places the events later in Lăzăreanu's life, has it that Lăzăreanu "had merely helped the peasants" of Gorbănești petition King Carol I, and that this was read as "anarchist propaganda against throne and religion." Novelist and researcher Horia Oprescu cites a piece published by Lăzăreanu in a 1899 issue of Socialismul, in which the young man noted: "This is one of the saddest years ever experienced by our Romanian country and by our movement. It comes with the persecution of peasant [socialist] clubs!" In detailing this claim, Lăzăreanu alleged that organized peasants were being "horribly tortured" and had their huts destroyed, in retaliation.

Lazarovici was first reviewed as poet in July 1900, when a Zionist paper, Egalitatea, spoke of the "rather exulted" verse he had published in the single-issue Adio of Botoșani. Many biographers date his poetic debut to another single-issue publication that he also edited—the 1902 Victor Hugo, where he also printed a manifesto in verse against aestheticism. Its naming after the French poet is a "moving but solitary act of [Hugolian] veneration" in the Romanian landscape. As noted by Oprescu, Lăzăreanu had found affinity with Hugo's "democratic ideas". Lăzăreanu's first work in satirical prose was hosted by George Ranetti's paper, Zeflemeaua, after which he became a regular contributor to the left-wing review România Muncitoare. After Victor Hugo, he persisted in trying to establish a lasting newspaper of his own, putting out Gândul ("The Thought", 1902), then Inima și Mintea ("Heart and Mind", 1903). In 1904, he was a regular at Curierul of Botoșani.

By 1905, Lazarovici was in Bucharest, co-opted by Constantin Mille to write for Adevărul, with a series of rhyming columns that he signed as "Trubadur". With his Romanian-sounding adoptive surname, Lăzăreanu had poems hosted in A. D. Xenopol's Arhiva of Iași. Contemplative and rustic, such pieces brought him to the attention of A. C. Cuza, a traditionalist and antisemitic poet-doctrinaire, who was unaware of Lăzăreanu's Jewishness. Cuza traveled to Botoșani just to greet the "national troubadour", only to be informed that "it is the Jew's Lazarovici's boy [...] who is as shriveled as a raisin, and who looks at the moon like a somnambulist". His other poetry included stanzas honoring those killed in the 1905 Russian Revolution, published in Viitorul Social of Iași. Participating in socialist shows of solidarity with the Russian workers, he was by then drawn into anarchist circles, and for a while co-publisher of Panait Mușoiu's newspaper, Revista Ideei. As an ally of Mușoiu's, and as a friend of labor leader I. C. Frimu, by 1907 he was tutoring Bucharest workers, giving them lessons in Romanian grammar and literature, and also "educating them politically".

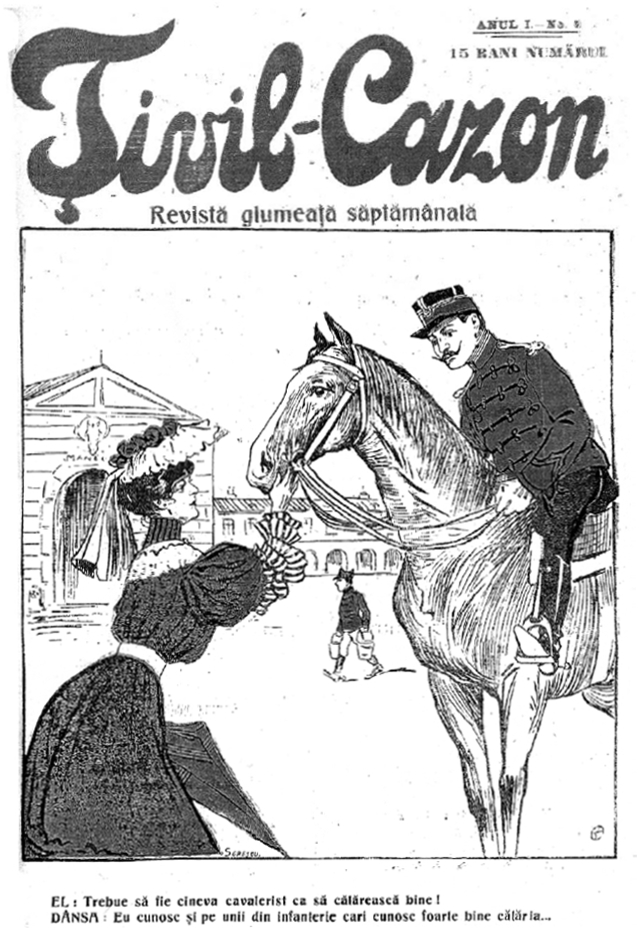
Țivil-Cazon, Issue 5, 1906. Cover art by Nicolae Petrescu Găină

In 1906, Lăzăreanu founded the satirical weekly Țivil-Cazon ("Civilian-Conscript"), for which he used the pseudonym "Bélé". The magazine, discreetly sponsored by the Jewish tailor Moris Segal, hosted the work of Ioachim Botez, Ioan Dragomirescu-Dragion, Leon Wechsler-Vero, and Victor Eftimiu, who was also a pseudonymous co-editor. Eftimiu and Lăzăreanu's work for it included rhyming quatrains that parodied or mocked the more serious literary reviews. Eftimiu noted, years later, that Bélé was "very talented". Țivil-Cazon became the first Romanian journal of its kind to feature colored prints, and included art by Iosif Iser, Nicolae Petrescu Găină, and Nicolae Mantu. Heavily inspired by Ion Luca Caragiale and his Moftul Român, it mainly targeted Romanian Army personnel, depicted as slow-witted and (especially if cavalry officers) as sex objects.

=== Exile and return ===
Lăzăreanu was eventually deported from the country through Predeal on May 10, 1907, shortly after the that year's peasant revolt. According to a detailed account of this incident, published in Furnica, Premier Dimitrie Sturdza had read Lăzăreanu's work in Zeflemeaua, and had decided to punish his insolence. Lăzăreanu was allegedly arrested at Colentina Hospital, having suffered a nervous breakdown. As claimed by the younger literary historian Ion Vitner: "a modicum of humanity should have imposed that the sentence be postponed." The expulsion was facilitated by Lăzăreanu's Jewish ethnicity: under the still-restrictive laws of the Romanian Kingdom, he was classified as heimatlos. A manifesto by the România Muncitoare group, circulated in June 1907, noted that Sturdza had seen the opportunity for "the destruction of the unionist and socialist movement. [...] The first to fall were some Jewish young men, such as Barbu Lăzăreanu and Mendelson, who were not affiliated with our movement, although the government had them expelled as socialists."

Lăzăreanu left for Paris, and, in November 1907, penned an appeal to the migrant workers in France, asking them to support their comrades in Romania. He lived there to 1912, and was admitted by examination to the École des Hautes Études. He took courses with Sylvain Lévi and Charles Diehl, and between 1908 and 1909 was a classmate of the future historian Orest Tafrali. He was published in the French socialist press, as well as, back home, in Christian Rakovski's Viitorul Social and in Barbu Nemțeanu's Pagini Libere. These contributions include the lyrical piece Rapsodie of August 1907, which, according to Vitner, should be read as an homage to the progressive side of Russian literature—referencing Nikolay Chernyshevsky, Nikolai Gogol, Taras Shevchenko and Leo Tolstoy. Lăzăreanu helped establish a socialist association of Romanian guest workers, and, with fellow Botoșani exile Deodat Țăranu, joined the Romanian socialist students' society in Paris. On May 10, 1908 (Romania's royal holiday), he and the worker Radu Florescu directed an intentional protest against King Carol, later hosting and giving exposure to their fellow socialist exile, Rakovsky. A year later, he gave a satirical speech mocking the Romanian nationalist doctrinaire, Nicolae Iorga, and constructing Iorga-like phrases to illustrate his point. On May 28, 1910, Lăzăreanu stood on the "revolutionary jury" which "tried" the Romanian anarchist Adolf Reichmann, suspected of being an agent provocateur. He deemed Reichmann not guilty.

Upon his return to Romania, Lăzăreanu joined the Union of Romanian Jews (UER). Alongside I. Hussar and others, he served as a Bucharest delegate at the UER congress held at Iași on January 13, 1913. In June of the following year, he was a guest speaker at the UER meeting in Bucharest, alongside Moses Schwartzfeld and Horia Carp. Together, they helped draft a resolution against Nicolae Paulescu, who had produced antisemitic tracts, accusing him of "stirring up racial hatred". Sometimes passing himself off as "Matei Rareș", "Trubadurul", or "Alexandru B. Trudă", Lăzăreanu was an editor at the magazines Înfrățirea, Viitorul Social, Lupta Zilnică, and Adevărul Literar. He was still a contributor to the left-wing dailies Adevărul and Dimineața, and eventually also their cultural editor. In 1915, using the pen name "Arald", Lăzăreanu was featured in the pages of Rampa magazine.

Returning to Botoșani, Lăzăreanu probably acted as a host for the novelist Gala Galaction, who had come to the city in order to research the life of Romania's national poet, Mihai Eminescu—emerging as "one of Eminescu's first biographers", Galaction expressed his gratitude to an unnamed friend, who may have been Lăzăreanu. Shortly before World War I, the latter was again involved in the Romanian labor movement. With Frimu, who was now representing the Social Democratic Party (PSDR), he established a "workers' university" in Bucharest, where he then taught literature and the history of socialism. Despite his growing reputation, he and other Jewish professionals were still barred from joining the Romanian Writers' Society. He was instead associated with the UER's own cultural movement, participating in its "great literary and art festival", held at Iași in May 1916—alongside Nemțeanu, Enric Furtună, and Ion Pribeagu. At around that time, he met Itzik Manger, a young poet of Bukovina Jewish extraction, whom he persuaded to embrace Yiddish as his language of expression.

=== Cu privire la... period ===
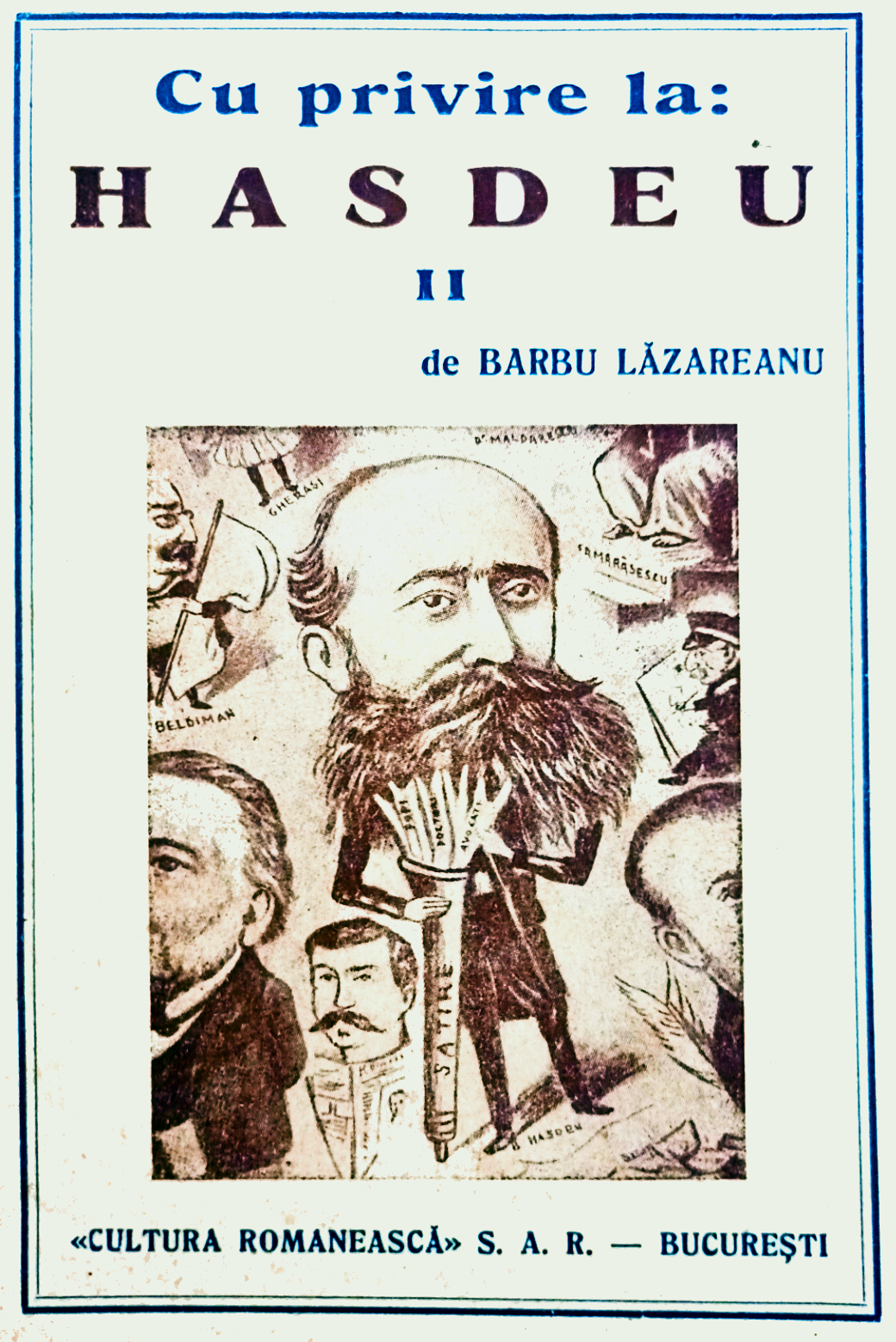
Cu privire la volume dealing with Bogdan Petriceicu Hasdeu, featuring a cartoon by Constantin Jiquidi

Noted for a while as a publisher of anti-war literature, Lăzăreanu remained in German-occupied Bucharest after 1916. He was a member of the underground PSDR and guest speaker at its defiant Labor Day picnic (May 1, 1917), and reportedly became a Leninist shortly after the October Revolution in Russia. His first book of literary portraits appeared in 1917, as Constantin Radovici, Agatha Bârsescu, Nora Marinescu. Before April 1918, he had published two more brochures on literary subjects, announced as Puțină archeologie teatrală ("Samples of Theatrical Archeology") and Pagini de istorie antică ("Pages of Ancient History").

During the final months of the German occupation, Lăzăreanu wrote for Scena review, usually as "Alex. Bucur", "Mathieu H. Rareșiu", or "Lazăr Delarediu", and also collaborated on Galaction's Spicul. Simultaneously, he became more seriously involved in the rising protest movement of the Social Democrats. He was probably responsible for the PSDR using Scena's printing offices to issue propaganda, as alleged by investigating prosecutors in August 1918. Around that time, he met and befriended writer I. Peltz, who recalled that his "little essays" on literature, "of greatest interest to the reading public", took up most of Lăzăreanu's time, preventing him from publishing his poetry. Peltz also recalls Lăzăreanu's satire of "the oligarchy", noting him as an "elegant polemicist" of "fine humor". His tireless glossing of texts earned accolades from Perpessicius, who described Lăzăreanu as "all-knowing" and "without rival". Some 48 years later, Perpessicius recalled being taken aback by Lăzăreanu's obituary for poet George Coșbuc, also appearing in Scena. A posthumous reviewer, Marin Bucur, was unimpressed. He describes Lăzăreanu as a scholar who missed out on "the general layout", focused on documenting "infinitesimal" aspects of history, including "trifles" and "bromides".

Following the Armistice of November and the subsequent creation of Greater Romania, Lăzăreanu maintained a profile in the labor and socialist movements. A speaker at the funeral of Marxist doyen Constantin Dobrogeanu-Gherea, he was closely followed by agents of the Siguranța, who noted his association with labor organizer Herșcu Aroneanu, "a very dangerous element". Joining the postwar Socialist Party, he returned to his native region during the 1919 paper mill workers' strike, which Aroneanu assisted, and again during the 1920 commemoration of the Paris Commune. Also then, his earlier activity at Înfrățirea became the object of a libel suit in Bacău: C. Nica of Parincea, whom Înfrățirea had labeled an antisemite, obtained a retraction from Lăzăreanu. In November 1920, Lăzăreanu was an inaugural contributor to Șerban Voinea's Marxist monthly, Viața Socialistă. He also became editor of the Socialist-Party organ, Socialismul, putting out its cultural pages. He still contributed biographies of socialist leaders as the newspaper became official organ of the new Romanian Communist Party (May 1921), before both the party and newspaper were outlawed. He was also affiliated with Luptătorul, a progressive daily put out in 1920–1922 by anonymous editors, with Constantin Graur, Ion Vinea and Nicolae L. Lupu as fellow contributors. Here, Lăzăreanu discussed allegations of torture by the Siguranța and compared it to the Spanish Inquisition. According to Felea, this contribution resulted in Luptătorul being both highly successful with the public and then banned by official censors.

From 1919 to 1930, Lăzăreanu resumed his work in popular education, reestablishing the workers' university, joining the Căile Ferate Române unions' school in Grivița, and becoming staff member for the UER People's University. In 1922, his courses were attended by Galaction and novelist Zaharia Stancu; the latter recalled the lecture hall being "packed full" of people who kept "perfect silence, so that no word would escape [their] ears." Vitner, at the time a communist militant, recalls first meeting Lăzăreanu during one of his 1930s lectures "in national culture for the working-class and left-wing intellectual youth." He found Lăzăreanu to be pleasant, "easy-going", "beautiful in that way blades of grass are", but a man of "impressive erudition". Although he worked in political and trade-union journalism, as well as a philologist and bibliographer, Lăzăreanu was primarily a commentator on Romanian literature. Writing about numerous authors who included Caragiale, Eminescu, Gheorghe Asachi, Ion Heliade Rădulescu, Anton Pann, and Bogdan Petriceicu Hasdeu, his book titles for the early 1920s usually began Cu privire la... ("With a Look at...").

Lăzăreanu was simultaneously involved in complex library research. This was especially unusual, since he had been diagnosed with tuberculosis, but continued to thrive in a dusty environment, "at no harm to him whatsoever", a "real phenomenon of physical and medical resilience." In 1922, he annotated, prefaced and edited Caragiale's satiric verses, grouped into poetic cycles. The work was poorly reviewed by his colleagues in the literary press, who noted that Caragiale himself had made efforts to erase all memory of his work in verse. Lăzăreanu defended himself with chronicles in Adevărul Literar și Artistic, arguing that the Caragiale poems had documentary and, "sometimes", artistic value. Some 12 years after, Lăzăreanu received public thanks from Paul Zarifopol, Caragiale's friend and biographer: "neither the richness and exactitude of his knowledge, nor the kindness with which he imparts it, have an end." Reportedly, Zarifopol, who was a "neurasthenic", could not stand to do library work, and had used Lăzăreanu's notations and worksheets for completing his own Caragiale studies.

=== Cuvântul Liber ===
In January 1923, Lăzăreanu was co-opted by the Humanitarian Circle, which supported progressive politics and championed world peace. Located in the Bucharest home of writer Eugen Relgis, the enterprise had also been endorsed by Mușoiu, Eugen Filotti, Ion Pas, Constantin Rădulescu-Motru, and Ioan Slavici. The Circle's manifesto, taken up in various newspapers, was influenced by Marxist humanism; its depiction of Europe as savaged by "war and revolution" enlisted an objection from Lăzăreanu: in Socialismul, he argued that the text was meant to say "counterrevolution". The following year, he became a regular at Filotti and Mihai Ralea's Cuvântul Liber. Filotti recalled in 1965 that, though the magazine was not Marxist, it "hosted numerous articles, by Barbu Lăzăreanu and other socialists, on the history of the workers' movement and the inspiring combat of its doyens". He also had contributions as a poet and scholar in the magazines Progresele Științei and Presa Dentară. His other work appeared in Flacăra, Viața Românească, Vremea, Contimporanul, Revista Literară, Mântuirea, Adam, and Revista Idealistă.

Writing mainly for Adevărul Literar și Artistic, Lăzăreanu discovered and published poetry by politicians such as Take Ionescu, Gheorghe Nădejde, and Constantin Istrati, also republishing 19th-century tracts by Jean Alexandre Vaillant and physician Alcibiade Tavernier, and documenting the minutae of Hasdeu's literary and political activity. He also held a column on phonaesthetics, published some of the first compilations of Romanian cant, and completed in print a historical review of the Romanian Communards and their sympathizers. Known to his Romanian peers as an "incidental" but noteworthy medical historian, his 1924 collection of essays bridged philology and health historiography, as: Lespezi și moloz din templul lui Epidaur ("Slabs and Debris from Epidaurus' Temple").

Lăzăreanu also studied folkloristics and historical linguistics, focusing especially on "the destiny of some words", and involved himself in literary and political polemics with liberal conservatives—Mihail Dragomirescu, Rădulescu-Motru, and the Ideea Europeană writers. On March 28, he and Pribeagu helped organize the UER's literary festival—both of them with contributions as humorists and entertainers. In May, he was speaking at the UER about Alexandru Marghiloman's contribution as an orator, and, in collaboration with Leon Ghelerter, on Dobrogeanu-Gherea's "literary and social work". A month later, he presided over ceremonies commemorating his former patron Nemțeanu. On the occasion, Lăzăreanu also spoke about the literary history of Galați, reviewing poets such as Captain Constant Tonegaru Sr, and journalists such as Graur, Grigore Trancu-Iași, and Victor Cosmin-Sirmabuic.

Over those years, Lăzăreanu researched and edited several volumes of essays by Dobrogeanu-Gherea, issuing, as part of the "Dobrogeanu-Gherea Collection", the socialist poetry of Dumitru Theodor Neculuță and Anton Bacalbașa, and the biography of Ottoi Călin (Doctorul Ottoi). His 1924 review of "various raconteurs" (Câțiva povestitori) included monographs on Ion Creangă and N. D. Popescu-Popnedea. His critical verdicts were dismissed by Bucur, who described the book as "puerile" and "glib", and later by Ioana Pârvulescu, who sees Lăzăreanu as "a minor, socialist literato [who] did not shy away from distorting literary reality". In 1927, he published at Adevărul an overview of Hasdeu's humorous writings (Umorul lui Hajdeu). Originally a report to the Romanian Academy, it was noted for its satirical tinges and a slight mockery of its protagonist. Also that year, Lăzăreanu put out an ethnographic study of courtship (Ursitul fetelor și al vădanelor).

Some contributions were specific records of Jewish literary life: in December 1925, Lăzăreanu was tracing the history of short-lived Jewish periodicals for the community magazine Știri din Lumea Evreiască; he also published a 1926 notice on the life and activity of a Jewish journalist, Sigismund Carmelin. In May 1926, at Jignița Garden, he presided upon festivities marking 50 years of Yiddish theater in Romania, specifically honoring Abraham Goldfaden's work in the field. Shortly after, as the Vilna Troupe set camp in Bucharest, Lăzăreanu stood out as its critic, accusing it of having destroyed I. L. Peretz's legacy with its modernism; his take was in turn rejected by modernists such as Sandu Tudor and Ilarie Voronca.

=== Anti-fascism ===
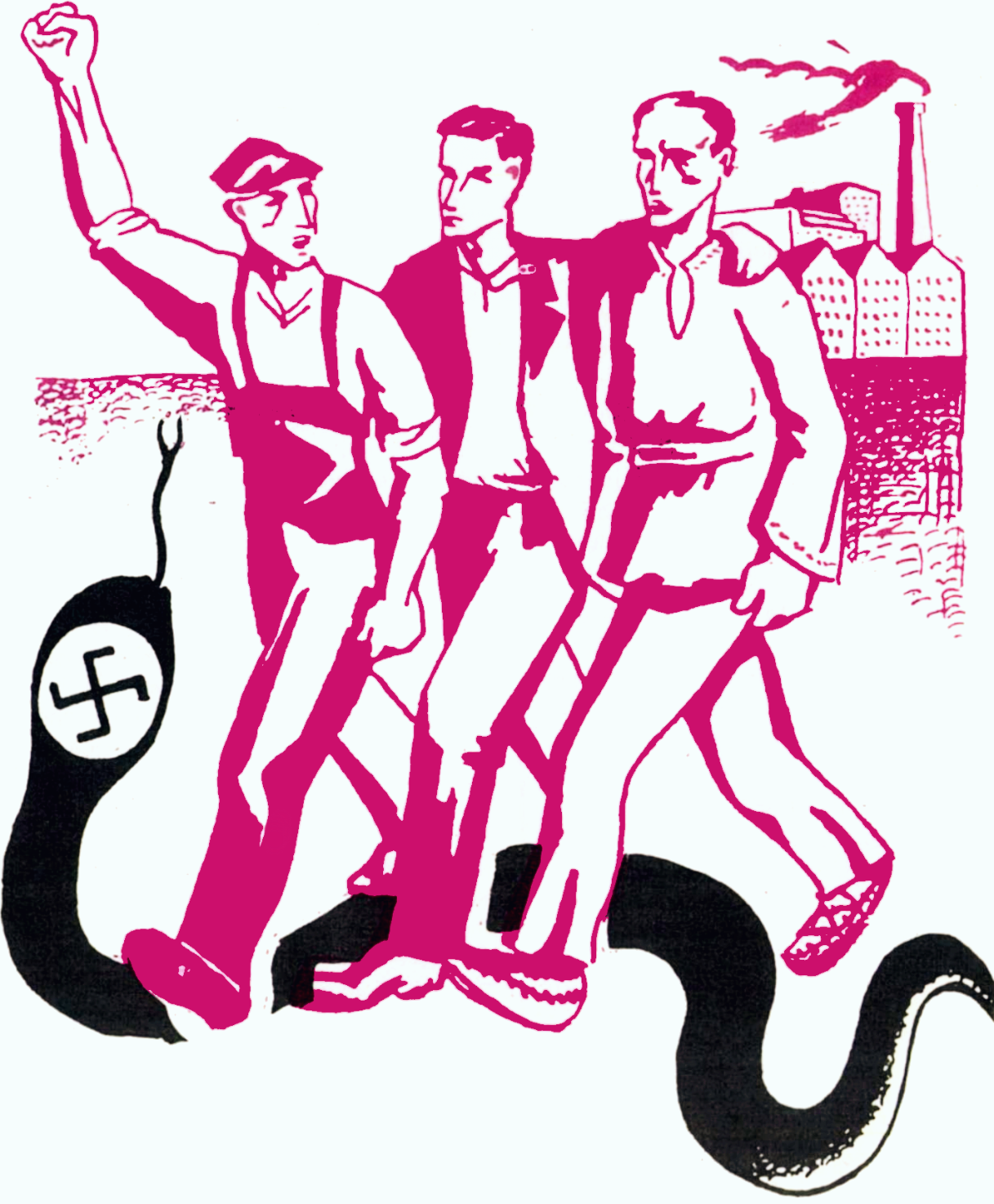
Depiction of the popular front against fascism, in a Cuvântul Liber cartoon of 1935

During the late 1920s, Lăzăreanu became a committed anti-fascist. In July 1926, he was co-opted by the League Against Terror, alongside Galaction, Mille, Mușoiu, Relgis, Zarifopol, Traian Bratu, Constantin Costa-Foru, Mihail Cruceanu, Elena Filipovici, Eugen Heroveanu, Lucrețiu Pătrășcanu, Constantin I. Parhon, Mihail Sadoveanu, Gheorghe Tașcă, and Ștefan Voitec. In July 1932, he also signed up to Ilie Cristea's protest against the Japanese invasion of Manchuria, and more generally against Japanese fascism. These stances also intertwined with his work as a philologist: beginning in 1929, he took a public stand against the antisemitic publicist and amateur linguist Alexandru Resmeriță, who had argued that Romanian was almost entirely shaped by Latin and by proto-historic Dacian (seeing those two languages as closely related to one another). Lăzăreanu dismissed such theories, and Dacianism in its entirety, as unintelligent, noting that Resmeriță had resorted to describing baklava, which had been adopted from the Turkish, as derived from Latin.

In August 1935, Lăzăreanu expressed solidarity with Dem. I. Dobrescu, whose brochure in defense of communist and anti-fascist prisoners had been confiscated by government. During those months, he also engaged in a polemic with journalist Ioan Alexandru Bran-Lemeny, who backed the far-right Romanian Front, over the issue of positive discrimination for Romanians. Lăzăreanu described the Front's ideology as "narrow and crooked", emphasizing its role as a Jewish quota; Bran-Lemeny, who still viewed his Jewish colleague as a "beloved friend", defended the notion. He posited that Lăzăreanu's belief in universal fraternity was respectable, but optimistic, as long as Romania suffered under the "slavery of alienism". Lăzăreanu returned to Botoșani for a conference in April 1936, at exactly the same time as another guest speaker, Nelu Ionescu, who was a member of the antisemitic Iron Guard. As recounted by folklorist Arthur Gorovei, the Gendarmerie sent in troops and imposed a new schedule, making sure that the speakers and their respective audience never interacted with each other.

Also in 1936, the Communist Party attracted Lăzăreanu into a semi-legal National Antifascist Committee, where he became colleagues with Iorgu Iordan, Sandu Eliad, and Petre Constantinescu-Iași. His other focus was on researching Romanian folklore, touring the country to lecture the public on related topics, billed alongside Peltz and S. Podoleanu. He wrote in Adevărul an homage to the Romanian Jewish linguist Moses Gaster, and curated a selection of Graur's writings for Editura Șantier. He was joined in his literary activities by his son Alexandru (born 1913), who became a regular contributor to Adam by 1932, and introduced Romanians to the poetic work of Gustave Kahn for Adevărul, in October 1936.

Lăzăreanu Sr was sidelined during the antisemitic ascendancy of the National Christian Party (1937), but returned to favor under the National Renaissance Front (1938): although fascist in nature, the latter sponsored leftist and Jewish intellectuals, all of whom were protected by Ralea, now serving as Labor Minister. Like other men from Ralea's circle, he remained a regular contributor to Adevărul Literar și Artistic, the sole leftist review still tolerated by the regime. Having since obtained Romanian citizenship, Lăzăreanu was stripped of it during the passage of racial laws. Published under contract with Cartea Românească, Cu privire la... was celebrated by Societatea de Mâine reviewers as still having "great significance". According to such reports, by mid 1937 Lăzăreanu had prepared some 240 biographies for future editions. Appearing late that year, his two brochures on Eminescu were chronicled in Realitatea Ilustrată as restorative, in that they brought focus back on Eminescu's genius and passionate work. Writer Boris Marian suggests that Lăzăreanu was partly interested in recovering Eminescu, a "European spirit", from the nationalist far-right, which "was using [Eminescu's name] in order to 'substantiate' its own aberrations."

In a new fascicle put out in early 1938, Lăzăreanu chronicled the Romanian translations from William Shakespeare, adding his own musings about the shortcomings of various styles of translation. Writer Nicolai Costenco was unimpressed by this approach, arguing: "Mr Lăzăreanu's opinion is not just objective, it is the only just one to have. But [his] way of expressing it, with its irony bordering on cynicism, à la Sholem Aleichem, with his glaring sympathy for coreligionists such as Heine and Adolphe Stern—and his torrent of jibes against Romanian authors—is not only distasteful, it is downright insulting." Lăzăreanu was welcomed by Petre V. Haneș's Preocupări Literare society, and published in its eponymous magazine. His work there was mentioned in the Iron Guard's paper, Buna Vestire, with the comment: "We regret the collaborations by Jews [such as] Lăzăreanu". Cu privire la... ended later in 1938, with a final volume focusing on Coșbuc; in 1940, Lăzăreanu's introduction to Graur's literary work and a monograph on the Libertatea socialist club came out as separate brochures. By 1939, he was still frequenting Preocupări Literare, where he lectured about early Romanian translations from Molière.

=== Holocaust-era persecution and 1944 revival ===
In September 1940, the Iron Guard established its "National Legionary State", which enhanced antisemitic repression. As Jews were barred from theatrical professions, Lăzăreanu rallied with other community representatives in advocating for the creation of a segregated theater, The Barașeum—the permit was issued to Isaia Răcăciuni in October, but the activity could only begin in January 1941. Herself expelled from high school, Jewish poet Veronica Porumbacu recalls meeting Lăzăreanu around the time of the Bucharest pogrom ("that year of the blood-stained snows"); as she notes, he was still privately lecturing in literature, "to remind those stricken with terror that some great Romanian authors had genius and importance." His conferences, she claims, also collected funds for the resistance networks—a "broad font of the antifascist forces in the country." Historiographer Israil Bercovici similarly reports that Lăzăreanu, Ury Benador, Beate Fredanov, Iacob Ashel Groper and Lazăr Șaraga ran a "Yiddish Theater Association", which organized literary soirees that often dealt in "revolutionary content". His 60th birthday, celebrated (with a delay) in December 1941 at a local Jewish school, witnessed a speech by the writer and schoolteacher Mihail Sebastian.

As the country plunged into World War II alongside the Axis powers, Lăzăreanu was again exposed to racial and political persecution, beginning when he was placed under constant surveillance by the Ion Antonescu regime. According to Felea: "Under [Antonescu's] military-fascist dictatorship, and despite terror, communist Barbu Lăzăreanu continued to engage in word-of-mouth propaganda at Libros Lyceum and in other places." Lăzăreanu's collection of documents in Botoșani was presumed looted, though he was also cited as having donated portions of it to the Academy in 1942. Publication and circulation of Lăzăreanu's work was explicitly banned, but, reportedly, he continued to "speak passionately and resolutely at intimate reunions", condemning war on the Eastern Front. According to his own recollections, the ban on his books was ignored by the Academy's library, whose manager was General Radu R. Rosetti. It allowed readers to consult them at any moment in the war.

Alexandru Lăzăreanu was recruited in 1941–1944 to perform labor duties required from all able-bodied Jews, and was for a while employed at the Statistics Institute. He established contacts with the Zionist resistance cells, whose leader A. L. Zissu recalls that he collected funds for either the Communist Party or the International Red Aid. On October 9, 1942, Lăzăreanu Sr was arrested with other Jews, including his entire family, and scheduled to be deported to Transnistria Governorate. He was eventually spared, thanks to the interventions of Queen Helen and a Romanian physician, Victor Gomoiu. Antonescu's regime continued to exercise censorship, and in December 1942 issued a ban against Lăzăreanu's books in privately-owned bookshops; he was presented with his supposed birthname, "Burăch Leizerovici", to underscore his Jewishness. By 1943, he had been welcomed into a clandestine scholars' circle, formed around Chief Rabbi Alexandru Șafran, Eliezer Frenkel, Max Wurmbrandt, and Haim Rabinsohn—the latter of whom was brother of the communist militant Ana Pauker. They worked on a critical Romanian translation of the Hebrew Bible, or more specifically the Torah. In November, Fraterna Jewish Temple held a memorial service for Moses Schwartzfeld. Lăzăreanu appeared as a guest speaker, alongside Răcăciuni, Șaraga, Enric Furtună, and Ioan Massoff.

After the fall of Antonescu in August 1944, Barbu Lăzăreanu became a visible associate (later member) of the Communist Party, contributing to its main organs: România Liberă, Scînteia, Studii. He was however outspoken in his defense of General Rosetti, who was put on trial at the Romanian People's Tribunals for his role in Antonescu's administration; appearing as a witness in July 1946, he gave proof that Rosetti had not endorsed racial discrimination. From 1945 to 1948, Lăzăreanu served as the inaugural rector of the new Workers' University in Bucharest, which became the Ștefan Gheorghiu Academy under his tenure. His inaugural speech declared the school to be one of a fundamentally new type, with a mission to create the "new man"; its curriculum was to be based on the four "great educators of mankind": Karl Marx, Friedrich Engels, Vladimir Lenin, and Joseph Stalin. In May 1945, he was finally elected to the Romanian Writers' Society, one of seven Jewish members enlisted on that occasion. He returned to writing with a Creangă monograph, put out by the Romanian–Russian Relations Library, focusing his research on that writer's debt to Russian fairy tales. In December, the new Jewish Democratic Committee (CDE) had him as a guest lecturer, with an overview of "progressive Jewish poets in Romanian literature".

By November 1945, Romanian literature textbooks were being rewritten, and, according to Scînteia, "purged [of] hateful messages against the co-inhabiting nationalities"; as part of this sweep, Iordan and H. Sascuteanu had submitted a gymnasium-level manual which included poems by Lăzăreanu, Alexandru Toma, and Al. Șahighian. Early in 1946, the communist party's Section for Political Education hosted Lăzăreanu's lectures on the "poets of labor and poets as laborers", which placed focus on laborite themes in the work of Eminescu or Creangă, and introduced the public to works by Toma, Zaharia Boiu, and Dumitru Corbea. The party also printed his brochure, Despre alegeri censitare ("On the Census Suffrage"), which reviewed literary documents (principally by N. T. Orășanu) on fraudulent electoral practices during the previous century. His 65th year and his overall activity were celebrated on April 27, 1947 by the CDE, with speeches by Galaction, Sadoveanu, Șafran, Felix Aderca, N. D. Cocea, and Emil Dorian. Fragments of his own works were read by Jewish actors, including Fredanov. His son, meanwhile, worked for Scînteia and Tinerețea newspapers, and was afterwards press officer for communist-inspired entertainment company, Filmul Popular.

=== Communist period ===
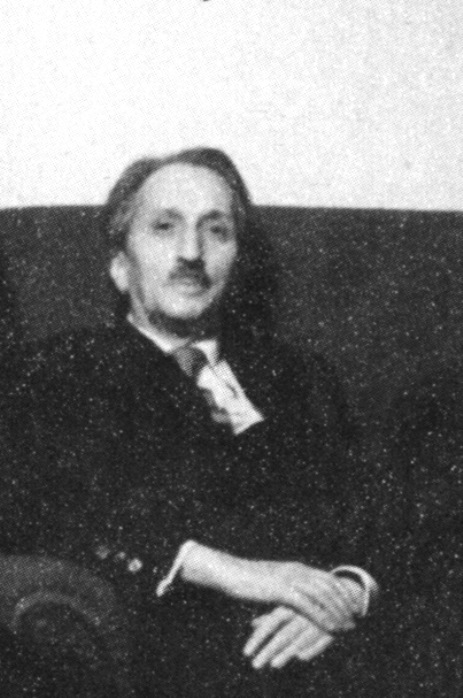
Lăzăreanu in a 1950s photograph

On September 18, 1947, Lăzăreanu Sr joined Galaction, Victor Eftimiu, Mihail Macavei and others on the leadership board of the Bucharest Atheneum. In 1948, the new communist regime honored him by assigning his name to street in Dudești. That year, the revamped the Romanian Academy elected him a titular member. His contributions to its bulletin included a 1949 piece which explored Eminescu's mental alienation and death—according to Lăzăreanu, both had been caused by Eminescu's inability to thrive under the "bourgeois-landowning regime", and by the failure of the old, "reactionary", Academy to offer him any material protection. Though a card-carrying communist, the elder Lăzăreanu also took a seat on the CDE's executive council, which also included his party colleagues M. H. Maxy, Maximilian Popper, Arthur Kreindler, and Bercu Feldman. During a reshuffle ordered by the communists on April 18, 1948, he took over as CDE Chairman. Shortly after the Arab–Israeli War, he gave public endorsement to the CDE-and-communist platform of anti-Zionism and anti-cosmopolitanism. He was reconfirmed a member of the CDE Central Committee in late March 1949. In the local elections of October 1950, Lăzăreanu and Geo Bogza were the two candidates for the People's Councils of Bucharest proposed by the Institute for Cultural Relations with the Outside World.

Foreign policy was also shaped by Alexandru, a close collaborator of Pauker—who had herself been appointed as Foreign Minister. A staff member of the Romanian Embassy in Washington, D. C. in 1947, he reported on the activities of anticommunist exiles such as Viorel Tilea and Brutus Coste, and tried to coax Peter Neagoe into writing a series of pro-communist novels. Also a likely agent of the Securitate, he was involved in sponsoring an alleged spy ring, which included Detroit journalist Harry Făinaru. In December 1948, the US State Department demanded that Ambassador Grigore Preoteasa and Lăzăreanu Jr be recalled to Bucharest; the latter had returned to Romania in 1949. Made Ambassador to France in May 1951, he mediated between the Romanian authorities and hostile exiles, including musicians George Enescu, Nicolae Caravia, and Stan Golestan.

Lăzăreanu Sr headed the Academy's library from 1948 to 1957. In 2013, mathematician-writer Mircea Malița recalled that he himself was actually in charge of that institution, Lăzăreanu's presidency being otherwise "symbolic". Nevertheless, Lăzăreanu is alleged to have obtained for the Academy the letters of left-wing novelist Panait Istrati, having coaxed his widow into handing them over. In 1956, he promised to allow Marie Rolland access to the letters exchanged between Istrati and Romain Rolland, though these were never released during his tenure. Lăzăreanu was similarly involved, in 1952, with the Romanian orthographic reform, voted in as a member of the Linguistics Institute, and nominally implementing locally the objectives stated in Marxism and Problems of Linguistics. He published in 1950 an anthology of anti-monarchic literature, which went through two more editions by 1957.

The academician returned to socialist historiography and reissued as a book his earlier study on the Romanian Communards; his review of early Romanian socialism, published by Scînteia in January 1952, offered a negative review of Dobrogeanu-Gherea's political contribution, now deemed "Menshevik opportunism". His other work was in early-readers' literature, with the book Dan inimosul ("Hearty Dan"). Although a representative of the new regime, in 1950 he signed a public protest in support of his friend Peltz, who had been exposed as a Siguranța informant and was facing communist imprisonment. In January 1952, his 70th anniversary was marked by an official ceremony at the Academy. Săvulescu, the Academy president, saluted him as a Romanian version of Milkman Tevye and Till Eulenspiegel, noting his "kind and open heart" and his ability to versify any situation; his speech also doubled as an attack on cosmopolitanism, praising Lăzăreanu's "socialist patriotism".

Before his death, Lăzăreanu served several times in the Academy Presidium. He was also a recipient of the Star of the People's Republic of Romania, Second Class, and Ordinul Muncii, First Class. In June 1956, he participated as a speaker in the ceremony which welcomed parts of the Romanian Treasure being returned from the Soviet Union; in December, alongside Chief Rabbi Moses Rosen, he attended a ceremony marking the 80th anniversary of the Jewish Theater (conflating The Barașeum and earlier institutions). Lăzăreanu died of a heart attack in Bucharest, on January 19, 1957. Incinerated at Cenușa crematorium, his funeral, including the speeches, was held on the premises and closed with the singing of "The Internationale", the highest mark of adherence to the communist ideal.

== Legacy ==
Lăzăreanu's ashes were deposited near the mausoleum reserved for socialist heroes, in Bucharest's Liberty Park. Found and preserved by the World Jewish Congress, his documentary collection is housed in New York City. In his obituary for Gazeta Literară, Vitner observed that Lăzăreanu's books only featured a "hundredth or thousandth of what he had published in the democratic press, over a half-century of uninterrupted work". In 1959, Ion Crișan and George Boiculescu compiled an edition of Lăzăreanu's critical studies. With his early review of the collection, critic Mihai Drăgan argued that Lăzăreanu was still important as an Eminescu and Bacalbașa researcher, but placed in doubt various of his assessments—including the "utterly erroneous" claim that Eminescu was primarily a product of German literature, or his vision of Dimitrie Ralet as a pioneer in literary realism. According to Drăgan, some of the more "anecdotal" essays should have been scrapped from publication. Lăzăreanu's Creangă studies, meanwhile, inspired Constantin Popovici, who continued research on Creangă's debt to Slavic and, more narrowly, Ukrainian folklore.

Boiculescu revived interest in Lăzăreanu's works in 1972, when he compiled the Cu privire la... series into a single volume—prefaced by Perpessicius and issued with Editura Minerva. In a review of this edition, Porumbacu noted that many who "have but heard of the name Barbu Lăzăreanu" would discover Cu privire la... as not just useful, but also a "pleasant, even delectable read." Minerva followed up in 1975 with a bound volume of other articles by Lăzăreanu, which was panned by Alexandru George. According to George: "His contributions, or better said his interventions in discussing certain issues are much more numerous than once thought, but we should not expect that publishing them would reveal anything new". George also argued that Lăzăreanu was a minor, "all too amiable", historian of minor literature, and also one of questionable tastes—easily impressed by poets such as Haralamb Lecca. Six years later, the Lăzăreanu centennial was marked in Botoșani by a literary delegation comprising Alexandru Graur (of the Academy) and Zigu Ornea (of the Romanian Writers' Union).

The writer was survived by his widow Sara (who died and was cremated in February 1973), and by their son Alexandru. In 1956, the latter had been Deputy Foreign Minister, in charge during the absence of Minister Preoteasa. He became noted for his unorthodox response to the Hungarian anticommunist revolt, which he described as a "necessary process of democratization", though both he and Preoteasa were subsequently involved in the effort to contain its spread into Romania. Later a Head of Department, Lăzăreanu Jr was instrumental in obtaining Romania's affiliation to UNESCO and the United Nations. Lăzăreanu Jr became Ambassador Extraordinary to the United Kingdom in February 1964. In 1973, he was serving as Romanian Ambassador in the Republic of Upper Volta.

The Romanian Revolution of 1989, which resulted in the removal of communist symbolism, ensured that Lăzăreanu Sr's remains were removed from the mausoleum, alongside all other such urns. Alexandru had taken his pension by 1985, and was dedicating himself to reediting works by Lăzăreanu Sr. According to Romanian Israeli journalist Alexandru Mirodan, he had fallen into disgrace with the regime, and found his name progressively struck out from public record. After the fall of Romanian communism, he lived in Bucharest. Despite his own rapid descent into poverty, he helped Mirodan with research on his father's biography, also sending him a rare copy from Moses Gaster's works. He died in Bucharest in October 1991.
