= Victoria Stoiciu =

Romanian politician

Senator
- Incumbent
- Assumed office 20 December 2024

Personal details
- Born: 14 May 1979 (age 47) Olișcani, Moldavian SSR, Soviet Union
- Party: Independent (since 2026)
- Other party: Social Democratic Party
- Education: National University of Political Studies and Public Administration; Babeș-Bolyai University (PhD)

Victoria Stoiciu (born May 14, 1979, in Olișcani, Moldavian SSR, Soviet Union) is a Romanian politician who was elected senator for Vaslui County in 2024 as a member of the Social Democratic Party. She served as a program coordinator at the Friedrich Ebert Foundation Romania and has published in magazines and platforms for political and social analysis such as Critic Atac, Dilema Veche, DOR, and Republica.ro. On April 28, 2026, she resigned from the Social Democratic Party due to the party’s collaboration with the Alliance for the Union of Romanians on the motion of no confidence filed against the Ilie Bolojan government, a collaboration she viewed as a normalization of fascism.

== Biography ==
=== Education ===
In 2001, she earned her bachelor’s degree in political science from the National University of Political Studies and Public Administration in Bucharest, and from 2001 to 2005, she pursued graduate studies in international relations at the same institution.

In 2019, she earned her Ph.D. in political science from Babeș-Bolyai University in Cluj-Napoca. She graduated from the European School for Democracy at the Council of Europe and was a fellow at the Transatlantic Forum on Migration and Integration (German Marshall Fund).

=== Research and Civic Engagement ===
In 2006, she began working with the Friedrich Ebert Foundation Romania, where she served as program coordinator until 2023. Stoiciu was a researcher and national correspondent for the EUROFOUND Romania Correspondents’ Network.

She has published in journals and platforms for political and social analysis such as Critic Atac, Dilema veche, DOR, Republica, and România Liberă.

In 2023, together with Sorin Gog, she edited the volume Ce urmează după neoliberalism - Pentru un imaginar politic alternativ, published by Cluj University Press.

=== Politics ===
In June 2023, Stoiciu became a state advisor in the Prime Minister’s Office, as part of Marcel Ciolacu’s cabinet. In August 2024, she was part of Marcel Ciolacu’s team during the PSD’s internal elections and became vice president in charge of relations with NGOs and civic dialogue.

==== Senator (2024–present) ====
In the 2024 elections, Stoiciu ran on the PSD ticket in Vaslui and was elected to the Senate. In the Senate, she served as Vice President of the Committee on Human Rights, Equal Opportunities, Religious Affairs, and Minorities from December 2024 until May 2026, and was a member of the Committee on Labor, Family, and Social Protection from December 2024 until March 2026 and the Committee on Education, Science, and Innovation from December 2024 until May 2026. Stoiciu has been the Secretary on the Joint Special Committee in the field of legislation on the prevention, combating and sanctioning of domestic violence - "Romania without domestic violence" since September 2025 and is a member of the Committee to Combat Human Trafficking since March 2025.

On June 25, 2025, she referred to AUR Senator Mihail Neamțu as “a misogynistic boor” for publishing a doctored photo of Oana Țoiu.
