= Erhard Bauschke =

German musician

Erhard Bauschke (27 September 1912 in Breslau – 7 October 1945 in Frankfurt) was a German jazz and light music performer and bandleader.

Bauschke learned to play violin, piano, and saxophone as a student in Breslau, and played with José Wolff in 1931 and James Kok in 1934. Kok departed Germany under duress in 1935, after which Bauschke became the leader of his orchestra; he toured widely in Germany and along the Baltic coast, and was the house band at Moka Efti in Berlin from 1936 to 1939. He recorded copiously for Deutsche Grammophon in the late 1930s; some of the recordings are of hot jazz, which was derided by the Nazis as degenerate music.

Most of Bauschke's band was conscripted at the outset of World War II, and he dissolved his group in 1940; he continued recording numbers with studio groups into the following year. During the war he was taken into a prisoner of war camp by occupying American forces, and after being released, led dance bands for clubs serving United States military personnel. He died in a car crash in October 1945.
