= Bărbulescu =

Bărbulescu is a Romanian surname. Notable people with the surname include:

- Andrei Bărbulescu (1917–1970), Romanian football player
- Ilie Bărbulescu (linguist) (1873–1945), linguist
- Ilie Bărbulescu (footballer) (1957–2020), Romanian former football player
- Romulus Bărbulescu (1925–2010), Romanian science-fiction writer
- Nineta Barbulescu (born 23 February 1968) is a Romanian career diplomat, and current Ambassador of Romania to Malaysia and (non-resident) Brunei.
