= Benjamín Alfonso Tagle Lara =

Lyricist and composer

- Born: May 23, 1892; San Telmo, Buenos Aires, Argentina
- Died: November 9, 1932 (aged 40)
- Occupations: Lyricist, composer

Benjamín Alfonso Tagle Lara (23 June 1892 – 9 November 1932) was an Argentine lyricist and composer of tangos who achieved popularity in the 1920s.

== Career ==
Tagle Lara began writing songs around 1920. In 1923 musicians Carlos Gardel and José Razzano recorded "Cocorocó", composed by Tagle Lara and Enrique Delfino. The following year, the zamba "El boyero" (later renamed "Por el camino"), which he composed in 1922 with music by pianist Carlos Vicente Geroni Flores, premiered in Montevideo's Concurso de Canciones Regionales ("Regional Song Contest"), performed by Ítalo Goyeche and Néstor Feria. The song would later make its way to Spain, where it was popularized by the singers Agustín Irusta, Roberto Fugazot, and Lucio Demare, earning praise from the prominent Sevillian musician Joaquín Turina.

Tagle Lara composed a number of songs with fellow musician Geroni Flores, many of which were performed by the Argentine singer Ignacio Corsini, including "Acordes", "Como lloran los zorzales", "¡Huella... Huella!", "Pillería", "Siempre amigos" and "La tropilla". Corsini also recorded Tagle Lara's tangos, "Guitarra gaucha" and "Zaraza", as well as the song "¿Cuándo?" in collaboration with his brother Alfonso Corsini. Tagle Lara's songs were also performed by Azucena Maizani ("Pancho, comprate un rancho"), and Rosita Quiroga, who in 1927 performed his "Puente Alsina".

The duo Magaldi and Noda helped further popularize Tagle Lara's music by featuring it on their 1926 record "Trapo Viejo", which both saw wide radio broadcast and was performed live at Pascual Contursi's "Maldito cabaret" ("Cursed cabaret") in Buenos Aires' Teatro Smart (today the Multiteatro theatre complex). His tango "Una tarde" (1928), with music by composers Agesilao Ferrazzano and Julio Pollero, was recorded both by the composers' sextet and by Carlos Gardel, arguably the most prominent figure in the history of tango.

"Zaraza", which Tagle Lara composed alone, was awarded the second prize of the Gran Concurso Uruguayo de Tangos del Disco Nacional ("Uruguayan Grand Tango Contest") of 1929, performed by Francisco Canaro's orchestra at the Cine Teatro Cervantes in Montevideo. The song was later recorded by such singers as Ignacio Corsini, the Romanian singer Christian Vasile, and the Argentine actress and singer Sofía Bozán, who performed the song in Paris in 1930.

Benjamín Alfonso Tagle Lara collaborated with such composers as Francisco Pracánico, Roberto Firpo, Antonio Rodio, Rafael Tuegols, and Eduardo Pereyra during his lifetime.

Tagle Lara died in Buenos Aires, Argentina on November 9, 1932, at the age of 40.
