= Theodor Burghele =

Romanian doctor and academic

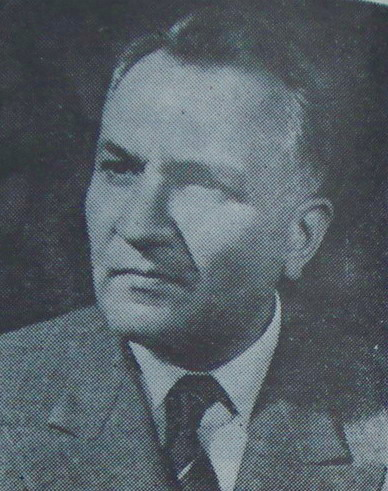
- Born: February 12, 1905; Iași, Kingdom of Romania
- Died: June 3, 1977 (aged 72); Bucharest, Socialist Republic of Romania
- Resting place: Bellu Cemetery, Bucharest
- Education: University of Iași; University of Vienna
- Awards: Order of the Star of the Romanian People's Republic, 3rd class
- Scientific career
- Fields: Surgery, Urology
- Workplaces: University of Bucharest; Carol Davila University of Medicine and Pharmacy; Colțea Hospital; Panduri Hospital
- Thesis: Mycotic splenomegaly (1929)

Minister of Health
- In office 24 April 1972 – 18 March 1975
- Prime Minister: Ion Gheorghe Maurer; Manea Mănescu
- Preceded by: Dan Enăchescu
- Succeeded by: Radu Păun

Theodor Burghele (12 February 1905 – 3 June 1977) was a Romanian surgeon and urologist, titular member and President of the Romanian Academy, and Minister of Health.

He was born in Iași in an old Moldavian boyar family, the son of Theodor Burghele and Fenareta, née Stoianovici. He studied at the Faculty of Medicine of the University of Iași (1922–1928), obtaining in 1929 an MD degree with thesis Mycotic splenomegaly. He then took specialization courses at the Urology Clinic of the University of Vienna (1930–1931). Upon returning to Romania, he started working at the surgical and urological clinic led by Nicolae Hortolomei at Colțea Hospital, in Bucharest. In 1937 Burghele became lecturer in the Department of Surgery at Colțea Hospital and in 1940 he was promoted to associate professor. In 1941 he was conscripted, and in 1942 he served as doctor in Tiraspol. In 1946, when a urinary tract surgery clinic was set up at Panduri Hospital, he was appointed professor at the Faculty of Medicine of the University of Bucharest, and took over the management of the clinic.

In 1948, he joined the Romanian Communist Party (PCR). From 1957 to 1972 he was rector of the Carol Davila University of Medicine and Pharmacy. In 1955 Burghele was elected corresponding member of the Romanian Academy; he became titular member in 1963 and served as President of the Academy from 1976 to 1977. Between 1972 and 1975 he held the position of Minister of Health. From 1972 to 1977 he was an alternate member of the Central Committee of the PCR. In 1964, he was awarded the Order of the Star of the Romanian People's Republic, 3rd class.

Burghele died in Bucharest on 3 June 1977, and is buried at Bellu Cemetery.

The Panduri Hospital in Bucharest which he led as director for many years was renamed in 1991, and is now called the "Prof. Dr. Theodor Burghele" Clinical Hospital.

== Publications ==
- Burghele, Theodor (1930), "Über die Behandlung der Kopfschmerzen nach Rückenmarksanästhesie", Zentralblatt für Chirurgie (in German), 354: 355
- Burghele, Theodor; Ichim, Vasile (1963), Tulburările vezicale în traumatismele medulare (in Romanian), Editura Academiei Republicii Populare Romîne, OCLC 14624971
- Burghele, Theodor; Rugendorff, Erwin W. (1966), Le Rein des états de choc, physiopathologie, morphopathologie, clinique, indications thérapeutiques (in French), Bucarest: Éditions de l'Academie; Paris: Masson et Cie, OCLC 8087074
- Burghele, Theodor; Simici, Pavel (1967), Riscul uretero-vezical în chirurgia abdominală şi pelviană (in Romanian), Editura Medicală
- Burghele, Theodor; Ichim, Vasile (1970), "The Neurogenic Bladder in Spinal Cord Injury", Operative Urology II, vol. 13 / 2, Berlin, Heidelberg: Springer, pp. 160–232, doi:10.1007/978-3-642-65060-4_4, ISBN 978-3-642-65062-8
- Burghele, Theodor; Ichim, Vasile; Demetrescu, Mihai (21 March 1972), Method and apparatus, including a flexible electrode, for the electric neurostimulation of the neurogenic bladder (PDF), U.S. Patent No. 3,650,276
