= Jean Moscopol =

Romanian singer

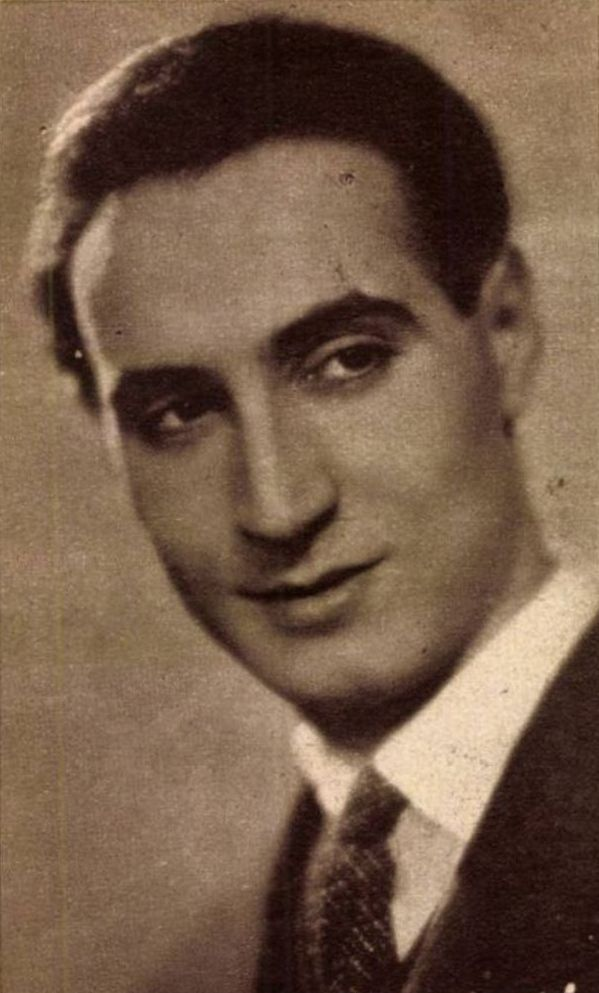
Jean Moscopol (real name: Ioan Moscu, 1903–1980) was a well-known Romanian singer of the interwar period, who spent his last years in the United States.

Jean Moscopol (Romanian pronunciation: [ˈʒan mosˈkopol]; birth name: Ioan Moscu; February 26, 1903 – 1980) was a Romanian singer of the interwar period, who spent his last years in the United States.

== Biography ==
Moscopol's parents were Greek. His mother, née Constantinidi, was from Constanța, while his father originated in Mesembria on the shores of the Black Sea. From there he settled in Brăila, where he opened a pastry shop and then worked as a jeweller, like one of his sisters. Jean Moscopol was born in Brăila, where he showed ease of learning from his early days. He could play several instruments (including the banjo and mandolin) and, besides Romanian, spoke French, Italian, English, German, and Greek fluently. His first formal education took place at Brăila's Greek school, and he continued learning in that city, also taking classes at its Lyra conservatory, before graduating from the Pelarinos High School in Galați. He then enrolled in the Politehnica University in Bucharest.

From 1921–22, he was a clerk at the M. Embiricos et Co Maritime Agency. He then spent two years at the P. Macri et Son Agency in Brăila, and from 1925 to 1929 worked at the Chrissoveloni Bank in Bucharest. While an aeronautics student, someone advised him to put his musical talent to use and make some recordings. At that moment, music became his profession. He made his performing debut in 1929 at the Zissu bar on Șerban Vodă Street, Bucharest. He would spontaneously create epigrams for the clients and banter with them. He also published a book of epigrams, 101 răutăți ("101 Naughty Sayings"). Around this time he also made his first gramophone recordings and first appeared on radio. He took music lessons in 1930, passed an examination and was confirmed as a professional artist. H. Nicolaide hired him at the Alhambra Revue Theatre, where he sang in the operettas Alhambritta, Lăsați-mă să cânt, and Contesa Maritza.

In 1931, he toured Romania with Ion Manolescu, an actor at the National Theatre Bucharest. That year he signed an exclusive contract with the London-based RCA Records. By 1936, his repertoire included some 300 songs of various genres, both Romanian and foreign; he helped popularize the tango in his native land. In 1932 he went to Berlin, where he recorded discs with famous orchestras such as Hönigsberg and James Kok, and took bel canto lessons with Professor Korst. In 1943 he played the part of the Armenian in A Stormy Night, a film adaptation of the eponymous play by Ion Luca Caragiale, directed by Jean Georgescu.

With the end of World War II, Moscopol's fortunes changed, as his political opinions stood in marked contrast to those of the Romanian Communist Party then gaining ascendancy. Not wishing to serve the régime, he managed to flee to the United States in 1945. Arriving in New York City, he worked as a hotel porter, investing the money he earned into a small musical ensemble. With this group he continued playing the songs that brought him renown in 1930s Bucharest, as well as anti-communist and exile-themed music. He played an active role in the Saint Dumitru Romanian Orthodox parish. He died in exile in 1980, never having married.

In the 1970s, Moscopol recorded a series of songs with the help of Aristide Buhoiu, director of the newspaper Universul. These were released in Bucharest in 1993. Songs of his include "Vrei să ne-ntâlnim sâmbătă seara?", "Mână, birjar", and "Tot ce-i românesc nu piere", as well as "Dă-mi gurița s-o sărut".

Due to his vehement opposition to the Russification policies put in effect during the Soviet occupation of Romania, the Communist regime tried to erase Moscopol from the national memory by marginalizing him. Around 2005, director Ștefan Gladin met with great difficulties when he sought information about Moscopol for a biographical film; few archival documents about him remained.
