= A. T. Laurian National College =

Public school in Botoșani County, Romania

- Colegiul Național "A. T. Laurian"
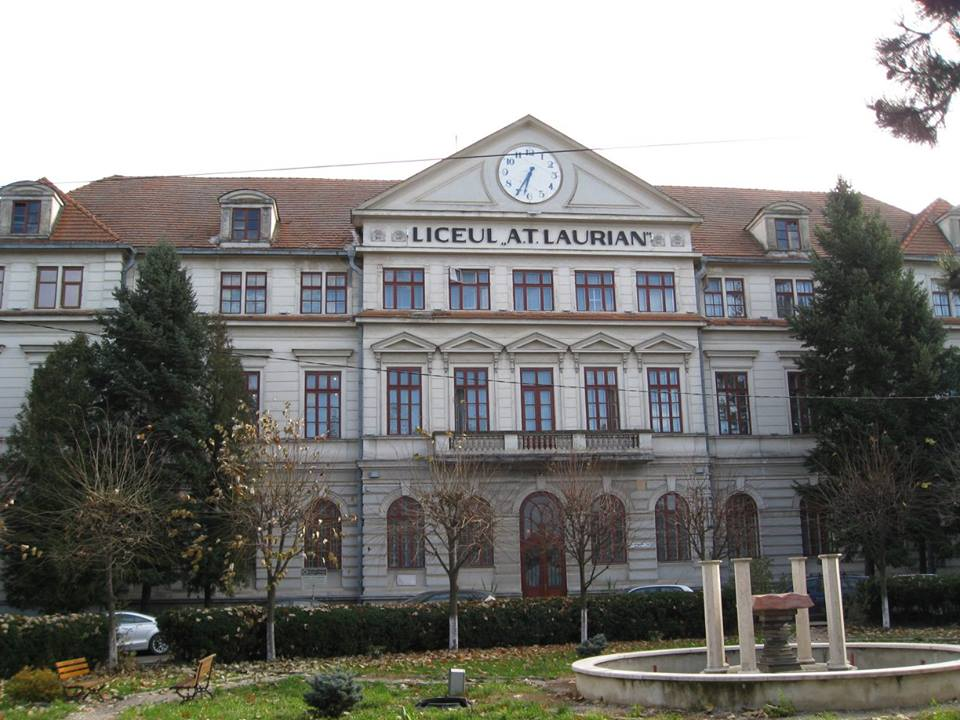

Location
- Strada Nicolae Iorga, Nr. 19; Botoșani, Botoșani County; Romania; 47.7386°N 26.6647°E

Information
- Type: Public
- Established: 1859; 167 years ago
- Director: Ioan Onofrei
- Language: Romanian
- Website: laurian.ro

A. T. Laurian National College (Romanian: Colegiul Național "A. T. Laurian", CNATL, or simply known as Laurian locally) is a public day high school in Botoșani, Romania, located at 19 Nicolae Iorga Street. It is the most prestigious educational institution in Botosani County offering several secondary education programs in STEM and liberal arts fields, such as Computer science (Matematica-Informatica), Natural Science (Stiinte ale Naturii), Social Science (Stiinte Sociale), and Philology (Filologie). It is ranked No. 2 county-wide and No. 139 nationwide according to BacPlus, with a 96.9% Baccalaureate graduation rate in 2024.

== History ==
The school was founded as a gymnasium in 1859. When classes began that September, there were two teachers handling all subjects, twelve pupils, four fir benches, a table, an elm chair and a blackboard. In January 1868, two upper-level grades were added, and in the ensuing years, the school became a center of local cultural activity. A new building was inaugurated in 1885, at which point the school was named after August Treboniu Laurian and elevated to a high school.

World War I seriously impacted school life; between 1917 and 1922, teaching took place in improvised locations and finally in the former building of another school. The old building was repaired in 1922, and the institution flourished during the interwar period. In the 1927–1928 school year, there were 521 pupils, of whom 69% were Christian and 31% Jewish. In 1948, the new communist regime changed the institution's name to Secondary School No. 1; Laurian was restored in 1960. During the 1960s and '70s, the school saw the establishment of a periodical, a museum and annual reunions, as well as material improvements. In 1999, a decade after the Romanian Revolution, it was granted the title of national college.

The school building is listed as a historic monument by Romania's Ministry of Culture and Religious Affairs.

== Alumni ==
- From the 1880s until World War I
  - Gheorghe Avramescu
  - Mihai Ciucă
  - Dumitru Corbea
  - Ludovic Dauș
  - Artur Enășescu
  - Constantin Gane
  - Rodrig Goliescu
  - Iacob Iacobovici
  - Nicolae Iorga
  - Barbu Lăzăreanu
  - Ioan Missir
  - Octav Onicescu
  - Elie Radu
  - Ion Th. Simionescu
- After World War I
  - Cristian Bădiliță
  - Lucien Goldmann
  - Alexandru Graur

== Teachers ==
- Alexandru Lambrior
- Marcel Olinescu
