= Vasile Alecsandri National College (Galați) =

- Colegiul Național "Vasile Alecsandri"
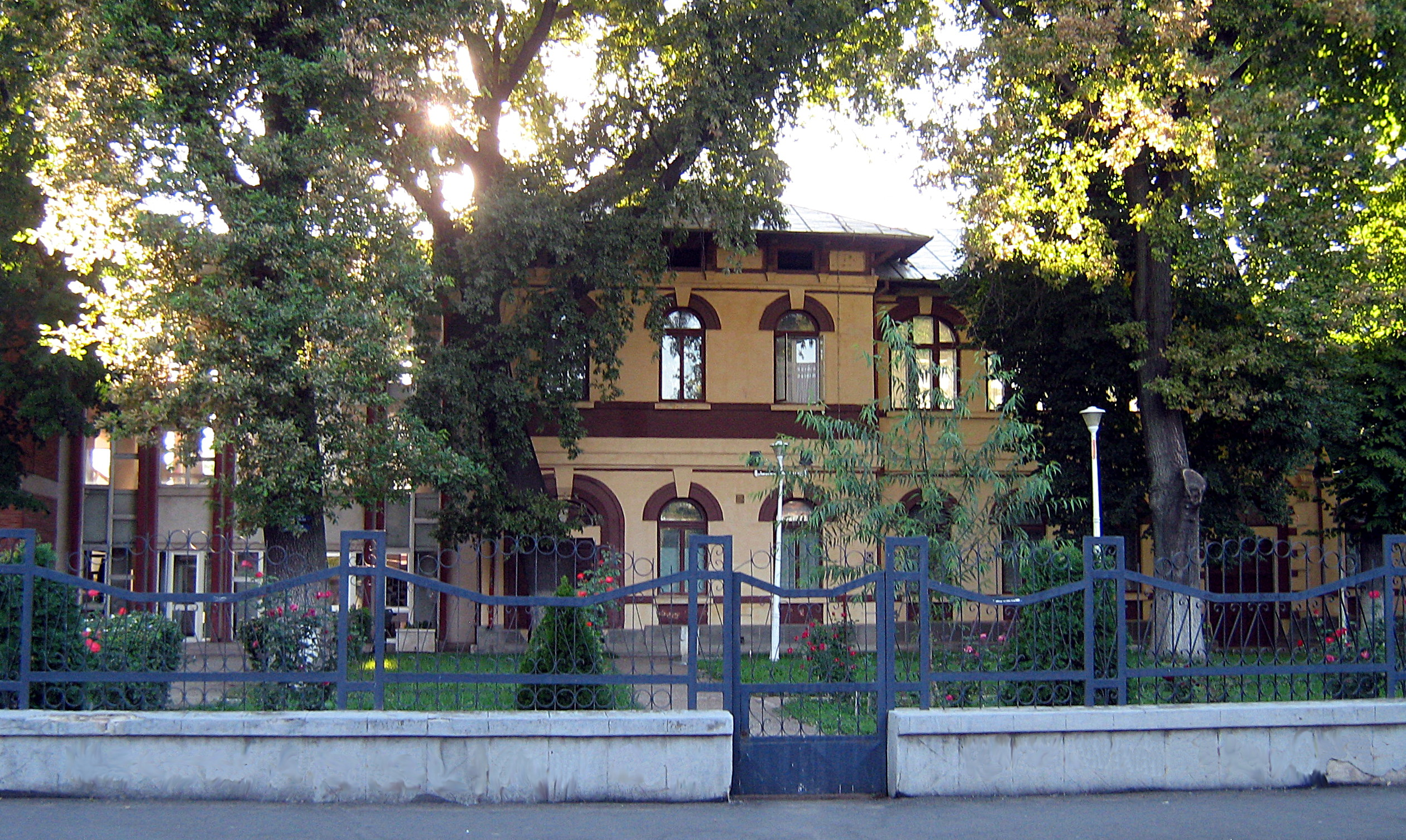

Location
- Strada Nicolae Bălcescu, Nr. 41; Galați, Galați County; Romania
- Coordinates: 45.4408°N 28.0513°E

Information
- Funding type: Public
- Established: 1867; 159 years ago
- Status: Open
- Category: Middle School and High School
- Principal: Romeo Zamfir
- Grades: 5 to 12
- Gender: coeducation
- Age range: 11–19
- Language: Romanian
- Hours in school day: 5–7
- Campus type: Urban
- Website: cnva.eu

Vasile Alecsandri National College (Romanian: Colegiul Național "Vasile Alecsandri") is a public day high school in Galați, Romania, located at 41 Nicolae Bălcescu Street.

== History ==
In the mid-1860s, amidst increased economic development, the lack of a gymnasium in Galați became apparent. Thus, after repeated petitions, in August 1867 the Education Ministry authorized the establishment of a school with a single class. Three months later, the school opened its doors in a public ceremony; the principal, from Transylvania, had two teachers working under him. During its first twenty years, twenty-eight teachers worked at the gymnasium, and over 1500 pupils studied there, most prominently Eremia Grigorescu (1874–1878). In 1887, the institution was declared a high school, with seven grades. The school building was completed in 1890; two years later, it was named after the poet Vasile Alecsandri. Also in 1890, academic V. A. Urechia (who represented the Galați area in the Senate) donated his personal library to the school. Beginning in 1913 and upon the initiative of principal Ion Tohăneanu, the school hosted a "people's university" that involved political, cultural, scientific and literary figures delivering lectures open to the public.

During World War I, the school building was evacuated for use as a hospital, faculty were sent to the front and the number of students diminished. In the early 1920s, the school hosted literary circles and the editing staff of modernist cultural, artistic and literary magazines. Faculty members were involved in organizing these activities, while the publications were largely written by students, including future art critic Nicolae Argintescu-Amza. In 1926, a dormitory for rural pupils was completed under the initiative of Tohăneanu, whose other projects included a new classroom wing, an amphitheater and sport facilities for gymnastics, swimming and shooting. Starting in 1923, he organized a monthlong summer camp near Cheia Monastery, an initiative that continued throughout the interwar period.

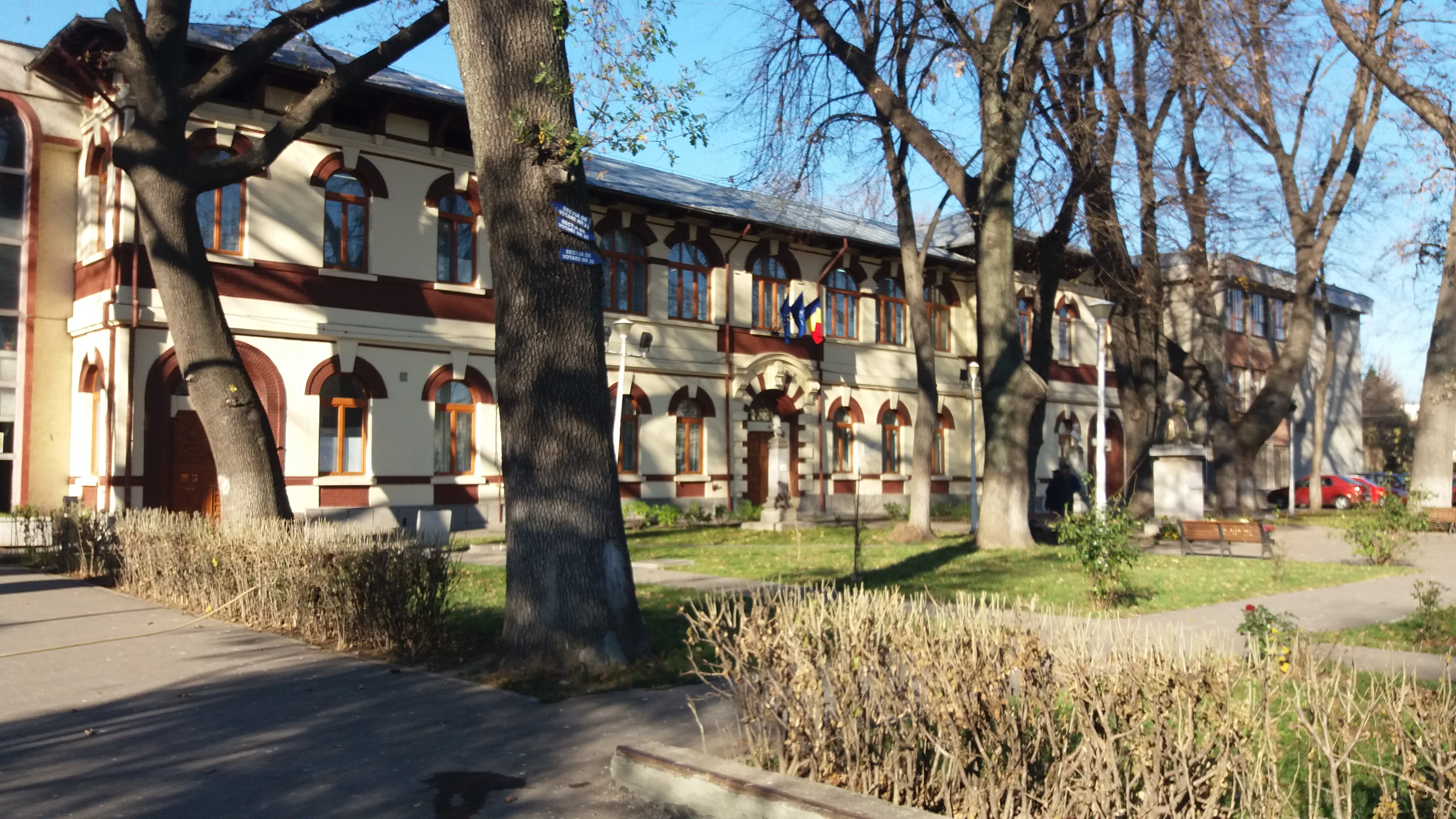
The main building

In World War II, the school headquarters again functioned as a hospital and teachers were sent to fight; many pupils took refuge in surrounding villages, while relatively few continued their studies. The institution was downgraded to a theoretical high school in 1944, after King Michael's Coup. In 1948, following the establishment of a communist regime, it was renamed the Co-educational Theoretical Middle School. In 1965, the Vasile Alecsandri name was restored. Around this time, the school became renowned for its mathematics program, and its students became passionate participants in national olympiads, with some of them going on to Balkan and Europe-wide competitions.

The school building is listed as a historic monument by Romania's Ministry of Culture and Religious Affairs.

== Alumni ==
- Eugen Aburel
- Nineta Barbulescu
- Cristian Calude
- Nicolae Caranfil
- Nicolae Dabija
- Ion Dongorozi
- Ionel Fernic
- Virgil Madgearu
- Gheorghe Ursu
- I. Valerian
- Gheorghe Zane
