= Cristian Vasile =

Romanian singer

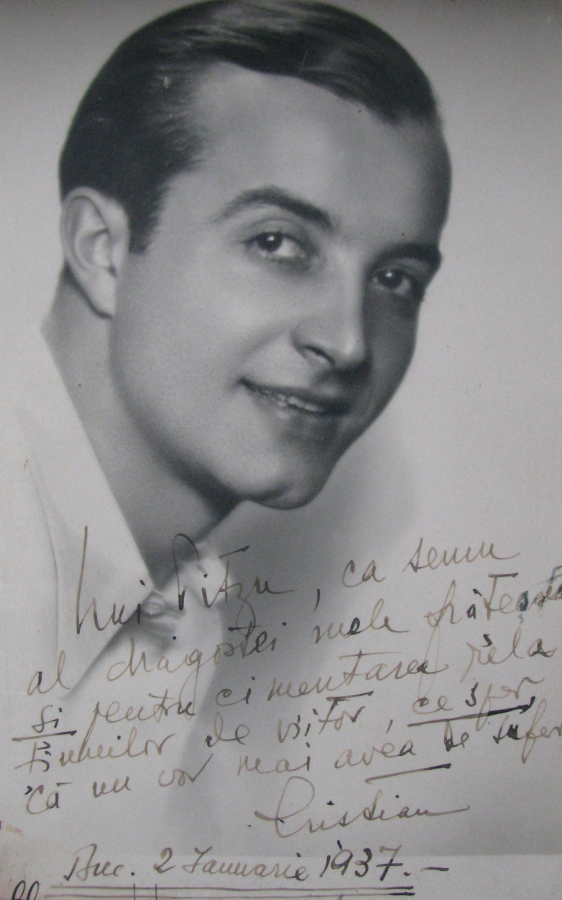
Photo of Vasile with autograph signed 1937

Cristian Vasile (May 8, 1908 – June 15, 1974) was a Romanian tango-romance (Romanță) singer between 1928 and 1949, famous for songs such as "Zaraza", "Aprinde o țigară", "Ce să-ți mai scriu", "Pentru tine am făcut nebunii", and "Nunuțo".

He was born in Brăila, the son of Virginia and Gheorghe Vasile, a judge. He went to school in Viziru and Brăila and attended the Nicolae Bălcescu High School in his native city, after which he studied at the Music and Declamation Conservatory in Bucharest.

His greatest success, the song "Zaraza", that was said to refer to a Roma woman he was in love with at that time, was in fact an adapted version of a Uruguayan tango written in 1929 by Benjamín Alfonso Tagle Lara. A popular rumour surrounding the song says that Vasile's lover was murdered by a rival singer, Zavaidoc, and her death caused Vasile to never sing again. Vasile did in fact abruptly stop his singing career, but a more credible explanation is that he lost his voice due to cancer. Although he was supposedly at odds with Zavaidoc, there is no proof that such a rivalry existed beyond mere rumours. He died in 1974 in Sibiu.
