= Constantin Popovici (scholar) =

Constantin Fedorovici Popovici (Ukrainian: Костянтин Федорович Попович, romanized: Kostiantyn Fedorovych Popovych; 1924–2010) was a Ukrainian Moldovan (Romanian) literary critic, folklorist, writer, publicist, Doctor of Philology (1974), Professor (1988), Academician of the Academy of Sciences of Moldova (1995), member of the Writers' Unions of Ukraine and Moldova, and Honored Scientist of Moldova (1984).
