= Artur Enășescu =

Romanian poet (1889–1942)

Artur Enășescu (pen name of Artur A. Enăcescu; January 19 (or 12), 1889 – December 4, 1942) was a Romanian poet.

Born in Botoșani, his parents were Alexandru Enăcescu, a Post, Telegraph, Telephone (PTT) employee, and his wife Olga (née Nacu). He began school in his native town in 1896 and entered A. T. Laurian High School, which he attended from 1900 to 1903. He then transferred to the National College, where he studied from 1904 to 1905, but only obtained a degree at Botoșani in 1913 or 1914. For a time, it was believed that he audited university courses in Paris in 1911 and 1912, but he in fact worked as a clerk in Botoșani during this period, except for a brief stay in Paris in the summer of 1912. His first published work was "Amor", a sonnet that appeared in Convorbiri critice in 1910. Other magazines that featured his verses include Flacăra, Moldova, Rampa, Epoca, Convorbiri literare, Vremuri nouă, Solia, Îndrumarea, Junimea Moldovei de Nord, Luceafărul, Cuvântul liber, Universul liber, Familia, Propilee literare and Ideea literară. Drafted into the Romanian Army when his country entered World War I in 1916, Enășescu saw action at Oituz and Măgura Cașinului. He was an editor for the Botoșani-based Îndrumarea in 1918 and for the Bucharest Luceafărul in 1919–1920. Due to an illness, he stayed in a sanatorium at Sibiu from 1920 to 1922. His only book published during his lifetime was the 1920 Pe gânduri, which appeared thanks to the effort of his friends. From 1928, the disease of his nervous system became irreversible. In the 1930s, with his lost mind, he was a vagabond, sleeping in passageways or under the staircase of the Ferdinand Hotel. He cut a tragic and colorful figure in the landscape of downtown Bucharest, as recorded by artists Ion Sava and Aurel Jiquidi.

== Bibliography ==
- Pe gânduri, Bucharest, 1920
- Revolta zeului, Bucharest, 1946
- Poezii, Bucharest, 1968
