= Nineta Barbulescu =

Romanian diplomat (born 1968)

Her Excellency Nineta Bărbulescu
- Barbulescu in 2015

Romania Ambassador to Malaysia & Brunei Darussalam
- Incumbent
- Assumed office January 22, 2021
- President: Klaus Iohannis

Romania Ambassador to Australia
- In office August 31, 2013 – December 12, 2020
- President: Traian Basescu
- Preceded by: Mihai Stuparu
- Succeeded by: Radu Gabriel Safta

Director General for Export Controls Department (MFA)
- In office January 13, 2013 – October 18, 2013

Director of OSCE Asymmetrical Risks and Non-Proliferation Directorate (MFA)
- In office 2007–2013

Director for Council of Europe and Human Rights (MFA)
- In office 2010–2012

Director of OSCE Asymmetrical Risks and Non-Proliferation Directorate (MFA)
- In office 2005–2007

Personal details
- Born: Nineta Dragomir; 23 February 1968 (age 58) Galați, Romania
- Spouse: Dan Bărbulescu (m. 1992)
- Children: 4
- Education: Vasile Alecsandri National College (Galați)
- Alma mater: University of Bucharest
- Profession: Diplomat
- Awards: National Order of Merit (Romania)
- Website: facebook.com/nina.barbu.7

Nineta Bărbulescu (born 23 February 1968) is a Romanian career diplomat, and current Ambassador of Romania to Malaysia and (non-resident) Brunei. She served as the Romanian Ambassador to Australia from August 2013 until December 2020. During these 7 years, she was also accredited non-resident Ambassador to New Zealand (2015–2020), Fiji (2018–2020), Independent State of Samoa (2018–2020), Solomon Islands (2018–2020), Vanuatu (2018–2020), Kiribati (2018–2020), Tuvalu (2019–2020), and Nauru (2019–2020).

== Early years ==
Nineta Dragomir was born in 1968 in Galați, a port city on the Danube, and attended the Vasile Alecsandri National College. In 1992, she earned a Master in International Public Law magna cum laude from the University of Bucharest. She was a lecturer and visiting professor for public international law at the following Romanian universities: University of Bucharest (Law Faculty), Dimitrie Cantemir Christian University, Titu Maiorescu University, and the Nicolae Titulescu Law Institute.

In 1999, together with Aurel Preda Mătăsaru, a fellow Romanian diplomat, she published The International Court of Justice and the Law of the Sea. She also published several studies and publications dedicated to new developments in the fields of human rights (e.g., European citizenship), export controls, law of the sea, International Criminal Court, International Tribunal for Rwanda, and International Court of Justice jurisprudence.

== Diplomatic career ==
=== Early Career (1992–2012) ===
Bărbulescu started her career in 1992, at the Ministry of Foreign Affairs (former Euro Atlantic Centre) in Bucharest. A year later, she was appointed Chief of Cabinet at the Office of the Chamber of Deputies Speaker, a position held until 1997. Between 1997 and 1999 respectively, she served as First Secretary of the Public International Law Directorate within the Ministry of Foreign Affairs. During the same period, she served as senior expert at the NATO and Non-Proliferation Directorate within the Ministry of Foreign Affairs.

In 2000, she was appointed deputy director for NATO and Strategic Issues Department and the MFA representative to the Inter-Agency Council for Arms and Dual Use Export Controls.

Between 2001 and 2005, Bărbulescu was appointed State Secretary, President of the National Agency for Arms Export Controls (formerly ANCEX) and Head of the National Authority for the Chemical Weapons Convention implementation in Romania.

In 2002, the President of Romania awarded Bărbulescu the National Order of Merit for her work towards the national foreign policy, involving NATO and the Treaty on the Non-Proliferation of Nuclear Weapons Directorate in MFA.

In 2010, Bărbulescu was awarded the diplomatic attaché Minister Plenipotentiary for her work at the Ministry of Foreign Affairs. Following years (2011–2012), Nineta was Chair of the Hague Code of Conduct against Ballistic Missile Proliferation, Vienna. In 2012, she also was Romanian Sous-Sherpa at the Seoul Nuclear Security Summit.

Over the period of 2007–2013, she served as Director for OSCE, Asymmetrical Risks, Non Proliferation, and the Combating Terrorism Directorate within the Ministry of Foreign Affairs. Cumulative (2010–2012), she also served as Director for Human Rights and the Council of Europe Directorate. Bărbulescu managed a range of security related issues such as non-proliferation, disarmament, counter-proliferation, conventional arms (including small arms, light weapons (SALW) and ammunition), arms control (CFE, Open Sky, Vienna Document 1999), policies in export controls, human rights and rights of persons belonging to minorities, OSCE, and Council of Europe.

Between 2010 and 2014, she also served as Member, Vice-chair, and Chair of the Confidentiality Commission of the Organisation for the Prohibition of Chemical Weapons. She was re-elected for her third consecutive term by the Conference of States Parties (CSP) to the Chemical Weapons Convention as Member of the OPCW Confidentiality Commission. During HE Bărbulescu's tenure as official of OPCW, the 2013 Nobel Prize was awarded to the Organisation for the Prohibition of Chemical Weapons in The Hague.

After being appointed Director General for Export Controls in January 2013 (within the Ministry of Foreign Affairs), she initiated a package of amendments to the Romanian Arms Export Controls Law (currently in force).

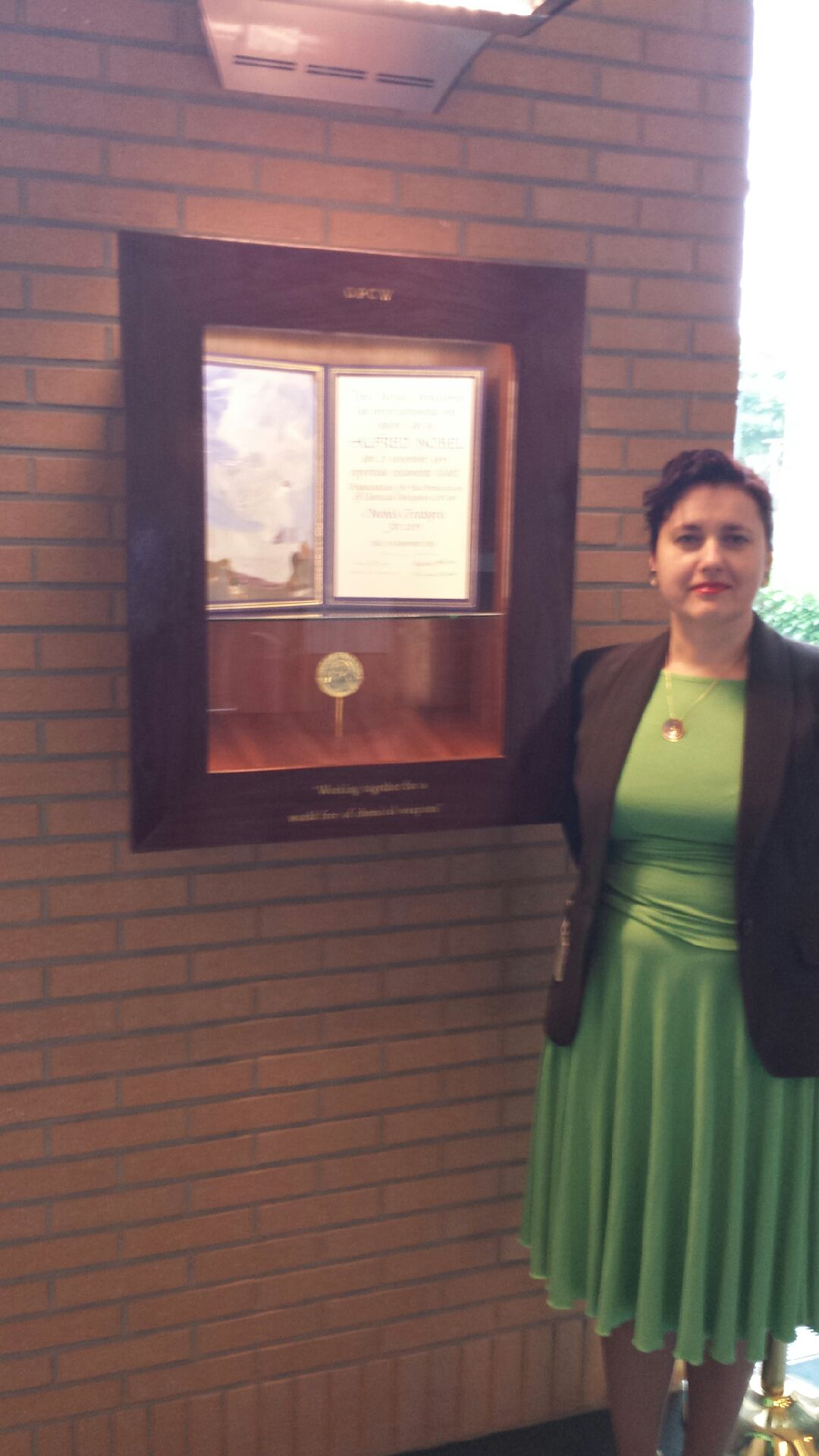
May 2014, HE Nineta Bărbulescu, Ambassador of Romania to Australia in front of the 2013 Nobel Prize awarded to the Organisation for the Prohibition of Chemical Weapons in the Hague, during her tenure as Board Member of OPCW Confidentiality Commission (Netherlands)

Bărbulescu also held the following positions in 2013 prior to becoming Ambassador;

- In March 2013, the vice-president of the Final United Nations Diplomatic Conference for adopting an Arms Trade Treaty (ATT) in New York.
- In September 2013, Head of the Multinational delegation for the Australia Group Outreach mission in Republic of Moldova.

=== Romanian Ambassador to Australia, New Zealand, Fiji, Kiribati, Independent State of Samoa, Vanuatu, Solomon Islands, Tuvalu and Nauru (2013–2020) ===
Bărbulescu was appointed Ambassador to Australia in mid-2013 by then-President Traian Băsescu. Later in April 2015, she became non-resident ambassador to New Zealand.

In 2016, Romanian exports to Australia increased 86% to USD$200 Million. In 2017, Bărbulescu opened the first Romanian Honorary Consulates in Perth, Western Australia, Adelaide, and South Australia. In June 2018, a consular bureau was established (of the Embassy of Romania) in Melbourne, Victoria, providing for the thousands of those of Romanian origins living in Victoria, Western Australia, South Australia, and Tasmania. A great accomplishment was HE's successful lobbying to secure the signing of the contract to build the Australian state-of-the-art icebreaker, made in Romania, before the 2016 Australian federal elections. Another notable milestone was the AUD 1 billion investment in Romania by Macquarie Asset Management in 2020 through the acquisition of one of the European Union's largest onshore wind farms, an outcome that followed five years of engagement initiated by H.E. Ambassador Bărbulescu in support of the project.

Bărbulescu is the first Romanian Ambassador appointed to Pacific islands countries (7). In July 2018, she presented her credentials in Solomon Islands and Republic of Kiribati, and established bilateral diplomatic relations with Tarawa.

Between January–March 2019, she presented her credentials in Vanuatu, Samoa, and Fiji. In December 2019, Ambassador Nineta Bărbulescu became Dean of the Diplomatic Corp in the Commonwealth of Australia. In January 2020, Ambassador Nineta Bărbulescu presented her letter of credence to Teniku Talesi, General Governor of Tuvalu, and in March 2020, she presented her letter of credence to Lionel Aingimea, President of the Republic of Nauru.

Cultural Diplomacy in Australia and the Pacific

As Dean of the Diplomatic Corps, H.E. Ambassador Nineta Bărbulescu had the honour of welcoming Their Excellencies the Governor-General of Australia, General (Retd) David Hurley, and Mrs Linda Hurley to the Romanian Embassy to visit the Pacifica Romania exhibition.

The Pacifica Romania exhibition at the Embassy of Romania was also honoured by the visit of the Honourable Marise Payne, Minister for Foreign Affairs of Australia, on the occasion of Romanian Diplomacy Day, together with members of the Women Heads of Diplomatic Missions in Australia (WOHOMA).

Other notable cultural engagements included the presentation of Constantin Brâncuși works at the National Gallery of Australia, recognised among the most significant and valuable pieces in the Gallery’s collection, as well as the inclusion of the Portrait of Queen Marie of Romania in the Cartier Exhibition in Canberra. On the occasion of the 50th anniversary of diplomatic relations between Romania and Australia, a separate programme featured the presentation of the Tyler Collection, accompanied by a statement by H.E. Ambassador Nineta Bărbulescu marking this milestone in bilateral relations.

=== Romanian Ambassador to Malaysia and Brunei (2021–present) ===
Bărbulescu was appointed Ambassador to Malaysia on January 22, 2021, by President Klaus Iohannis. She was appointed as Ambassador to Brunei on March 2, 2021. Mrs. Bărbulescu presented her credentials to the King of Malaysia Al-Sultan Abdullah Ri’ayatuddin Al-Mustafa Billah Shah on November 10, 2021.

She signed two judicial treaties between Romania and Malaysia on December 6, 2021, highlighting that "These two new bilateral treaties are contributions to multilateralism and cooperation," and adding "[the treaties] strengthen the future resilience of our respective countries by more effective cooperation in the suppression of crime, these treaties might also serve as an inspiration and motivation for our regional neighbours to broaden their legal avenues with countries from afar.".

Through sustained engagement with chambers of commerce and industry, MATRADE, and maritime authorities, she also contributed to the expansion of bilateral trade, which more than doubled during her mandate. In the field of sustainability, she promoted the Malaysia HydroBattery for ASEAN project under the Green Initiative Team Europe framework in partnership with ASEAN through a series of conferences held in Sabah, Sarawak, and Peninsular Malaysia.

The Parliament of Malaysia hosted a commemorative cultural event marking the 55th anniversary of diplomatic relations between Malaysia and Romania. The event was officially inaugurated by the Speaker of the Dewan Rakyat, YB Tan Sri Dato' (Dr.) Johari bin Abdul, and featured the launch of the "55 Years of Bilateral Diplomatic Relations Between Malaysia and Romania Art Exhibition", showcasing paintings and diorama artworks by Malaysian and Romanian artists. Supported by the Romanian diaspora in Malaysia, the programme also included a Kebaya exhibition organised in collaboration with the Department of National Heritage, highlighting Malaysia's nomination of the Kebaya for inscription on UNESCO's Representative List of the Intangible Cultural Heritage of Humanity.

== Personal life ==
Nineta Bărbulescu is married to Dan Bărbulescu since 1992. They have 4 sons, Tudor, Victor, Cristian, David and one granddaughter, Cheeva Ioana. Bărbulescu speaks Romanian, English, and French.

Bărbulescu and her family have been residing in Malaysia since March 2021.

== Honours ==
- Romania:
  - National Order of Merit
- Romania:
  - Romanian Orthodox Church Order of Merit

== Interviews ==
- Romanian ambassador Nineta Barbulescu discusses investment cooperation with Sarawak
- Romanian ambassador visits Penang to collaborate on Tourism
- Romania eyes new cooperation projects with Malaysia
- Mrs Barbulescu signs two Judicial treaties that bolster Romania-Malaysian ties in late 2021
- 2019 Interview with Nineta Barbulescu (in Romanian)
- 2019 Interview with Nineta Barbulescu on the 2019 EU Parliamentary elections and the referendum on justice in Romania (in Romanian)
- Tyler Collection strengthens ties between Tasmania and Romania, ABC News July 2019
- 2018 Interview with Nineta Barbulescu on the New Consular Bureau in Melbourne (in Romanian)
- 2018 Interview (in Romanian)
- Official Statement of HE Nineta Bărbulescu on the National Day of Romania Reception in 2017
- 2015 Interview with Nineta Barbulescu
- Interview with Nineta Barbulescu on the Transylvania in South-West of Tasmania, Australia (in Romanian)

Diplomatic posts
Preceded by	Romanian Ambassador to Malaysia and Brunei; 2021–present	Succeeded by
Preceded by Mihai Stuparu	Romanian Ambassador to Australia; 2013–2020	Succeeded by Radu Gabriel Safta
Preceded by First appointment	(Non-Resident) Romanian Ambassador to New Zealand, Fiji, Independent State of Samoa, Kiribati, Vanuatu, Solomon Islands & Tuvalu; 2015–2020	Succeeded by -
