= Fibrous tissue neoplasm =

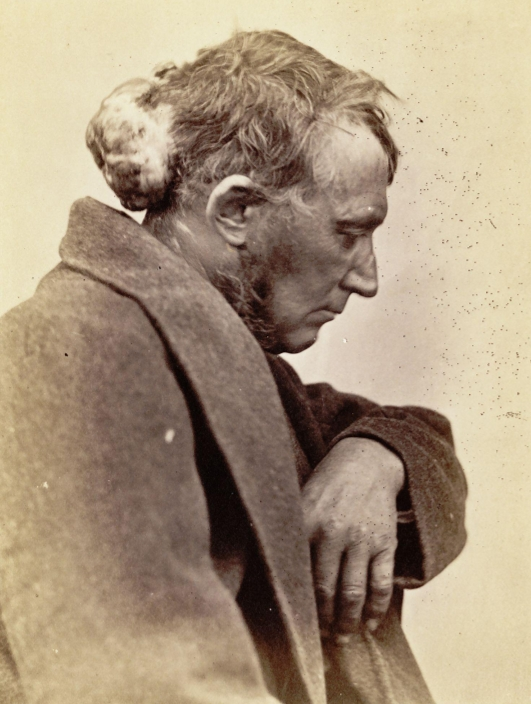
- Fibrous tissue neoplasm, 1871
- Specialty: Oncology

A fibrous tissue neoplasm is a tumor derived primarily from Fibrous connective tissue.

An example is fibroma.

== See also ==
- Fibroepithelial neoplasms
