= Exeresis =

Surgical procedure

Exeresis may refer to the surgical removal of any part or organ, roughly synonymous to excision. However, it may specifically refer to clearing the uterus of its contents after a miscarriage, such as vacuum aspiration.
