= Ernest Juvara =

Romanian physician

- Born: May 5, 1870; Bârlad, Vaslui County, Principality of Romania
- Died: May 5, 1933 (aged 63); Bucharest, Kingdom of Romania
- Education: University of Paris
- Awards: Order of the Star of Romania, Knight rank
- Scientific career
- Fields: Medicine
- Workplaces: Carol Davila University of Medicine and Pharmacy
- Doctoral students: Nicolae Hortolomei

Ernest Juvara (May 5, 1870 – May 5, 1933) was a Romanian physician, innovative in surgical and instrumental techniques. He was a professor at the Faculty of Medicine of the University of Bucharest, with contributions in the field of bone prostheses, intestinal anastomoses, and spinal anesthesia.

He was born in Bârlad, Vaslui County, the son of Iorgu Juvara and Maria Docan. He went to Saint Sava High School in Bucharest, after which he studied at the Faculty of Medicine of the University of Paris from 1888 to 1895. He was awarded the Order of the Star of Romania, Knight rank. He died at his home in Bucharest, aged 63, due to an electrical injury from an appliance. A street next to the Bucharest Botanical Garden is named after him.

== Publications ==
- Juvara, Ernest, Dr. (1895), Anatomie de la région ptérygo-maxillaire (in French), L. Bataille, OCLC 457779820
- Juvara, Ernest (1899), Leitfaden für die chirurgische Anatomie (in German), Hirschwald, ISBN 9783743449855, OCLC 1104865711
