= Cluj University Press =

Academic publisher

- Parent company: Babeș-Bolyai University
- Status: Active
- Founded: 1993
- Country of origin: Romania
- Headquarters location: Cluj-Napoca
- Distribution: Worldwide
- Publication types: Academic publishing
- Official website: www.editura.ubbcluj.ro

Cluj University Press (Romanian: Presa Universitară Clujeană) is the publishing house of Babeș-Bolyai University in Cluj-Napoca, Romania. It has no legal personality and operates self-financing. It was founded in 1993.

Cluj University Press has published and printed specialized papers in the fields of humanities, technical studies, courses and fundamental writings in the fields of linguistics, philology, economics, law, and philosophy. Between 1997 and 2006, the Press published over 1,200 titles.

Cluj University Press regularly participates in National Book Salon events held in Cluj-Napoca, as well as at the National Book Fair in Alba Iulia, the annual Gaudeamus book fairs, the traditional Universitaria offers, and other such events.
