= Zavaidoc =

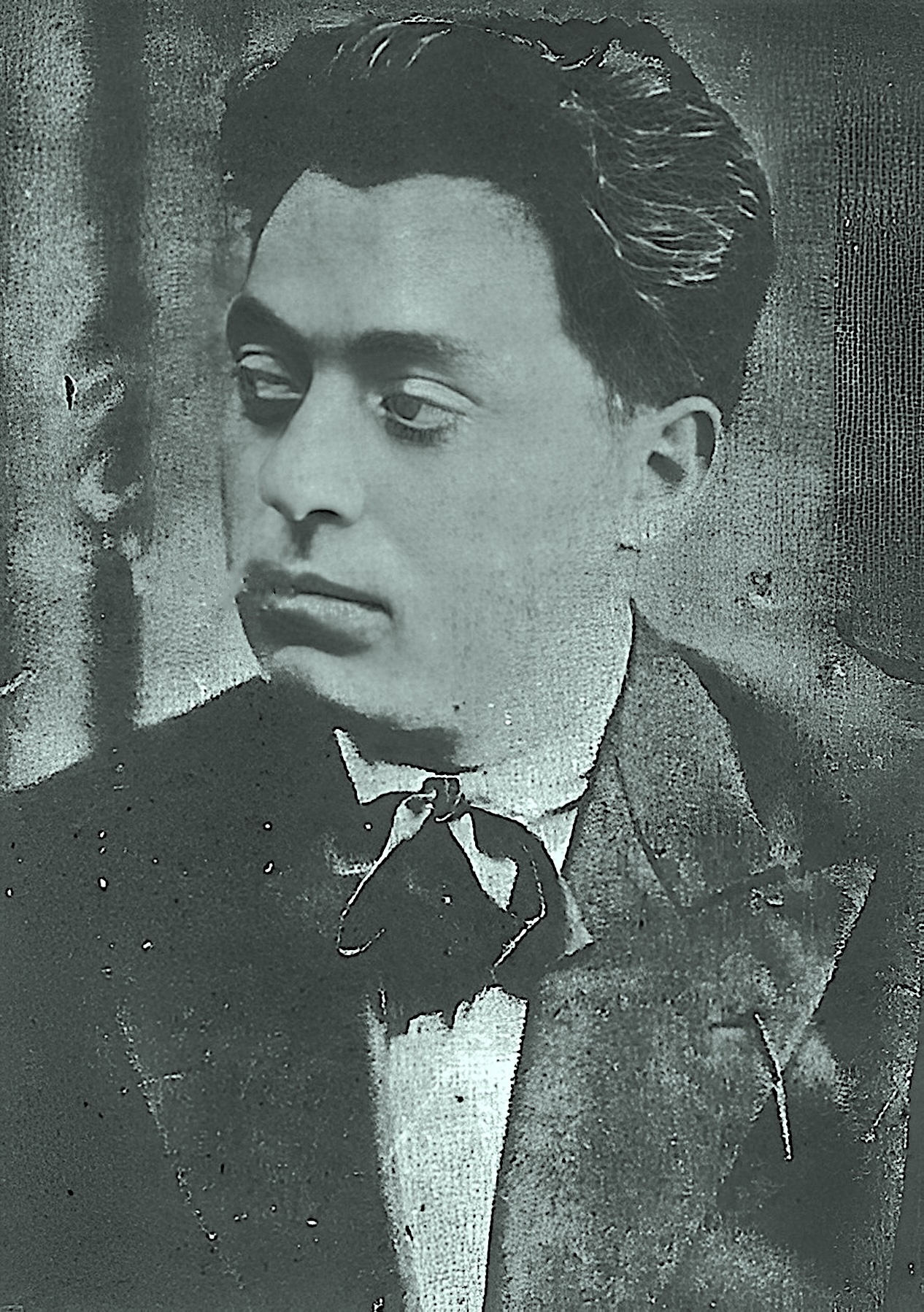

Marin Teodorescu (Romanian pronunciation: [maˈrin te.odoˈresku]; March 8, 1896 – January 13, 1945), known as Zavaidoc ([zavajˈdok]), was a Romanian singer, the country's best known lăutar in the interwar period.

Born in Pitești into a family of lăutari, he made his way to Bucharest as a youth, together with his taraf partner. He released his first disc with Columbia Records in 1925, meeting with instant success. He died in Bucharest two decades later and was buried at Cernica.

== Early life and identity ==
Teodorescu adopted the stage name Zavaidoc early in his career. In some early documents and private correspondence, he also signed himself Theodorescu. As a young man, he moved to Bucharest, where he began performing together with his taraf, gradually building a reputation in the city’s musical circles.

== Career ==
Zavaidoc rose to prominence before the widespread use of microphones and radio broadcasting, relying on live performance and direct contact with audiences. He sang in a wide range of venues, from popular urban gardens and peripheral neighborhoods to luxury gardens frequented by the Bucharest elite, as well as on the operatic stage, an unusual trajectory for a lăutar at the time.

He is often credited with helping shape modern urban Romanian music, blending traditional folk material with new urban sensibilities. Zavaidoc actively collected and reworked folk songs, adapting them for city audiences and contributing to the emergence of a distinct urban repertoire during the interwar years.

Following the establishment of commercial recording studios, Zavaidoc became the best-selling Romanian singer of the interwar period. His records, released primarily by Columbia Records beginning in 1925, enjoyed remarkable commercial success and played a major role in disseminating his music nationally.

== Public image and later life ==
At the height of his fame, Zavaidoc was a cultural icon of Bucharest, frequently compared in the contemporary press to international film stars—most notably to Rudolf Valentino—for his expressive histrionics and charismatic stage presence, and described as a defining figure of urban popular culture. Despite his immense popularity, his later life was marked by financial hardship. The economic instability of the period, compounded by the bankruptcy of financial institutions and the destruction of his home during wartime bombardments, left him impoverished.

Zavaidoc’s later years were marked by severe hardship. During the 1944 Allied bombing of Bucharest, his home was destroyed and he and his family were forced to seek refuge in Caracal, and later in Roșiorii de Vede and other towns. After the war, he lived without a permanent residence and suffered personal losses, including the death of his sister Zoia. In his final years, he became blind as a result of extremely high blood pressure. He spent his last days in Filantropia Hospital in Bucharest and died on 13 January 1945—coincidentally the same day as his daughter Niculina. He was buried at Cernica Monastery Cemetery.<ref>{{cite web |last=Bouleanu |first=Elisabeth |title=Drama marelui lăutar Zavaidoc. Cum a murit muzicianul sărac și orb, după ce a cunoscut cele mai înalte culmi ale gloriei |url=https://historia.ro/sectiune/portret/drama-marelui-lautar-zavaidoc-cum-a-murit-574762.html |website=Historia.ro |access-date=2026-01-21}}</ref>

== Legacy ==
Zavaidoc remains a seminal figure in Romanian musical history, associated with the transition from traditional lăutar performance to modern urban popular music. His recordings continue to be regarded as authentic documents of interwar Romanian culture.

In literature, a single novel is dedicated exclusively to his life and era: Zavaidoc in the Year of Love (Romanian: Zavaidoc în anul iubirii), published in 2023 by Romanian novelist Doina Ruști. The novel reconstructs Bucharest in the 1920s and explores Zavaidoc’s cultural impact through a fictionalized narrative.

== Bibliografie ==
Viorel Cosma - Lăutarii de ieri și de azi, ed. Muzicală a Uniunii Compozitorilor, 1976

Jean Dumitrașcu - Năbădăioasă viață a lui Zavaidoc, Centrul Cultural Pitești, 2014
