= James Kok =

Romanian bandleader

Arthur James Kok (January 24, 1902, Czernowitz - October 18, 1976, Berlin) was a Romanian bandleader, violinist, and arranger. He led dance bands that played light music and jazz.

Kok learned to play music from his father, a violinist. He also could play saxophone, clarinet, and piano. Later in life, he alleged that he had been raised in the US, but he was born in what is now Ukraine. At the time, the area was in Austria-Hungary's Duchy of Bukovina, passing to the Kingdom of Romania for the interwar period. He attended the Prague Conservatory and then put a band together in Berlin, which remained active through 1933, toured throughout germanophone Europe, and recorded for Deutsche Grammophon. He left Germany under duress in 1935 and led a new ensemble in Romania, which toured Switzerland in 1938 and Holland in 1939, shortly before the outbreak of war. In 1939 he relocated to Switzerland, where he lived until the late 1950s; he then lived in the United States for much of the 1960s. In 1969 he moved back to Berlin, where he would live out the rest of his life.
