= Minovici =

Minovici is a Romanian surname. Notable people with the surname include:

- Mina Minovici (1857–1933), Romanian forensic scientist
- Nicolae Minovici (1868–1941), Romanian criminologist and forensic scientist
- Ștefan Minovici (1867–1935), Romanian chemist
