= Eugen Schileru =

Romanian art, film and literary critic, essayist and translator (1916–1968)

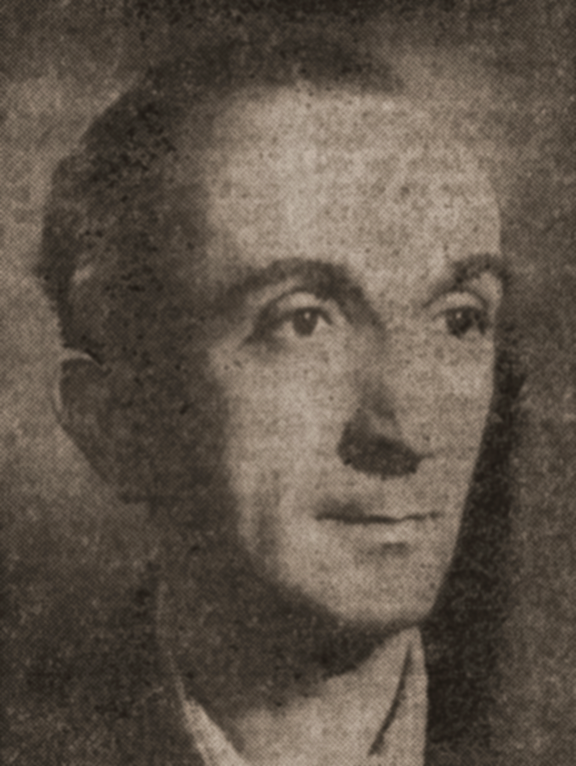
- Schileru c. 1950
- Born: Eugen Schiller; September 13, 1916; Brăila, Kingdom of Romania
- Died: August 10, 1968 (aged 51); Bucharest, Socialist Republic of Romania
- Occupations: Critic, academic, political activist, journalist, publisher, librarian, schoolteacher
- Writing career
- Period: c. 1930–1968
- Genres: Essay, monograph, biography, screenplay
- Movements: Impressionism; Marxist literary criticism; Socialist Realism

Eugen Schileru or Schilleru (pen name of Eugen Schiller; September 13, 1916 – August 10, 1968) was a Romanian art, film and literary critic, essayist and translator. Born in Brăila, he was of part-Jewish descent, being often described (and, during World War II, persecuted) as a Jew. He entered literary life in the early 1930s, while enrolled at Nicolae Bălcescu High School; he then attended the University of Bucharest, specializing in aesthetics, but also taking degrees in law and pedagogy. As a student, Schilleru became involved with the outlawed Romanian Communist Party and its Union of Communist Youth. He only got his break into the mainstream after the anti-fascist coup of August 1944, when he joined the new cultural establishment—he was initially involved with the generic democratic press, including National Liberal Party's Viitorul, and wrote on a variety of topics; with time, he was exclusively employed by communist papers, and had to embrace the core tenets of Socialist Realism.

For a while after 1948, Romania's new communist regime promoted Schileru, assigning him to a publishing company, to the Romanian Academy's library, and finally to the Nicolae Grigorescu Fine Arts Institute. He was secretly opposed to Socialist Realism, and offered moral support to writers repressed under its cultural guidelines. He alternated this dissident stance with shows of obedience, and used the party's dogmas against more senior colleagues, including George Călinescu and Petru Comarnescu. This interval came to an end in 1952, when Schileru himself was repressed by an "anti-cosmopolitan campaign". Though not entirely banned by the communist censors, he was pushed outside the literary mainstream, and prevented from advancing professionally. His reputation among nonconformists was instead consolidated, and he took his teaching to informal settings, including taverns and bars.

As a corollary of de-Stalinization in the mid-to-late 1950s, Romania also began abandoning Socialist Realism, and Schileru was able to return as an approved author—initially, with film chronicles celebrating Italian neorealism. He was then primarily active as a lecturer and columnist on art and literary topics, drawing both praise, for his innovative approach, and criticism, for his lengthy digressions and lack of academic focus. He only published a few of his scholarly works, including a 1966 monograph on Rembrandt, before his death from cancer at age 51. His main series of essays, revealing his core theories on art criticism, were published in installments over the next decade.

== Biography ==
=== Early life ===
Schileru was born in Brăila on September 13, 1916, into what later sources describe as a "family of intellectuals." His parents were Henri Schiller, an otorhinolaryngologist, and his wife Maria (née Demetrescu); his father was Jewish and his mother ethnic Romanian. In a more detailed report, poet George Astaloș, who had met and befriended Schileru in his later years, recalls being told that Henri, a man of German Jewish extraction, was also a medic and colonel in the Romanian Land Forces, while Maria had been born to a wealthy shepherd from Țara Moților. Schileru took a critical view of destitute Jews, once telling Astaloș: "There's nothing sadder on this earth than an impoverished Jew of an alcoholic Jewess. [...] A Jew, once he turns to poverty, never comes out of it!" According to fellow art historian Petru Comarnescu, he was himself a practicing Christian, with "something Dostoevskyian in his nature".

Eugen was first educated locally, at the Schwartzman Jewish–Romanian School, whose other alumni included Mihail Sebastian, Ilarie Voronca, Oscar Lemnaru, and Ury Benador. He then attended Brăila's Nicolae Bălcescu High School (1930–1934), during which time he began writing for local publications such as Columna lui Traian (1931), Premergătorul (1932–1933), and Tribuna (1934). He is tentatively identified as the pseudonymous editor of another magazine, Stiletul ("The Stiletto"), which put out a few issues in 1933. Also then, he collaborated on the literary review Start, put out by Ștefan Baciu of Brașov. He was associating with Sebastian, who introduced him to the successful novelist Mircea Eliade, who was conferencing in Brăila. He felt snubbed by Eliade, who interrupted their conversation to ask: "Where might one go for a good chorba in this Brăila of yours?" The memory of the incident haunted Schileru, and prompted Eliade to apologize in his later diaries.

Schileru went on to study at the literature and philosophy faculty of the University of Bucharest (1934–1938), specializing in "philosophical aesthetics". His younger friend, the art historian Geo Șerban, notes that he arrived in Bucharest alongside another author, Dolfi Trost, and that both were fleeing the rapidly declining Brăila. Both of them befriended Miron Radu Paraschivescu, who supported the outlawed Romanian Communist Party (PCR or PCdR), and, through him, became friends with non-communist liberals such as Mariana Șora. This period saw them opposing the rise of fascism, as embodied by the Iron Guard; members of the latter took their revenge by once beating up Trost, who had to be hospitalized for his injuries. Schileru was reportedly welcomed into the Democratic Students' Front, an anti-fascist group formed around Gogu Rădulescu; through this sort of affiliations, he was an adherent by proxy of the then-illegal Union of Communist Youth (UTC). The latter organization was a branch of the similarly outlawed PCR—in a 1972 writer Nicolae Dan Fruntelată included Schileru and Virgile Solomonidis on a list of PCR/UTC men who, at some point before 1939, had formed a party cell within the university's Faculty of Letters. Visual artist Mircia Dumitrescu, who was Schileru's student and friend later in life, also argues that his professor was a PCR member during the underground period.

Schileru was additionally a contributor to left-wing reviews ranging from Viața Romînească to Cuvântul Liber and Reporter. He became a "journalist of note with his 1930s contributions in the [communist] party's legal magazines". Under the pen name Adrian Schileru, he published in the Marxist review Era Nouă in 1936. He completed his mandatory service in the Land Forces alongside fellow students such as Gellu Naum, Silvian Iosifescu, Mihnea Gheorghiu, Al. I. Ștefănescu, Miron Constantinescu, and Alexandru Balaci. As Balaci recalls, the unit they trained with did not provide them with uniforms; Schileru, as an "indigent boy", begged his commanding officer not to have him perform exercises that would have ruined his suit.

=== Wartime persecution and communist rise ===
At university, Schileru studied under various scholars, including George Oprescu, and graduated with a degree in aesthetics; his thesis dealt with art and pathological manifestations. His advancement in this field was reportedly blocked by the cultural establishment, including the same Oprescu. Schileru had enlisted at the Bucharest Faculty of Law in parallel to his cultural studies, and, in 1939, also received a law degree. In 1938, he had received a vacation scholarship from the French Institute of Advanced Studies in Romania. Also that year, he graduated from a pedagogical institute. This allowed him to take up positions as a schoolteacher in Bucharest, moving from Matei Basarab to Gheorghe Lazăr. During World War II, he frequented Veac, a literary circle formed around the anti-fascist poet Ovidiu Rîureanu. Under Ion Antonescu, Romania was drawn into an alliance with Nazi Germany, and adopted policies of racial exclusion against Jews. Listed as Jewish, and banned from publishing, Schileru was still able to find work at Ecoul daily, through friends such as Paraschivescu and Virgil Ierunca.

Schileru was welcomed into the literary and journalistic mainstream during the war's later stages (after the anti-fascist coup of August 1944). Immediately after this event, he was employed as culture editor for the National Liberal mouthpiece, Viitorul, which also hosted some of his own articles. According to reports preserved by the Securitate, Schileru was for a while included on the editorial staff for the PCR's leading daily, România Liberă. He then collaborated as a columnist on Anton Dumitriu's daily, Democrația, as well as on the Marxist Veac Nou. His lecture on Jewish writers and their contribution to the French Resistance was arranged by the Jewish Democratic Committee in December 1945. In March 1946, Veac Nou hosted his overview of Soviet cinema, which also presented itself as a guide for uninformed Romanians. In May, he was inducted into the Romanian Writers' Society. He was also a regular with film and art chronicles Revista Fundațiilor Regale and in George Călinescu's Lumea, where he also produced translations of French works by Benjamin Fondane. Future screenwriter Radu Cosașu, who grew up reading the Lumea columns, argues that, over time, Schileru became especially respected and somewhat feared as a film chronicler.

By 1946, Schileru was covering the crossover of cinema and writing, exploring the transformation of American novels under the impact of cinema conventions and aesthetics. At Revista Fundațiilor Regale, he published "remarkable contributions" on Eugene O'Neill. According to Șerban, he was carried by "internal impulses to intervene, on multiple levels, toward the edification of public opinion", and overall a "spiritual restlessness". More controversially, Schileru joined up with Paraschivescu and Nicolae Moraru in pushing for strict communist dogmas, against independent-minded columnists who spoke of the period as one of intellectual crisis—the latter category included Tudor Arghezi, Barbu Brănișteanu, Ion Caraion, Șerban Cioculescu, Alexandru A. Philippide, Vladimir Streinu, Alexandru Talex, Tudor Teodorescu-Braniște, and Constant Tonegaru.

Around 1947, Schileru was working alongside Iosifescu and Vera Călin for the state publishing company, Editura de Stat, which was managed by poet Alexandru Toma. From 1948 to 1951, under the newly established Romanian communist regime, he directed the Romanian Academy's library. Șerban, at the time a young researcher, recalls that he was "always ready to give guiding suggestions, to let others borrow from his vast baggage of readings. His eyes were glistening upon discovering new venues for his bookish roving." A version of Lope de Vega's Dog in the Manger, done by Schileru from the Spanish original, was used by the Bucharest Municipal Theater for a 1948 production, with Beate Fredanov and Ion Lucian in the main roles. In 1949, Schileru became a professor of aesthetics at Bucharest's Nicolae Grigorescu Fine Arts Institute. Around the time of his appointment, he openly derided Moraru, who was lecturing in Marxism-Leninism, by asking him to distinguish between Nicolai Hartmann and Eduard von Hartmann; Moraru, who only had a high-school education, was unable to respond, and humiliated himself.

As recounted by fellow art scholar Radu Bogdan, Schileru and Comarnescu were equally shocked to discover that the new regime was stifling independent art, including one of a leftist bent, and imposing Socialist Realism as the singular dogma. Schileru himself undermined Moraru's influence at the Institute by making his students read the more classical works of Tudor Vianu. The period witnessed other episodes in which he transgressed against the expected behavior. He applied his "sharp tongue" to cultural figures of the regime that he viewed as mediocre, once calling Sașa Pană a "Barbu Lăzăreanu of surrealism"; he also maintained a friendship with the Christian esotericist Marcel Avramescu, who, upon his invitation, performed demonstrations of hypnosis in Călin's apartment. Novelist Constantin Țoiu, who was being subjected to ideological "verification" (during which he denied the separate existence of a working-class culture), reports that he was comforted by a group of "valuable Jews", including Schileru, Iosifescu, and Călin. He contrasts this group with Jews such as Leonte Răutu and Iosif Chișinevschi, who had built their careers on a "fanatical" endorsement of Stalinism, and whom Schileru and the others secretly despised. Journalist and editor Vlaicu Bârna recalls however that, in early 1950, Schileru used the "classics of Marxism" against his former employer Călinescu—advising state publishers to not feature Călinescu's new novel, Bietul Ioanide, since it was ideologically suspect. Bârna intervened to undercut Schileru's report, and managed to get the book approved by communist censors.

=== Sidelining and return ===
In 1951, Schileru himself was formally investigated by the governing Communist Party, now called Workers' Party (PMR), after accessing a scholarship for creative writing without delivering the required paper. In May 1952, as the PMR purged itself of Ana Pauker and her supporters, the authorities also instigated their own version of the "anti-cosmopolitan campaign". Schileru was caught up in this backlash, and singled out at the Plenary of the Union of Plastic Artists (UAP) for acting in a "cosmopolitan" way. That same month, Contemporanul journal hosted a large article by Aurel Haiduc, which detailed the accusations brought up against Schileru, Bogdan, and other authors. According to Bogdan, the piece was very likely composed by the PMR's agitprop department. Schileru was not prevented from publishing and, in 1954, was reportedly the unsigned contributor to Oprescu's History of Romanian Sculpture—his chapter, covering the more modern contributions, was also the first communist-era work to praise Constantin Brâncuși as an "exceptional talent".

Though Schileru was generally not granted permission to leave Romania during his entire subsequent career (and had to rely on traveling friends to obtain any foreign books), he was able to conserve his position at Grigorescu Institute. Dumitrescu notes that he was constantly "sacked from the faculty" by the very communists he once believed in, but again reintegrated; into his fifties, he could not advance to a position other than lecturer. His influence was nevertheless preserved: students he helped form intellectually include Andrei Pleșu, Marin Tarangul, and Dan Hăulică. The latter recalls that Schileru always ignored the regime's commands and, during political-training sessions, preferred to transform these into friendly chats about the latest art books. Some of his educational work was done entirely outside academia, reflecting his bohemianism. His "Socratic dialogues" could be spontaneously generated in any environment—"in the coffeehouse, during street-walks, and even during evenings of agitated bacchanals in some random tavern". As the offbeat literary scene was formally repressed, he joined other writers in "sordid" dives, such as the Singapore Bar in Rosetti Square. In a 2010s interview, poet Mircea Ivănescu recounts that he was initiated into heavy drinking by Schileru.

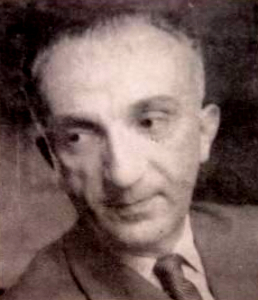
Schileru c. 1960

After 1956, George Ivașcu, who was editor at Contemporanul, sought to expand that magazine's coverage of all artistic areas, and offered Schileru a permanent column (he was recruited alongside Vianu, Ion Frunzetti, Ecaterina Oproiu, and D. I. Suchianu). He wrote about film, until he had to renounce his column in favor of Emil Suter—a dogmatic Stalinist who was brothers with the official literary critic, Ion Vitner. Schileru was vindicated during the de-Stalinization period of the late 1950s, which also witnessed the phasing out of Socialist Realism. In early 1957, the UAP chief ideologue, M. H. Maxy, was formally exposed by the PMR's Răutu, who allowed other Union members to express criticism of Maxy's dogmatism. Schileru was hesitant to join in: his speech on the occasion was noticeably ambiguous, a way of "running with the hare and hunting with the hounds". In 1958, the regime allowed Romanian moviegoers a glimpse of Italian neorealism, by encouraging the belated distribution of Roberto Rossellini's Rome, Open City. In 1958, Cesare Zavattini was welcomed in Bucharest; this in turn prompted Schileru and his colleague Florian Potra to openly discuss the merits of neorealism, and to speak of it as a positive influence on Romania's own film school. He himself continued to be formally attached to Socialist Realism, and, in Contemporanul, spoke of it as the more superior form of modern art, since it could answer the valid questions posed by Existentialism and Neo-expressionism. In the Western bloc, "even those works that are an indictment of the reality in which the author and his people live, are depressing with their hopelessness and increase the chaos of thoughts and emotions."

In January 1961, Paul Barbăneagră released a documentary film on Romania's decade of Socialist Realist art; Schileru provided the screenplay. The result was criticized by I. Toma of Contemporanul, for both its writing and its montage. By then, Schileru had been employed as the film chronicler at Gazeta Literară. His work there received mixed reviews from his literary peers: Sami Damian referred to the column as "competent", though he chided his "overflow of information" and desire to "astound" his readers; Eugen Simion was impressed by Schileru's ability to draw connections between cinema and other arts, but noted that he was "hesitant" in his verdicts, even when it came to panning films that were of dubious quality. Cosașu praises Schileru as a film critic, noting that he was highly influential in bringing "nonconformist art" to Romanian screens. He was mainly producing short and occasional works on fine arts (exhibition catalogues, aesthetic commentaries, notes about Impressionism, classical and contemporary painting). Comarnescu, who was by then his rival, argues that some of his contributions showed Schileru's overconfidence in his abilities, in particular when he discussed stage design though he "never went to the theater"—the result was an "embarrassingly uninformed" article. They conferenced together about Michelangelo, with Schileru covering the pictorial contributions. According to Comarnescu, this was another embarrassment, since his colleague confronted the public with "sensationalistic" details, failing to give attendees a "substantial overview" of his subject matter.

=== Final years ===
During the liberalization episode that peaked around 1964, Schileru could be seen queuing up for Western magazines that had been vetted be censors, alongside figures such as Cosașu, Ovid S. Crohmălniceanu, Horia Deleanu, and Nicolae Steinhardt. According to Cosașu, he was passionate about West Germany, and instructing his peers that they should read Die Welt rather than Le Monde. The same friend notes that Schileru was never alone, but rather integrated within various groups, "from the kids who played in [Romania's] first-ever electric-guitar orchestras to the brilliant young artists, in whose youth he believed as if fascinated by some vital genius". Seen by Comarnescu as outstandingly ugly with "rodent-like" jaws, his speech "monotonous", he was nevertheless always pursuing "beautiful women". Comarnescu believes that self-awareness, and a string of rejections, are what pushed Schileru deeper into alcoholism. His jazz-man friend, Johnny Răducanu, contrarily reports that Schileru was always outstandingly successful in his romantic life.

Comarnescu, who was allowed to visit foreign countries, prepared an in-depth study on Rembrandt, publishing it in 1956. He claims that Schileru, being jealous of him, tried to prevent the book from publishing, and, when he could not succeed in this, made sure that it was ignored by other professionals. Schileru eventually completed his own Rembrandt monograph, which came out at Editura Meridiane in 1966. Comarnescu, who was the first to review the work for print, noted that it some portions were heavily reliant on Otto Benesch, to the point of plagiarism. He believes that this was because Schileru, who knew his subject well and had been reading "tens of authors", was too involved with drink and his "sentimental dramas" to function on an academic level. Scholar Emil Moangă calls the book "penetrating and empathetic", noting that Schileru had placed his subject's style and psychology in their historical context, leading to a larger meditation on the development of chiaroscuro from its sources in the International Gothic. As Moangă notes, Schileru was himself a literary Impressionist, though one who could always back his interpretations with the "absolute rigors" of scholarship.

With Frunzetti and Hăulică, Schileru attended a congress of the International Association of Art Critics, held at Prague in September 1966. Alongside Liviu Ciulei and Paul Bortnovschi, he was commissioned by Meridiane to work on an album covering the history of Romanian stage design. The art critic always remained in touch with literary life, prefacing translations from Antoine de Saint-Exupéry, Thomas Mann, Herman Melville, Alberto Moravia and Cesare Pavese. Schileru himself translated, alone or in collaboration, works by Sinclair Lewis, Ernest Hemingway, James Hilton, Horace McCoy, Giovanni Germanetto, André Ribard, Claude Lévi-Strauss, Albert Maltz, Richard Sasuly and Tirso de Molina. As reported by Comarnescu, Schileru spent an inordinate amount of time researching local figures such as sculptor Victor Roman and the "mediocre painter" Ion Sima—the latter, only because Sima's wife had "lured" him in with food and drink. Comarnescu, who acknowledges that Schileru still had genuine worth as a historian, posthumously castigates him for not finishing his coverage of more worthy artists, such as Henri Catargi and Paul Klee.

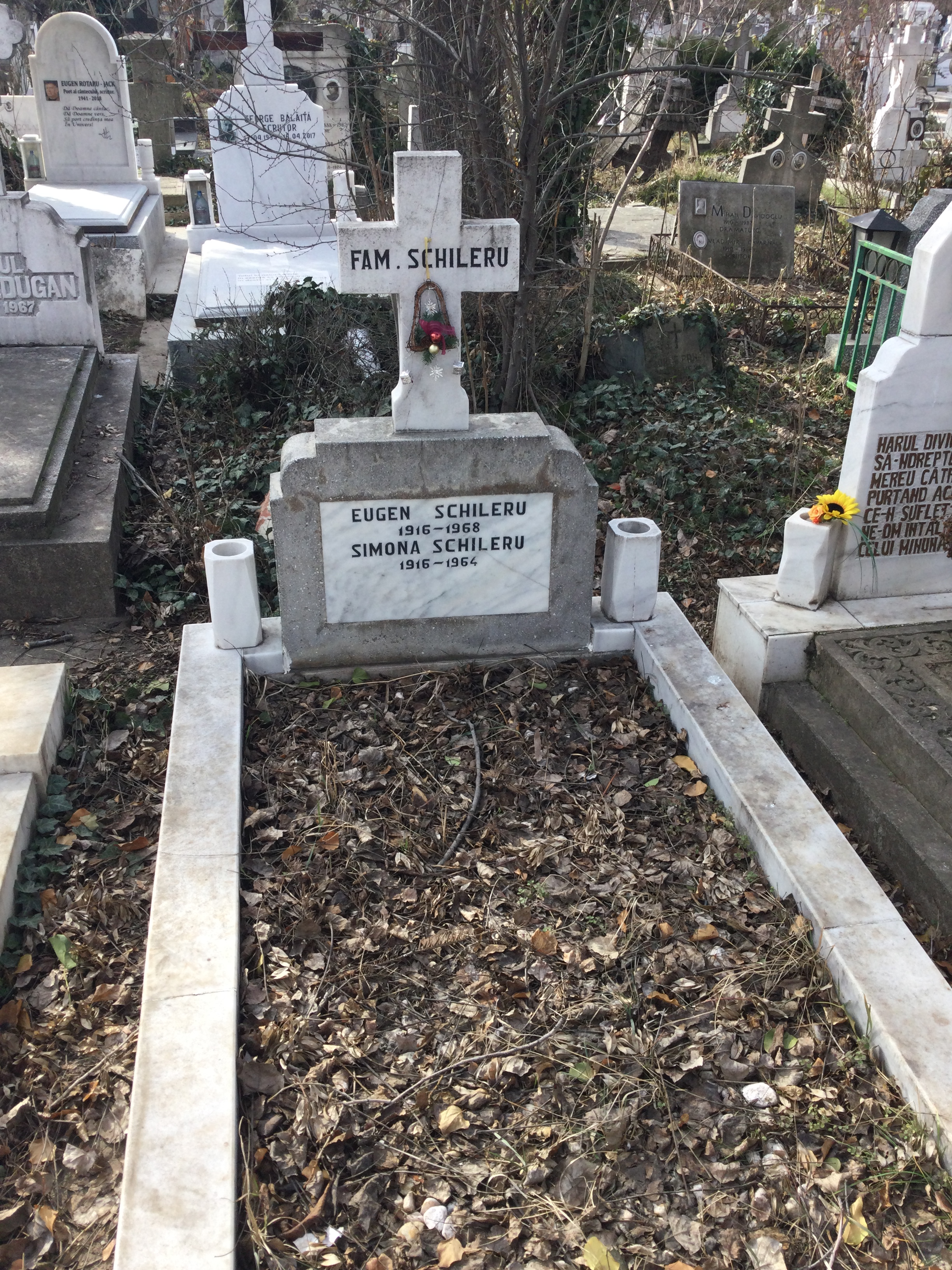
Grave at Bellu cemetery

Astaloș believes that Schileru's health was ultimately compromised by the liquor he imbibed at Singapore Bar. He continued to be active as a professional critic to at least June 1968, but was shortly after diagnosed with cancer. As noted by his colleague Comarnescu, the disease had an "amazingly fast" progression. He died in Bucharest on August 10, 1968, just shortly after having taken over as chair of the Institute's Art History Department. As reported by Șerban, Schileru's death at the age of 51 was completely unexpected, leaving many to realize his cultural importance only through his absence. His body was laid in state at the UAP, before being taken for burial at Bellu cemetery, on August 14. The funeral oration was delivered by Comarnescu. He later confessed that he genuinely missed Schileru, who would still have had time to fulfill his promises. An obituary piece in Scînteia noted: "Gifted with a rare charm, brilliant in his lectures and conferencing, attentive and loving when it came to cultivating young talents, he has had a far-reaching contribution toward shaping new generations of artists and art theorists, over two decades." Schileru had left a large collection of books which were unusually hard to find under communism. Most of these were sold off.

== Legacy ==
Shortly after, Schileru's unfinished introduction to the poetry of Dan Botta was included in a definitive Botta collection. It impressed critics for its rejection of clichés, resisting Botta's depiction as a "poet of death", thus recontextualizing his modern "Orphism". Schileru's essays on Sima and Ion Irimescu were published in 1968 and 1969, followed by the monograph Impresionismul (1969). The latter was issued from raw text, and was as such incomplete; according to Moangă, it should be praised for its "stylistic clarity" in discussing obscure pictorial techniques, and with its analysis of Impressionism as an intellectual current and a mood (in outlining this thesis, Schileru proposed that Marcel Proust was a literary exponent).

Scrisoarea de dragoste ("Love Letter"), comprising eight of Schileru's essays on various topics, appeared in 1971, also at Meridiane; they were arranged for print by his daughter, Mihaela (or Micaela) Schileru-Chiose, and carried a preface by sociologist Miron Constantinescu. The anthologized pieces are noted for their unifying thread, which is a rejection of grand metaphors in favor of precise case-studies (though the title itself is a metaphor, likening artistic processes to a correspondence between lovers); Schileru cites Alain Robbe-Grillet and Gottfried Benn as his direct precursors in the advocacy of stylistic concreteness. Beyond this, he "advocates for sincerity and authenticity, censuring mimicry, mannerism and eclecticism." With additional input from the works of Norbert Wiener and Max Dvořák, Scrisoarea de dragoste tackled modernist art as "entropy", and therefore as a function of alienation under capitalism.

Some of Schileru's essays appeared in Hebrew translation in 1972, as part of an anthology of Romanian Jewish authors. Marcel Marcian, who was himself included in that volume, found the criteria questionable, particularly since Schileru was among those who, despite being sampled, "had no connection whatsoever with Judaism, in their writings." At home, Pleșu sought to revive interest in his teacher's work in 1975, when he anthologized his essays as Preludii critice ("Critical Preludes"). It was accompanied by Pleșu's own "moving recollections". As read by Moangă, Preludii critice is the closest to a "system", in which criticism itself is shown as serving the paideia of modern citizens. This posthumous period also witnessed the publication of Schileru's commentaries on Romanian Television, as well as samples of his translations from German poetry; many other interventions remained scattered and unpublished as of 2021. For a few months in 2009, Bucharest's Dialog Art Gallery hosted an exhibit showcasing Schileru's life and surviving books, alongside portraits done by Corneliu Baba and Henry Mavrodin, and engravings by Mircia Dumitrescu. His daughter, who had emigrated to Canada, published a memoir of her father in 2016, the centenary of his birth.
