= Vasile Goraș =

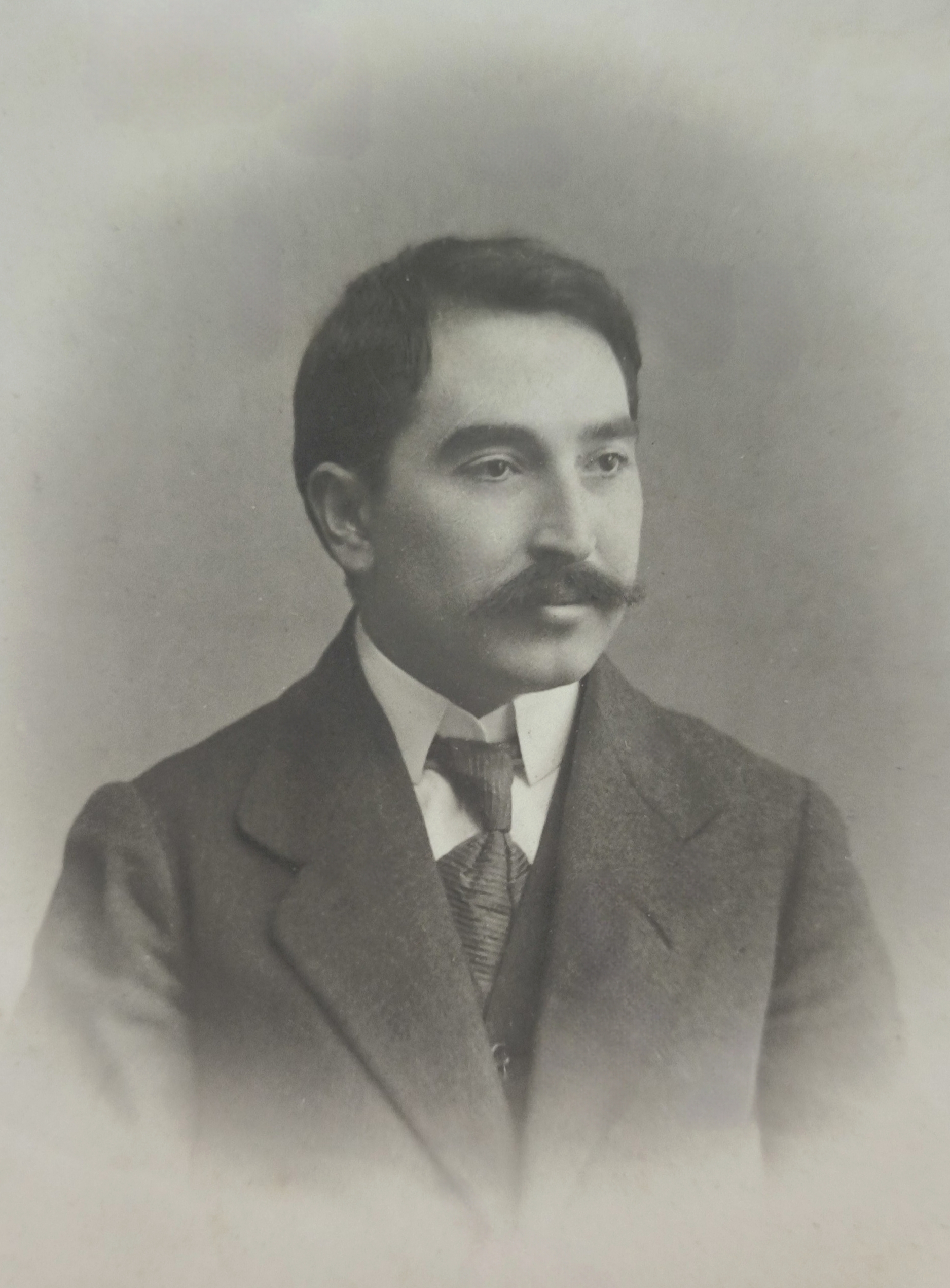
- Professor Emerit Vasile Goraș in 1913
- Born: January 6, 1882; Botoșani, Kingdom of Romania
- Died: September 1, 1975 (aged 93); Bucharest, Socialist Republic of Romania
- Resting place: Mărgineni, Bacău
- Education: Faculty of Letters at the "Alexandru Ioan Cuza" University of Iași
- Occupations: Professor emeritus, Principal
- Years active: 35
- Employer: Nicolae Bălcescu National College Brăila
- Known for: classical philology; Emeritus Professor of philology and history; 18 years high-school principal; senator
- Spouse: Ana Cândea (1914)
- Awards: Order of Cultural Merit; 1907 Jubilee Medal; Commemorative Cross of the 1916–1918 War; Order of the Crown of Romania; Order of the Star of Romania; Officier de l’Instruction Publique (France)

Vasile Goraș (January 6, 1882, Botoșani – September 1, 1975, Bucharest) was a Romanian classical philologist, educator, and politician. He served for 18 years as principal of the “Nicolae Bălcescu” High School in Brăila during the interwar period and was later a senator in the Romanian Parliament. He was awarded the title of emeritus Professor of philology and history and was active in promoting education and cultural life in Brăila. In recognition of his contributions to the city, he was posthumously named an Honorary Citizen of Brăila.

== Biography ==
He was born in Botoșani and attended Primary School No. 1 and the “August Treboniu Laurian” High School, which he completed in 1900. In 1906, he graduated from the Faculty of Letters and Philosophy in Iași, earning a Magna cum laude degree in classical philology.

During the 1906–1907 academic year, he taught at the “Costache Negruzzi” Boarding High School in Iași. On September 1, 1907, he transferred to the “Nicolae Bălcescu” High School in Brăila, where he worked until his retirement on August 31, 1941.

During World War I, Vasile Goraș was among the seven teachers of the “Nicolae Bălcescu” High School in Brăila who were mobilized to the front in 1916. He was taken prisoner and interned in a camp in Kardzhali. After the war, he was decorated and recognized as a war veteran.

In 1914, Vasile Goraș married Ana Cândea (1886 – 1966), a philosophy teacher at the Girls’ High School in Brăila (today the “Gh. M. Murgoci” National College). She was also involved in the city's social and educational life, participating in charitable activities and fundraising events supporting the boarding school of the “Nicolae Bălcescu” High School. They had two daughters: Georgeta Goraș – associate professor of engineering at the Polytechnic Institute of Bucharest, and Rodica Goraș, a church painter.

He passed away on September 1, 1975, in Bucharest at the age of 93. He is buried in Mărgineni, Bacău County.

== Teaching and leadership activity ==
Between 1907 and 1941, he taught ancient Greek, Romanian language, and history at the “Nicolae Bălcescu” High School in Brăila. He was appreciated for the rigor and passion with which he instilled in his students a solid knowledge of the classical languages.

Vasile Goraș coordinated cultural and philanthropic societies, organized educational conferences, and maintained correspondence with cultural figures such as Perpessicius, Mihail Sebastian, and Panait Istrati. He was a member of the committee responsible for drafting school curricula for the Ministry of Education and served on examination boards for proficiency and theoretical baccalaureate exams in Latin, and ancient Greek.

He held the position of principal of the “Nicolae Bălcescu” High School in Brăila during several terms:

- March 1, 1919 – June 1, 1931
- July 1, 1932 – August 15, 1932
- May 1, 1936 – August 31, 1941

This cumulative period of nearly 18 years makes him the longest-serving principal of the institution to date.

He founded the “C. Sandu Aldea” Association to grant scholarships to deserving students with limited financial means. He promoted cultural and educational activities in Brăila, encouraging students’ interest in classical languages, literature, and artistic creation.

Vasile Goraș was esteemed by his students for his fairness and empathy. According to The Diary of Mihail Sebastian, Sebastian returned to the high school in 1936 for the celebration marking ten years since his graduation and witnessed a remarkable gesture by the principal: he publicly apologized to a former student for an injustice committed by omission, caused by fatigue, thus demonstrating his respect and sense of responsibility toward his students. The gesture deeply impressed those present and highlights the way Vasile Goraș combined professional rigor with human sensitivity.

== Public activities ==
On January 24, 1915, Vasile Goraș, in his capacity as a teacher at the “Nicolae Bălcescu” High School, took part in the oath-taking ceremony of the “Vlad Țepeș” Legion, held in “Sfinții Arhangheli” Square. The event was presided over by His Royal Highness Prince Carol, who was then on his first visit to Brăila as heir to the throne. After the oath and the scouts’ parade, the Prince attended an official luncheon organized at the Prefecture, where Professor Goraș was among the distinguished guests representing the local civic and administrative life.

In 1931, Vasile Goraș was elected senator for Brăila County on the lists of the National Union, becoming involved in the public life of interwar Romania alongside his teaching and cultural activity.

== Distinctions and titles ==
- Order of Cultural Merit, First Class, Knight rank
- 1907 Jubilee Medal
- Commemorative Cross of the 1916–1918 War
- Order of the Crown of Romania – Officer and Knight ranks
- Order of the Star of Romania – Officer rank
- Officier de l’Instruction Publique (France)
- Veteran of World War I
- Emeritus Professor of the Romanian People's Republic (Decree no. 65/1964)
- Honorary Citizen of the Municipality of Brăila (posthumously, Local Council Decision no. 11 of February 12, 1997)

== Donations and legacy ==
In the late 1960s, Vasile Goraș donated to the Brăila Museum a valuable documentary collection consisting of 154 volumes, 25 notebooks, and 121 period journals, including 92 issues of the magazine “Cuget Clar” from the years 1936–1940. The collection established through this donation is preserved within the Memorial Section and bears the donor's name.

In 2000, his work Anthology from the Writings of the Latin Fathers, a translation from Latin, was published posthumously by Anastasia Publishing House.

== Archival fund ==
Vasile Goraș's activity is also documented in a personal archival fund preserved at the National Archives of Romania, covering the period 1914–1975 and comprising 23 archival units (inventory no. 75). The collection includes correspondence with figures from artistic and literary life, such as the tenors Nicu Apostolescu and George Niculescu-Basu, the actor Alexandru Ionescu-Ghibericon, and the writer Mihail Sebastian, as well as photographic materials related to the activity of the “Nicolae Bălcescu” High School in Brăila, including the 1939 events marking the 75th anniversary of the institution's founding.
