= Adriana G. Ioachimescu =

Romanian-American neuroendocrinologist

Adriana G. Ioachimescu is a Romanian-American neuroendocrinologist and professor at the Medical College of Wisconsin in the Division of Endocrinology and Molecular Medicine and the Director for Pituitary and Adrenal Disease Program, where she joined in 2023. She was born in Bucharest, Romania. Her research focuses on pituitary disorders and developing therapies for conditions like Cushing’s syndrome.

== Education ==
Ioachimescu completed her medical degree at the Carol Davila University of Medicine and Pharmacy in 1995. While she was studying here, Dr. Mihai Coculescu, her endocrinology professor, inspired her to pursue a career in endocrinology. In 2001, she also earned her PhD of Neuroendocrinology at the same university. Later, in 2003, she went to Danbury Hospital for an internship in internal medicine. She continued her education at multiple locations with an internal medicine residency at Danbury Hospital, Yale University, and at Cleveland Clinic. She also completed an endocrinology fellowship through Cleveland Clinic in 2006.

== Career ==
Before she moved to Wisconsin, her previous position was at Emory University School of Medicine, Dr. Ioachimescu was a Professor of Medicine in Endocrinology and Neurological Surgery. She was as co-director and co-founder of the Emory Neuroendocrine Pituitary Center and also worked as a consulting editor at Endocrinology and Metabolism Clinics. Dr. Ioachimescu co-founded the Emory Neuroendocrine Pituitary Center in 2008. She became senior medical director for the Medical College of Wisconsin (MCW) as well as the director of the Pituitary and Adrenal Program at MCW. She is currently the chair of the Early Career Committee and serves as faculty for the Master Pituitary Course for Fellows in Training of the Pituitary Society. Additionally, Ioachimescu has shared her expertise at various conferences organized by the Endocrine Society, Pituitary Society, American Association of Clinical Endocrinology (AACE), International Society of Endocrinology, and others.

Ioachimescu serves as a student mentor as the chair of the Early Career Committee in the Pituitary Society in the Medical College of Wisconsin. She has also been recognized as a distinguished faculty member of the Master Pituitary Course for Fellows in Training of the Pituitary Society. Through conferences organized by the Endocrine Society, Pituitary Society, American Association of Clinical Endocrinology, and the International Society of Endocrinology, Dr. Ioachimescu has been able to share her work in the growing field of pituitary disorders through many conferences in the field of endocrinology. She is also a part of the scientific board of the Pituitary Network Association, where they are dedicated to increasing the education of pituitary disease through webinars, educational resources and books.

== Research ==
Ioachimescu has published in peer-reviewed journals, such as Endocrine Reviews, Endocrinology and Metabolism Clinics of North America, Pituitary, and Journal of Endocrine Society, while also having co-edited the book “Pituitary Disorders Throughout the Life Cycle." Dr. Ioachimescu has research focusing on the endocrine systems of pituitary diseases and how to best manage and diagnose them. She has focused on the development of the disease and the outcomes in order to validating marker and create more therapies for neuroendocrinology conditions.

She also did a study that associated patients with immunologic thrombocytopenia and the likelihood of that patient developing thyroid disease being higher. She showed with this study that patients with immunologic thrombocytopenia should be screened routinely with thyroid function tests.

== Awards and honors ==
Ioachimescu has received awards and honors including the following:

2018 – Woodruff Leadership Academy Fellowship,

2019 – Educator Appreciation Day Recognition (Emory School of Medicine).

== Notable publications ==
- Fleseriu M, Auchus R, Bancos I, Ben-Shlomo A, Bertherat J, Biermasz NR, Boguszewski CL, Bronstein MD, Buchfelder M, Carmichael JD, Casanueva FF, Castinetti F, Chanson P, Findling J, Gadelha M, Geer EB, Giustina A, Grossman A, Gurnell M, Ho K, Ioachimescu AG, Kaiser UB, Karavitaki N, Katznelson L, Kelly DF, Lacroix A, McCormack A, Melmed S, Molitch M, Mortini P, Newell-Price J, Nieman L, Pereira AM, Petersenn S, Pivonello R, Raff H, Reincke M, Salvatori R, Scaroni C, Shimon I, Stratakis CA, Swearingen B, Tabarin A, Takahashi Y, Theodoropoulou M, Tsagarakis S, Valassi E, Varlamov EV, Vila G, Wass J, Webb SM, Zatelli MC, Biller BMK (October 24, 2021). "Consensus on diagnosis and management of Cushing's disease: a guideline update". The Lancet. Diabetes and Endocrinology. 9 (12): 847-875. doi: 10.1016/S2213-8587(21)00235-7. PMID 34687601.
- Giustina A, Barkhoudarian G, Beckers A, Ben-Shlomo A, Biermasz N, Biller B, Boguszewski C, Bolanowski M, Bollerslev J, Bonert V, Bronstein MD, Buchfelder M, Casanueva F, Chanson P, Clemmons D, Fleseriu M, Formenti AM, Freda P, Gadelha M, Geer E, Gurnell M, Heaney AP, Ho KKY, Ioachimescu AG, Lamberts S, Laws E, Losa M, Maffei P, Mamelak A, Mercado M, Molitch M, Mortini P, Pereira AM, Petersenn S, Post K, Puig-Domingo M, Salvatori R, Samson SL, Shimon I, Strasburger C, Swearingen B, Trainer P, Vance ML, Wass J, Wierman ME, Yuen KCJ, Zatelli MC, Melmed S (September 12, 2020). "Multidisciplinary management of acromegaly: A consensus".Reviews in Endocrine and Metabolic Disorders. 21 (4): 667-678. doi: 10.1007/s11154-020-09588-z. PMID 32914330.
- Hamrahian AH, Ioachimescu AG, Remer EM, Motta-Ramirez G, Bogabathina H, Levin HS, Reddy S, Gill IS, Siperstein A, Bravo EL (December 12, 2004)."Clinical utility of noncontrast computed tomography attenuation value (housfield units) to differentiate adrenal adenomas/hyperplasias from nonadenomas: Cleveland Clinic experience." The Journal of Clinical Endocrinology and Metabolism. 90 (2): 871-7. doi: 10.1210/jc.2004-1627 PMID 15572420.
- Ioachimescu AG, Brennan DM, Hoar BM, Hazen SL, Hoogwerf BJ (February 2, 2008) "Serum uric acid is an independent predictor of all-cause mortality in patients at high risk of cardiovascular disease: a preventive cardiology information system (PreCis) database cohort study." Arthritis and Rheumatism. 58 (2): 623-30. doi: 10.1002/art.23121. PMID 18240236.
- Tamaskar I, Bukowski R, Elson P, Ioachimescu AG, Wood L, Dreicer R, Mekhail T, Garcia J, Rini BI (October 27, 2007). "Thyroid function test abnormalities in patients with metastatic renal cell carcinoma treated with sorafenib." Annals of Oncology: Official Journal of the European Society for Medical Oncology. 19 (2): 265-8. doi: 10.1093/annonc/mdm483. PMID 17962201.
- Giustina A, Barkan A, Beckers A, Biermasz N, Biller BMK, Boguszewski C, Bolanowski M, Bonert V, Bronstein MD, Casanueva FF, Clemmons D, Colao A, Ferone D, Fleseriu M, Frara S, Gadelha MR, Ghigo E, Gurnell M, Heaney AP, Ho K, Ioachimescu A, Katznelson L, Kelestimur F, Kopchick J, Krsek M, Lamberts S, Losa M, Luger A, Maffei P, Marazuela M, Mazziotti G, Mercado M, Mortini P, Neggers S, Pereira AM, Petersenn S, Puig-Domingo M, Salvatori R, Shimon I, Strasburger C, Tsagarakis S, van der Lely AJ, Wass J, Zatelli MC, Melmed S (October 14, 2019). "A Consensus on the Diagnosis and Treatment of Acromegaly Comorbidities: An Update." The Journal of Clinical Endocrinology and Metabolism. 105 (4): dgz096. doi: 10.1210/clinem/dgz096. PMID 31606735.
