= Nicolae Minovici Folk Art Museum =

Museum in Bucharest, Romania

Coordinates: 44°29′03.48″N 26°04′31.08″E

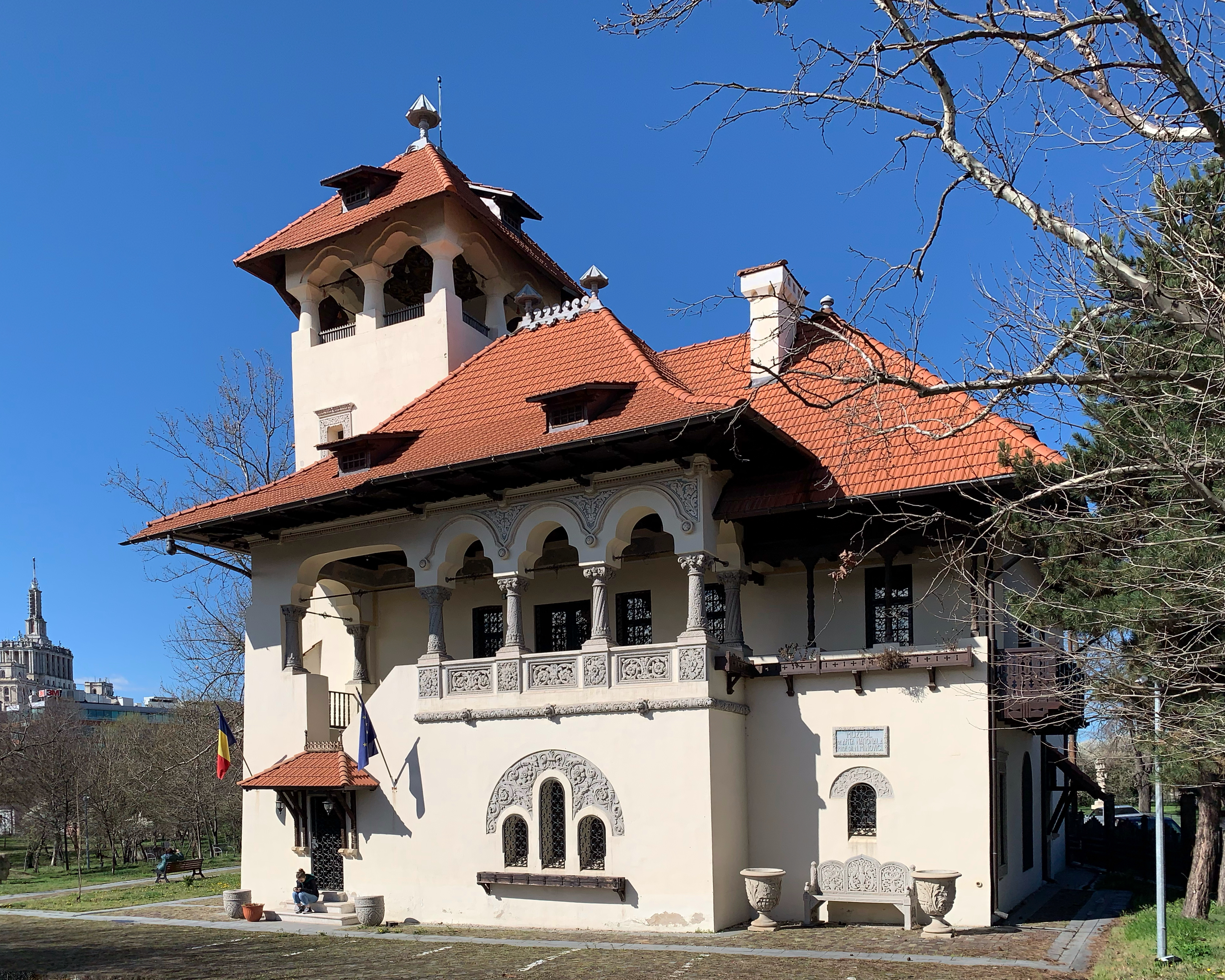
The museum in 2023

The Dr. Nicolae Minovici Folk Art Museum (Romanian: Muzeul de Artă Populară „Prof. Dr. Nicolae Minovici”) is a museum located at 1 Dr. Nicolae Minovici Street in the Băneasa district of Bucharest, Romania.

Initially built as a retreat on the city outskirts for Nicolae Minovici between 1906 and 1907, the house evolved into Bucharest's first folk art museum, with an expansive collection of ethnographic displays. The building was designed by the owner's friend, Cristofi Cerchez, in the Romanian Revival style.

The museum building is listed as a historic monument by Romania's Ministry of Culture and Religious Affairs.

== See also ==
- List of museums in Bucharest
