= Mihai Vodă Monastery =

Monastery in Bucharest, Romania

- Mănăstirea Mihai Vodă
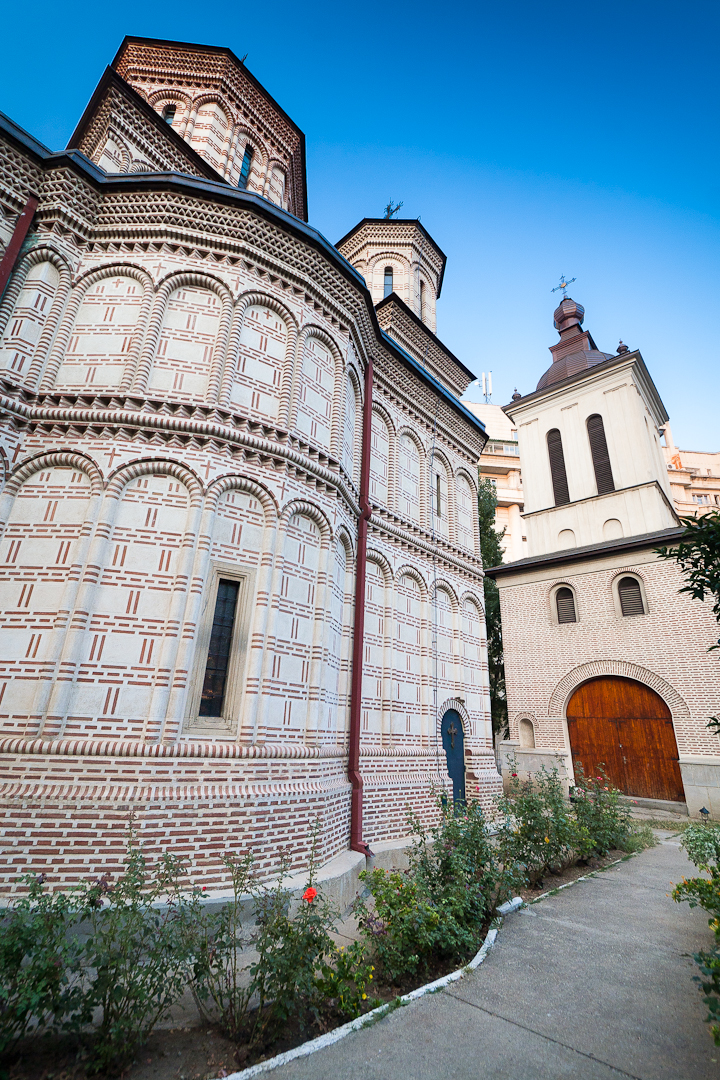
- Mihai Vodă Monastery

- Location within Romania
- Interactive map of Mihai Vodă Monastery

Monastery information
- Established: 1591
- Dedication: Orthodox

People
- Founder: Mihai Viteazul

Site
- Location: Strada Sapienței 4 Bucharest, Romania
- Coordinates: 44°25′54″N 26°5′35″E
- Other information: Titular saint: Saint Nicholas

The Mihai Vodă Monastery, founded by Mihai Viteazul, is one of the oldest buildings in Bucharest. It was built in 1591, surrounded by stone walls, similar to a fortress. Close to the Dambovița River, the monastery buildings served multiple purposes over time such as residence of the country's leaders, military hospital, medical school and the site of the National Archives of Romania. The monastery was an important archeological site; inside the monastery yard used to be a Dacian archeological site, more than 3000 years old, where old pottery and other relics were found.

In 1813 Mihai Vodă Monastery was "one of the largest monasteries of Romania". Between 1908 and 1909, Cristofi Cerchez, head of architecture for the Ministry of Religious Affairs, supervised work on the State Archives at the Monastery.

At the time of the communist regime in 1985, the church building was moved on rails 285 metres east and hidden in its present location on Sapienței street, next to Splaiul Independenței street and Izvor Park. That was to make way for the Civic Centre. The medieval cloisters and ancillary buildings were demolished.

Mihai Vodă Monastery has been included into the List of historical monuments of Romania and has been classified under the code B-II-a-A-19644.

== The legend ==
A legend explains the motivation that led to the foundation of the monastery by Mihai Viteazul. According to this, in a very very cold winter, probably between years 1589 and 1591, Mihai, the stepson of Pătrașcu cel Bun (in English, "Pătrașcu the Good") was arrested by the leader Alexandru cel Rău (in English, "Alexandru the Bad"), who accused him having conspired to gain leadership of the country.

Mihai was taken to Saint Antony Square, the place where he should have been decapitated. The road to the square passed by the Church Albă Postăvari, next to the Hill Spirei (in Romanian, Dealul Spirei). Mihai, with permission from his guards, stopped to attend divine liturgy at the church and bowed to the icon of Saint Nicholas, promising him to build a monastery nearby if he should escape death.

There are three explanations of how Mihai escaped execution by Alexandru cel Rău. The first tells of a ransom paid by 12 aristocrats. The second claims that the physical qualities of Mihai being tall and very handsome caused the executioner, upon seeing Mihai, to throw away his axe and run away. A third version of events says that Mihai was released after the protests of members of the community who had gathered at the place of execution.

Once liberated, Mihai kept his promise and built a monastery.

== Gallery ==
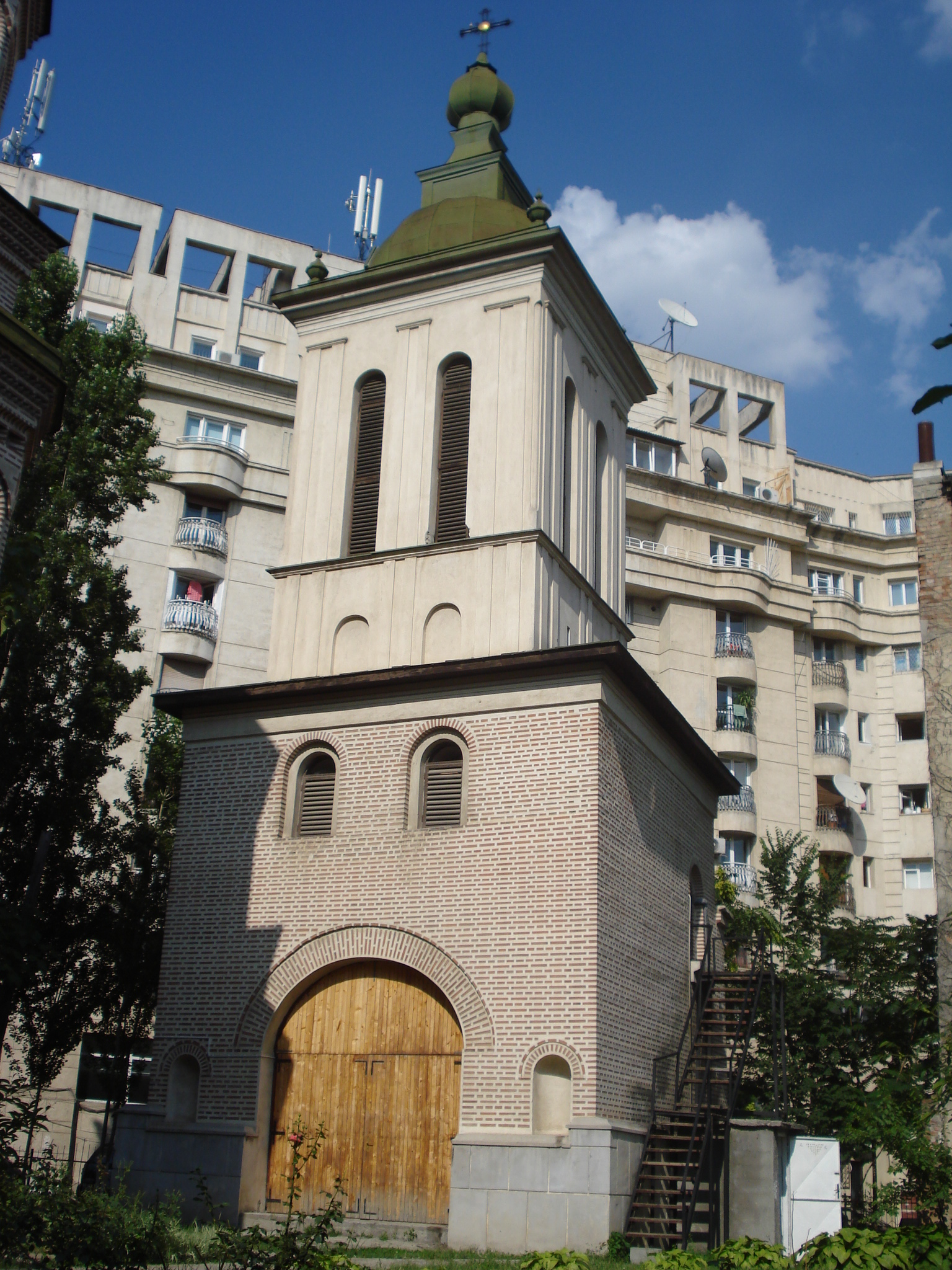
Bell tower of the monastery

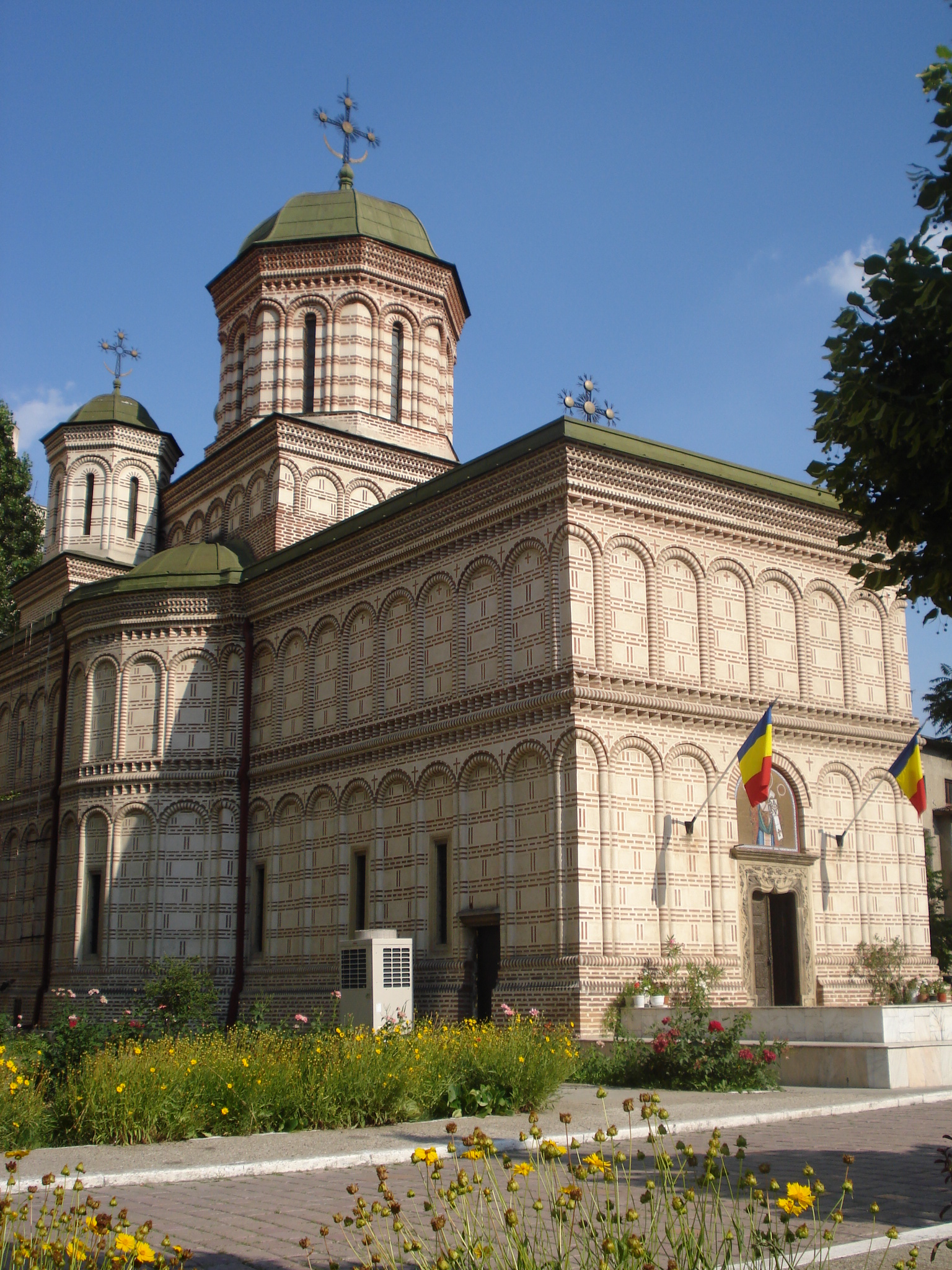
Mihai Vodă Monastery

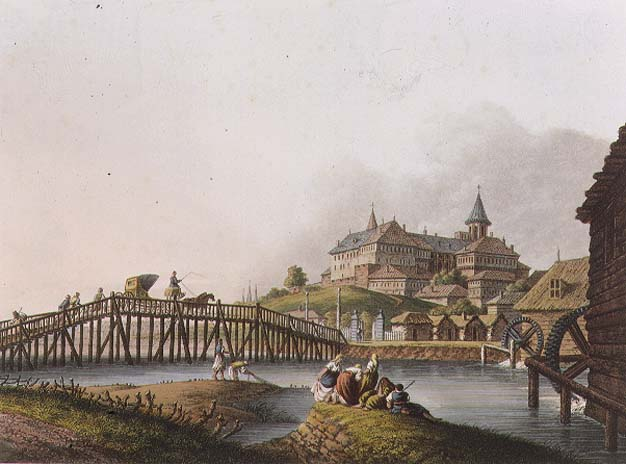
The bridge over the river Dâmbovița, getting to the Mihai Vodă Monastery (William Watts, following the drawing from 1793 of Luigi Mayer)
