= Nicolae Minovici =

Romanian forensic scientist and criminologist (1868–1941)

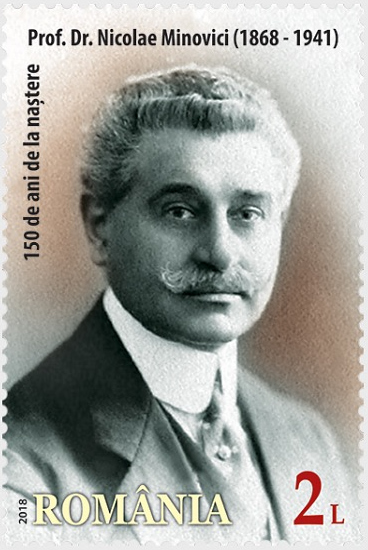
- Born: 23 October 1868; Râmnicu Sărat, Romania
- Died: 26 June 1941 (aged 72); Bucharest, Romania
- Education: Saint Sava National College
- Alma mater: Carol Davila University of Medicine and Pharmacy
- Known for: Research in forensic science, criminology
- Scientific career
- Thesis: Les tatouages en Roumanie (1898)

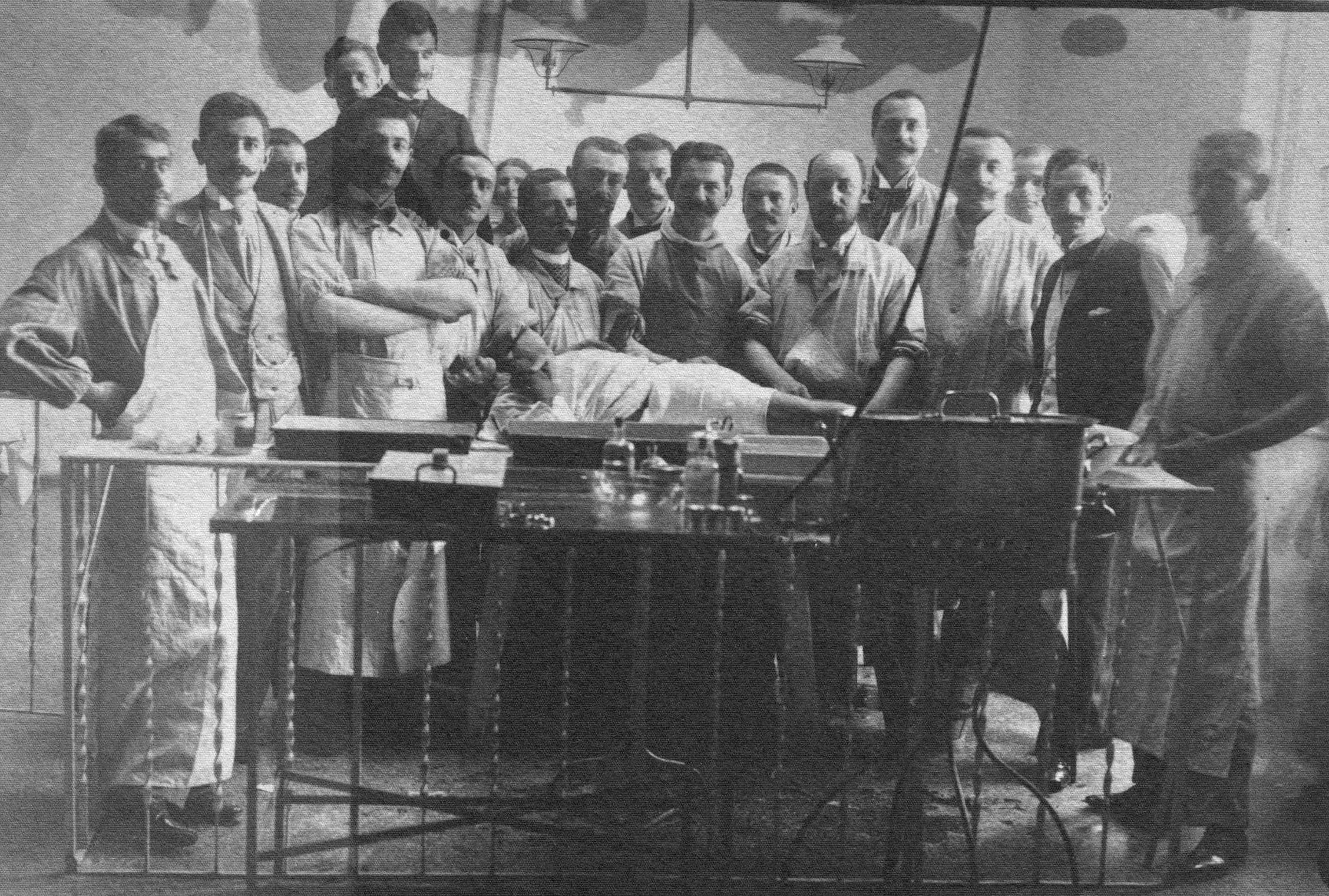
Minovici (center) performing an autopsy, c. 1900. To his left (in dark suit, perched) is anatomist Francisc Rainer, then an intern.

Nicolae S. Minovici (23 October 1868 – 26 June 1941) was a Romanian forensic scientist and criminologist who served as head of his country's anthropometric service. He is known for his studies investigating connections between tattooing and criminal behaviour, as well as his research on hanging and its physiological effects on the human body.

He was the founder of the Legal Medicine Association of Romania and the publisher of the Romanian journal of Legal Medicine. He also served as mayor of Băneasa.

== Early life and education ==
Minovici was born in Râmnicu Sărat on 23 October 1868, into a family of Aromanian origin; he had two older brothers, Mina Minovici and Ștefan Minovici. After going to elementary school in Brăila, he completed his secondary education at Saint Sava High School in Bucharest. He pursued his studies at the Faculty of Medicine, and then he obtained his Ph.D. in forensic science in 1898, with thesis on "Les tatouages en Roumanie" (Tattoos in Romania) which he published next year in Archive des Sciences Médicales. He also took additional courses in psychiatry and pathological anatomy.

== Research ==
His research on the effects of hanging on the human body included performing multiple hanging experiments on himself, each lasting for a period of approximately five seconds. Minovici performed twelve hanging experiments involving himself as the subject. He used a dynamometer attached to a knot which he then tied around his neck and experimented with various positions of the knot around his neck, observing associated phenomena such as vision disturbances, change of skin colouring and ringing in his ears as well as the speed of the onset of these symptoms. He also attempted between six and seven hangings with the assistance of his aides and only experienced pain on the occasion when his feet lost contact with the ground. One of his assistants pulled the rope while loudly counting the time allotted for the experiment.

In the initial experiments the knot was not constricting and his feet were raised two metres above ground. In this configuration, after a progressive series of experiments each lasting longer than its predecessor, he was able to remain hanging for a maximum of twenty five seconds. In his final experiment using a regular, constricting, hangman's knot he was able to stand only for four seconds, before he gave the signal to his aides to stop the experiment. During that experiment his feet had remained in contact with the ground. Nevertheless, he experienced pain, while swallowing, for a month following that experiment.

He also performed choking experiments on volunteers by applying pressure on their carotid arteries and jugular veins for up to five seconds, until the faces of his subjects became red. During their post-experiment accounts, the volunteers recounted experiences such as vision problems, heat sensation in the head, as well as paraesthesias such as a tingling and numbing sensation in multiple places of their bodies.

His research on hanging was published in a 200-page work titled Study on hanging, in two language editions. The Romanian edition was published in 1904 while the French language one was published in 1905.

== Death and legacy ==
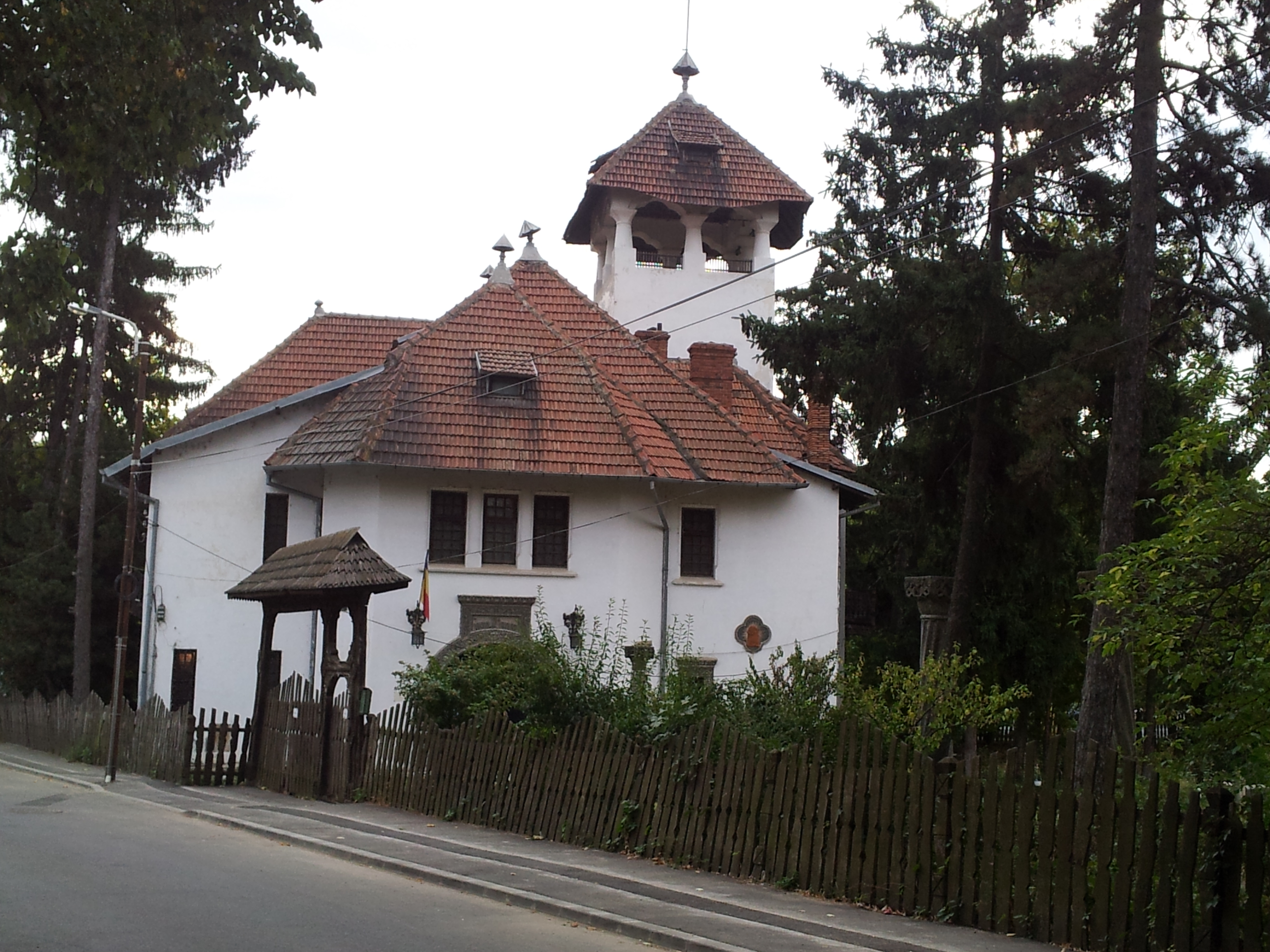
The Minovici Villa in Bucharest

Minovici died in Bucharest in 1941 from an illness affecting his vocal cords. He died a bachelor, bequeathing his estate, including his home, which was built by architect Cristofi Cerchez, and a collection of Romanian folk art, to his country. His home in the Băneasa district of Bucharest is now an ethnological museum, called the Nicolae Minovici Folk Art Museum; the street next to it also bears his name.
