= Popa Nan Church =

Heritage site in Bucharest, Romania

Coordinates: 44°27′53″N 26°09′20″E

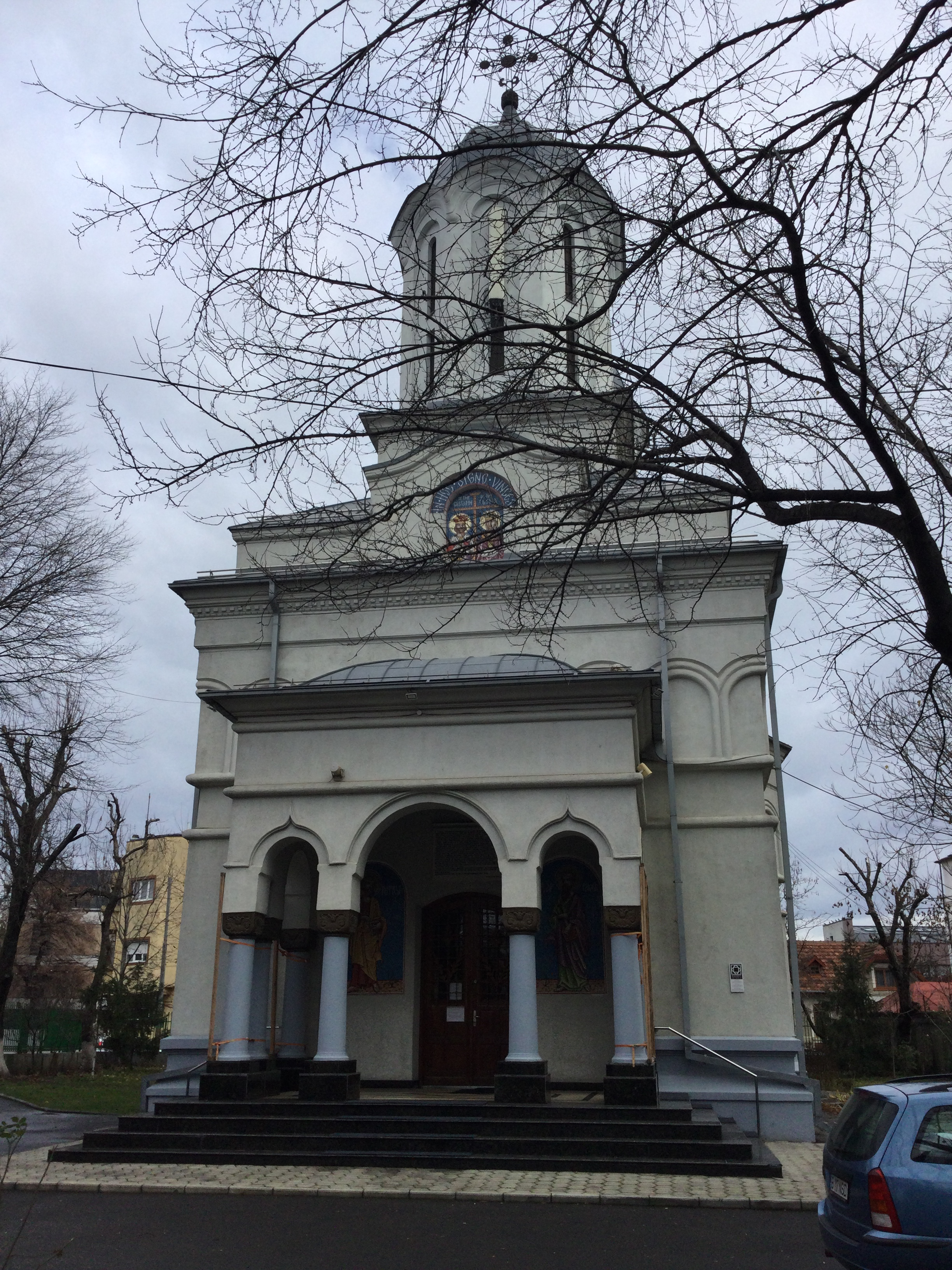
Popa Nan Church

The Popa Nan Church (Romanian: Biserica Popa Nan) is a Romanian Orthodox church located at 47A Popa Nan Street in Bucharest, Romania. It is dedicated to Saints Constantine and Helena.

The first small, single-domed church on the site was built in 1719. A second one, of masonry, probably dated to 1764–1765, as attested by an older pisanie. It underwent repairs in 1802, 1845, 1860 and 1886. In ruins by 1909, it collapsed one night in July 1910. The current church was built from the foundations between 1910 and 1918, with Cristofi Cerchez as architect. The interior frescoes date to 1918–1920. The 1977 earthquake caused serious damage, including the collapse of the nave dome. Repairs lasted until 1986. The interior was repainted from that point until 1988, and the newer artwork features the national tricolor as a motif. In October 1989, Patriarch Teoctist, joined by a large group of priests, rededicated the church.

Fairly large at 28 metres (92 ft) long by 9–14 metres (30–46 ft) wide, the cross-shaped church has apses that are polygonal on the exterior. The substantial narthex has a vaulted ceiling. Two domes sit on square bases: the larger, with twelve sides, above the nave; and the octagonal bell tower on the narthex. The small open porch has three arches, the central one being much larger than those on the sides. The facades are painted in white, with a slightly profiled pediment. There is a series of long, narrow windows on the lower half of the building.

The church is listed as a historic monument by Romania's Ministry of Culture and Religious Affairs.
