= Cristofi Cerchez =

Romanian engineer and architect

- Born: 4 July 1872; Băneasa-Herăstrău, Principality of Romania
- Died: January 15, 1955 (aged 82); Bucharest, Romanian People's Republic
- Occupations: Engineer; Architect
- Years active: 1898–1945
- Notable work: Stătescu Villa; Nicolae Minovici Villa

Cristofi Cerchez (4 July 1872 – 15 January 1955) was a Romanian engineer and architect. He built approximately 50 buildings in various cities of Romania over his nearly 50-year career. His architecture covers a wide range of styles from traditional to eclectic to modern, as well as private, civic and religious edifices. Among the buildings he worked on were the Bucharest Palace of Justice, the State Archives wing of the Mihai Vodă Monastery, the monastery of Vălenii de Munte, and the Nicolae Minovici Folk Art Museum.

== Biography ==
Cristofi Cerchez was born on 4 July 1872, in the village of Băneasa-Herăstrău in the outskirts of Bucharest, in a family of Armenian and Circassian descent. He attended schools in Turnu Măgurele and Alexandria, and then continued his studies in Bucharest, at the Mihai Viteazul Lyceum. In 1894, he graduated from the School of Bridges and Roads and was given a scholarship by Elena Turnescu to continue his studies in Milan. Between 1895 and 1898, Cerchez attended the Polytechnic University of Milan.

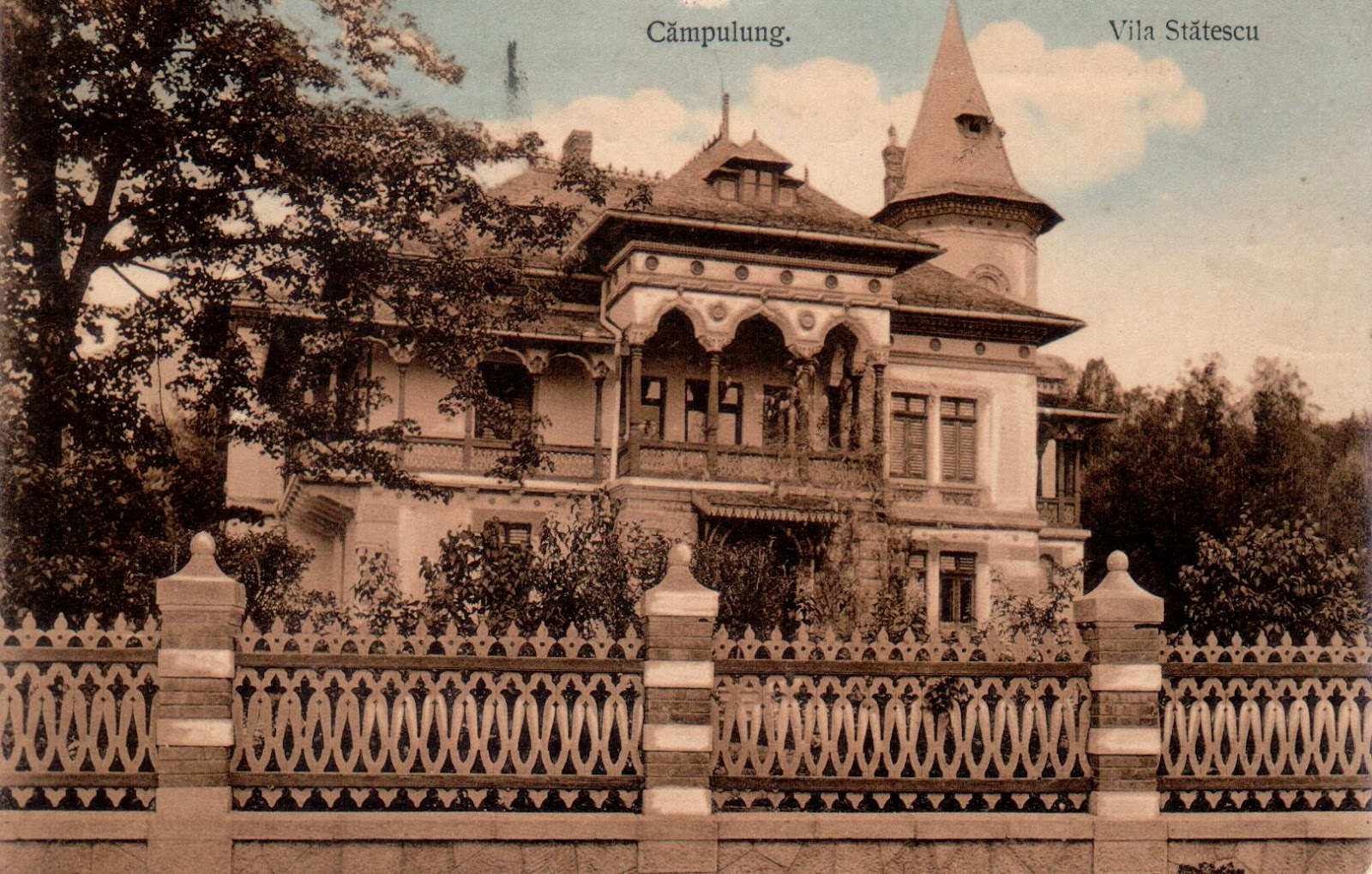
Villa Stătescu in Câmpulung – built 1898 to 1900, photographed in 1911

The first known building designed by Cerchez is the "Stătescu Villa", built in Câmpulung and owned by the liberal politician Eugeniu Stătescu. The building, located at No. 38/43 Lascăr Catargiu Street, was designed and built between 1898 and 1900, though it has had subsequent remodels. In 1918, it was donated by Cecilia Petrescu Stătescu to establish the Eforiei Civil Hospital. "Stătescu Villa" was declared a historic monument and is included on the List of Historical Monuments in 2004 and 2010 as an architectural monument of local importance, with classification code LMI code AG-II-mB-13521.

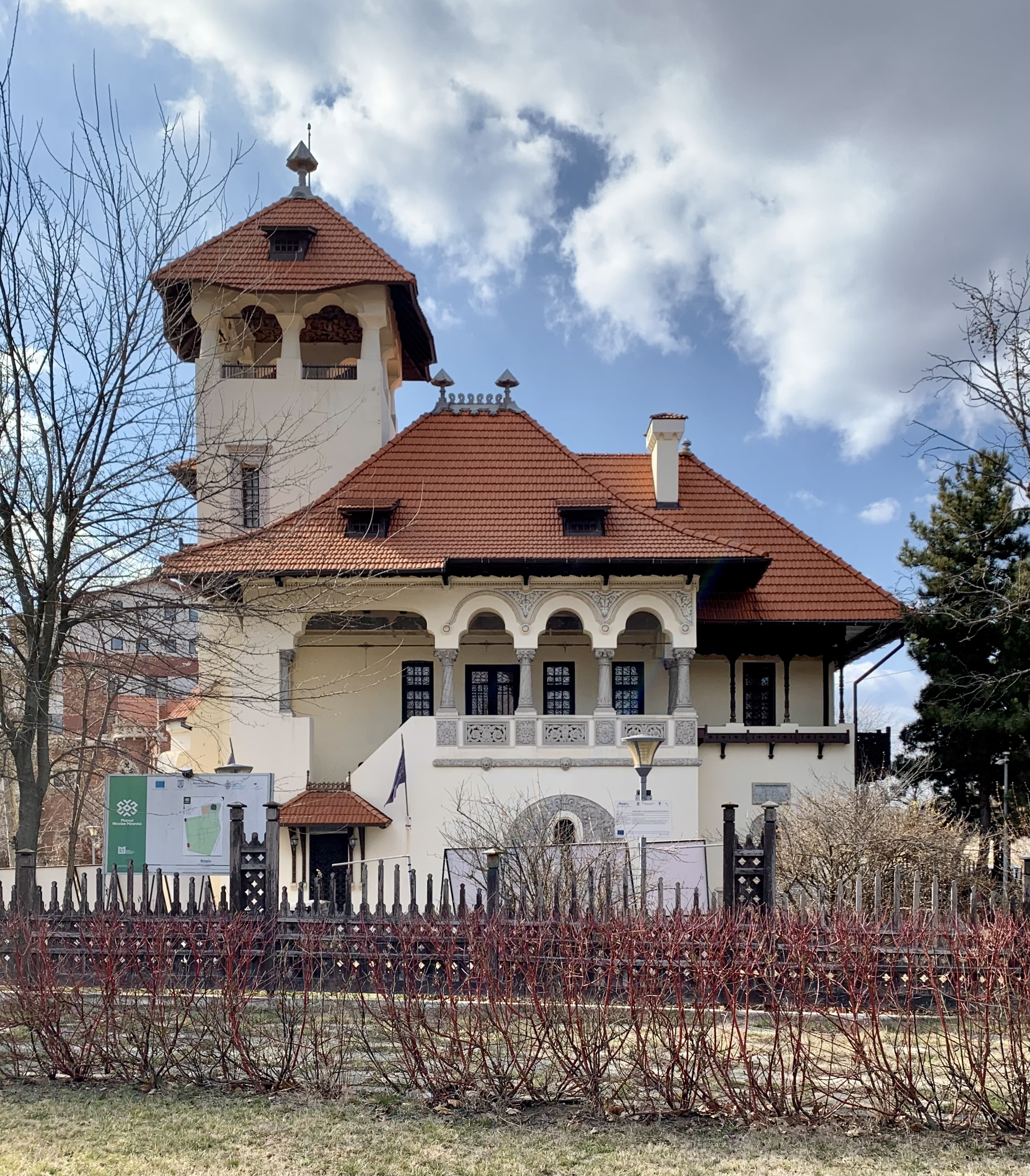
The Minovici Villa, built 1906–1907, now the Nicolae Minovici Folk Art Museum in Băneasa

Between 1900 and 1901, he was employed in the technical service of Constanța. In 1903, Cerchez began designing a house for his friend, Dr. Nicolae Minovici. Minovici wanted something unique to house his large collection of folk art and bought property at the edge of town. In 1904, Cerchez began work on the "first house in the Romanian folk style", which took a year to build. Each room was designed for a specific category of artifact. Cerchez's "Minovici Villa" was built in a style influenced by Ion Mincu's traditional Romanian architecture, but it had sculptural elements reminiscent of Petre Antonescu's style, which soon became very popular with the aristocracy of Bucharest. In 1936, Minovici donated his collections and property to the city of Bucharest. In the deed he specified that it was to be maintained in perpetuity as the Nicolae Minovici Folk Art Museum (Muzeul de Artă Populară "Dr. Nicolae Minovici").

In 1905, Cerchez designed an eclectically styled French villa for M. V. Maximovici at No. 23 Izvor Street, which was demolished in the 1980s. Between 1905 and 1906 he built a school in Ploiești at the request of philanthropist, Zoe Scorțeanu, to honor her son, Alexandru (1859–1899). Cerchez collaborated and worked on the Palace of Justice in Bucharest and for his work was awarded the Royal Patent Prize in 1906. Between 1908 and 1909 he was in charge of architecture for the Ministry of Religious Affairs and supervised work on the State Archives of the Mihai Vodă Monastery. The archives section of the monastery was demolished in 1986.

Four houses that represent the core of Cerchez's style were built between 1911 and 1932 and were inspired by seventeenth century townhouses located in Bucharest, Câmpulung, and Târgoviște. These are the villa built for Micu Zentler in 1911 at No. 8 Mântuleasa Street (now No. 10); a villa located at No. 19-21 Modrogan Alley built for Sofia Candiano-Popescu (1911); the "Stanovici Villa" built in 1914 at No. 6 Remus Street; and the "Villa Eufrosinei Mătăsaru" at No. 12 Porumbaru Street, built in 1932.

Between 1914 and 1918 he built several more villas and after World War I, worked on restoration projects and civic works. One was a restoration with the architect Toma Dobrescu to restore the Sturdza Palace which was being used as the headquarters of the Ministry of Foreign Affairs. Another project, for which he won a project design award in 1925, was a town hall inspired by Turnul Colței. The building plan was curtailed by the Great Depression. This period between the wars brought a noticeable change to his style, as he focused more on modernist buildings.

In addition to personal residences and civic buildings, Cerchez worked on several church properties. In Bucharest, he restored the Popa Nan Church in 1910, built the Vicarage of Biserica Sfinții Apostoli (Apostle's Church) between 1926 and 1927, and worked on the Mântuleasa Church. In Alexandria, he worked on the Church of the Apostles and the Saint Alexander Cathedral. After 1940, he worked on the monastery of Vălenii de Munte.

Cerchez died on 15 January 1955.

== Legacy ==
In 2012, the Art History Association printed two maps and led tours to some of Cerchez's buildings in an effort to bring awareness to his work. Art Conservation Support also published a book, Cristofi Cerchez, un vechiu arhitect din București, by Oana Marinache, an art historian, with photographs and notes on his architectural vision and contributions to Romanian architecture.
