= Nicolae Bălcescu National College =

High school in Brăila, Romania

- Colegiul Național Nicolae Bălcescu
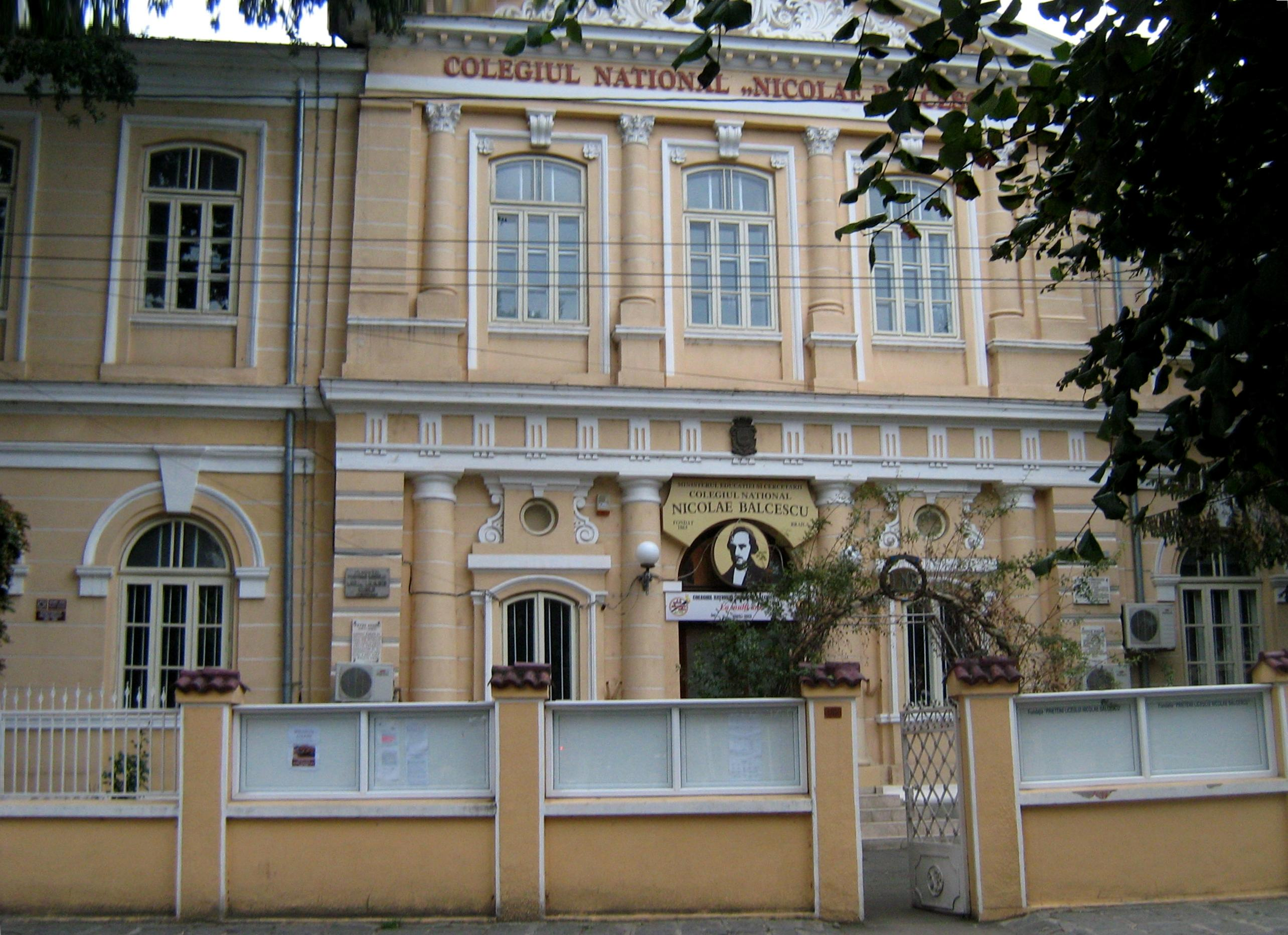

Location
- Bulevardul Alexandru Ioan Cuza, Nr. 182; Brăila, Brăila County; Romania
- Coordinates: 45.2748°N 27.9697°E

Information
- School type: High school
- Established: 1863
- Website: cnnb.ro

Nicolae Bălcescu National College (Romanian: Colegiul Național Nicolae Bălcescu) is a high school located at 182 Alexandru Ioan Cuza Boulevard, Brăila, Romania.

== History ==
The school traces its origins to 1863, when it was founded as a Realschule with two grades. It became a four-year classical gymnasium in 1867, with a fifth grade added for students wishing to pursue a business career. Another change in 1871 turned the institution into a four-year commercial school. This lasted until 1873, when the city gymnasium was inaugurated. The national government took over in 1880; within three years, all grades offered science courses. The 1888 addition of a fifth grade made it into a real high school, the country's first. In 1895, the school was dedicated to Nicolae Bălcescu.

In 1900, the school received the gymnasium classes from another high school, while its upper grades were transferred to that school. Thus, it was once again a gymnasium until 1906, when the decision was reversed. In 1916, when Romania entered World War I, seven teachers were sent to the front, while the building became a hospital for the wounded and classes were suspended. These resumed in October 1918, under difficult conditions. The interwar period saw a steady rise in enrollment.

A 1948 reform by the new communist regime left only 11 grades in place. Between 1954 and 1959, the Bălcescu name was dropped. Meanwhile, girls were first admitted in 1956. A bust of Bălcescu was placed in front of the school and unveiled in 1967. Students and teachers alike closely followed the Romanian Revolution of 1989. The following December, for the first time in decades, the tradition of celebrating the school's spiritual patron, Saint Nicholas, was revived. A gymnasium class was introduced in 1995; there were four by 1999. The school was declared a national college in 1996.

== Building ==
In its first twenty-three years, the school had no fixed abode, moving six times around five different houses. These were inadequate to its purpose; one had a bar on the ground floor, while another was the upper floor of a girls’ school. A permanent building was begun in 1885 on empty land donated by the city; Alexandru Săvulescu was the architect. Later that year, negligence caused a fire that destroyed the structure. Work began again in 1886, reaching completion in October. The building was subsequently dedicated in the presence of Education Minister Dimitrie Sturdza.

Due to damage sustained during World War I, classes were held in primary schools until January 1919, and repairs were not finalized until 1924. The 1940 Vrancea earthquake caused serious damage, with repairs carried out the following year. In April 1944, a Wehrmacht hospital opened inside, causing fresh deterioration. It was then a Red Army hospital for two weeks. The interior was repaired with great effort, so that courses resumed on November 1. From the close of the 1944–1945 academic year until the end of September 1945, the school building and dormitory were once again a Soviet hospital. Serious cracks appeared as a result of the 1977 Vrancea earthquake, requiring further repairs. The old wing was restored in 2004–2005. The school building is listed as a historic monument by Romania's Ministry of Culture and Religious Affairs.

== Alumni ==
- Petre Andrei
- Anton Bacalbașa
- Virgil I. Bărbat
- Nicolae Carandino
- Panait Cerna
- Mihail Crama
- Mihu Dragomir
- Leon Feraru
- Mina Minovici
- Ștefan Minovici
- Gheorghe Munteanu-Murgoci
- Cezar Papacostea
- Perpessicius
- Ștefan Petică
- Gheorghe Petrașcu
- Mihail Polihroniade
- Radu R. Rosetti
- Constantin Sandu-Aldea
- Eugen Schileru
- Mihail Sebastian
- Anastase Simu
- Ion Theodorescu-Sion
- Andrei Tudor
- Victor Vâlcovici
- Cristian Vasile
