= Ștefan Minovici =

Romanian chemist

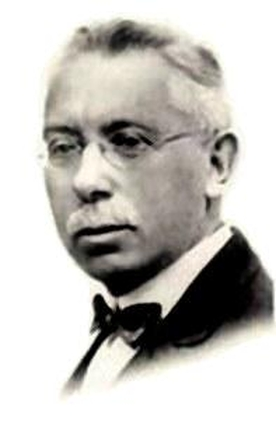
- Born: July 18, 1867; Râmnicu Sărat, Kingdom of Romania
- Died: December 29, 1935 (aged 68); Pitești, Kingdom of Romania
- Citizenship: Romania
- Education: University of Bucharest; Humboldt University of Berlin
- Scientific career
- Workplaces: Carol Davila University of Medicine and Pharmacy; University of Bucharest

Ștefan Minovici (July 18, 1867 – December 29, 1935) was a Romanian chemist.

The brother of Mina Minovici and Nicolae Minovici, he became a corresponding member of the Romanian Academy in 1925.

== Education ==
Minovici was born in Râmnicu Sărat into a family of Aromanian origin. After studying at the gymnasium in Brăila from 1875 to 1882, he moved to Bucharest, where he completed his high school studies at Saint Sava National College in 1887. He then enrolled in the Faculty of Sciences at the University of Bucharest, majoring in physics and chemistry, and received a B.S. in 1893. The year after he went to study at Friedrich Wilhelm University in Berlin under Emil Fischer, graduating in 1897.

== Career ==
In 1899 Minovici joined the faculty at the Faculty of Medicine and Pharmacy in Bucharest. In 1912 he was promoted to full professor at the University of Bucharest, while in 1925 he became director of the Institute of Organic Chemistry at the university. At that time he founded the Society of Chemistry in Romania, which became the official body representing Romania within the Paris-based International Union of Pure and Applied Chemistry.

Minovici died suddenly on December 29, 1935, in Pitești of a cerebral hemorrhage.

== Publications ==
- Minovici, Ștefan (1907), Manualul Teoretic și Practic de Chimie Analitică (Analiza Calitativă), București: Institutul de Arte Grafice și Editură "Minerva"
- Minovici, Ștefan (1910), Manualul Teoretic și Practic de Chimie Analitică (Analiza Cantitativa), vol. II, București: Institutul de Arte Grafice și Editură "Minerva"
- Minovici, Ștefan; Vanghelovici, Mihail (1934). "Contributions to our knowledge of cholesterol". Journal of Chemical Education. 11 (12). American Chemical Society (ACS): 637. Bibcode:1934JChEd..11..637M. doi:10.1021/ed011p637. ISSN 0021-9584.
