= Vera Călin =

Vera Călin (born Vera Clejan; 17 February 1921, Bucharest, Romania - December 2013, Los Angeles) was a Romanian-born American literary critic, literary historian, essayist and translator.

== Biography ==
Born into a Jewish family (her father, Herman Clejan, an architect, was the one who designed the Lafayette Galleries in Bucharest, present-day Victoria Department Store), Vera Călin was forced due to the antisemitic laws to go to Jewish schools. She graduated from the Department of Letters and Philosophy of the University of Bucharest in 1946.

She made her literary debut in the summer of 1944 in the daily "Ecoul". After World War II, she worked for a while as a copy editor for the publishing house "Editura de stat pentru literatură și artă" (ESPLA).

At the University of Bucharest, she taught in the beginning English language courses, and later courses in world and comparative literature, becoming a full professor in 1970.

Between 1977 and 1978 she was a visiting professor at a university in Jerusalem.

According to literary critic Mircea Martin, Vera Călin belongs to the group of members of the illegal Communist Party or its sympathizers (during World War II) who have tried not only to "relink with the internal traditions, but also with the European tradition and the whole world, both in the literary field and in the realm of ideas."

She was married to a physician, with whom she had two sons. After the husband's death in 1975, she emigrated to the US to her younger son in 1976.

She died in Los Angeles, California, in December 2013.

== Selected works ==
=== Books ===
- Furtuna în cancelarie, a play, 1956 (with Silvian Iosifescu)
- Pornind de la clasici, 1957
- Byron, Ed. de stat, 1961
- Curentele literare și evocarea istorică, Editura pentru literatură, București, 1963
- Metamorfozele măștilor comice, Editura pentru literatură, București, 1966
- Alegoria și esențele, Editura pentru literatură universală, București, 1969 (translation from German "Auferstellung der Allegorie", Vienna, 1975)
- Romantismul, Editura Univers, București, 1970
- Omisiunea elocventă, Editura enciclopedică română, București, 1973
- Prea târziu: Însemnări californiene, Editura Univers, București, 1997
- Post-scriptum. Însemnări 1997-2002, Inst. Cultural Român, București, 2004

=== Translations ===
- Cui îi bate ceasul, (For Whom the Bell Tolls by Ernest Hemingway) (în Viitorul, 1944?)
- Călătoriile lui Gulliver, (Gulliver's Travels), 1947
- Hamlet, ESPLA (with Maria Banuș)
- Jude Neștiutul, (Jude the Obscure by Thomas Hardy), Ed. Paralela 45, 2002

== Sources ==
- Vera Călin- o emigrație, Supplement to Observatorul cultural, 25 May 2006
- Al. Mirodan, Dicționar neconvențional al scriitorilor evrei de limb română, Minimum, 1986
- Encyclopaedia Judaica
