= Mina Minovici =

Romanian forensic scientist

- Born: April 30, 1858; Brăila, Wallachia
- Died: April 25, 1933 (aged 74); Bucharest, Kingdom of Romania
- Resting place: Bellu Cemetery, Bucharest
- Citizenship: Romania
- Education: Carol Davila University of Medicine and Pharmacy; University of Paris
- Scientific career
- Workplaces: Carol Davila University of Medicine and Pharmacy; University of Bucharest
- Thesis: Etude médico-légale sur la mort subite à la suite de coups sur l'abdomen et le larynx (1888)
- Doctoral advisor: Paul Brouardel

Mina Minovici (Romanian pronunciation: [ˈmina ˈminovit͡ʃʲ]; April 30, 1858 – April 25, 1933) was a Romanian forensic scientist, known for his extensive research regarding cadaverous alkaloids, putrefaction, simulated mind diseases, and criminal anthropology.

== Studies ==
Minovici's doctoral thesis

He was born in Brăila into a family of Aromanian origin, older brother of Ștefan Minovici and Nicolae Minovici.

After graduating from the Superior School of Pharmacy he worked as pharmacist for the Eforie Civilian Hospitals. He then attended the Carol Davila University of Medicine and Pharmacy in Bucharest, graduating in 1885. Right after that he started his forensic training at the University of Paris with Professor Paul Brouardel, and soon after he became his assistant and advisee. Minovici defended his Ph.D. thesis, titled Etude médico-légale sur la mort subite à la suite de coups sur l'abdomen et le larynx, on June 7, 1888.

== Career ==
In 1889 Minovici was appointed assistant in the Chemistry Department at University of Medicine and Pharmacy in Bucharest. In 1892 he became Director of the Institute of Forensic Medicine in Bucharest. Inaugurated on December 20 of that year, the institute was the first of his kind in the world. The city of Bucharest spent 87,000 lei, and the Romanian government allocated an additional 50,000 lei for the building, which was designed by architect Cristofi Cerchez. The old National Institute of Forensic Medicine "Mina Minovici" was demolished in 1985, while the new headquarters of the Institute were completed in 1989.

In 1896 Minovici became a professor of forensics at the University of Bucharest's Faculty of Law. In 1919 he was elected Dean of the University of Medicine and Pharmacy, being renewed in this position in 1923, 1925 and 1930.

In 1923, together with the poet Radu D. Rosetti and the politician Grigore Trancu-Iași, he founded Nirvana Society (later Cenușa, "The Ash"), which operated the Bucharest Crematorium.

He died in Bucharest on April 25, 1933 and was buried at Bellu Cemetery.

== Legacy ==
Minovici was the founder of the modern medico-legal system in Romania, and was one of the most prominent personalities in this field of activity in Europe at that time. He was the first to expand the concept of the morgue and created the term "legal medicine" as a way of organizing research, teaching and forensic activity.

The year 2008 was declared the "Mina Minovici Year" in Romanian medicine; this was prompted by a triple anniversary: 150 years from his birth, 120 years from the defense of his thesis and election as member of the French Society of Forensic Medicine, and 75 years from his death.
