= Mântuleasa Church =

Orthodox church in Bucharest, Romania

Coordinates: 44°26′07″N 26°06′48″E

- Biserica Mântuleasa
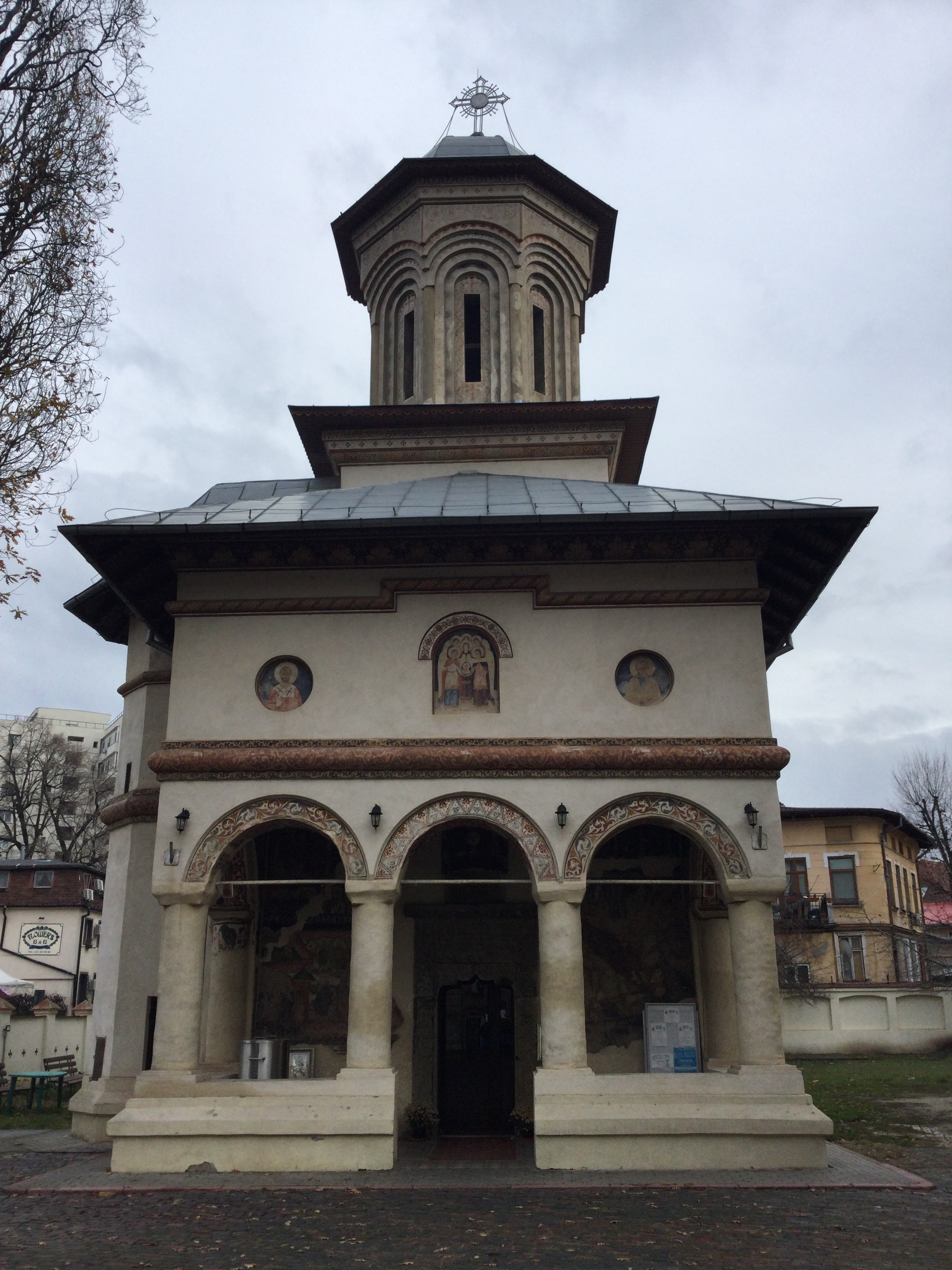
- Mântuleasa Church
- Address: 20 Mântuleasa Street
- Country: Romania
- Denomination: Romanian Orthodox

History
- Founded: 1734
- Dedication: Archangels Michael and Gabriel

Architecture
- Completed: 1733

Specifications
- Length: 22 metres (72 ft)
- Width: 10 metres (33 ft)
- Height: 18 metres (59 ft)
- Materials: Brick, stone

The Mântuleasa Church (Romanian: Biserica Mântuleasa) is a Romanian Orthodox church located at 20 Mântuleasa Street in Bucharest, Romania. It is dedicated to the Archangels Michael and Gabriel.

The church is named after the street on which it stands, which in turn derives from a wealthy merchant, Manta, who owned land in the area. It was built by his sister Maria and his wife Stanca, according to the pisanie of 1733. For a time, it was enlarged by closing the portico and adding another in front. The dome, which fell during an earthquake, was provisionally replaced by one of wood. It was restored to its original form between 1924 and 1930.

The church is small, 22 metres (72 ft) long by 7.7 to 10 metres (25 to 33 ft) wide, with the dome rising to 18 metres (59 ft). Cross-shaped, it is covered in tin and has a long gutter. The portico has three arches in the main facade and one on each side; these rest on massive cylindrical columns of painted brick. The octagonal dome, with narrow windows, sits on a square base above the elongated narthex. The interior Byzantine frescoes came to light when the walls were washed in 1925. Their color and style places them in the Brâncovenesc period. The masonry facades are divided into two sections by a painted row. An icon of the patron saints sits in a recess above the entrance, flanked by paintings of Saints Nicholas and Stylianos.

The church is listed as a historic monument by Romania's Ministry of Culture and Religious Affairs, as is the parish house.
