= Carol Davila University of Medicine and Pharmacy =

University in Bucharest, Romania

Coordinates: 44°26′4.63″N 26°4′10.59″E

- Universitatea de Medicină și Farmacie „Carol Davila”
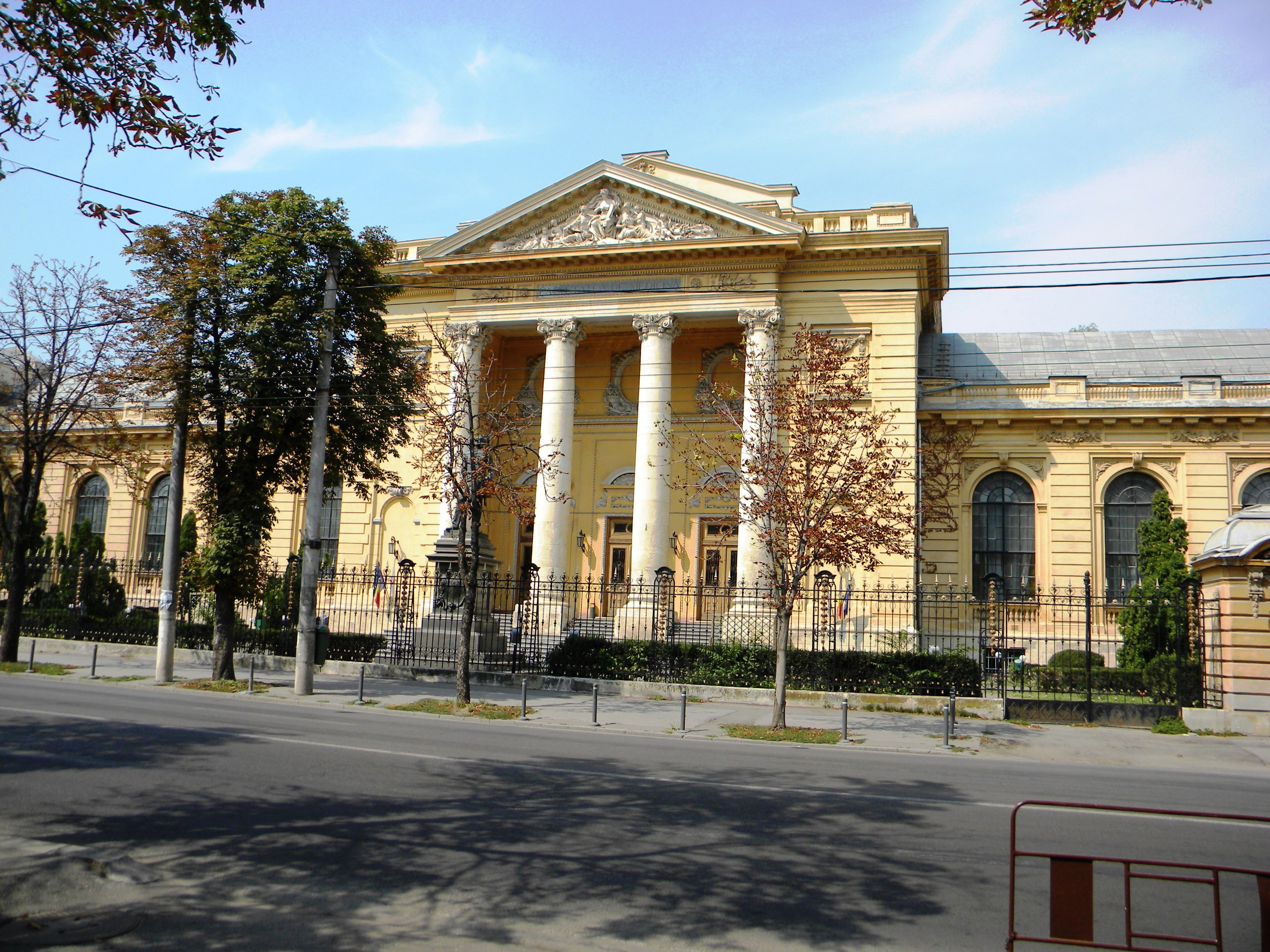
- Other names: UMFCD, UMPCD, CDUMP
- Former names: Institute of Medicine and Pharmacy of Bucharest (1948–1991)
- Motto: Virtute et sapientia (Latin: "By virtue and wisdom")
- Type: Public
- Established: 12 November 1869; 156 years ago - Faculty of Medicine of Bucharest; 1857 - National School of Medicine and Pharmacy
- Academic affiliations: International Association of Universities, European University Association
- Rector: Viorel Jinga
- President of the Senate: Dragoș Vinereanu
- Academic staff: 1,654
- Students: 10,400 (2019–2020)
- Location: 8, Eroii Sanitari Blvd, Bucharest, Romania
- Campus: Urban
- Colors: Gold, white, & navy blue
- Website: umfcd.ro

Carol Davila University of Medicine and Pharmacy (Romanian: Universitatea de Medicină și Farmacie „Carol Davila”) or University of Medicine and Pharmacy Bucharest, commonly known by the abbreviation UMFCD, is a public health sciences university in Bucharest, Romania. It is one of the largest and oldest institutions of its kind in Romania. The university uses the facilities of over 20 clinical hospitals all over Bucharest.

The Carol Davila University is classified as an "advanced research and education university" by the Ministry of Education. Created as part of the University of Bucharest in 1869, the institution is considered one of the most prestigious of its kind in Romania and in Eastern Europe.

== Library ==
The university includes two major libraries, both built in 1869 in a neoclassical and neo-baroque style.

== History ==
Carol Davila was a prestigious Romanian physician of Italian ancestry. He studied medicine at the University of Paris, graduating in February 1853. In March 1853, he arrived in Romania. He was the organiser of the military medical service for the Romanian Army and of the country's public health system.

In 1857, Davila, in collaboration with Nicolae Kretzulescu, founded the university, at which time it was known under the name of the National School of Medicine and Pharmacy. In the same year, the foundation stone of the University Palace in Bucharest was laid. It was due to Carol Davila's many activities that several scientific associations appeared in Romania: the Medical Society (1857), the Red Cross Society (1876), and the Natural Sciences Society (1876). With his assistance, two medical journals entered print: the Medical Register (1862) and the Medical Gazette (1865).

On 12 November 1869, it was established the Faculty of Medicine of Bucharest, incorporated in the University of Bucharest. The first doctoral degrees were granted in 1873, and the doctoral degree became the de facto graduation in 1888.

The Nobel Prize in Physiology or Medicine was awarded to George Emil Palade, described as "the most influential cell biologist ever", who had studied at the University of Carol Davila and later served as a Professor and Head of the Department of Human Biology and Physiology.

The School of Pharmacy was founded in 1889 as part of the Faculty of Medicine. In 1923, it was separated and it became the Faculty of Pharmacy.

The Faculty of Pharmacy of Carol Davila University is the place where insulin was isolated for the first time by Nicolae Paulescu in 1921, leading to a controversy in the awarding of the 1923 Nobel Prize in physiology or medicine.

In 1948, the Faculties of Medicine and Pharmacy were separated from the University of Bucharest, and incorporated as the Institute of Medicine and Pharmacy. In the same year, the postgraduate Clinical Dentistry Institute was incorporated into the Institute of Medicine and Pharmacy as the Faculty of Dentistry.

In 1991, the Institute of Medicine and Pharmacy changed its name to the Carol Davila University of Medicine and Pharmacy.

== Ranking ==
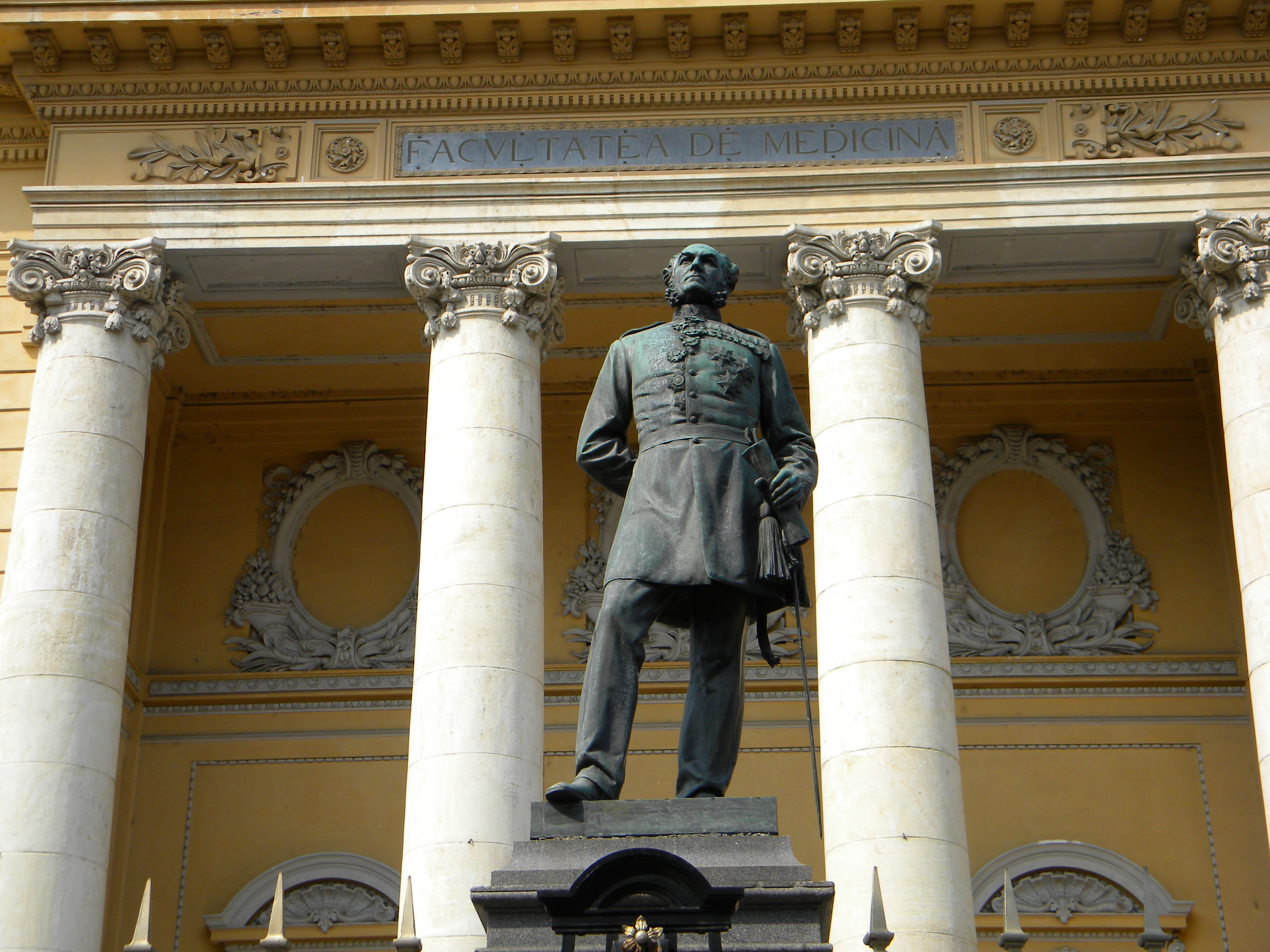
The Palace of the Faculty of Medicine in Bucharest

According to the Scimago Lab, based on data collected between 2007 and 2011, Carol Davila University of Medicine and Pharmacy ranked 121 regionally and 12 in the country by number of publications. According to the International Journal of Medical Sciences, in a 2019 survey UMFCD along with Karolinska Institute, Erasmus University, and Paris Descartes University are considered Europe's medical universities that are leading change. Based on the Shanghai Ranking, the Carol Davila University of Medicine and Pharmacy lies among the top 101–150 Universities in the “medical sciences” domain with regards to the subject "clinical medicine”.

In 2025, according to the prestigious international ranking University Ranking by Academic Performance (URAP), the Carol Davila University of Medicine and Pharmacy in Bucharest ranks first among universities in Romania (774th worldwide, compared to 787th in 2024), standing out not only among Romanian medical universities but also among all higher education institutions in the country.

== Faculties ==
- Faculty of Medicine
- Faculty of Pharmacy
- Faculty of Dentistry

=== Faculty of Medicine ===
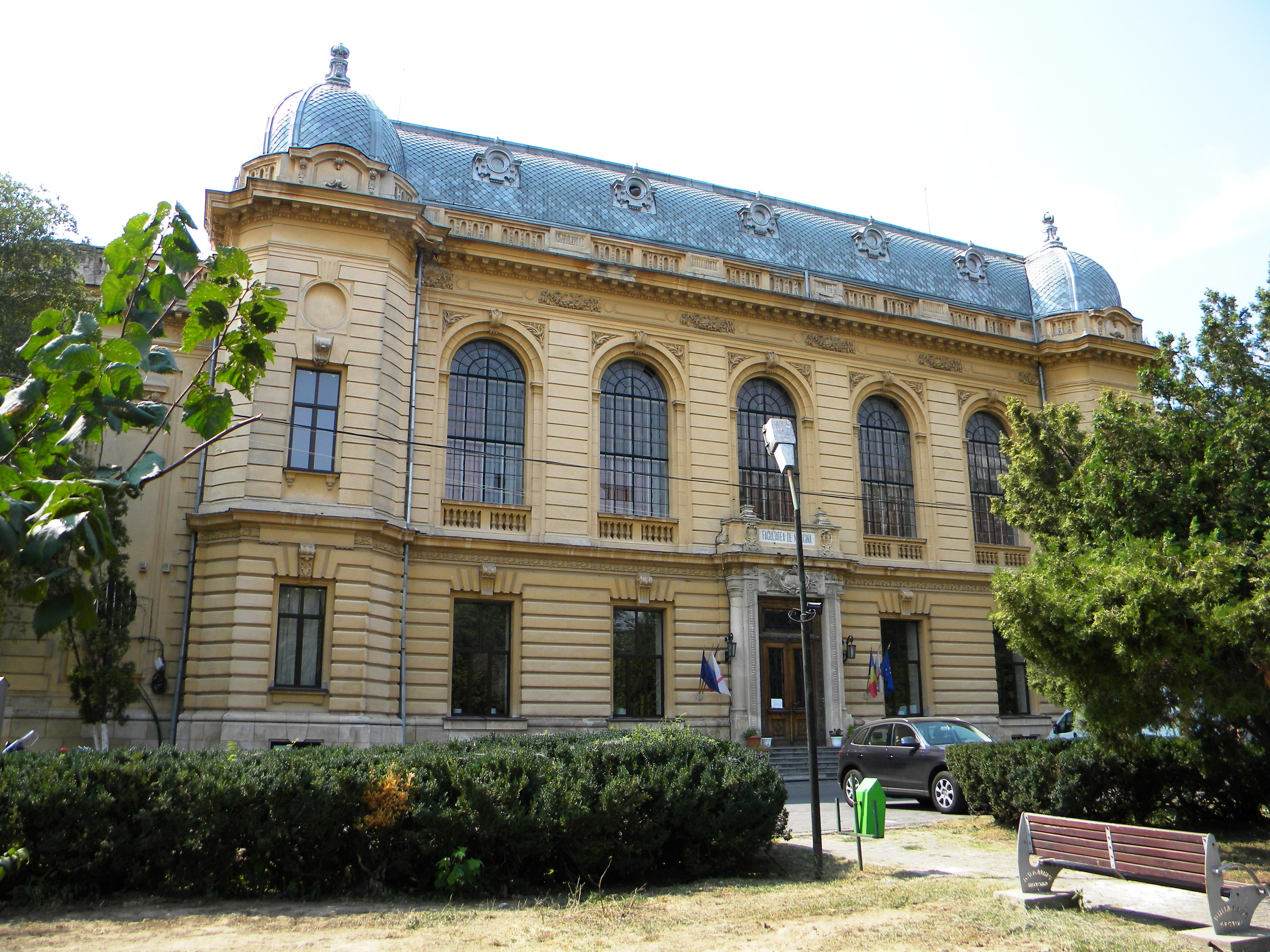
University of Medicine and Pharmacy

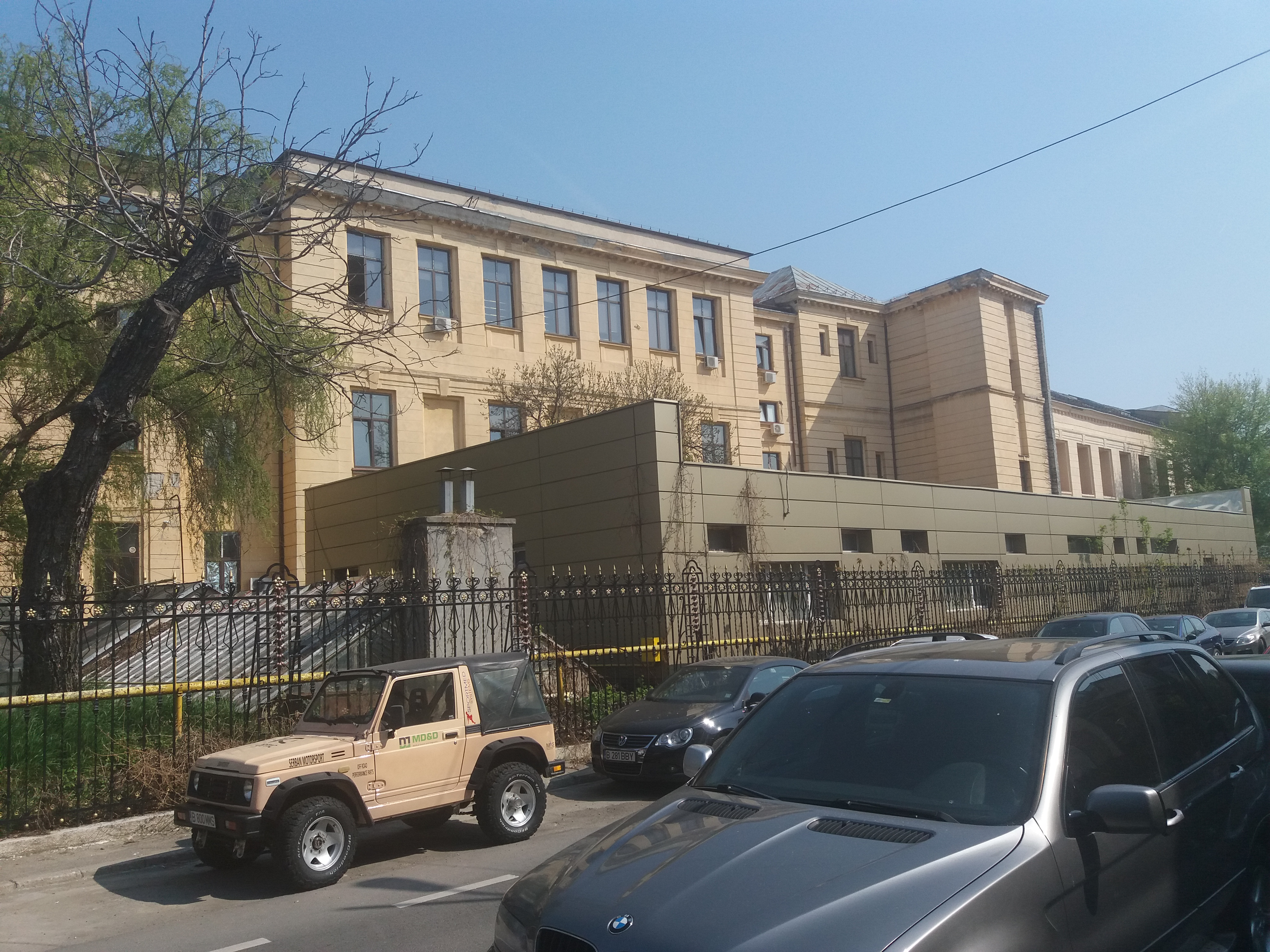
Entrance of the University

The higher medical and pharmaceutical education in Bucharest dates back more than a century. Carol Davila, a Romanian physician of Italian origin, in collaboration with Nicholae Kretzulescu founded the Medical education in Romania, by establishing the National School of Medicine and Pharmacy in 1857. Thanks to his activity a number of scientific societies were created, such as the Medical Society, the Red Cross Society and the Natural Sciences Society, and two medical journals, The Medical Monitor and The Medical Gazette.

The building of the Faculty of Medicine was fully completed and inaugurated on 12 October 1903. The initiative to erect a monument to Carol Davila on the same day, was taken at the first national medical conference, which was held in Bucharest in October 1884. The statue, valued work of Carol Storck, was cast in bronze in the School of arts and crafts workshops in Bucharest.

The inauguration of the faculty building is an important date in the evolution of medical education in Bucharest. The new building brought great improvements in the functioning of laboratories and the organization of practical work, as well as in the full didactic activity. In the faculty building there is a fully organized sports center that includes an autonomous indoor swimming pool for the university's representative successful team and in addition an indoor basketball, volleyball and handball court.

==== Departments ====
- Pathophysiology and Immunology
- Genetics
- Internal Medicine and Nephrology
- Internal Medicine and Gastroenterology
- Internal Medicine and Rheumatology
- Medical Expertise and Work Capacity Recovery
- Internal Medicine
- Cardiology
- Internal Medicine and Cardiology
- Allergology
- Medical - Surgical Care Practice
- General Nursing
- Neuro - Psychomotor Children Recovery
- Recovery, Physical Education, Balneology
- Family Medicine
- Endocrinology
- Biochemistry
- Medical Informatics and Biostatistics
- History of Medicine
- Marketing and Medical Technology
- Legal Medicine and Bioethics
- Cardiovascular Surgery
- Thoracic Surgery
- Dermatology
- Oncological Dermatology and Allergology
- Hygiene and Medical Ecology
- Public Health and Management
- Diabetes, Nutrition and Metabolic Diseases
- Geriatrics and Gerontology
- Pneumophysiology
- Anesthesia and Intensive Therapy
- Surgery
- Neurosurgery
- General and Esophageal Surgery
- Anesthesia and Intensive Therapy
- Pharmacology, Toxicology and Clinical Psychopharmacology
- Nephrology
- Urology
- Urological Surgery
- Transplantation Immunology
- Orthopaedics
- Orthopaedics and Traumatology
- Plastic and Reconstructive Surgery
- Plastic Surgery, Children Reconstructive Surgery
- Pediatric Neurology
- Occupational Medicine
- Child and Adolescent Psychiatry
- Medical Psychology
- Infectious and Tropical Diseases
- Virusology
- Epidemiology
- Microbiology
- Parasitology
- Obstetrics and Gynecology
- Hematology
- Pediatrics
- O.R.L.
- Ophthalmology
- Radiology, Medical Imaging, Nuclear Medicine
- Oncology
- Radiotherapy and Oncology
- Biophysics
- Cellular and Molecular Medicine
- Pharmacology and Pharmacotherapy
- Anatomy
- Psychiatry
- Pathological Anatomy

=== Faculty of Pharmacy ===
The Faculty of Pharmacy was created in 1858.

==== Departments ====
- Analytical Chemistry
- Inorganic Chemistry
- Medications Control
- Organic Chemistry
- Clinical Laboratory
- Medical Emergency
- Botanic Pharmacy and Cellular Biology
- Clinical Pharmacy
- Phytochemistry and Phytotherapy
- Biochemistry
- General and Pharmaceutical Microbiology
- Toxicology
- Medical Pedagogy
- Technical Pharmaceutics

=== Faculty of Dentistry ===
==== Departments ====
- Clinical and Topografic Anatomy
- Anatomy and Embryology
- Internal Medicine
- Paediatrics
- Neurology
- O.R.L.
- Ophthalmology
- Surgery and Anesthesiology
- Obstetrics
- Pathologic Anatomy
- Infectious Diseases
- Dermatology
- Endocrinology
- Pathophysiology and Immunology
- Hygiene

== Notable alumni ==
- Aurel Babeș (1886–1962), Romanian scientist, one of the discoverers of the screening test for cervical cancer
- Adriana G. Ioachimescu
- Sorin Lavric (born 1967), Romanian writer, philosopher and politician
- Mina Minovici (1858–1933), Romanian forensic scientist
- Filip Mișea (1873–1944), Aromanian activist, physician and politician
- George Emil Palade (1912–2008), 1974 Nobel Prize in Physiology or Medicine and United States National Medal of Science in 1986
- Nicolae Paulescu (1869–1931), Romanian physiologist, professor of medicine, politician, discovered insulin
