= Grigore T. Popa =

Romanian physician and public intellectual (1892–1948)

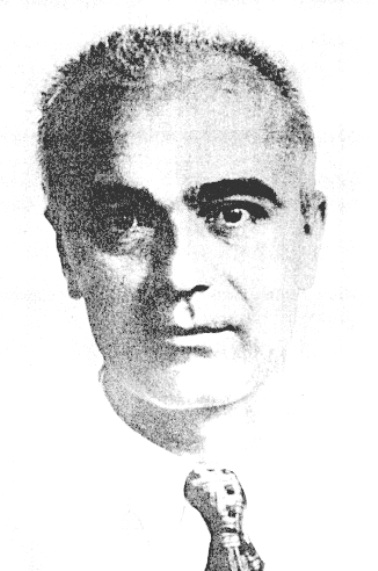
- Born: May 1, 1892; Șurănești, Vaslui County
- Died: July 18, 1948 (aged 56); Bucharest
- Other name: Gregor T. Popa
- Education: University of Iași
- Known for: research into the hypophyseal portal system
- Children: Tudorel Popa
- Scientific career
- Fields: Morphology; Endocrinology; Neuromorphology
- Workplaces: Sfântul Spiridon Hospital; University of Bucharest; University of Iași
- Academic advisors: Nicolae Hortolomei, Francisc Rainer
- Notable students: Constantin Bălăceanu-Stolnici, George Emil Palade

Grigore T. Popa (sometimes Anglicized to Gregor T. Popa; 1 May 1892 – 18 July 1948) was a Romanian physician and public intellectual. Of lowly peasant origin, he managed to obtain a university education and become a professor at two of his country's leading universities. An anatomist by specialty, Popa worked on popularizing modern science, reforming the medical and higher education systems, and, in war hospitals, as a decorated and publicly acclaimed practitioner. His work in endocrinology and neuromorphology was valued abroad, while at home he helped train a generation of leading doctors.

Ill-treated by successive fascist dictatorships, Popa adhered to moderate left-wing ideals and publicized them by means of his review, Însemnări Ieșene. He criticized Marxism as much as scientific racism, but condemned Romania's participation in the war against the Soviets, and, in 1944, joined a protest movement of high-profile academics. During his final years, his anticommunism and his Christian democratic stances brought him into conflict with the authorities. The Communist Romanian regime drove him out of his teaching position and harassed him until his death in middle age. Upon the restoration of democracy, his alma mater and the school where he taught for much of his career was named in his honor.

== Biography ==
=== Origins and early career ===
Born in Șurănești, Vaslui County, his parents Maria and Toader were poor răzeși, peasants who owned their own plot of land. The family was related to Emil Condurachi, future historian and archeologist. Grigore, the couple's eleventh child, was intellectually precocious. His mother noticed his aptitude early on, and despite great material difficulties, including selling off their land so he could finish high school, his parents managed to provide him with an education. As argued by historian Lucian Boia, Popa's lowly origin and his successful career stand as evidence of an "upward social mobility" in the pre-1944 Kingdom of Romania.

Raised a Romanian Orthodox, Popa blended his belief in core Christian principles with an interest in science. At the age of fifteen, he translated Ernst Haeckel's General Morphology into Romanian and obtained the author's written permission to publish. He would later translate Gray's Anatomy as well. Popa graduated from the National College in Iași and entered the Natural Sciences faculty of the local university. However, as his parents had no more money for his schooling and there were no scholarships left, he switched to the Medical faculty, where there was one scholarship, even though the field did not attract him.

Upon seeing cadavers being dissected for the first time, he fainted and had to be revived with cold water by an assistant. However, he persevered in his studies and was helped in particular by two professors, Nicolae Hortolomei and Francisc Rainer, becoming the latter's assistant after graduation. As later noted by surgeon Ilie Th. Riga, who was his colleague on Rainer's team, "we lived for years in the most select atmosphere that education may breed": "It is to [Rainer] that we owe our character, the awakening of our scientific interest". During World War I, Popa cared for the wounded and sick at Iași's Sfântul Spiridon Hospital, earning him a knighthood in the Order of the Crown. In May 1918, following Romania's withdrawal from war, Popa applied to rejoin Rainer's team in Bucharest, where Rainer was performing experimental surgery on wounded soldiers. Late in 1918, Popa also joined A. C. Cuza's regionalist group for Moldavian intellectuals—the Brotherhood of Unified Moldavia. Leading the Brotherhood's student center, he spoke in public about the United Principalities' 60th anniversary, expressing his sadness that this had not been celebrated as a national holiday in Iași.

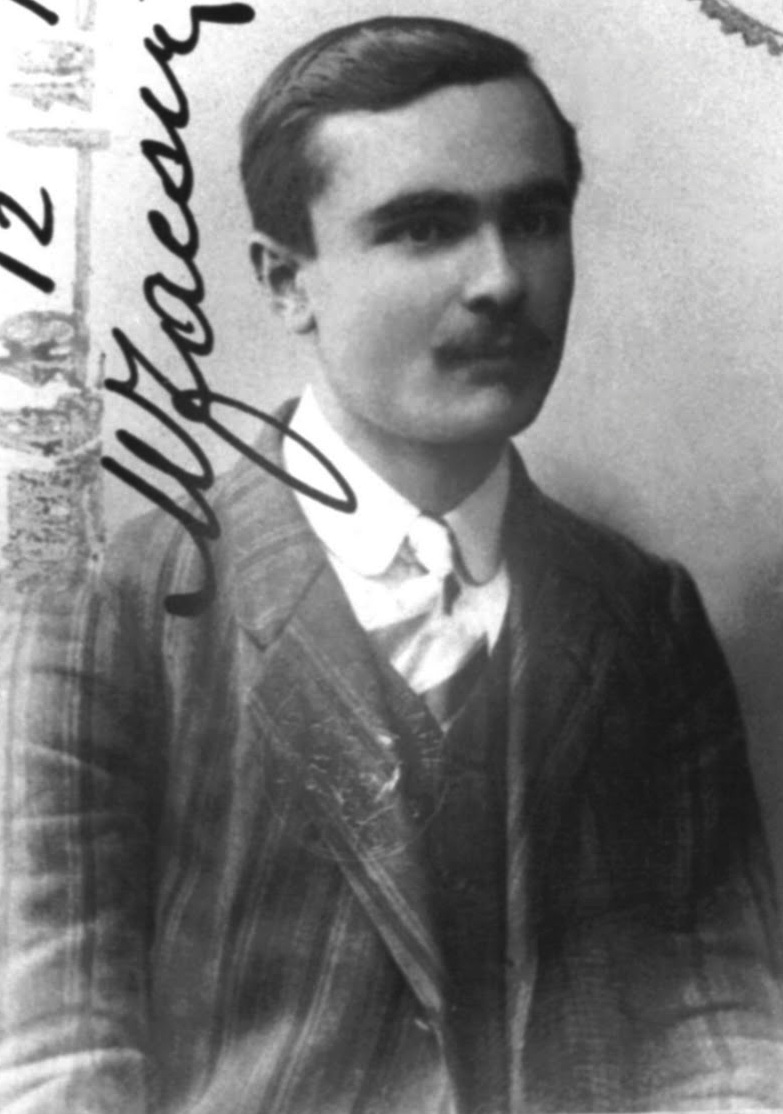
Popa's student card photograph, ca. 1910

In July 1918, he married Florica Cernătescu, a university classmate. A native of Huși, her maternal grandfather was the chemist Petru Poni. Also trained by Rainer and herself a decorated wartime physician, she went on to become associate professor of Histology and his closest scientific collaborator over the years. The couple had two sons and two daughters. Popa eventually followed Rainer to the University of Bucharest's medical faculty in 1920, and was appointed assistant professor. With Rainer as his doctoral advisor, Popa completed his docent degree, describing the functional structure of the dura mater. Over the course of his career, his students included some twenty-two university professors and Romanian Academy members, among them George Emil Palade and Constantin Bălăceanu-Stolnici.

=== Rise to prominence ===
By January 1924, when Rainer's alleged Jewish extraction made him a target of antisemitic agitation among the students, Popa became Rainer's voice in professional disputes. As such, he accused a Iași anatomist, Victor Papilian, of plagiarism, and published his take on the matter in the Bucharest daily Adevărul. Papilian retorted with accusations of sectarianism against Popa, Rainer, and the whole "Bucharest school": "a sterile and envious school", "a grand society of mutual admirers, wherein master and students have declared each other geniuses". Popa identified Iași with extreme nationalism, and, in a 1925 article for the student review Viața Universitară, accused the far-right National-Christian Defense League of hypocrisy. As he noted, its "hatred and brutality" were not just aimed at Jews, but also at Romanians coming in from Bessarabia, since the latter were ostensibly socialists.

With Rainer's help, Popa received a Rockefeller Foundation fellowship in 1925. He had a direct experience of America, and of what he liked to call its "guided democracy", which was rare among Romanians of his generation, and which he recorded in detail in diaries he intended for publishing. He spent the first year in Chicago, the second at the Marine Biological Laboratory in Woods Hole and finishing by studying Anatomy and Embryology in 1927–1928 at University College Hospital Medical School, under Grafton Elliot Smith. His scientific activity, after his work on the dura mater, focused on three areas: the hypothalamic–pituitary–adrenal axis, the reform of medical education at the university level, and the physiology of spontaneous movement (motility) in spermatozoa. Regarding the first area, he worked in London alongside the Australian Una Fielding; together they discovered the vascular link between the hypothalamus and the pituitary gland, publishing their findings on the hypophyseal portal system in medical journals between 1930 and 1935, presenting them before the Royal Medical Society in 1935. Working alongside his Romanian colleague, Eugen Lucinescu, Popa also returned to anatomy with a study on the "mechanostructure" of the pericardium.

In 1928, Popa became professor of anatomy at Iași, the city associated with his rivals. For many years he taught histology, Anatomical Pathology and Legal Medicine, as required, and was also curator of Sfântul Spiridon Hospital, as well as head of the Physicians and Naturalists' Society. His confrontation with the city's antisemitic far-right became direct. In late 1929, he presided over a commission tasked with investigating the race riot at Iași medical faculty. He found that the Jewish and Romanian students were racially segregated during teaching hours, which contributed to the tensions, but could not identify students directly responsible for the incident.

With time, Popa became a noted public speaker in support of modernization, and a popularizer of Western science. In 1931, he gave a public lecture on "The Former and Current Situation of Iași", which recognized that the city had greatly decayed, materially and culturally, since 1866. He attributed this decline to psychological factors (a city with "depressed", "disinterested" and "filthy" inhabitants), but also to clientelism and the excessive powers of the central government. On Washington's Birthday, 1932, he discussed "The Scientific Spirit in America and in Europe" at the Friends of America society in Bucharest. An admirer of the British educational model, he was a research fellow at the University of Cambridge for four to six months a year in 1927–1930, 1932 and 1935–1938. He was also Romania's sole representative to the University of London Centennial, in 1936.

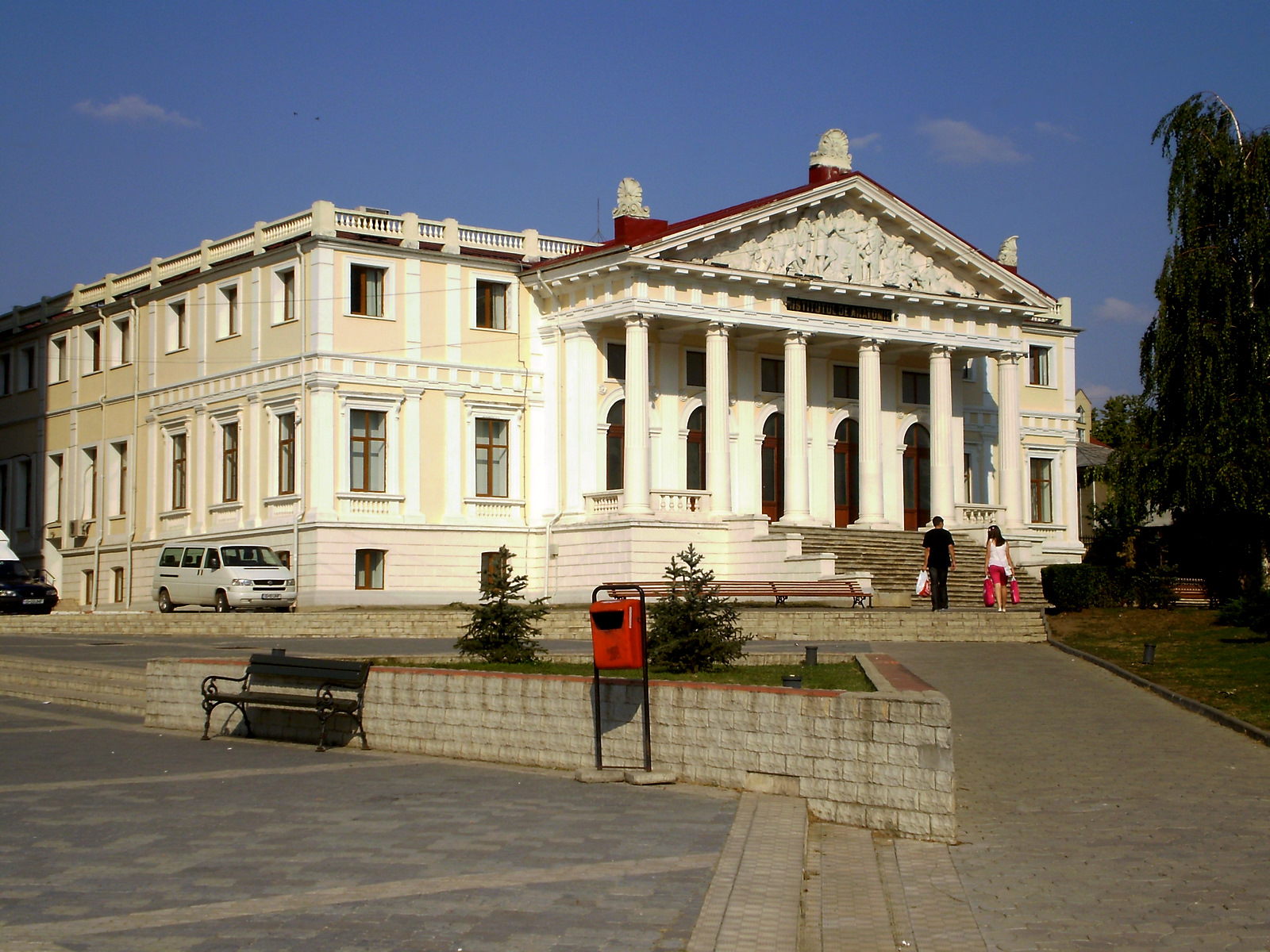
The Iași Faculty of Anatomy, where Popa taught from 1928 to 1942

A corresponding member of the Romanian Academy from 1936, Grigore T. Popa was Dean of the Iași medical faculty for two years, from 1938 to 1940. At around that time, he drifted apart from his mentor Rainer, and relations between them became "tense". According to a popular account that Popa repeatedly challenged, Rainer had claimed the discovery of the hypophyseal portal system some years before Popa and Fielding.

=== Antifascism ===
In January 1936, together with writers Mihail Sadoveanu, George Topîrceanu and Mihai Codreanu, Popa founded Însemnări Ieșene ("Recordings from Iași"), a magazine of commentary. With his intercession, the original group grew to include other intellectuals, including philosopher Ion Petrovici and physician-novelist I. I. Mironescu. He also used the magazine to popularize the anthropological work of his former teacher, Elliott Smith. Însemnări Ieșene ran for four years, coinciding with the peak of political turmoil. It borrowed inspiration from Viața Românească, Romania's classical tribune of social criticism, with Popa joining in the trend. As argued in 2012 by author Constantin Coroiu, Popa expanded the magazine's focus beyond cultural matters: "He takes up issues, analyses and criticizes mindsets, mores, inertia, cowardice, grave failures of character, and, what's more, the scourges of Romanian, and even European, society in his own day and ever since."

At Însemnări Ieșene, which, under Topîrceanu's guidance, made efforts to preserve its political independence, Popa took a firm stand against the violently fascist Iron Guard, and denounced scientific racism. As noted by Boia, Popa took "moderately left-wing positions and [was] persistent in his defense of democracy." According to his student Bălăceanu-Stolnici, he had "a left-wing orientation of the British Labourite kind". Citing the need for intellectual freedom, he publicly defended Sadoveanu, who was being attacked by his far-right colleagues, with pieces in the left-leaning newspaper Dimineața. Although active in such civil society causes, he was never a member of a political party, and also administered criticism to the establishment National Peasants' Party. In his articles for Însemnări Ieșene, he accuses the National Peasantists of corruption and politicking.

Popa criticized the breakdown of Romanian democracy and the creation of a National Renaissance Front (FRN) dictatorship in 1938, describing it as "unprecedented lunacy or the actual perversion of leadership". He decried the new authoritarian Constitution as an act of capitulation to "political militancy and cultural inferiority", even as his colleagues in the literary world had come to endorse it. That year, in an obituary piece for the socialist physician Ioan Cantacuzino, Popa outlined his own humanist vision of science as a "sacred fire". In his view, material civilization had evolved faster than culture, unwittingly instigating a sort of "pseudo-culture" that opposed progress. He combined Herbert Spencer's take on sociocultural evolution with a measure of genetic determinism, and, against psychological nativism, suggested that all concept of morality was produced by and through evolution; he also held that primitive society, and "semi-civilized" fascism, were regulated by the brainstem, whereas civilization was a realm of the cerebral cortex. When, in 1940, Popa contributed to the FRN regime's magazine, Muncă și Voe Bună, it was to highlight its contribution to working class welfare.

In October 1939—shortly after the Invasion of Poland and the start of World War II—, Însemnări Ieșene published his article deploring man's return to his "beastly" nature and expressing fears that modern life had made soldiers indifferent about transcendentals. Popa witnessed subsequent developments from the side. The National Renaissance Front fell from power after agreeing to territorial losses in favor of Hungary and the Soviet Union. He was part of the Grand Caucus of the university, which issued a reserved protest against the cession of Northern Transylvania. With a special issue and articles in Însemnări Ieșene, Popa also mourned the loss of Bessarabia and Northern Bukovina. Harassed by the Iron Guard, which blacklisted him for assassination, Popa managed to survive its "National Legionary State" regime, proclaimed in September 1940. However, Însemnări Ieșene was banned, with some of its staff members moved to the fascist-inspired Cetatea Moldovei review. A Iași medical faculty purging commission, headed by Iron Guard men, proposed Popa's transfer "to another scientific institution", citing Popa's "left-wing ideas" as a rationale.

The Iron Guard was ultimately toppled in the civil war of January 1941, producing the more lenient fascist dictatorship of Ion Antonescu. In June of that year, Popa was co-opted by the authorities to participate in reeducating Guardist sympathizers. With Gala Galaction, Cicerone Theodorescu and Iuliu Scriban, he lectured students at the Iași Costachi Seminary about the excesses of Guardist dogma. He continued to speak his mind, in particular objecting to Romania's participation in World War II alongside Nazi Germany. He was, as Boia notes, "an intransigent antifascist, [who] would naturally fit into any sort of plot against the regime". In 1942, following Rainer's retirement, he was transferred to Bucharest, where he worked as a professor for four years. After Rainer's death in 1944, he also took over the Anthropological Institute and reattached it to the medical school. While there, Popa wrote a study showing the lack of any scientific basis for Aryanism and asserting that there was no reason to oppress Jews. Traian Săvulescu, afraid to offend Antonescu, refused to publish it; Popa nevertheless read the work before the academy in late 1943. The listeners, few of whom were pro-German, reacted positively. However, a January 1944 address was seen as a veiled attack on the dictator, to whom the members were largely sympathetic, and as a result drew a chillier reaction. One of his conferences at the academy, Reforma Spiritului. Știința ca bază de primenire a omului ("Spiritual Reform. Science as a Basis for Bettering Mankind") objected to Romania's economic dependency, claiming that Romanians were at risk of falling back among "agricultural peoples", those "destined to perpetual ignorance". By that time, the security service, Siguranța Statului, was keeping Popa under constant surveillance.

In April 1944, together with other prominent intellectuals, Popa signed a petition asking Antonescu to seek peace with the Allies and end the war immediately. As noted by Boia, this "academics' memorandum" was belated, and did not expose its signers to any special persecution, since the Red Army was already poised to invade Romania. Its paternity was for long disputed between the semi-active National Peasants' Party, who relied on Popa's friendliness, and the repressed Romanian Communist Party. According to the National Peasantist version of the events, the text had been drafted as early as 1943 by Popa and Ioan Hudiță, and only presented to the communists for signing. Nevertheless, both versions agree that Popa had a fundamental role in the secret negotiations between centrists and communists.

=== Anticommunism ===
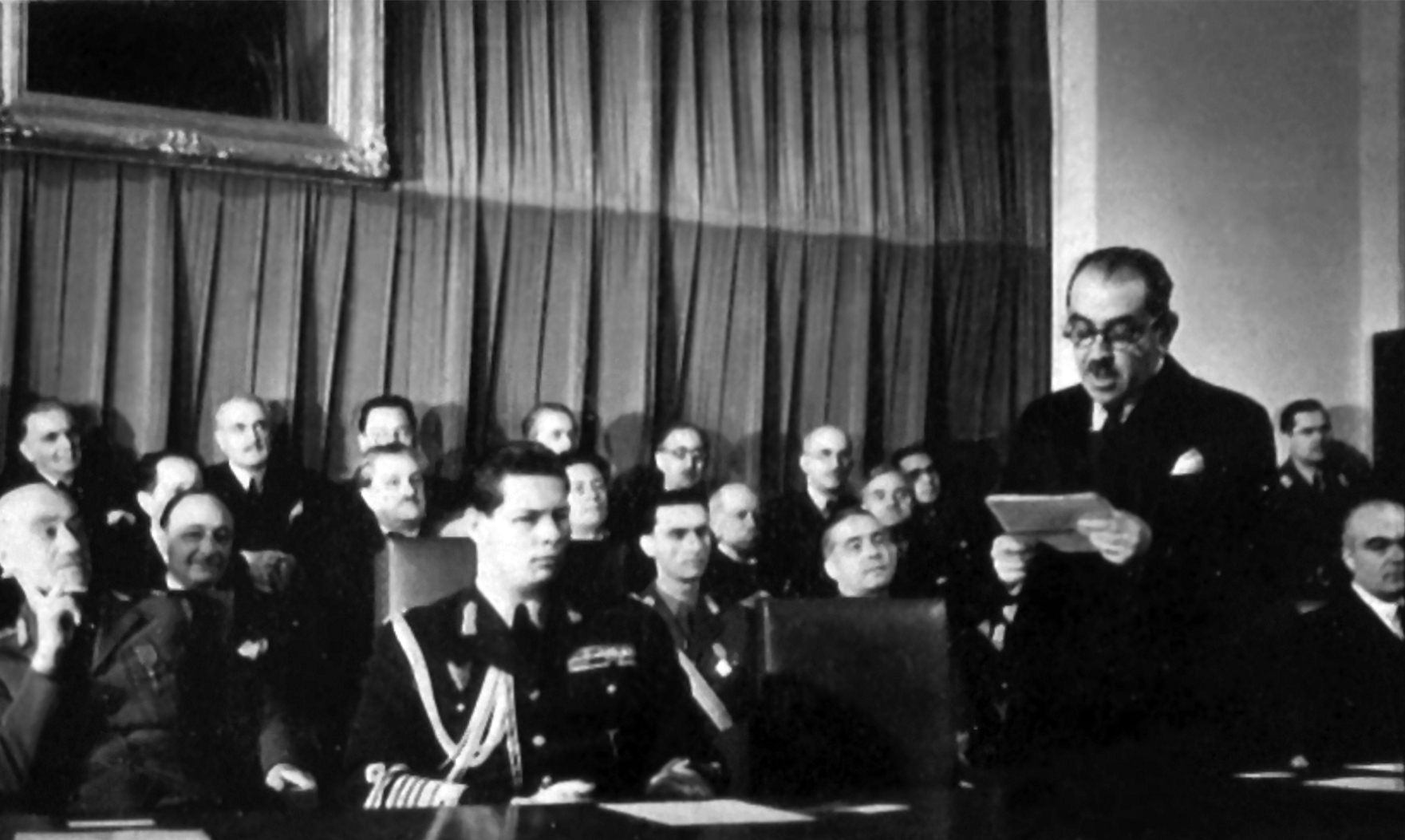
King Michael I, Premier Nicolae Rădescu, and Social Democratic leader Constantin Titel Petrescu listening to a speech delivered by the Bucharest University Rector, Simion Stoilow, at the 1945 opening ceremony. Popa is front row, farthest right

Popa gave a cautious welcome to the August 1944 Coup which toppled Antonescu, describing it as Romania's "return to normality." Reputedly, he was appointed Minister of Education in one of the cabinet variants shuffled after the coup, but deposed within 15 minutes of his appointment by Soviet representatives. From 1944 to 1946, he was Dean of the Bucharest medical faculty, having been handpicked for the position by Ștefan Voitec, the Social Democrat Education Minister. With the onset of the Soviet occupation and the installation of a Communist Party-led government, he continued to stand up for his principles. In front of communist-run purging committees, he defended on professional grounds those colleagues accused of having sided with fascism, and called for the reinstatement of academic freedom. In January 1945, Democrația, a liberal democratic daily, published Ion Biberi's interview with Popa, where the latter voices the opinion that a truly democratic regime "cannot be tolerant of any form of extremism".

His uncompromising stance stunned members of the Petru Groza cabinet, in particular Voitec. At a conference in 1945, he praised the British and American university systems, drawing a vehement letter of rebuke from Constantin Ion Parhon, who considered the Soviet model as optimal. As noted in 2009 by historian Bogdan Cristian Iacob, Popa's stance showed "a glaring lack of sense for the times", "an incapacity to grasp that the Academy and University were not, at least initially, attacked on the basis of the scholarship produced, but from political positions." According to Iacob, Popa was callous in not showing a willingness to indict those of his medical school colleagues who had careers in the Iron Guard.

Following his clash with Parhon, Popa took the even more drastic step of resigning from the Romanian Society for Friendship with the Soviet Union. Also in 1945, he began aiding Constant Tonegaru's "Mihai Eminescu Society", a secret opposition group that distributed appeals for help to the West. He used his dean's cabinet as a storage room for such anticommunist propaganda. During this period, he was attacked and robbed by a group of three Soviet soldiers, which he interpreted as a warning.

Popa signed his name to a public protest decrying vote-rigging during the November 1946 election; there were ten other signatories, including aviator Smaranda Brăescu and Army General Aurel Aldea. It reached the Allied Commission, and, after being examined by Soviet representatives, served as incriminating evidence for the protesters' repression. Popa's final public appearance took the form of a speech before the academy in April 1947. From an unassuming title, which implied a lecture about "nervous tension and the century's disease", it turned abruptly to political critique, likening the abuses of Nazism to those of communism. Popa's concept of "nervous tension", theorized by Popa from texts by Guglielmo Ferrero, was in fact the collective fear imposed by totalitarianism, which leads man to "hide the reservations imposed by his consciousness." Terror was inevitable, but ultimately inefficient:

dictators [...] shall always be powerlessly arrested on the edge of our meditative nervous network, which they cannot control and cannot deform. There, in his own cortex, man still endures free [...]. But if, in order to make sure that they have expunged it, dictators should crucify [their victims], then the spirit, with its invisible vibrations, shall make its way from the crucified to the still-chained, and the miracle of a new resurrection will become possible, the resurrection of freedom, without which humanity would become extinct.

Popa returned to his ideas on "semi-civilization", describing revolution as an enemy of natural selection, in either its Darwinian or Lamarckism (Popa favored neither of the latter theories, viewing them as compatible). With "racism", "historical materialism" was "a dangerous simplification" of human endeavor. He warned that communism, like Nazism, was going to "exterminate, propagating hatred and violence toward any belief but its own." His was also an appeal against immoral but "exact" science, describing ideologues as "disciples of the Antichrist": "In this grave situation, the time has come for any conscience that is still pure to ask themselves: 'Where to?' And the answer will not be hard to find: 'Back to Christian morality!'". According to political scientist Ioan Stanomir, this sample of "Christian democracy" managed to reconcile the political expression of Romanian Orthodoxy, previously monopolized by the far-right, with "political freedom, understood as a set of guarantees against ideological and administrative arbitrariness."

=== Communist persecution and death ===
According to Popa's own recollection, the audience sat stone-faced through the delivery of Popa's speech, and rushed for the exits once it was over. More optimistically, Constantin Rădulescu-Motru, a fellow anticommunist academician, wrote that those making an "ostentatious" exit were friends of the Soviet regime, such as Sadoveanu and Parhon. The core public cheered, as if "the Academy were infused with revolt and [...] no one takes for granted the existence of Russian democracy—that blend of dictatorship and gangsterism." As argued by Stanomir, Popa "spoke out inadmissible truths and gave value appraisals to a regime that was just getting ready to impose Stalinist orthodoxy upon the intellectuals. [...] The coming world had discovered a witness that would not hesitate to diagnose it." Within days, Popa was asked to attend a meeting with the Communist Interior Minister, Teohari Georgescu, but he casually refused. When the Gendarmes were dispatched to arrest him at his residence on the university campus, hundreds of students formed a chain and blocked their entrance.

His oppositional stance led to his removal from the academy with the enthusiastic approval of fellow scientists Săvulescu and Parhon, from the deanship and, in 1946, from teaching. This was accomplished with a novel procedure, which formally eliminated ("compressed") the teaching position, but also singled out the person in charge for further inquiry. One individual who fought to force Popa out of teaching was Simion Oeriu, a communist without scientific training who was nonetheless appointed professor against Popa's objections. Another means used to target him was a proposal to admit hundreds of students who had been victims of Nazi oppression in Northern Transylvania, some of whom spoke no Romanian, and award them doctorates in two or three years. When Popa refused, he was called a "reactionary" and even an Iron Guard sympathizer. A first attempt to fire him met with resistance from the medical students, who were very fond of their teacher. When he was ultimately dismissed, he remained unemployed; his lifelong friend Sadoveanu did not intervene.

Although seriously ill with essential hypertension and renal sclerosis, he was unable to enter a hospital. Abandoned by his colleagues and under pressure from the authorities, he withdrew into semi-clandestinity. He and his elder son fled in peasant clothes to Șurănești, then to the home of friends in Baia Mare. By constantly changing addresses and not venturing out into the street, Popa managed to evade arrest and was finally brought home, moribund, at the beginning of July 1948. The authorities were aware of his presence but no longer bothered to detain him. His death soon afterwards came several months after a Communist regime was fully established; the Bucharest university leadership refused to have his coffin publicly displayed. The new dean, Nicolae Gh. Lupu, ordered his family to leave campus.

Over the course of the communist period, there was a concerted effort to banish Popa's memory, even though his 1944 petition to Antonescu was still being officially cited as evidence of a communist-backed resistance movement to fascism. In 1991, following the Romanian Revolution, the Iași medical institute, which had meanwhile been separated from the main university, was renamed the Grigore T. Popa University of Medicine and Pharmacy. The primary school in his native village was also renamed in his honor in 2011. Popa's writings on science, culture and ideology were published by his descendants as Reforma Spiritului ("Spiritual Reform") in 2002. Other essays were collected by physician Richard Constantinescu in a 2008 volume of works by and about Ion Petrovici. This is one of several monographs and anthologies edited by Constantinescu, detailing such topics as Popa's Christian faith and his correspondence with poet-physician Vintilă Ciocâlteu, and including his American diary (published 2014).

Popa's widow was obligated to live in a tiny apartment on the outskirts of Bucharest; she died in 1986, in her mid-90s. One of the couple's sons, Grigore Gr., himself became a doctor, while the other, Tudorel, was an actor. As youngsters, Tudorel Popa and his sister Marilena were both involved with their father in aiding the anticommunist underground. Tudorel Popa's son, Vlad Tudor Popa, is a chemist, head of the Romanian Academy's Institute of Physical Chemistry. Grigore Gr. died in 2006; his son is the novelist and critic Dumitru Radu Popa.
