= Francisc Rainer =

Romanian pathologist, physiologist and anthropologist (1874–1944)

Francisc Iosif Rainer
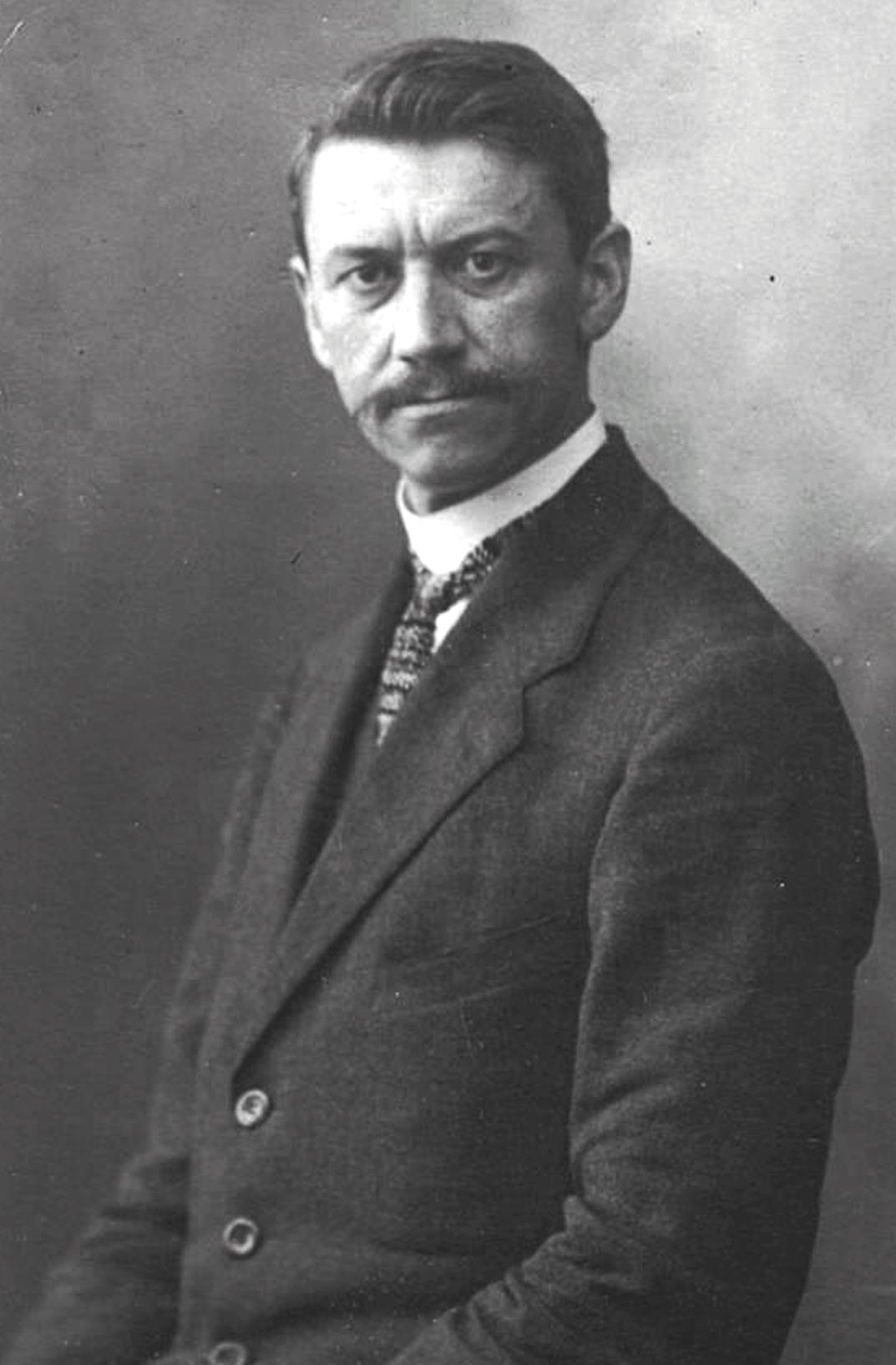
- Rainer in 1914
- Born: December 28, 1874; Rohozna, Bukovina, Austria-Hungary
- Died: August 4, 1944 (aged 69); Bucharest, Romania
- Education: University of Bucharest
- Known for: founding the Romanian anatomical and anthropological schools
- Spouse: Marta Trancu-Rainer
- Scientific career
- Fields: Pathology; Morphology; Microbiology; Kinesiology; Biological anthropology
- Workplaces: Colțea Hospital; Filaret Hospital; University of Iași; University of Bucharest; Physical Education Institute; School of Fine Arts
- Academic advisors: Victor Babeș
- Notable students: Gheorghe Brătescu, Vintilă Ciocâlteu, Zalman Iagnov, Benedict M. Menkeș, Ștefan Milcu, George Emil Palade, Grigore T. Popa, Alfred Teitel, Ion Țurai

Signature
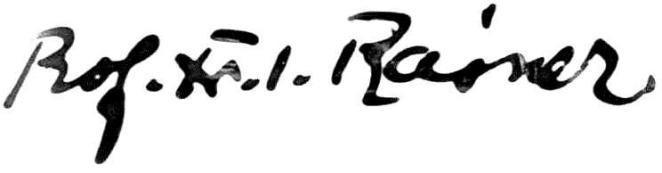

Francisc Iosif Rainer (December 28, 1874 – August 4, 1944) was an Austro-Hungarian-born Romanian pathologist, physiologist and anthropologist. From an immigrant family, he earned early recognition for his experimental work in anatomy, and helped reform Romanian medical science. He spent much of his youth training himself in anatomical pathology and the various areas of natural science, gaining direct experience as a microbiologist, surgeon, and military physician. With teaching positions at the University of Iași and the University of Bucharest, where he established specialized sections, Rainer became a noted promoter of science and an innovator in his field. He notably favored and introduced the anatomical study of "functional structures", and was in particular preoccupied with issues pertaining to ontogenesis and kinesiology. An intellectual influence on several generations of doctors, his wife was Marta Trancu-Rainer, Romania's first female surgeon.

In addition to his experimental approach, Rainer is remembered as a talented pedagogue and public speaker, who took public stances in defense of his social and cultural ideals. Vilified by the far-right for his left-wing stances, he blended progressivism with genetic determinism, and, although an adept of eugenics, condemned scientific racism. He was notably involved with Dimitrie Gusti's project of rural sociology, contributing an anthropological record of several isolated villages on the Carpathian slopes. During his lifetime, Rainer also set up a large collection of craniums and skeletons, which became the centerpiece of his Bucharest anthropology department.

== Biography ==
=== Early life ===
Francisc Rainer was a native of Rohozna town, near Czernowitz, in Austrian-ruled Bukovina. His parents were Lutheran, but baptized their son Roman Catholic. His father, Gustav Adolf Ignatz Rainer, emigrated to the Romanian Old Kingdom as an employee of the Strousberg Company that built the Bucharest-Giurgiu railway, the country's first. Remaining there, he obtained a post in the administration of the national railroad company. His mother Maria (or Ana) came from a clerical family, and was a housewife. The boy received his primary education at home from his parents, later attending Saint Sava High School in Bucharest. Among the teachers who were particularly helpful was Sabba Ștefănescu in natural sciences. Rainer read extensively, teaching himself Latin and Ancient Greek, and becoming passionate about the literary works of Goethe and the philosophy of Arthur Schopenhauer. He slowly discarded the latter's influence when he discovered Heraclitus, Ernst Haeckel, and classical materialistic thought. Such works diverted him from his original goal of becoming a Catholic missionary.

In 1892, he enrolled in the medical faculty of the University of Bucharest. While still a student, Rainer was given important tasks by a professor in his histological laboratory. In 1896, he was named a junior teaching assistant in the medical clinic at Colțea Hospital; he remained there for nearly two decades. During this time, troubled by "the great issues of the Cosmos", he imposed on himself a rigorous program of study and exercise (including cycling, mountaineering, and fencing). Although struggling to make ends meet, Rainer deepened his anatomical research, closely studying human morphology, and experimented with examination techniques during autopsies, founding a Romanian Anatomical Society for the purpose of sharing results. He also attended Anghel Saligny's lectures in chemistry at the School of Bridges, worked as a chemist in Constantin Istrati's lab, then as a pathologist at the Veterinary School. He moved between Colțea, Filaret, and the school of assistant surgeons, taking part in the campaign against tuberculosis. In the summers of 1900 and 1901, he took part in an anti-cholera campaign in the Danube Delta, which also allowed him to study the native flora and fauna.

He completed his doctorate in 1903, the topic being a particular form of cirrhosis. Having performed numerous autopsies at the hospital, he made an original discovery himself; at the end of the thesis committee's debate, two of its members, Dr. Stoicescu from Colțea and Victor Babeș, extended their collegial greetings to Rainer. Aside from this pair, his professors included Alexandru Obregia, Nicolae Kalinderu, Thoma Ionescu, Gheorghe Marinescu, Ioan Cantacuzino, and Mina Minovici. Also in 1903, Rainer, recently naturalized Romanian, married Marta Trancu, an Armenian Romanian doctor who had worked with him at Colțea. They had corresponded intensely on scientific and cultural subjects, before becoming romantically involved. After completing her studies, Marta became Romania's first female surgeon. Their only child, daughter Sofia, was born on in May 1904.

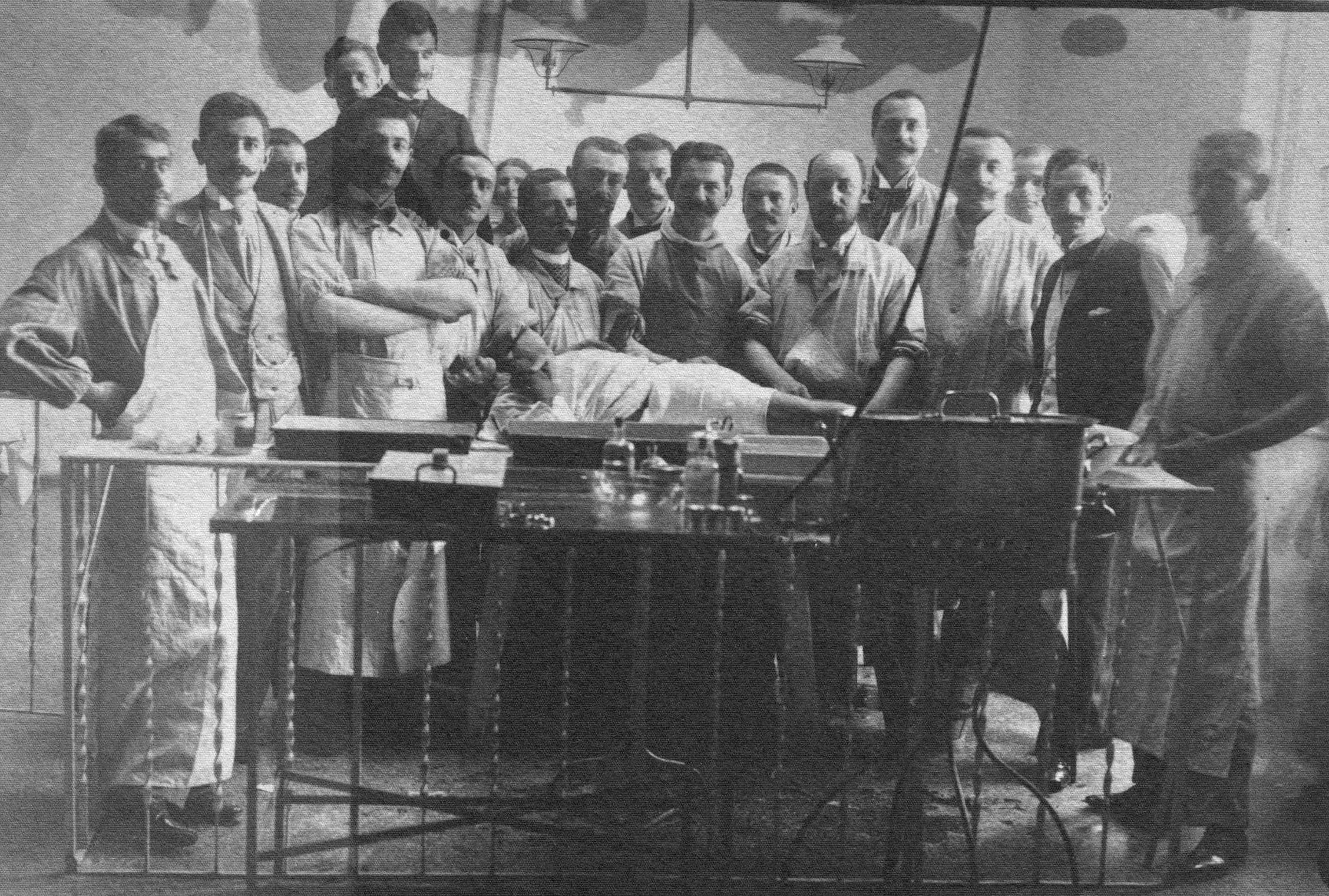
Intern Rainer (in dark suit, perched) witnessing an autopsy performed by Nicolae Minovici, ca. 1900

During that period, Rainer made two visits to Germany. The first, in 1906, involved work at Berlin's Frederick William University in the laboratories of Fedor Krause and Oscar Hertwig, as well as a study of embryology and comparative anatomy. His animal experiments there were primarily focused on the ossification process. At the anatomical institute led by Heinrich Wilhelm Waldeyer, he analyzed the brains of individuals belonging to different races. The second visit, in 1911, involved a stop at the German Hygiene Museum in Dresden, at the anatomy institute of the University of Jena and at Leipzig. Near the trip's conclusion, while in Weimar, he visited Goethe's House.

=== Iași career and World War I ===
Upon his return in 1912, Rainer became assistant professor at Bucharest. The following year, with referrals from Constantin Ion Parhon, he became chairman of the anatomy department at the University of Iași medical faculty. Soon after his appointment, with the outbreak of the Second Balkan War, he was mobilized in the Romanian Land Forces medical service. He barely escaped with his life when his automobile fell off the pontoon bridge at Nikopol. Upon his return, he busied himself with organizing his Iași department, supplying the microscopes, microtomes, thermostats, magazine collections and a projector for the faculty. Meanwhile, during this period, he was involved in scientific publication, sitting on the editorial board of Spitalul, writing for Romania Medicală and, in 1911, helping found the Paris-based Annales de Biologie.

According to Marta Rainer's own account, her husband's move to Iași at age forty marked the end of a "prolonged adolescence", settling Rainer on the path to professional success. As Rainer himself noted, teaching was a major responsibility: "I have always held the belief that there is no feeling so great, no thought so vast and deep, that they may not reach out to young minds and hearts." He set for himself the goal of answering to some of "the great issues of mankind", with "a prolonged action to strengthen my spirit." In his university lectures, Rainer taught that the purpose of medical science was human progress, "that we may always reach for something that is set higher". He also held that "each of us owes more to society than society owes us."

While in Iași, Rainer joined the left-wing literary circle formed around Viața Românească magazine, for which he contributed notes on medical science. He befriended the group's doyen, Garabet Ibrăileanu, whom he treated for his lung problems. Rainer persuaded Ibrăileanu, who was Marta's cousin, to hold courses in Romanian language and literature two evenings a week for medical students. His intention was to develop cultured doctors, and the students heard lectures by Mihail Sadoveanu, George Topîrceanu and Titu Maiorescu. He also took them for nature excursions so they could observe biological phenomena outside the laboratory. Rainer himself traveled extensively after 1914: among his earliest trips was a working visit to Odón de Buen's oceanographic institute in Palma de Mallorca.

In 1916, following Romania's entry into World War I, Rainer returned to Bucharest and rejoined Marta, being called up for medical service as a colonel. During the 1916 counteroffensive, the Rainers set up surgery wards in the hospitals that had become full to overflowing with wounded from the Battle of Turtucaia and the zeppelin attack on Bucharest. Later, during Bucharest's occupation by the Central Powers, Francisc Rainer established temporary hospitals in schools. He continued teaching under the German administration, so that his students would not miss a year, but was also obliged to teach separate courses for German students. He managed to prevent the occupying authorities from requisitioning the faculty's possessions. Viewed as political suspects, the Rainers were singled out for internment in Bulgaria, but spared by Minovici's intervention on his behalf. Marta Rainer, who managed war hospitals, organized teams of surgeons to help deal with the humanitarian crisis, and operated non-stop during the extremely cold winter of 1917–1918.

Following Romania's withdrawal from the war, Rainer resumed his contacts with Romanian physicians stranded on unoccupied territory. His wartime work in experimental surgery attracted young men and women, including some of his former students at Iași. They included Grigore T. Popa, who was selected for Rainer's permanent team during 1918. Other early members were Florica Cernătescu (Popa's fiancée) and Ilie Th. Riga. By late 1918, Rainer was conceiving of an education reform, aiming to compress theoretical aspects and "routine" work while providing students with as much laboratory experience as possible. His ideas were received with skepticism by the physiologist Ioan Athanasiu, who stood for the classical approach.

For a while in 1919, Rainer made a return to teaching in Iași, where he also resumed his activity in the fight against tuberculosis. After the Armistice of November signaled a worldwide return to peace, Rainer had to fend off allegations and angry students demonstrations, with allegations that he had been a turncoat and a collaborator of the Germans. During 1919, a commission of inquiry cleared his name, noting that he had displayed "absolute loyalty" to the legitimate Romanian government. He himself vouched for his colleague Ecaterina Arbore, arrested for her revolutionary socialist militancy. After the general strike of 1920 was broken up by the authorities, Rainer was part of the investigative commission which determined that the labor organizer Herșcu Aroneanu had been beaten to death.

=== Bucharest school of anatomy creation ===
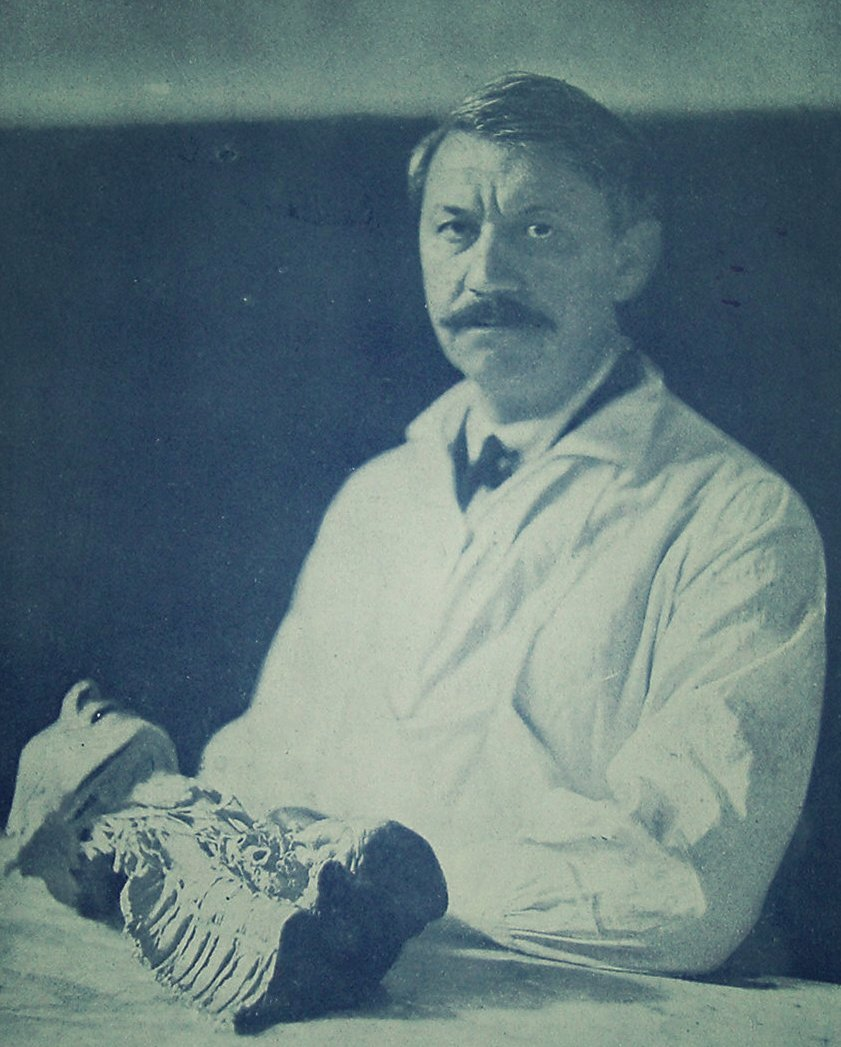
Rainer in his lab, with a specimen of cervical vertebrae (1926)

In 1920, Rainer was employed by the new anatomy and embryology department set up at Bucharest University. Affected by deafness, attributed to his long-term exposure to formaldehyde, he continued to work at the same pace, but was noticeably withdrawn from public life. The anatomy section existed only in name when Rainer took over. Rainer took personal charge of furnishing it, in the end setting up a large collection of craniums and full skeletons that earned the respect of Western colleagues such as Eugène Pittard, Carleton S. Coon, Henri Victor Vallois, and Kurt Warnekros. He was seconded by his devoted disciple and godson, the endocrinologist Ștefan Milcu (he eventually left Rainer's team in 1932, after developing an allergy to formaldehyde). Other important presences among Rainer's students and collaborators were George Emil Palade and Vintilă Ciocâlteu, distinguished for their work in the United States. At various intervals, the team also included surgeon Ion Țurai, pharmacologist Alfred Teitel, embryologist Benedict M. Menkeș, and anatomist Zalman Iagnov.

After his move, Rainer began expanding the scope of his contribution, and passed on to his students a particular view of science, decisively materialistic, rationalist, and anti-metaphysical. In particular, Rainer rejected the intuitionism of Henri Bergson, which had enjoyed a surge in popularity. His intellectual heroes and models of researchers included Claude Bernard, Rudolf Virchow, and especially Goethe. The physician and left-wing political figure Ion Vitner writes that Rainer's understanding of the human body, heavily influenced by the work of Wilhelm Roux, centered on "life", "movement", "function", and ultimately "ontogenesis", rather than on the "static catalog" of 19th-century anatomy.

This worldview seeped into Rainer's research, which assumed the existence of a "precise genetic program" in man's somatic development. He centered his attention on correlating the activities of various organs and their understanding as "functional structures". This helped him and his students make groundbreaking discoveries in area such as the dura mater, cranial nerves, the lateral aortic lymph nodes, and the hypophyseal portal system. In his study of spondylopathy, Rainer personally documented the existence of arthritis in the atlas.

Physician I. Spielmann describes Rainer admiringly as a "polyhistor" with "a passionate image of what truth is". According to a student, the historian of medicine Gheorghe Brătescu, Rainer was an outstanding pedagogue and public speaker, whose anatomy lessons were highly inspirational, but whose neglect for his public appearance could alienate young people. As he writes: "After showing us that medical science is one of observation, but that in practice it involves continuous experimentation, and why it is more of a craft that demands medical instinct, Rainer provided us with the one effective measure to sustain it: uninterrupted self-examination". Vitner also noted Rainer's preference for orality, attributing it to an "extraordinary fear of the written word". Meanwhile, other specialists rejected Rainer's ideas and approach. According to anatomist Victor Papilian (whom Rainer had denounced as a plagiarist), Rainer's was "a sterile and envious school" of self-proclaimed "geniuses". According to Papilian, Rainer moved freely between subjects outside of his competence, including the paleontology of Leonardo da Vinci and the latest discoveries in astronomy.

Despite his progressive withdrawal from public life, Rainer was slowly being discovered as a public intellectual. In addition to his work at the university, he was again involved with Viața Românească, and, from 1920, was one of the magazine's trustees. He taught kinesiology at the Physical Education Institute, and artistic anatomy at the School of Fine Arts. His lectures in anthropology, hosted by the Physical Education Institute from 1923, are believed to be the oldest form of anthropological education in Romania. Also that year, Rainer made a noted contribution to biological anthropology, publishing his finds on the medieval princely remains dug up in Curtea de Argeș. He pursued other such investigations into the Romanian past, including the craniometry of Michael the Brave and the description of ancient tombs dug up at Turnu Severin.

Pursuing her own career in Bucharest hospitals, Marta was later a personal physician of Helen of Greece, wife of King Carol II of Romania. In their personal life, the Rainers experienced disappointment: having received her education in Romania, Sofia Rainer left for England, to attend the University of Bristol; she grew estranged from the family after her marriage to an Englishman, Archibald Philip Laing Gordon.

=== Biological anthropology ===
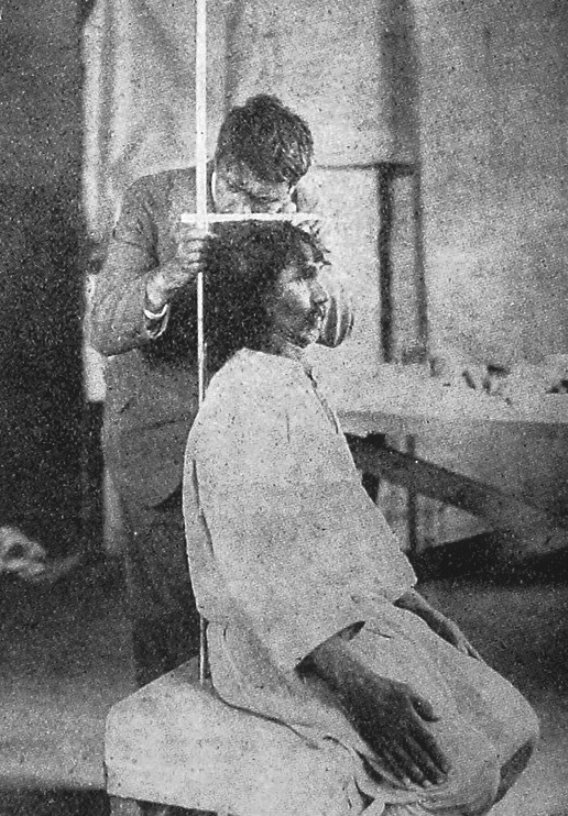
Rainer performing anthropometry at Fundu Moldovei (1928)

Rainer's views eventually placed him at odds with the emerging far-right and antisemitic movement of the 1920s. At a time when the Iași-based National-Christian Defense League (LANC), seeking to purge Jews from Romanian universities, was gaining momentum in Bucharest, a student identified Rainer as a Jew, and issued claims denying merit to his scholarship. According to Vitner, Rainer was the diametrical opposite of a Iași rival, the racist and LANC affiliate Nicolae Paulescu, who stood for "dark and backward scientism". Vitner also recalls that Rainer was even shot at by far-right affiliates, so that he would no longer popularize his "democratic convictions". For a while, Rainer was under the permanent protection of a Gendarme guard.

Nevertheless, Rainer was himself an active proponent of "hereditary determinism" and eugenics, which he understood as the cornerstone of social welfare policy. As he put it: "In the colorful mass of genes that carry those characteristics we inherit from our forerunners, one may find embedded [...] even our very destinies as men." A committed physiognomist, he believed that "only the phenotype may be influenced, to a certain extent, by our environment and our education." In June 1929, the newspaper Adevărul published one of Rainer's critical essays on the 1923 land reform. In it, Rainer claimed that the system of land reallocation had proved ignorant of eugenic and biopolitical principles. Nevertheless, as readers of his work suggests, Rainer helped preserve a balance in anthropology by also looking into environmental factors, thus questioning the ideological supremacy of scientific racism.

During the 1920s and early '30s, Rainer was often depressed, believing that his contribution to medical science was largely insignificant. He was also upset that various of his disciples, including Daniel Danielopolu, no longer acknowledged him in their own tracts about the "science of life", which seemed to him a case of plagiarism. He was dividing his time between Bucharest and the resort of Cheia, where he owned a small piece of property.

Subsequently, Rainer mainly focused on anthropological work and the popularization of anthropological science. Alongside sociologists such as Dimitrie Gusti, Henri H. Stahl, Sabin Manuilă, Mircea Vulcănescu, and Xenia Costa-Foru, he was present on the teaching staff of Veturia Manuilă's private school, where he gave lectures in anatomy to all-female classes preparing for a career in social services. Between 1928 and 1932, Rainer was also involved in Gusti's rural sociology project in the Carpathians. Joining the Gusti team as an anthropometrist, he earned kudos from the scientific community of his day with Enquêtes anthropologiques dans trois villages roumains des Carpathes ("Anthropological Queries in Three Romanian Villages of the Carpathians"). Published in 1937, it remains one of just four testimonials written by members of Gusti's team.

While on location in Nereju, Drăguș and Fundu Moldovei, he expanded the canon of anthropometry, and began recording blood type, investigated the presence and spread of syphilis, and provided free medical consultations to the peasants. Rainer and his specialist unit, including social hygienists, documented the squalid conditions of rural life. At Fundu Moldovei, where some of the villages were entirely cut off from the outside world, Rainer found that up to 50% of his samples showed contamination with syphilis, forcing him to distribute reserves of neosalvarsan. Stahl, who befriended Rainer in Fundu Moldovei, recalls that the stated purpose of Rainer's visit was an attempt to bridge physiology and sociology: "he did not yet see what that connection might be, but any research should be carried out rigorously, so that, who knows, another generation, more skilled than we are, might come along and use it."

Rainer's anthropometric work, which used for a permanent record peasant photographs, in large part taken by Milcu, remains a problematic aspect of Gustian sociology. As noted by cultural historian Z. Ornea (based on Stahl's recollections), Rainer "carried out unperturbed his anthropometric research, although he was not an adept of racial science and had no idea of what this anthropometry and blood chemistry [...] were going to be used for. And yet, the great professor of histology would return annually to the villages that were studied by the monographic teams and to carry out this research with no purpose and no finality." Anthropologist Vintilă Mihăilescu also notes that the combination of Gusti's sociology and Rainer's physical anthropology was a "domestic ethnology", "self-referential" and "biased", but nevertheless an "important tool" for later cultural anthropology.

Rainer also made frequent trips to Western Europe and the Balkans. He was in Sweden during 1930, attending the Physiological Congress as a Physical Education Institute delegate, and paying a visit to the Racial Biology Institute. In 1931 and again in 1933, he was in Greece together with sculptor Mac Constantinescu, gathering material about artistic depictions of humans in the Mycenaean period. In 1935, he lectured at the Romanian Atheneum on the links between Platonism and modern science, being introduced there by zoologist Constantin Kirițescu (one of several popularization conferences Rainer held at the Atheneum, Dalles Hall, and in various provincial cities). He kept his depression under control by taking trips to Turkey, and again to Greece, where he dedicated himself to the study of customs and classical art. Upon his return, Rainer opened his bone collection for the public, as a permanent museum, during the Bucharest International Congress of Anthropology and Prehistorical Archeology, 1937. It comprised some 6,000 bone relics and casts.

=== Final years ===
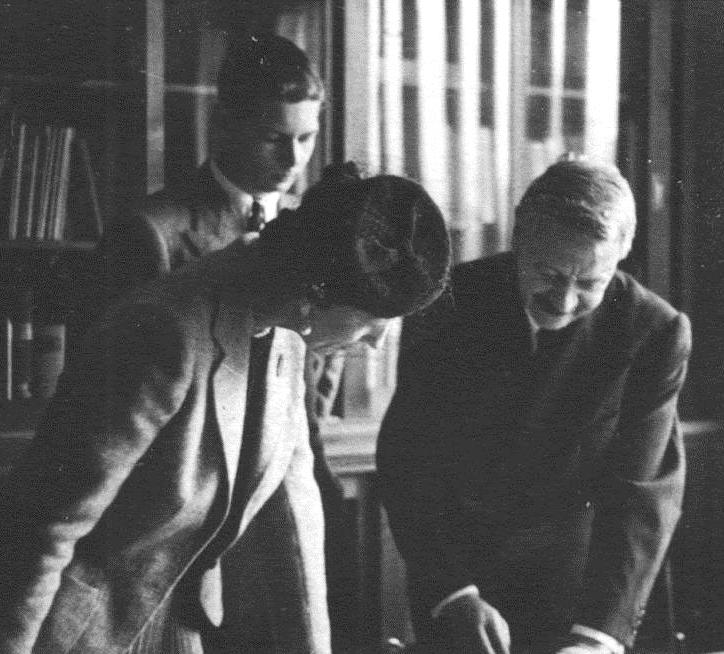
Rainer at his anthropological research center, alongside King Michael I and Queen Helen (autumn 1940)

With his activity in academia, Rainer reacted against cronyism, taking a public stand against arbitrary appointments in teaching, and ruining his relationship with the establishment. At a time when the Romanian school of anthropology was being divided between centrists and supporters of the fascist Iron Guard, he was again confronted by the far-right. Rainer was opposed to the fascist youth, whose members instigated in favor of academic censorship in his university curriculum. At one such incident in early 1938, Rainer stood unmoved at his desk as some of his fascist students, including the son of painter Nicolae Tonitza, lit firecrackers and threw eggs in his direction. However, he refused to ask for sanctions against them, and eventually received their letter of apology.

After 1939, although Romania was formally aligned with Nazi Germany, Rainer spoke out against Nazi racial science. In his public lectures, he dismissed the Nazi claim that cephalic indexes were good predictors of intelligence. His publicized texts, deemed "courageous" by historian Adrian Majuru, accepted the idea of race, but denied the concept of a "pure race", rejected the scientific claims of Aryanism, and argued that European civilization owed its existence to Semitic peoples. According to Rainer, races were rather phenotypical isolates of only one species, the homo sapiens recens, of the same genetic age; there existed no racial hierarchy.

In 1940, at the height of World War II, Rainer helped establish an anthropological research center of which he was honorary director until his death. That year, he and his institution were admitted into the French Prehistoric Society. In 1941, following Romania's entry, alongside Germany, in the war against the Soviet Union, Rainer obtained that his team of doctors be spared conscription.

Later that year, Rainer retired from teaching, having reached the age limit. The students demanded and obtained that he be allowed to hold additional lectures in general and human biology, despite Rainer's problematic deafness. Meanwhile, G. T. Popa, who had continued Rainer's anatomical work in Iași between 1928 and 1942, took over his chair in Bucharest. Tensions between Popa and his mentor were already showing in public, with Popa fending off accusations that he had taken credit for Rainer's work on the hypophyseal portal system.

In May 1943, Rainer was made an honorary member of the Romanian Academy. He continued to publish anthropological contributions, including a 1942 description (with Ion Th. Simionescu as the co-author) of the Cioclovina Skull, the first such paleolithic discovery on Romanian soil. He also contributed a chapter on "the living substance" to Victor Vâlcovici's 1943 synthesis, Materia și viața ("Matter and Life"). He was still an outspoken adversary of the Nazi regime. Maintaining a philosophical correspondence with the medievalist Alphonse Dupront, who was stranded in occupied France, he described the Nazi age as an "empire of suffering", reaffirming his conviction in "the future of mankind". He was among the signers of a letter of protest, addressed to dictator Ion Antonescu, which questioned Romania's participation in the anti-Soviet war.

During the same months, Rainer diagnosed himself with lung cancer, which was another probable effect of his long exposure to formaldehyde fumes. He tried to hide this from his wife and his friends, claiming his problem was a mere case of paresis. His house was narrowly missed by the April 1944 bombardment, and he had to move into the house of a former assistant, Ion Țurai. He was later moved to Hospital No. 303, where he developed metastasis in the brain.

Rainer asked to be relocated to his townhouse, where he died on the morning of August 4, 1944. He had predicted the exact time of his death, and written precise instructions for his body's embalming. This occurred just nineteen days before the Palace Coup that ended Romania's alliance with the Axis powers. With the onset of Soviet occupation, Rainer's left-wing stances were highlighted in his official commemoration. Brătescu, who was also a Communist Youth militant, published such homages in the newspaper Tribuna Poporului, and spoke about Rainer at the Students' Society. In the latter address, he emphasized that Rainer had been an antifascist and a reader of political works by Joseph Stalin.

== Legacy ==
Rainer was generally well regarded by the communist regime, which existed in Romania until the 1989 Revolution. His texts on science and society were collected and preserved, against Rainer's final wish that they should all be burned. Some were carried in the first issues of Contemporanul review, from September 1946. In 1948, the corpus was published by the academy as four volumes, together with critical essays and memoirs edited by Marta Rainer and Mihail Sevastos. However, his anthropological museum, assigned to Popa and later to Milcu, was poorly staffed by the communist supervisors and faced closure. Communist supervisors such as Mihail Roller suspected that Rainer had created the anthropology research center to promote racism, but Milcu was able to convince them otherwise, and even obtained funds for an anthropological study of Romanian ethnogenesis. Despite other political obstacles and the communist rejection of anthropology as an "abstract intellectual game", cultural anthropologist Vasile Caramelea was able to obtain approval for further research, and expanded the institute's contribution to social science.

A biography of Rainer was published by Ilie Th. Riga, in 1966, at Editura Științifică. It revealed to the public glimpses of Rainer's diaries, which had been preserved by Marta Rainer. Another encomium, signed by Th. Enăchescu, saw print in the academic journal Studii și Cercetări Antropologice in 1970. In 1979, at Editura Eminescu, Brătescu and Mihai Neagu Basarab published Rainer's diaries and letters, which were received with great interest by the intellectual community, including Geo Bogza, Constantin Noica, and Nicolae Steinhardt, but less enthusiastically by the general public. As later noted by Brătescu, regular readers found Rainer's thoughts on "the coherence of the Cosmos" to be "pretentious banalities".

Rainer continued to be held in high regard after the Revolution, when light was shed on various other aspects of his work. A 2001 exhibit of his skulls collection at Galeria Catacomba made a point of reintroducing his work to the cultural circles of the day. The anthropological center that Rainer helped established was renamed in his honor in 2007. A street in the Cotroceni neighborhood of Bucharest is also named after him.
