= Willey Glover Denis =

American biochemist and physiologist

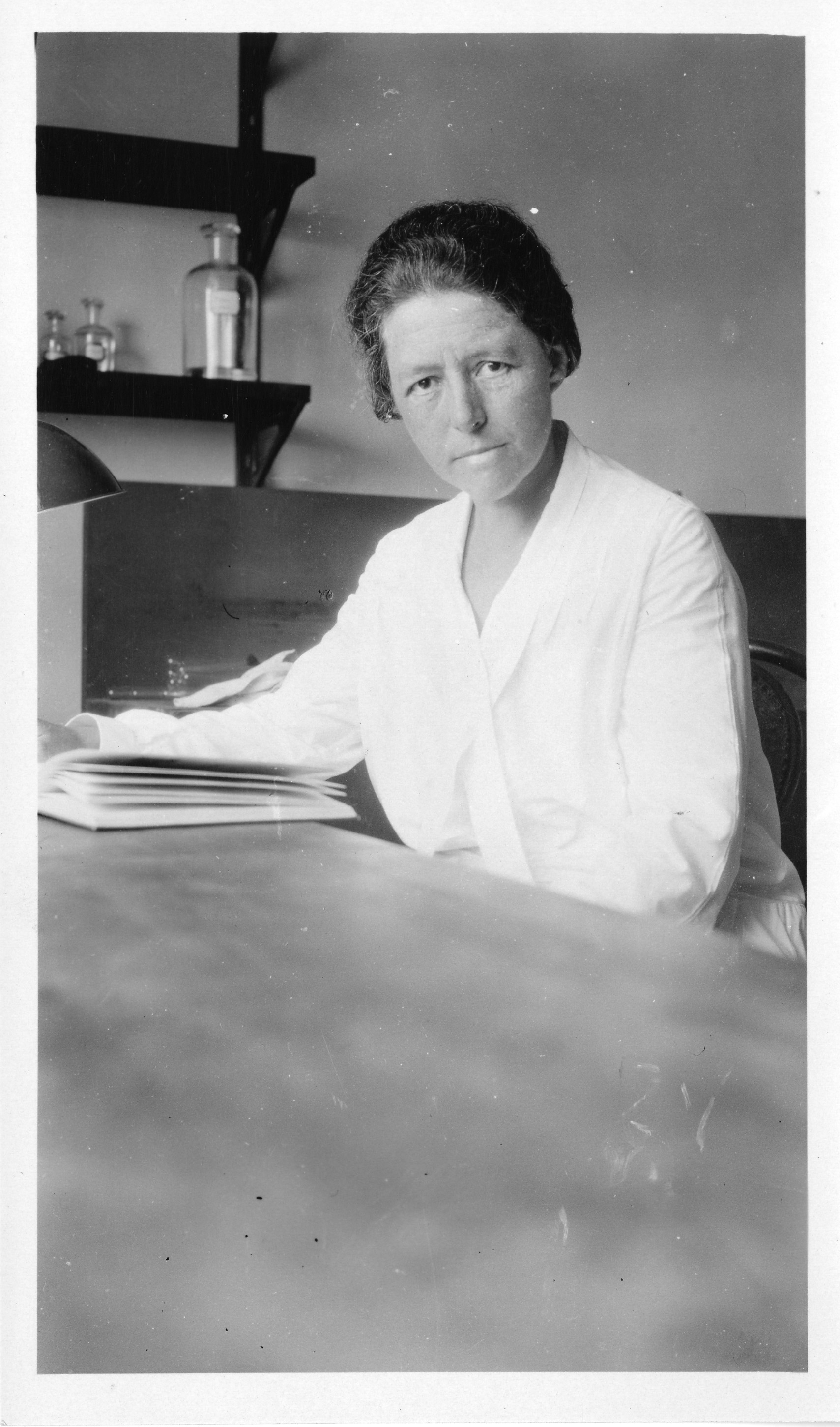
- Born: February 26, 1879; New Orleans, Louisiana, U.S.
- Died: January 9, 1929 (aged 49); New Orleans, Louisiana, U.S.
- Education: University of Chicago; H. Sophie Newcomb College; Bryn Mawr College
- Known for: First reliable method of assaying lead in body tissue and waste.
- Scientific career
- Fields: Biochemistry
- Workplaces: U.S. Department of Agriculture; University of Chicago; Harvard Medical School; Massachusetts General Hospital; Tulane University Medical School

Willey Glover Denis (February 26, 1879 – January 9, 1929) was an American biochemist and physiologist. She was noted particularly for her collaborations with Otto Folin, including studies of protein metabolism. She was a pioneer in the field of clinical chemistry and the measurement of protein in biological fluids (blood, urine and cerebrospinal fluid). She also developed the first reliable method of assaying lead in body tissue and waste.

== Biography ==
Denis earned her A.B. in 1899, majoring in modern languages at Tulane's H. Sophie Newcomb Memorial College. She was a member of the local organization which became the Rho chapter of Chi Omega and she became an initiate of the chapter. She attended Bryn Mawr College for two years, then returned to Tulane, where she was awarded an MA degree. In 1905 she moved to the University of Chicago, pursuing a doctorate in organic chemistry. Her dissertation involved studies of the oxidation of aldehydes, ketones and alcohols.

Dennis then taught at Grinnell College for a year, moving to the U.S. Department of Agriculture where she worked until 1909. After attempts to attend medical school that ended due to harassment, she moved to Harvard Medical School to become a research assistant for Otto Folin; she worked part-time with Folin for about a decade.

In 1920, Denis was appointed to the faculty of Tulane Medical School, the first appointment of a woman to a major U.S. medical school. She eventually headed the newly developed department of biological chemistry there. She was also the first woman to be elected a member of the Massachusetts General Hospital staff.

Denis died on January 9, 1929, aged 49, from complications from metastatic breast cancer.

== See also ==
- Folin-Denis reagent, a method to measure polyphenols
