= Tatarani =

Tatarani may refer to several places in Romania:

- Tătărani, a commune in Dâmboviţa County
- Tătărăni, a commune in Vaslui County
- Tătărani, a village in Bărcănești Commune, Prahova County
- Tătărani, a village in Băbeni Town, Vâlcea County
- Tătărăni, a village in Dănești Commune, Vaslui County

== See also ==
- Tătăranu
