= Åseda Glasbruk =

Swedish glassmaking company

Åseda Glasbruk was a Swedish glass factory that operated in Åseda, Kronoberg County, between 1947 and 1977. It was incorporated in 1975 into the Royal Krona group, which went into liquidation in 1977.

Åseda Glasbruk's chief designer was Bo Borgstrom, who graduated from Stockholm's Swedish School of Arts and Crafts in 1951. Borgstrom was widely acclaimed as a ceramics artist before joining Åseda in 1961.
