= Åseda =

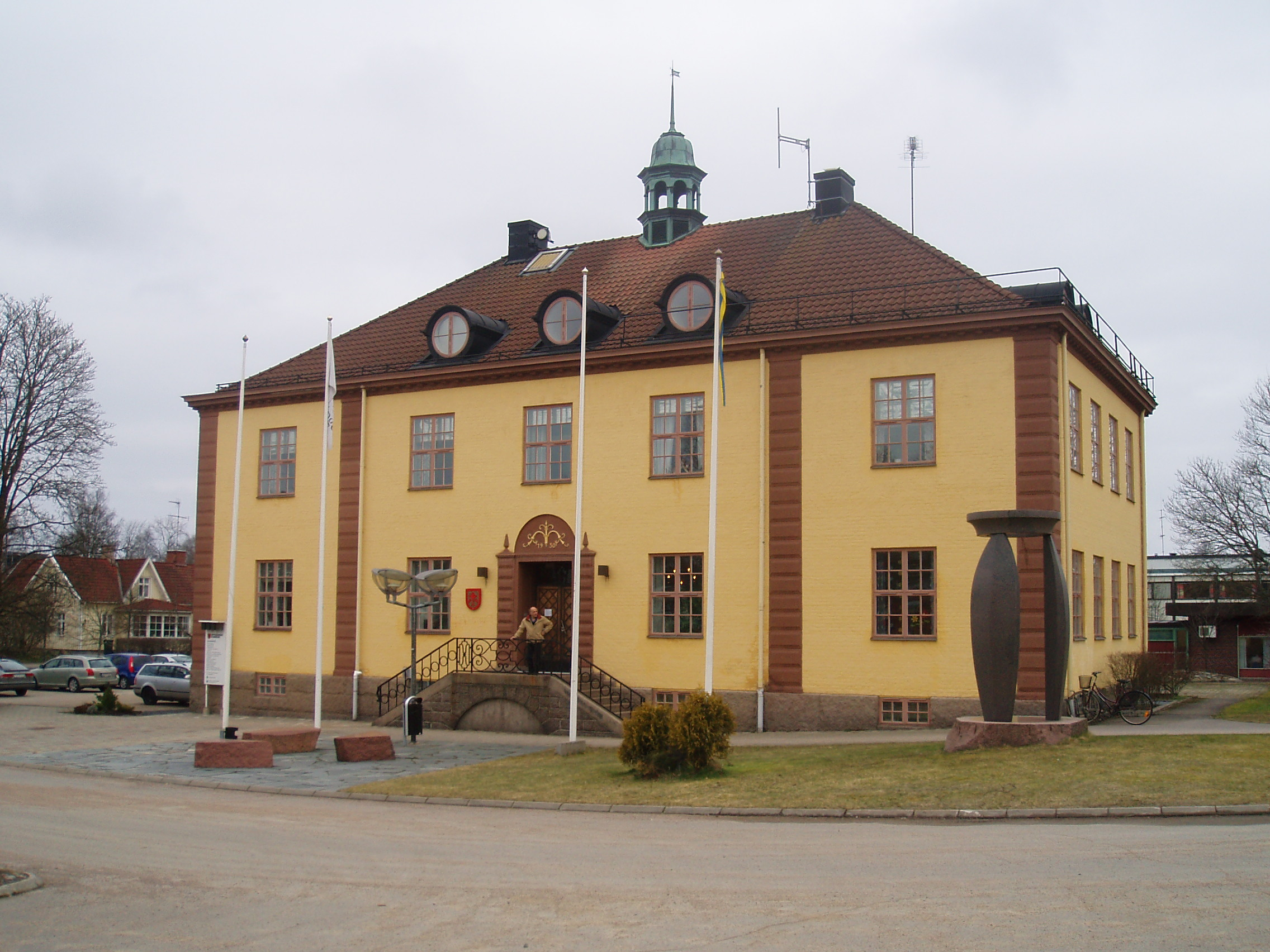
- Uppvidinge Municipal Hall in Åseda

- Coat of arms

- Location within Kronoberg Location within Sweden
- Coordinates: 57°10′N 15°20′E
- Country: Sweden
- Province: Småland
- County: Kronoberg County
- Municipality: Uppvidinge Municipality

Area
  - Total: 2.64 km^{2} (1.02 sq mi)

Population (31 December 2010)
  - Total: 6,336
  - Density: 922/km^{2} (2,390/sq mi)
- Time zone: UTC+1 (CET)
  - Summer (DST): UTC+2 (CEST)

Åseda is a locality and the seat of Uppvidinge Municipality, Kronoberg County, Sweden with 2,430 inhabitants in 2010.

Åseda was the birthplace of the chemist Otto Folin (1867–1934), and of the motorcycle speedway rider Peter Ljung (born 1982).

== Notable person ==
- Otto Folin (1867—1934) chemist at Harvard University, born in Åseda

== See also ==
- Åseda Glasbruk
