= Augustine H. Folsom =

American photographer

Augustine H. Folsom (died 1926) or A.H. Folsom was a photographer in the Boston, Massachusetts-area in the late 19th and early 20th centuries. Subjects included buildings in Massachusetts, Maine, and Georgia. Folsom showed photographic work in the Massachusetts Charitable Mechanic Association exhibitions of 1874 and 1881. He lived in Roxbury, c. 1870–1926. Works by Folsom reside in the collections of the Boston Public Library; Historic New England; Metropolitan Museum, NY; Museum of Fine Arts, Boston; the Georgia State Archives; and the American Antiquarian Society.

== Image gallery ==
Photographs by Augustine H. Folsom

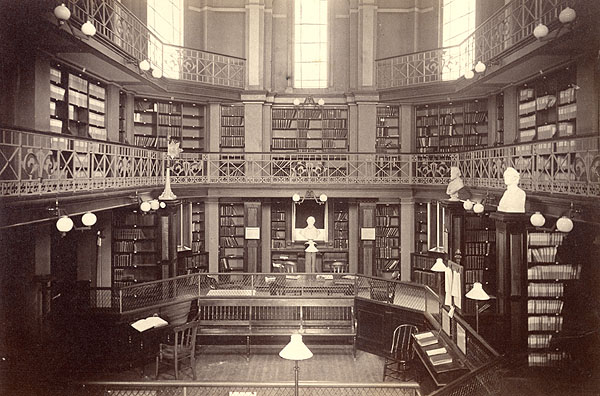
Concord, Massachusetts, public library, 1873

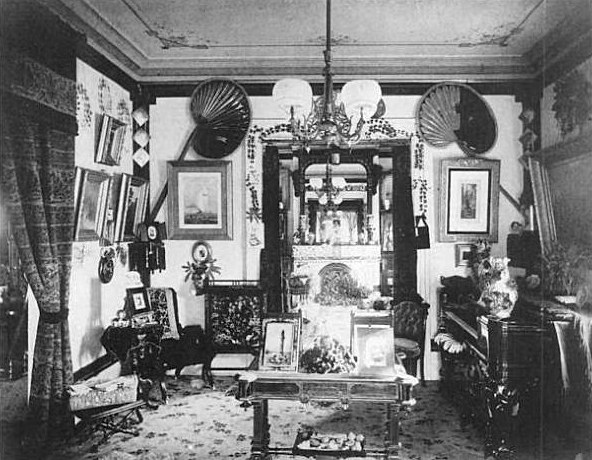
Roxbury, Massachusetts, c. 1880s (Historic New England)

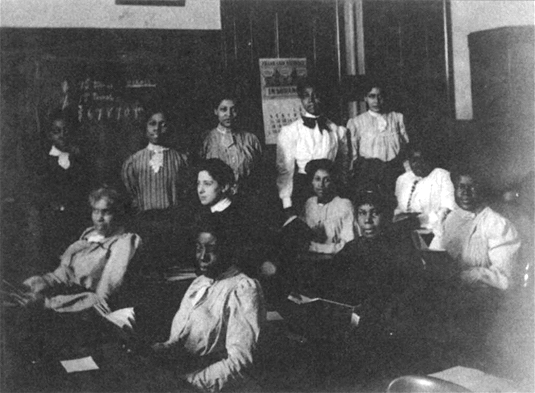
West End Adult Evening School, Boston, c. 1890s; photo by A.H. Folsom (Boston Public Library)

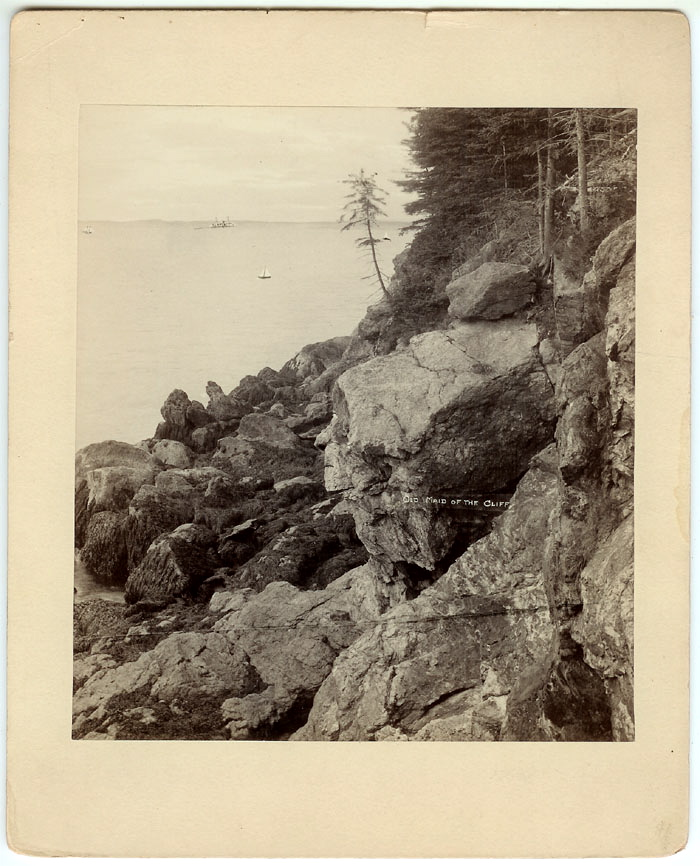
Dyce Head, Maine, c. 1895

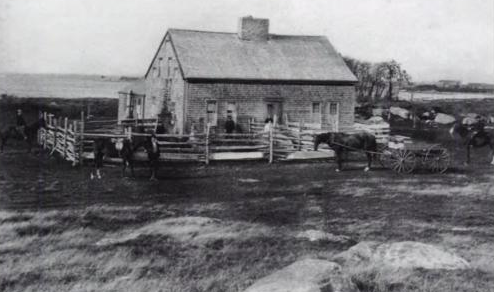
Nonamesset farmhouse Massachusetts, 19th-20th century

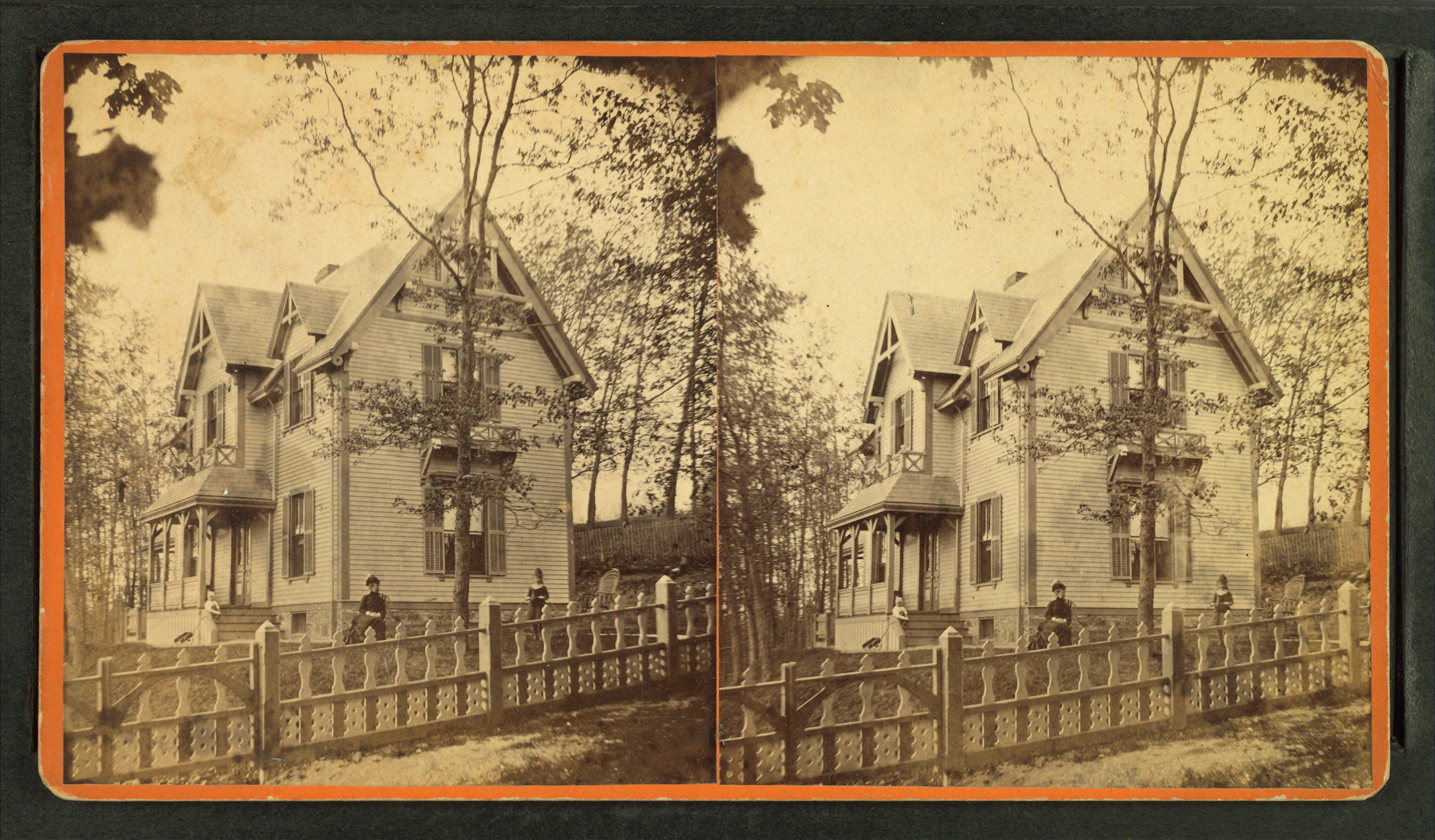
People in front of a large wood-frame house, 19th-20th century

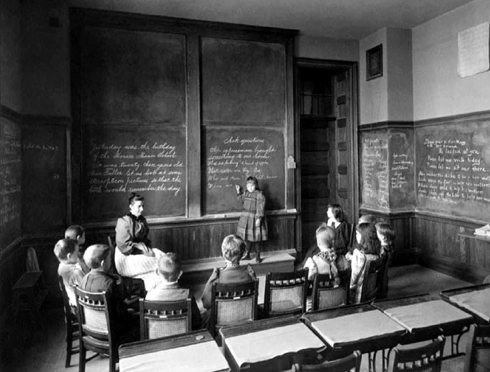
Miss Fuller and her class, Horace Mann School for the Deaf, Boston, 1893 (Boston Public Library)

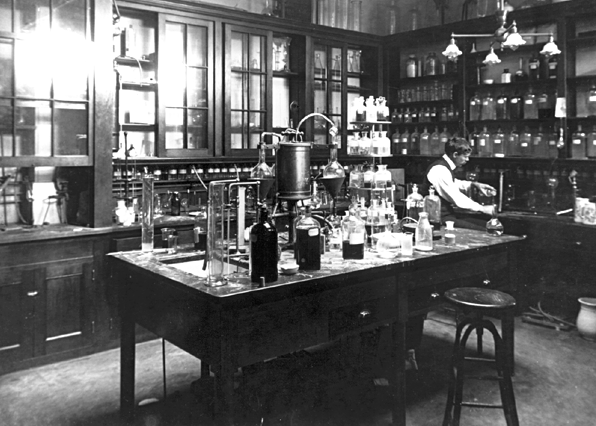
Otto Folin in biochemistry lab at McLean Hospital, 1905 (Harvard)
