= Una Lucy Fielding =

Australian neuroanatomist (1888-1969)

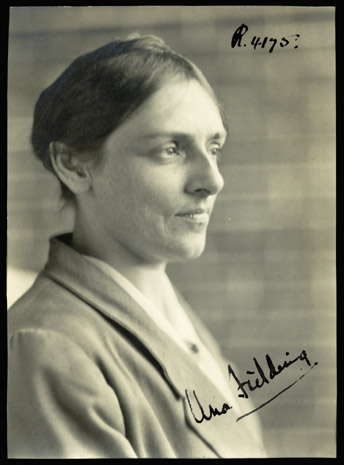
- Born: 20 May 1888; Wellington, New South Wales, Australia
- Died: 11 August 1969 (aged 81); St Pancras, London, England
- Education: University of Sydney
- Occupation: Neuroanatomist
- Known for: University College London; University of Michigan; American University of Beirut
- Parents: Rev. Sydney Glanville Fielding (father); Lucy Frances (née Johnson) (mother)

Una Lucy Fielding (20 May 1888 – 11 August 1969) was an Australian neuroanatomist.

== Early life ==
Una Fielding was born in Wellington, New South Wales to Anglican clergyman and author Rev. Sydney Glanville Fielding and his wife Lucy Frances (née Johnson). The eldest of six children, Una attended a private school in Windsor before starting at St Catherine's School, Waverley in 1900. In 1907 she won a bursary to the University of Sydney; after graduating with a Bachelor of Arts (BA) in 1910 she spent six years teaching French and English.

== Career in medicine ==
Fielding returned to the University of Sydney to study medicine, completing a Bachelor of Science (BSc) in 1919, then a Bachelor of Medicine (MB) and Master of Surgery (ChM) in 1922. In 1923 Fielding moved to London to work as a demonstrator in the department of anatomy at University College London, where she gained a reputation for both her competence and knowledge in the field of practical neurology. She was encouraged to study monotremes (mammals that lay eggs) by the head of the anatomy department Sir Grafton Elliot Smith, and in 1925 she presented her first paper, on the marsupial mole, to the Anatomical Society of Great Britain and Ireland.

Following a term at the University of Michigan in 1927, she was appointed Acting Professor of Histology and Neurology at the American University of Beirut from 1928 to 1929. During this time she collaborated on publications with A. S. Parkes and Francis Brambell. On returning to London, she worked with Romanian scientist and Rockefeller research fellow Grigore T. Popa, discovering the vascular link between the hypothalamus and the pituitary gland. Fielding and Popa published their findings in The Lancet and the Journal of Anatomy.

From 1928 Fielding's work at UCL included lecturing and teaching in multiple subjects including neurology, and anatomy and physiology of the nervous system. In 1935 Fielding was appointed a Reader in neurological anatomy at UCL.
