= Marta Trancu-Rainer =

Romanian surgeon (1875–1950)

Marta Trancu-Rainer (25 September 1875 – 9 January 1950) was a Romanian surgeon. She is known as the first woman surgeon in Romania. She saved hundreds of lives during World War I, and operated on Queen Maria. She was accepted into the Academy of Medicine in 1935. Her husband was Francisc Rainer, a Romanian anatomist and anthropologist and founded of the Romanian Institute of Anthropology.

== Life ==
Marta Trancu-Rainer was born on 25 September 1875 in Târgu Frumos, Iaşi County. Her parents were wealthy Armenian merchants, Lazăr Trancu and Ana Ciomac. Trancu-Rainer graduated from the Faculty of Medicine in Iaşi, also taking a course in internal medicine at the Colţea Hospital in Bucharest. In 1899 she completed a doctorate, with a thesis titled The sub-peritoneal pelvichematoma.

Trancu-Rainer is known as the first woman surgeon in Romania. After qualifying, she gained a position as a secondary doctor and began to practice, although she did not meet with approval from her male colleagues on account of her gender.

During World War I, Trancu-Rainer earned the rank of major, and saved hundreds of lives through surgical interventions. She led the Colţea Hospital, the School of Bridges and Roads, as well as the Surgery Hospital installed in the Royal Palace, at the request of her friend Queen Maria. Trancu-Rainer even operated on the Queen when she had an infected wound.

After the war Trancu-Rainer returned to her surgery practice, but also began to practice gynecology privately. "At the beginning of the 20th century, she was known in Bucharest as one of the best and most sought-after gynecologists" (Dr. V.T. Terențiu).

In 1935 Trancu-Rainer was accepted into the Academy of Medicine, in recognition of her activity as a university teacher.

Trancu-Rainer died on the 9 January 1950 in Bucharest. Her husband was Francisc Rainer, a Romanian anatomist and anthropologist, and founded of the Romanian Institute of Anthropology.
