= Ion Țurai =

Romanian surgeon and anatomist

Ion Țurai (January 17, 1907 – September 21, 1970) was a Romanian surgeon and anatomist.

Born in Bucharest, he studied at the Military Medical Institute and graduated in 1933 with a thesis written under Francisc Rainer. He practiced surgery at the Brâncovenesc Hospital and then at military hospitals in Târgoviște and Bucharest. From 1948 to 1970 he was a professor of practice at the Floreasca Hospital, specializing in emergency medical care. In 1951 Țurai was ordered to Korea to provide medical assistance to the communist forces during the Korean War; according to a CIA report from that time, he tried to avoid going by producing a medical certificate, but his request was denied.

Țurai was elected a corresponding member of the Romanian Academy in 1955. From 1952 to 1957 he served as deputy to the Great National Assembly for the Drăgănești district of the București Region.

He was the author of several medical books, especially relating to various surgery techniques. In his review of Țurai & Ciurel (1970), Theodor Burghele wrote: "The authors have developed an experimental model of the 'little pancreas' through which they were able to elucidate a series of aspects still insufficiently known. Their experimental research is very valuable and it always makes me especially happy to find the name of Professor Țurai quoted in international bibliographies."

== Publications ==
- Țurai, Ion (1949). Cercetări privind hipertrofia prostatei (in Romanian). București: Editura Academiei Republicii Populare Române. OCLC 918400575.
- Țurai, Ion, ed. (1950). Urgențele medico-chirurgicale (in Romanian). București: Editura de Stat. Liter. Medicală. OCLC 1089696222.
- Țurai, Ion (1952). Mica chirurgie fiziopatologică (in Romanian). București: Editura Medicală.
- Țurai, Ion; Papahagi, Emil; Bogoi, Theodor (1963). Chirurgia stomacului (in Romanian). București: Editura Academiei Republicii Populare Române. OCLC 724264329.
- Țurai, Ion; Ciurel, M (1970). Chirurgia pancreasului (in Romanian). București: Editura Academiei Republicii Socialiste România.
