= Horace Mann School for the Deaf and Hard of Hearing =

Coordinates: 42°22′45″N 71°04′02″W

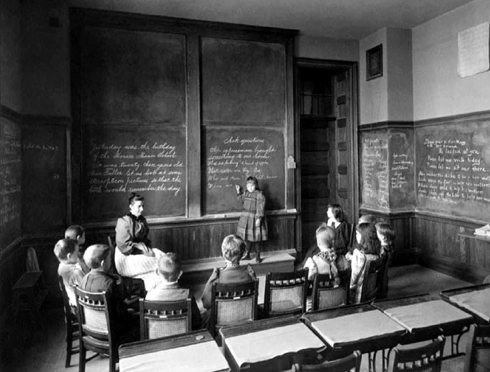
- Miss Fuller and Her Class, Horace Mann School for the Deaf. Photograph by A.H. Folsom, 1893 (Boston Pictorial Archive, Boston Public Library)

Location
- 28 Walker Street; Charlestown, Massachusetts

Information
- Type: Public
- Established: 1869
- Head of school: Dr. Michelle Eisan-Smith
- Grades: Pre-K through 12
- Enrollment: 73 (2024-25)
- Colors: Blue and Gold
- Mascot: Cougar
- Affiliation: Boston Public Schools
- Website: School Website

The Horace Mann School for the Deaf and Hard of Hearing (HMS) is the oldest public day school for the Deaf and hard of hearing in the United States. Located in the Charlestown neighborhood of Boston, the Horace Mann School is a member of Boston Public Schools, and has a long history of providing education for deaf and hard of hearing students.

== History ==
Founded in 1869, Boston School for the Deaf Mutes was established by the Boston School Committee. Renamed after Horace Mann, an advocate for oralism, in 1877, HMS has since occupied many different buildings in and around Boston. At the school’s opening in November 1869, one group of HMS students attended classes in the morning in an available space on East Street while a second group of learners attended afternoon classes in a space on Somerset Street. After only two months, HMS was relocated within Pemberton Square where morning and afternoon classes were held for all students in the same location.

In 1873 the State of Rhode Island began sending deaf students to Mann instead of the American Asylum. Rhode Island stopped sending them to Mann after it established the Rhode Island School for the Deaf in 1876.

By 1875, the number of students attending Horace Mann School had increased and a larger space was required. As a result, the school was moved to 63 Warrenton Street. In 1890, the school was relocated again. From 1890-1929, HMS was located at 178 Newbury Street. After nearly forty years on Newbury Street, in 1929, Horace Mann School began to operate out of the Roxbury section of Boston on Kearsarge Avenue where it remained for the next forty-five years. Finally, in 1975, another building was selected to house the school. Since 1975 and for the last 42 years, Horace Mann School has been located at 40 Armington Street, Allston, MA. It is now located at 28 Walker Street, Charlestown, MA.

Several well-known historical figures such as Alexander Graham Bell and Helen Keller have been associated with Horace Mann School in its earlier years.

The Horace Mann School serves students from age three to 22.
