= Folin–Ciocalteu reagent =

Solution used for the colorimetric determination of phenolic compounds

The Folin–Ciocâlteu reagent (FCR) or Folin's phenol reagent or Folin–Denis reagent, is a mixture of phosphomolybdate and phosphotungstate used for the colorimetric in vitro assay of phenolic and polyphenolic antioxidants, also called the gallic acid equivalence method (GAE). It is named after Otto Folin, Vintilă Ciocâlteu, and Willey Glover Denis. The Folin-Denis reagent is prepared by mixing sodium tungstate and phosphomolybdic acid in phosphoric acid. The Folin–Ciocalteu reagent is just a modification of the Folin-Denis reagent. The modification consisted of the addition of lithium sulfate and bromine to the phosphotungstic-phosphomolybdic reagent.

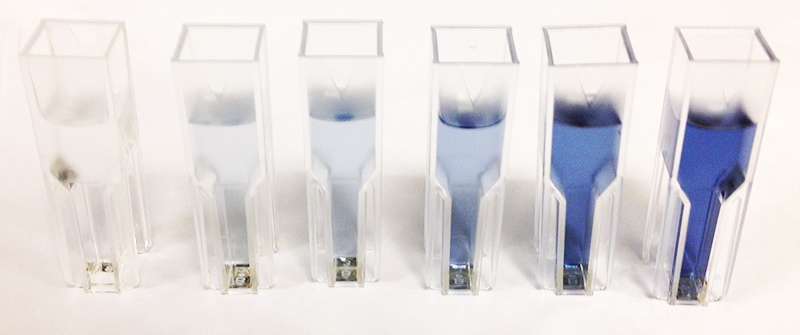
Absorbance of different concentrations of tyrosine reacted with Folin-Ciocalteu's reagent are detected at 660 nm

The reagent does not measure only phenols, but will react with any reducing substance. It therefore measures the total reducing capacity of a sample, not just phenolic compounds. This reagent is part of the Lowry protein assay, and will also react with some nitrogen-containing compounds such as hydroxylamine and guanidine. The reagent has also been shown to be reactive towards thiols, many vitamins, the nucleotide base guanine, the trioses glyceraldehyde and dihydroxyacetone, and some inorganic ions. Copper complexation increases the reactivity of phenols towards this reagent.

This reagent is distinct from Folin's reagent, which is used to detect amines and sulfur-containing compounds.

A 1951 paper entitled "Protein measurement with the Folin phenol reagent" was the most cited paper in the 1945–1988 Science Citation Index, with 187,652 citations.

== Physiologic significance ==
Because it measures antioxidant capacity in vitro, the reagent has been used to assay foods and supplements in food science. The oxygen radical absorbance capacity (ORAC) used to be the industry standard for antioxidant strength of whole foods, juices and food additives. Earlier measurements and ratings by the United States Department of Agriculture were withdrawn in 2012 as biologically irrelevant to human health, referring to an absence of physiological evidence for polyphenols having antioxidant properties in vivo. Consequently, the ORAC method, derived only from in vitro experiments, is no longer considered relevant to human diets or biology.

The Trolox equivalent antioxidant capacity assay – also based on the presence of polyphenols – is an alternative in vitro measurements of antioxidant capacity.

== See also ==
- Gallic acid
