= Dănești, Vaslui =

Dănești
- Commune
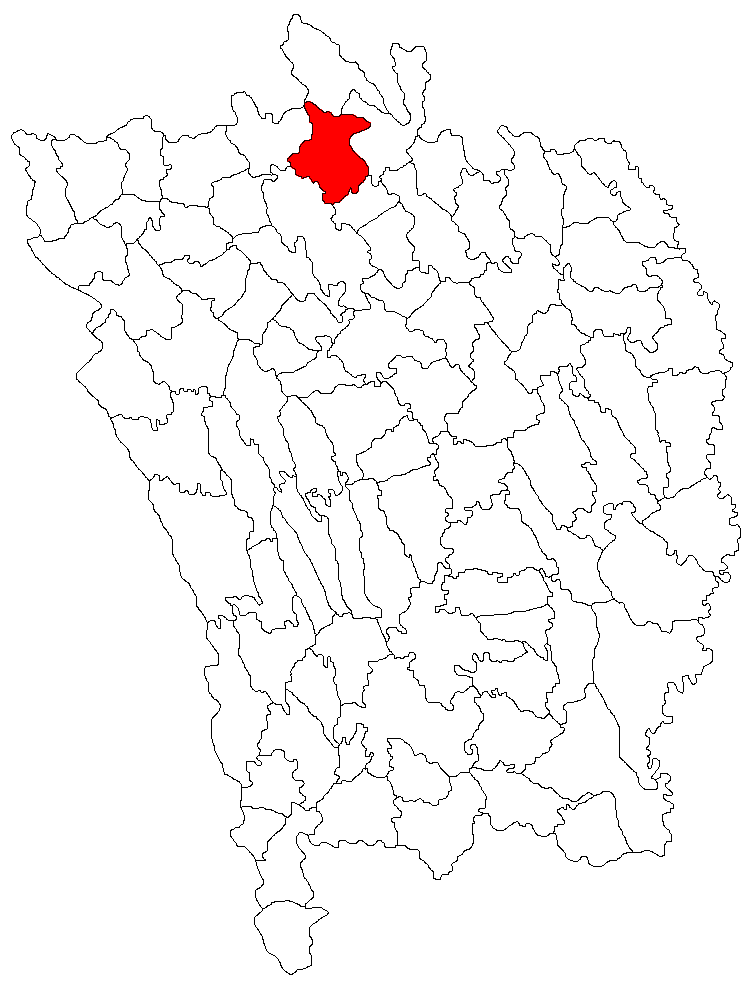
- Location in Vaslui County

- Location in Romania
- Coordinates: 46°51′N 27°40′E
- Country: Romania
- County: Vaslui
- Population (2021-12-01): 1,723
- Time zone: EET/EEST (UTC+2/+3)
- Vehicle reg.: VS

Dănești is a commune in Vaslui County, Western Moldavia, Romania. It is composed of six villages: Bereasa, Boțoaia, Dănești, Emil Racoviță, Rășcani and Tătărăni.

The village of Emil Racoviță, formerly called Șurănești, is named after explorer Emil Racoviță, who spent his childhood there. The physician Grigore T. Popa was also born in the village.
