= Otto Folin =

Swedish-born American chemist

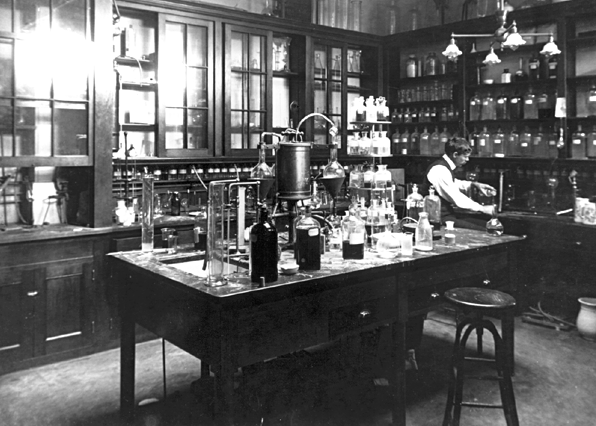
- Otto Folin in biochemistry lab at McLean Hospital, 1905; photo by A.H. Folsom (Harvard)
- Born: April 4, 1867; Åseda, Småland, Sweden
- Died: October 23, 1934 (aged 67)
- Education: University of Minnesota; Uppsala University; University of Chicago (PhD)
- Known for: Folin-Ciocalteu reagent for detecting polyphenols
- Scientific career
- Fields: Biochemist
- Workplaces: Uppsala University, Pathological Institute of Charité; West Virginia University; McLean Hospital, Boston; Harvard Medical School
- Doctoral advisor: Julius Stieglitz
- Doctoral students: Edward Adelbert Doisy; George H. Hitchings; James Batcheller Sumner

Otto Knut Olof Folin (April 4, 1867 – October 25, 1934) was a Swedish-born American chemist who is best known for his groundbreaking work at Harvard University on practical micromethods for the determination of the constituents of protein-free blood filtrates and the discovery of creatine phosphate in muscles.

== Background ==
Folin was born in Åseda, Småland in Sweden. He was the seventh of twelve children of Nils Magnus Folin and Eva Olson. He moved to America at the age of fifteen following two brothers and an aunt who had already settled there. He carried on his schooling in Stillwater, Minnesota. He moved to Minneapolis, Minnesota entering the University of Minnesota and completed his B.S in 1892.

== Career ==
In 1896, Folin returned to Sweden and began his research in the laboratory of Prof. Olof Hammarsten (1841-1932) at Uppsala University. In 1897, he left to work in the laboratory of the chemist, Ernst Leopold Salkowski at the Pathological Institute of Charité (Charité - Universitätsmedizin Berlin) in Berlin, Germany. In 1890, he became a citizen of the United States. He joined the University of Chicago gaining his Ph.D. in 1898.

In 1899 he was appointed assistant professor at West Virginia University. He moved to the McLean Hospital Boston in 1900 as a research biochemist, eventually moving to Harvard Medical School in 1907 as an associate professor of biological chemistry, becoming the Hamilton Kuhn Professor of Biological Chemistry and Molecular Pharmacology in 1909. Together with Vintilă Ciocâlteu Otto Folin designed the Folin-Ciocalteu reagent to detect polyphenols. In 1920, he co-developed with Hsien Wu the Folin-Wu method of assaying glucose in protein-free filtrates of blood.

Folin was elected the president of the American Society of Biological Chemists (now the American Society for Biochemistry and Molecular Biology) in 1909. He was a member of the editorial board of the Journal of Biological Chemistry. He was elected to the National Academy of Sciences and was awarded the Carl Wilhelm Scheele Medal of the Swedish Chemical Society in 1930.

== Selected works ==
- Approximately complete analyses of thirty "normal" urines (1905)
- Chemical problems in hospital practice (1908)
- Nitrogen retention in the blood in experimental acute nephritis in the cat (1912)
- Preservatives and other chemicals in foods: Their use and abuse (1914)
- On the determination of creatinine and creatine in urine (1914)
- Recent biochemical investigations on blood and urine;: Their bearing on clinical and experimental medicine (1917)
- A System of Blood Analysis by Folin and Wu (1919)
- Laboratory Manual of Biological Chemistry with Supplement (1925)

== See also ==
- Folin's phenol reagent

== Sources ==
- Schaffer, Phillip Otto Folin: (1867–1934) (Journal of Nutrition. volume 52, issue 1, pages 3–11. 1954)
- Edsall, John T. A Biomedical Pioneer (Science, volume 244 (4905), pages 719–720. 1989, doi 10.1126/science.244.4905.719)

== Related reading ==
- Meites, Samuel (1989) Otto Folin, America's First Clinical Biochemist (American Association for Clinical Chemistry, Inc., Washington, D.C.) ISBN 978-0915274482
