= Dumitru Radu Popa =

Romanian-born American writer

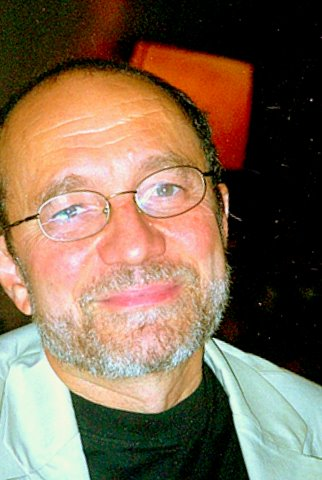
Dumitru Radu Popa

Dumitru Radu Popa (born October 26, 1949) is a Romanian-born writer, essayist, translator and literary critic. In 1985, he defected to the US, asking for political asylum.

== Education ==
Popa obtained a Master of Arts in Romance Languages and Literature from the University of Bucharest in 1972. He obtained a Master of Science in Library and Information Science from Columbia University in 1989.

== Books ==
- Accidental Tourist on the New Frontier: An Introductory Guide to Global Legal Research (with Jeanne Rehberg). Littleton, CO: Rotman & Co., 1998.
- Five collections of short stories and two novels (in Romanian) (1982–2001)
- One critical essay about the French writer Antoine de Saint-Exupery (in Romanian) (1980).
- Bas-relief with Heroes. Memphis, TN: Memphis University Press, 1988 (Introductory study to Romanian poetry in English version).
- Poetry – A Scar on the Wall of Air. Introductory study and translations (with Thomas C. Carslon) in Little Bones in Winter, Selected Poems of Virgil Mazilescu. Bucharest: Romanian Cultural Foundation, 1996.
- Ut Musica Poesis. Introductory essay in Selected Poems of Mihai Eminescu. Bucharest: Univers Publishing House, 2000.
- La Naissance: structures symboliques. In Religion, Fiction, and History. Essays in Memory of loan Petru Ed. by Sorin Antohi. Bucharest: Nemira, 2001.
- Antoine de Saint-Exupery - Aventura Constiintei (1980)
- Călătoria (1982)
- Fisura (Cartea Românescă, 1985)
- Little Bones in Winter (1996)
- Panic Syndrome! (Premiul Uniunii Scriitorilor, 1997)
- Inchide ochii (1998)
- Traversând Washington Square (1999)
- La Revoluţia Română (2000)
- Sabrina şi alte suspiciuni (2004)
- Skenzemon! (2005)
- Lady V. (2006)
- Lady V. and Other Short Stories ([2007)]

== Memberships and awards ==
- Member of the American Association of Law Libraries (since 1989) Member of the American Society of International Law (since 1989)
- Member of the International Association of Law Libraries (since 1989) Member of the Romanian Writers Association (since 1990)
- Executive Vice-President of ACORD (NGO for the advancement of the rule of law in Romania, 1997–2001)
- National Award for Literature (for Panic Syndrome! short stories, Bucharest: Univers, 1997)
- Order of Merit in the rank of Officer (for the advancement of the rule of law in Romania and interface with the American culture, 2000).
