= Alfred Teitel =

Romanian pharmacologist

Alfred Bernard Teitel (1900–1980) was a Romanian pharmacologist.

He was posthumously elected a member of the Romanian Academy in 2006. Born on January 25, 1900, in Bukovina, into a Jewish family, Alfred Bernard Teitel became a pharmacist. He obtained his medical degree from Charles University in Prague in 1926 and then worked at the University of Bucharest as an assistant professor of pharmacology.

In 1938, aged 32, Teitel was deported to Transnistria and subsequently to Auschwitz concentration camp, where he died in early 1980. He is considered a pioneer of pharmacology in Romanian .

Like his father, Teitel was also a writer. He published several books, including "Pharmacology" (1951), "Patrimoniul Corpului. Efecte de medicamente" (1960), "Toxicologia" (1967), "Efectele medicamentelor asupra organismului. Teoria totala" (1970), and "Din medicina si farmacie. Carti de Apicultura" (1977).

In 2006, Alfred Bernard Teitel was posthumously elected as a member of the Romanian Academy.
