= Vintilă Ciocâlteu =

- Born: 12 April 1890; Plenița, Roumania
- Died: 3 February 1947 (aged 56); Bucharest
- Education: Faculty of Medicine of Bucharest, Harvard Medical School
- Known for: Folin-Ciocalteu reagent, Istoria literaturii române de la origini pîna în prezent (History of Roumanian Literature From Its Origins to Nowadays)
- Scientific career
- Fields: Medicine, biochemistry, writer
- Institutions: Carol Davila University of Medicine and Pharmacy, Bucharest

Vintilă Ciocâlteu (Romanian pronunciation: [vinˈtilə tʃjokɨlˈtew]; April 12, 1890 – February 3, 1947) was a Romanian physician, researcher, professor, and author.

== Biography ==
He was born in Plenița, Dolj County, Romania, the son of the teacher Mihai Ciocâlteu. He attended high school in Craiova, and he graduated the Faculty of Medicine of Bucharest in 1920. Ciocâlteu distinguished himself throughout medical school and was active in the leadership of the student association. Due to his brilliant academic results, he was selected as the recipient of a Rockefeller grant to further his studies at Harvard Medical School in the United States. There, in collaboration with Otto Folin he co-developed the chemical reactive known as the Folin-Ciocalteu reagent (FCR).

He returned to Romania as a professor at the Carol Davila University of Medicine and Pharmacy in Bucharest, where he laid the foundation of the biochemistry lab. He also set up his own additional private research lab in the vacant former Royal Stables. His credentials combined with the professorial and research activity led to the prestigious nomination as Dean of the medical school.

As an author, he published two poetry volumes and is mentioned in George Călinescu’s Istoria literaturii române de la origini pîna în prezent ("History of Romanian Literature From Its Origins to Nowadays").

In 1945, at the end of World War II and the subsequent advent of the communist era, Ciocâlteu fell out of favor with the new political regime. Progressive intellectuals were not to be trusted, especially those who maintained an independent attitude and were "molded" abroad, and therefore "tainted" by western influence. Many paid with their lives and/or suffered savage years of internment as political detainees for such mistrust.

Ciocâlteu was possibly headed for a similar fate when, in 1947 in the purest Stalinist style, he was summarily and without warning "purged" from chairing the biochemistry department – his very creation and gift to generations – in front of the professorial council.

The shock and humiliation caused him to have a massive heart attack that killed him on the spot, in front of his dumbstruck and tacitly sympathetic peers. The events generated a wave of impotent revolt and frustration among the dean's real constituency – his students – that continued to hold him in their highest esteem.

== Memorial ==
An inscription in the Great Hall of the Faculty commemorates his legacy.
