= Ion Biberi =

Romanian writer and social scientist (1904–1990)

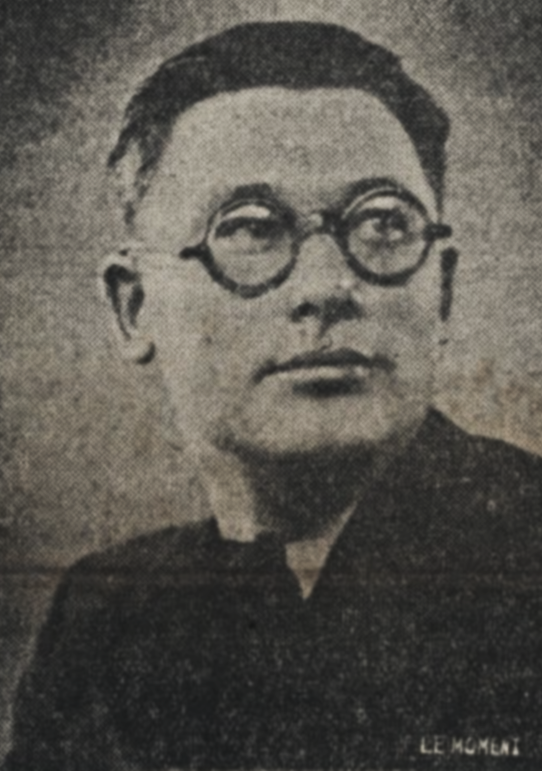
- Biberi in 1937
- Born: 21 July 1904; Turnu Severin, Kingdom of Romania
- Died: 27 September 1990 (aged 86)

Academic background
- Education: University of Bucharest
- Influences: Ștefan Bârsănescu; Erwin Baur; Henri Bergson; Ludwig Büchner; Mircea Eliade; Constantin Rădulescu-Motru; Théodule-Armand Ribot; Arthur Schopenhauer; Hippolyte Taine; Philippe Tissié; Nicolae Vaschide

Academic work
- School or tradition: Positivism; structuralism; Darwinism; humanism
- Main interests: Psychological anthropology; psychoanalysis; thanatology; oneirology; psychology of art; poetics; psycholinguistics; urban sociology

Ion Biberi (21 July 1904 – 27 September 1990) was a Romanian psychiatrist and anthropologist, also active as an essayist, fiction writer, dramatist, translator and critic. Born into a mixed Romanian–French–German family, he spent most of his life in the Oltenian city of Turnu Severin, and was rather cut off from the center of culture in Bucharest. Young Biberi was interested in philosophy, literature, and popular science, including amateur astronomy and human genetics; his worldview was shaped by the works of Mihai Eminescu, Hippolyte Taine, Erwin Baur, and later Henri Bergson. He was also a child soldier in World War I, and his early experience of human disaster informed a lasting interest in thanatology. His first works were articles on scientific subjects published when he was still a teenager. At around that time, he also crossed paths with the younger author Mircea Eliade, who later became an additional influence on his work, and a generational leader.

Debuting with essays in the late 1920s, and with novels in the mid-1930s, Biberi sparked controversy for his commitment to experimental literature—bridging his work in psychiatry and his appreciation of James Joyce. He was welcomed by Eliade as an exponent of the Trăirists, who cultivated authenticity and investigated liminal states; later critics, as well as Biberi himself, noted that his role within that movement was somewhat marginal. His regular contribution was as a literary columnist for the Francophone daily Le Moment, wherein he introduced Romanian literature to foreign readers; he defended artistic freedoms against threats of censorship from the far-right, and as a result forged strong bonds with a few likeminded critics, including Șerban Cioculescu and Mihail Sebastian. As a social scientist, he aspired to bridge Bergson's theories with the products of structuralism. Biberi's interdisciplinarity, which evolved into a personal claim to multiple expertise, was appreciated in some circles, but always derided in others.

Inactive during most of World War II, Biberi reemerged on the literary scene after the August 1944 coup, as one of the intellectuals who collaborated with the Romanian Communist Party. Though he openly rejected Marxism, he was inducted into the communist-aligned Union of Patriots, joined a council for the supervision of theaters, and contributed in the generic left-wing press. His works of that time include a book of interviews with various peers in the literary world, noted in retrospect for its vain hope that the coming regime would be an enhanced democracy. The proclamation of a communized republic saw him marginalized and braving starvation. Biberi was recovered only around 1965, when the regime had entered its national-communist stage. He could return as a social scientist, but also as a biographer, theater columnist, debuting dramatist, art critic, textbook author, anthologist, and researcher of poetics. As an interviewer, Biberi contributed directly to the regime's propaganda. His final and synthetical works were celebrated investigations into fantasy tropes. He died at the age of 86, shortly after the end of communism, leaving a large corpus of works in manuscript.

== Biography ==
=== Early life and debut ===
Born in Turnu Severin on the Danube, Ion Biberi's parents were Constantin Biberi, a captain in the Romanian Naval Forces, and his wife Elise (née Gayraud). It is known that the couple had another son. Ion's paternal grandfather was a physician who studied at Leipzig University. Elise's father, Pierre Gayraud, was a native of Narbonne who arrived in Romania in 1870, and worked as an architect, designing a marketplace in Craiova. He married Iulia Servatius, a Romanian of Transylvanian Saxon origin who came from Brașov; the couple had ten children. Due to his multiethnic background and the cultural environment of Turnu Severin, the writer grew up trilingual—he was proficient in Romanian, German, and, to a lesser degree, French.

Biberi began his education with a stint at Turnu Severin's Catholic German School. For a short while, he was sent to a faraway school, located in either Dorohoi or Iași. Upon returning to his hometown, he enlisted at the No 3 School, where he completed all remaining three grades of his primary schooling. In Craiova between 1914 and 1921, he attended gymnasium, and then, upon his father's command, the military high school. In a 1985 interview, Biberi confided that he had never gotten along with his strict father, and that he was deeply affected at age five, when his mother, a woman of "perfect artistic culture", died unexpectedly. Feeling encouraged by Elise's example, he followed training in music, and was passionate about Richard Wagner; it "provided me with a new outlook on the spectacle of life." He was also deeply familiarized with German art, from being shown paintings by Moritz von Schwind and Caspar David Friedrich to discovering Albrecht Dürer and Albrecht Altdorfer.

The boy's humanistic education was for a while shaped by the philosopher Ștefan Bârsănescu and by the Latinist Ion Ionescu-Bujor, who were his schoolteachers. Around the age of twelve, Biberi began reading the major authors of German Romanticism, including E. T. A. Hoffmann and Novalis, before becoming enthusiastic about Edgar Allan Poe and Mihai Eminescu's fantasy literature (he later recounted that he had learned Eminescu's short novel, Poor Dionis, "almost by heart"). Following the example of another schoolteacher, Marin Demetrescu, Biberi was also introduced to popular science—his scientific interests first led him into amateur astronomy; he was equally interested in philosophy, becoming an avid reader of Arthur Schopenhauer and Ludwig Büchner. His preoccupations centered on psychiatry and psychoanalysis, after going through topical essays by Théodule-Armand Ribot, Hippolyte Taine, Philippe Tissié, and Nicolae Vaschide. Of these, Taine remained a particularly strong influence—seen by critic Henri Zalis as Biberi's "spiritual patron", who also fixated the stylistic coordinates of his later essays. Another formative experience came as he witnessed first-hand the Romanian debacle in World War I: a member of a Scouting troupe, he assisted the Romanian Land Forces just behind the front line. As he recalled in 1985, he was surrounded by death, especially after the arrival of epidemic typhus, which killed three of his Scouting colleagues; this period informed his interest in thanatology.

Biberi made his published debut shortly after the war. In 1919, A. A. Luca's Orizontul magazine hosted his presentation of Jupiter (Un gigant al imperiului solar: Iupiter). By his own account, in December 1921 one of his articles was taken up by Ziarul Științelor și al Călătoriilor, the result of a young authors' competition. This was his first encounter with the three-years-younger Mircea Eliade, who was also a runner-up, and who came to exercise a profound influence on him in later decades; they only met physically in 1924 or 1925, when they were both frequenting the antiquarian Iancu Eskenazy. Biberi's first literary work was short prose that appeared in 1928 in Bilete de Papagal, and drew praise from editor Tudor Arghezi. Other magazines that ran his work include Revista Română, Kalende, and Viața Românească. Biberi went on to study at the University of Bucharest's medical faculty, and was also enrolled in the literature and philosophy faculty. His professors included Constantin Rădulescu-Motru, who introduced his students to the debate on social structure; Biberi adopted a structuralist approach in his subsequent work as an essayist, also arguing in favor in interdisciplinarity as a study of structures. He was additionally a Darwinist along the lines advocated by Erwin Baur, which led him toward the informal study of human genetics.

=== Trăirist generation ===
Earning a doctorate in medicine and surgery (and also undergoing some further training at the University of Paris), Biberi was a primary-care psychiatrist. He lived a total of 38 years in his native city, including as chief physician at the shipyard's clinic, and many of his works use the city for their setting. A French-language columnist for Le Moment daily in Bucharest, Biberi won the Techirghiol-Eforie Prize (1935), the Fundațiile Regale Prize for the essay (1936), and the Romanian Writers' Society Prize (1938). His fiction was written from the perspective of a scientist interested in the psychological motivation of human experiences and the abysses of the subconscious. His first book as an essayist on psychological matters was Thanatos—published in 1936, when, as critic Mihai Stoian argues, his premonition of death and disaster was nearly validated. With this text, Biberi confessed to having pushed himself into a near-death experience; this episode was derided by the literary critic George Călinescu, sparking a wider public debate. Biberi, who recalls being defended in writing by Eliade, also responded to Călinescu in the newspaper Credința and in Floarea de Foc magazine.

Biberi's interwar output in creative prose included the modernist novel Proces ("Trial"), followed by a novella, Oameni în ceață ("People in the Fog"). These appeared in 1935 and 1937, respectively, with Oameni în ceață being issued as part of the "Oltenian writers" collection (itself an editorial imprint of Ramuri magazine in Craiova). Such contributions are seen by Cioculescu as paralleling Camil Petrescu's own brand of experimental literature, whereas literary historian Ovid S. Crohmălniceanu prioritizes their descent from Eminescu's fantasy writings. In Proces, which depicts a single, tragic, day in the life of a landowner accused of murder, all relevant details of the crime are omitted. The result, as described by literary critic Eugen Simion, is a "buildup of fragmented images, affixed to an immense board by one's burning, distorting intelligence." The "indisputably superior" Oameni în ceață samples "dramas of the pathological, the terrifying, the moral realm", such as in depicting a nightmarish city whose inhabitants are prevented from ever communicating with each other. Several scholars evidence Biberi's debt to James Joyce's brand of modernism—as with philologist Bianca Burța-Cernat, who sees Proces as a simplified and localized version of Joyce's novels. Biberi himself acknowledged that he had purposefully borrowed the stream of consciousness technique, noting that Eliade had once done the same. Simion includes Biberi among the followers of Joyce and Marcel Proust, with Proces mirroring the "aesthetic program" outlined by Ulysses. He also proposes that Biberi relied heavily on influences from outside the realm of literature, in that he closely adhered to Salvador Dalí's command—namely, that intellectuals should tap into "irrational knowledge".

Biberi's achievements were recognized in May 1936 by Eliade, who included him on a list of literary luminaries of the new generation—alongside Dan Botta, Ion Călugăru, Sergiu Dan, Lucia Demetrius, Anton Holban, Dan Petrașincu and Mihail Sebastian. A competing perspective, provided in 2011 by Burța-Cernat, argues that Biberi, like Demetrius and Petrașincu, was a "marginal" presence in 1930s "authenticist" (or Trăirist) literature, and as such inferior to the likes of Eliade and Sebastian. Also in 1936, Eliade highlighted the issue of the intellectuals' high rate of unemployment, describing himself, Holban and Biberi as among the few in that cohort who had managed to draw a salary. Biberi acknowledged that, because of his residing in the provinces, he could never join the Eliade-led "nucleus of writers", though he still responded to Eliade's own "personal radiance". He occasionally networked with writers in other regions, and, in October 1936, helped form the Group of Literary Critics. Formed around Perpessicius and Pompiliu Constantinescu, it was designed as a bulwark of artistic freedom against the threat of censorship from the emergent far-right. Its other members were Sebastian, Șerban Cioculescu, Vladimir Streinu, and Octav Șuluțiu.

Biberi was once described by Cioculescu as a writer of "humanistic formation", "a connoisseur, by virtue of his profession, of the labile human structures and behaviors". Sixty-six articles in Le Moment were grouped together as Études sur la littérature roumaine contemporaine, which appeared in 1937 at Corymbe publishers of Paris. In retrospect, Cioculescu noted: "Had he only ever published this as his one book, Ion Biberi would have justified in full his presence as a sober witness to, and serene judge of, Romanian letters." Zalis was impressed by the book's biographies (or, as he calls them, "silhouettes"), in particular for their recourse to self-interrogation and intertextuality. He draws parallels with two other interwar essayists, Mihai Ralea and Paul Zarifopol, who also employed their experience in various fields of art and science to construct their own essay forms; Biberi called this approach "cosmological", and explained that his model was Thomas Mann (viewing The Magic Mountain as an essay in the form of a novel). He notes that, though the Études were largely introductory and without critical depth, Biberi had occasional insights which remained culturally important—such as when discussing Arghezi's poetic virulence, Ion Vinea's aversion toward "academic tics", or Urmuz's resemblance to Franz Kafka. A chapter exalted Eliade as a writer "solidly planted in Romanian life", but of a "universalist tendency", and as "the most authentic literary personality of our generation".

Meanwhile, Biberi's professional investigations of the subconscious and the creative process appeared as Funcțiunile creatoare ale subconștientului (1938). In his overall thesis, he was attempting to reconcile Henri Bergson's explanation of mental patterns with the structuralists' core approach. This book was followed by an early contribution to art criticism. Dedicated to Pieter Bruegel as Bruegel ciudatul ("Bruegel the Odd", 1940), it was based on Biberi's dedicated research in Belgium and Federal Austria, where, by his own account, he had grown familiar with the entirety of Bruegel's output. In a 1969 piece, Simion proposed that Biberi belonged to a particular category that had populated the 19th century: as a "man of letters", he defined specialization; "his competence (or availability) extends from the creative functions of the subconscious mind to the issues of alcoholism." This trait was noted in the 1930s by culture critic Eugen Lovinescu, who, Simion observes, treated Biberi with a note of contempt and undeserved "cruel wit".

=== World War II and communist overtures ===
During the early stages of World War II, when Romania was still neutral, Biberi had established an informal literary club for Turnu Severin youths, acting as their guide in the profession. He discovered the future literary historian Emil Manu, inviting him to attend his conference "on writers and the provinces", held in Craiova in May 1940; others, including Constantin Fântâneru and Al. Raicu, were also present. From late 1940, Romania was governed as a dictatorship by Ion Antonescu, and aligned with the Axis powers. By early 1942, Biberi had interrupted his activities and had been drafted into the Land Forces as a military physician. At this stage, Romanian Jews such as Sebastian were made to perform menial labor and threatened with deportation into Transnistria. In such conditions, Sebastian focused his attention on writing a new play and in touch with Biberi, who lend him an astronomy book; the effort produced Sebastian's The Star Without a Name.

Both Biberi and Sebastian reemerged on the literary scene during the war's final stages—specifically, after the August 1944 coup and the start of a Soviet occupation. Biberi greeted the regime change with an article in Timpul on Christmas Day 1944, opining that: "there is a need to repair and rebuild, on the concrete, material field, but also to enrich mankind spiritually". As he saw it, the time had come for "optimistic literature, stripped of devices, of formal graces, or of useless preciousness, but opening itself to spiritual truth, to a writer's living substance". He and Sebastian were especially close until the latter's accidental death in January 1945. In Victoria newspaper, Biberi left notes on what were supposedly Sebastian's final literary projects, and also delivered his eulogy in front of the Free Democratic University. On 8 February 1945, Biberi was tasked by the Romanian State Radio with delivering a salute of the "Romanian democratic writers" to their colleagues in liberated France.

On 16 March 1945, Biberi and Petru Comarnescu were guest speakers at the National Theatre Bucharest, where they introduced the debuting author Miron Radu Paraschivescu—with the expressionistic play Asta-i ciudat. By June, Biberi had joined the leftist Union of Patriots (later "National Popular Party"), and was being announced as a speaker at its Bucharest meetings. One such rally had him as a speaker for the "democratic newspapermen", calling for "fascist journalists, who are the moral authors of all horrors committed by the war criminals," to be punished by the Romanian People's Tribunals. In October 1945, he appeared at the UP's committee in Ilfov County to introduce a lecture by painter M. H. Maxy.

Biberi himself authored twenty-two interviews with other intellectuals—as noted by historian Adrian Cioroianu, the selection was somewhat biased, reflecting Biberi's standing as a "rather left-wing man", willing to collaborate with the increasingly powerful Romanian Communist Party (PCR) (at least some of the interviewees were his personal friends). These were featured from October 1944 by Anton Dumitriu's newspaper Democrația, which spoke for leftist factions of the National Liberal Party. Biberi's texts therein were collected in 1945 as a bound book, Lumea de mâine ("World of Tomorrow"). Simion praises the result as the "document of an epoch", useful to "those wishing to gauge the moral temperature of that particular generation". Virgil Ierunca, at the time a columnist for the PCR's România Liberă, argued that Biberi's contribution "has the merit of being digestible even by his professional detractors, namely those who see his prodigious activity the signs of an ambiguous and external spending." According to Ierunca, Biberi found use for his psychological training in obtaining "self-examinations" from his guests.

As read by historian Lucian Boia, Lumea de mâine is a "glaring" historical record: though it refrains from openly criticizing either the PCR or the Soviet occupiers (and allows interviewees such as Mihail Sadoveanu to praise both), it still features an advocacy of intellectual freedom and liberal democracy, as expressed by Arghezi, George Enescu, and Grigore T. Popa. One noted twin interview is that with the Communist doctrinaire Lucrețiu Pătrășcanu (who, Cioroianu writes, was picked out by Biberi for his genuine popularity) and his sociologist brother-in-law, Petre Pandrea; herein, Pătrășcanu traces his intellectual autobiography. Literary historian Eugen Negrici highlights the book primarily as a sample of "naivete" on the part of those interviewees who "announced that Romania was entering the auspicious sign of democracy."

Biberi's other work for 1945 was an 1,600-page sociological tract called Individualitate și destin ("Individuality and Destiny"), which illustrated man's existence as a self-contradictory being, "unequally divided between need and liberty, between fixation into the relative and an aspiration for the absolute". Also that year, he collected his essays on French literature as Profiluri literare franceze ("French Literary Profiles"), covering the span between François Villon and Georges Simenon. A special section of the work was dedicated to the spread of German-invented "oneiric literature" in France. However, by August of the following year Biberi was being congratulated in the PCR's press for having discarded his own "oneiric cult" in favor of "the essay which encompasses a social environment." Also in 1946, he contributed an autofictional novel, Un om își trăiește viața ("A Man Living His Life"), with detail which Cioculescu recognized as being intimately connected to interwar Turnu Severin and its "politicking cancer". At Fundațiile Regale, he published the textbook Introducere în studiul eredității ("An Introduction to the Study of Heredity"), which received a positive review in România Liberă. On 15 November 1946, just short of that year's legislative election, he spoke on behalf of Romanian writers at congress of intellectuals at Savoy Hall, Bucharest, engaging in a dialogue with PCR General Secretary, Gheorghe Gheorghiu-Dej. On that day, the communist magazine Contemporanul featured his essay on "the ravages of mysticism among Romanian intellectuals". On 8 December of that year, Biberi also spoke at a festivity organized by the Ministry of Arts at Casa Capșa in celebration of the returning avant-garde writer and promoter Tristan Tzara.

In early 1947, Biberi and Mihail Calmâc completed a translation of Leo Tolstoy's Hadji Murat, taken up for publishing by Editura Cartea Rusă. In June, Biberi announced that he was preparing another installment of his studies in literary criticism. During August 1947, he was assigned to the Superior Council on Drama and Music, an organization established with support from the PCR, wherein he served as Director of Letters and Art Festivals. The same month, he became a knight second class of the Meritul Cultural order. Before the end of the year, Cartea Rusă put out Biberi's monograph on Tolstoy. It was welcomed as an "honest biography" by literary columnist Nicolae Steinhardt, since it fully uncovered Tolstoy's "bipolar structure". On 3 May, Biberi was scheduled to speak at the Romanian Society for Friendship with the Soviet Union, discussing Mikhail Sholokhov as an exponent of the "ethical novel". In November, he was conferencing at the Romanian–Soviet Institute of Studies on Alexander Pushkin as "the founder of Russian realism". Though he reportedly received a commission for a Pushkin monograph, it was never published. In early 1948, his "clean and elegant" translation of Voltaire's Candide was issued as a pocket edition by Editura de Stat.

=== Censorship and national-communist recovery ===
The communist regime, which was inaugurated in 1947–1948, reportedly had Biberi on its side. According to Cioculescu, he was himself a "theoretical artisan of the new man", seeing humankind as in need of "more equity and the more authentic human values." Communist writer Paul Georgescu provides a conflicting assessment: in his meetings with Biberi, the latter asserted that he could not confirm to either the surrounding people's democracy or to Marxism in general, and therefore that he would refrain from writing and also reduce his food consumption (since "the Japanese have determined that man eats 20 times more than what he needs"). This account was backed by another period witness, Marcel Marcian, who reports that the "non-Marxist" Biberi had a close connection to the liberal Marxist Felix Aderca, with both of them refusing to comply ideologically—while quietly accepting handouts of food from the Romanian Writers' Union (USR). On 1 July 1948, Biberi was stripped of his position at the Superior Council (then called Steering Council for the People's Theater), inaugurating his marginalization. An April 1957 article by the Marxist critic Ion Vitner revisited Proces as a "two-bit pastiche from Ulysses", and a sample of "false originality" in art. Initially assigned to the USR's translators' section, Biberi was purged in November 1959, after Zaharia Stancu heard reports that he was a political suspect, who had paused his literary activity in expectation of an American-organized regime change. He had tried to contest Stancu's decision, indicating that he was no longer writing not because he was a dissident, but because of a nervous illness; he was defended by Georgescu, who suggested that his political stance was essentially inoffensive: "[Biberi is] an honest man, who spells out his beliefs".

In a 1981 overview, writer Gheorghe Grigurcu spoke of Biberi and his generation colleagues as victims of Socialist Realism ("the devastating Proletkult") and its censorship apparatus. The interwar writers' cultural recovery, Grigurcu notes, was only possible in the mid-1960s, when there was a "gradual restoration of democratic conditions", coupled with a return to "our national tradition." The liberalizing and national-communist drift was heralded by Luceafărul magazine: as reported in 1983 by columnist Gheorghe Suciu, he and his colleagues took the initiative in recovering "some of our great contemporaries, who were being avoided or indexed [by the censors]". The category, as defined by Suciu, includes Biberi, Pandrea, Perpessicius and Streinu, as well as Alexandru Dima, Emil Giurgiuca, Edgar Papu, Ovidiu Papadima and Tudor Vianu. In a 1984 article, Dan Culcer similarly spoke of the "democratization of public life" as a determinant for the rediscovery and republishing of interwar essayists—including Biberi, Eliade and Sebastian, but also Pătrășcanu, Dan Botta, Ionel Gherea, Mihai Ralea, and D. I. Suchianu.

In November 1964, the USR's Gazeta Literară featured Biberi's article on Joyce. By 1966, that magazine was hosting his "micro-essays" of theater criticism, in which he expressed his concerns about the artistic purity of various productions. It also hosted his return as an interviewer, including a late 1966 debate with sociologist Henri H. Stahl. It was poorly reviewed by Cronica magazine, which argued that Biberi had been excessively encomiastic toward his guest, and had failed to even probe Stahl regarding the work of other sociologists. In April 1966, the PCR's organ Scînteia hosted some of Biberi's thoughts on human development in a "socialist society [which emphasizes] social progress and the development of human personality alike". As he noted therein, he had prepared a monograph on alcoholism for Editura Medicală, which also featured his instructions on achieving "mental hygiene"; overall, he proposed the "rationalization of corporeal existence". Biberi's interwar prose was being reissued and reassessed, with Simion noting that it could be recovered as a template by the younger "Onirist" writers. In 1967, Biberi illustrated his aesthetic principles with a psychological drama centered on the historical character Hannibal; it bridges into pantomime, displaying Hannibal next to a silent character playing out his emotional states. It was panned by fellow critic N. Irimescu, in particular for the dialogue, which was closely based on passages from Ab urbe condita. Irimescu asks: "What is the point of all this? A work of drama just to highlight an encyclopedist's facile 'erudition'?" In early 1973, the state broadcasting company produced a radio play, Sărmanul Dionis, adapted by Biberi from Eminescu's 1872 novella.

Biberi could now publish books, including a biography of Vianu (1966), essays (Poezia, mod de existență, 1968; Argonauții viitorului, 1971; Essai sur la condition humaine, 1973; Eros, 1974), works on literary aesthetics, dialogues, another book of interviews (Orizonturi spirituale, 1968), and anthologies (Nuvela romantică germană, 1968). His comeback as a biographer was controversial: fellow research Ion Panait observed that his work on Vianu, taking the form of "genetic" textualism, was hurriedly written. According to Panait, Biberi had refused to go over essential texts by Vianu, and had mistakenly labeled drafts of published lectures as undiscovered manuscripts. The volume was praised by philologist Ioana Lipovanu in Scînteia, in particular for Biberi's biographical skill in tracing Vianu's transition from idealism to dialectical materialism, but also in using photographic documents for uncovering his subject's "inner world". Biberi's next and final monograph came in 1974, and was dedicated to the graphical works of a theatrical director, Ion Sava. Published by Editura Meridiane, its nucleus was Sava's exhibition catalogue, also penned by Biberi; journalist Aurel Leon expressed his partial disappointment, describing it as "rather tiny", "seemingly part of a larger whole that is yet to come."

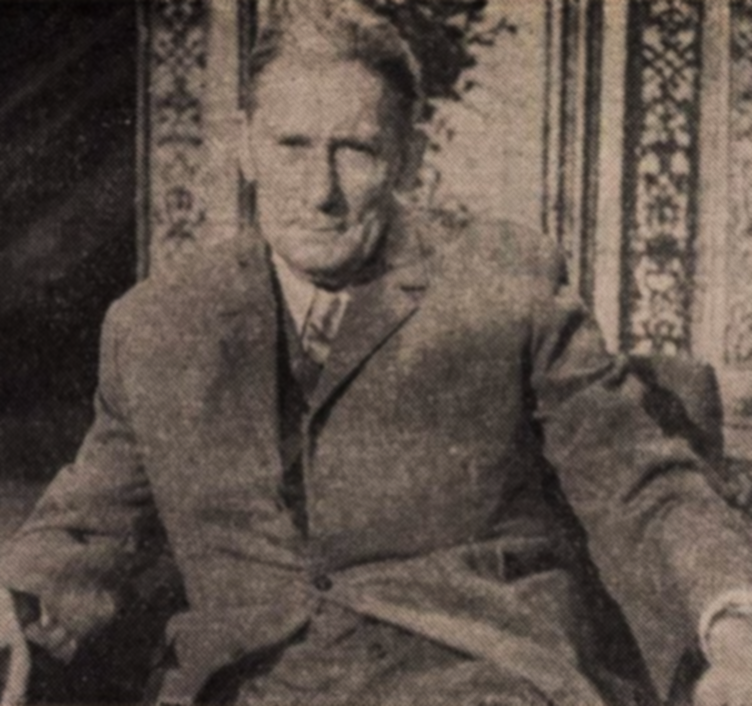
Biberi in 1979

In December 1969, the national television channel had Biberi appear on one of its talk shows—where he discussed on the topic on "art and cybernetics" with engineer Edmond Nicolau and actor-poet Emil Botta. Biberi was also publishing numerous scientific articles, some grouped in 1970 as Visul și structurile subconștientului ("Dream and the Structures of the Subconscious"). Part of it was built on his own activity as a folklorist in Mehedinți County (around Turnu Severin), where he had uncovered samples of dream interpretation. One of his specialized fields was art criticism, and specifically its branching into the realm of fantasy; he authored introductions to Surrealism (appearing in 1973, and seen by Cioculescu as "remarkable"), and to the work of Hieronymus Bosch.

In addition to his applied textualism, the scholar was interested in psycholinguistics. This topic formed a separate chapter of his 1972 instructional manual on rhetoric, Arta de a scrie și de a vorbi in public. Biberi's Poezia, mod de existență was welcomed by fellow scholar Nicolae Balotă as a "rigorously scientific" contribution to poetics, which Biberi analyzed within their anthropological, psychological, or ethnic context (though without embracing phenomenalism). Biberi's hypothesis (reviewed by Balotă with some skepticism) was that poetic language had emerged from the veneration of the dead, with its original function being ritualistic and mnemonic; beyond this, he commented on the origin of language, speculating that humans had differentiated early on between regular and incantational speech, with the latter surviving into poetry. On this basis, he differentiated between two eternal currents in poetry—one which focused on the ability of poetic language to depict "incandescent states of mind", and the other centered on the "search for authenticity " and "immediacy" in expressing the self.

=== Final years ===
On a more generic level, Biberi contributed a textbook of psychological anthropology, issued at Editura didactică și pedagogică in 1971. He also wrote the 1973 self-help manual for young readers, Arta de a trăi ("Art of Living"), which, as noted at the time by columnist Ion Cristoiu, was condescending, and mainly based on his lifelong experience. Cristoiu found his advice questionable and mundane, particularly since Biberi took pride in "always walk[ing] with my eyes firmly on the ground, so as not to step on some insect." In 1969–1979, Biberi proceeded with a companion to Lumea de mâine, titled Lumea de azi ("World of Today")—and originating as a set of interviews over national radio. While most interviewees were intellectual personalities, one was an industrial boilermaker, Gheorghe Burcică. As noted in 2002 by political scientist Ioan Stanomir, this volume unwittingly documents a decline of national communism, from the promise of a limited liberalization to the reinforcement of "obedience"; the interviewer emphasized this transition by subscribing to the process of social engineering, emphasizing the emergence of intellectuals from among the workers, and entirely loyal to the working class. Through dialogues with Grigore Moisil and other leading scientists, Lumea de azi revealed that the regime was lifting censorship on various fields of scientific inquiry, notably genetics and cybernetics, with Biberi expressing confidence that Romania was joining the world's scientific elite. The conversations also sample the author's own musings about urban sociology and the "nervous balance" of modern workers—as Stanomir notes, he effectively endorsed the policy of systematization.

Biberi was a recipient of the USR Special Prize (1979); in 1981, he returned with the extended essay Permanențele clepsidrei ("Perennials of the Clepsydra"), which, though nominally put out by a company called Editura Litera, was in fact self-published. Here, Biberi explained his and his generation's transition from Eliade's discovery of myth as a noumenon, through a limited rediscovery of positivism, and finally through a confrontation with the limitations of scientific knowledge. As the author put it, his Eliadesque generation had been forced to reconsider the universe upon the discovery of the uncertainty principle and the scholarly acceptance of indeterminism. He postulated that man's nature lacked a "cosmological perspective" unless elevated through culture, and proposed that the study of astronomy was a helpful step in culture-building. Biberi, who recalled that the notion of "cosmic man" had been used independently by Eliade, only met the latter, who had settled abroad, "one more time, in Paris, at some point in 1972–1974. [...] The meeting was kept short. We exchanged some pleasantries. We gifted each other some of the books we published. A third-party stepped in, preventing us from forming an atmosphere of somber, meditating, intimacy, as would have befitted our years of separation".

Another book of Biberi's collected essays (Eseuri filosofice și artistice) appeared in 1982. It was praised by literary historian Jenő Farkas for its interdisciplinary competence in uncovering the mechanisms of individual creativity, sometimes intertwined with discussion of a writer's pathology—the essays focused on individual cases, from Hoffman, Poe, Goethe and William Blake to Fyodor Dostoevsky and August Strindberg. Farkas, who noted that Biberi's take on Hoffman's productive alcoholism was particularly "brilliant", also expressed admiration for his interest in the "archetypes of fantasy as thought", which set him apart from sociological investigators of fantasy tropes (examples of the latter include Marcel Brion, Roger Caillois, Pierre Castex, and Tzvetan Todorov).

Biberi completed what he saw a literary cycle with the 1985 collection, Ultime eseuri ("Final Essays"). Interviewed by George Chirilă upon its publication, he spoke of his sadness at having lost his lifelong partner, Antoinette Langet, crediting her as one of the major reasons for his own success "as a man and as an intellectual." As reported by Stoian, his was a "discreet fading-away"; he spent his days on park benches, in "bewildering silence", sometimes alongside his publisher and fellow novelist, Radu Albala. He died on 27 September 1990, almost one year after the Romanian Revolution had toppled communism.

== Legacy ==
According to Cioculescu, by 1979 Biberi had published over thirty books, including translations from other authors. Stoian counts fifty-one titles, and suggests that they only represented 10% of Biberi's literary output. Unpublished manuscripts he left include another novel, centered on the circumstances of World War I, a Dalí monograph, and a book of memoirs. Among those who revisited his work in the following decades, Zalis noted that he was only rarely remembered as an essayist. He added: "I hold the conviction that the refusal to even mention his name these past years is owed to his failure at practicing criticism with enough perseverance." In 2002, Stoian called Biberi "unduly forgotten". Two years later, the author's centennial was celebrated at Sfânta Ana Monastery in Orșova, as part of the Sensul Iubirii festival in Mehedinți.
