= Biberi =

Biberi is a surname. Notable people with the surname include:

- Ion Biberi (1904–1990), Romanian writer and literary critic
- James Biberi (born 1965), Albanian-American actor
