= Viperești oil field =

Oil field in Buzău County, Romania

Viperești
- Location within Romania
- Country: Romania
- Region: Buzău County
- Offshore/onshore: onshore
- Coordinates: 45.2197°N 26.4138°E
- Operator: Toreador Resources

Field history
- Discovery: 2006
- Start of development: 2006
- Start of production: 2015

Production
- Current production of oil: 2,000 barrels per day (~100,000 t/a)
- Estimated oil in place: 13.9 million tonnes (~ 16.7×10^{6} m^{3} or 105 million bbl)

The Viperești oil field is an oil field in Viperești, Buzău County, Romania. It was discovered in 2006 and developed by Toreador Resources. It will begin production in 2015 and will produce oil. The total proven reserves of the Viperești oil field are around 105 million barrels (13.9 million tonnes), and production will be centered on 2,000 barrels per day (320 m^{3}/d).
