= D. I. Suchianu =

Romanian writer, economist and politician (1895–1985)

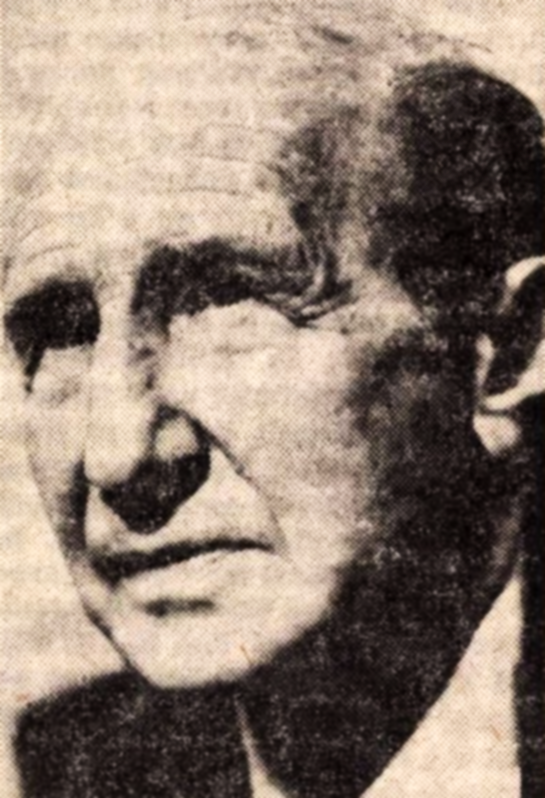
- Suchianu in 1969
- Born: Ion Suchianu; September 2, 1895; Iași, Kingdom of Romania
- Died: April 18, 1985 (aged 89); Bucharest, Socialist Republic of Romania
- Occupations: Academic; civil servant; journalist; editor; translator; ski instructor
- Writing career
- Period: c. 1914–1985
- Genres: Essay; biography; memoir; autobiography
- Movement: Viața Romînească

Dumitru Ion Suchianu or Sucheanu, most often shortened to D. I. Suchianu or D.I.S. (2 September 1895 – 17/18 April 1985), was a Romanian essayist, translator, economist and film theorist, also noted for his participation in politics. The son of a distinguished Armenian teacher-editor and his Romanian socialist wife, he was acquainted with, and inspired by, writer Ion Luca Caragiale, who visited his childhood home. Attending Iași's Boarding High School in the 1910s, he formed a lasting bond with Mihai Ralea. The two young men went on to study together at the University of Paris, where they earned their credentials as social scientists and political thinkers; Ralea also married Suchianu's sister Ioana. Their careers were tied to Viața Romînească magazine, put out by their mentor Garabet Ibrăileanu. It was here and in Adevărul newspaper that Suchianu made his reputation as a polemicist and essayist. His early writings tackled a variety of subjects, from political biographies and world affairs to legal history, a subject which also preoccupied him during his successive mandates at the Legislative Council. After 1927, he became directly involved in the ideological and aesthetic steering of Romanian cinema, as a columnist, film historian, censor, and eventually producer.

Though publicly critical of Marxism, Suchianu established connections with the underground Romanian Communist Party during his stint at Cuvântul Liber newspaper. He continued to cultivate and defend communist intellectuals after taking over as co-editor of Viața Romînească in 1937, though he also struck controversy with his positive remarks on the fascist Iron Guard. In 1938, he and Ralea were co-opted by the dictatorial King Carol II, serving within his National Renaissance Front. Suchianu merged his positions at the Labor Ministry, held by Ralea, and the Ministry of Propaganda to establish a program of mass entertainment for the Romanian proletariat—the film component of a Muncă și Voe Bună leisure-package. He visited Nazi Germany and Fascist Italy to seek his inspiration, while explaining that he still did not favor the complete fascization of Romania. Suchianu was ultimately sacked in mid-1940 by Prime Minister Ion Gigurtu, with prosecutors sent in to investigate him as an alleged embezzler. This uncertain status was prolonged during the National Legionary State, established by the Iron Guard in 1940–1941, and then under the early years of the Ion Antonescu regime. He was never brought to trial, and Antonescu eventually allowed him to travel throughout Nazi-occupied Europe; this episode left Suchianu exposed to accusations of collaborationism.

Suchianu said he had secretly supported the Soviet Union, and also that he had directly participated in the August 1944 coup, which toppled Antonescu. He continued the leftward shift at Viața Romînească, with a new edition put out in 1944–1948, while also engaged in propaganda work for the National Populars, as well as for the Communist Party's own Bloc of Democratic Parties. He renounced his journalistic activities upon the imposition of a communist regime in 1948, and withdrew from literary activity altogether, until 1956; he was also imprisoned for a while, possibly as a means of ensuring Ralea's own political compliance. When he reemerged, it was almost exclusively as a translator and film critic, earning particular distinction, and the reading public's enduring affection, in the latter field. His essays mounted an academic defense of Hollywood crowd-pleasers against the cinematic avant-garde, and overlapped with affectionate memoirs of the silent film era.

Late-communist reviewers celebrated Suchianu as a founding figure of Romanian film criticism, and, in some cases, identified him as a fellow student of Marxism-Leninism—though he was already a public critic of communist censors. His critical views of communism became known to the public from his 1980s interviews with Grid Modorcea, in the uncensored version published after the 1989 Revolution. An avid practitioner of various sports, and a certified ski instructor, Suchianu earned additional notoriety for his longevity and well-preserved agility, outliving Ralea by 20 years. He died at the age of 89, having continued to write until his last days.

== Biography ==
=== Early life and debut ===
Suchianu was a native of Iași, though some sources also have Bucharest as his place of origin. He was from an intellectual and cosmopolitan family: his father, Hanes-Ogias (or Ioan) Suchianu, was a professor of Armenian ethnicity, and his Romanian mother was Lelia, née Nanu-Muscel. The family surname is exclusively Armenian, from the Romanianized spelling of the given name Soukias (Սուքիաս). Suchianu Sr, originally from Focșani, took a position at Saint Sava National College in Bucharest, and became close friends with the celebrated comedic writer Ion Luca Caragiale. In 1898, he also published and prefaced the collected poems of Costache Bălăcescu. Lelia, an aspiring actress during her student years at Elena Doamna School, had also been a militant of the Social Democratic Workers' Party, animating its fetele partidului ("girls of the party") wing alongside Izabela Sadoveanu-Evan. She married Hanes in February 1894, at Domnița Bălașa Church.

The future author was first registered as "Ion Suchianu", but "Dumitru" was added during his baptism into the Romanian Orthodox Church. As he recounted in 1974, his godfather, General Dimitrie Lambru, had been nudged by Caragiale into naming as many children as possible with variants of "Demetrius", which would result in the spread of its pet form, Mitică, as a national name. Young Suchianu boasted having met Caragiale in his father's home, learning from him how to be the "consummate showman" (om-spectacol), as well as embracing Caragiale's philosemitism. He attended high school in Bucharest and at the modern language section of the Boarding High School in his native city, from which he graduated in 1914. Those years saw his first involvement in amateur sports, including swimming, diving, and figure skating—he was a school champion in the latter field.

Also a passionate reader, he reports having taken top honors at its "modern" section, on par with Horia Hulubei for "sciences" and his lifelong friend Mihai Ralea in "classics". He and Ralea also bonded over a shared curiosity for the café-chantant, which led them to escape the boarding house on at least one occasion. Together, the two boys planned to write a French-language book outlining their shared views on human intelligence; its working title was L'honneur de comprendre ("The Honor in Understanding"). Suchianu recalled: "We never wrote the book, but the wish to be truly intelligent stuck with us for a lifetime." Also according to Suchianu, they became familiarized with leftist literature, and discovered a shared interest in Marxism after reading the introductory studies of Charles Gide and Gabriel Deville. Suchianu's subsequently enlisted at the University of Iași, but interrupted his studies during the Romanian Campaign of World War I (1916–1918). He went to a preparatory school of the Romanian Land Forces, in Botoșani, where he was colleagues with Ralea, as well as with other cultural figures—including Tudor Vianu, Ionel Teodoreanu, and Mihai Moșandrei. He then served in the same artillery battery as Ralea.

Suchianu then earned a degree in law, literature and philosophy at Iași, followed by a doctorate in political and economic sciences from the University of Paris. For much of this period, Dumitru and his sister Ioana lived together with Ralea at the Résidence Parisiana, Rue Tournefort 4, in the 5th arrondissement of Paris; Ioana later became Ralea's wife. Suchianu frequented a larger literary circle which included Vianu and poet Ion Barbu (he left anecdotes about the former's complete admiration for the latter), and also networked with actress Marioara Ventura, in whose home he met the politician Joseph Paul-Boncour. Suchianu's debut as a published translator came in 1919, when Fapta magazine hosted two of his renditions from Maurice Maeterlinck. His subsequent activity as a critic began in the Viața Romînească circle; he made his published debut in its pages, with a 1921 study on Thomas Hardy. This earned him the graces of Viața Romînească's founder, Garabet Ibrăileanu, who also appreciated that both he and the Suchianus had Armenian roots. Suchianu became a personal witness to the lives of Iași's more successful literary figures, including Mihail Sadoveanu and George Topîrceanu (with whom he played volleyball), as well as Teodoreanu (who left notes on Suchianu's everyday showmanship). From 1922, he was regularly featured in the left-wing sister dailies, Adevărul and Dimineața, as well as a large number of other publications, sometimes using pen names such as "M. Suchianu" and "Margareta Popescu".

Upon graduation, Suchianu was made associate professor at the law faculty of the University of Bucharest, in the department of social doctrines. He was full professor at the Higher War School and at the Fine Arts Academy (where he established a Chair of Aesthetics), as well as professor of political economy and finance at the State Sciences School. He also worked as a magistrate, from 1926 to 1948. He wrote frequently on a variety of topics, including philosophy, literature, aesthetics, sociology, psychology and cinematography, especially in Viața Romînească and Universul Literar. According to his own records, in 1921 he published a set of social and political studies, which included warnings about the potential emergence of Nazism. A March 1922 article of his in Viața Romînească gave exposure to the late Alexandru Ciurcu's critique of the universal suffrage. It was published with a note in which the editorial staff clarified that it did not endorse Ciurcu's ideas, also praising Suchianu as a man of "outstanding literary talent [and] splendid youth". The following year, he wrote a piece targeting France's extreme-right, focused especially on exposing Léon Daudet as a "maniac". This contribution, published by Adevărul, was favorably sampled in Anatole France's La République.

=== Interwar culture critic ===
Later in 1923, Suchianu introduced the Romanian public to Émile Durkheim's outlook on values, suggesting that the bourgeoisie could rally around rationalism or scientism, while the lower classes could be socialized into faith, as long as these two forms of education cultivated "the same ideal". He commended the Austrian Republic for its manner of resolving the postwar economic recession. Following Charles Rist, he argued that the Austrian solution had been a combination of government-induced hyperinflation, wage regulation, and selective nationalization. Adevărul also hosted his notes on the genesis and "abnormality" of Romanian capitalism, as compared to Western standards. He claimed to have amended the Orthodox Marxism proposed by Lothar Rădăceanu, though Rădăceanu himself contended that their positions were virtually identical (and, as such, derived from ideas first advanced by Constantin Dobrogeanu-Gherea). Against the governing National Liberals, and in line with dissenting economists such as Mihail Manoilescu and Grigore Trancu-Iași, Suchianu supported foreign investments. His stance was ridiculed by jurist Mihail Pașcanu in the National Liberal paper Viitorul: "young Suchianu [has] elevated himself as a Cato of the Romanian mindset, which he censures down to its minutest manifestations."

Bibliographies report Suchianu's first book as the 1928 collection of literary studies Aspecte literare ("Literary Aspects"). It contained his musings on various modern developments, analyzed literary works by (among others) Otilia Cazimir and Jean Giradoux, and elaborated on Ralea's own theories about Henri Bergson. Also that year, he and Ioan C. Filitti co-wrote a tract on the legal history of Wallachia and Moldavia: Contribuții la istoria justiției penale în Principatele române. Theologian Gheorghe Racoveanu described it as a "valuable contribution" and obligatory reading for all those interested in the "history of justice as applied by the Romanians." On 14 January 1929, Suchianu was confirmed a titular clerk at the Legislative Council, in the First Section. On 23 January of the following year, he became a permanent counselor of its Historical and Economic Studies Bureau, but by February 1935 had been demoted back to titular clerk at the same section (supervised by Filitti). During that interval, he wrote three volumes of political economy: Introducere în economia politică ("An Introduction to Political Economy", 1930), Manual de sociologie ("A Textbook of Sociology", 1931) and Despre avuție ("On Wealth"). Suchianu cherished these contributions into his old age, noting of the former that it was directed at educating Romania's workers; it presented the prices of various goods as human beings, each with their own peculiarities.

Suchianu had his debut as a dramaturge in October 1929, when his translation of Paul Raynal's comedy, Le Maître de son cœur, was taken up for production by Ventura's Bucharest troupe. He also discovered his passion for cinema early on, later claiming that he knew every detail of film history, "beginning with Workers Leaving the Lumière Factory". Other critics noted the coincidence of his having been born as the latter film was being released, making Suchianu exactly as old as cinema itself. In a 1934 article, Suchianu stated the claim that Romania had invented the cinema chronicle around 1925, when films were dedicated a specialized column in the literary supplement of Adevărul. Both this account, and his self-reported pioneering role in the field, were revised in 1987 by film theorist Manuela Cernat. She traces the origin of Romanian film criticism to 1911–1912.

Suchianu himself took over as the columnist in 1927, at both Adevărul and the film magazine Cinema, which was being put out by Nestor Cassvan and Alexandru Graur. As noted in 1939 by Sadoveanu's journalist daughter, Profira, he had become a trendsetter, making moviegoers shun André Hugon's Tenderness and queue for tickets to La Grande Illusion. By his own admission, Suchianu had felt provoked to take up the activity after reading an article by the Frenchman Paul Souday, which denied that cinema was even an art form. He admitted however that most films Romanians were watching were of the basest variety: "We wish it with all our heart that our cinema-goers [...] would lose their habit of falling asleep whenever they're not shown a naked breast, a hip that's getting some action, or a character who's turned millionaire overnight." Cinephilia informed his other works, allowing him to write his sociology textbook as a montage of quotes, with no editorial comment of his own. He held the belief that cinema was in fact literature, in the same that a rondeau is a form of poetry. A member of the film censorship committee from 1929 to 1941, Suchianu held courses on cinematography (Romania's first) and promoted the discipline through his Curs de Cinematograf. Published in 1931, it commented on the aesthetic superiority of silent film, since "talking dispels dreams". Suchianu also advocated for "restricted grounds" with an "alphabet all its own", urging directors not to bring into the cinema "the legitimate play and the dramatized novel".

After 1933, Suchianu became a regular contributor to Cuvântul Liber, put out by Tudor Teodorescu-Braniște and reportedly influenced by the underground Romanian Communist Party. His contributions there included a mock-denunciation of himself as a tool for Jewish interests, or Vândut jidanilor ("A Hireling of the Kikes"). His initial cultural and political positions were not entirely hostile to the Soviet Union—in 1934, he worried that the temporary Romanian–Soviet rapprochement would result in "every Tom, Dick and Harry in our culture explaining to us their sympathetic views on the goings-on in Russia"; however, he saw it is a positive that locals could expect direct exposure to Soviet cinema. From 1936, his film columns were syndicated by the French-language Bucharest paper, Le Moment. Suchianu wrote several books of essays: Puncte de vedere ("Points of View", 1930), Diverse însemnări și amintiri ("Some Records and Memoirs", 1933), Amica mea Europa ("My Friend Europe", 1939). As biographers such as Radu G. Țeposu and Ileana Ciocârlie note, these are marked by erudition and style, subtle observation and deft analogies; they also employ ideas and information in an elevated intellectual manner. Suchianu himself was self-effacing, noting in 1974 that such works had been proven wrong, though he later also took pride that his essay on "stupidity as a technique" had been well-liked by the more senior culture critic, Paul Zarifopol.

=== Fascist overtures ===
Suchianu and Ralea co-directed Viața Romînească from 1937 to 1940; the magazine's founder, Ibrăileanu, had died in 1936 at a sanitarium, after a long illness during which Suchianu had stood by his bedside. As editor, Suchianu claimed to have personally ensured an extension of the literary and political circle, obtaining paid contributions from Graur, Geo Bogza, Miron Constantinescu, Lucrețiu Pătrășcanu, and Gogu Rădulescu; this was partly confirmed by Pătrășcanu, who also noted that, in 1937, Suchianu had asked to be accepted into the Communist Party. Overall, as Suchianu reported, "all communist intellectuals, or intellectuals who sympathized with the [communist] party, were permanent contributors." Also joining the panel were dramatist Mihail Sebastian and poet Dumitru Corbea. As recalled by the latter, Suchianu was, with Sebastian, one of "two pillars" of the circle in this late-interwar stage, and engaged Ralea in "disputes of the most heated kind". Suchianu's other activities, and especially his more political writings, soon became tinged by controversy. Journalist A. Bucur notes that, in October 1937, Suchianu wrote in Parlamentul Românesc about the various doctrines competing in the coming elections, with some praise reserved for the far-right Iron Guard—though generally favoring the National Peasants' Party (PNȚ) as a "most balanced" force in society. It characterized the Guard's rhetoric as "simplistic", but also noted that its followers were genuinely committed to a "moral regeneration"; if it discouraged Guardist agitation, it was only because it could also legitimize a "socialist uprising, plainly communist in its scope".

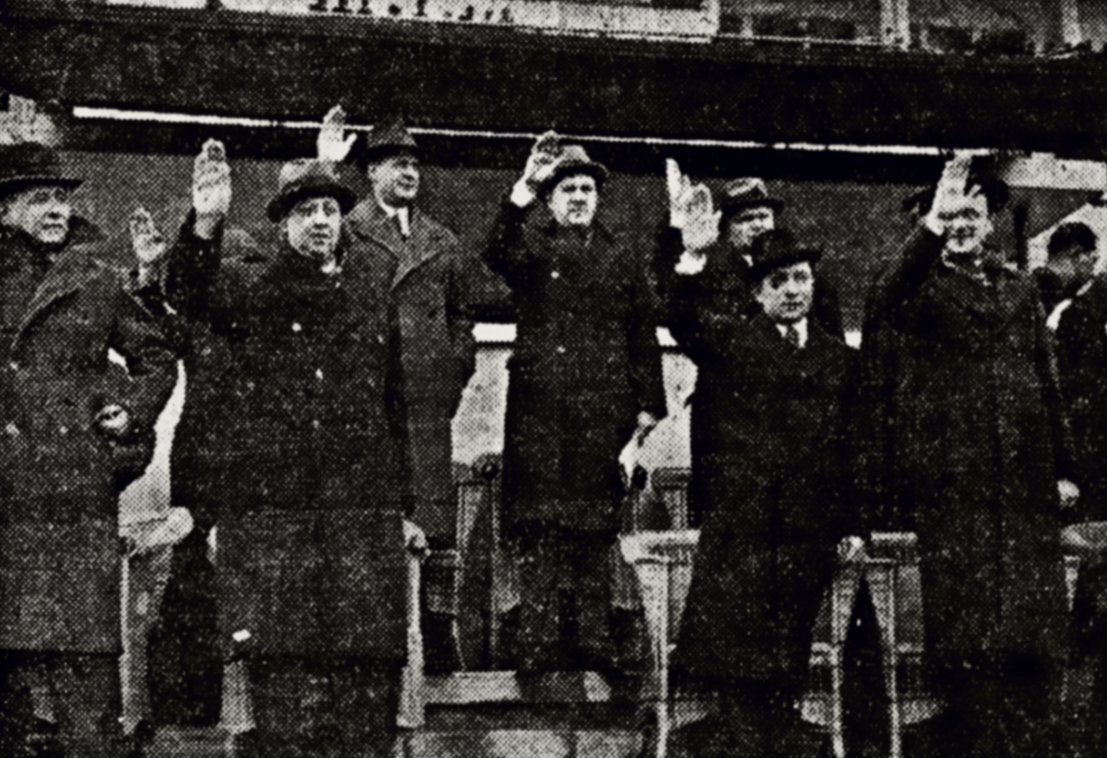
Ralea and staff of Muncă și Voe Bună (including Suchianu) at ANEF Stadium, doing the Roman salute

The self-coup staged by King Carol II in 1938, and then the establishment of single-party rule under the National Renaissance Front (FRN), did not negatively affect Suchianu's career, since Ralea remained politically well connected; while many left-liberal newspapers were banned, Ralea's disciples, including Suchianu and Demostene Botez, were allowed to publish essays in Adevărul Literar și Artistic, down to May 1939. In early 1938, Suchianu used his high standing to secure a light sentence for Ștefan Voicu, who had been prosecuted for collecting information on Romania's readiness for war, disguised as a report on economic conjecture. Suchianu went to Voicu's trial as a defense witness, despite a broken leg; according to Voicu, he also helped the communist cause by pretending that the report was a banal essay for Viața Românească.

In mid-1938, Suchianu took over as head of the National Film Office, in which capacity he founded and co-wrote a magazine, Film, which reviewed the week's premieres. Effective on 1 August, Carol appointed him permanent counselor of the Legislative Council, where he replaced Alexandru P. Gane. He was also collaborating with the Labor Ministry, held by Ralea, on forming the national leisure service, Muncă și Voe Bună (MVB). In August 1938, he and Victor Ion Popa went on an MVB study trip of the Jiu Valley, the Prahova Valley, and Ținutul Timiș, to observe how industrial workers were spending their free time. He spoke admiringly of Nazi Germany's Strength Through Joy (KdF) programs, quoting one of their artisans on the need to have "thing[s] of the best quality" set aside for the workers, including in the field of cinema. In an interview with the official paper România, Suchianu made note that the MVB was unlike both the KdF and Fascist Italy's Opera Nazionale Dopolavoro, since the latter two were "totalitarian", "socialist", and unsuited to the Romanian mindset. He commended Nazism for having eliminated class conflict, which he described as a Marxist obsession, but noted that Germany aimed for the "eradication of all individual thinking". In November, the same newspaper announced, through Eugen Jebeleanu's editorial comments, that Suchianu was working on producing a set of "Dopolavorist" films.

Late that year, Suchianu and his film crew were in Sinaia, to document the exploits of alpine skiers James Couttet and Maurice Lafforgue. He recalls a tense encounter with General Emil Pălăngeanu, who managed the event, and who snubbed his cameramen. He had occasional contributions as a sports journalist in Revista Fundațiilor Regale, where, in March 1939, he discussed Émile Allais and developments in French skiing. That year, he established and directed his own magazine of cinema criticism, as Film. He also took a tour of Europe's cinema powerhouses, with stops at Babelsberg, Joinville and Denham. In July, he was scheduled to attend the Venice Film Festival, as head of the first-ever Romanian delegation there.

From October 1939, Suchianu and his leftist group were employed by Teodorescu-Braniște's Jurnalul. As historian Lucian Boia notes, they continued to air left-wing opinions, specifically supporting Carol's repression of the Iron Guard. There were still creative differences within this group, with a fellow leftist, the literary critic George Călinescu, reserving some sarcastic remarks about the all-knowing nature of Suchianu's essays; these appeared in Călinescu's overview of Romanian literature, published in 1941. During the Winter War of 1939–1940, public opinion in Romania (as noted by Suchianu himself) was firmly on the side of Finland, and against the Soviets' "rapacity". According to Suchianu, this was also the case with Viața Romînească, which was then managed by an anti-Soviet Constantin Vișoianu; he claims to have gotten Vișoianu sacked, and the magazine itself banned on Carol's orders, when he inserted an article that was strongly anti-Finnish in content. Suchianu also claims that his merits were recognized by the staff of the Soviet Embassy in Bucharest.

=== World War II ===
By March 1940, Suchianu was supervisor of the local film industry (Director al Cinematografiei) under Minister of Propaganda Constantin C. Giurescu. That month, he became a Grande croix of the French Legion of Honor, and was fêted by the film importers at Casa Capșa; he had by then also joined the FRN and had donned its uniform. On 12 July 1940, after Nichifor Crainic had taken replaced Giurescu, Suchianu oversaw a ceremony whereby all ministerial staff joined the enlarged FRN, now called "Party of the Nation". By then, an investigation had been launched against Eugen Titeanu, General Secretary of the Propaganda Ministry, who stood accused of embezzlement. Suchianu was also caught up in the affair: on 18 July, Prime Minister Ion Gigurtu removed him from his post, with retroactive effect—backdating his demotion to 4 July. In his recollections, Suchianu spoke of Gigurtu's decision as: "the Nazis had me sacked." He was allowed by Ralea to enter the MVB as a councilor. In September, Carol was ousted and the FRN dissolved, with the Guard establishing a "National Legionary State". The new Labor Minister, Vasile Iașinschi, had him immediately sacked. By January 1941, this new regime was organizing an investigation into the activity of Carlist bureaucrats; the Propaganda Ministry team, including Titeanu and Suchianu, was still formally indicted for criminal acts, though, as noted by journalist Ion I. Nedelescu, the prosecution had fumbled the case.

The investigation dragged on even after the Guard's fall from power. In April 1941, with Romania ruled upon by the military regime of Ion Antonescu and aligned with Germany, Suchianu was being formally prosecuted for allegedly embezzling 282,000 lei while employed by the Propaganda Ministry. Film historian Valerian Sava believes that he was still being censored in 1943, which prevented him from chronicling Jean Georgescu's O noapte furtunoasă, now seen as a masterpiece of Romanian cinema. The Jewish diarist Emil Dorian, who joined Suchianu and Ralea for a "tea-party" in December 1941, recalls the former was no longer praising Adolf Hitler, as he had in 1938, but had switched back to the Marxist lingo; at the same gathering, Ralea revealed to his peers details of the ongoing Holocaust crimes, estimating that Romanians had killed some 200,000 Bessarabian Jews, and were thus going to collectively punished by the Allied powers.

Suchianu's activities during Antonescu and the remainder of World War II were the focus of scrutiny by his political adversaries, who described Suchianu as a profiteer. In 1942, he took a study trip throughout Nazi-occupied Europe, also stopping over in Italy. Some four years later, the PNȚ's Dreptatea newspaper publicized claims that he had been sponsored to research fascist legislation; Suchianu defended himself with an article in Națiunea, arguing that he never completed such an assignment, and that he was in fact a liaison with the French Resistance. Dismissing this claim as self-serving fabrication, Dreptatea alleged that Suchianu was in fact mainly active as an "economic collaborationist", one of Antonescu's "middlemen and jobbers" (samsari și misiți), but also that he ran errands for his wife, Florica, who had founded a film distribution company. She had remained the sole owner after her Jewish associate, E. Follender, had been deported by Antonescu to Transnistria.

Pătrășcanu, whom Antonescu was keeping under house arrest at Poiana Țapului, but allowed to carry on with his work as a social theorist, confirmed that most of the books he used were sent to him by Suchianu. During the next-to-final stage of the world war, Suchianu supported Ralea's effort to coalesce left-wing groups in opposition to Antonescu and the Axis powers in general. A Siguranța report of 27 June 1944 mentions that Ralea's underground Socialist Peasants' Party had received pledges from Suchianu, Botez, Scarlat Callimachi, and N. D. Cocea. Antonescu was toppled by the August 1944 coup, which saw Romania joining the Allies. Suchianu claimed to have been personally involved in "conspiratorial activity" leading up to these events, and noted that Sebastian was also marginally involved, as the author of pro-Soviet propaganda. Soon after, when Sebastian was mortally wounded by a truck, Suchianu attended his funeral.

=== Under communization ===
In November 1944, Viața Romînească was allowed to reemerge, and Suchianu was its co-editor, as well as co-owner, alongside Ralea; he was also a contributor from the new series' first issue, with an introduction to thanatology. Suchianu had always intended to take up the study of psychology, which he defined as a "study of death"—he viewed death as a "short-circuit", which arrives when a man is reduced to only one psychological state. This contribution was negatively reviewed by writer Ion Călugăru in the Communist Party's Scînteia. According to Călugăru, it was unexplainable why Ralea and Suchianu thought the "literature of agony" was suited for the Romanians' "era of combat". He also suggested that Suchianu, alongside colleagues such as Petru Comarnescu and George Matei Cantacuzino, had no role to play in this new culture. Later that month, a committee was formed to purge the Legislative Council of its fascists, and Suchianu was included on its steering board. In September 1945, he contributed to the first-ever issue of Lumea, which was being put out by his former rival Călinescu. As a member of the editorial staff at the time, Ion Caraion recalls meetings in which both Suchianu and Călinescu had trouble making themselves heard over the "oral debit" of another doyen, Camil Petrescu. Suchianu endured as one of Lumea's main contributors, as the magazine took up support of the Communist Party, also writing for the generic-left-wing Contemporanul. In October, he lectured at the Jewish Democratic Committee on the topic of "Racism vs Democracy", being introduced there by Paul Iscovici.

By April 1946, Suchianu and Călinescu had joined the National Popular Party (PNP) and its "press and documentary section", participating in its conference tour. The PNP was affiliated with the Communist-ran Bloc of Democratic Parties (BPD), and, in June, Suchianu was assigned a seat on the BPD's own press and propaganda directorate. Also then, as a member of the Legislative Council, he joined the juridical section of the Romanian Society for Friendship with the Soviet Union. At the PNP's Națiunea, also put out by Călinescu, Suchianu drew attention with his criticism of the PNȚ, inaugurating his long polemics with Dreptatea, which included having his own connections with the far-right revealed for the public. Dreptatea's Bucur noted in June 1946 that Suchianu was a man of "moral frivolity" and "vulgar cynicism", who was being paid to write by the communist-and-PNP politico Petre Constantinescu-Iași. During August, Teodorescu-Braniște took up criticism of Suchianu's past in Jurnalul, calling him a Germanophile. Suchianu responded that the accusation was incoherent; Dreptatea, covering the exchange, mockingly agreed with Suchianu, who "does not have enough character to maintain any precise attitude", including in terms of Germanophilia. Later that year, Contemporanul hosted Suchianu's claim that the legislative election of November 1946, marking the PNȚ's final defeat, was the first one in Romania to have witnessed a free and transparent vote—in contrast to the historical consensus, which sees the election as rigged by the BPD.

As later argued by the disgraced communist Petre Pandrea, Suchianu's attacks on the PNȚ had been requested by two of the Communist Party's factional leaders, namely Ana Pauker and Vasile Luca. Pandrea regards Suchianu as one of "the boys who were minister material under all regimes", but who found themselves cast aside from late 1947, when a Romanian communist regime was fully established. Pătrășcanu, who was serving as Minister of Justice before his own fall from grace, once confirmed that he regarded Suchianu as a bribe-taker, who could not be trusted to either manage cinemas or lead newspapers; he noted having refused toi even consider Ralea's demands that Suchianu be made ambassador to Egypt. As Suchianu himself attested, in 1948 he granted ownership of Viața Romînească to the Communist Party, and withdrew from his editorial position. A period letter by Perpessicius notes that Suchianu had indeed renounced the brand around February 1948, but also that in May he was still a member of the editorial committee, alongside figures such as Călugăru, M. Constantinescu, Petrescu, Leonte Răutu, Alexandru Rosetti, and Cicerone Theodorescu (as well as Perpessicius himself). The Florica Suchianu film company was nationalized that November. For a while, D. I. Suchianu was active as a translator of Romanian poetry into French, including pieces by Tudor Arghezi and Mihai Eminescu; he is also noted for his rendition of Miorița. He viewed himself as the best contributor in the field, alongside Alexandru Al. Philippide, though he also noted that Mihail Sadoveanu had once mocked his Eminescu translations. His work also covered French-to-Romanian translations, as in his version of Edmond Haraucourt's Rondel de l'adieu.

Suchianu later noted that "in the years 1944–1956 I did not write"—Manuela Cernat suggested in 1987 that this was the result of an interdiction, a "supreme torture" for which he deserved "moral reparation". Despite having enjoyed protection from Ralea, who experienced advancement as an ally of the Communist Party, he was slated for political persecution, and was ultimately imprisoned by the Securitate. He was held without trial between 1948 and 1950, during which time it became widely rumored that the communists were using him as a means to pressure Ralea into full compliance. Pandrea reports that Suchianu served his time in Jilava Prison; as the prison cook, "he thoroughly made a fool of himself." In April 1951, the former inmate was helped along by Călinescu, who offered him employment at the Institute of Literary History and Folklore; he was formally recognized as an assistant researcher in August.

=== Cult status ===
Suchianu was ultimately assigned the cinema column in a new edition of Viața Romînească, beginning in early 1957—but his contributions there were panned by poet-journalist Mihu Dragomir, who noted that he was excessively confident of his abilities and scolding in his treatment of other cinema professionals. In June 1957, he was derided in Gazeta Literară for reporting on Galina Ulanova's "sweet piglet dimples" as shown in Romeo and Juliet. Also that month, Suchianu appeared at the Bucharest students' film society, newly established by Paul Barbă Neagră and Geo Saizescu, to give a lecture that drew comparisons between the art of Charlie Chaplin and that of René Clair. As noted by film historian Călin Căliman, who attended this and other lectures by Suchianu, the halls were always "packed full" with young men and women eager to hear him speak. His noted contributions for 1963 included an introduction to Hungarian cinema, which completed a topical lecture by Anna Halász. It declared Zoltán Várkonyi's Memories of a Strange Night to be highly notable for its "original and moving ending", and upheld Mihály Szemes' Alba Regia as an "original and perfect film". In August 1964, Luceafărul featured his panegyric to the recently deceased Ralea, quoting Horatio's farewell to Prince Hamlet.

In a 1977 interview, Saizescu described his support for the Suchianu method, which, as defined by him, consisted of "uncovering that modicum of art which supports the progress of cinema as a phenomenon and nurtures a director's creative act." According to Suchianu himself, his success with the reading public was in large part because he identified with moviegoers, telling them the "novellas that each spectator creates in his own mind"—what he called the povești-bis ("encore stories"). He also garnered praise from Țeposu and others as a deeply cultured man with a solid knowledge of psychology, political economy, natural science, literature and film. Employed at Gazeta Literară from 1965, three years later Suchianu was assigned to its successor, România Literară (also put out by the Writers' Union of Romania). He took unprecedented positions against the censorship apparatus, supporting projections of films such as Last Year at Marienbad and The Reenactment; his piece in defense of the latter took an unprecedented step in disputing verdicts published by Scînteia. By then, he was taking his lectures to provincial cities, including Bacău—according to a 1967 notice in Ateneu magazine, his visit there was insufficiently advertised, and therefore disappointing for Suchianu.

Suchianu revisited the era of silent film with the half-memoir Vedetele filmului de odinoară ("Stars of Bygone Films"), appearing at Editura Meridiane in mid-1968. It was criticized at the time of its publication by fellow writer Șerban Miroiu for its "unbridled enthusiasm", and for his full-on critique of modernist film. Vedetele showed Suchianu as fully committed to Hollywood films: he described Chaplin's Tramp as one of the major achievements in art, and John Barrymore as "perhaps the greatest actor that mankind ever had", while noting that Jeanne Moreau was overrated. He followed up with critical biographies of Marlene Dietrich and Erich von Stroheim, lauded by his fellow interwar cinephile, Ion Filotti Cantacuzino, for recognizing the centrality of actors in the cinematic experience.

In 1972, Meridiane also put out Suchianu and Constantin Popescu's volume on "unforgettable films" (Filme de neuitat), covering the ground between Lupu Pick's New Year's Eve and Sergiu Nicolaescu's Michael the Brave. Căliman praised the contribution overall, but questioned Suchianu and Popescu's categorization, which had The Grand Maneuver as a psychological film and Forest of the Hanged as a purely historical film. That year, Suchianu announced that he had prepared a second volume, as Arta a șaptea și al treilea om nou ("The Seventh Art and the Third New Man"), as well as a large number of entries for Editura Politică's dictionary of aesthetics; 40 of his Eminescu poems in French were handed for publication by Editura Eminescu, and additional 10 by Editura Albatros. His other contributions as a film theorist were collected in the volumes Cinematograful, acest necunoscut ("Cinema, the Unknown", 1973) and Nestemate cinematografice ("Cinematic Pearls", 1980). Another collection of his literary essays appeared in 1978, as Foste adevăruri viitoare ("Former Future Truths"). He also translated Michel Georges-Michel, Silvio Micheli, Alberto Moravia and Georges Sadoul into Romanian, as well as novels by Agatha Christie (Five Little Pigs), Natalia Ginzburg (Sagittarius), and Georges Michel (The Timid Adventures of a Window Washer).

=== Old age and death ===
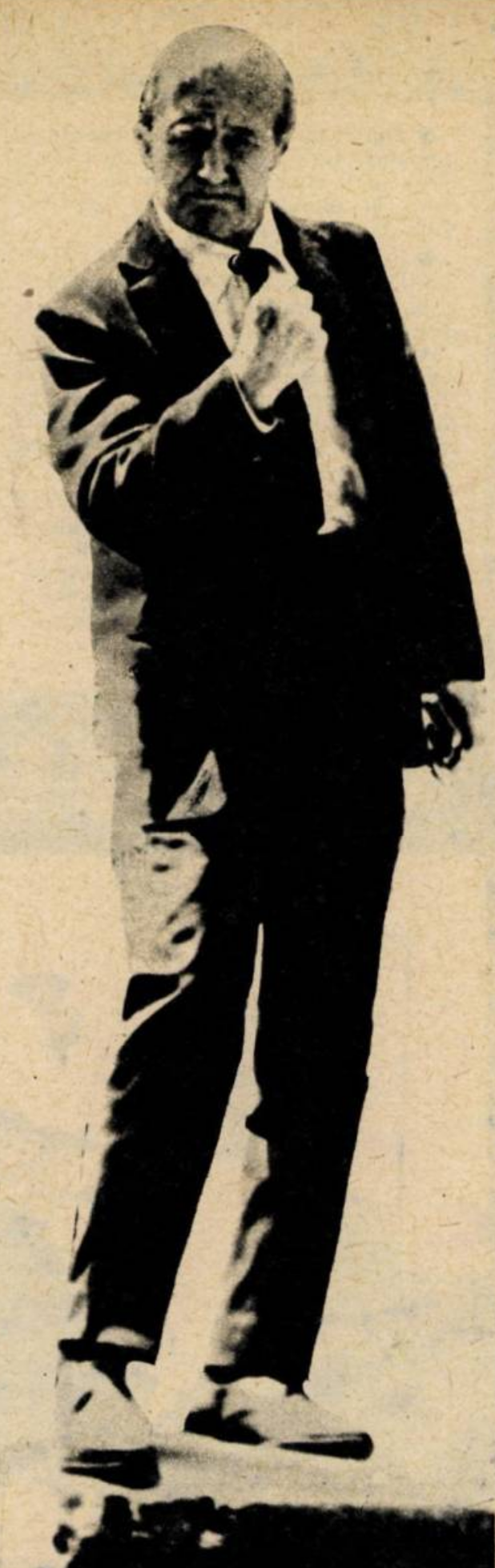
Suchianu in 1981

Suchianu spent his final decade as a film columnist for România Literară. He received the Romanian Filmmakers' Association Prize for Critics, and, in 1975, was granted a similar distinction from its Soviet counterpart. As argued in 1993 by his fellow columnist, Eugenia Vodă, Suchianu was "inimitable" as a raconteur, with film chronicles which fascinated and delighted his readers. Also according to Vodă, he enjoyed the protection of România Literară's chief editor, George Ivașcu, who never allowed the magazine to appear without Suchianu's column. In 1974, Suchianu was living on Gheorghiu-Dej (now Regina Elisabeta) Boulevard, "the Bucharest street that houses most cinemas". He had become one of the world's longest-serving film columnists, and Romania's oldest film critic by 1975.

Suchianu's eightieth birthday was highlighted with an editorial in Teatrul magazine, which called him the "creator of Romanian film critique and film theory". It also underscored his political trajectory from "the progressive and democratic cradle that was Viața Românească" to "antifascism and Marxism-Leninism". In his late seventies and eighties, Suchianu made public shows of his vitality and athleticism—playing tennis, skiing, or swimming, sometimes in front of Romanian Television cameras; fellow film critic Florian Potra suggests that none of these performances were staged, and that Suchianu, the "cheerful bonze", really had the constitution of a thirty-year-old. He was especially long-lived as a tennis player, and was also a certified ski instructor at the school in Predeal. He described sport as an accumulation of "tiny victories", which helped one's mind stay in focus.

The aging writer, described by Cernat as a "living relic" when it came to interwar literary life, was called upon to discuss his meetings with other figures—including in 1975, when he spoke at the Museum of Romanian Literature about his encounters with Sebastian. In early 1979, he was giving a "film museum" series of lectures at the Bucharest Students' Club, to an audience which reportedly comprised 800 people. One of these was Irina Margareta Nistor, who notes that he was wearing his Legion of Honor ribbon on his "impeccable suit". In a 1980 piece, partly written as a free verse poem, Radu Cosașu recounted that a parka-wearing Suchianu had been seen braving the blizzard, taking the trolleybus from his home to the Press Palace and never missing out on his lectures at the People's University. Also according to Cosașu, he was still charming youngsters by drawing comparisons between ABBA: The Movie and traditional stories of courtly love.

As noted by fellow columnist Mircea Alexandrescu, Suchianu was greatly affected by the successive deaths of his daughter, Teți, his niece, Catinca Ralea, and his nephew-in-law, Emanoil Petruț; he therefore lost his cheerful demeanor and apparently gave up sports, spending his final period writing only in his bed. He died in Bucharest on the night of 17/18 April 1985, leaving a "massive" autobiography, Amintiri din șapte vremi ("Recollections of Seven Eras"), which had preoccupied him since 1972.

== Legacy ==
Amintiri was still unpublished at the time of Suchianu's death, and was probably mishandled by his would-be editors. Beginning in 1983, Suchianu had been regularly visited by film critic Grid Modorcea, who was running a project of oral history, including records of "our country's literary climate before and after August 23, 1944", on behalf of Editura Minerva. Their interviews were published as a Minerva book in 1986. Literary critic Ovid S. Crohmălniceanu praised the "thousands of brilliant things" imparted in the book, noting that Suchianu had endured, to his end, as a modern critic of experimental film; Suchianu stated that he preferred Les Infidèles over Hiroshima mon amour, and confessed his appreciation for Douglas Fairbanks in The Black Pirate.

According to Cernat, the book was "charming" but rambling, with "pointless" episodes in which Modorcea allowed Suchianu to recount the plot "of this and that American melodrama". The biographical portion of the conversation also featured a "shattering retelling of Mihail Sebastian's tragic end", with an "ambiguous" statement which, according to literary historian Mihai Iovănel, appeared to credit a conspiracy theory about his death as having been arranged by the communists. The book was officially launched at Studio Cinema of Bucharest in February 1987, with a companion exhibit of items from Suchianu's personal collection. The event was attended by Modorcea, Popescu, and Crohmălniceanu, alongside Andrei Blaier, Tudor Caranfil, Ion Cristoiu, and Romulus Vulpescu. Modorcea could publish the uncensored versions of his Suchianu interviews in 1997, some seven years after the anti-communist revolution.
