= Ștefan Bârsănescu =

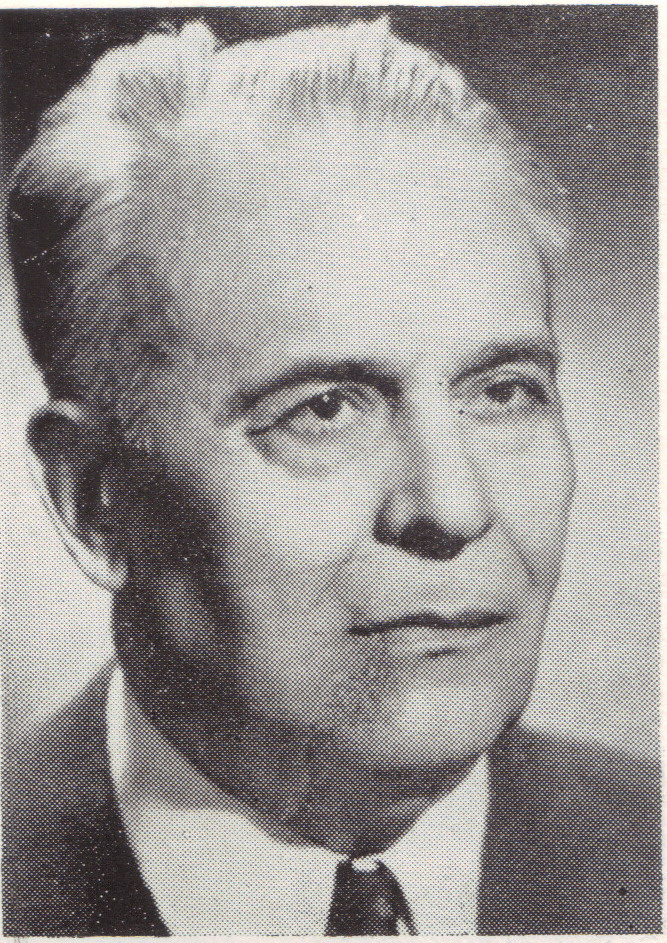
Ștefan Bârsănescu

Ștefan Bârsănescu (28 March 1895 – 5 November 1984) was a Romanian academician and educator who gained renown as an essayist and philosopher.

Born in the village of Viperești in Buzău County, a part of the historical region of Muntenia, Ștefan Bârsănescu was a member of the Romanian Academy and the author of over thirty scholarly volumes and more than five hundred articles and essays. He died in Iași four-and-a-half months before his 90th birthday.

== Selected bibliography ==
- Pedagogia pentru școlile normale - (1932)
- Didactica - (1935)
- Unitatea pedagogiei contemporane ca știință - (1936)
- Tehnologia didactică - (1939)
- Pedagogia practică - (1946)
- Pedagogia agricolă - (1946)
- Istoria pedagogiei românești - (1951)
- Schola latina de la Cotnari - (1957)
- Academia domnească din Iași, 1714-1921 - (1962)
- Pagini nescrise din istoria culturii românești - (1971)
- Educația, învățământul și gândirea pedagogică din România - dicționar cronologic - (1978, in collaboration with Florela Bârsănescu)
- Medalioane pentru pedagogia modelelor - (1983)
