= Viperești =

- Commune
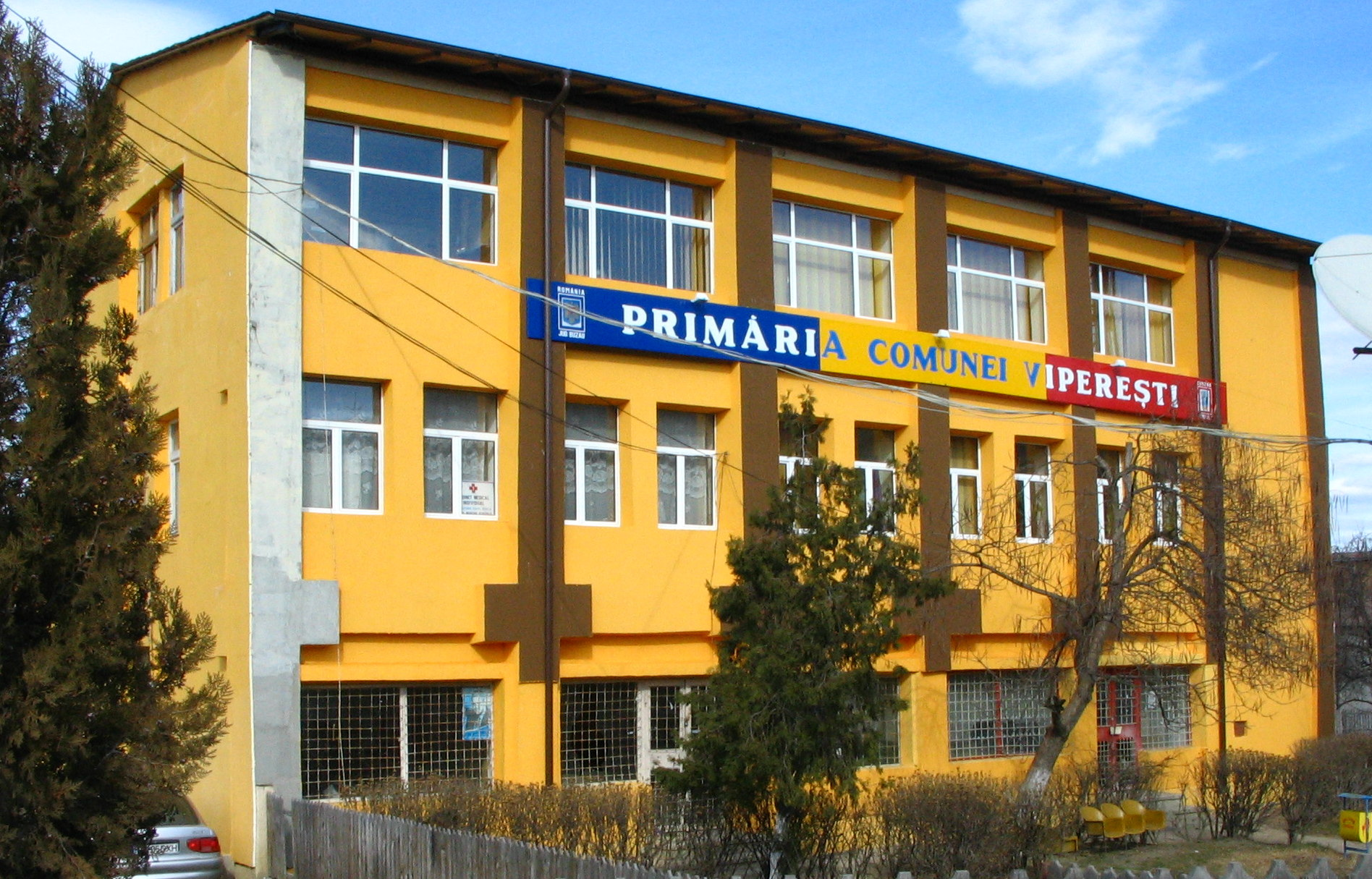
- Viperești town hall

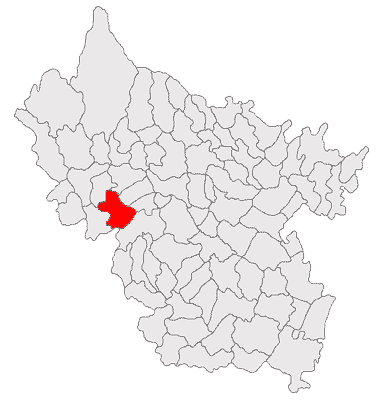
- Location in Buzău County

- Location in Romania
- Coordinates: 45°14′N 26°28′E
- Country: Romania
- County: Buzău
- Subdivisions: Muscel, Pălici, Rușavăț, Tronari, Ursoaia, Viperești

Government
  - Mayor (2020–2024): Romi Dedu (PSD)
- Area: 66.06 km^{2} (25.51 sq mi)
- Elevation: 233 m (764 ft)
- Population (2021-12-01): 3,242
  - Density: 49.08/km^{2} (127.1/sq mi)
- Time zone: UTC+02:00 (EET)
  - Summer (DST): UTC+03:00 (EEST)
- Postal code: 127705
- Area code: +(40) 238
- Vehicle reg.: BZ
- Website: www.comunaviperesti.ro

Viperești is a commune in Buzău County, Muntenia, Romania. It is composed of six villages: Muscel, Pălici, Rușavăț, Tronari, Ursoaia, and Viperești.

Historical population
Year	Pop.	±%
2002	3,640	—
2011	3,493	−4.0%
2021	3,242	−7.2%
Source: Census data

== Natives ==
- Ștefan Bârsănescu (1895 – 1984), essayist and philosopher
- Ion Caraion (1923 – 1986), poet, essayist, and translator
