= Michel Georges-Michel =

French painter, journalist, writer and translator (1883-1985)

Michel Georges-Michel (3 November 1883 – 31 March 1985), was a French painter, journalist, novelist, and translator of English and American authors. He was born in Paris.

== Biography ==
Georges-Michel studied at Beaux Arts, a student of Othon Friesz and Dufy, and at l'École du Louvre. An artistic councillor, he worked with the Ballets Russes of Sergei Diaghilev from 1913 to 1929. In 1917 he organised the first exhibition of Picasso in Rome. Founder of the prix de Rome for poetry, he worked on exhibitions of Matisse and Soutine at the Venice Biennale. He was also the initiator of the first cinema festivals and was president of the Association of dance writers and critics as well as the vice-president of the French Artistic Press Union.

He should not be confused with his near-namesake, the painter Georges Michel (1763–1843), known as Michel de Montparnasse.

== Works ==
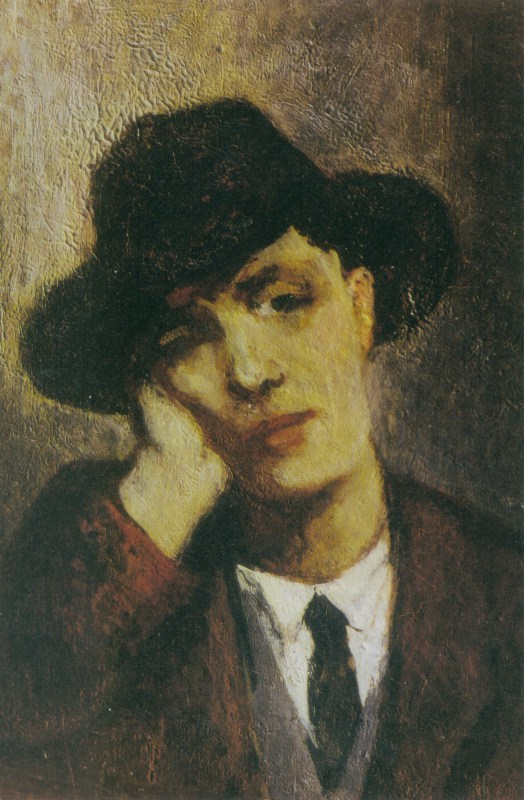
Modigliani, Modrulleau in Les Montparnos, painted by Jeanne Hébuterne

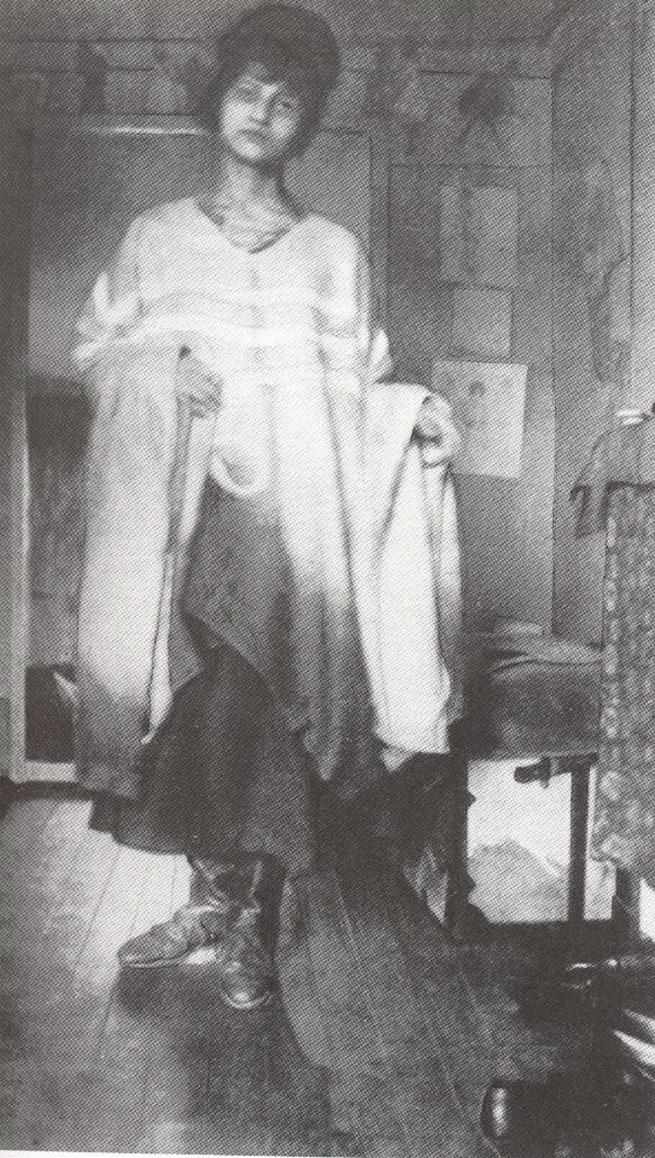
Jeanne Hébuterne, Haricot-Rouge in Les Montparnos

Georges-Michel wrote more than one hundred books, diaries, critiques, souvenirs and novels. Some of his works have been adapted for cinema and television. Many of his works are displayed in museums, notably in the Museum of Modern Art in Paris and the Museum of San Francisco.

One of his most famous works, Les Montparnos, known as the first Georges-Michel, was written in 1923, published in 1929 and reprinted for the mass market (by Le Livre de Poche in 1976). Set in Montparnasse, it was based on the life of Modigliani (Modrulleau in the novel) and his mistress Jeanne Hébuterne (whose nickname "Noix-de-Coco" inspired the character of "Haricot-Rouge" in the novel)

== Other works by Georges-Michel ==
- La Rose de Perse, French illustrated edition, 1920
- L'Époque tango, Tome I, Pall-malls, Deauville, Paris, Riviéra, L'édition, 1920
- La Vie à Deauville, cover by van Dongen, Flammarion, 1922
- Dans la fête à Venice, cover by Van Dongen, Fayard, 1922
- La Bohême canaille, Re-edition, 1922
- Les Montparnos, novel, cover by Picasso, Fayard, 1924; Le Livre de Poche, 1976 [film, Les amants de Montparnasse, 1958, directed by Jacques Becker, starring Gérard Philippe as Modigliani, Anouk Aimée as Jeanne Hébuterne, Lino Ventura...]
- La Vie mondaine sur la Riviéra et en Italie, Nice, Cannes, Monte Carlo, Rome, Florence, Venise, cover by Van Dongen, Flammarion, 1925
- En jardinant avec Bergson, chroniques 1899-1926, Albin Michel, 1926
- Deauville, 1928; Le livre d'histoire-Lorisse, 2002
- Les Journées de Biarritz, éditions Baudinière, 1931
- Folles de luxe et dames de qualité, cover by Van Dongen, éditions Baudinière, 1931
- Nuits d'actrices, Les éditions de France, 1933
- Peau douce, novel, éditions Baudinière, 1933
- La Bohème de minuit, Fayard, 1933
- Ardente, novel, Tallandier, 1934
- Coeur-chaud ou le chercheur d'amour, éditions Baudinière, 1934
- Mon image devant toi, cover by Van Dongen, éditions Baudinière, 1935
- Autres Montparnos, Albin Michel, 1935
- Star, novel, éditions Baudinière, 1939
- Nulle part dans le monde, tome 1. Le dernier bateau, tome 2. Il est grand d'être à Miami, La Maison française, 1941
- Peintres et sculpteurs que j'ai connus, 1900-1942, Brentano's, 1942
- Chefs d'œuvres de peintres contemporains, Maison française, 1945
- Le Baiser à Consuelo, suivi de Récits d'Espagne, Bordas, 1947
- De Renoir à Picasso, Les peintres que j'ai connus, Fayard, 1954

== See also ==
- School of Paris
