= Le Moment =

French language newspaper in Bucharest (1935–1940)

Le Moment was a French language daily newspaper published from Bucharest. The newspaper was founded in the early 1930s (between 1933 and 1935 depending on the source) by Alfred Hefter, and according to Emery Reves it was in serious difficulties and about to go under in May 1939. The paper ceased publication in 1940.
